= Dave Burrell =

American jazz pianist

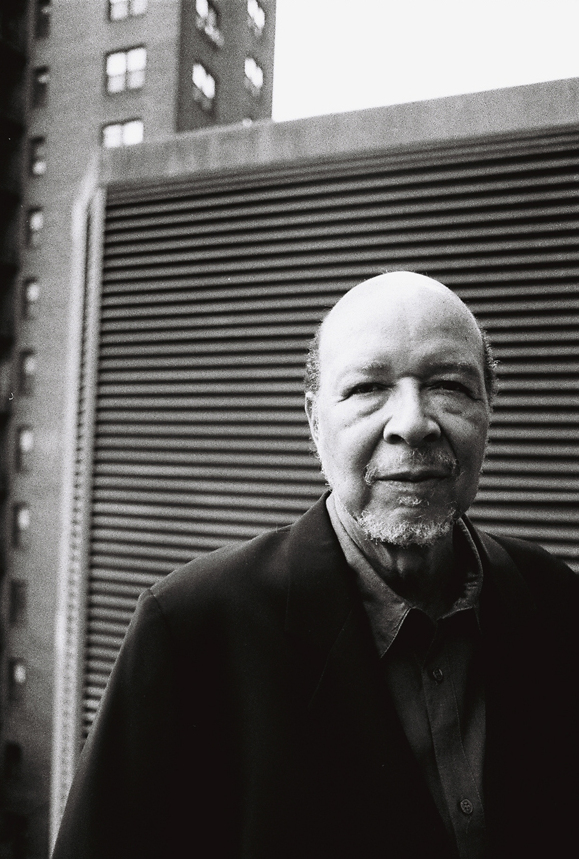
- Burrell in 2007

Background information
- Born: Herman Davis Burrell; September 10, 1940 (age 85); Middletown, Ohio, U.S.
- Genres: Jazz
- Instrument: Piano
- Years active: 1970s–present
- Website: daveburrell.com

Herman Davis "Dave" Burrell (born September 10, 1940) is an American jazz pianist. He has played with many jazz musicians including Archie Shepp, Pharoah Sanders, Marion Brown and David Murray.

== Biography ==
Born in Middletown, Ohio, United States, Burrell grew fond of jazz at a young age after meeting Herb Jeffries. Burrell studied music at the University of Hawaii from 1958 to 1960, then, beginning in 1961, attended the Berklee College of Music in Boston, graduating with degrees in composition/arranging and performance in 1965. While in Boston, he played with Tony Williams and Sam Rivers.

In 1965, Burrell moved to New York City, where he worked and recorded with Grachan Moncur III, Marion Brown, and Pharoah Sanders. He also started the Untraditional Jazz Improvisational Team with saxophonist Byard Lancaster, bassist Sirone, and drummer Bobby Kapp. In 1968, Burrell co-founded The 360 Degree Music Experience with Grachan Moncur III and Beaver Harris and recorded two albums with the group. The following year, Burrell began an association with Archie Shepp, with whom he would play the 1969 Pan-African Festival in Algiers, and with whom he would go on to record nearly twenty albums.

Burrell's first album as a leader was High Won-High Two (1968), produced by Alan Douglas. Echo and La Vie de Bohème were recorded for BYG Actuel in Paris in 1969. He recorded Round Midnight for Nippon Columbia.

In 1978 he composed a jazz opera entitled Windward Passages, in collaboration with Swedish poet and lyricist Monika Larsson, with an album of the same name, based on the opera, released in 1979 on Hathut in Switzerland. Their touring and recording collaborations resulted in Daybreak (1989), Brother to Brother (1992), In Concert (1992), and Windward Passages (1993). Burrell appears on Murray's DIW albums Lovers, Deep River, Ballads, Spirituals, Tenors, Remembrances, and Picasso, recorded between 1988 and 1993.

Burrell tours and performs as a soloist and as a leader of a duo, trio, and larger ensembles. He recorded for the High Two label from Philadelphia. His 2004 album Expansion (with bassist William Parker and drummer Andrew Cyrille) was acclaimed by NPR, Down Beat, Village Voice, JazzTimes, The Wire, and others. Splasc Records (Italy) released a studio solo piano recording, Margy Pargy in 2005. In 2006, Burrell released Consequences, a live duet set with Medeski, Martin & Wood drummer Billy Martin, and Momentum, featuring bassist Michael Formanek and drummer Guillermo E. Brown. RAI Trade (Italy) recorded a concert of Burrell and Larsson's collaborations, Dave Burrell Plays His Songs, featuring singer Leena Conquest, which was released in 2010.

In 2022, it was announced that Burrell had donated his archive to the Center for American Music in the University of Pittsburgh Library System.

== Discography ==
=== As leader ===
Year recorded	Title	Label	Personnel/Notes
1965?	High	Douglas	With Norris Sirone Jones (bass), Bobby Kapp and Sunny Murray (drums), Pharoah Sanders (tambourine)
1968	High Won-High Two	Black Lion	With Norris Sirone Jones (bass), Bobby Kapp and Sunny Murray (drums), Pharoah Sanders (tambourine)
1969?	La Vie de Bohème	BYG Actuel	With Eleanor Burrell (vocals), Ric Colbeck (piano, trumpet, harp), Claude Delcloo (chimes, drums, tympani), Beb Guérin (bass), Grachan Moncur III (trombone, chimes), Kenneth Terroade (flute, tenor sax)
1969	Echo	BYG Actuel	With Arthur Jones (alto sax), Grachan Moncur III (trombone), Sunny Murray (bass, drums), Archie Shepp (tenor sax), Alan Silva (bass), Clifford Thornton (cornet)
1970	After Love	America	With Bertrand Gauthier (drums), Michel Gladieux (double bass), Ron Miller (mandolin, double bass), Roscoe Mitchell (reeds), Don Moye (drums), Alan Silva (violin, cello, electric cello)
1973	Dreams	Trio Records	With Motoharu Yoshizawa (bass)
1973	Only Me	Trio Records	Solo piano
1976	Wildflowers 3: The New York Loft Jazz Sessions (reissued on Wildflowers: The New York Loft Jazz Sessions - Complete): one track	Douglas / Casablanca	With Stafford James (bass) and Harold White (drums)
1977?	Black Spring	Marge	Solo piano
1977	Teardrops for Jimmy	Denon Jazz	Solo piano
1978?	Dave Burrell Plays Ellington & Monk	Denon	With Takashi Mizuhashi (bass)
1978?	Lush Life	Denon	With Takashi Mizuhashi (bass)
1979	Windward Passages	Hathut	Solo piano; in concert
1979?	Round Midnight	Nippon Columbia	With Takashi Mizuhashi (bass)
1981	Live at the Black Musicians' Conference, 1981	NoBusiness	With Marion Brown (alto sax)
1989	Daybreak	Gazell	With David Murray (bass clarinet, tenor sax)
1990	The Jelly Roll Joys	Gazell	Solo piano
1991	In Concert	Victo	Duo, with David Murray (tenor sax); in concert
1993	Windward Passages (Black Saint)	Black Saint	With David Murray (bass clarinet, tenor sax); Monika Larsson (vocals) added on one track
1993	Brother to Brother	Gazell	With David Murray (bass clarinet, tenor sax)
2000	Recital	CIMP	With Tyrone Brown (bass)
2001	Live at Caramoor	Sonoris	Solo piano; in concert
2003	Expansion	High Two Records	With William Parker (bass), Andrew Cyrille (drums)
2003	Conception	Somerealmusic	With David Tamura (tenor saxophone) and Joe Chonto (drums)
2005?	Margy Pargy	Splasc(H)	Solo piano
2005	Consequences	Amulet	Duo, with Billy Martin (percussion); in concert
2005	Momentum	High Two	Trio, with Michael Formanek (bass), Guillermo E. Brown (drums)
2008?	Esquisse for a Walk	NTCD	with Daniel Huck
2010?	Plays His Songs	RAI Trade	with Leena Conquest (vocals)
2013?	Darlingtonia	Jazzwerkstatt	with Silke Eberhard
2014?	Turning Point	NoBusiness	with Steve Swell
2018	1.11.18	Otoroku	Solo piano

=== As sideman or co-leader ===
With Albert Ayler

- Holy Ghost: Rare & Unissued Recordings (1962–70) (Revenant, 2004): one track

With Marion Brown

- Three for Shepp (Impulse!, 1966)
- Juba-Lee (Fontana, 1967)
- 79118 Live (DIW, 1979)
- Live at the Black Musicians' Conference, 1981 (NoBusiness Records, 2018)
- Capricorn Moon to Juba Lee Revisited (ezz-thetics, 2019)

With Stanley Cowell

- Questions / Answers (Trio Records, 1974)

With Henry Grimes, Roberto Pettinato, and Tyshawn Sorey

- Purity (Sony, 2012)
- Same Egg (Sony, 2013)

With Duo Baars-Henneman

- Trandans (Wig, 2017)

With Noah Howard

- At Judson Hall (ESP-Disk, 1968)

With Khan Jamal

- Speak Easy (Gazell, 1989)

With Stafford James

- Jazz a Confronto 26 (Horo Records, 1976)

With Giuseppi Logan

- The Giuseppi Logan Quintet (Tompkins Square, 2010)

With Grachan Moncur III

- New Africa (BYG Actuel, 1969)
- Shadows (Denon, 1977)

With David Murray

- Hope Scope (Black Saint, 1987)
- Ballads (DIW, 1988)
- Deep River (DIW, 1988)
- Spirituals (DIW, 1988)
- Lovers (DIW, 1988)
- Tenors (DIW, 1988)
- Lucky Four (Tutu, 1989)
- Last of the Hipmen (Jazzline, 1989)
- Remembrances (DIW, 1990)
- Death of a Sideman (DIW, 1991)
- In Concert (Victo, 1991)
- Picasso (DIW, 1992)

With Sunny Murray

- Homage to Africa (BYG Actuel, 1969)
- Sunshine (BYG Actuel, 1969)
- Charred Earth (Kharma, 1977)
- Perles noires Vol. I (Eremite Records, 2005)

With Alessandro Nobile and Antonio Moncada

- Reaction And Reflection (Rudi Records, 2018)

With William Parker

- The Inside Songs of Curtis Mayfield (Rai Trade, 2007)
- I Plan to Stay a Believer (AUM Fidelity, 2010)
- Essence of Ellington (Centering, 2012)

With Odeon Pope

- Epitome (Soul Note, 1993)
- Changes & Changes (CIMP, 1999)

With Roswell Rudd

- Inside Job (Arista/Freedom, 1976)

With Pharoah Sanders

- Tauhid (Impulse!, 1967)

With Archie Shepp

- The Way Ahead (Impulse!, 1968)
- Blasé (BYG Actuel, 1969)
- Black Gipsy (America, 1969)
- Pitchin Can (America, 1969)
- Live at the Pan-African Festival (BYG Actuel, 1969)
- Yasmina, a Black Woman (BYG Actuel, 1969)
- For Losers (Impulse!, 1971)
- Things Have Got to Change (Impulse!, 1971)
- The Cry of My People (Impulse!, 1972)
- Attica Blues (Impulse!, 1972)
- Kwanza (Impulse!, 1974)
- There's a Trumpet in My Soul (Arista Freedom 1975)
- Montreux One (Arista Freedom, 1975)
- Montreux Two (Arista Freedom, 1975)
- A Sea of Faces (Black Saint, 1975)
- Body and Soul (Horo, 1975)
- U-Jaama (Unite) (Unitelidis, 1975)
- Jazz a Confronto 27 (Horo, 1976)
- Lover Man (Timeless, 1989)

With Sonny Sharrock

- Black Woman (Vortex, 1969)

With Alan Silva

- Luna Surface (BYG Actuel, 1969)
- Skillfullness (ESP-Disk, 1969)
- Seasons (BYG Actuel, 1971)

With Bob Stewart

- Then & Now (Postcards, 1996)
- The Crave (NoBusiness Records, 2016)

With Steve Swell

- Soul Travelers (RogueArt, 2016)

With Clifford Thornton

- Ketchaoua (BYG Actuel, 1967)

With Le Tigre des platanes

- Disappearing (Mr Morezon, 2013)

With Patty Waters

- College Tour (ESP-Disk, 1966)
- The Complete ESP-Disk Recordings (ESP-Disk, 2006)

With Bobby Zankel

- Celebrating William Parker @ 65 (Not Two, 2017)

With The 360 Degree Music Experience

- From Ragtime to No Time (360 Records, 1975)
- In: Sanity (Black Saint, 1976)
