= Vice Squad Dick =

EP by Foetus / Chrome Cranks
- Released: 1994
- Recorded: Self Immolation Studios, Brooklyn, NY; Funhouse Studios, NYC
- Genre: Noise rock, industrial
- Length: 21:59
- Label: PCP Entertainment
- Producer: Chrome Cranks, J. G. Thirlwell

J. G. Thirlwell chronology
Gondwanaland (1992)	Vice Squad Dick (1994)	Gash (1995)

Vice Squad Dick is a collaborative EP by Foetus and Chrome Cranks, released in 1994 by PCP Entertainment. The title track depicts a cartoonish distillation of the life of a detective and is a cover of a track that was allegedly recorded in 1979 by Dick Uranus.

== Track listing ==
No.	Title	Writer(s)	Artist	Length
1.	"Vice Squad Dick"	Uranus, Cloner, Chlorax, Alligator, Boulevard	Foetus	4:27
2.	"Little Johnny Jewel" (Television cover)	Tom Verlaine	Chrome Cranks	7:04
3.	"Outside of Time" (Von Lmo cover)	Von Lmo	Foetus	3:50
4.	"Vice Squad Dick"	Uranus, Cloner, Chlorax, Alligator, Boulevard	Chrome Cranks	6:38

== Personnel ==
Adapted from the Vice Squad Dick liner notes.

- Chrome Cranks – vocals, instruments, production and engineering (2, 4)
- J. G. Thirlwell (as Foetus) – vocals, instruments, production and engineering (1, 3)

== Release history ==
Region	Date	Label	Format	Catalog
United States	1994	PCP	CD, LP	PCP-011
