= Brother to Brother =

Brother to Brother may refer to:

- Brother to Brother (film), a 2004 film written and directed by Rodney Evans
- Brother to Brother (Dave Burrell and David Murray album), 1993
- Brother to Brother (Gino Vannelli album)
- Brother to Brother, Tinga Stewart album
- Brother to Brother: New Writings by Black Gay Men, 1991 book edited by Essex Hemphill
