= Bobby Kapp =

American jazz drummer (born 1942)

- Born: April 11, 1942 (age 82)
- Origin: Perth Amboy, New Jersey
- Genres: Jazz, free jazz
- Occupation: Musician
- Instrument: Drums
- Website: Official Website

Bobby Kapp (born Robert Kaplan on April 11, 1942) is an American jazz drummer.

== Life and career ==
He studied with Alan Dawson at Berklee College of Music before moving to New York in the 60s, where he played and recorded with alto saxophonists Marion Brown and Noah Howard, pianist Dave Burrell and tenor saxophonist Gato Barbieri. After relocating in San Miguel de Allende, Mexico, in the 90s he co-led the Fine Wine Trio with pianist Richard Wyands and bassist Gene Perla and reunited with Noah Howard for the duo album Between Two Eternities. In 2014 he released the quartet album Themes 4 Transmutation, followed by Cactus, a duo recording with pianist Matthew Shipp.

== Discography ==
=== As leader/co-leader ===
- Themes 4 Transmutation (2014)
- Cactus (Northern Spy, 2016) with Matthew Shipp

=== As sideman ===
with Gato Barbieri

- In Search of the Mystery (ESP-Disk, 1967)

with Marion Brown

- Three for Shepp (Impulse!, 1967)

with Dave Burrell

- High (Douglas, 1968)
- High Won-High Two (Freedom, 1968)

with Noah Howard

- At Judson Hall (ESP-Disk, 1968)
- Between Two Eternities (Cadence Jazz, 2000)

with Ivo Perelman

- The Art Of Perelman-Shipp Volume 2: Tarvos (Leo, 2017)
