= Iohan Quirijn van Regteren Altena =

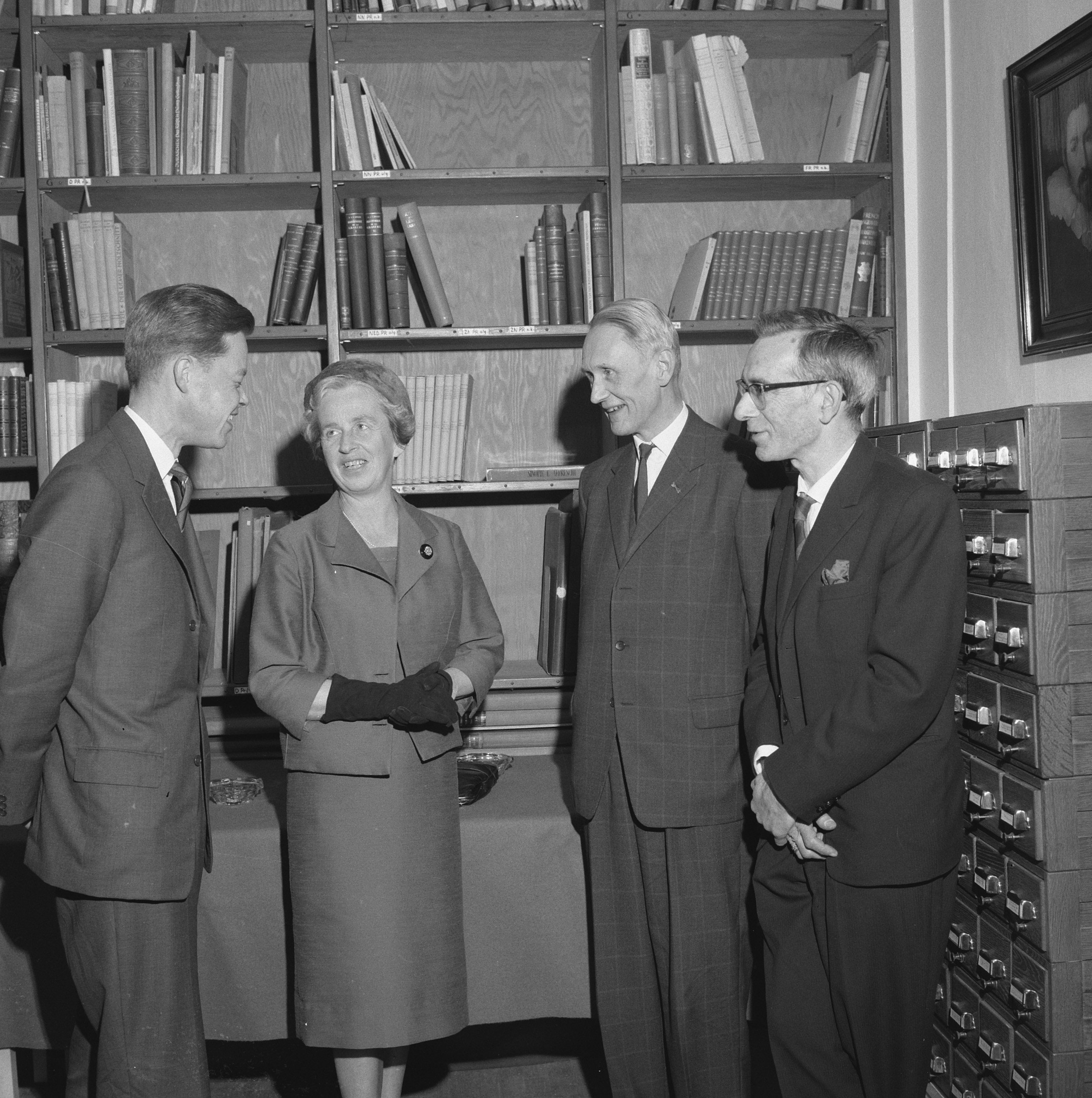
Opening of the new home of the Art Historical Institute, showing (from left to right) Prof. Dr. Josua Bruyn, Mrs Schokking-Röell, Prof. Dr. Van Regteren Altena and Prof. Dr. J.C. Kamerbeek (1962)

Iohan Quirijn van Regteren Altena or Johan Quirijn van Regteren Altena (16 May 1899 - 18 October 1980) was a Dutch art historian and art collector.

== Life ==
Born in Amsterdam, he was a son of Lucas van Regteren Altena (1865–1934) and his wife Charlotte Octavia Loman (1873–1963) - he had a number of sisters. After his studies at the Academy of Fine Arts he spent two years painting in Italy. He met the art historian Raimond van Marle (1888–1936) in Perugia and Godefridus Johannes Hoogewerff (1884–1963) in Rome, which convinced him to switch to art history. Back in the Netherlands, during the 1920s he assisted Frits Lugt who had been commissioned to compile a full catalogue of Flemish and Dutch paintings in the Louvre.

He then enrolled at the University of Utrecht, where he studied under Willem Vogelsang and in 1935 gained his doctorate with a dissertation on the drawings of Jacob de Gheyn II. From 1932 to 1937 Van Regteren Altena was curator of the Fodor Collection and on 21 July 1937 was made Professor of Medieval and Modern Art History, followed by ordinary Professor on 25 May 1962, both at the University of Amsterdam. He held this position until becoming an Emeritus Professor on 1 September 1969.

He and Abraham Bredius both agreed that Christ at Emmaus was by Jan Vermeer. Another painting, Christ Washing the Disciples' Feet, also counted among Vermeer's works and was rediscovered during the Second World War - he believed it to be a fake made between 1942 and 1943. Ultimately both works were identified as fakes by Han van Meegeren. From 1948 to 1962 he was director of the department of prints and drawings at the Rijksmuseum and organised and increased the collections. His acquisitions included drawings by Rembrandt van Rijn and Peter Paul Rubens and by Dutch and Flemish masters. He also began to build up a collection of Italian and French drawings. From 1952 to 1973, as curator of the Teyler Foundation in Haarlem, he produced two catalogues of its drawings, that were exhibited in 1970 at the Victoria and Albert Museum in London and in 1972 at the Louvre. In 1967 and 1968 he was invited to Harvard University as a guest professor.

Van Regteren Altena also collected art and drawings himself. He also edited the magazine Oud Holland and regularly published his findings on the origins and development of Rembrandt's work. In his last two years he again devoted himself to the work of Jakob de Gheyn II, supported by the Dutch Organisation for the Promotion of Basic Research, and completed his masterwork Jacques de Gheyn. Three Generations - however he died before it was completed and it was published in three volumes in 1983.

== Family ==
On 7 September 1929 Van Regteren Altena married Augusta Louisa Wilhelmina (née van Roijen [Royen], 29 September 1906 - 9 October 2006) Their children included the composer Maarten Altena.

His father's siblings included:

- Martinus van Regteren Altena (19 September 1866 – 10 October 1908).
- Marie van Regteren Altena (28 December 1868 – 6 July 1958).
- Johanna Quirina van Regteren Altena (11 June 1876 – 17 March 1954)

== Selected works ==
- (in German) with Cornelius Müller: Der Maler Jacob Van Geel. In: Jahrbuch der Preußischen Kunstsammlungen. 52, Nr. 3, 1931, p. 182–200.
- (in Dutch) Jacques de Gheyn. Swets & Zeitlinger, Amsterdam 1935.
- (in German) Holländische Meisterzeichnungen des 17. Jahrhunderts. Holbein-Verlag, Basel 1948.
- (in Dutch) In memoriam Mr. N. Beets. 1878–1963. In: Oud Holland. Jahrgang 78, Nr. 3/4, 1963, S. 84–86, JSTOR 42710702.
- with P. W. Ward-Jackson Drawings from the Teyler Museum, Haarlem. Eyre and Spottiswoode, London 1970.
- (in French) Cent dessins du Musée Teyler, Haarlem. Editions des Musées Nationaux, Paris 1972.
- Jacques de Gheyn. Three generations. 3 Bände, Nijhoff, Den Haag 1983.

== Bibliography ==
- Miscellanea I.Q. van Regteren Altena 16.5.1969. Scheltema & Holkema, Amsterdam 1969 (Festschrift zum 70. Geburtstag).
- "In memoriam prof. I. Q. van Regteren Altena. In: Oud Holland. Band 95, Nr. 1, 1981, ISSN 0030-672X". JSTOR 42711324.
- K. G. Boon: I.Q. van Regteren Altena (1899–1980). In: The Burlington Magazine. 123, 1981, S. 359–360.
- Robert W. Scheller: Altena, J(ohan) Q(uirijn) van Regteren. In: Grove Dictionary of Art. Macmillan, New York / London 1996, ISBN 1-884446-00-0 doi:10.1093/gao/9781884446054.article.T002114 (Stand 2003, Teilansicht Vollzugriff nur mit Login).

== External links (in Dutch) ==
- I.Q. van Regteren Altena dbnl.org
- Eintrag in der Datenbank Les Marques de Collections de Dessins & d’Estampes
- Regteren Altena, I. Q., van im Dictionary of Art Historians
