= Why Not? (Marion Brown album) =

Studio album by Marion Brown
- Released: 1968
- Recorded: October 23, 1966
- Label: ESP-Disk

Marion Brown chronology
Porto Novo (1967)	Why Not? (1968)	Gesprächsfetzen (1968)

Why Not? is an album by American saxophonist Marion Brown. It was recorded in October 1966 in New York City, and was released in 1968 on the ESP-Disk label. The album, which was also released with the title Why Not, features Brown on alto saxophone, Stanley Cowell on piano, Sirone (Norris Jones) on bass, and Rashied Ali on drums. The album was recorded roughly a month prior to Brown's album Juba-Lee. The tracks were reissued on the 2020 ezz-thetics (Hat Hut) album Why Not? Porto Novo! Revisited.

== Reception ==
Professional ratings
Review scores
Source	Rating
AllMusic	3.5/5 stars
All About Jazz	5/5 stars
The Penguin Guide to Jazz	4/4 stars

In a review for AllMusic, Thom Jurek wrote: "Brown reveals his great strengths as a composer and bandleader, which are matched by his abilities as a soloist.. This is a phenomenal album, a place where Marion Brown got to reveal early on why he was such a formidable force: He understood the inherent importance of musical traditions and he also understood how imperative it was to them and to jazz to extend them in a manner that left their roots clearly visible."

Writing for All About Jazz, Raul D'Gama Rose commented: "It is a joy to hear the bright and clear sound of Brown's alto all over again. Clearly his understanding of the altissimo voice and its vibrant tone is unprecedented. He traverses its range often and with wide latitude, giving himself plenty of air. As a result of this he may play fewer notes, but these are so often chosen to highlight the resonant brightness of each character. Brown also plays with a deeply spiritual sense of music. This may not be as obvious as it was in the case of Coltrane, whose song titles spoke to the spiritual side of things, but when Brown chose notes to play they are often heraldic and echo with praise of human condition... This is what makes Why Not? not simply a harking back to the path breaking music of the '60s, but also a deeply sensitive recording with an enduring quality all its own... The release of this record is sure to find newer legions of listeners for Marion Brown."

In a separate essay for All About Jazz, Clifford Allen remarked: "The most immediately striking thing about Why Not? is its utter and complete dedication to both wistful, romantic lyricism and the edgy, insistent 'cry.' There are few recordings in this music which balance hunger and fullness so well." Allen also explained the origins of the cover photo, which was taken in Paris: "At the corner of the Rue Washington, near the Arc de Triomphe, there was a huge publicity poster depicting the red and blue Bonnet Phrygien, the headwear of participants in the French Revolution. The poster had a 'Revolutionnaire' sign and was a teaser for a publicity campaign for an undisclosed product. Berger thought it might be worth a try to have photos taken of Marion in front of the colorful poster with a revolutionary attitude over what looked like a mini barricade."

The authors of the Penguin Guide to Jazz Recordings wrote: "Cowell is in extraordinary form and steals the show with a brilliant opening solo on 'La Sorella'. He is equally good, but subtler, on 'Fortunata', which also features Brown's most poignant solo of the set. It is hard to judge what he builds it on, because the great beauty of this record is that it seems to create an impressive edifice with the scantiest of materials. Ali is as powerful as ever... Strongly recommended."

Writing for Point of Departure, David Grundy commented: "'La Sorrella' sets the tone for the album. Brown's expansive melodic statements float and soar over Stanley Cowell's lushly swelling chords, but he's equally capable of turning acidic, turning his characteristic switch to an altissimo upper register with an alacrity that is shocking and wholly of a piece with the formal contours of his improvisations... 'Fortunato'... feels like an extended sigh: a song of love and regret. The title piece has a jittery, complex melody, rendered in stark unison by Brown and Cowell. Rashied Ali lights a veritable fire here, leading into and out of his own roiling solo. In his unpublished mid-1970s thesis for a MA from Wesleyan University, Brown notes that the concluding piece, 'Homecoming,' formed, with 'Juba Lee,' part of 'an improvisational suite based on pieces that were characteristic of early Afro-American music. It begins with a saxophone obligato played over a slow snare drum roll, as in a New Orleans funeral march.' A mixture of churchified reverence, sardonic dance melodies, and snatches of folk song, the piece feels, despite its title, more like an open question than affirmative resolution."

== Track listing ==
All compositions by Marion Brown.

1. "La Sorrela" – 12:35
2. "Fortunato" – 8:30
3. "Why Not" – 6:50
4. "Homecoming" – 10:00

Recorded October 23, 1966 in New York City.

== Personnel ==
- Marion Brown – alto saxophone
- Stanley Cowell – piano
- Sirone (Norris Jones) – bass
- Rashied Ali – drums
