= Margy Pargy =

Studio album by Dave Burrell
- Released: March 9, 2005
- Genre: Jazz
- Label: Splasc
- Producer: Peppo Spagnoli

Dave Burrell chronology
| Expansion (2004) | Margy Pargy (2005) | Consequences (2006) |

Professional ratings
Review scores
| Source | Rating |
|---|---|
| The Penguin Guide to Jazz Recordings | 3/4 stars |

Margy Pargy is a studio album released by jazz pianist Dave Burrell. It was released on March 9, 2005, by Splasc Records. It is a solo album and, in contrast, a week later the album After Love was released, which featured collaborations with such jazz greats as Roscoe Mitchell, Don Moye (both from the Art Ensemble of Chicago) and Ron Miller. The Penguin Guide to Jazz described it as "A quality solo set [...] The best things are standards, including a long, troublous 'Lush Life'."

== Track listing ==
1. "I Only Have Eyes for You" (Warren) — 6:28
2. "Expansion" (Burrell) — 8:00
3. "DB Blues" (Burrell) — 5:49
4. "Prelude to Crucifado" (Burrell) — 2:27
5. "Crucifado" (Burrell) — 4:58
6. "Margy Pargy" (Burrell) — 6:52
7. "Lush Life" (Strayhorn) — 9:00
8. "My Foolish Heart" (Young) — 4:15
9. "So in Love" (Porter) — 3:43

== Personnel ==
- Dave Burrell – piano
- Pete Kercher, Giacomo Pellicciotti – liner notes
- Luigi Naro – graphic design
- Luciano Rossetti – photography, cover photo
- Peppo Spagnoli – producer
- Giuseppe Emmanuele – engineer

== Reception ==
Allaboutjazz.com reviewer Rex Butters comments that Burrell "reaches effortlessly through time to retrieve all flavors of the blues" to create an album that is "boasting reverent roots as well as forward vision."
