= Nicolaas Bastert =

Dutch painter

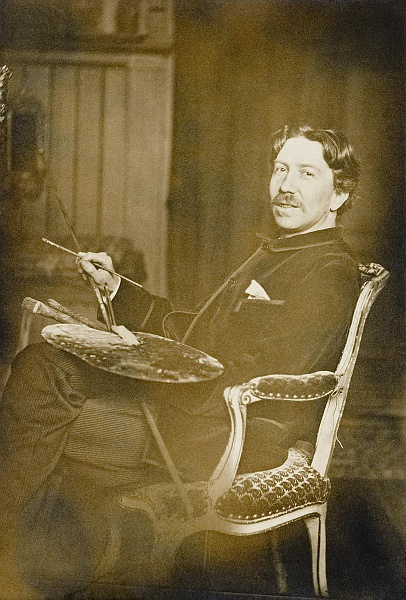
Bastert in 1893

Syvert Nicolaas Bastert (7 January 1854 – 18 April 1939), was a 19th-century Dutch landscape painter, best known for his scenes along the river Vecht. He is counted among the "second generation" of the Hague School.

== Biography ==
Bastert was born into a prominent family on the estate Otterspoor to Maarseveen in Maarssen. At first he seemed destined for a career in marketing and worked in the office in the trading company of his father, Jacob Nicholas Bastert, in Amsterdam. He then turned to art and was admitted to the National Academy of Fine Arts in Amsterdam in 1876. He was a pupil of August Allebé, Marinus Heijl, Petrus Josephus Lutgers, and Charles Verlat at the Rijksakademie van beeldende kunsten in Amsterdam. In the studio of Marinus Heijl he met the young painter George Poggenbeek, with whom he would remain lifelong friends.

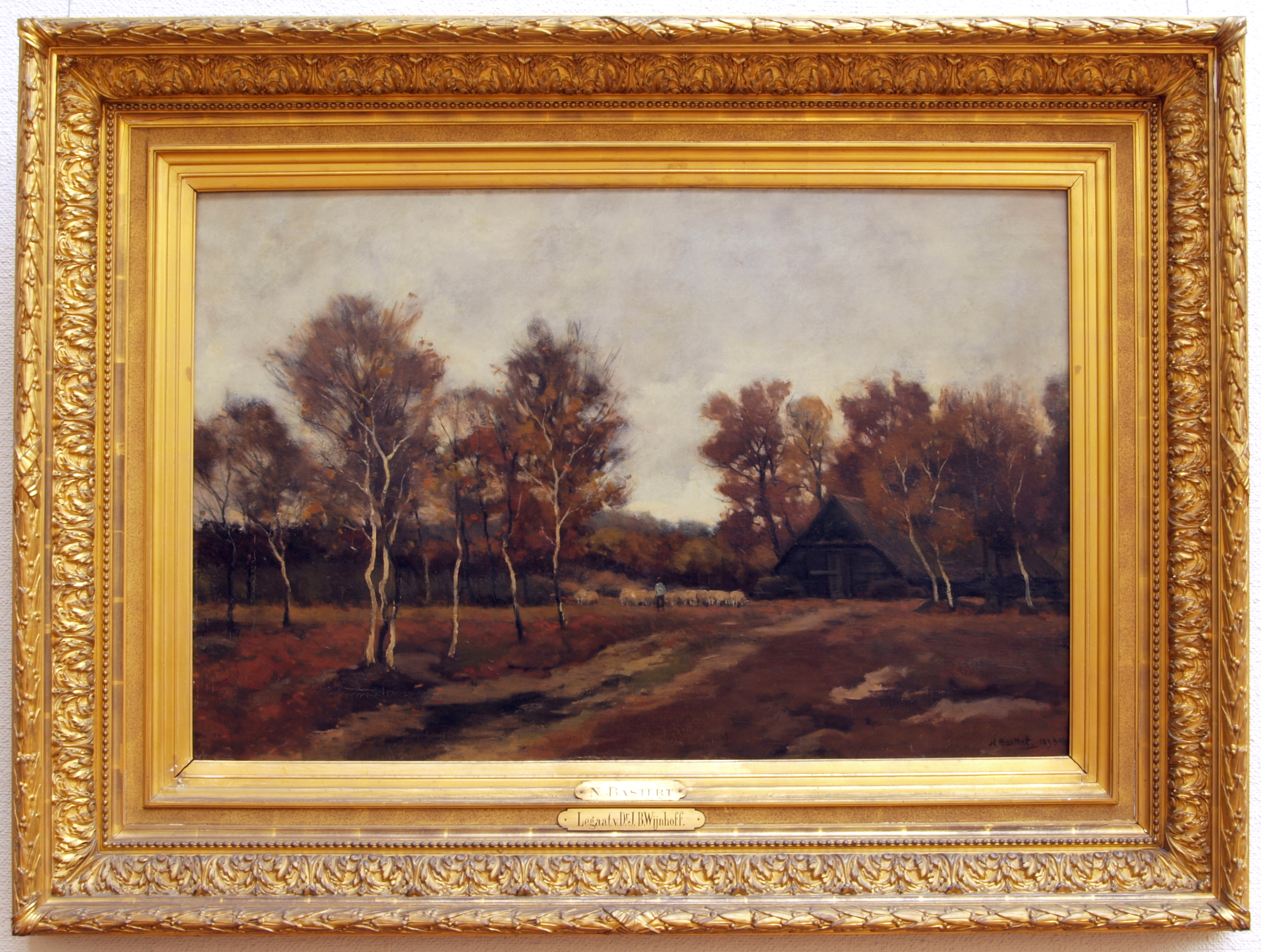
Sheepfold (1893)

In 1878 Bastert, following a winter course at the Royal Academy of Fine Arts in Antwerp, and met with Hein Kever and Theo Hanrath. He then traveled with Poggenbeek through Switzerland, Italy and France, a period Bastert would describe as "a great pleasure". He studied at the Koninklijke Academie voor Schone Kunsten in Antwerp in 1879 and about the same time became a member of Arti et Amicitiae in Amsterdam and the Hollandsche Teekenmaatschappij. Between 1880 and 1882 he lived and worked with Poggenbeek in Amsterdam, in the studio of Poggenbeek at the City Gardens. Together they would often travel to a cottage in Breukelen in the next seven years to paint Dutch landscapes. There Bastert did many paintings near the river Vecht, both in Breukelen and Maarssen Nieuwersluis.

In 1882 Bastert had a private studio in The Hague. His style was strongly influenced by the painters of the Hague School. He soon attracted attention with his work. The art critic Jan Veth called him in May 1888 "The king of light". He wrote: " In the place where Bastert's paintings hang, there is a window through which one can behold all the glory of the Vecht." From 1885 it was regularly sold his work, which allowed him to develop his own style. During his time in The Hague, Bastert often felt lonely. In 1885, therefore, he moved into a studio in the State Oosterpark in Amsterdam, next to that of Poggenbeek. Later, after his marriage to Eva Versteeg, he settled on the estate Zwaanvecht te Nigtevecht. In the first decades of the twentieth century, he often painted in the picturesque village of Heeze.

Bastert won gold medals at exhibitions in Amsterdam, Munich and Paris. He was a member of the Academy of Fine Arts in Rotterdam, Arti et Amicitiae in Amsterdam and the Pulchri Studio in The Hague, where most of the members were in the Hague School. His pupils were Constantia Arnolda Balwé, Leo Kurpershoek, Marie van Regteren Altena, and Eva Emmelina Seelig.

Bastert died in 1939, at the age of 85, in Loenen aan de Vecht. In 1895 the Van Wisselingh firm of art dealers had a solo exhibition of Bastert's works and after his death they did the same for his later works.

== Gallery ==
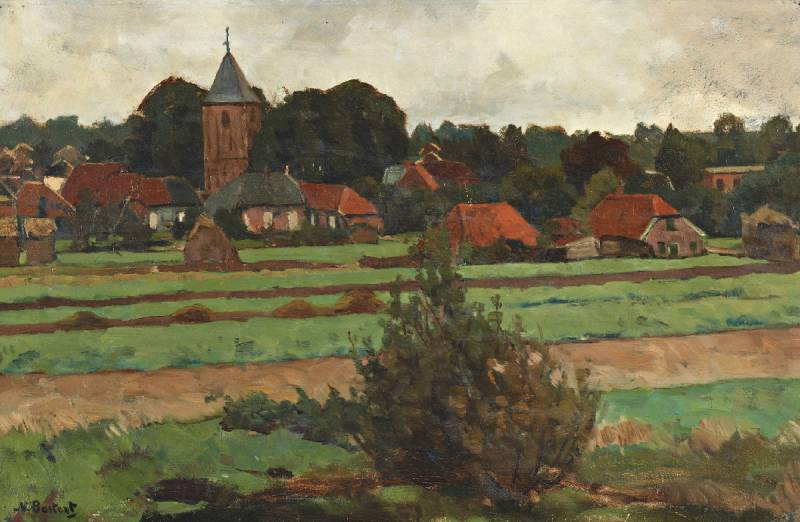
Village Scene (Loenen)

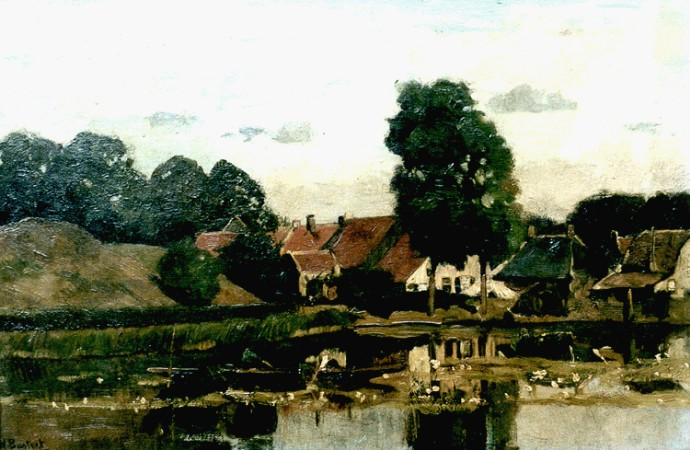
Fort Canal to Nieuwersluis

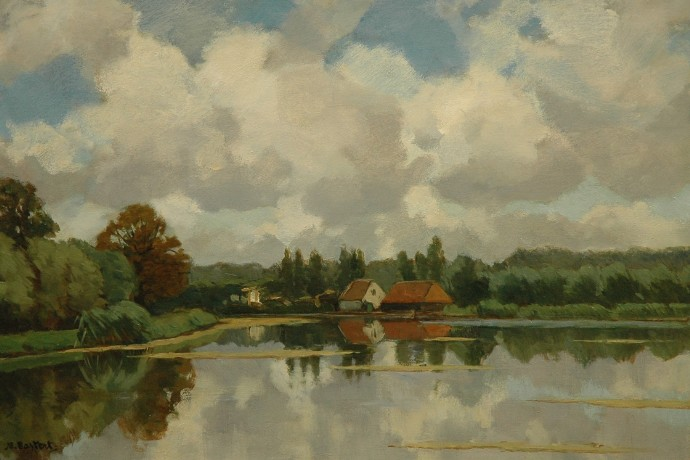
On the Water at Loenen

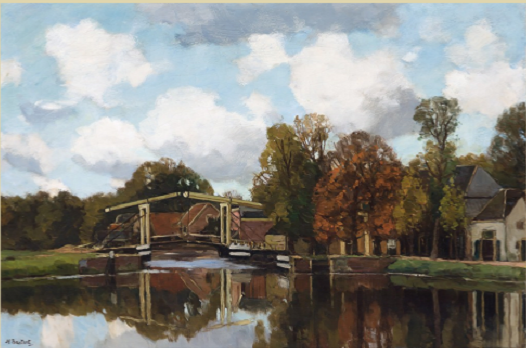
Along the Vecht

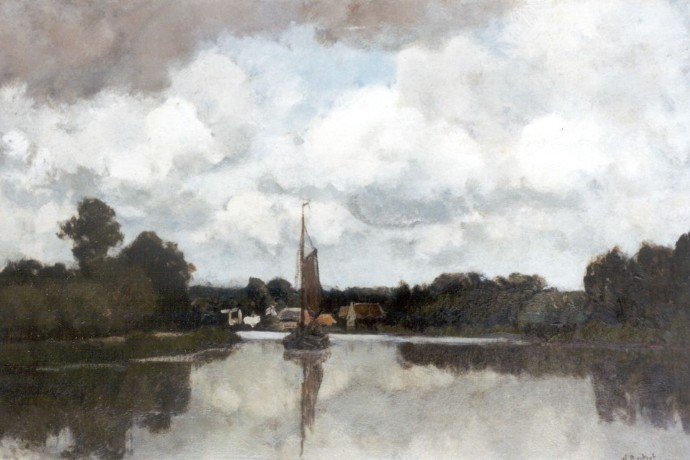
Vecht Landscape

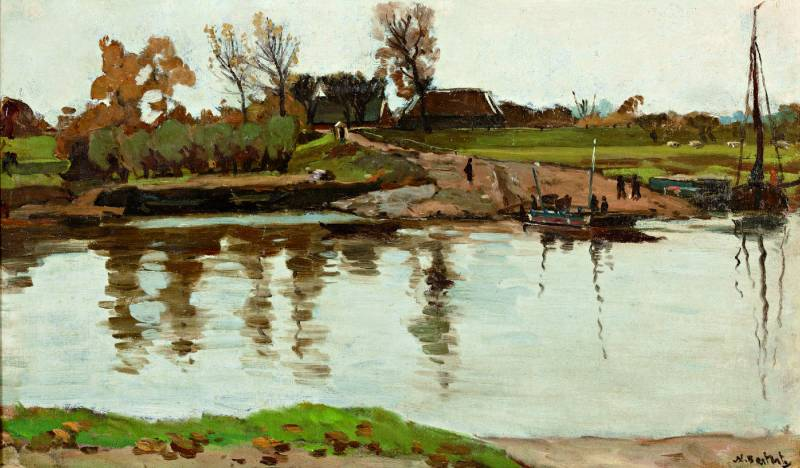
Ferry on the Vecht

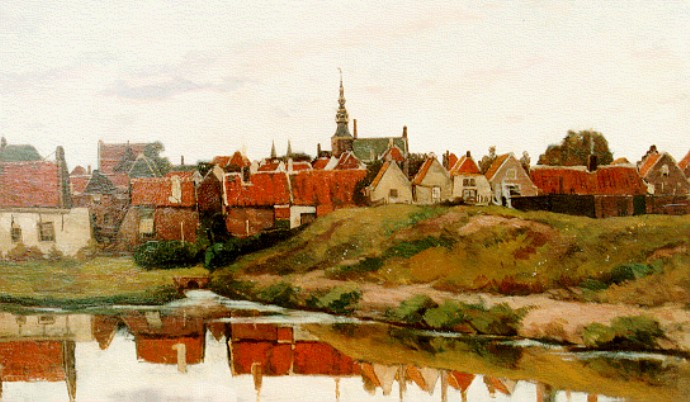
Scene on the Zierikzee

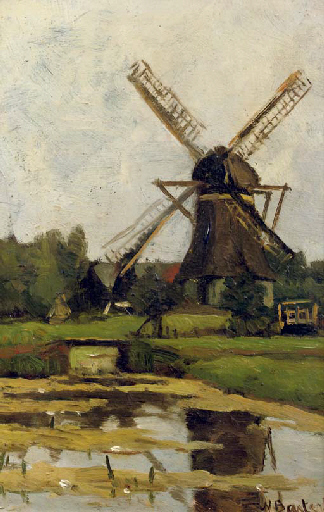
The Windmill

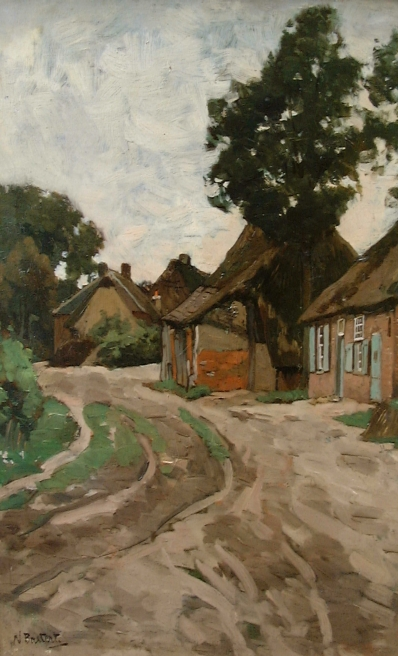
Farms in Heeze

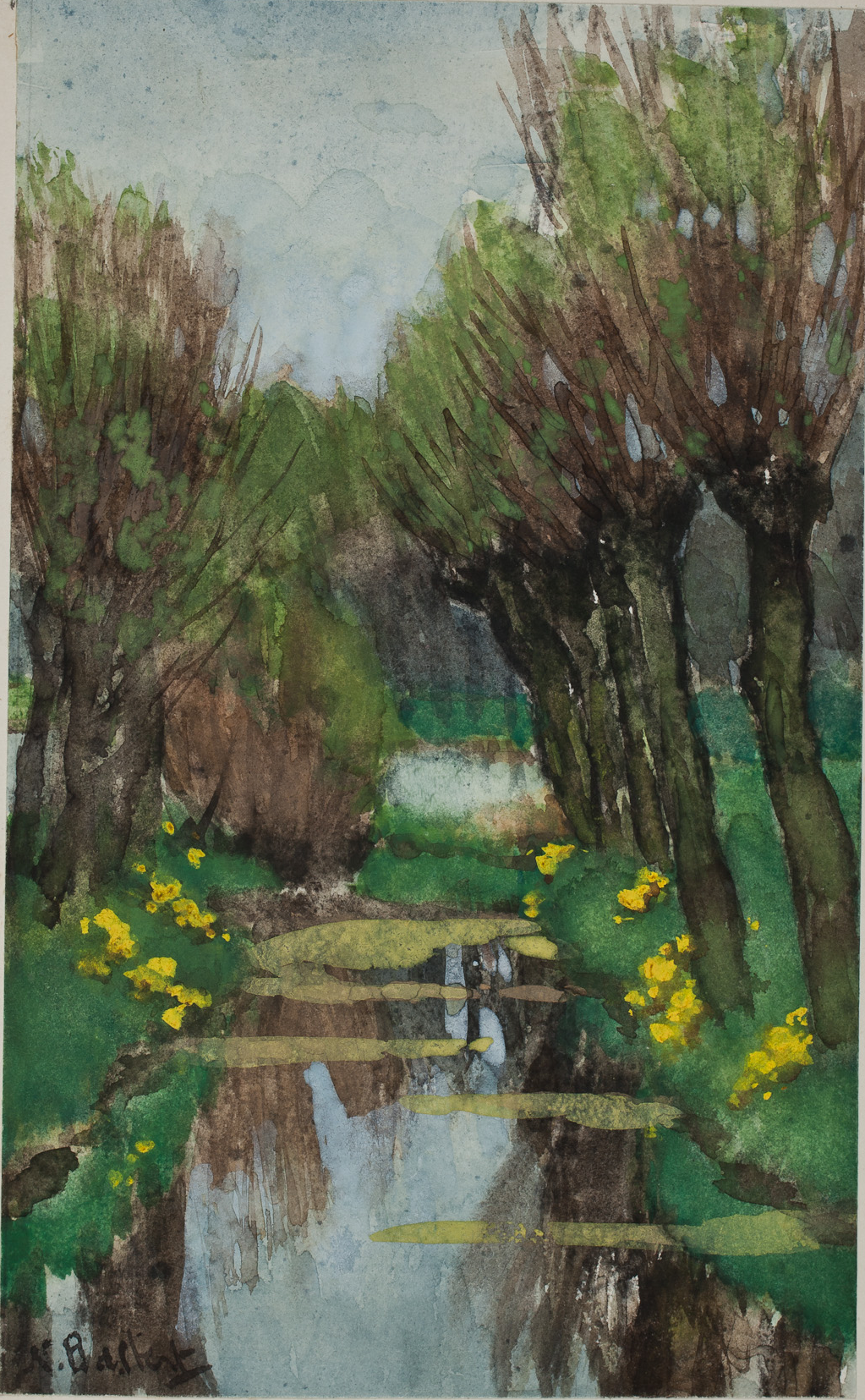
Illustration in the autograph album of Rudolf Hugo Driessen

== Sources ==
- Nicolaas Bastert on Artnet
- Wiepke Loos, Watercolors of the Hague School: the collection Drucker-Fraser, Amsterdam (Rijksmuseum) and Zwolle (Waanders) 2002. ISBN 90-400-8706-7
