= Martinus van Regteren Altena =

Dutch painter, etcher, lithographer (1866–1908)

- Born: 19 September 1866; Amsterdam, Netherlands
- Died: 10 October 1908 (aged 42); Nunspeet, Netherlands
- Education: Delft Technical University; Rijksakademie van beeldende kunsten (1891–1894)
- Occupations: Painter, etcher and lithographer
- Relatives: Marie van Regteren Altena (brother); Iohan Quirijn van Regteren Altena (uncle)

Martinus van Regteren Altena (19 September 1866 – 10 October 1908) was a Dutch portrait painter, etcher and lithographer.

He mainly produced portraits but also worked in design. He was a member of "Arti et Amicitiae" in Amsterdam and exhibited in Amsterdam from 1901 until 1906.

== Life ==
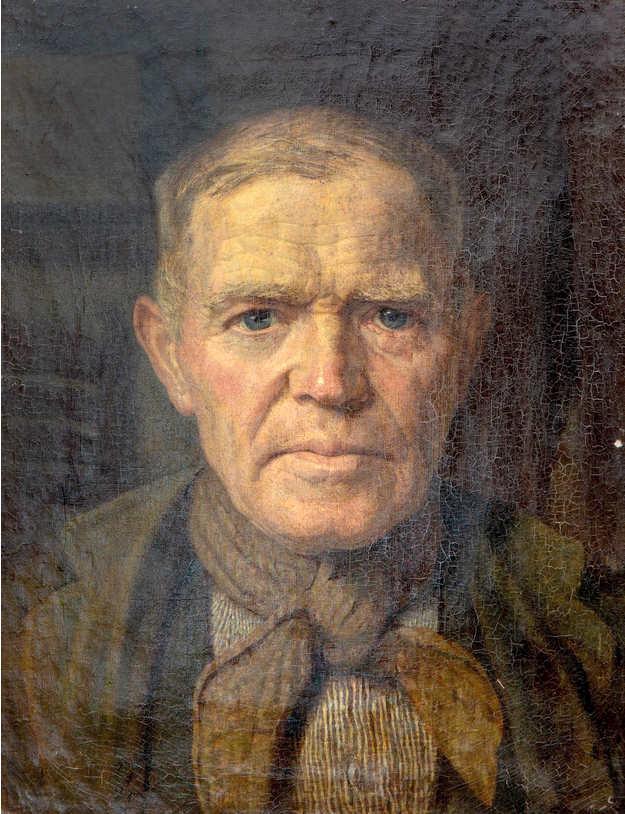
Portrait of a Farmer from Delden by Martinus van Regteren Altena.

Born in Amsterdam, he was a son of Johan Quirijn van Regteren Altena, director of the Deli Maatschappij, and Gerardina Maria Jonker, making him brother to the painter Marie van Regteren Altena and uncle to the art historian Iohan Quirijn van Regteren Altena.

He initially studied at Delft Technical University, gaining a diploma as a civil engineer. He studied from 1891 to 1894 at the Rijksakademie van beeldende kunsten (State Academy of Fine Arts) in Amsterdam under Wilhelmus Hendrikus Petrus Johannes de Zwart. He became an employee of Jan Veth.

He lived and worked in Amsterdam from 1891 to 1894, Paris 1897 to 1899, Laren, North Holland, until 1902, Bussum until 1906, then in Nunspeet, where he died of tuberculosis.
