= Consequences (Dave Burrell album) =

Live album by Dave Burrell
- Released: June 13, 2006
- Recorded: October 10, 2005
- Genre: Jazz, avant-garde
- Label: Amulet
- Producer: Katsuhiko Naito

Dave Burrell chronology
Margy Pargy (2005)	Consequences (2006)	Momentum (2006)

Consequences is a live album released by jazz pianist Dave Burrell in duet with drummer Billy Martin of Medeski, Martin & Wood. It was recorded on October 10, 2005, at the University of Pennsylvania's Houston Hall in Philadelphia, Pennsylvania. It was released on June 13, 2006, by the Amulet Records.

Burrell and Martin perform quite forcefully throughout the show, leading to a style that is "not mildly avant-garde; it is very avant-garde."

== Track listing ==
1. "Monsoon" (Burrell) – 18:36
2. "New Species" (Martin) – 10:10
3. "Moonbows" (Martin) – 9:21
4. "Suspension" (Burrell) – 11:30
5. "Kuliana" (Martin) – 9:06

== Personnel ==
- Dave Burrell — piano
- Billy Martin — percussion, cover design
- Yalitza Ferreras — package design
- Katsuhiko Naito — mastering, mixing

== Reception ==
Professional ratings
Review scores
Source	Rating
AllMusic	4/5 stars
The Penguin Guide to Jazz Recordings	3.5/4 stars

AllMusic reviewer Alex Henderson comments that the album is not for the light of heart in jazz and who haven't been exposed to avant-garde. However, he does say that those who do appreciate the genre "will find a lot to enjoy about Burrell's inspired outside duets with Martin." Allaboutjazz.com reviewer Robert Iannapollo says the playing "shows Burrell’s creativity still flowing freely."
