= La Vie de Bohème (album) =

La Vie de Boheme

Studio album by Dave Burrell
- Released: December 21, 1969
- Genre: Jazz
- Label: BYG
- Producer: Michael Cuscuna; Alan Douglas

Dave Burrell chronology
High Won-High Two (1968)	La Vie de Boheme (1969)	Echo (1969)

Professional ratings
Review scores
Source	Rating
Allmusic	4/5 stars

La Vie de Bohème is a studio album released by jazz pianist Dave Burrell. The album is Burrell's take on the 1896 operatic adaptation of Henri Murger's 1851 novel La Vie de Bohème by Giacomo Puccini, titled La bohème. The album has been called "a fine example of the similarities between the free jazz and classical worlds." Though this is not a straight performance of the opera, each of the acts are represented with "a great deal of improvisation."

== Track listing ==
1. "First Act" — 20:00
2. "Second Act (1st Part)" — 5:00
3. "Second Act (2nd Part)" — 12:00
4. "Third Act" — 5:15
5. "Fourth Act" — 7:45

== Personnel ==
- Dave Burrell — piano
- Eleanor Burrell — vocals
- Ric Colbeck — piano, trumpet, harp
- Claude Delcloo — chimes, drums, tympani
- Beb Guérin — bass
- Grachan Moncur III — trombone, chimes
- Kenneth Terroade — flute, saxophone (tenor)
