= Expansion (album) =

Live album by Dave Burrell
- Released: June 8, 2004
- Recorded: December 2003
- Genre: Avant-garde jazz
- Label: High Two Records
- Producer: Dave Burrell

Dave Burrell chronology
Recital (2001)	Expansion (2004)	Margy Pargy (2005)

Expansion is a live album released by jazz pianist Dave Burrell. It was recorded during a number of concerts in December 2003 and was released on June 8, 2004 by High Two.

The group that Burrell toured with was referred to as the Full-Blown Trio and included Burrell, Andrew Cyrille (drums) and William Parker (bass).

== Reception ==
Professional ratings
Review scores
Source	Rating
AllMusic	3.5/5 stars
PGJ	3/4 stars

AllMusic calls the album "a lovely record ... by a trio versed in understatement and nuance." Reviewer Thom Jurek in particular comments on Burrell's playing by saying that his "fills between the lyric lines are humorous, warm, and dazzling." The Penguin Guide to Jazz also mention that the three men "gel perfectly" and they provide him with the most flattering context for years."

== Track listing ==
All tracks by Dave Burrell except where noted.

1. "Expansion" – 4:10
2. "Double Heartbeat" – 8:14
3. "Cryin' Out Loud" – 7:43
4. "They Say It's Wonderful" (Irving Berlin) – 6:52
5. "About Face" – 5:40
6. "In the Balance" – 4:38
7. "Coup d'État" – 3:14

== Personnel ==
- Dave Burrell – piano
- William Parker – bass, kora
- Andrew Cyrille – drums
- Shawn Brackbill – session photographer
- Flam – mastering
- John Rosenberg – engineer
