= Lush Life (Dave Burrell album) =

Studio album by Dave Burrell
- Released: April 2, 1978
- Genre: Jazz
- Label: Denon

Dave Burrell chronology
Dave Burrell Plays Ellington & Monk (1978)	Lush Life (1978)	Round Midnight (1979)

Professional ratings
Review scores
Source	Rating
Allmusic	3/5 stars

Lush Life is a studio album released by jazz pianist Dave Burrell. It was first released by Denon Records on April 2, 1978.

The first four songs were also featured on the previous Burrell album Dave Burrell Plays Ellington & Monk. Allmusic comments that the rest of the album, Burrell's own compositions, "are very listenable though none are particularly memorable."

== Track listing ==
1. "In a Sentimental Mood" (Ellington, Kurtz, Mills) — 5:20
2. "Lush Life" (Strayhorn) — 6:58
3. "Come Sunday" (Ellington) — 4:47
4. "A Flower Is a Lovesome Thing" (Strayhorn) — 2:04
5. "Mexico City" (Burrell) — 3:05
6. "Tradewinds" (Burrell) — 7:02
7. "Crucificade" (Burrell) — 4:54
8. "Budapest Conclusion" (Burrell) — 3:42

== Personnel ==
- Dave Burrell — piano
- Takashi Mizuhashi — bass
