= In: Sanity =

Studio album by The 360 Degree Music Experience
- Released: 1976
- Recorded: March 8 & 9, 1976
- Genre: Jazz
- Length: 78:36
- Label: Black Saint

The 360 Degree Music Experience chronology
From Ragtime to No Time (1975)	In: Sanity (1976)	Beautiful Africa (1979)

In: Sanity is an album by American jazz group The 360 Degree Music Experience led by drummer Beaver Harris and pianist Dave Burrell recorded in 1976 for the Italian Black Saint label.

== Reception ==
The Allmusic review by Michael G. Nastos awarded the album four stars, calling it "Improvisational music with world music touches... An essential purchase for the adventurous listener". The Rolling Stone Jazz and Blues Album Guide also gave it four stars. Musichound Jazz called it "one of their best albums": "Typically wide ranging, it includes one certified classic: 'Sahara,' in which a steel pan orchestra meets collective jazz improvisation."

Professional ratings
Review scores
Source	Rating
Allmusic	4/5 stars
The Rolling Stone Jazz Record Guide	4/5 stars

== Track listing ==
1. "Tradewinds" (Dave Burrell) - 6:31
2. "In: Sanity Suite Part I: Skull Job" (Baver Harris) - 6:46
3. "In: Sanity Suite Part II: TM's Top" (Harris) - 4:25
4. "In: Sanity Suite Part III: Complete Operation" (Harris) - 18:42
5. "Open" (Harris) 21:30
6. "Full, Deep and Mellow" (Hamiet Bluiett) - 6:31
7. "Sahara" (Francis Haynes) - 9:15

- Recorded at Generation Sound Studios in New York City on March 8 & 9, 1976

== Personnel ==
- Beaver Harris - drums
- Dave Burrell - piano, organ, celeste
- Keith Marks - flute
- Azar Lawrence - tenor saxophone
- Hamiet Bluiett - baritone saxophone, alto clarinet, flute
- Cecil McBee - bass
- Sunil Garg - sitar
- Titos Sompa - conga
- Steel Ensemble: Francis Haynes, Roger Sardinha, Coleridge Barbour, Alston Jack, Michael Sorzano, Lawrence McCarthy - steel drums (track 7)
