= George Poggenbeek =

Dutch painter

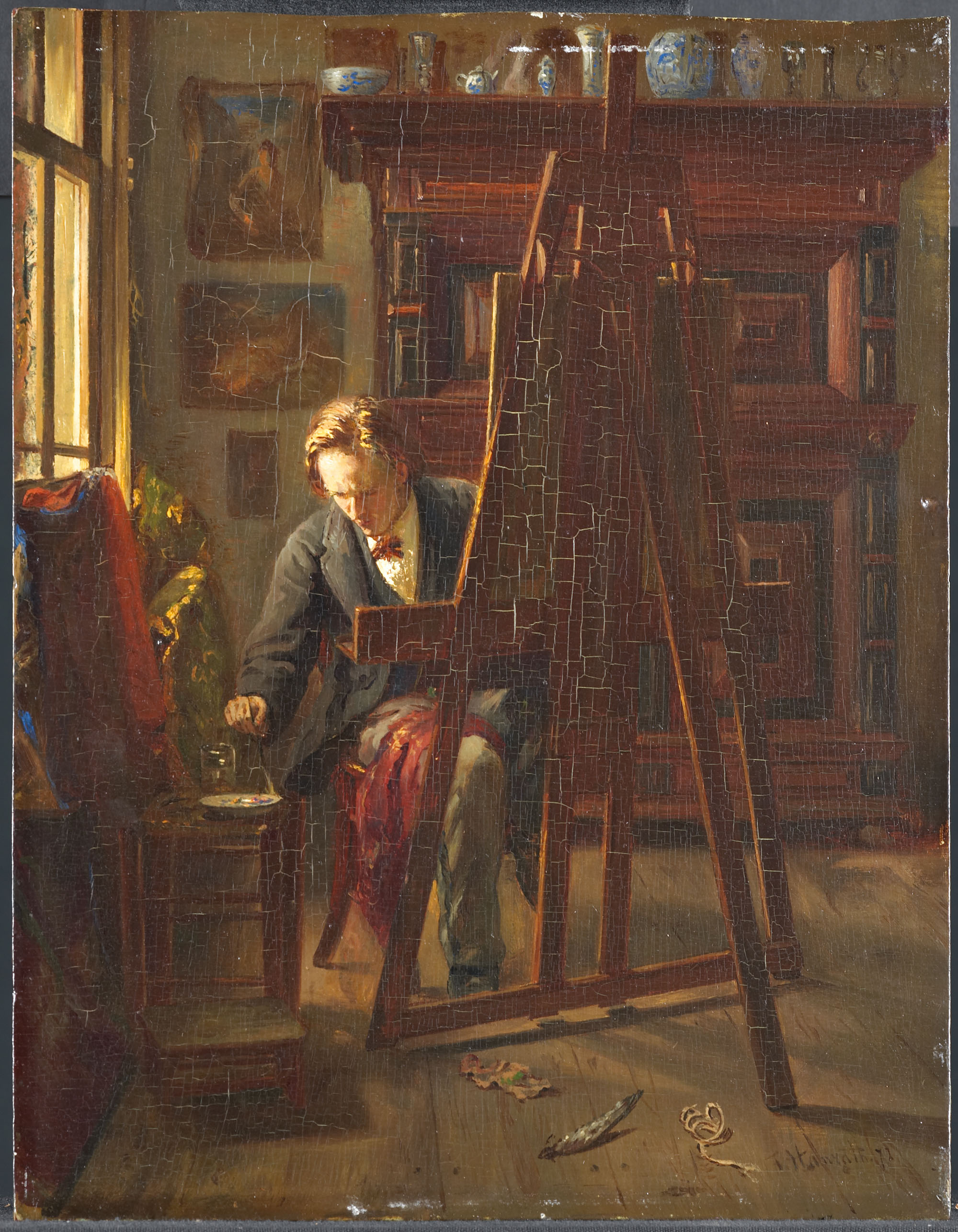
Geo Poggenbeek in his Studio, by Theo Hanrath

George Jan Hendrik (Geo) Poggenbeek (1853–1903) was a 19th-century painter from Amsterdam, the Netherlands who maintained close contact with the Hague School.

== Biography ==
Poggenbeek began painting at the age of nineteen, first studying under J. D. Veldhuizen and later working at the Amsterdam Rijksakademie van beeldende kunsten. For a while he painted ducks and calves under willows exactly like Willem Maris, but he more lastingly influenced by Anton Mauve, whose soft, light tone and delicate quiet lyricism he shared. His tonality and composition also show the influence of Boudin, Corot and Jongkind. From 1880 to 1885 he travelled to Italy, where he spent time in Venice and on the island of Capri.

He spent much of his time with his painter friend, Nicolaas Bastert, with whom he lived at Breukelen for seven years and with whom he traveled to France. Each influenced the other but Poggenbeek, the more progressive, generally gave the sky a smaller place in his compositions, in which elements are related in a broadly geometric arrangement. He is best known for studies in oil and watercolor of the old towns of Holland and Normandy.

In Amsterdam Poggenbeek painted various cityscapes in a style strongly reminiscent of George Breitner. Some of these works are now among the best of his works. In 1893, 1895 and 1897, he again made study trips to France. According to the RKD he gave advice to the painter Hendrik Bloem, and taught Marie van Regteren Altena and Johan Frederik Cornelis Scherrewitz. He was second secretary of Arti et Amicitiae from 1886, chairman 1889–1890, and second chairman 1898–1903.

Poggenbeek was also known as a good etcher. He was the teacher of Johan Scherrewitz (1868–1951). He won medals at exhibitions in Paris (1894), Chicago (1895) and Berlin (1895).

He died in 1903 at the age of 49. His work can be found among others in the Rijksmuseum in Amsterdam and the Gemeentemuseum Den Haag, as well as in numerous collections of institutions and individuals both at home and abroad.

== Gallery ==
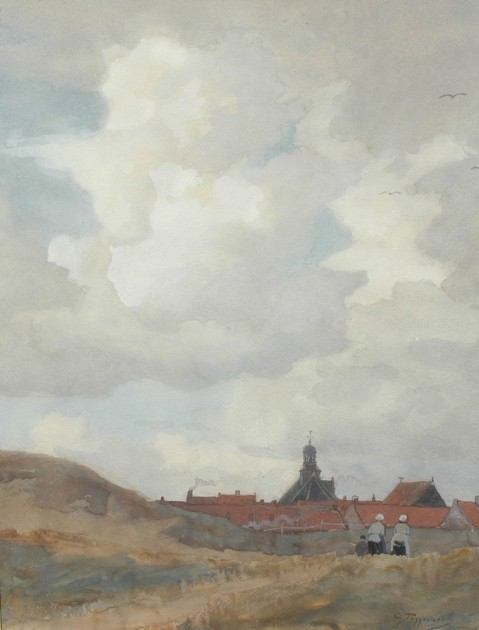
Duinen bij Noordwijk aan Zee met huiswaarts kerende vissersvrouwen

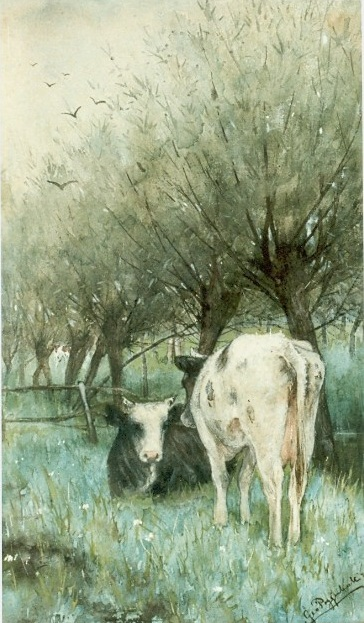
Kalfjes bij knotwilg

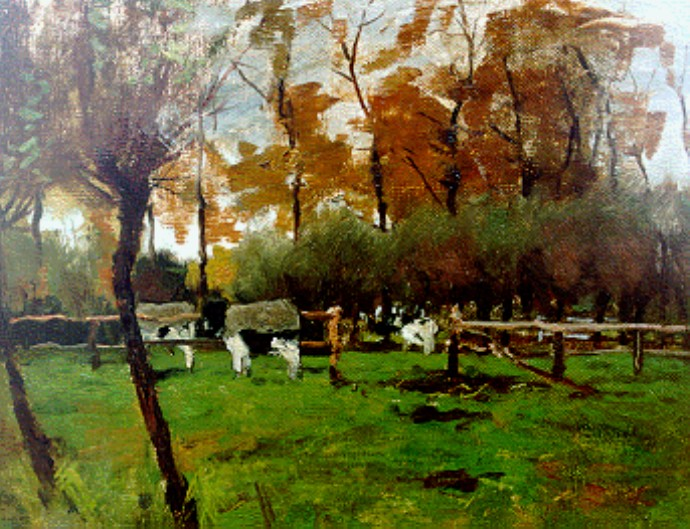
Koeien bij een hek

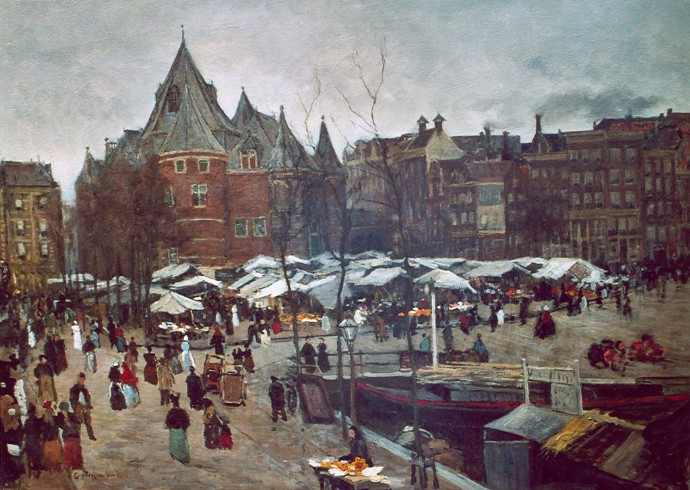
Marktdag op de Nieuwmarkt, Amsterdam

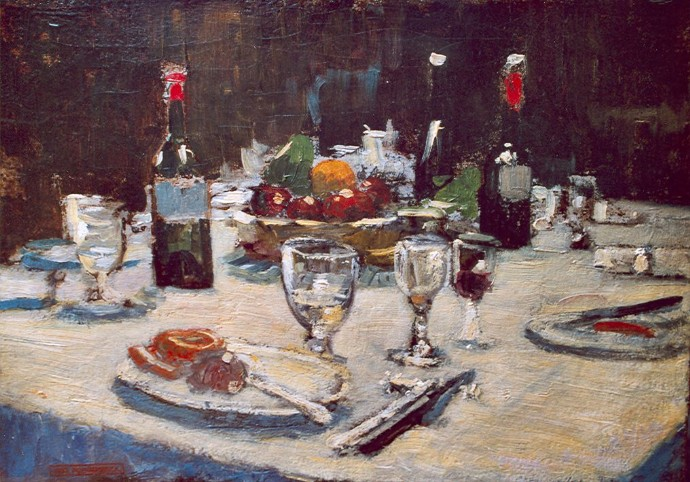
Feestdis

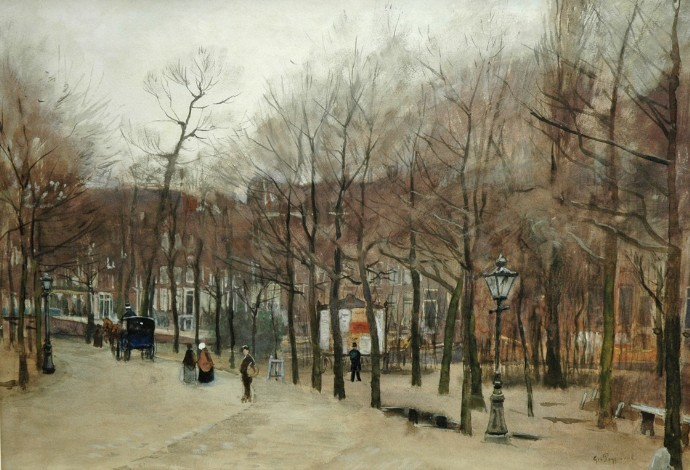
Amsterdams straatgezicht met figuren

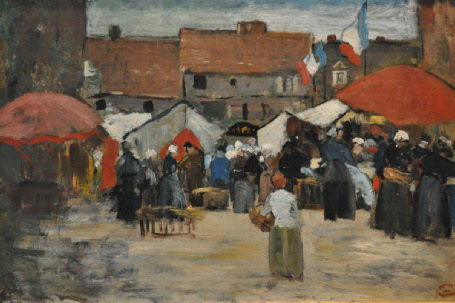
Op de markt, Frankrijk

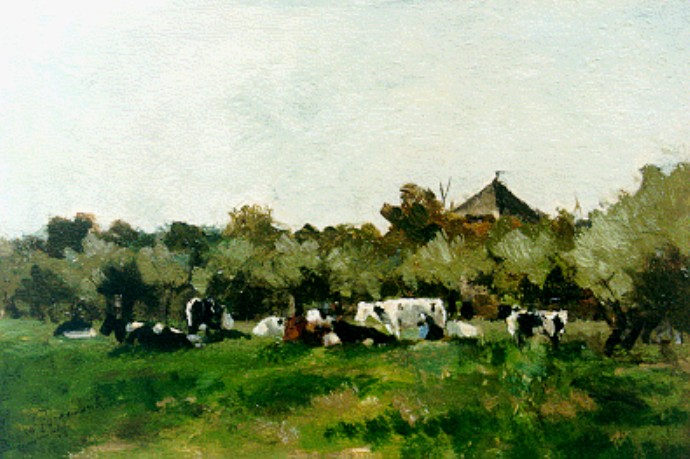
Melktijd

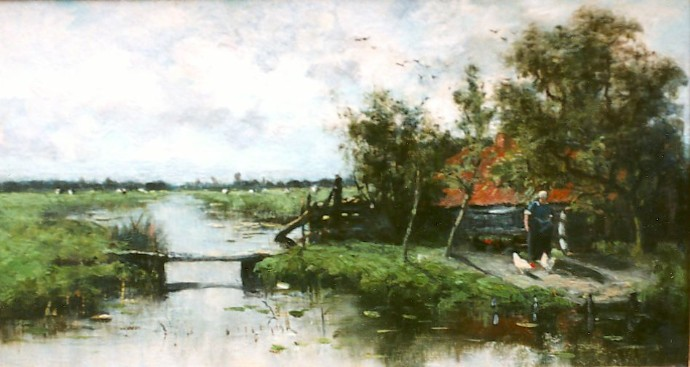
Rivierlandschap

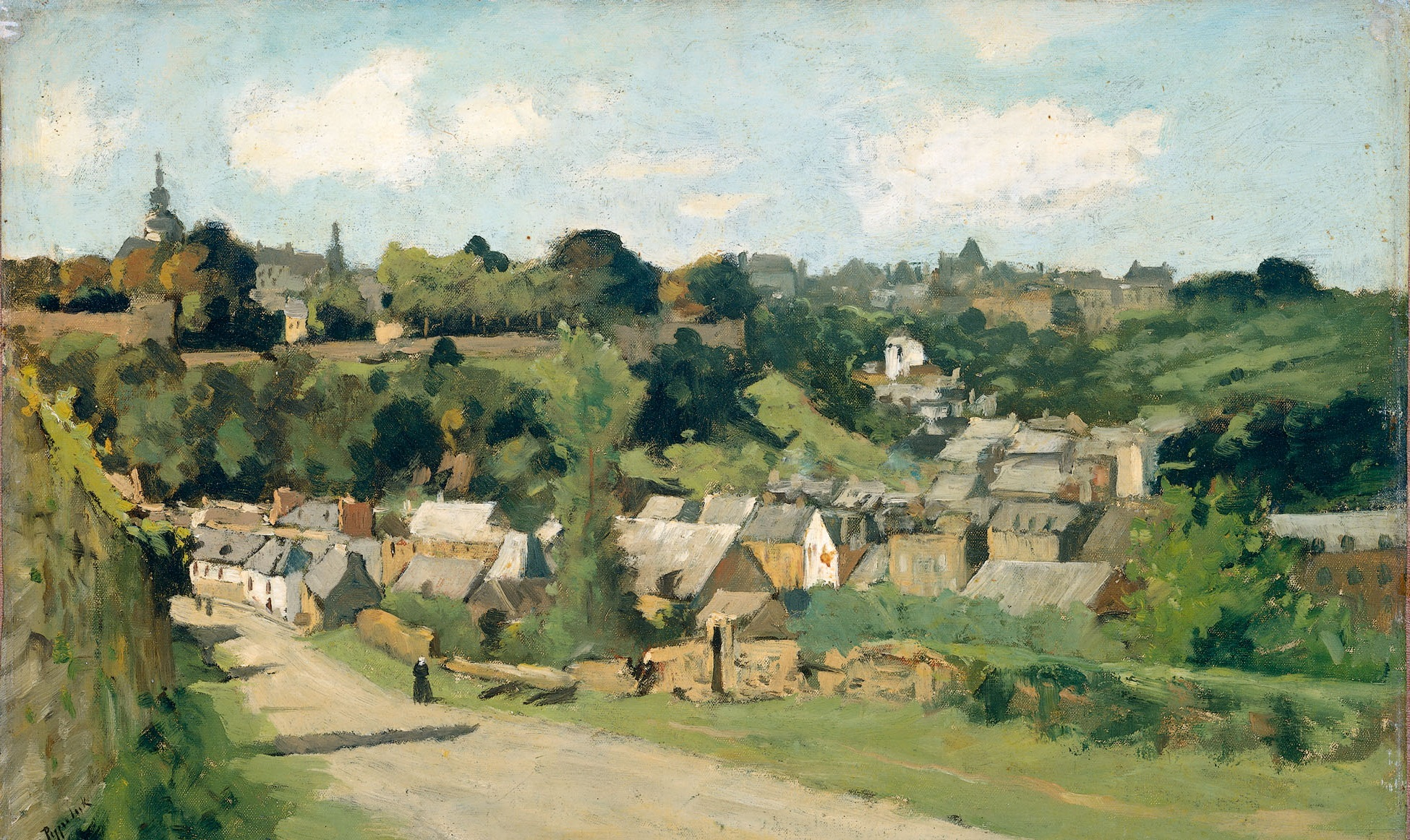
Gezicht op Dinan
