= The Jelly Roll Joys =

Studio album by Dave Burrell
- Released: 1991
- Recorded: 1990
- Genre: Jazz; Avant-garde; Post-bop
- Length: 41:01
- Label: Gazell Records
- Producer: Samuel Charters

Dave Burrell chronology
In Concert (1991)	The Jelly Roll Joys (1991)	Windward Passages (Black Saint) (1993)

The Jelly Roll Joys is an album by jazz pianist Dave Burrell. It was recorded in 1990 and released in 1991 by Gazell Records.

== Reception ==
Professional ratings
Review scores
Source	Rating
AllMusic	4/5 stars
The Penguin Guide to Jazz	4/4 stars

AllMusic gushes for this album, commenting that Burrell has contributed some "utterly gorgeous compositions." Reviewer Brian Olewnick states that this album is "highly recommended both as a wonderful recital and as one of the most rewarding albums by a musician deserving far greater renown."

== Track listing ==
1. "The Pearls" (Morton) — 6:32
2. "New Orleans Blues" (Morton) — 4:09
3. "Billy's Bounce" (Parker) — 2:01
4. "Spanish Swat" (Morton) — 6:45
5. "Giant Steps" (Coltrane) — 2:06
6. "Freakish" (Morton) — 6:32
7. "A.M. Rag" (Burrell) — 3:01
8. "Popolo Paniolo" (Burrell) — 2:59
9. "The Crave" (Morton) — 4:39
10. "Moment's Notice" (Coltrane) — 4:34

== Personnel ==
- Dave Burrell — piano
- Glenn Barratt — engineer
- Nora Charters — photography
- Samuel Charters — producer, liner notes
