= David Tamura =

Japanese-American instrumentalist

David Tamura was a Japanese-American multi-instrumentalist based in New York City, US. He was a member of Von LMO's band on the album Red Resistor, which was described as "brilliantly tight". He had played with many musicians on the New York noise rock scene. He died on June 24, 2023 at the age of 69.

He was one of the main forces behind The Jazzfakers, where he played guitar, keyboards, and saxophone; one reviewer writes "it's him that provides the powdery, blues-rich tenor melody that boards the loose-boned march of Oh Rise New, adding a recognizable jazz voice to the restless buzz-keyboard swirls and mosquito-drill guitar, the rambling bass tune and the childlike organ which hangs and fidgets on a single disruptive chord". Of his release Mystic Mountain, with Marc Edwards, Grego Applegate Edwards wrote "David Tamura adds a welcome and contrastively volcanic tenor sax. But then the threesome of Karl Alfonso Evangelista, Colin Sanderson and Alex Lozupone, the three on very high-crank electric guitars, Alex (who also is leader of the band Eighty-Pound Pug that I have happily covered here) on combo electric guitar and bass." In April, 2023, Tamura recorded an album with the group Toadal Package, which was called Final Entrance in a tribute to Last Exit.

Upon his death, Rachel Mason wrote: "He just had a true genuine quality of kindness - despite the appearance of being some kind of underground-street-gangster. This sight of him was a character out of Quinten Tarantino movie. Exuding cool. Arms filled with tattoos, and a jet black hair almost looking like fire folding around his face. Arms that were Crazy guns- and then the saxophone. He busted it out and he was just a full fledged experimental jazz machine. He really was A Comic book action hero."

== Partial discography ==
- Charles K. Noyes and David Tamura - duets (1978)
- Von LMO - Red Resistor (1996)
- Julian Cope – Copendium: An Expedition Into The Rock 'N' Roll Underworld (2012)* Ron Anderson / Robert L. Pepper* / David Tamura / Philippe Petit – Closed Encounters Of The 4 Minds (2012)
- Scott Rifkin's Music for the Free World (feat. David Tamura, Yuko Pepe & Sky Hall) (2013)
- Dave Burrells Conception - (featuring Dave Burrell, Joe Chonto, David Tamura) (2013)
- Gene Janas / Matt Luczak / Gene Moore / David Tamura - Music On Monroe Street: Live At Downtown Music Gallery (2014)
- Zilmrah - Looming
- Big Brother On Acid – Big Brother On Acid (2014)

=== with The Jazzfakers ===
- Jazzfakers (2010)
- Two (2011)
- Here Is Now (2012)
- Hallucinations (2016)
- Little Water Radio Recordings (2021)

=== with Eighty-pound Pug ===
- Poodle: Live And Totally Improvised At Spectrum (2013) Video from 2013: Eighty-pound Pug Opening Track at Spectrum 1
- When The Flowers Bloom In Baltimore (Live In New York City) (2015)
- Speechless w/ Nonoko Yoshida (2015)
- Thoughts w/ Daniel Carter (2016)
- An EP, an LP and a Single (2016)
- First Meetings

=== with Pas Musique ===
- Reconstruction
- "Venemous" Movie, directed by Robert L. Pepper

=== with The Chonto/Tamura Sonic Insurgency ===
- w/ Kidd Jordan (2011)
- Promises Kept w/ Sabir Mateen

=== with Marc Edwards ===
- Marc Edwards & Slipstream Time Travel, Mystic Mountain: Trouble in the Carina Nebula (2015)
- Marc Edwards & Slipstream Time Travel, There’s a Problem in the Keyhole Nebula! (2016)

=== David Tamura + Toadal Package ===
- Final Entrance (2023)
