= Cosmic Interception =

Studio album by Von LMO
- Released: February 1994
- Recorded: 1979 – 1994
- Studio: Skyline Studios, NYC; Otto Von Ruggins' studio
- Genre: Post-punk, space rock, no wave, noise rock, free jazz
- Length: 55:08
- Label: Variant
- Producer: Peter Crowley, Otto Von Ruggins

Von LMO chronology
Future Language (1981)	Cosmic Interception (1994)	Red Resistor (1996)

Cosmic Interception is the second studio album by Von LMO, released in February 1994 by Variant Records. It comprises tracks recorded in 1979 and the songs "Cosmic Interception" and "Inside Shadowland", which were recorded in 1994 with Otto Von Ruggins.

== Track listing ==
All tracks are written by Von LMO, except "Shake, Rattle & Roll" by Charles E. Calhoun.

No.	Title	Length
1.	"Cosmic Interception" (Red Transistor Radio mix)	3:25
2.	"Radio World"	5:29
3.	"Leave Your Body"	7:12
4.	"Inside Shadowland"	5:32
5.	"Ultraviolet Light"	4:13
6.	"Be Yourself"	5:53
7.	"Shake, Rattle & Roll"	8:35
8.	"This Is Pop Rock"	3:07
9.	"Cosmic Interception" (Cosmic Truth mix)	5:52
10.	"Cosmic Interception" (Cosmic Dance mix)	5:50

== Personnel ==
Adapted from the Cosmic Interception liner notes.

- Von LMO – lead vocals, electric guitar, musical arrangement, bass programming (1, 4), drum programming (1, 4), percussion (1, 4), production (1, 4), engineering (1, 4), Illustration

Musicians

- Craig Coffin – bass guitar (2, 3, 5–8)
- Mike Cross – electric guitar (2, 3, 5–8)
- Juno Saturn – tenor saxophone (2, 3, 5–8)
- Otto Von Ruggins – keyboards (1, 4), production (1, 4), engineering (1, 4)
- Bobby Ryan – drums (2, 3, 5–8)

Production and additional personnel

- Peter Crowley – production (2, 3, 5–8)
- Ken Lee – mastering
- A. T. Michael MacDonald – assistant engineering (2, 3, 5–8)
- Milton Morales – design
- Paul Wickliffe – engineering (2, 3, 5–8)

== Release history ==
Region	Date	Label	Format	Catalog
United States	1994	Variant	CD	VCD 2001
