= High Won-High Two =

Studio album by Dave Burrell
- Released: September 9, 1968
- Recorded: February 6, 1968
- Genre: Jazz
- Length: 63:13
- Label: Black Lion Records; Freedom Records
- Producer: Michael Cuscuna; Alan Douglas

Dave Burrell chronology
High (1965)	High Won-High Two (1968)	La Vie de Bohème (1969)

Professional ratings
Review scores
Source	Rating
Allmusic	link

High Won-High Two is the second studio album released by jazz pianist Dave Burrell. It was recorded on February 9, 1968 and was first released as an LP record later that year by Black Lion Records.

== Track listing ==
1. "West Side Story Medley" — 19:49
2. "Oozi Oozi" — 3:10
3. "Bittersweet Reminiscence" — 3:45
4. "Bobby and Si" — 2:11
5. "Dave Blue" — 2:38
6. "Margie Pargie (A.M. Rag)" — 2:59
7. "East Side Colors" — 15:50
8. "Theme Stream/Dave Blue/Bittersweet Reminiscence/Bobby and Si/M" — 15:33

- Track 1 credited to Leonard Bernstein; all others are by Burrell.

== Personnel ==
- Dave Burrell — piano, arranger
- Norris Sirone Jones — bass
- Bobby Kapp, Sunny Murray — drums
- Pharoah Sanders — tambourine

Production:

- Stanley Crouch — liner notes
- Michael Cuscuna, Alan Douglas — producer
- Raymond Ross — photography
- Malcolm Walker — design
