= Porto Novo (album) =

Studio album by Marion Brown
- Released: 1967
- Recorded: December 14, 1967
- Label: Freedom

Marion Brown chronology
| Three for Shepp (1967) | Porto Novo (1967) | Why Not? (1968) |

Porto Novo is an album by American saxophonist Marion Brown. It was recorded on December 14, 1967 in Soest, The Netherlands, and was released in 1967 on the Freedom label. The album features Brown on alto saxophone, Maarten van Regteren Altena on bass, and Han Bennink on drums. The tracks were reissued on the 2020 ezz-thetics (Hat Hut) album Why Not? Porto Novo! Revisited.

Porto Novo was the result of Brown's first musical encounter with European free improvisers. According to Brown, the experience helped him transition from being a solo-oriented musician to one who was able to think both compositionally and in terms of structured improvisations.

The album title refers to the former Portuguese colony from which African slaves were sent to the Caribbean and North America.

== Reception ==
Professional ratings
Review scores
| Source | Rating |
|---|---|
| AllMusic | 4.5/5 stars |
| The Penguin Guide to Jazz | 4/4 stars |

In a review for AllMusic, Scott Yanow wrote: "This was one of altoist Marion Brown's best recordings. Although a very adventurous improviser, Brown usually brought lyricism and a thoughtful (if unpredictable) approach to his music... for this stimulating session..., Brown stretches out on five of his compositions and is heard at the peak of his creative powers."

The authors of the Penguin Guide to Jazz Recordings awarded the album 4 stars, calling it "a surprise and a delight."

Richard Baker commented: "While it may be overshadowed by the other Arista releases, Marion Brown's Porto Novo is an excellent record, one which is nearly as appealing in its own way as the spectacular Ayler Vibrations... Porto Novo is probably the most far reaching statement of Brown the altoist. All the aspects of his individual personality are revealed – what possibly impresses the most is the way Brown can move subtly from one kind of feeling to another yet hold it all together... If you have enjoyed any of Brown's playing on other records, you will want this."

Writing for Point of Departure, David Grundy remarked: "Recorded in a stripped-down trio format... the pieces here are all 'structured improvisations'... Throughout, the cavernous recording quality... and the absence of piano brings out the edge to Brown's tone, whilst also leaving plenty of ruminative space... Quicksilver and playful, Brown's transposition of a repeated phrase into the altissimo register in the title track – suggesting at once the unruly joy of the wilfully abrasive and the dedicated focus of a skilled improviser – is worth the price of admission."

== Track listing ==
All compositions by Marion Brown.

1. "Similar Limits" – 6:25
2. "Sound Structure" – 6:10
3. "Improvisation" – 5:50
4. "QBIC" – 6:32
5. "Porto Novo" – 11:55

Recorded December 14, 1967 in Soest, The Netherlands.

== Personnel ==
- Marion Brown – alto saxophone
- Maarten van Regteren Altena – bass
- Han Bennink – drums
