= Live at the Black Musicians' Conference, 1981 =

Live album by Marion Brown and Dave Burrell
- Released: 2018
- Recorded: April 10, 1981
- Venue: Black Musicians' Conference, University of Massachusetts Amherst, Massachusetts
- Genre: Free jazz
- Label: NoBusiness; NBCD 109
- Producer: Danas Mikailionis, Valerij Anosov

Marion Brown and Dave Burrell chronology
Five Improvisations (2016)	Live at the Black Musicians' Conference, 1981 (2018)	Capricorn Moon to Juba Lee Revisited (2019)

Live at the Black Musicians' Conference, 1981 is a live album by saxophonist Marion Brown and pianist Dave Burrell. It was recorded on April 10, 1981, at the Black Musicians' Conference at University of Massachusetts Amherst, Massachusetts, and was released in 2018 by NoBusiness Records. The album features two compositions by Brown, three by Burrell, and two by Billy Strayhorn.

== Reception ==
Professional ratings
Review scores
Source	Rating
All About Jazz	4.5/5 stars
All About Jazz	4/5 stars
All About Jazz	4/5 stars
DownBeat	4/5 stars
The Free Jazz Collective	4/5 stars
Tom Hull – on the Web	A−

In a review for All About Jazz, Mark Corroto called the album "a time capsule sent to the future (now) to awaken adventurous listeners to music's rich history," and wrote: "The theme constant here is a musical gentleness... Even though both of these musicians had their sound forged in the 1960's New York free jazz fires, this reunion opted for a suspension of hostilities." AAJ's John Sharpe described the album as "a jewel from the archives," and stated: "Although boasting serious fire-music credentials, you wouldn't know it from the tuneful, often swinging, blues-inflected interpretations."

Kian Banihashemi of The Free Jazz Collective commented: "The interplay between them is strong, yet kind and gentle. Brown and Burrell show a definite sense of respect and restraint around each other; their decades of working together accumulate here to create something truly wholesome and gorgeous."

Dusted Magazine's Derek Taylor praised the track titled "Punaluu Peter," noting that it "features them both apart and at their most telepathically synergistic," and remarking: "The divisions where one begins and the other ends effectively blur in spots to point where the overlay of active intellects feels almost seamless."

Writing for The New York City Jazz Record, Pierre Crépon and Parker Fishel stated: "Having explored the outer edges of experimentation, the musicians find themselves applying lessons learned to earlier jazz forms and improvisatory structures: there is no real difference between a free piece like 'Fortunato' or a standard like 'Lush Life'."

In an article for JazzWord, Ken Waxman noted Brown's "slurry, speech-like textures," commenting: "He masticates various timbres, sucking the sweetness or tartness from them." Waxman also suggested that "like a fine wine's vintage, Burrell's playing has improved and intensified as he gets older."

A writer for the Morning Star remarked: "On the final track... the melody sounds as pristine as if these two masters are reinventing it, so moving and authentic does it resonate."

== Track listing ==
1. "Gossip / Fortunado" (Marion Brown) – 17:57
2. "La Placita" (Marion Brown) – 8:36
3. "My Little Brown Book" (Billy Strayhorn) – 6:19
4. "Punaluu Peter" (Dave Burrell) – 16:08
5. "Pua Mae 'Ole" (Dave Burrell) – 5:33
6. "Crucifacado" (Dave Burrell) – 10:22
7. "Lush Life" (Billy Strayhorn) – 10:13

== Personnel ==
- Marion Brown – alto saxophone
- Dave Burrell – piano
