= Marion Brown Quartet =

Studio album by Marion Brown
- Released: 1966
- Recorded: November 1965
- Label: ESP-Disk

Marion Brown chronology
Marion Brown Quartet (1966)	Juba-Lee (1967)

Marion Brown Quartet is an album by American saxophonist Marion Brown, his debut as a leader. It was recorded in November 1965 in New York City, and was released in 1966 on the ESP-Disk label. The album features Brown on alto saxophone, Alan Shorter on trumpet, Bennie Maupin on tenor saxophone, Reggie Johnson and Ronnie Boykins on bass, and Rashied Ali on drums.

The original 1966 LP release contained three tracks: "Capricorn Moon", "27 Cooper Square", and "Exhibition", the latter with Bennie Maupin on tenor sax. Later reissues replaced "Exhibition" with Alan Shorter's composition "Mephistopheles", though the track listing on the disk labels and LP cover remained unchanged. The 2005 CD reissue (ESP 4011) contains all four tracks. "Capricorn Moon" and "Mephistopheles" also appear on the 2019 ezz-thetics (Hat Hut) album Capricorn Moon To Juba Lee Revisited.

The title of the track "27 Cooper Square" refers to an address in Manhattan's East Village which was formerly an artistic and musical hot spot, and home to LeRoi Jones, Archie Shepp, Elizabeth Murray, Sirone, among others.

A month prior to the recording of Marion Brown Quartet, Wayne Shorter, along with a band that featured his older brother Alan on flugelhorn, recorded a version of "Mephistopheles" for his album The All Seeing Eye. "Capricorn Moon" appears on the 2007 Marion Brown tribute album Sweet Earth Flower by the band His Name Is Alive.

== Reception ==
Professional ratings
Review scores
Source	Rating
AllMusic	4.5/5 stars
DownBeat	3/5 stars
The Penguin Guide to Jazz	3/4 stars
Tom Hull – on the Web	A−

In a review for AllMusic, Thom Jurek wrote: "While the music here feels, and for the most part is entirely improvised for maximum visceral effect, Brown already has his tone and style and is a clear standout. His unique phrasing and attack shows his tenderness, even in the angriest of these exchanges. He holds his own with the rhythm section and is at times lyrical and spacious... While this is not his best recording, it is memorable as an early showcase for Brown's fully developed voice, and for Boykins' and Ali's fiery playing."

Writing for Bandcamp Daily, Marc Masters commented: "Compared to the rest of the early ESP jazz catalog, Quartet is somewhat conventional, with clear structures behind each track. But Brown's playing is free and noisy, and he has a knack for venturing out without losing sight of where he started. He also draws great accompaniment from trumpeter Alan Shorter, bassist Ronnie Boykins, and future Coltrane drummer Rashied Ali. They all help Brown’s soulful growl feel personal, like he's telling you his life story through his horn."

Writing for Point of Departure, David Grundy described Brown as having a sound that "tended towards the abstrusely melodic, with a marked lyrical tendency offset by an astringent bite that could peel the paint off any wall", and also praised Shorter's playing, noting that the version of "Mephistopheles" on Marion Brown Quartet "is twice the length of that on The All-Seeing Eye, increasing the tempo from a lugubrious dirge to a faster clip. Ali's drums function like sparklers: they crackle and glow; Brown smears and drags high notes around careful, angular melodic figures, while Shorter is at first loud and declarative, before simmering to buzzing smears, as if someone were wailing with their hand over their mouth."

== Track listing ==
Tracks 1–3 by Marion Brown. Track 4 by Alan Shorter.

1. "Capricorn Moon" – 23:02
2. "27 Cooper Square" – 3:53
3. "Exhibition" – 17:59
4. "Mephistopheles" – 18:41

Recorded November 1965 in New York City.

== Personnel ==
- Marion Brown – alto saxophone
- Alan Shorter – trumpet (tracks 1, 2, 4)
- Bennie Maupin – tenor saxophone (track 3)
- Reggie Johnson – bass
- Ronnie Boykins – bass (track 1)
- Rashied Ali – drums
