= In Concert (Dave Burrell and David Murray album) =

Live album by Dave Burrell
- Released: October 21, 1991
- Recorded: 1991
- Genre: Jazz
- Label: Victo

Dave Burrell chronology
Daybreak (1989)	In Concert (1991)	The Jelly Roll Joys (1991)

In Concert is a live album released by jazz pianist Dave Burrell. It was recorded at the Victoriaville Festival in Quebec, Canada and released that same year on October 21, 1991, by Victo Records. The album features Burrell's long-time jazz collaborator David Murray on reed instruments. According to the AllMusic review, "their influence is profound and wide-reaching" on this album.

== Track listing ==
1. "Punaluu Peter" (Burrell) — 12:42
2. "Hope Scope" (Murray) — 11:17
3. "Ballad for the Black Man" (Murray) — 10:34
4. "Intuitively" (Burrell) — 9:22
5. "Teardrops for Jimmy" (Burrell) — 7:14

== Personnel ==
- Dave Burrell — piano
- David Murray — tenor saxophone

Production:

- François Bienvenue — graphic design
- Sylvain Lafleur — photography
- Jean-Pierre Loiselle — engineer
- Music Producer for Société Radio-Canada: Daniel Vachon
- Louise Trépanier — assistant engineer
- Joanne Vézina — production assistant

== Reception ==
Professional ratings
Review scores
Source	Rating
Allmusic	4.5/5 stars
The Penguin Guide to Jazz	4/4 stars

Allmusic (AMG) says that Murray can "solo gleefully" and his playing is "swinging like mad." Reviewer Thom Jurek says that the album "reveals two musicians at the very peak of their compositional, improvising, and listening skills." The Penguin Guide to Jazz notes that the album is a "perfect representation" of the "telepathic relationship" between Burrell and Murray something AMG also remarks on by calling "truly astonishing."
