= Dave Burrell Plays Ellington & Monk =

Studio album by Dave Burrell
- Released: April 2, 1978
- Genre: Post-bop; Free jazz Avant-garde music Avant-garde jazz
- Length: 47:27
- Label: Denon

Dave Burrell chronology
Echo (1969)	Dave Burrell Plays Ellington & Monk (1978)	Lush Life (1978)

Professional ratings
Review scores
Source	Rating
Allmusic	3/5 stars

Dave Burrell Plays Ellington & Monk is a studio album released by jazz pianist Dave Burrell. It was first released by Denon Records on April 2, 1978. All of the songs on the album were originally written by Duke Ellington, Ellington's partner Billy Strayhorn, or Thelonious Monk.

== Track listing ==
1. "In a Sentimental Mood" (Ellington, Kurtz, Mills) — 5:20
2. "Lush Life" (Strayhorn) — 6:58
3. "Come Sunday" (Ellington) — 4:47
4. "Straight, No Chaser" (Monk) — 8:30
5. "'Round Midnight" (Hanighen, Monk, Williams) — 7:36
6. "Blue Monk" (Monk) — 4:27
7. "Sophisticated Lady" (Ellington, Mills, Parish) — 7:42
8. "A Flower Is a Lovesome Thing" (Strayhorn) — 2:04

== Personnel ==
- Dave Burrell — piano
- Takashi Mizuhashi — bass
