= Momentum (Dave Burrell album) =

Live album by Dave Burrell
- Released: November 14, 2006
- Recorded: November 2005
- Genre: Jazz avant-garde post-bop
- Label: High Two
- Producer: Jon Rosenberg

Dave Burrell chronology
Consequences (2006)	Momentum (2006)

Momentum is a studio album released by jazz pianist Dave Burrell. It was recorded in November 2005 and released a year later on November 14, 2006, by the label High Two.

The first three tracks on the album were originally composed by Burrell to accompany the restored French silent film Body and Soul (1925) directed by Oscar Micheaux.

== Reception ==
Professional ratings
Review scores
Source	Rating
The Penguin Guide to Jazz Recordings	4/4 stars
All About Jazz	5/5 stars
AllMusic	3.5/5 stars

All About Jazz reviewer Troy Collins comments that "Burrell hones [sic] in on the jazz tradition with intensity and focus, delivering one of the finest statements of his career". AllMusic reviewer Stewart Mason describes the album as "spiky and challenging but only rarely moving into the rhythmic and tonal fearlessness of some of his more outside work".

== Track listing ==
1. "Downfall" — 5:49
2. "Broken Promise" — 5:29
3. "Fade to Black" — 5:53
4. "4:30 to Atlanta" — 6:07
5. "Cool Reception" — 8:55
6. "Momentum" — 5:06
7. "Coup d'État" — 5:58

== Personnel ==
Band:

- Dave Burrell — piano
- Guillermo E. Brown — drums
- Michael Formanek — double bass

Production:

- Shawn Brackbill — photography
- Flam — mastering
- Jon Rosenberg — engineer
