= The Chrome Cranks =

American band

The Chrome Cranks are an American punk-styled blues band based in New York City. They were originally formed in Cincinnati, Ohio, in 1988. The core membership consists of singer-guitarist Peter Aaron, guitarist William Gilmore Weber III, drummer Bob Bert, and bassist Jerry Teel.

== History ==
Aaron and Weber moved together through a variety of projects in Cincinnati starting in early 1986; The Chrome Cranks began to jell in 1988, though they went through a period of woodshedding that lasted for nearly two years, and during this time the lineup was constantly changing. They did not play out until 1990, on a date opening for Pussy Galore which included future member Bob Bert. With Aaron finally established as singer, the group first recorded in 1991 for an Atavistic Records compilation, Out of Their Mouths and Into Your Head. The Chrome Cranks subsequently took a brief hiatus as Weber moved to New York City later that year; during a return visit, however, Weber rejoined the band to record its first single. Despite that Weber subsequently joined GG Allin and the Murder Junkies, Aaron also moved to New York City in 1992 and re-established The Chrome Cranks, adding former Honeymoon Killers guitarist Jerry Teel on bass. They signed with PCP Entertainment, a label distributed by Matador Records. After moving through a succession of drummers, including Charles Hanson; former lead guitarist, singer/co-songwriter for seminal New Orleans punk band “The Normals”, founder & co-songwriter for Mercury/Polygram artists “The Vels”, & bassist for Amphetamine Reptile artist “Loudspeaker”, & designer & builder of Fun House Studios, who played drums on all but one track on their debut album & recently remastered ”Chrome Cranks” & all tracks on 7” “Vice Squad Dick”, Bob Bert joined The Chrome Cranks in the summer of 1994. He first appeared on The Chrome Cranks' second album, Dead Cool, released on Crypt Records.

After releasing Vice Squad Dick—a PCP Entertainment EP shared with J. G. Thirlwell—The Chrome Cranks eponymous first album made its debut in November 1994 and was warmly received by the underground music press. Jerry Teel remodeled The Chrome Cranks' modest rehearsal space into a fully functioning recording facility—Funhouse Studio—where most of their subsequent recordings were made and they recorded other acts as well. In 1996, The Chrome Cranks once again toured Europe on the strength of an EP, Lost Time Blues, again issued by PCP Entertainment. The next studio album, Love in Exile, featured the song "Hot Blonde Cocktail" which went into rotation on MTV and occasioned another six-week round of touring in Europe, during which Live in Exile (Konkurrent) was recorded during a date in the Netherlands. Atavistic Records subsequently issued a package of early demos as Oily Cranks, and The Chrome Cranks did a Canadian/North American tour in support to Geraldine Fibbers. But by this time The Chrome Cranks were getting worn out with the constant pressure of touring, and after a final European tour in 1998 the group went on an indefinite hiatus.

All of the groups' members went into other projects, save Aaron, who went into music journalism; he currently edits a magazine, Chronogram. Teel ultimately moved to New Orleans, and though his home was destroyed by Hurricane Katrina, has since settled there permanently. After two tours with the Candy Snatchers, Weber returned to Cincinnati where he established his own recording facility, Krakdhaus Studio, and played with local groups while still appearing, on occasion, with the now GG Allin-less Murder Junkies. Aaron participated in a studio project, Avondale Airforce, with Venture Lift's Stanton Warren.

The Chrome Cranks enjoyed a revival of interest when, in 2007, Atavistic Records released Diabolical Boogie, a compilation prepared from rare, live and unreleased material. After a series of well-received reunion gigs in New York City in May 2009, the group played the Nuits Sonore festival in Lyon, France. The success of further New York engagements convinced the band to make a new studio album, Ain't No Lies in Blood, which was released on Thick Syrup Records (CD) and Bang! Records in Spain in 2012. Reviews were exceedingly positive, with some writers proclaiming Ain't No Lies in Blood a better effort than any of The Chrome Cranks' 1990s recordings. In early 2013 Bang! also released Moon in the Mountain, a long EP which combined new material with a session recorded in the UK in 1995. This has led to a new European tour for the formerly "defunct" band, that took place in August and September 2013.

== Style and influence ==
The Chrome Cranks are renowned for their raw, dark, and fiery live performances, and they were regarded as one of the leading acts in the 1990s punk blues movement in New York City. The Chrome Cranks’ singular brand of dark, unhinged punk blues has been cited as a key influence by a growing number of younger acts, such as The White Stripes and Cat Power. Covers of songs by The Chrome Cranks as done by other bands are relatively commonplace, and several are being assembled into a tribute album tentatively entitled Collision Blues.

== Discography ==
- 1994 Vice Squad Dick CD EP/7" (PCP Entertainment, US) split with Foetus (two songs by each act on CD; seven-inch picture disc features each act performing the title track, a cover of a 1979 song by Dick Uranus)
- 1994 The Chrome Cranks LP/CD (PCP Entertainment, US) Studio album
- 1995 Dead Cool LP/CD (Crypt Records, US/Germany) Studio album
- 1997 Oily Cranks LP/CD (Atavistic Worldwide, US) Early recordings
- 1997 Lost Time Blues CD EP/7" (PCP Entertainment, US) Studio recordings (four songs on CD; two songs on 7")
- 1997 Love in Exile LP/CD (PCP Entertainment, US; plus CD only on Konkurrent Records, Netherlands) Studio album
- 1998 Live in Exile 2xLP/CD (Au Go Go Records, Australia) CD (Konkurrent Records, Netherlands) Live album
- 2007 Diabolical Boogie 2xCD (Atavistic Worldwide, US) Compilation album containing singles, demos, and rarities, 1992-1998
- 2009 The Murder of Time (1993-1996) 2xLP/CD (Bang! Records, Spain) Career highlights
- 2012 Ain't No Lies in Blood CD (Thick Syrup Records, US) LP (Bang! Records, Spain) Studio album
- 2012 Moon in the Mountain CD EP (Thick Syrup Records, US) Studio track + 1995 UK radio session (originally offered as Kickstarter campaign premium)
- 2013 Moon in the Mountain EP (Bang! Records, Spain) Studio track + 1995 UK radio session

== See also ==
- William Gilmore Weber III
- Bob Bert
