= Windward Passages (Black Saint) =

Studio album by Dave Burrell
- Released: December 3, 1993
- Recorded: 1993
- Genre: Jazz, avant-garde, post-bop
- Length: 69:02
- Label: Black Saint
- Producer: Giovanni Bonandrini

David Murray chronology
Shakill's II (1993)	Windward Passages (1993)	David Murray Quintet (1994)

Dave Burrell chronology
The Jelly Roll Joys (1991)	Windward Passages (Black Saint) (1993)	Brother to Brother (1993)

Windward Passages is a studio album released by jazz pianist Dave Burrell and saxophonist David Murray. It was recorded in 1993 and released later that year on December 3 on the Italian Black Saint label. The album is an update/sequel to Burrell's album Windward Passages (1979) on hatART.

The album also features Burrell's wife, Monika Larsson, on the track "Cela Me Va" performing a spoken word reading. However, Murray's playing "ends up drowning her out to an extent."

== Track listing ==
1. "Sorrow Song (For W.E.B. Dubois)" (Murray) – 8:29
2. "It Hurts So Much to See" (Larsson) – 8:00
3. "Naima [Take 2]" (Coltrane) – 11:33
4. "Cela Me Va" (Larsson) – 5:26
5. "The Crave" (Morton) – 6:04
6. "Zanzibar Blue" (Burrell) – 9:22
7. "Conversation With Our Mothers" (Murray) – 6:09
8. "Naima [Take 1]" (Coltrane) – 13:59

== Personnel ==
- Dave Burrell – piano
- David Murray – clarinet (bass), saxophone (tenor)
- Giovanni Bonandrini – producer
- Maria Bonandrini, Max Martino – artwork
- Aldo Borrelli, Paolo Falascone – engineers
- Monika Larsson – vocals on "Cela Me Va"

== Reception ==
Professional ratings
Review scores
Source	Rating
AllMusic	4/5 stars
The Penguin Guide to Jazz Recordings	3.5/4 stars

Though AllMusic begins their review saying the album is "a bit unusual," they ultimately recommend it because it is "one of the better and more accessible recordings of both David Murray and Dave Burrell."
