= Three for Shepp =

Studio album by Marion Brown
- Released: 1967
- Recorded: December 1, 1966
- Studios: Van Gelder Studio, Englewood Cliffs, NJ
- Genre: Free jazz
- Length: 34:43
- Labels: Impulse! A-9139
- Producer: Bob Thiele

Marion Brown chronology
Juba-Lee (1967)	Three for Shepp (1967)	Porto Novo (1967)

Three for Shepp is an album by American saxophonist Marion Brown featuring performances recorded in 1966 for the Impulse! label.

== Reception ==
Professional ratings
Review scores
Source	Rating
Allmusic	4.5/5 stars
DownBeat	4/5 stars
The Penguin Guide to Jazz Recordings	3.5/4 stars

The Allmusic review by Thom Jurek awarded the album 4½ stars, stating: "Marion Brown's Three for Shepp is the image-in-the-mirror companion to Archie Shepp's Four for Trane recorded the year before. The program is equally divided between Brown's originals, which occupy the first half of the album, and Shepp tunes that take up the latter half. What is immediately striking is how similar in tone, color, and texture the two men were when it came to composition. Brown arms himself here with crack bands for these recordings... This is a classic Impulse! recording of the period by an overlooked master."

The authors of the Penguin Jazz Guide wrote: "Brown's Impulse! records are routinely overlooked... In the wake of this, his first successful record, Brown took to the road, playing tirelessly but curbing his studio activities. Impulse! had already released Shepp's Four For Trane. This was explicitly intended as a companion project and its arresting opening... establishes it as one of the most inventive in the label's distinguished catalogue... Brief as it is at just 35 minutes, Three For Shepp is so densely packed with musical information that it takes many, many listens to deconstruct: a living lesson in musical history, a passionate manifesto for the future."

A reviewer at SoundOhm included the album in the "Best of 2019" playlist, and stated: "Three For Shepp balances fiery energy and delicate precision... Even this early in his career, Brown stood apart from his peers in "the new thing." His solos were as gentle as they were furious. Informed by the African American folk traditions of his native Georgia and an enthusiastic embrace of the avant-garde, his music would confront and challenge society. As Brown says in the original liner notes, 'The music is definitely a part of what's going on in the black revolution in America.' Three For Shepp still sounds crucial today (over 50 years later) and remains a vital statement of jazz's past, present and future."

== Track listing ==
All compositions by Marion Brown except as noted

1. "New Blue" - 5:11
2. "Fortunato" - 8:54
3. "The Shadow Knows" - 3:04
4. "Spooks" (Archie Shepp) - 4:32
5. "West India" (Shepp) - 6:24
6. "Delicado" (Shepp) - 6:38

== Personnel ==
- Marion Brown - alto saxophone
- Grachan Moncur III - trombone
- Dave Burrell (tracks 1–3), Stanley Cowell (tracks 4–6) - piano
- Norris Jones - bass
- Bobby Capp (tracks 1–3), Beaver Harris (tracks 4–6) – drums
