= Maarten Altena =

Dutch composer and contrabassist (born 1943)

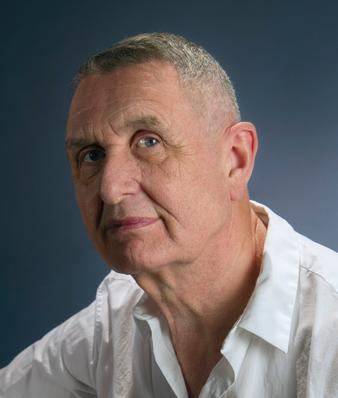

Background information
- Born: January 22, 1943 (age 82); Amsterdam, Netherlands
- Genres: Jazz, free improvisation, contemporary classical music
- Occupation(s): Musician, composer
- Instrument: Double bass
- Years active: 1960s–present
- Website: www.maartenaltena.nl

Maarten van Regteren Altena (born January 22, 1943) is a Dutch composer and contrabassist. Altena attended the Conservatorium van Amsterdam (he studied contrabass) and graduated in 1968. Between 1980 and 1985, he studied composition with Robert Heppener.

== Career ==
Son of the art historian Iohan Quirijn van Regteren Altena, Altena first recorded with Theo Loevendie, after which he had the opportunity to be part of Marion Brown's trio that recorded Porto Novo along with Han Bennink. After graduation, Altena played in a number of ensembles, such as various formations around Willem Breuker and Theo Loevendie. He also played in the Dutch Ballet Orchestra and other orchestras. In the mid-1970s he started performing solo, playing his own pieces, partly composed, partly improvised.

Altena also founded his own ensemble, the Maarten Altena Kwartet (Maarten Altena Quartet) which expanded into the Maarten Altena Ensemble (MAE) in 1980. From that point onwards, his career focused on composition. In 1997 he stopped being an active member of this ensemble, and he left it completely in 2005 in order to be able to spend more time composing for other ensembles.

== Compositions ==
- First Floor (1989) for the Netherlands Wind Ensemble
- Speaking (1990) for the Nieuwe Slagwerkgroep Amsterdam
- Pitch (1990) for the Mondriaan Kwartet
- Stave (1988) for tenor saxophonist Peter van Bergen
- Toonzucht (1991) for singer Jannie Pranger
- Puls (1993) for percussionist Johan Faber.
- Secret instructions (1992) for the Nederlands Studenten Orkest
- Code, (1992) of which Henk van der Meulen made a film for the NPS
- Zijdelings Afgesproken (1996) for the Maarten Altena Ensemble and Maatschappij Discordia
- Mijlpaal er trilt iets (1998), music theater based on a text by Remco Campert for Theatergroep Hollandia
- Een geestelijk verschiet / Horizon (1999)
- Eluard/Beckett (2000) for the Maarten Altena Ensemble
- Album (2001) for clarinetist David Kweksilber
- Mouthpiece II for the Netherlands Wind Ensemble
- La Dolce Ferita (Torquato Tasso) (2002) for the vocal Kassiopeia-kwintet and the Maarten Altena Ensemble
- Der tolle Mensch (Nietzsche) (2003) for the Netherlands Wind Ensemble
- arrangement of the Kindertotenlieder of Gustav Mahler for 15 instruments for the Netherlands Wind Ensemble
- Dans for the Maarten Altena Ensemble

== Prizes ==
In 1978 Altena received the Wessel Ilcken Prize for jazz and improvised music.
