= Anaïs St. John =

American singer

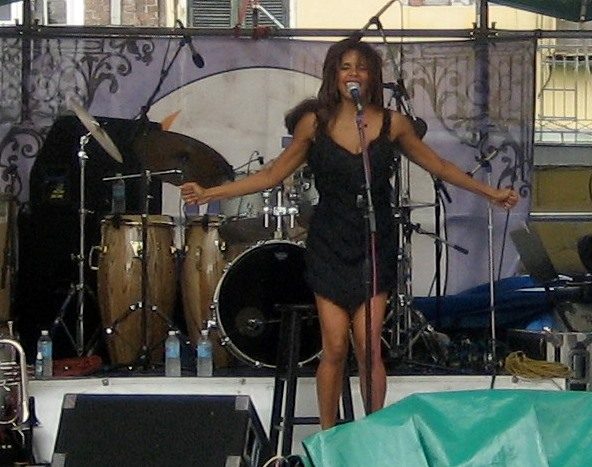
- St. John performing at the Satchmo Summer Fest in 2009

Background information
- Born: Anaïs Brown; 1973 (age 52–53); New Orleans, Louisiana, United States
- Genres: Jazz; blues
- Occupations: Musician, educator

Anaïs St. John (born 1973 in New Orleans as Anaïs Brown) is an American musician, musical educator, and dramatic performer from New Orleans. St. John has a bachelor's degree in Music from the Xavier University, and a master's degree from the University of New Orleans. She was originally a mezzo-soprano at the New Orleans Opera, but as a solo artist she has combined jazz, blues and R&B. Her music draws inspiration from artists like Irma Thomas, Germaine Bazzle, Eartha Kitt, and Lola Falana.

St. John has performed at a number of scenes, including the Tulane Summer Lyric Theater, Mid-City Theater, New Orleans Opera, Le Petit Theater, Le Chat Noir, and Jefferson Performing Arts Society. Further, she has staged at festivals including Jazz Fest, New Orleans Jazz and Heritage Festival, New Orleans French Quarter Fest, Umbria Winter Jazz Festival (Italy), and Jazz Ascona (Switzerland).

She released the album ANAÏS St. John in April 2012. Anaïs St. John is primarily a live artist through club performances, concerts, and shows. In 2014 she developed a tribute show to Donna Summer, and in early 2018 followed Simply the Best: The Tina Turner Story, a tribute performance on Tina Turner's life and music. In August 2018, Anaïs St. John developed the show Lulu White: Queen of Storyville staged at the Theatre Wego.

St. John is the daughter of jazz musician and saxophonist Marion Brown.

== Discography ==
- Anaïs St. John, 2012
