= The 360 Degree Music Experience =

American jazz band

The 360 Degree Music Experience was an American band that performed both traditional and experimental jazz. Active during the 1970s and 1980s, the group was initially co-led by drummer Beaver Harris and the pianist Dave Burrell. After Burrell left the group, pianist Don Pullen replaced him. Several other notable musicians were members of the band at one time or another, including Hamiet Bluiett, Cameron Brown, Ron Carter, Ricky Ford, Jimmy Garrison, Grachan Moncur III, Titos Sompa, and Buster Williams among others. The group released two albums for BMG: From Ragtime to No Time and A Well Kept Secret.

== Discography ==
- 1975: From Rag Time To No Time (360 Records)
- 1976: In: Sanity (Black Saint)
- 1979: Beautiful Africa (Soul Note)
- 1979: Safe (Red)
- 1981: Live At Nyon (Cadence)
- 1981: Negcaumongus (Cadence)
- 1984: A Well Kept Secret (Shemp)
