= Recital (Dave Burrell and Tyrone Brown album) =

Studio album by Dave Burrell and Tyrone Brown
- Released: 2001
- Recorded: August 8, 2000
- Genre: Jazz
- Length: 67:34
- Label: CIMP

Dave Burrell chronology
Brother to Brother (1993)	Recital (2001)	Expansion (2001)

Recital is a studio album released by jazz pianist Dave Burrell. It was recorded on August 8, 2000, and released in 2001 by the label CIMP. The album is a duet with bassist Tyrone Brown. The album is considered as "simple, yet stately".

== Track listing ==
1. "Never Let Me Go" (Livingston) — 8:50
2. "Struttin' With Some Barbeque" (Hardin) — 5:15
3. "Samba Rondo (Imagine the Dancers)" (Burrell) — 5:32
4. "You Go to My Head" (Gillespie) — 8:10
5. "Dear Mr. Roach" (Brown) — 5:47
6. "Shortin' Bread" () — 6:48
7. "With a Little Time" (Burrell) — 5:31
8. "Caravan" (Tizol) — 5:25
9. "Blue Moon" (Rodgers) — 3:23
10. "The Crave" (Morton) — 3:46
11. "Lost Waltz" (Burrell) — 3:41
12. "Giant Steps" (Coltrane) — 5:20

== Personnel ==
- Dave Burrell — piano
- Tyrone Brown — string bass

== Reception ==
Professional ratings
Review scores
Source	Rating
Allmusic	4/5 stars
PGJ	3.5/4 stars

The Penguin Guide to Jazz agrees with Allmusic reference above, calling the album a "simply recorded session." However, they call it "another very fine record from a consistently underrated player." This is likely because "[Burrell] performs with such immaculate precision infused with emotional depth that each piece is a joy to hear," comments AMG reviewer Steven Loewy.
