= After Love (album) =

Studio album by Dave Burrell
- Released: 1971
- Recorded: 1970; Paris
- Genre: Jazz
- Length: 50:48
- Label: America
- Producer: Daniel Richard

Dave Burrell chronology
Echo (1969)	After Love (1971)	Only Me (1974)

CD Reissue Cover

Professional ratings
Review scores
Source	Rating
Allmusic	4.5/5 stars
The Penguin Guide to Jazz Recordings	3.5/4 stars

After Love is an album by jazz pianist Dave Burrell, which was recorded in 1970 and released on the French America label. It was reissued on CD in 2004 by Universal France. The two songs (on three tracks) were recorded during the "legendary Parisian sessions of 1969–1970". It was during this time period that such acts as the Art Ensemble of Chicago, Archie Shepp and others took up residence in Europe, specifically in Paris, France.

== Track listing ==
1. "After Love, Pt. 1 "Questions and Answers"" — 21:46
2. "After Love, Pt. 2 "Random"" — 7:06
3. "My March" — 22:03

Songs credited to Burrell.

== Personnel ==
Band:

- Dave Burrell — piano
- Bertrand Gauthier — drums
- Michel Gladieux — double bass
- Ron Miller — mandolin, double bass
- Roscoe Mitchell — reeds
- Don Moye — drums
- Alan Silva — violin, cello, Electric cello

Production:

- Martin Davies — English translations
- Alexis Frenkel — mastering, transfers
- Gilles Guerlet, Jérôme Witz — art direction, design, paintings
- Bruno Guermonprez — reissue preparation
- Horace, Christian Rose, Frederick L. Thomas — photography
- Robert Levin — liner notes
- Daniel Richard — reissue supervisor

== Reception ==
Allmusic comments that the album is "a compelling and provocative one." Reviewer Thom Jurek says that "what is immediately striking is the lack of the piano's sonic presence on the session" but that the Burrel is "everywhere ... going for something else ... [a] textural and harmonic interaction of the various stringed instruments as they encounter and dialogue with each other." The Penguin Guide to Jazz says that the album is similar to Burrell's earlier work of Echo “in that the first piece is fierce and intense, while the second majors on atmospherics." Still, they call the instrumentation fascinating and "this is a valuable reissue from an important period in the American improvisation diaspora."
