= Marion Brown =

American saxophonist (1931–2010)

Background information
- Born: September 8, 1931; Atlanta, Georgia, United States
- Died: October 18, 2010 (aged 79) Hollywood, Florida, United States
- Genres: Avant-garde, jazz
- Occupations: Musician, ethnomusicologist
- Instrument: Alto saxophone
- Years active: 1962–1993

Marion Brown (September 8, 1931 – October 18, 2010) was an American jazz alto saxophonist, composer, writer, visual artist, and ethnomusicologist. He was a member of the avant-garde jazz scene in New York City during the 1960s, playing alongside musicians such as John Coltrane, Archie Shepp, and John Tchicai. He performed on Coltrane's landmark 1965 album Ascension. AllMusic reviewer Scott Yanow described him as "one of the brightest and most lyrical voices of the 1960s avant-garde."

== Biography ==
=== Early life ===
Brown was born in Atlanta in 1931 and was raised by a single mother. He was the grandson of an escaped slave from Georgia's Sea Islands. He began studying the saxophone at an early age, inspired by Charlie Parker. He left high school in the 10th grade and joined the army. During his three-year enlistment, he played alto saxophone, clarinet, and baritone saxophone, and was stationed in Hokkaido for some time.

In 1956, he returned to Atlanta and enrolled at Clark College, where he studied music, taking lessons from Wayman Carver. After graduating, he moved to Washington, DC, where he enrolled at Howard University's law school. During this time, he began listening to musicians such as John Coltrane, Ornette Coleman, and Archie Shepp, all of whom he would soon meet and come to know.

=== Early career ===
In 1962, Brown left Howard and moved to New York City, where he befriended a number of musicians, as well as writers such as Amiri Baraka (then known as LeRoi Jones), who was also a Howard drop-out, and A. B. Spellman, a Howard graduate. According to Brown, "The writers who listened to me and liked my playing, they inspired me to be better, and I inspired them to keep listening. LeRoi Jones opened the door for me; he introduced me to the world. He was a very beautiful and very smart person."

He also met Ornette Coleman and Archie Shepp, and introduced Shepp to Baraka. Brown recalled that Shepp "offered me the opportunity to play with him. But I didn't have a saxophone, so Ornette Coleman let me use his white plastic saxophone to get started."

According to writer Aldon Lynn Nielsen, Brown's "conversations with Baraka and Shepp aided them in their thinking through of the relationships between the American jazz avant-garde and African musical traditions." Brown later played a minor acting role in the original production of Baraka's Dutchman.

In 1964, Brown performed with Shepp and Bill Dixon in "Four Days in December", a series sponsored by the Jazz Composers Guild. The following year, he participated in the recording of Shepp's Fire Music as well as John Coltrane's Ascension. According to Brown, he was introduced to Coltrane by Shepp: "Archie told him about my music and he started to listen to it and he liked it. And then, several times, he would come to hear me play and he liked that. So when he decided to do Ascension, I fit the picture of somebody that he wanted in it."

Regarding the music on Ascension, Brown stated: "You could use this record to heat up your apartment on a cold morning." Regarding the recording session, he recalled: "We did two takes, and they both had that kind of thing in them that makes people scream. The people who were in the studio were screaming. I don't know how the engineers kept the screams out of the record. Spontaneity was the thing. Trane had obviously thought a lot about what he wanted to do, but he wrote most of it out in the studio. Then he told everybody what he wanted: he played this line and he said that everybody would play that line in the ensembles. Then he said he wanted crescendi until we were together, and then we got into it."

During the mid-1960s, Brown began recording under his own name: Marion Brown Quartet, recorded in 1965 and released on ESP the following year; Why Not?, recorded in 1966 and released on ESP in 1968; Juba-Lee, recorded in 1966 and released on Fontana in 1967; and Three for Shepp, recorded and released in 1966 on Impulse!. Coltrane had used his influence at Impulse! to secure Brown his own recording date with the label. Brown also performed with Sun Ra and Pharoah Sanders, and recorded with Burton Greene on the album Burton Greene Quartet.

=== In Europe ===
In 1967, Brown moved to Europe, where he continued performing and recording, and where he developed an interest in architecture, Impressionistic art, African music and the music of Erik Satie. He was an American Fellow in Music Composition and Performance at the Cité internationale des arts in Paris. On a show on French television, he played a version of Sound Structure with drummer Eddy Gaumont. Late that year, while in Holland, he recorded Porto Novo with Han Bennink and Maarten Altena.

While in Europe, Brown met and befriended Gunter Hampel, and in 1968 they recorded the soundtrack for Marcel Camus' film Le temps fou, with a band featuring Steve McCall, Barre Phillips, and Ambrose Jackson. Brown and Hampel recorded two more albums, Gesprächsfetzen (in 1968) and Marion Brown In Sommerhausen (in 1969). While in Europe, Brown also performed in duos with Leo Smith, recording Creative Improvisation Ensemble.

=== Return to U.S. ===
In 1970, Brown returned to the United States, settling in Connecticut, where he at first worked in elementary schools, "teaching children how to make instruments and create their own music," and where he continued his musical partnership with Leo Smith. He composed and performed incidental music for a Georg Büchner play, Woyzeck.

From 1971 to 1976, he taught at Bowdoin College, Brandeis University, Colby College, and Amherst College, and in 1976 he earned a master's degree in ethnomusicology from Wesleyan University. His master's thesis was entitled "Faces and Places: The Music and Travels of a Contemporary Jazz Musician". During this time, he also studied South Indian flute with P. Vishwanathan.

In the early 1970s, Brown also recorded a trilogy of albums influenced by poet Jean Toomer, reflecting on his southern upbringing, in which "images of the Georgia countryside, many of them drawn from Toomer's poetry, and improvisational techniques of African, AfroAmerican, and European provenance enrich and revivify one another:", ECM), Geechee Recollections (1973, Impulse!), which featured Leo Smith and Steve McCall among others; Sweet Earth Flying (1974, Impulse!, named after a line in a Toomer poem), which featured Muhal Richard Abrams and Steve McCall among others and November Cotton Flower ( 1979 Baystate Japan ) with Hilton Ruiz.

Reviewer Robert Palmer wrote: "The trilogy as a whole is an exemplary demonstration of how... a thoughtful artist can explore a 'subject' through a variety of techniques, processes, and formal disciplines. The shifting of perspective and approach from work to work is reminiscent of Durrell's Alexandria Quartet and indeed Brown's examination of the emotional, intellectual, and aesthetic ramifications of his origins is the sort of thing one finds frequently in literature and rarely in improvisional music.

During the 1970s, Brown also recorded with Archie Shepp (Attica Blues, 1972 and Attica Blues Big Band Live At The Palais Des Glaces, 1979), Leo Smith (Duets, 1973), Elliott Schwartz (Duets and Soundways, both 1973), Stanley Cowell (Regeneration, 1975), Harold Budd (The Pavilion of Dreams, 1976), and Grachan Moncur III (Shadows, 1977). He also released ten albums under his own name.

In 1972 and 1976, Brown received grants from the National Endowment for the Arts, which he used to compose and publish several pieces for solo piano, one of which was based on poetry from Jean Toomer's book Cane. He also transcribed some piano and organ music by Erik Satie including his Messe des pauvres and Pages mysterieuses, and arranged the composer's Le Fils des étoiles for two guitars and violin.

In the 1980s, Brown continued recording, and also began focusing on drawing and painting, exhibiting his artwork at a number of shows. His charcoal portrait of blues guitarist Blind Lemon Jefferson was included in an art show called Jus' Jass at Kenkeleba Gallery in New York City, which also included works by artists such as Romare Bearden, Charles Searles and Joe Overstreet. In 1984, he published an autobiography titled "Recollections". In the 1990s, he occasionally performed and read his poetry at Studio 5C in New York.

=== Final years ===
By the late 1990s, Brown had fallen ill; due to a series of surgeries and a partial leg amputation, Brown resided for a time in the Bethany Methodist Home, Brooklyn. He spent his final years in an assisted living facility in Hollywood, Florida, where he died in 2010, aged 79.

He is survived by his son Djinji Brown and his two daughters, Anais St. John and Paloma Soria Brown.

In September 2010, Deval Patrick, then governor of Massachusetts, issued a proclamation naming September 15 "Marion Brown Day."

== Influence ==
Pianist Amina Claudine Myers' debut album Poems for Piano: The Piano Music of Marion Brown (Sweet Earth, 1979) predominantly featured Brown's compositions.

Aside from his influence in the jazz avant-garde, several other areas of music have taken interest in Brown's music. Brown's collaborator Harold Budd recorded Brown's piece “Sweet Earth Flying” (1974) on his album Luxa in 1996. Indie rockers Superchunk included a song called "Song for Marion Brown" on their album Indoor Living, and Savath and Savalas released a piece entitled "Two Blues for Marion Brown" as part of Hefty Records's Immediate Action series.

His Name Is Alive performed a tribute concert in 2004, performing solely Brown's music. In 2007, High Two released portions of the concert with studio versions as Sweet Earth Flower: A Tribute to Marion Brown.

Brown's piece "Sweet Earth Flying, Pt. 1" (1974) was sampled by Onyx on their track "Walk in New York" (1995), while his piece "Karintha" (1973) was sampled by Four Tet in "Alambradas" (1999). Hip hop and electronic producer and DJ RJD2 sampled Brown's piece "Who Knows" (1968) on his track "Smoke & Mirrors" (2002).

== Thoughts on music ==
"It is wrong to say that free jazz does not swing. It swings to a high number of beats. It is polyrhythmic. But it is hard for people listening to it to realize that... Free jazz is closer to African beats than bop or swing were; African rhythm is very complex."

"My reference is the blues, and that's where my music comes from. I do listen to music of other cultures, but I just find them interesting. I don't have to borrow from them. My music and my past are rich enough. B.B. King is my Ravi Shankar."

== Discography ==
=== As leader/co-leader ===
- 1965: Marion Brown Quartet (ESP-Disk/Fontana, 1966)
- 1966: Juba-Lee (Fontana, 1967)
- 1966: Three for Shepp (Impulse!, 1967)
- 1966: Why Not? (ESP-Disk, 1968)
- 1967: Porto Novo (Arista, 1967)
- 1968: Gesprächsfetzen with Gunter Hampel (Calig, 1968)
- 1968: Le Temps Fou with Gunter Hampel, Ambrose Jackson, Steve McCall, and Barre Phillips (Polydor, 1969)
- 1969: In Sommerhausen with Gunter Hampel and Jeanne Lee (Calig, 1969)
- 1970: Afternoon of a Georgia Faun (ECM, 1970)
- 1973: Soundways with Elliott Schwartz (Bowdoin College Music Press)
- 1973: Geechee Recollections (Impulse!)
- 1974: Sweet Earth Flying (Impulse!)
- 1975: Creative Improvisation Ensemble with Leo Smith (Freedom)
- 1975: Duets with Leo Smith and Elliott Schwartz (Freedom)
- 1975: Vista (Impulse!)
- 1976: Awofofora (Discomate)
- 1977: Wildflowers 2 (The New York Loft Jazz Sessions) (Douglas / Casablanca); Brown appears on one track; reissued in 1999 by Knit Classics on Wildflowers: The New York Loft Jazz Sessions – Complete
- 1977: Zenzile Featuring Marion Brown (Baystate)
- 1977: La Placita / Live in Willisau (Timeless Muse)
- 1977: Solo Saxophone (Sweet Earth)
- 1978: Reeds 'n Vibes with Gunter Hampel (Improvising Artists)
- 1978: Passion Flower (Baystate)
- 1979: Soul Eyes (Baystate)
- 1979: November Cotton Flower (Baystate)
- 1979: 79118 Live (DIW)
- 1980: Back to Paris (Freelance)
- 1982: Solo Saxophone (Yale University, 1981) (Other Ear)
- 1983: Gemini (Birth)
- 1985: Recollections (Creative Works)
- 1986: Songs of Love and Regret with Mal Waldron (Freelance)
- 1988: Much More with Mal Waldron (Freelance)
- 1993: Offering (Venus)
- 1993: Gemini + play Sun Ra "live" in concert with Gunter Hampel (Birth)
- 1993: Mirante Do Vale ~ Offering II (Venus)
- 2000: Echoes Of Blue (Double Moon)
- 2016: Five Improvisations (B.Free)
- 2018: Live at the Black Musicians' Conference, 1981 with Dave Burrell (NoBusiness)
- 2019: Capricorn Moon to Juba Lee Revisited (ezz-thetics)
- 2020: Why Not? Porto Novo! Revisited (ezz-thetics)

=== As sideman ===
With Harold Budd

- The Pavilion of Dreams (Editions EG, 1976)
- Luxa (All Saints, 1996)

With Archie Shepp

- Fire Music (Impulse!, 1965)
- The New Wave in Jazz (Impulse!, 1965) – one track
- Attica Blues (Impulse!, 1972)
- Attica Blues Big Band Live at the Palais des Glaces (Blue Marge, 1993)

With others

- John Coltrane, Ascension (Impulse!, 1965)
- Stanley Cowell, Regeneration (Strata-East, 1976)
- Burton Greene, Burton Greene Quartet (ESP Disk, 1966)
- The Group, Live (NoBusiness, 2012) – (Ahmed Abdullah, Brown, Billy Bang, Sirone, Fred Hopkins, Andrew Cyrille)
- The Gunter Hampel All Stars, Jubilation (Birth, 1983)
- Grachan Moncur III, Shadows (Denon, 1977)

== Filmography ==
- You See What I'm Trying To Say? (Henry English, 1967)
- See The Music (Inside The Creative Improvisation Ensemble) (Theodor Kotulla, 1971)
- Jazz Is Our Religion (John Jeremy, 1972)
- Inside Out In The Open (Alan Roth, 2001)
- Meditations on Revolution V: Foreign City (Robert Fenz, 2003)
