= Brother to Brother (Dave Burrell and David Murray album) =

Studio album by Dave Burrell and David Murray
- Released: 1993
- Recorded: 1993
- Genre: Post bop, free jazz, avant-garde jazz
- Label: Gazell Records
- Producer: Samuel Charters

Dave Burrell chronology
Windward Passages (Black Saint) (1993)	Brother to Brother (1993)	Recital (2001)

Brother to Brother is a studio album released by jazz pianist Dave Burrell. It was recorded in 1993 and released later that year. The album once again features Burrell collaborator David Murray and a parallel release with Windward Passages (Black Saint). This album was released by Gazell Records. The album is considered "an excellent effort."

== Track listing ==
1. "The Box" (Burrell) — 7:08
2. "Icarus" (Murray) — 8:52
3. "Dancing With Monika" (Burrell) — 6:48
4. "New Orleans Blues" (Morton) — 5:11
5. "Brother to Brother" (Larsson) — 7:28
6. "What It Means to a Woman" (Larsson) — 10:59

== Personnel ==
- Dave Burrell — piano
- David Murray — clarinet (bass), saxophone (tenor)
- Samuel Charters — producer
- Nora Charters — photography
- Glenn Barratt — engineers
- Brian Trainor — technician

== Reception ==
Professional ratings
Review scores
Source	Rating
Allmusic	4/5 stars

Reviewer Scott Yanow of Allmusic notes that this album is "mostly quite relaxed, surprisingly melodic in spots, and explorative but in subtle ways," almost another side of the coin to the simultaneous release "Windward Passages (Black Saint)".
