= Juba-Lee =

Studio album by Marion Brown
- Released: 1967
- Recorded: November 1966
- Label: Fontana Records

Marion Brown chronology
Marion Brown Quartet (1966)	Juba-Lee (1967)	Three for Shepp (1967)

Juba-Lee is an album by American saxophonist Marion Brown. It was recorded in November 1966 in New York City, and was released in 1967 on the Fontana label. The album features Brown on alto saxophone, Bennie Maupin on tenor saxophone, Alan Shorter on trumpet and flugelhorn, Grachan Moncur III on trombone, Dave Burrell on piano, Reggie Johnson on bass, and Beaver Harris on drums. The album was recorded roughly a month prior to Brown's Impulse! debut, Three for Shepp. The tracks "Juba-Lee" and "Iditus" also appear on the 2019 ezz-thetics (Hat Hut) album Capricorn Moon To Juba Lee Revisited.

The tune "Juba Lee" is featured on the 2007 Marion Brown tribute album Sweet Earth Flower by the band His Name Is Alive.

== Reception ==
Professional ratings
Review scores
Source	Rating
AllMusic	4.5/5 stars
DownBeat	4.5/5 stars

In a review for AllMusic, Brandon Burke wrote: "It should go without saying that any free jazz session featuring either Shorter or Moncur is going to be heavy. Both men, as soloists and as composers, tend to dramatically alter any recording upon which they appear... Unfortunately, this would be the only session upon which the two appeared together, making the historical relevance of this date even more pronounced... Highly recommended."

Regarding Shorter's "Iditus", David Grundy, in an article for Point of Departure, stated: "The piece is constructed not so much on one chord as on one note, relentlessly restated by Burrell and bassist Reggie Johnson, and seeming to half-lope, half-march, half-creep through endless shadows. Shorter is the first to solo... Exploiting the instrument's timbral ambiguity, it's not immediately clear which horn has entered: as his solo continues, Shorter, like Moncur, exploits the particular effect of straining within those lower registers, so that those notes become pinched. Phrases trail away into a breathy, upper register, or into silence: a question half-asked, an answer cut off, half-way through the telling. Rather than the well-rounded statement, the operative principle is that of the fragment, of sound in a constant dialogue with silence, which is both void (silencing) and potential."

Writing for Jazz Right Now, Christopher Forbes commented: "'Juba Lee' has moments that sound like the late Ayler groups at the Village Vanguard, full of sounds from early New Orleans brass bands and primitive baptist singing. Monchur contributes a fine solo that ranges from the main key to all sorts of subsidiary keys and emotions. Shorter's 'Iditus'... has an ominous air which explodes into outright menace as the solos progress. Shorter in particular does a marvelous gradual build in his solo."

In an article regarding the 2019 reissue, John Litweiler called the recording "historically important", and praised Shorter's playing on "Iditus", writing: "Again and again, his solos escape from the rhythmic tyranny of tempo and meter and one-chord (not harmonically free) settings. He likes longer note values and middle octaves, and, when he plays flugelhorn, it sounds like it was invented specifically for him... The mounting tensions of Shorter's solos contrast with Brown, who bursts with high spirits. His melodies undergo constant reinvention. Even more than Shorter, the altoist takes rhythmic freedoms that are an advance on Ornette-Cherry."

== Track listing ==
Tracks 1–3 by Marion Brown. Track 4 by Alan Shorter.

1. "512e12" – 15:37
2. "The Visitor" – 9:13
3. "Juba-Lee" – 12:31
4. "Iditus" – 12:15

Recorded November 1966 in New York City.

== Personnel ==
- Marion Brown – alto saxophone
- Bennie Maupin – tenor saxophone
- Alan Shorter – trumpet and flugelhorn
- Grachan Moncur III – trombone
- Dave Burrell – piano
- Reggie Johnson – bass
- Beaver Harris – drums
