= Von LMO =

American singer-songwriter

VON LMO
- Born: Frank Anthony Cavallo; March 10, 1951 (age 75)
- Origin: Brooklyn, New York, U.S.
- Genres: Post-punk, space rock, no wave
- Instruments: Vocals, guitar, keyboard, drums, programming
- Years active: 1974–present
- Label: Varient Records
- Formerly of: Avant Duel, Red Transistor

Von LMO (born Frankie Cavallo; March 10, 1951) is an American singer, songwriter and guitarist.

== History ==
Cavallo has made various claims about his life and origins. At times, he has claimed to have been born in 1924 to Sicilian parents living in Brooklyn, at other times he has said that he is an extraterrestrial from the planet Strazar. Cavallo has cited Bill Haley & His Comets and Jerry Lee Lewis as being particularly inspirational for his music.

In 1982, Cavallo moved to Long Island and married a woman with two children. In 1984, this marriage produced a son for Cavallo. Cavallo tried to live a simple home life on Long Island (which he referred to as "The Sticks"), but was haunted by the demons of his past, including his heroin addiction. His continued drug use and violent past, including growing up with a violent and abusive father, caused him to violently physically and emotionally abuse this family for 10 years, before divorcing and returning to New York City.

In the 1990s, Cavallo collaborated with the San Francisco Bay Area bands Monoshock and OATS. Both were very short-lived.

In 2007, Cavallo was convicted of second-degree robbery, and sentenced to three and a half years. He was released from prison in 2010 and began performing with former collaborator Otto von Ruggins in Avant Duel, a space rock outfit based in Brooklyn, New York. Avant Duel debuted with Beyond Human on March 10, 2012, marking Cavallo's first studio release in over fifteen years.

== Influence ==
In 1994, Foetus released a cover of Cavallo's song "Outside of Time" on the single Vice Squad Dick.

Julian Cope is a notable admirer of Cavallo's music, which he has called a work of genius. He has written a rave review of the album Red Resistor on his website.

Suicide front-man Alan Vega described his admiration of Cavallo, writing "Red Transistor... Von LMO sang and played guitar and Rudolph Grey was on guitar or bass and it was total insanity. Von LMO was a nut, a great nut. I was afraid to be in the same room as him. One night they played at Max's and everyone was too afraid to sit up front as they smashed guitars and things were flying all over the place. I went into the front room in fear of my life and tried to get everyone to come with me. Nobody came with me because it was such an intense show."

== Legacy ==
Cavallo is the subject of a 2018 documentary by Lori Felker, FUTURE LANGUAGE: The Dimensions of Von LMO. The film explores LMO's life and artistry, as well as Felker's own challenges in capturing his bizarre stories and theories over a seven-year production.

== Discography ==
Solo

- Future Language (1981, Strazar)
- Cosmic Interception (1994, Variant)
- Red Resistor (1996, Variant)

with Red Transistor

- Not Bite/We're Not Crazy (1990, Ecstatic Peace!)

with Avant Duel

- Beyond Human (2012, Avant Duel)
