= Future Language =

Album by Von LMO

Studio album by Von LMO
- Released: 1981
- Genre: No wave
- Length: 37:47 (vinyl edition); 46:22 (CD edition)
- Label: StraZar (original release); Flemish Masters (reissue)

Von LMO chronology
| Future Language (1981) | Cosmic Interception (1994) |

Future Language is the debut studio album of Von LMO, released independently in 1981 through his label StraZar. It is dedicated to the advancement of the United States space program. After a performance at Max's Kansas City in November, Von LMO disappeared from the music scene until 1991.

== Songs ==
The song "Leave Your Body" was written in 1979 for an acquaintance of LMO's who had intended to commit suicide. VMO explained, "I tried to help her by telling her that she's going to leave her body, get out of that present state, and just find herself." Five of the album's tracks were previously recorded in 1979 at Skyline Studios, with those sessions appearing on Von LMO's 1994 album Cosmic Interception.

== Release and reception ==
Music journalist Chuck Eddy named Future Language as being one of the 500 best albums of heavy metal in his Stairway to Hell book, listing it at No. 347. He would later praise Saturn's saxophone playing and LMO's ability as a front-man in an issue of Spin.

In 2000, it was issued by Flemish Masters on CD and included the track "Shake, Rattle and Roll" as bonus content. The album was included in its entirety on the Tranceformer (Future Language 2.001) compilation released in 2003.

== Track listing ==
All tracks are written by Von LMO.

Side one
| No. | Title | Length |
|---|---|---|
| 1. | "Future Language" | 4:21 |
| 2. | "Crash Landing 88" | 3:48 |
| 3. | "Outside of Time" | 2:48 |
| 4. | "This Is Pop Rock" | 2:47 |
| 5. | "Leave Your Body" | 5:06 |

Side two
| No. | Title | Length |
|---|---|---|
| 1. | "Ultra Violet Light" | 4:29 |
| 2. | "Give Us Strength" | 2:28 |
| 3. | "Fire Eyes" | 2:59 |
| 4. | "Radio World" | 4:40 |
| 5. | "Be Yourself" | 4:16 |

2000 CD bonus track
| No. | Title | Length |
|---|---|---|
| 11. | "Shake, Rattle and Roll" | 8:34 |

== Personnel ==
Adapted from the Future Language liner notes.

Von LMO

- Mike Gee – electric guitar
- Von LMO – lead vocals, electric guitar
- George Matthewson – bass guitar
- Bobby Ryan – drums
- Juno Saturn – saxophone, backing vocals

Production and additional personnel

- Howie Weinberg – mastering

== Release history ==
| Region | Date | Label | Format | Catalog |
|---|---|---|---|---|
| United States | 1981 | StraZar | LP | 88-Z |
| United States | 2000 | Flemish Masters | CD | fm001 |
