= Amulet Records =

American record label

Amulet Records is a record label based in New Jersey specializing in percussion, avant-garde, and experimental music. The label was established by the percussionist composer and visual artist Billy Martin in 1995, inspired by a percussion session with the Lounge Lizards drummers Grant Calvin Weston and Billy Martin who released their first duet record Percussion Duets in 1997.

The catalogue features titles ranging from percussion repertoire produced by Martin; the Mozown series, dedicated to preserving vintage Bob Moses recordings; hip-hop and remix projects; a Sound Healing series and other visionary music and art.

== See also ==
- Avant-garde jazz
- Experimental pop
- Experimental rock
- Lists of record labels
