= Marie van Regteren Altena =

Dutch painter (1868–1958)

- Born: 28 December 1868; Amsterdam, Netherlands
- Died: 6 July 1958 (aged 89); Amsterdam, Netherlands
- Other name: Maria Engelina van Regteren Altena
- Known for: Painting

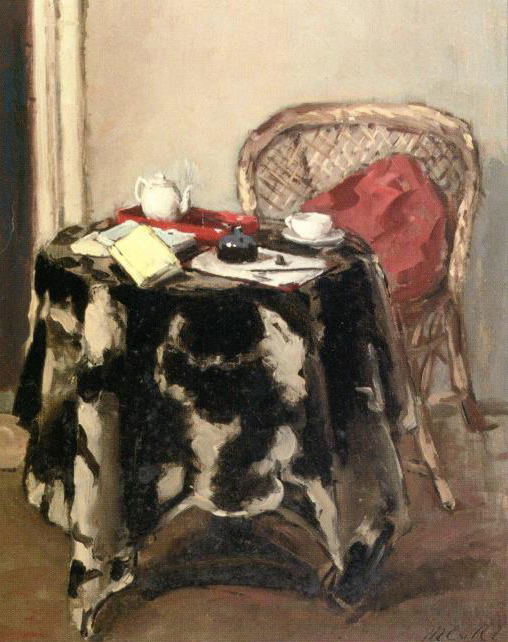
Theetijd

Marie van Regteren Altena (1868–1958) was a Dutch painter known for her still lifes.

== Biography ==
Altena was born on 28 December 1868 in Amsterdam. She studied at the Rijksakademie van beeldende kunsten (State Academy of Fine Arts). She studied with Geo Poggenbeek and Gerard Overman. She was a member of the Amsterdamse Joffers. She was also a member of the Vereeniging Sint Lucas Amsterdam (Amsterdam Artists Association of Sint Lucas) and the Arti et Amicitiae artist's society. Altena was influenced by the work of the French painters Jean-Baptiste-Siméon Chardin, Paul Cézanne, Edgar Degas, and Édouard Manet.

Altena's work was included in the 1939 exhibition and sale Onze Kunst van Heden (Our Art of Today) at the Rijksmuseum in Amsterdam.

Her work is in the collection of the Rijksmuseum and the Stedelijk Museum Amsterdam.

Altena died on 6 July 1958, in Amsterdam.
