= Ketchaoua (album) =

Studio album by Clifford Thornton
- Released: 1969
- Recorded: August 18, 1969
- Studio: Studio Saravah, Paris
- Genre: Free jazz
- Length: 40:20
- Label: Actuel; 529.323

Clifford Thornton chronology
Freedom & Unity (1969)	Ketchaoua (1969)	The Panther and the Lash (1971)

Ketchaoua is an album by multi-instrumentalist and composer Clifford Thornton. It was recorded in August 1969 at Studio Saravah in Paris, and was released by the Actuel label later that year. On the album, Thornton is heard on cornet, and is joined by saxophonists Arthur Jones and Archie Shepp, trombonist Grachan Moncur III, pianist Dave Burrell, bassists Beb Guérin and Earl Freeman, and drummers Sunny Murray and Claude Delcloo.

The album was recorded shortly after Thornton, as a member of Archie Shepp's group, visited Algiers and participated in the recording of Live at the Pan-African Festival, which featured Shepp's ensemble supplemented by several North African musicians. Ketchaoua is named after the district in Algiers where the musicians performed.

The recording took place as part of a marathon week-long BYG session during which Shepp also recorded Yasmina, a Black Woman, Poem for Malcolm, and Blasé, and which also yielded albums by artists such as Sunny Murray (Homage to Africa and Sunshine), the Art Ensemble Of Chicago (Message to Our Folks and Reese and the Smooth Ones), Grachan Moncur III (New Africa), Alan Silva (Luna Surface), Dave Burrell (Echo), Andrew Cyrille (What About?), and Jimmy Lyons (Other Afternoons).

The album was reissued by Ezz-Thetics, an imprint of Hat Hut Records, as part of the 2023 compilation Clifford Thornton Ketchaoua Revisited, paired with the 1971 Arthur Jones album Scorpio.

== Reception ==
Professional ratings
Review scores
Source	Rating
AllMusic	4.5/5 stars

In a review for AllMusic, Brandon Burke wrote: "This is some very free music and, save for a handful of scored passages, almost wholly improvised. A number of the scene's top players make appearances here in different groups... At times the ensemble pieces sound like a Pan-African Morton Feldman, and at others, hazy, psychedelic post bop. Fans of brooding and contemplative improvised music will find a great deal to enjoy here. In fact, many would argue that this is the best LP under Thornton's leadership."

Writing for Black World/Negro Digest, Ron Welburn stated: "this music is like the old jam sessions, and is at the same time a celebration of the festival, best conveyed on 'Pan African Festival' through Burrell's piano vamps and Murray's unmatched rhythmic freshness and chanting. With the bassist, the cornetist creates a tone poem mood for 'Speak With Your Echo (And Call This Dialogue)'".

== Track listing ==
All compositions by Clifford Thornton.

1. "Ketchaoua" – 12:35
2. "Pan African Festival" – 7:50
3. "Brotherhood" – 10:40
4. "Speak With Your Echo (And Call This Dialogue)" – 9:15

== Personnel ==
- Clifford Thornton – cornet, congas
- Archie Shepp – soprano saxophone (tracks 1 and 2)
- Arthur Jones – alto saxophone (tracks 1–3)
- Grachan Moncur III – trombone (tracks 1 and 2)
- Dave Burrell – piano, bells (tracks 1 and 2)
- Beb Guérin – bass
- Earl Freeman – congas, gong, percussion (track 1), bass (tracks 2–4)
- Sunny Murray – drums (tracks 1 and 2)
- Claude Delcloo – drums (track 3)
