= Luna Surface =

Studio album by Alan Silva and his Celestrial Communication Orchestra
- Released: 1969
- Recorded: August 17, 1969
- Genre: Jazz
- Length: 28:20
- Label: BYG Records
- Producer: Jean Georgakarakos, Jean-Luc Young

Alan Silva chronology
Skillfulness (1969)	Luna Surface (1969)	Seasons (1971)

Luna Surface is an album by multi-instrumentalist Alan Silva, recorded on August 17, 1969 and released later that year on the BYG label as part of their Actuel series. His first recording as leader, it features Silva on violin along with a large ensemble known as the Celestrial Communication Orchestra.

The album was recorded as part of a marathon week-long BYG session which also produced albums by artists such as Archie Shepp (Yasmina, a Black Woman, Poem for Malcolm, and Blasé), the Art Ensemble Of Chicago (Message to Our Folks and Reese and the Smooth Ones), Grachan Moncur III (New Africa), Jimmy Lyons (Other Afternoons), Dave Burrell (Echo), Andrew Cyrille (What About?), and Sunny Murray (Homage to Africa and Sunshine). In an interview, Silva commented:

If you look at it a certain way, it was one of the longest recording sessions in the history of the music... Every day for about a week there were rehearsal sessions, repetition sessions, recording sessions. Everybody had their own approach and their own compositions that they wanted you to play. My record during that time, Luna Surface, was my first attempt at conducting and letting everybody play through the conductions. The pool of resources everybody had at their disposal was quite phenomenal... And BYG captured that whole scene. They staged what I would call a coup d'etat, because no American label would ever touch this stuff."

When Silva was asked if the music of Iannis Xenakis was an influence on Luna Surface, he replied:

Xenakis is my main man. When it came to recording multiple levels like that, I felt modern written music had really advanced. Luna Surface... was based on a series of chords... There's no solo as such; it's all soloing, collective improvisation throughout... Luna Surface is my idea of landing on the moon. There's a second part in the BYG vaults somewhere that was never issued called "When We Landed".

== Reception ==
Professional ratings
Review scores
Source	Rating
AllMusic	3/5 stars
The Penguin Guide to Jazz Recordings	3/4 stars

In his AllMusic review, Brandon Burke awarded the album 3 stars, stating "this is a very free record that could easily turn off a listener not yet sold on the 1969 avant-garde jazz scene... There is very little in the way of a theme and arguably little or no direction to 'From the Luna Surface,' the only cut on the record. For some this might be a little too much to handle, while for others it might just hit the spot... As a historical document of Pan-African high art music, this session is absolutely invaluable. It might not be so appropriate in the car."

Dave Furgess commented: "This album really has hair on it" and noted that Silva "put together this mammoth ensemble with the intention of updating John Coltrane's Om and Ascension and Ornette Coleman's Free Jazz. After hearing Luna Surface I would have to say he was successful... These guys mean business, and sheer power of the playing of everyone involved is astounding. I haven't heard this many elephant honks since my fifth grade field trip to the Stamford Zoo. Holy Toledo!" He concluded: "This album can do crazy things to you."

Britt Robson, in an article for Red Bull Music Academy, wrote: "Silva says the strategy here is keyed off of Coltrane's Ascension in terms of collective improvisation, except that 'the solo is not an element in the piece: we are all going to play all the time'... It is a dizzying whirlwind that invites multiple ways to listen – sort the innards or ride the waves... it is brave, individualistic and made with the optimistic confidence that anything is possible."

Thurston Moore, in his "Top Ten From The Free Jazz Underground" list, first published in 1995 in the second issue of the defunct Grand Royal Magazine, praised Dave Burrell's album Echo, writing "from the first groove it sounds like an acoustic tidal wave exploding into shards of dynamite", then concluded: "If you can locate Alan Silva's Lunar Surface [sic] LP... you'll find a world even that much more OUT."

A review on the Tiliqua Records website states: "This one is a free jazz blast... it will wrap your ears around your head in pure delight... Luna Surface is an extreme sonic experiment and a weird hell broth of high-tension music triggering multiple high voltage reactions... Probably one of the all-time most arresting listening experiences of free jazz ever to be put down on wax, players act out as engaged in trench warfare, leaping into violent fits of madness and blowing out deep subterranean apocalyptic waves of sound that constantly hurtle in and out of focus. The overall outcome is a true head cleaner, uglier than any group of mutants you'd see at a bad insane asylum. This is the fast lane folks... and some of us like it here."

== Track listing ==
Composition by Alan Silva

1. "From The Luna Surface Part 1" - 14:10
2. "From The Luna Surface Part 2" - 14:10

- Recorded in Paris on August 17, 1969

== Personnel ==
- Alan Silva - violin
- Archie Shepp - soprano saxophone
- Anthony Braxton - soprano saxophone, alto saxophone
- Kenneth Terroade - tenor saxophone
- Bernard Vitet - trumpet, French horn
- Grachan Moncur III - trombone
- Leroy Jenkins - violin, viola
- Dave Burrell - piano
- Beb Guérin - bass
- Malachi Favors - bass
- Claude Delcloo - drums
