= Other Afternoons =

Studio album by Jimmy Lyons
- Released: 1970
- Recorded: August 15, 1969
- Genre: Jazz
- Length: 37:50
- Label: BYG Records
- Producer: Jean Georgakarakos, Jean-Luc Young

Jimmy Lyons chronology
| Other Afternoons (1970) | Push Pull (1979) |

Other Afternoons is an album by American jazz saxophonist Jimmy Lyons, recorded in 1969 and released in 1970 on the BYG label as part of their Actuel series. His first recording as leader, it features Lyons on alto saxophone along with trumpeter Lester Bowie, bassist Alan Silva, and drummer Andrew Cyrille. (Lyons had played with Silva and Cyrille in Cecil Taylor's band.)

The album was recorded as part of a marathon week-long BYG session which also produced albums by artists such as Archie Shepp (Yasmina, a Black Woman, Poem for Malcolm, and Blasé), the Art Ensemble Of Chicago (Message to Our Folks and Reese and the Smooth Ones), Grachan Moncur III (New Africa), Alan Silva (Luna Surface), Dave Burrell (Echo), Andrew Cyrille (What About?), and Sunny Murray (Homage to Africa and Sunshine).

== Reception ==
Professional ratings
Review scores
| Source | Rating |
|---|---|
| AllMusic | 4.5/5 stars |
| Tom Hull – on the Web | B+ |
| The Rolling Stone Jazz Record Guide | 3/5 stars |

In his AllMusic review, Eugene Chadbourne awarded the album 4.5 stars, stating "this album stands out as containing much superior playing, springing from what seems to be a fully realized conception of just where the music was going". He wrote: "The combination of Lyons with Lester Bowie is simply marvelous. The alto saxophonist's speciality is a kind of pungent yet unsentimental tone, kind of a thinking man's Charlie Parker, while trumpeter Bowie seems to pack every note, whether it is blasted or delicately blown, with deep pockets of potential comedy or melancholy. It is a perfect match of contrasts, made even more interesting by both players' reliance on space, in each case developed as an alternative to the amount of intense energy or sonic bombast being tossed up by other members of these players' regular associations, the Taylor group and the Art Ensemble of Chicago, respectively. From drummer Andrew Cyrille and bassist Alan Silva a listener might expect a certain kind of firepower as well as rhythmic developments being colored in terms of suggestions and impulses rather than firmly shoved in a pocket. These two master players are thrilling here in their adventurous attempts to give their friend Jimmy Lyons a whole new sound on his album."

In a JazzTimes review written in 1970, Robert Levin stated that Other Afternoons "should make anyone who can get hold of it take serious notice—not only of [Lyons'] increasing mastery of the alto saxophone, but also of his newly revealed and exceptional talent as a composer. The album is highly charged and demonstrates Jimmy's capacity to play and write with a startling rhythmic energy, a strong sense of melody, and a near-to-excruciating lyricism." Ethan Iverson called the album "an extraordinary document, one of the most poetic examples of the aggressive 'new thing' that dominated critical conversations of the era..." and wrote that it "goes from ancient to the future and back with rough finesse and measured joy... it's one of those LPs that just gets better and better with time."

Writing for Red Bull Music Academy, Britt Robson commented: "Other Afternoons features the same personnel as the Cecil Taylor Unit, with one huge difference – the ivory blizzard of Taylor's piano arpeggios is replaced by the more restrained splats of trumpeter Lester Bowie. The added space in the mix enables the underrated talents of altoist Jimmy Lyons to stretch and blossom. He composes and arranges tunes featuring his furtive, gradually intensifying phrases, with well-timed nudges from Bowie."

== Track listing ==
All compositions by Jimmy Lyons

1. "Other Afternoons" - 12:50
2. "Premonitions" - 7:30
3. "However" - 11:00
4. "My You" - 6:30

- Recorded in Paris on August 15, 1969

== Personnel ==
- Jimmy Lyons - alto saxophone
- Lester Bowie - trumpet
- Alan Silva - bass
- Andrew Cyrille - drums
