= What About? =

Studio album by Andrew Cyrille
- Released: 1969
- Recorded: August 11, 1969
- Studio: Studio Saravah, Paris
- Genre: jazz, percussion music
- Label: BYG Records; 529.316
- Producer: Jean Georgakarakos, Jean-Luc Young

Andrew Cyrille chronology
| What About? (1969) | Dialogue of the Drums (1974) |

What About? is a solo percussion album by drummer Andrew Cyrille, his first recording under his own name. It was recorded in Paris in August 1969, and released on the BYG Actuel label later that year.

The album was recorded as part of a marathon week-long BYG session which also produced albums by artists such as Archie Shepp (Yasmina, a Black Woman, Poem for Malcolm, and Blasé), the Art Ensemble Of Chicago (Message to Our Folks and Reese and the Smooth Ones), Grachan Moncur III (New Africa), Jimmy Lyons (Other Afternoons), Dave Burrell (Echo), Alan Silva (Luna Surface), and Sunny Murray (Homage to Africa and Sunshine).

== Reception ==
Professional ratings
Review scores
| Source | Rating |
|---|---|
| AllMusic | 4.5/5 stars |
| Tom Hull – on the Web | B+ |

In a review for AllMusic, Eugene Chadbourne wrote: "The selections are each clearly defined as to where they are going and present an overwhelming sense of love for the drum set, as if each movement around its rims and cymbals could become a chapter in a life story... Cyrille here is delighted by the availability of space, the chance for cymbals to completely ring out, for silence to so richly bolster his movements, be they slow-and-steady shuffling or the intense prancing of a jazz drum master... It is intensely musical, not indulging in the all-too-often course of presenting indulgent rhythmic tricks or philosophical meanderings about the spiritual meaning of the drum... Cyrille... approaches his creations as if he had managed to rise above most stereotypical notions of jazz drumming. This is one of the most refreshing sets of drum solos ever recorded."

Writing for Red Bull Music Academy, Britt Robson called the recording an "incisive and surprisingly accessible solo percussion album, which could serve as a practicum for advanced but still aspiring drummers," and commented: "Each of its five songs is slightly distinctive, beginning with the metronomic precision of the title track that bears traces of Cyrille's roots in drum and bugle corps. 'From Whence I Came' is more tom-tom oriented and features vocal sounds of exertion, while 'Rhythmical Space' is the best cymbal showcase and contains delightfully varied textures. 'Rims and Things' is just what it says – an emphasis on hitting away from the skin heads on the kit – and 'Pioneering' adds whistles to the beats... this solo feature – united by his light, rapid touch, which somehow retains warmth and isn’t brittle – remains a highlight in his catalog."

== Track listing ==
All compositions by Andrew Cyrille.

1. "What About?" – 12:58
2. "From Whence I Came" – 10:08
3. "Rhythmical Space" – 12:22
4. "Rims And Things" – 6:50
5. "Pioneering" – 4:30

== Personnel ==
- Andrew Cyrille – percussion
