= Sunshine (Sunny Murray album) =

Studio album by Sunny Murray
- Released: 1969
- Recorded: August 15, 1969
- Studio: Studio Saravah, Paris
- Genre: Free jazz
- Label: BYG Actuel; 529.348

Sunny Murray chronology
Sunny Murray (1966)	Sunshine (1969)	Big Chief (1969)

Sunshine is an album by American free jazz drummer Sunny Murray, his third as a leader. It was recorded in Paris in August 1969, and released on the BYG Actuel label later that year. On the album, Murray is joined by Arthur Jones and Roscoe Mitchell on alto saxophone, Archie Shepp and Kenneth Terroade on tenor saxophone, Lester Bowie on trumpet, Dave Burrell on piano, and Malachi Favors and Alan Silva on bass.

In 2002, Fuel 2000 reissued Sunshine along with Murray's 1970 BYG album An Even Break (Never Give a Sucker) on a single disc.

The album was recorded as part of a marathon week-long BYG session which also produced Murray's Homage to Africa as well as albums by artists such as Archie Shepp (Yasmina, a Black Woman, Poem for Malcolm, and Blasé), the Art Ensemble Of Chicago (Message to Our Folks and Reese and the Smooth Ones), Grachan Moncur III (New Africa), Alan Silva (Luna Surface), Dave Burrell (Echo), Andrew Cyrille (What About?), and Jimmy Lyons (Other Afternoons).

== Reception ==
Professional ratings
Review scores
Source	Rating
Allmusic	4/5 stars
The Penguin Guide to Jazz	3/4 stars

In a review for AllMusic, Brandon Burke wrote: "Sunny Murray's Sunshine is yet another all-star blowing session from the BYG Actuel series. Like many of the others, it is loud, very intense, and clocks in at just over 30 minutes. Also, and again like the others in the series, it is an indispensable document of late-'60s Pan-African art music. This is an opportunity to hear a number of fantastic players at the peaks of their respective careers... This is some heavy music and is not for the faint of heart, but fans of avant-garde jazz will find a great deal to enjoy here."

Britt Robson, in an article for Red Bull Music Academy, commented: "Sunshine is an appropriate title for its incandescent three songs. The longest, 'Flower Trane,' frequently has a dirge pace, but with a roiling undertow that sucks you in. Archie Shepp and Lester Bowie retain their distinctive tonalities in the maelstrom that is set by Murray's frenetic flow, so relentlessly off-kilter it becomes the norm. 'Real' is a wonderful showcase for obscure tenor Kenneth Terroade blasting away amid the powerhouse rhythm section of Murray and bassist Malachi Favors. And 'Red Cross' has an intro that is so immediately frenzied and yet seemingly coordinated among a bevy of horns, including Roscoe Mitchell and Arthur Jones, that it was wisely used as the lead track for the superb three-disc compilation of the BYG/Actuel catalogue, JazzActuel, back in 2000."

Writing for the Bleg web site, Kikanju Baku called the album "a stellar opus of vintage 60's inventive-extremism" and "glorious & ineffable, an extraordinary triumph," praising "Red Cross" as "a biblical show-down of indomitable mayhem & fraying fanaticism... It's beyond powerful, obliterating & feverishly exciting, overflowing at apex emergency."

The authors of The Penguin Guide to Jazz awarded the album 3 stars but stated: "there was never much coherence to the album."

== Track listing ==
All compositions by Sunny Murray.

1. "Flower Trane" – 13:44
2. "Real" – 8:44
3. "Red Cross" – 7:50

== Personnel ==
- Arthur Jones – alto saxophone (track 3)
- Roscoe Mitchell – alto saxophone (track 3)
- Archie Shepp – tenor saxophone (track 1)
- Kenneth Terroade – tenor saxophone
- Lester Bowie – trumpet (track 1)
- Dave Burrell – piano (tracks 1 and 3)
- Malachi Favors – bass
- Alan Silva – bass (track 1)
- Sunny Murray – drums

== Production ==
- Jean Georgakarakos, Jean-Luc Young – producers
