= Homage to Africa =

Studio album by Sunny Murray (around 1970)

Studio album by Sunny Murray
- Released: 1970
- Recorded: August 15, 1969
- Studio: Studio Saravah, Paris
- Genre: Free jazz
- Length: 28:31
- Label: BYG Actuel; 529.303

Sunny Murray chronology
Big Chief (1969)	Homage to Africa (1970)	An Even Break (Never Give a Sucker) (1970)

Homage to Africa (also released as Hommage to Africa) is an album by American free jazz drummer Sunny Murray. It was recorded in Paris in August 1969, and released on the BYG Actuel label in 1970. On the album, Murray is joined by saxophonists Roscoe Mitchell, Archie Shepp and Kenneth Terroade, trumpeter Lester Bowie, cornetist Clifford Thornton, trombonist Grachan Moncur III, vocalist Jeanne Lee, pianist Dave Burrell, bassist Alan Silva, and percussionists Malachi Favors, Earl Freeman, and Arthur Jones.

The album was recorded as part of a marathon week-long BYG session which also produced Murray's Sunshine as well as albums by artists such as Archie Shepp (Yasmina, a Black Woman, Poem for Malcolm, and Blasé), the Art Ensemble Of Chicago (Message to Our Folks and Reese and the Smooth Ones), Grachan Moncur III (New Africa), Alan Silva (Luna Surface), Dave Burrell (Echo), Andrew Cyrille (What About?), and Jimmy Lyons (Other Afternoons).

== Reception ==
Professional ratings
Review scores
Source	Rating
AllMusic	2.5/5 stars
The Penguin Guide to Jazz	3/4 stars

In a review for AllMusic, Eugene Chadbourne wrote: "The two-part track 'Suns of Africa' involves a good dozen players, many of them big names in free jazz, in a kind of big gloppy piece that, even if it was well recorded, would probably not hold up to repeated listenings. A second part of this piece, less than two minutes long, seems to have been concocted from whatever the engineer was able to catch when he flipped the tape. The second side... is a much more exciting performance, although bad recording definitely hampers the trombone sound, as well as everything else including the leader's drums. The tune 'R.I.P.' is one of Murray's better compositions; simple but put together very well."

Writing for Red Bull Music Academy, Britt Robson remarked: "'Suns of Africa,' performed by a 13-piece band, is notable for its restraint. Multiple bells and percussion, then braided flute and wordless vocals, all work to provide a ceremonial ambiance well-suited for a big canvas... The remaining two songs are best remembered for Murray's drum solo at the end of... 'R.I.P,' giving listeners a jolt of his low end thrust on bass drum and tom toms."

Critic Norman C. Weinstein commented: "The title cut... immediately established Murray as the most gentle of drummers and composers... Murray maintains an atmosphere of constant and refined coolness and gentleness throughout the recording. The impact is like that of viewing an exquisitely woven expanse of African kente cloth for the first time: dazzling bold colors softly modulate in and out of attention, as the stripes of color seem to float in a rhythmically pulsing paradise... Homage to Africa... includes three dirges, and no drummer or composer in jazz puts as much delicate sweetness as well as muscular torque into dirges."

== Track listing ==
All compositions by Sunny Murray.

1. "Suns Of Africa - Part 1" – 15:15
2. "Suns Of Africa - Part 2" – 2:40
3. "R.I.P." – 10:35
4. "Unity" – 6:55

== Personnel ==
- Roscoe Mitchell – alto saxophone, flute
- Archie Shepp – tenor saxophone (tracks 1 and 2)
- Kenneth Terroade – tenor saxophone, flute
- Lester Bowie – trumpet, flugelhorn (tracks 1 and 2)
- Clifford Thornton – cornet
- Grachan Moncur III – trombone
- Jeanne Lee – voice, bells
- Dave Burrell – piano
- Alan Silva – bass
- Arthur Jones – percussion (tracks 1 and 2)
- Malachi Favors – xylophone, bells (tracks 1 and 2)
- Earl Freeman – timpani, bells (tracks 1 and 2)
- Sunny Murray – drums

== Production ==
- Jean Georgakarakos, Jean-Luc Young – producers
- Claude Jauvert – engineer
