= Beb Guérin =

French musician (1941–1980)

Bernard "Beb" Guérin (December 22, 1941 in La Rochelle – November 14, 1980 in Paris) was a French jazz double-bassist.

Beb Guérin first began playing bass at age 23, working in the 1960s with Sonny Criss, Jacques Coursil, François Tusques, Alan Silva, and Claude Delcloo later in the decade, as well as with free jazz groups in Paris clubs. In the early 1970s he worked with Ambrose Jackson, Steve Lacy, Sunny Murray, Sonny Sharrock, Archie Shepp, Alan Shorter, and Clifford Thornton, and worked frequently with Michel Portal for most of the 1970s.

== Discography ==
=== As co-leader ===
- Chateauvallon 76 (L'Escargot, 1979) with Léon Francioli, Bernard Lubat, and Michel Portal
- Conversations (Nato, 1981) with François Méchali

=== As sideman ===
With Jacques Coursil

- Way Ahead (BYG, 1969)
- Black Suite (BYG, 1969 [1971])

With Colette Magny

- Feu et Rythme (Le Chant du Monde, 1971)
- Répression (Le Chant du Monde, 1972)

With Alan Silva

- Luna Surface (BYG, 1969)
- Seasons (BYG, 1970 [1971])
- My Country (Leo, 1971 [1989])

With Clifford Thornton

- Ketchaoua (BYG, 1969)
- The Panther and the Lash (America, 1970 [1971])

With François Tusques

- Free Jazz (Disques Mouloudji, 1965)
- La maison fille du soleil (Studio Scriptone Nantes, 1965)
- Le nouveau jazz (Disques Mouloudji, 1967)
- La reine des vampires 1967 (Cacophonic, 1967 [2014])
- La chasse au Snark (Cacophonic, 1967–1971 [2020])
- Alors Nosferatu combina un plan ingénieux (Cacophonic, 1969 [2019])
- Intercommunal Music (Shandar, 1971)

With others

- Transfiguration (SABA, 1967) with Rolf Kühn and Joachim Kühn
- Auto Jazz: Tragic Destiny of Lorenzo Bandini (MPS, 1968) with Barney Wilen
- Aquariana (BYG, 1969) with Burton Greene
- Big Chief (Pathé, 1969) with Sunny Murray
- Love Rejoice (BYG, 1969) with Kenneth Terroade
- Aco dei de madrugada (One Morning I Waked Up Very Early) (BYG, 1969) with Grachan Moncur III
- La Vie de Bohème (BYG, 1969) with Dave Burrell
- Scorpio (BYG, 1969 [1971]) with Arthur Jones
- Live in Antibes (BYG, 1970 [1971]) with Archie Shepp and the Full Moon Ensemble
- Monkey-Pockie-Boo (BYG, 1970) with Sonny Sharrock
- Jeanne d'Arc (Mercury, 1972) with Graeme Allwright
- La guêpe (Futura, 1972) with Bernard Vitet
- À Chateauvallon - No, No But It May Be (Le Chant Du Monde, 1973) with Michel Portal
- Résurgence (Musica, 1977) with Jacques Thollot
- Chante Haïti (Arion, 1977) with Toto Bissainthe
