= Seasons (Alan Silva album) =

Live album by Alan Silva
- Released: 1971
- Recorded: December 29, 1970
- Venue: Studio 104, ORTF, Paris, France
- Genre: Free jazz
- Length: 2:23:28
- Label: BYG Actuel; 42-43-44
- Producer: Jean Georgakarakos, Jean-Luc Young

Alan Silva chronology
| Luna Surface (1969) | Seasons (1971) | Inner Song (1974) |

Seasons is a live, triple-LP album by multi-instrumentalist Alan Silva. It was recorded in December 1970 at ORTF Studio 104 in Paris, France, and was released in 1971 by BYG Records as part of their Actuel series. On the album, Silva is joined by a large ensemble known as the Celestrial Communication Orchestra.

The music recorded on Seasons came about when Silva was asked to organize a concert at short notice following a cancellation by Stan Getz. Silva assembled what he called "a once in a lifetime All Star Band," constructing the music "right there on the stage." The concert, which was broadcast live and well-recorded, was attended by an overflow crowd, and organizers had to set up speakers outside the hall. Silva recalled: "The engineers thought it was a fantastic challenge: unlimited sound density with no breaks, everybody had a cymbal, three pianos, all mixed down live to two channels. When I heard the tapes, I absolutely insisted they release it all, as a triple album."

== Reception ==
Professional ratings
Review scores
| Source | Rating |
|---|---|
| AllMusic | 4.5/5 stars |
| Encyclopedia of Popular Music | 3/5 stars |

In a review for AllMusic, Steve Loewy called the album a "remarkable gargantuan effort... for which the term 'masterpiece' is not too far a stretch," and wrote: "this is a magnificent, rambling, chaotic, lavish, and often meandering spectacle... It takes the concept of 'sheets of sound' to the next level... The results are absolutely thrilling, if not always inspiring, and there are many high points... the level of improvisation remains consistently at the highest levels. It is wild and free, and the listener receptive to free improvisation is likely to be held in rapturous attention. Destined to be a classic of its genre, Seasons offers a full-scale radical bombardment from many perspectives, resulting in a smorgasbord of delights."

Steve Moffic, writing for Jazz Digest, stated: "Seasons begins with a rumbling, rippling theme explored by three pianos... which suggests the forthcoming 'storm.' Strong solos by Joseph Jarman and Michel Portal on reeds and Silva on stringed instruments are highlights. The set is long, intense, lagging and wild."

== Track listing ==
Composed by Alan Silva.

Side one
| No. | Title | Length |
|---|---|---|
| 1. | "Seasons" | 25:12 |

Side two
| No. | Title | Length |
|---|---|---|
| 1. | "Seasons" | 22:45 |

Side three
| No. | Title | Length |
|---|---|---|
| 1. | "Seasons" | 23:15 |

Side four
| No. | Title | Length |
|---|---|---|
| 1. | "Seasons" | 20:08 |

Side five
| No. | Title | Length |
|---|---|---|
| 1. | "Seasons" | 26:08 |

Side six
| No. | Title | Length |
|---|---|---|
| 1. | "Seasons" | 27:00 |

== Personnel ==
- Alan Silva – bass, violin, sarangi
- Steve Lacy – soprano saxophone
- Michel Portal – alto saxophone, Clarinet
- Robin Kenyatta – alto saxophone, flute
- Ronnie Beer – tenor saxophone, soprano saxophone, flute
- Joseph Jarman – saxophone, flute, bassoon
- Roscoe Mitchell – saxophone, flute, oboe
- Alan Shorter – trumpet
- Lester Bowie – trumpet, flugelhorn
- Bernard Vitet – trumpet, French horn
- Dieter Gewissler – violin
- Jouk Minor – viola
- Kent Carter – cello
- Irene Aebi – cello, celeste
- Beb Guérin (credited as "bg") – bass
- Malachi Favors (credited as "mf") – bass
- Dave Burrell – piano
- Joachim Kühn – piano
- Bobby Few (credited as "bf") – piano
- Famoudou Don Moye – drums, percussion
- Jerome Cooper – drums, percussion
- Oliver Johnson – timpani, percussion
