= Jeanne Lee =

American jazz singer (1939–2000)

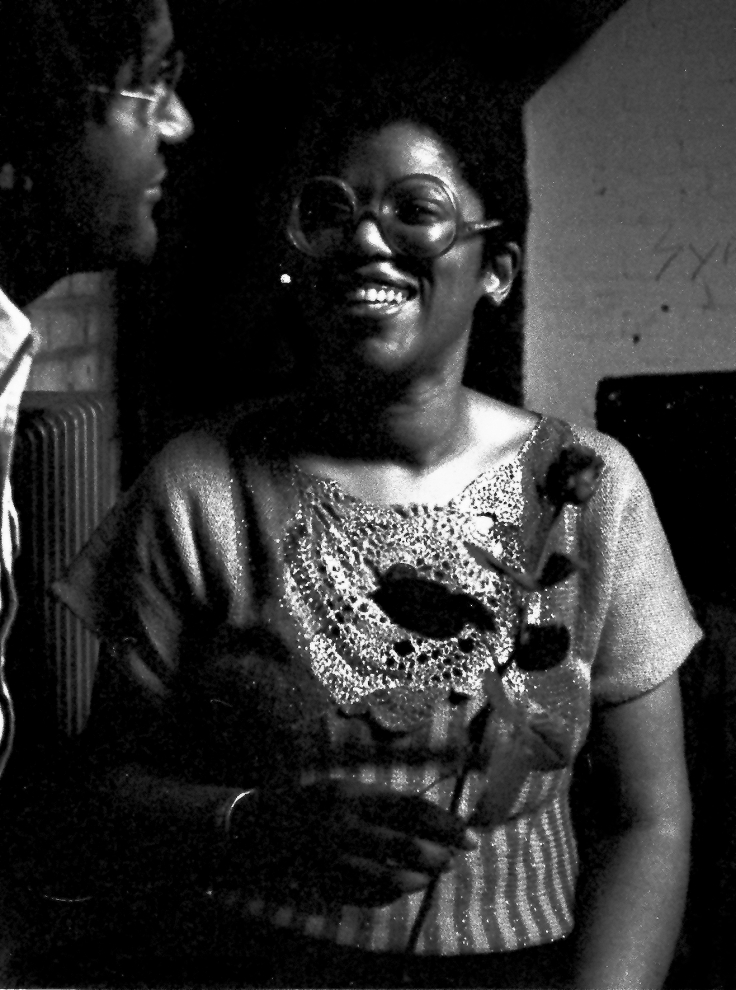
- Lee in 1984
- Born: January 29, 1939; New York, U.S.
- Died: October 25, 2000 (aged 61); Tijuana, Baja California, Mexico
- Education: Bard College (BA); New York University (MA)
- Occupations: Jazz singer, poet, composer
- Spouse(s): David Hazelton; Gunter Hampel
- Children: 2

Jeanne Lee (January 29, 1939 – October 25, 2000) was an American jazz singer, poet and composer. Best known for a wide range of vocal styles she mastered, Lee collaborated with numerous distinguished composers and performers who included Gunter Hampel, Andrew Cyrille, Ran Blake, Carla Bley, Anthony Braxton, Marion Brown, Archie Shepp, Mal Waldron, Mark Whitecage and many others.

== Biography ==
Jeanne Lee was born in New York, United States. Her father, S. Alonzo Lee, was a concert and church singer whose work influenced her at an early age. She was educated at the Walden School (a private school), and subsequently at Bard College, where she studied child psychology, literature and dance. During her time at Bard she created choreography for pieces by various classical and jazz composers, ranging from Johann Sebastian Bach to Arnold Schoenberg. In 1961 she graduated from Bard College with a B.A. degree. That year she performed as a duo at the Apollo Theater's Amateur Night contest with pianist Ran Blake, a fellow Bard alumnus, and after winning made her first record, The Newest Sound Around. The album gained considerable popularity in Europe, where Lee and Blake toured in 1963, but went unnoticed in the US. At this point, Lee's major influence was Abbey Lincoln.

During the mid-1960s, Lee was exploring sound poetry, happenings, Fluxus-influenced art, and other multidisciplinary approaches to art. She was briefly married to sound poet David Hazelton, and composed music for the sound poetry by poets such as Dick Higgins and Alison Knowles, becoming active in the California art scene of the time. In the late 1960s, she returned to the jazz scene and started performing and recording, quickly establishing herself as one of the most distinctively independent and creative artists in the field. Already a few years after her return she had a major role in Carla Bley's magnum opus, Escalator over the Hill (1971), and recorded albums with eminent musicians including Archie Shepp, Enrico Rava and Marion Brown. In 1967, while in Europe, Lee began a long association with vibraphonist and composer Gunter Hampel, whom she eventually married. They had a son, Ruomi Lee-Hampel, and a daughter, Cavana Lee-Hampel.

In 1976, she represented the African-American spiritual musical tradition in John Cage's Apartment House 1776, which was composed for the U.S. Bicentennial. The experience inspired Lee to devote more attention to her composing, and create extended works. The immediate result was Prayer for Our Time, a jazz oratorio.

Lee continued to perform and make recordings until her death in 2000, recording for labels such as Birth, BYG Actuel, JCOA, ECM, Black Saint/Soul Note, OWL and Horo. She sang on a large number of albums by Gunter Hampel. In her late years, she ran the Jeanne Lee Ensemble, which performed a fusion of poetry, music and dance, and collaborated and toured with pianist Mal Waldron.

Lee was also active as educator. She received a MA in Education from New York University in 1972 and taught at various institutions both in the US and in Europe. She published a number of short features on music for Amsterdam News and various educational writings, including a textbook on the history of jazz music for grades four through seven.

Lee died of cancer in 2000 in Tijuana, Mexico, aged 61. She was survived by her husband and children.

== Discography ==
- The Newest Sound Around with Ran Blake (RCA Victor, 1962) – recorded in 1961
- Conspiracy (Earthforms, 1975) – recorded in 1974
- Don't Freeze Yourself to Death Over There in Those Mountains (1984)
- African Moods with Archie Shepp (Circle, 1984)
- You Stepped Out of a Cloud with Ran Blake (Owl, 1989)
- Natural Affinities (Owl, 1992)
- Here and Now with David Eyges (Word of Mouth, 1994)
- The Newest Sound You Never Heard with Ran Blake (A-Side, 2019) – recorded in 1966-67

With Andrew Cyrille

- Celebration (IPS, 1975)
- Nuba (Black Saint, 1979)

With Gunter Hampel

- Gunter Hampel Group + Jeanne Lee (Wergo, 1969)
- Spirits (Birth, 1971)
- Waltz for 3 Universes in a Corridor (Birth, 1972)
- Familie (Birth, 1972)
- Angel (Birth, 1972)
- Enfant Terrible (Birth, 1975)
- Freedom of the Universe (Birth, 1979)
- Oasis (Horo, 1979)
- Companion (Birth, 1982)

With Mal Waldron

- After Hours (Owl, 1994)
- White Road Black Rain (Tokuma, 1995)
- Travelin' in Soul Time (BV Haast, 1997)

With others

- Archie Shepp, Blasé(BYG, 1969)
- Sunny Murray, Homage to Africa (BYG Actuel, 1970) – recorded in 1969
- Carla Bley, Escalator over the Hill (JCOA, 1971) – recorded in 1968-71
- Anthony Braxton, Town Hall 1972 (Trio, 1972) – live
- Grachan Moncur III & Jazz Composer's Orchestra, Echoes of Prayer (JCOA, 1975)
- Enrico Rava, Quotation Marks (ECM, 1976)
- Marion Brown, Afternoon of a Georgia Faun (ECM, 1970)
- Bob Moses, When Elephants Dream of Music (Gramavision, 1983) – recorded in 1982
- Reggie Workman, Images (Music & Arts, 1990) – live recorded in 1989
- Reggie Workman, Altered Spaces (Leo, 1993) – live recorded in 1992

== Selected compositions ==
- In These Last Days, poem/composition (1973)
- Prayer for Our Time, jazz oratorio (1976)
- La Conference des oiseaux, jazz opera
- Emergence, five-part suite
