= Richard Dunbar =

- Born: May 22, 1944; Brooklyn, New York
- Died: February 8, 2006 (aged 61)
- Genre: Free jazz
- Occupation: Jazz musician
- Instrument: French horn

Richard Dunbar was a player of the French horn, playing in the free jazz scene. He was born in Brooklyn, New York, on May 22, 1944. He began studying the French horn in high school and never put it down. He also was known to play the bass guitar and shekere, an African percussion instrument.

His first known appearance on record was on a 1968 recording by Bill Dixon, University of the Streets. He appeared as a sideman with players such as Sam Rivers, Earl Freeman and Ted Daniel. In the 1980s, he started a small label, Jahari Records, where he released five records under his own name:

In the late 1980s and early 1990s, Dunbar also had associations with Sun Ra. Around 1993, Dunbar moved to Paris, where he lived, continuing to play and teach music, until February 8, 2006, when he died suddenly at the age of 61, apparently of a heart attack, on the way to a gig. At the time he had just completed his first film and was working on the release of 5 new recordings.

== Discography ==
- Clear-Eyed Vision (1981)
- Running Buddies, Volume 1 (1982)
- Running Buddies, Volume 2 (1983)
- Dream Messages (1986)
- Dancing To The Light (1987)
