= Rock Out =

Rock Out may refer to:

- "Rock Out" (Pantera song), 1983
- "Rock Out" (Motörhead song), 2008
- "Rock Out", a song from Art Ensemble of Chicago's 1969 album Message to Our Folks
