= Big Chief (Sunny Murray album) =

Studio album by Sunny Murray
- Released: 1969
- Recorded: January 11, 1969
- Studio: Studio E.T.A., Paris
- Genre: Free jazz
- Label: Pathé Records; 2C062-10096

Sunny Murray chronology
| Sunshine (1969) | Big Chief (1969) | Homage to Africa (1970) |

Big Chief is an album by American free jazz drummer Sunny Murray. It was recorded in Paris in January, 1969, and was originally released on the Pathé label later that year. In 2008, it was reissued on LP by Eremite Records. On the album, Murray is joined by flutist Becky Friend, saxophonists Ronnie Beer and Kenneth Terroade, trumpeter Bernard Vitet, violinist Alan Silva, pianist François Tusques, and bassist Beb Guérin. In addition, poet H. Le Roy Bibbs joins the group on one track.

== Reception ==
Professional ratings
Review scores
| Source | Rating |
|---|---|
| AllMusic | 3/5 stars |

In a review for All About Jazz, Clifford Allen called the album "a set that traverses the vicious to the romantic to the whimsical," and commented: "The term 'swing' might not obviously apply to dense, go-for-broke collective improvisations without countable beats, but that is not the type of 'swing' rhythm Murray is going for. The emphasis here is on 'acoustical,' the ensemble creating music at alternately very high or very low continuous audible levels into which sounds of different properties blend, ebb and flow as a single omnivalent tone. Such a tone operates on several different levels, toying with polyphony and constancy. The subtleties of relationships within this area create rhythm, and their delicate play leads to a foot-patting sensibility... the players are all top-notch and play with an extraordinary amount of fire in an engaging post-Albert Ayler/post-John Coltrane milieu. Rather, the sonic waves of the whole experience take one's body and shove it—from the hum of cymbals, low pizzicato tones and roiling ivory quilt to preachy tenor honks and flywheel trumpet, all cast upwards to tremendous effect."

Writing for Point of Departure, Stuart Broomer observed that Murray "achieves striking coherence and intensity with an octet made that includes Americans, French and South Africans... Murray's band concept is very much an ensemble one, and his own cymbals impart a constant shimmer to the sound that's reflected in the continuous strings... That rich texture both exalts and subsumes the individuals, so that it's the sheer sound of the band that you remember, whether jerkily making their way through the angular 'Hilarious Paris,' driving on poet Hart Leroy Bibb on his 'Straight Ahead,' or playing Murray's arrangement of Richard Rodgers' 'This Nearly was Mine,' a wailing, hymn-like recitation that takes on the mood of a lyrical crucifixion."

John Corbett called the album "one of the drummer's best efforts" and "an intensely raucous set of relatively short free jazz bursts."

== Track listing ==
1. "Angels And Devils" (Jacques Coursil, Sunny Murray) – 5:14
2. "Hilarious Paris" (Murray) – 5:30
3. "Now We Know" (Murray) – 7:44
4. "Angel Son" (Murray) – 7:30
5. "Straight Ahead" (Le Roy Bibbs, Sunny Murray) – 9:30
6. "This Nearly Was Mine" (Richard Rodgers) – 5:12

== Personnel ==
- Becky Friend – flute
- Ronnie Beer – alto saxophone
- Kenneth Terroade – tenor saxophone
- Bernard Vitet – trumpet
- Alan Silva – violin
- François Tusques – piano
- Beb Guérin – bass
- H. Le Roy Bibbs – voice, poetry
- Sunny Murray – drums, percussion
