= Ramblin' (Paul Bley album) =

Studio album by Paul Bley
- Released: 1969
- Recorded: July 1, 1966
- Studios: Studio RCA, Rome
- Genre: Jazz
- Length: 42:48
- Label: BYG Actuel 529.313
- Producers: Jean Georgakarakos, Jean-Luc Young

Paul Bley chronology
Closer (1965)	Ramblin' (1969)	Blood (1966)

Ramblin' is an album led by jazz pianist Paul Bley recorded in Italy in 1966 and released on the French BYG Actuel label.

== Reception ==
Professional ratings
Review scores
Source	Rating
Allmusic	4/5 stars
DownBeat	4.5/5 stars
The Penguin Guide to Jazz Recordings	3/4 stars

Allmusic awarded the album 4 stars stating "Ramblin' comes from an adventurous period in Paul Bley's career, at a time when he was associated with some of the more avant-garde elements. His playing often takes an attractively aggressive approach, which he tempered in later years".

== Track listing ==
1. "Both" (Annette Peacock) – 9:30
2. "Albert's Love Theme" (Peacock) – 9:23
3. "Ida Lupino" (Carla Bley) – 3:30
4. "Ramblin'" (Ornette Coleman) – 5:50
5. "Touching" (Peacock) – 7:30
6. "Mazatalon" (Paul Bley) – 7:32

== Personnel ==
- Paul Bley – piano
- Mark Levinson – bass
- Barry Altschul – drums
