= Ted Daniel =

American jazz trumpeter and composer

Ted Daniel (born June 4, 1943) is an American jazz trumpeter and composer.

== Biography ==
He studied trumpet in elementary school, and began his professional career playing local gigs with his childhood friend, the guitarist Sonny Sharrock. Daniel briefly attended Berklee School of Music and Southern Illinois University. Following that, in 1966, Daniel was drafted in the army, and served with the 9th and 25th Infantry Division Bands in the Mekong Delta of Vietnam during the Vietnam War.

After his discharge from the Army in 1968, Daniel attended Central State College, Ohio, on a full music scholarship, where he met and studied with Dr. Makanda Ken McIntyre. After a year, Daniel returned to New York City and eventually received a bachelor of music degree in theory and composition from the City College of New York. Daniel had begun his recording career while studying in Ohio. He returned briefly to New York to record Sonny Sharrock's first album Black Woman. His second recording was with a band he co-led (Brute Force) with his brother, Richard Daniel. The recording was entitled Brute Force on the Embryo label, produced by Herbie Mann. Since then, Daniel has participated in more than 30 published recordings with such artists as: Archie Shepp, Dewey Redman, Andrew Cyrille, Sam Rivers, Billy Bang and Henry Threadgill.

Ted Daniel has held workshops at Amherst College, Bennington College, Williams College and the University of Hosei in Tokyo, Japan. He has also conducted a seminar in Madrid, Spain, as well as work in his community conducting summer music workshops for high and college age students. Daniel has produced three albums under his own name: The Ted Daniel Sextet on Ujamaa Records, Tapestry on Sun Records, and In The Beginning on Altura recordings. This recording features a twelve-piece ensemble including such artist as Oliver Lake, Arthur Blythe, Charles Tyler and David Murray. Eventually this ensemble evolved into a larger group called "Energy", an eighteen-piece band recorded live at Ali's Alley, a double album release on Ujamma Records in 2023.

Daniel has been the recipient of a NEA compositional grant and awarded "Talent Deserving Wider Recognition" from Downbeat Magazine. Presently, he is writing and performing with his new group, the International Brass and Membrane Corporation (IBMC). This trio was conceived as a flexible and expandable creative music performance group, which utilizes instruments from the brass and membrane instrument families. He has also made several recordings with Charles Compo's "The Phibes" band. On May 20, 2008, Porter Records reissued Ted Daniel's Tapestry album, with a bonus track from the original performance of 1974 recorded at Ornette Coleman's Artist House. Daniel has also formed a duo with Michael Marcus on B♭ clarinet and Daniel on trumpet and assorted brass. Their first release self-titled Duology on Boxholder Records received excellent reviews. Duology's second CD on Soul Note Records, entitled Golden Atoms, was released in June 2008. In May 2009, Ujamaa Records released the Ted Daniel Trio CD The Loft Years), Volume one.

== Discography ==
=== As leader ===
- 1970: Ted Daniel Sextet with Warren Benbow (Ujamaa Records released 1972)
- 1974: Tapestry with Khan Jamal, Jerome Cooper, Richard Daniel (Released on Sun Records 1977. Reissued on Porter Records 2008)
- 1975: In the Beginning with Arthur Blythe, Oliver Lake, David Murray, Charles Tyler, Richard Dunbar, Steve Reid, Ahmed Abdullah, (Altura Records released 1997)
- 1975: Ted Daniel Trio with Richard Pierce, Tatsuya Nakamura (Ujamaa Records released 2009)
- 2006: Duology with Michael Marcus, clarinet (Boxholder Records released 2007)
- 1981: Ted Daniel Solo Ted Daniel Ujamaa Records (released 2013)
- 1975: Innerconnection with Danny Carter, Oliver Lake (NoBusiness Records released 2014)
- 2008: Golden Atoms Duology with Michael Marcus (Soul Note Records released 2008)
- 2012: Duology with Andrew Cyrille and Michael Marcus (Jazzwerkstatt Records released 2012)

=== As sideman ===
With Sonny Sharrock

- Black Woman (Embryo, 1968

With Archie Shepp

- Things Have Got to Change (Impulse!, 1971)

With Dewey Redman

- The Ear of the Behearer (Impulse!, 1973)
- Coincide (Impulse!, 1974)

With Sam Rivers

- Crystals (Impulse!, 1974)

With Henry Threadgill

- Rag, Bush and All (RCA Novus, 1989)
- Song Out of My Trees (Black Saint, 1994)

With Andrew Cyrille

- Celebration (IPS, 1976)
- Junction with Lisle Atkinson, David Ware (IPS, 1976)
- Metamusicians' Stomp (Black Saint, 1978)
- Special People (Soul Note, 1980)
- The Navigator (Soul Note, 1982)

With Tatsuya Nakamura

- Jazz Fellows with Joe Bowie, Hideaki Mochizuki
- Song of Pat with Oliver Lake, Richard Davis (Trio, 1976)

With Billy Bang

- Vietnam: The Aftermath with John Hicks, Michael Carvin, Frank Lowe (Justin Time, 2001)
- Vietnam: Reflections with James Spaulding, Henry Threadgill, Butch Morris, Curtis Lundy (Just In Time, 2005)
