= Archie Shepp and the Full Moon Ensemble =

Archie Shepp and the Full Moon Ensemble: Live in Antibes

Live album by Archie Shepp
- Released: 1971
- Recorded: July 18, 1970 (Antibes, France)
- Genre: Free Jazz
- Label: BYG Actuel
- Producers: Jean Georgakarakos, Jean-Luc Young

Archie Shepp chronology
Archie Shepp & Philly Joe Jones (1970)	Archie Shepp and the Full Moon Ensemble: Live in Antibes (1971)	Coral Rock (1970)

Professional ratings
Review scores
Source	Rating
Allmusic	3/5 stars

Archie Shepp and the Full Moon Ensemble: Live in Antibes is a live album by Archie Shepp and the Full Moon Ensemble recorded at the Juan les Pins Jazz Festival in Antibes, France, on July 18, 1970. It was originally released on the BYG Actuel label in two volumes and re-released as a double CD in 2002. The album features a performance by Shepp, Clifford Thornton, Alan Shorter, Joseph Dejean, Beb Guerin and Claude Delcloo.

== Track listing ==
All compositions by Archie Shepp

1. "The Early Bird" - 48:48
2. "Huru" - 48:51

Recorded live at Antibes - Juan les Pins Jazz Festival, July 18, 1970

== Personnel ==
- Archie Shepp – tenor saxophone, piano, recitation
- Clifford Thornton - trumpet, piano, shehnai
- Alan Shorter - flugelhorn
- Joseph Dejean - guitar
- Beb Guerin - double bass
- Claude Delcloo - drums
