= Charred Earth =

Live album by Sunny Murray
- Released: 1977
- Recorded: January 1, 1977
- Venue: Ali's Alley, New York City
- Genre: Free jazz
- Label: Kharma Records; PK-1
- Producer: Herb Friedwald, Dan Serro

Sunny Murray chronology
An Even Break (Never Give a Sucker) (1970)	Charred Earth (1977)	Apple Cores (1978)

Charred Earth is a live album by drummer Sunny Murray. It was recorded in January 1977, and was released later that year by Kharma Records. On the album, Murray is joined by members of the group known as The Untouchable Factor: reed player Byard Lancaster, pianist Dave Burrell, and bassist Bob Reid.

== Reception ==
Professional ratings
Review scores
Source	Rating
AllMusic	3/5 stars
Encyclopedia of Popular Music	3/5 stars
Virgin Encyclopedia of Jazz	2/5 stars

Writing for Bells, Henry Kuntz stated that the album "shows [Murray] in fine form, especially on the title track. It is closer in spirit to his work with Albert Ayler... though more fluid now, less subtle, and rolling more from the bottom of his drum set, making greater, more obvious use of the high-hat, and going to the top cymbals mainly for accents (as opposed to the drone-like function they served in much of his earlier work)." However, Kuntz cautioned: "The band... leaves much to be desired... the record's main interest is as a contemporary document of Murray's drumming.

In an article for Avant Music News, Tom Orange called the album a "standout," and praised "Happiness Tears" and "Tree Tops," comparing the latter to John Coltrane's "Alabama".

== Track listing ==
1. "Charred Earth" (Murray) – 12:00
2. "Seven Steps To Heaven" (Victor Feldman, Miles Davis) – 9:00
3. "Tree Tops" (Murray) – 6:00
4. "Happiness Tears" (Murray) – 6:00
5. "Peace" (Horace Silver) – 8:00

== Personnel ==
- Sunny Murray – drums
- Byard Lancaster – reeds
- Dave Burrell – piano
- Bob Reid – bass
