= Dialogue of the Drums =

Live album by Andrew Cyrille and Milford Graves
- Released: 1974
- Recorded: January 1974
- Genre: jazz, percussion music
- Length: 49:11
- Label: Institute of Percussive Studies; IPS ST001
- Producer: Andrew Cyrille, Milford Graves

Andrew Cyrille chronology
What About? (1969)	Dialogue of the Drums (1974)	Celebration (1976)

Dialogue of the Drums is a live album by American percussionists Andrew Cyrille and Milford Graves, recorded in January 1974 and released later that year by Cyrille's and Graves's Institute of Percussive Studies.

The album is the culmination of a musical association that dated back to April 1969, and that involved appearances in concert halls and cultural centers, as well as work for NBC Television. Many of the concerts also included drummer Rashied Ali.

== Reception ==
Professional ratings
Review scores
Source	Rating
AllMusic	3/5 stars
The Rolling Stone Jazz Record Guide	3/5 stars

In a review for AllMusic, Brian Olewnick wrote: "Both musicians are steeped in African drum traditions as well as being free improvisers of the highest order, so it's not surprising that the resulting concert is highly rhythmic, densely 'noisy,' and always very imaginative. Utilizing an enormous arsenal of percussive instruments in addition to the standard drum set, Cyrille and Graves, as the album title suggests, engage in intense conversations with each other, interacting with loose precision and exploding into frenzies of clattering assault. Isolating the individual contributions is virtually fruitless, but one can discern Cyrille's patented foot stomps and body smackings, as well as Graves' vocalizations and call and response activities with the audience. The LP release is something of a collector's item, but the bracing and unusual music make it one well worth seeking out."

Writing for The Wire, Alan Licht commented: "Affirmation of African heritage is all-pervasive in this meeting of kindred spirits. Cyrille, like Graves, has an expansive grasp of percussion techniques, and they share awareness of music's broader cultural significance in terms of health, communication and collective identity. During this concert... their instrumentation includes gongs, bongos, osi drums, agogo bells, balafon and temple blocks. Such varied percussion calls for different ways of playing. Both players carry that knowledge back to their kit drumming. They use their voices too, articulate bodies generating meaning within a vibrantly alive field of transmission, reception and exchange."

== Track listing ==
1. "Message To The Ancestors" (Cyrille/Graves) - 10:14
2. "Blessing From The Rain Forest" (Graves/Cyrille) - 6:16
3. "Nagarah" (Graves/Cyrille) - 3:04
4. "Rejuvenation" (Cyrille/Graves) - 5:19
5. "The Soul Is The Music" (Cyrille/Graves) - 7:46
6. "The Substance Of The Vision" (Cyrille) - 7:07
7. "Call And Response" (Graves) - 6:13
- Recorded in January 1974.

== Personnel ==
- Andrew Cyrille – drums, percussion, voice
- Milford Graves – drums, percussion, voice
