= Nuba (album) =

Studio album by Andrew Cyrille, Jeanne Lee, Jimmy Lyons
- Released: 1979
- Recorded: June 1979
- Genre: Jazz
- Length: 45:23
- Label: Black Saint
- Producer: Giacomo Pellicciotti

Andrew Cyrille chronology
Metamusicians' Stomp (1978)	Nuba (1979)	Special People (1980)

Nuba is an album by American jazz drummer Andrew Cyrille, vocalist Jeanne Lee, and saxophonist Jimmy Lyons, recorded in 1979 for the Italian Black Saint label.

The two versions of "Nuba" are based on Jeanne Lee's poem "Nuba", written in June 1979 and dedicated to Lyons and Cyrille. "In These Last Days" is a setting of Lee's 1973 poem of the same name, from her collection "The Valley of Astonishment and Bewilderment." The texts of both poems are included in the liner notes, and the opening lines of "Nuba" appear on the album cover preceding the title.

== Reception ==
Professional ratings
Review scores
Source	Rating
AllMusic	4/5 stars
The Penguin Guide to Jazz Recordings	4/4 stars
The Rolling Stone Jazz & Blues Album Guide	4/5 stars
Tom Hull – on the Web	B+

The AllMusic review by Ron Wynn stated: "Those seeking a standard trio or straight jazz date are advised to look elsewhere; there was nothing conventional or predictable about this one". The authors of The Penguin Guide to Jazz Recordings awarded the album 4 stars, and wrote: "this highly lyrical album is almost a miniature opera, developing the ideas on Cyrille's astonishing solo record, What About?, which finds him vocalizing – albeit without words – the pain and frustration of the black experience in America. Lyons's calm and stoical approach is the perfect conduit for this music, and both men seem to be working at the opposite extreme from the fierce abstraction of the [Cecil] Taylor group."

In his article "Jeanne Lee's Voice," writer Eric Porter analyzes Lee's poetry and performance in "In These Last Days," placing it in the context of her commitment to social change. He acknowledges that analysis of the poem's text is incomplete without taking into account "how Lee improvises the poem in performance, for it is her intonation, her repetition and elongation of words and syllables, her screams and nonlinguistic utterances, and her interactions with the other instrumentalists on the piece that allow us to better understand how her improvising voice and body may also have been engaged in a less evident kind of tactical work both in its social moment and in relation to the wider system of meanings embedded in improvisational practices." Porter notes that the first half of the poem expresses an urgency that situates the text within the social crises and struggles that occurred in the United States during the 1960s and 70s, but recognizes the optimism of the closing lines, which may be read as a statement of Lee's ongoing focus on family and on using music to initiate social transformation: "There is great joy / in being / Naima's Mother / and unassailable strength in being on the Way."

== Track listing ==
All compositions by Andrew Cyrille except as indicated

1. "Nuba 1" – 7:27
2. "Cornbread Picnic (Maize)" – 4:58
3. "The One Before Zero" – 5:23
4. "JJ&A" (Andrew Cyrille, Jeanne Lee, Jimmy Lyons) – 5:12
5. "In These Last Days" (Lee) – 7:35
6. "Sorry" (Lyons) – 6:58
7. "Nuba 2" – 7:50

- Recorded at Fontana Studio 7 in Milano, Italy in June 1979

== Personnel ==
- Andrew Cyrille – drums, percussion
- Jeanne Lee – vocals, poetry
- Jimmy Lyons – alto saxophone
