= Celebration (Andrew Cyrille album) =

Studio album by Andrew Cyrille
- Released: 1975
- Recorded: February 26, 1975, and May 14, 1975
- Venue: Ali's Alley Studio 77, New York City
- Genre: Jazz
- Label: Institute of Percussive Studies; IPS ST002

Andrew Cyrille chronology
Dialogue of the Drums (1974)	Celebration (1975)	Junction (1976)

Celebration is an album by drummer Andrew Cyrille. It was recorded in February and May 1975 at Ali's Alley Studio 77 in New York City, and was released later that year by the Institute of Percussive Studies. On the album, Cyrille is joined by members of the band Māōnō: saxophonist David S. Ware, trumpeter Ted Daniel, vocalist Jeanne Lee, synthesizer player Romulus Franceschini, pianist Donald Smith, bassist Stafford James, and percussionist Alphonse Cimber. The musicians are joined by poet Elouise Loftin.

== Reception ==
Professional ratings
Review scores
Source	Rating
AllMusic	3/5 stars
The Rolling Stone Jazz Record Guide	3/5 stars
The Virgin Encyclopedia of Jazz	3/5 stars

In a review for The Rolling Stone Jazz Record Guide, Ashley Kahn stated that the album "produced an improvised collage that swung in its experimental mayhem, spliced with revolutionary lyrics."

== Track listing ==
"Gossip" composed by Jimmy Lyons. Remaining tracks by Andrew Cyrille.

1. "Haitian Heritage (Pt. 1): Voices Of The Lineage" – 12:01
2. "Haitian Heritage (Pt. 1): Agowé, Hūntō (Spirit In The Drum)" – 2:46
3. "Haitian Heritage (Pt. 2): Levitation" – 12:15
4. "Fate" – 9:32
5. "Gossip" – 7:25
6. "Non-Expectation Celebration" – 9:25

== Personnel ==
- Andrew Cyrille – drums, percussion
- David S. Ware – tenor saxophone
- Ted Daniel – trumpet
- Jeanne Lee – vocals
- Romulus Franceschini – synthesizer
- Donald Smith – piano
- Stafford James – bass
- Alphonse Cimber – percussion
- Elouise Loftin – performer (poet)
