= Live at the Pan-African Festival =

Live album by Archie Shepp
- Released: 1971
- Recorded: July 29–30, 1969 (Algiers, Algeria)
- Genre: Free Jazz
- Label: BYG Actuel; CDGR 292-2 (CD re-issue)
- Producer: Jean Georgakarakos, Jean-Luc Young

Archie Shepp chronology
Kwanza (1969)	Live at the Pan-African Festival (1971)	Yasmina, a Black Woman (1969)

Professional ratings
Review scores
Source	Rating
Allmusic	link

Live at the Pan-African Festival is a live recording of Archie Shepp's performance in Algiers on July 29–30, 1969, when his free jazz group was complemented by several North African musicians.

== Track listing ==
All songs arranged by Shepp.

1. "Brotherhood at Ketchaoua" (Archie Shepp) – 15:55
2. "We Have Come Back" (Ted Joans, Archie Shepp) – 31:19

== Personnel ==
- Archie Shepp – tenor saxophone
- Clifford Thornton – cornet
- Grachan Moncur III – trombone
- Dave Burrell – piano
- Alan Silva – bass
- Sunny Murray – drums
- Ted Joans – poet
- Don Lee – poet
- Algerian and Tuareg musicians – shawms and percussion
