= Lisle Atkinson =

American jazz bassist (1940–2019)

Lisle Arthur Atkinson (sometimes Lysle, September 16, 1940 – March 25, 2019) was an American jazz double-bassist.

== Life and career ==
Lisle Atkinson was born in New York City on September 16, 1940. He played violin from the age of four and switched to stand-up bass at 12 years of age. He attended the Manhattan School of Music, and after graduating worked as Nina Simone's bassist from 1962 to 1966. He also worked with the New York Bass Choir and Les Spann during this time. Atkinson played with Betty Carter from 1969 to 1971, and in the 1970s worked with Kenny Burrell, George Coleman, Andrew Cyrille, Maynard Ferguson, Dizzy Gillespie, John Gordon, Jon Hendricks, Helen Humes, Hank Jones, Wynton Kelly, Howard McGhee, Horace Parlan, Hazel Scott, Norman Simmons, Frank Strozier, Billy Taylor, Clark Terry, Stanley Turrentine, and Richard Wyands.

In 1983, Atkinson formed his own group, the Neo-Bass Ensemble, which included five bassists, together with Paul H. Brown, a pianist, and Al Harewood on drums. In the 1980s Atkinson also played with Benny Carter, Lee Konitz, Grover Mitchell, Joe Newman, Dakota Staton, and Ernie Wilkins. Among his associations in the 1990s and 2000s were Barry Harris, Leroy Williams, Jeanne Lee, and Sir Charles Thompson. During the 90s, Atkinson was one of the faculty teaching at Jazzmobile on Saturdays in Harlem.

Atkinson died in New York City on March 25, 2019, at the age of 78.

== Discography ==
=== As leader ===
- Bass Contra Bass (Storyville, 1978 [1979]) with Karen Atkinson (flute), Richard Wyands (piano), Paul West (bass), Al Harewood (drums)

=== As sideman ===
With Roni Ben-Hur

- Backyard (TCB, 1995)
- Sofia's Butterfly (TCB, 1998)

With Joshua Breakstone

- No One New (Capri, 2009)
- With the Wind and the Rain (Capri, 2014)
- 2nd Avenue: The Return of the Cello Quartet (Capri, 2015)
- 88 (Capri, 2016)

With Kenny Burrell

- Prime: Live at the Downtown Room (HighNote, 1976 [2009])

With Benny Carter

- More Cookin (Jazz Heritage, 1988)
- Cookin' at Carlos I (MusicMasters, 1988 [1990])
- Harlem Renaissance (MusicMasters, 1992)

With Betty Carter

- Finally, Betty Carter (Roulette, 1969 [1975])
- Round Midnight (Roulette, 1969 [1975])
- Betty Carter at the Village Vanguard (Bet-Car/Verve, 1970)
- The Music Never Stops (Blue Engine, 1992 [2019])

With George Coleman

- Revival (Catalyst, 1976) also released as Big George

With Andrew Cyrille

- Junction (Whynot, 1976)
- Wildflowers: The New York Loft Jazz Sessions (Douglas / Casablanca, 1976) one track
- Good to Go, with a Tribute to Bu (Soul Note, 1997)
- Route de Frères (TUM, 2011)

With Albert Dailey

- The Day After the Dawn (Columbia, 1972)

With Walt Dickerson

- Peace (SteepleChase, 1975)

With Keno Duke

- Sense of Values (Strata-East, 1974)
- Crest of the Wave (Trident, 1975)

With Ryo Fukui

- Ryo Fukui in New York (Sapporo, 1999)

With John Gordon

- Step by Step (Strata-East, 1976)
- Erotica Suite (Strata-East, 1978)

With Helen Humes

- Helen Humes and the Muse All Stars (Muse, 1978 [1980])

With Jeanne Lee

- Natural Affinities (Owl, 1992)

With Shigeo Maruyama

- Sweet Lorraine (Break Time, 1990)

With Howard McGhee

- Here Comes Freddy (Sonet, 1976)
- Jazz Brothers (Jazzcraft, 1978)

With Danny Mixon

- Mixin' With Mixon (Cinderella, 1983)

With The National Jazz Ensemble

- National Jazz Ensemble Vol. 1 (Chiaroscuro, 1976)

With The New York Bass Violin Choir

- The New York Bass Violin Choir (Strata-East, 1980)

With Horace Parlan

- Frank-ly Speaking (SteepleChase, 1977)

With Norman Simmons

- Midnight Creeper (Milljac, 1979)
- I'm...The Blues (Milljac, 1981)
- Synthesis (Savant, 2002)
- In Private (Savant, 2004)

With Nina Simone

- Nina Simone at Carnegie Hall (Phillips, 1963)
- Nina Simone in Concert (Philips, 1964)
- Broadway-Blues-Ballads (Philips, 1964)
- Pastel Blues (Philips, 1965)
- Let It All Out (Philips, 1966)
- Wild Is the Wind (Phillips, 1966)
- Four Women: The Nina Simone Philips Recordings (compilation) (Verve, 2003)
- Nina Simone's Finest Hour (compilation) (Verve, 2004)

With Frank Strozier

- Remember Me (SteepleChase, 1976)
- Dance Dance (Trident, 1976)

With Richard Wyands

- Then, Here and Now (Storyville, 1978)
