= Closer (Paul Bley album) =

Studio album by Paul Bley Trio
- Released: 1966
- Recorded: December 12, 1965
- Studio: RLA Studio, New York City
- Genre: Jazz
- Length: 28:40
- Label: ESP-Disk; ESP 1021
- Producer: Paul Bley

Paul Bley chronology
Touching (1965)	Closer (1966)	Ramblin' (1966)

Closer is the seventh album led by jazz pianist Paul Bley, featuring seven compositions by Carla Bley (and one each by Bley, Annette Peacock and Ornette Coleman), recorded in 1965 and released on the ESP-Disk label.

== Reception ==
Professional ratings
Review scores
Source	Rating
Allmusic	4/5 stars
PopMatters	7/10 stars
The Penguin Guide to Jazz	4/4 stars
The Rolling Stone Jazz Record Guide	5/5 stars

Allmusic awarded the album 4 stars noting "Bley and his trio understand that with compositions of this nature, full of space and an inherent, interior-pointing lyricism, that pace is everything. And while this set clocks in at just over 29 minutes in length, the playing is so genuine and moving that it doesn't need to be any longer". PopMatters review stated "Closer is regarded as a new beginning for the jazz pianist who used to provide such elegaic keystrokes for Jim Giuffre's trio. The album is a brief tour of what it meant to be a piano trio back then... a gutsy record". The Penguin Guide to Jazz said "Closer is still a delight nearly 40 years after first release. The key track here is Carla's classic "Ida Lupino", which her former husband turn into a rolling, almost filmic narrative with layers of detail that belie the simple materials. Some have noted a continuing cross-fertilisation of ideas with Ornette Coleman on these tracks. That's harder to hear if you aren't aware of the association, but the staccato rhythms and bitten-off melodic ideas do point in that direction". Reviewing the 2008 rerelease All About Jazz stated "Bley makes a welcome return with one of his best".

== Track listing ==
All compositions by Carla Bley except as indicated

1. "Ida Lupino" - 2:55
2. "Start" - 2:21
3. "Closer" - 3:27
4. "Sideways in Mexico" - 2:55
5. "Batterie" - 3:17
6. "And Now the Queen" - 2:16
7. "Figfoot" (Paul Bley) - 3:23
8. "Crossroads" (Ornette Coleman) - 2:30
9. "Violin" - 2:57
10. "Cartoon" (Annette Peacock) - 2:16

== Personnel ==
- Paul Bley - piano
- Steve Swallow - bass
- Barry Altschul - percussion
