= Kharma Records =

Former record label specializing in jazz

Kharma Records was a short-lived jazz record label run by Dan Serro specializing in free jazz and avant-garde jazz music. Dan Serro was an avid collector as well as importer/exporter of Jazz records and his loft in downtown Manhattan that was filled with Jazz records was mentioned in several books about the Jazz loft scene including the book Loft Jazz by Michael C. Heller. Many of the label's releases are considered highly collectible today.

== Discography ==
PK	Leader	Album
1	Sunny Murray	Charred Earth
2	Frank Lowe	Doctor Too Much
3/4	Jerome Cooper	Positions 3 6 9
5	Roland Alexander	Live At The Axis
6	Burton Greene	Variations On A Coffee Machine
7	Kenny Davern	Unexpected
8	Gunter Hampel	Flying Carpet
9	Butch Morris	In Touch...But Out Of Reach
