= Touching (Paul Bley album) =

Studio album by Paul Bley Trio
- Released: 1965
- Recorded: November 5, 1965
- Studio: Copenhagen, Denmark
- Genre: Jazz
- Length: 29:27
- Label: Fontana; 888 608
- Producer: Alan Bates

Paul Bley chronology
Barrage (1964)	Touching (1965)	Closer (1965)

Touching is the sixth album led by jazz pianist Paul Bley featuring tracks recorded in Copenhagen in 1965 and released on the Danish Fontana label.

== Reception ==
Professional ratings
Review scores
Source	Rating
AllMusic	3/5 stars
The Penguin Guide to Jazz	4/4 stars

AllMusic awarded the album 3 stars stating "Although not all that memorable, the playing by the trio is at a high level and it is interesting to hear Paul Bley's mid-'60s avant-garde improvising style which offered a contrast to the more dense playing of Cecil Taylor". The Penguin Guide to Jazz said "The playing was superb... Carter and Altschul offer solid support but the focus is on the piano".

== Track listing ==
No.	Title	Writer(s)	Length
1.	"Start"	Carla Bley	8:19
2.	"Touching"	Annette Peacock	8:06
3.	"Pablo"	Paul Bley	5:50
4.	"Both"	Annette Peacock	4:24
5.	"Mazatalan"	Paul Bley	5:15
6.	"Cartoon"	Annette Peacock	6:44

== Personnel ==
- Paul Bley - piano
- Kent Carter - bass
- Barry Altschul - drums
