= The Loop (Andrew Cyrille album) =

Studio album by Andrew Cyrille
- Released: 1978
- Recorded: July 1978
- Studio: Ictus Studio, Pistoia, Italy
- Genre: Jazz, percussion music
- Label: ICTUS Records; 0009
- Producer: Andrea Centazzo

Andrew Cyrille chronology
Junction (1976)	The Loop (1978)	Metamusicians' Stomp (1978)

The Loop is a solo album by drummer Andrew Cyrille. It was recorded in July 1978 at Ictus Studio in Pistoia, Italy, and was released later that year by ICTUS Records.

The track titled "The News," which would reappear in an ensemble format on Cyrille's 2021 album The News, features unique sounds produced by a snare drum covered with a newspaper and played with brushes. The composition called "The Loop" can also be heard on the 2004 album Duo Palindrome 2002 Vol. 1, as a duo performed by Cyrille and Anthony Braxton. Cyrille commented: "The loop, to me, is like a figure-8 laying on its side, like the infinity sign. You go back and you go forth, back and forth. It goes, DINK-duht-duht-DANK, DINK-duht-duht-DANK. Then on top of that, I improvise a rhythm with the drumsticks on the drumset, stating the basic rhythm on the hi-hat and bass drum, with that feeling of looping."

== Reception ==
Professional ratings
Review scores
Source	Rating
AllMusic	3/5 stars
The Rolling Stone Jazz Record Guide	4/5 stars

Author W. C. Bamberger wrote: "There are two trap set solo pieces here, 'Excerpt from Spencyrspell,' and 'The Loop.' On both, Cyrille is lightning fast, crisp and unrelenting, but strict time isn't much of a concern. Any section of the 'Suite' could stand as a brilliant jazz solo, but episodes are broken with stops and starts, accelerations and brakings; strung together the pieces are full of contrast, swerving, endlessly inventive--an encyclopedic working-through of the drum set's possible colors. 'The Loop' has more of a repeated pattern, like a rhythmic theme. Cyrille bats this around, stress tests it for elasticity."

Coda's Bill Shoemaker commented: "Only a consummate percussionist like Andrew Cyrille could take the solo format to such incandescent and sheerly musical ends... For anyone concerned with percussion, this is an album worth going to lengths to hear."

== Track listing ==
All compositions by Andrew Cyrille. Track timings not provided.

1. "Excerpt From Spencyrspell"
2. "500 B.C."
3. "Some Sun"
4. "The Loop"
5. "The News"
6. "Classical Retention"

== Personnel ==
- Andrew Cyrille – drums, percussion
