= Mu (album) =

Studio album by Don Cherry
- Released: 1969 and 1970
- Recorded: August 22, 1969
- Studios: Studio Saravah, Paris
- Genre: Free jazz
- Labels: BYG Records; 529.301; 529.331
- Producers: Jean Georgakarakos, Jean Luc Young

Part 2 cover

Mu, First Part and Mu, Second Part, is a pair of studio albums by American jazz musician Don Cherry. The albums were recorded in a single session on August 22, 1969, at Studio Saravah in Paris with drummer Ed Blackwell, and were released by BYG Records as part of their Actuel series in 1969 (First Part) and 1970 (Second Part). In 1971, BYG released both parts together as a single box set. Mu was one of the first efforts in what would come to be known as world music.

In December 1977, Cherry and Blackwell presented a concert at New York University called "Mu, Part Three."

== Reception ==
Professional ratings
Review scores
Source	Rating
AllMusic	4/5 stars
The Penguin Guide to Jazz	4/4 stars
The Rolling Stone Jazz Record Guide	3/5 stars
The Virgin Encyclopedia of Jazz	4/5 stars

In a review for AllMusic, Brian Olewnick wrote: "This classic pair of recordings... captures Don Cherry near the height of his global quest to absorb as much music as possible from different cultures and funnel it back through his jazz sensibility. It's one of the earliest, and most successful, experiments in what would later come to be known as world music... The Mu sessions have long held legendary status and it's not difficult to hear why. Highly recommended."

The authors of The Penguin Guide to Jazz Recordings called the recordings "an exhilarating musical experience," and stated: "This one never fails to delight... [Cherry's] range is astonishing, everything from bright New Orleans vamps and marches to African songs, folksy Americana to totally free passages."

Robert Palmer, writing for The New York Times, noted that the albums "were of real importance. They announced a new, world-embracing esthetic for jazz, for while they included improvising in a Coleman-inspired vein, they also reached out to include rhythm patterns, scales and instruments from Africa, Asia, Latin America and the Pacific."

Author Ekkehard Jost commented: "Stripped of all frills and governed solely by the creative will and musical experience of Cherry as 'agent,' and the sensitivity of Blackwell as 'reagent,' these duo recordings afford a unique view of the quintessence of Cherry's music."

== Track listings ==
All music composed by Don Cherry.

=== First Part ===
1. "Brilliant Action" – 8:50
2. "Omejelo" – 7:25
3. "Total Vibration (Part 1)" – 3:00
4. "Total Vibration (Part 2)" – 6:00
5. "Sun of the East" – 7:30
6. "Terrestrial Beings" – 4:42

=== Second Part ===
1. "The Mysticism of my Sound" – 4:00
2. "Medley: Dollar Brand / Spontaneous Composing / Exert, Man on the Moon" – 3:15
3. "Bamboo Night" – 6:07
4. "Teo-Teo-Can" – 6:30
5. "Smiling Faces Going Places" – 5:00
6. "Psycho-Drama" – 2:45
7. "Medley: Theme Albert Heath / Theme Dollar Brand / Baby Rest, Time For..." – 3:55

== Personnel ==
- Don Cherry – trumpet, piano, flute, voice, bells, percussion
- Ed Blackwell – drums, percussion, bells
