= Skillfulness (album) =

Studio album by Alan Silva
- Released: 1969
- Recorded: November 1968
- Studio: New York City
- Genre: Free jazz
- Label: ESP-Disk; ESP 1091

Alan Silva chronology
Skillfulness (1969)	Luna Surface (1969)

Reissue cover

Skillfulness (also released as Skillfullness) is an album by multi-instrumentalist Alan Silva. It was recorded in November 1968 in New York City, and was released in 1969 by ESP-Disk. On the album, Silva is joined by flutist Becky Friend, pianist Dave Burrell, pianist and organist Mike Ephron, vibraphonist Karl Berger, and percussionists Lawrence Cooke, Barry Altschul, and Mario Pavone. The recording was made shortly before Silva moved to Europe.

According to Silva, the album was based on the notion of "skillful means" (Upaya) as expressed in the Buddhist Lotus Sutra. The recording contains two tracks: "Skillfullness" for three musicians, and "Solestrial" for an expanded group, with Silva conducting. Silva later stated that "Solestrial" was his first recorded attempt to conduct an improvisation, and acknowledged the influence of Sun Ra, with whom he had worked, in this regard. (The track can be viewed as a forerunner of Butch Morris's "conductions.") He also credited John Coltrane's influence, commenting: "My work was based on John Coltrane's Ascension. The first ten minutes of Ascension, before the solos start, were revolutionary. I always thought if he'd gone on with just the collective improvisation he'd have got it. So I felt he left that to me to do!"

== Reception ==
Professional ratings
Review scores
Source	Rating
AllMusic	4/5 stars
The Penguin Guide to Jazz	3/4 stars

In a review for AllMusic, Dan Warburton stated that "Skillfullness" "gives the lie to the idea that free jazz in New York in 1968 was all about blowing the wall down," and noted that on "Solestrial," "Silva was able to summon extraordinary solo performances from his musicians... without losing sight of the work's overall architecture."

Regarding "Skillfullness," the authors of the Penguin Guide to Jazz Recordings commented: "For all the hippy fantasies of rock and the space operas emerging on the fringes of jazz, nothing of the time quite captures its spirit – ethereal but grounded in sophisticated intelligence and high technical skill – quite as well." Concerning "Solestrial," they wrote: "The quality of concentration and playing from the group... is staggering." They concluded: "It's a brief record... but an essential one."

== Track listing ==
Composed by Alan Silva.

1. "Skillfullness" – 23:45
2. "Solestrial" – 15:02

== Personnel ==
- Alan Silva – violin, cello, piano, conductor
- Becky Friend – flute, vocals
- Karl Berger – vibraphone
- Dave Burrell – piano (track 2)
- Mike Ephron – piano, organ (track 2)
- Lawrence Cooke – percussion (track 2)
- Barry Altschul (credited as "Barry") – percussion (track 2)
- Mario Pavone (credited as "Mario") – percussion (track 2)
