= Junction (album) =

Live album by Andrew Cyrille
- Released: 1976
- Recorded: May 23, 1976, and June 12, 1976
- Venue: Studio Rivbea, New York City and Wollman Auditorium, Columbia University, New York City
- Genre: Jazz
- Label: Institute of Percussive Studies; IPS ST003

Andrew Cyrille chronology
| Celebration (1975) | Junction (1976) | The Loop (1978) |

Junction is a live album by drummer Andrew Cyrille. It was recorded in May and June 1976 at two different venues in New York City, and was released later that year by the Institute of Percussive Studies. On the album, Cyrille is joined by members of the band Māōnō: saxophonist David S. Ware, trumpeter Ted Daniel, and bassist Lisle Atkinson. Liner notes were provided by Stanley Crouch. In 1977, the album was reissued by the Japanese label Whynot with different track names and sequence, and with the two shorter tracks replaced by different material from the same concerts.

== Reception ==
Professional ratings
Review scores
| Source | Rating |
|---|---|
| AllMusic | 3/5 stars |

Henry Kuntz, writing for Bells, suggested that, on Junction, Cyrille paid tribute to fellow drummer Sunny Murray. He commented: "You can hear it on the title track; also on 'Okurinomo,' a slow, high-pitched, ritual-like chanted tune, that evokes from Cyrille the subtly repetitive wave-like motions... that have come to mark the work of Murray. Interesting that this should happen as Cyrille's playing moves more in the direction of ritual... for in that type of structure, repetition is frequently used to great dramatic and evocative effect. I doubt that Cyrille's playing on these pieces is deliberately (ritually) derivative... but is likely more a felt improvisational response to the nature of his own compositions – the emotional demands of the moment. If Junction offers a bit less of Cyrille’s usual all-encompassing drum vision, it is a moving and, on its own terms, important musical statement."

== Track listing ==
All compositions by Andrew Cyrille.

1. "Junction" – 19:03 (in three movements: "Do You Know Where '1' Is?"; "Do You Know Where '2' Is?"; "Connaturally")
2. "Sidi Ahmed-Sidi" – 8:47
3. "Ginakus 'M'" – 2:47
4. "Okurimono (Gift From Japan)" – 21:14
- Tracks 2 and 4 recorded on May 23, 1976, at Studio Rivbea in New York City. Tracks 1 and 3 recorded on June 12, 1976, at Wollman Auditorium, Columbia University, in New York City.

== Personnel ==
- Andrew Cyrille – drums, bells, gongs, kalimba, voice
- David S. Ware – tenor saxophone
- Ted Daniel – trumpet, flugelhorn, effects
- Lisle Atkinson – bass
