= Some Other Stuff =

Studio album by Grachan Moncur III
- Released: January/February 1965
- Recorded: July 6, 1964
- Studio: Van Gelder Studio; Englewood Cliffs, NJ
- Genre: Avant-garde jazz, post-bop
- Length: 40:47
- Label: Blue Note; BLP 4177
- Producer: Alfred Lion

Grachan Moncur III chronology
Evolution (1963)	Some Other Stuff (1965)	New Africa (1969)

Some Other Stuff is the second album by American trombonist Grachan Moncur III, recorded on July 6, 1964 and released on Blue Note early the following year. The quintet features saxophonist Wayne Shorter, and rhythm section Herbie Hancock, Cecil McBee and Tony Williams.

== Background ==
=== Compositions ===
According to Moncur, "Gnostic" is a free jazz piece "which eliminates a pulsating meter", representing the achievement of salvation through the expression of knowledge and wisdom. "Thandiwa" (Zulu: "Beloved One") is the least experimental track of the album. "The Twins", a portrayal of his twin brothers, is built off only one chord; he considered the rhythm the focal point of the composition. "Nomadic" is centered on a drum solo by Tony Williams.

=== Release history ===
It was remastered by Rudy Van Gelder for CD in 2008.

== Reception ==
Professional ratings
Review scores
Source	Rating
AllMusic	4.5/5 stars
Down Beat	4.5/5 stars
The Penguin Guide to Jazz Recordings	3.5/4 stars

The AllMusic review by Scott Yanow states, "Grachan Moncur III was one of the top trombonists of the jazz avant-garde in the 1960s although he had only a few chances to lead his own record sessions. This 1964 set (which has been reissued on CD) was one of his finest... None of the compositions caught on but the strong and very individual improvising of the young musicians is enough of a reason to acquire the advanced music."

== Track listing ==
All tracks are written by Grachan Moncur III.

Side 1
No.	Title	Length
1.	"Gnostic"	11:46
2.	"Thandiwa"	8:21

Side 2
No.	Title	Length
1.	"The Twins"	12:55
2.	"Nomadic"	7:43

== Personnel ==
=== Musicians ===
- Grachan Moncur III – trombone
- Wayne Shorter – tenor saxophone
- Herbie Hancock – piano
- Cecil McBee – bass
- Tony Williams – drums

=== Technical personnel ===
- Alfred Lion – producer
- Rudy Van Gelder – recording engineer
- Reid Miles – design, photography
- Don Heckman – liner notes
