= Metamusicians' Stomp =

Studio album by Andrew Cyrille & Maono
- Released: 1978
- Recorded: September 1978
- Genre: Jazz
- Length: 40:24
- Label: Black Saint
- Producer: Giacomo Pellicciotti

Andrew Cyrille chronology
The Loop (1978)	Metamusicians' Stomp (1978)	Nuba (1979)

Metamusicians' Stomp is an album by American jazz drummer Andrew Cyrille, recorded in 1978 for the Italian Black Saint label.

== Reception ==
Professional ratings
Review scores
Source	Rating
AllMusic	4/5 stars
DownBeat	4/5 stars
The Penguin Guide to Jazz Recordings	3.5/4 stars
The Rolling Stone Jazz Record Guide	4/5 stars
Tom Hull – on the Web	B+

The AllMusic review by Scott Yanow stated: "This intriguing set gives listeners an early glimpse of the great avant-garde tenor saxophonist David Ware, who is well featured with drummer Andrew Cyrille's quartet... This is a stimulating program that is easily recommended". The authors of The Penguin Guide to Jazz Recordings awarded the album 3½ stars, and wrote that it demonstrates Cyrille's "increasing interest in an Africanized language for jazz..." They stated that what the album seems to suggest is that "the further jazz goes back towards its point of ancestral departure, the more completely it is itself."

Nate Chinen, writing for The New York Times, called it an "earthy and exploratory album, featuring a captivating young tenor saxophonist, David S. Ware, alongside the slashing trumpeter Ted Daniel." In an article for the Akbank Sanat web site, Cem Kayiran commented: "With its rich rhythmical structures and highlighting of every song with a different feeling, Metamusicians' Stomp is an album that every free jazz fan can happily get lost in."

DownBeat assigned the album 4 stars. Reviewer Art Lange wrote, "Both emotionally and structurally this music is a long way from Cyrille's involvement with the volcanic contexts ol Cecil Taylor's sound spectrum: nevertheless it reveals a portion of the depth of his multifaceted musical personality. and as such can be highly recommended".

== Track listing ==
All compositions by Andrew Cyrille except as indicated

1. "Metamusicians' Stomp" - 6:41
2. "My Ship" (Ira Gershwin, Kurt Weill) - 7:05
3. "5-4-3-2" - 4:54
4. "Spiegelgasse 14: Reflections + Restaurants/The Park/Flight" - 21:44

- Recorded at Ricordi Studios in Milano, Italy in September 1978

== Personnel ==
- Andrew Cyrille - drums, percussion, foot
- Ted Daniel - trumpet, flugelhorn, wood flute, foot
- David S. Ware - flute, tenor saxophone, foot
- Nick DiGeronimo - bass, foot
