= Earl Freeman =

US jazz double bassist

- Born: Earl Albert Freeman; March 11, 1931; Oakland, California, US
- Died: July 25, 1994 (aged 63)
- Genres: Jazz, free jazz, avant-garde jazz
- Occupation: Musician
- Instruments: Double bass, electric bass, harp, flute, percussion, piano

Earl Freeman (March 11, 1931 – July 25, 1994) was an American free jazz multi-instrumentalist, composer, poet, and artist best known for his work during the 1960s and 70s with Gong, Noah Howard, Sunny Murray, Archie Shepp, and Clifford Thornton.

== Biography ==
Freeman was born in Oakland, California, and began playing double bass in junior high school. While a teenager, he was drafted into the US Army, and served in the Korean War, where he lost a lung after being stabbed with a bayonet.

n 1968, Freeman moved to Paris, where he joined the community of musicians and artists who lived there. During his time in France, he became known as an eccentric figure who appeared in public dressed in an aviator helmet and glasses, earning the nickname "Goggles." He performed and recorded with Archie Shepp, Sunny Murray, Clifford Thornton, Arthur Jones, and the band Gong, and also went to Algeria with Shepp, Cal Massey, Don Byas, and Steve McCall to make a film.

During the early 1970s, he moved to New York City, where he became part of the emerging loft jazz scene, joining a collective improvisation group known as The Music Ensemble, which included musicians such as Billy Bang, Daniel Carter, Dewey Johnson, Noah Howard, and William Parker. In 1975, he assembled a large ensemble called the Universal Jazz Symphonette, and recorded an original work titled Sound Craft '75: Fantasy for Orchestra, which featured some of the earliest appearances on record of William Parker and Raphe Malik.

The 1980s saw Freeman moving back to California, where he recorded with Sonny Simmons, then returning to New York City, where he formed the Freestyle Band, a trio with clarinetist Henry P. Warner and hand drummer Philip Spigner. The group's sole, self-titled album was released by Adeyeme Productions in 1984, and was reissued in expanded form by NoBusiness Records in 2012. During the remainder of the 1980s until his death, he spent time in both New York City and San Francisco, often living a transient life and staying with friends.

Throughout his life, Freeman was also active as a poet and visual artist, publishing his work in small, short-run editions, and giving copies to friends. In 2021, Wry Press and 50 Miles of Elbow Room published a collection of Freeman's poetry and drawings. Writers Pierre Crépon and David Grundy described the book as "a fascinating contribution to our sense of the multi-disciplinary undercurrents of the jazz avant garde."

Freeman died in 1994, and is buried in the Riverside National Cemetery in Riverside, California.

== Legacy ==
Double bassist William Parker recalled that Freeman "was always there, musically, when you needed him," and reflected: "He was almost like a poet on the bass, like a painter, someone that would make a snapshot of the fire to cool it down in a way and bring out the elements of beauty in the fire." Parker's 1996 album Compassion Seizes Bed-Stuy features a composition titled "Goggles," dedicated to Freeman. Drummer Roger Baird stated: "It was always such a pleasure to play with Earl because he was so tuned in to the cosmos. He always had that thread going and there was never any hesitation to his approach."

== Discography ==
=== As leader ===
- The Universal Jazz Symphonette: Sound Craft '75 Fantasy For Orchestra (Anima, 1975)

=== As co-leader ===
- The Freestyle Band (Adeyeme, 1984; NoBusiness, 2012)

=== As sideman ===
With Claude Delcloo and Arthur Jones

- Africanasia (BYG, 1969)

With Friendship Next of Kin Featuring Selwyn Lissack

- Facets Of The Univers (Goody, 1971)

With Gong

- Magick Brother (BYG, 1969 [1970])

With Noah Howard

- Patterns (Altsax, 1973)
- Live at the Village Vanguard (Freedom, 1975)

With Sunny Murray

- Homage to Africa (BYG, 1969 [1970])

With Mike Osborne

- Shapes (Future Music Distribution, 1972 [1995])

With Archie Shepp

- Yasmina, a Black Woman (BYG, 1969)
- Black Gipsy (America, 1969)
- Archie Shepp & Philly Joe Jones (America, 1969 [1970])
- Pitchin Can (America, 1969 [1970]) (one track)

With Sonny Simmons

- Global Jungle (Deal With It, 1982 [1990])

With Kenneth Terroade

- Love Rejoice (BYG, 1969)

With Clifford Thornton

- Ketchaoua (BYG, 1969)

With François Tusques

- Alors Nosferatu Combina Un Plan Ingénieux (Cacophonic, 1969 [2019])

== Writings and artwork ==
- Freeman, Earl (2021). Poems & Drawings Wry Press and 50 Miles of Elbow Room.
