= An Even Break (Never Give a Sucker) =

Studio album by Sunny Murray
- Released: 1970
- Recorded: November 22, 1969
- Studio: Studio Saravah, Paris
- Genre: Free jazz
- Length: 27:16
- Label: BYG Actuel; 529.332
- Producer: Jean Georgakarakos, Jean-Luc Young

Sunny Murray chronology
Homage to Africa (1970)	An Even Break (Never Give a Sucker) (1970)	Charred Earth (1977)

An Even Break (Never Give a Sucker) is an album by American free jazz drummer Sunny Murray. It was recorded in Paris in November 1969, and released on the BYG Actuel label in 1970. On the album, Murray is joined by saxophonists Byard Lancaster and Kenneth Terroade, and bassist Malachi Favors.

In 2002, Fuel 2000 reissued An Even Break (Never Give a Sucker) along with Murray's 1970 BYG album Sunshine on a single disc.

== Reception ==
Professional ratings
Review scores
Source	Rating
AllMusic	3/5 stars
The Penguin Guide to Jazz	3/4 stars

In a review for AllMusic, Thom Jurek wrote that the album "showcases Murray's brand of fiery, spiritual free jazz grooveology... Less than half an hour in length, it features four mid-length performances that amount to free jazz improvisation. It's compelling, and holds the listener's interest for its passion and intrigue, but this was not a band per se and the rough edges certainly show."

The authors of The Penguin Guide to Jazz awarded the album 3 stars, referring to it as "Murray's finest hour of the fast-disappearing '60s."

== Track listing ==
All compositions by Sunny Murray.

1. "An Even Break (Never Give A Sucker)" – 7:45
2. "Giblets - Part 12" – 7:21
3. "Complete Affection" – 7:15
4. "Invisible Blues" – 5:25

== Personnel ==
- Byard Lancaster – alto saxophone, soprano saxophone, bass clarinet, flute
- Kenneth Terroade – tenor saxophone, flute
- Malachi Favors – bass
- Sunny Murray – drums, balafon, voice

== Production ==
- Jean Georgakarakos, Jean-Luc Young – producers
- Daniel Vallencien – engineer
