= The Freestyle Band =

Studio album by The Freestyle Band
- Released: 1984; 2012
- Recorded: 1984
- Studio: Sorcerer Sound, New York City
- Genre: Free jazz
- Label: Adeyeme Productions; NoBusiness Records
- Producer: Marie C. Noto (original release); Danas Mikailionis and Valerij Anosov (reissue)

The Freestyle Band is an album by the collective free jazz trio of the same name, featuring clarinetist Henry P. Warner, double bassist and pianist Earl Freeman, and hand drummer Philip Spigner. The group's sole release, it was recorded during 1984 at Sorcerer Sound in New York City, and was initially released on vinyl the same year by Adeyeme Productions Unlimited with cover art by Freeman. In 2012, it was reissued on CD with the title Freestyle Band by NoBusiness Records. The reissue contains two additional tracks, along with extensive notes by Ed Hazell, plus photos and reproductions of flyers.

== Reception ==
Professional ratings
Review scores
Source	Rating
All About Jazz	3.5/5 stars
The Free Jazz Collective	4/5 stars
Tom Hull – on the Web	B+

In a review for All About Jazz, John Sharpe described the album as "another fascinating artifact helping to fill in a few more of the blanks on the NYC scene at the tail end of the loft era."

The Free Jazz Collective's Martin Schray called the album a "gem," and noted that the sound of the group is "unlike anything you have ever heard before." He stated: "there are hand drums... that... sound like an African war rhythm. Even more confusing is the bass guitar... You can hear the primordial soup bubbling. Above the brew flutters a clarinet... The blues is whispering its mournful melody. Is there communication or is everybody playing independently of each other?"

Critic Tom Hull commented: "Spigner's hand drums set up a nice homely vibe that Warner's clarinet sometimes flows with and sometimes cuts against; Freeman plays electric bass and piano, most often against the current, just to keep it all interesting."

Ken Waxman of JazzWord remarked: "Jumbling the stridency of Energy Music with the sonic circumspection of minimalism, the textures of these all-original compositions were both ahead of their time and behind them... there are many instances when each man sounds as if he's playing parallel yet unaffiliated lines. Yet somehow through sequence repetition and bravura tone bending, cohesion is achieved."

Writing for Point of Departure, Bobby Hill called the album "a fine example of music that's been underground for too long," stating that it "has a searching freshness that belies its age." He noted that Freeman's "extraterrestrial approach to his instrument is reminiscent of the deep, rubbery sound made famous by Funkadelic's Bootsy Collins, which he successfully brings to an avant, improvisational-based setting."

In a Paris Transatlantic review of the 2012 CD release, Clifford Allen called the trio "one of the most distinctive ensembles to emerge from New York's DIY scene," and wrote: "This reissue is a testament to how much differentiation existed within loft jazz, and it's great to have the opportunity to spread the Freestyle Band's gospel once again."

== Original LP track listing ==
Track timings not provided.

Side A

1. "Dr Nuñez"
2. "The Roach Approach"

Side B

1. "Pelican"

== CD reissue track listing ==
1. "Dr. Nunez" – 4:13
2. "The Roach Approach" – 13:04
3. "Beef Thrust" – 11:43
4. "Pelican" – 21:06
5. "Bird Knows!" – 10:09

== Personnel ==
- Henry P. Warner – B♭ clarinet, alto clarinet
- Earl Freeman – electric bass, piano
- Philip Spigner – hand drums
