= Dexterity (song) =

1947 jazz composition by Charlie Parker

"Dexterity" is a 1947 jazz composition by saxophonist Charlie Parker, which has become a jazz standard. It has since been covered by artists such as the Art Ensemble of Chicago for the album Message to Our Folks in 1969, Roy Hargrove for Parker's Mood) and Alex Riel for the album Riel Atin'). In B-flat major, the tune is based on the changes to Gershwin's "I Got Rhythm", composed for the Broadway musical Girl Crazy in 1930. The B section to the tune includes the whole of the ensemble.
