= John Gordon (trombonist) =

American jazz trombonist (1939–2003)

- Born: May 30, 1939; New York City, New York, U.S.
- Died: November 27, 2003 (aged 64)
- Genres: Jazz
- Instruments: Trombone

John Bernard Gordon (May 30, 1939 – November 27, 2003) was an American jazz trombonist.

== Early life and education ==
Gordon was born in New York City. He studied at Juilliard School and played with Buddy Johnson and Ray Draper in the 1950s.

== Career ==
Gordon worked with Lionel Hampton in 1961 and 1962 and with Lloyd Price and Sam Rivers later in the 1960s. In the 1970s, he played with Charles Tolliver, Clark Terry, Count Basie, Howard McGhee, and Frank Foster, as well as with Hampton again; he continued working with Hampton until 1989. He also led his own ensembles in the late 1970s, with sidemen including Tolliver, Roland Alexander, Lisle Atkinson, Stanley Cowell, and Andrew Cyrille.

After leaving Hampton, Gordon played in Al Grey's ensemble, Trombone Summit, and founded a group called Trombones Incorporated with Fred Joiner. When Joiner left the group in the early 1990s, Gordon became its leader and changed its name to Trombones Unlimited. In the 1990s he also played with Slide Hampton, Josh Roseman, Lafayette Harris, Martin Winder, Curtis Fuller, and Thilo Berg.

Gordon worked for several decades as a session musician for recordings and has also performed in pit orchestras for Broadway musicals.

== Death ==
John Gordon died on November 27, 2003, at the age of 64.

== Sources ==
- Gary W. Kennedy, "John Gordon". The New Grove Dictionary of Jazz. 2nd edition, ed. Barry Kernfeld.
