= François Tusques =

French jazz pianist (born 1938)

François Tusques (born January 27, 1938, in Paris, France) is a French jazz pianist. Tusques played a significant role in the emergence of a community of free jazz musicians in France.

== Discography ==
- Free Jazz, with Bernard Vitet, Beb Guérin, Michel Portal, François Jeanneau, 1965.
- La Maison Fille du Soleil, with Don Cherry, Beb Guérin, Jean-François Jenny-Clark, 1965.
- Le Nouveau Jazz, with Barney Wilen, Jean-François Jenny-Clark, Aldo Romano, 1967.
- François Tusques – La Reine des Vampires - Eddy Gaumont plays violin, 1967
- Sunny Murray, concert live with l'Acoustical Swing Unit, 1968.
- Big Chief, Acoustical Swing Unit, 1969.
- Piano Dazibao, 1970 - Futura Ger 14
- The Panther and the Lash, with Clifford Thornton, Beb Guérin, Noel McGhee, 1970.
- Dazibao n°2, 1971 - Futura Ger32
- Intercommunal Music with Sunny Murray, Alan Silva, Beb Guérin, Steve Potts, Alan Shorter, Bob Reid, Louis Armfield, 1971.
- Répression, with Colette Magny, 1972.
- Dansons Avec Les Travailleurs Immigrés, with Michel Marre, Claude Marre, Carlos Andreu, Denis Levaillant, 1974.
- Ça Branle Dans la Manche, with Serge Utgé-Royo, 1975.
- Le piano préparé, 1977.
- Après la marée noire - Vers une Musique Bretonne Nouvelle with Jean-Louis Le Vallégant, Gaby Kerdoncuff, Philippe Le Strat, Tanguy Ledore, Ramadolf, Michel Marre, Samuel Ateba, Carlos Andreu, Jo Maka, Kilikus, 1979.
- Poemas de Federico Garcia Lorca with Violeta Ferrer, 1980.
- Le Musichien, with Carlos Andreu, Ramadolf, Kilikus, Sylvain Kassap, Jean-Jacques Avenel, Yegba Likoba, Bernard Vitet, Danièle Dumas, Sam Ateba, Tanguy Le Doré, Jean-Louis Le Vallégant, Philippe Le Strat, 1983.
- Génération, music for the documentary by Daniel Edinger, 1988.
- Le Jardin des Délices, 1992.
- Blue Phédre, 1996.
- Blues Suite with Noel McGhie et Denis Colin, 1998.
- Arc Voltaic, with Carlos Andreu, Didier Petit, Denis Colin, Danièle Dumas, 2003.
- Topolitologie, with Noel McGhie, 2010.
- Near the Oasis, with Sonny Simmons, 2011.
- L'étang Change (Mais Les Poissons Sont Toujours Là), 2012
- La Jungle Du Douanier Rousseau, with Alexandra Grimal, Sylvain Guérineau, 2014.
- Le Fond De L'Air, with Pablo Cueco, Myrtha Pozzi, 2014.
- Le Chant Du Jubjub, with Isabel Juanpera, Itaru Oki, Claude Parle, 2015.
