= BYG Records =

French jazz record label

- Founded: 1967
- Founder: Jean Georgakarakos; Jean-Luc Young; Fernand Boruso
- Defunct: 1973
- Genre: Free jazz, Avant-garde jazz
- Country of origin: France
- Location: Paris

BYG Records was a French record label known for the Actuel series specializing in free jazz. However, the label released a handful of non-jazz recordings by artists such as Musica Elettronica Viva, Terry Riley, Freedom and Gong.

== History ==
BYG Records was founded in March 1967 by Jean Georgakarakos, Jean-Luc Young, and Fernand Boruso. The name of the label was formed from the initial letters of the founders' surnames. Georgakarakos had previously established himself as a record distributor and importer, while Young worked for Barclay Records and Boruso for Saravah, the record label formed by Pierre Barouh.

The label invited American free jazz musicians to Paris to record in the summer of 1969, a time when they were receiving little support or attention in the United States. Many of these musicians were already overseas at the time, having appeared at the Pan-African Music Festival in Algiers in July 1969. (Jazz photographer Jacques Bisceglia was largely responsible for connecting the label and musicians, and the "B" in BYG is often wrongly held to refer to Bisceglia.) The resulting albums are an important repository of free jazz recordings from the period.

BYG Actuel was also responsible for organising the Actuel festival, which took place in late October 1969 in the small Belgian town of Amougies. The festival was initially intended to take place in or near Paris, but was banned by the French authorities. It featured many leading exponents of progressive rock, such as Frank Zappa, Pink Floyd, Captain Beefheart, Soft Machine, Ten Years After, Yes and The Nice. The festival was a popular success, with around 20,000 visitors over five nights, but it was a financial failure. In July 1970, Georgakarakos organised the Popanalia festival at Biot on the French Riviera, but this was also financially unsuccessful. By 1972, financial problems had plagued BYG to the point where it virtually went underground. Georgakarakos and Young later formed their own record labels, Celluloid (Georgakarakos) and Charly (Young). In 2002 a compilation album featuring the best of the label, JazzActuel: a collection of avant garde/free jazz/psychedelia from the BYG/Actuel catalogue of 1969–1971, was released by Charly (as a 3-CD set) and Get Back Records of Italy (as a 6-LP set). The collection was curated by Thurston Moore of Sonic Youth and journalist Byron Coley.

== Discography ==
(Actuel series releases)

Catalogue number	Artist	Album
529301	Cherry, Don	Mu - First Part
529302	Art Ensemble of Chicago	A Jackson in Your House
529303	Murray, Sunny	Homage to Africa
529304	Shepp, Archie	Yasmina, a Black Woman
529305	Gong	Magick Brother
529306	Jones, Arthur	Africanasia
529307	Puig, Michel	Stigmates
529308	Greene, Burton	Aquariana
529309	Lyons, Jimmy	Other Afternoons
529310	Jack, Alan	Bluesy Mind [never issued]
529311	Shepp, Archie	Poem for Malcolm
529312	Silva, Alan	Luna Surface
529313	Bley, Paul	Ramblin'
529314	Acting Trio	Acting Trio
529315	Braxton, Anthony	B-Xo/N-0-1-4-7a
529316	Cyrille, Andrew	What About?
529317	Kuhn, Joachim	Sounds of Feelings
529318	Shepp, Archie	Blasé
529319	Coursil, Jacques	Way Ahead
529320	Burrell, Dave	Echo
529321	Moncur III, Grachan	New Africa
529322	Terroade, Kenneth	Love Rejoice
529323	Thornton, Clifford	Ketchaoua
529324	Ame Son	Catalyse
529325	Freedom	Freedom at Last
529326	Musica Elettronica Viva	The Sound Pool
529327	Marietan, Pierre & Terry Riley	Germ-Keyboard Study 2
529328	Art Ensemble of Chicago	Message to Our Folks
529329	Art Ensemble of Chicago	Reese and the Smooth Ones
529330	Burrell, Dave	La Vie de Bohème
529331	Cherry, Don	Mu - Second Part
529332	Murray, Sunny	An Even Break (Never Give a Sucker)
529333	Moncur, Grachan	Aco Dei De Madrugada
529334	Redman, Dewey	Tarik
529335	Musica Elettronica Viva	Leave the City
529336	Wright, Frank	One for John
529337	Sharrock, Sonny	Monkey-Pockie-Boo
529338	Shepp, Archie	And The Full Moon Ensemble Live In Antibes Vol. 1
529339	Shepp, Archie	And The Full Moon Ensemble Live In Antibes Vol. 2
529340	Sun Ra	The Solar-Myth Approach Vol. 2
529341	Sun Ra	The Solar-Myth Approach Vol. 1
529342-4	Silva, Alan	Seasons
529345	Allen, Daevid	Banana Moon
529346	Kuhn, Joachim	Paris is Wonderful
529347	Braxton, Anthony	This Time...
529348	Murray, Sunny	Sunshine
529349	Coursil, Jacques	Black Suite
529350	Jones, Arthur	Scorpio
529351	Shepp, Archie	Live at the Pan-African Festival
529352	Lacy, Steve	Moon
529353	Gong	Camembert Electrique

(Pop Blues series releases)

Catalogue number	Artist	Album
529501	The Aynsley Dunbar Retaliation	Watchin' Chain

== Website ==
BYG Records launched its own website in 2020: http://www.bygrecords.com/

== See also ==
- List of record labels
