= Bernard Vitet =

French instrumentalist (1934 – 2013)

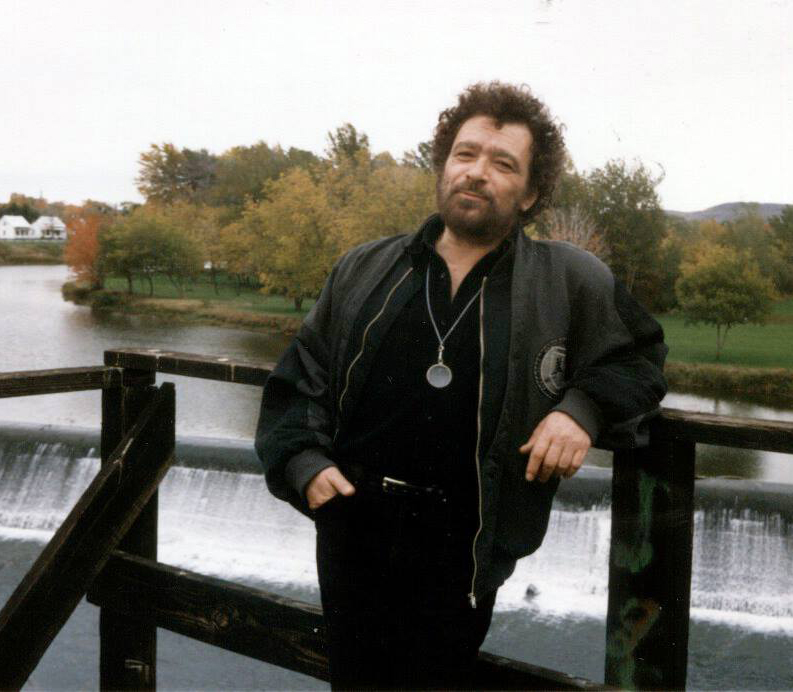
Image of Bernard Vitet

Bernard Vitet (26 May 1934 – 3 July 2013) was a French trumpeter, multi-instrumentist and composer, co-founder of the first free jazz band in France (1964) together with François Tusques, Michel Portal Unit (1972) and Un Drame Musical Instantané with Jean-Jacques Birgé and Francis Gorgé in 1976.

== Early life and career ==
Born in Paris, France, Vitet was involved in the early fusion of jazz and contemporary music with Bernard Parmegiani and Jean-Louis Chautemps. In the 1960s, he accompanied singers such as Serge Gainsbourg, Barbara, Yves Montand, Claude François, Brigitte Bardot, Marianne Faithfull, Colette Magny, and Brigitte Fontaine. He played with jazz musicians such as Lester Young, Archie Shepp, Anthony Braxton, Don Cherry, Chet Baker, the Art Ensemble of Chicago, Steve Lacy, Gato Barbieri, Jean-Luc Ponty, and Martial Solal. In his early years, he performed with Django Reinhardt, Gus Viseur, Eric Dolphy, and Albert Ayler.

Under his own name he recorded Surprise-partie avec Bernard Vitet (on trombone!), La Guêpe on texts by Francis Ponge, Mehr Licht!, and about 200 other records with the aforementioned, plus Jean-Claude Fohrenbach, Georges Arvanitas, Sunny Murray, Michel Pascal, Alan Silva, Alexander von Schlippenbach, Hubert Rostaing, Alix Combelle, Ivan Jullien, Christian Chevalier, Jef Gilson, Jack Diéval, Jac Berrocal, Hélène Sage and 17 albums with Un drame musical instantané. In 1995, he co-signs the songs of Carton with Birgé, with whom he collaborates on music for films, exhibitions, and CD-Roms.

Vitet invented instruments such as a reed trumpet, a multiphonic French horn, a variable tension double-bass, the dragoon which is a giant balafon with frying pans and flower pots keyboard, a clever system of modal clocks, and astonishing musical objects for Georges Aperghis, Tamia, and Françoise Achard. Besides trumpet, he sang and played flugelhorn, piano and violin.

He composed theatre music for Jean-Marie Serrault, and for the films (Les coeurs verts by Édouard Luntz, L'ombre de la pomme by Robert Lapoujade with Jean-Louis Chautemps, Bof by Claude Faraldo in collaboration with Jean Guérin, and La femme-bourreau by Jean-Denis Bonan.

From 1976 to 2008, he devoted himself primarily to Un Drame Musical Instantané with Jean-Jacques Birgé, improvising and composing hundreds of pieces together, experimental essays as well as symphonic pieces, songs as well as music for films. Un D.M.I., as a trio or with their 15-piece orchestra, presented multimedia shows involving cinema, video, literature, dance and new technologies.

Site drame.org offers hundreds of unissued pieces free to listen and download.

== Sources ==
- Philippe Carles and Jean-Louis Comolli, Free Jazz Black Power, Ed. Champ Libre, coll.10-18, 1971, p. 418-419
- Philippe Carles, André Clergeat and Jean-Louis Comolli, Dictionnaire du jazz, Ed. Robert Laffont, Coll. Bouquins, Paris, 1994, p. 1220-1221.
