= Yasmina, a Black Woman =

Studio album by Archie Shepp
- Released: 1969
- Recorded: August 12, 1969 (Paris, France)
- Genre: Free jazz
- Label: BYG Actuel; SNAP 162 CD (CD re-issue)
- Producer: Jean Georgakarakos, Jean-Luc Young

Archie Shepp chronology
Live at the Pan-African Festival (1969)	Yasmina, a Black Woman (1969)	Poem for Malcolm (1969)

Professional ratings
Review scores
Source	Rating
AllMusic	4/5 stars
The Penguin Guide to Jazz Recordings	3/4 stars

Yasmina, a Black Woman is a jazz album by Archie Shepp, recorded in 1969 in Paris for BYG Actuel. It features musicians from the Art Ensemble of Chicago. The first track, giving its title to the album, is a long free jazz piece by an 11-piece orchestra; in it, the references to Africa that Shepp had experimented with only a few weeks earlier in Algiers are to be found in the use of African percussion instruments, or the African incantations sung by Shepp himself at the beginning of the track. The other two pieces, a homage to Sonny Rollins written by trombonist Grachan Moncur III and a standard, played by a more traditional quintet and quartet respectively, are more reminiscent of the hard bop genre, although the fiery playing of the musicians, notably Shepp himself, gives them a definite avant-garde edge. It was originally issued on CD by Affinity (paired with Poem for Malcolm), mastered from a vinyl source and later reissued by Charly (also paired with Poem for Malcolm) from the original master tapes.

== Track listing ==
1. "Yasmina, a Black Woman" (A. Shepp) – 20:08
2. "Sonny's Back" (G. Moncur) – 14:03
3. "Body and Soul" (Heyman, Sour, Green) – 6:23

Recorded: Paris, August 12, 1969.

== Personnel ==
=== On "Yasmina, a Black Woman" ===
- Archie Shepp – tenor saxophone, vocal
- Clifford Thornton – cornet
- Lester Bowie – trumpet
- Arthur Jones – alto saxophone
- Roscoe Mitchell – bass saxophone, piccolo
- Dave Burrell – piano
- Malachi Favors, Earl Freeman – bass
- Sunny Murray – drums, percussions
- Art Taylor – rhythm logs
- Laurence Devereaux – balafon

=== On "Sonny's Back" ===
- Archie Shepp, Hank Mobley – tenor saxophone, vocal
- Dave Burrell – piano
- Malachi Favors – bass
- Philly Joe Jones – drums

=== On "Body and Soul" ===
- Archie Shepp – tenor saxophone, vocal
- Dave Burrell – piano
- Malachi Favors – bass
- Philly Joe Jones – drums
