= Alan Silva =

American jazz musician (born 1939)

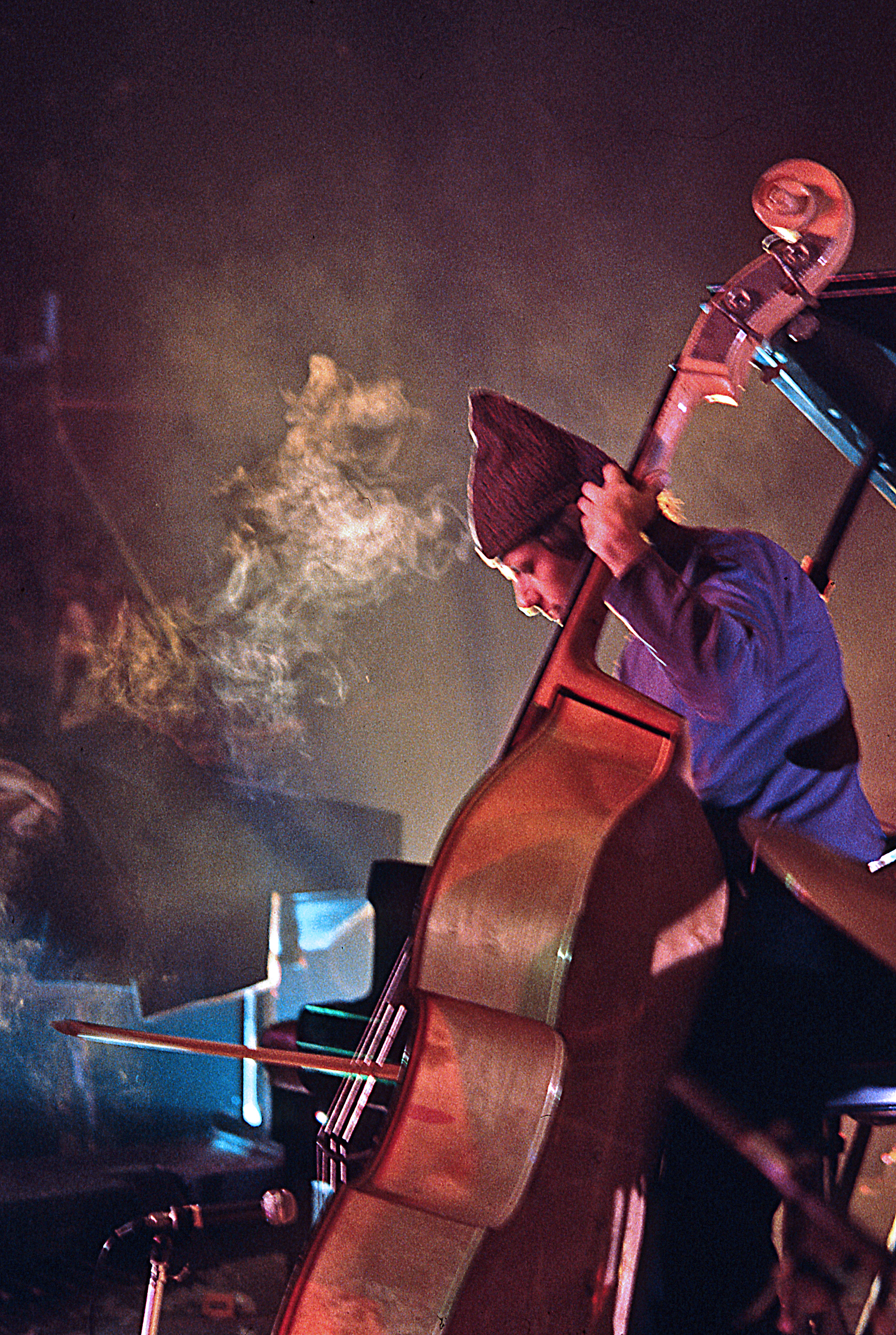
- Silva in Belgium, 1969

Background information
- Born: Alan Lee da Silva; 22 January 1939 (age 87); Bermuda, British Empire
- Genres: Jazz, free jazz, avant-garde jazz
- Occupations: Double bassist, songwriter, bandleader, composer, keyboardist
- Instruments: Upright bass, keyboards, electronic keyboard, trumpet, electric violin, sarangi
- Labels: BYG Actuel, ESP Disk, Impulse!, Blue Note, CBS, Sony, Columbia, Soul Note, Black Saint, JAPO, Hathut, MPS, ESP-Disk
- Website: Alan Silva discography from Center of the World site

Alan Lee da Silva (born 22 January 1939 in Bermuda) is an American free jazz multi-instrumentalist, best known as a double bassist. He has recorded on keyboards, violin, cello and trumpet among other instruments.

== Biography ==
Silva was born a British subject to an Azorean/Portuguese mother, Irene da Silva, and a black Bermudian father known only as "Ruby". He emigrated to the United States at the age of five with his mother, eventually acquiring U.S. citizenship by the age of 18 or 19. He adopted the stage name of Alan Silva in his twenties.

Silva was quoted in a Bermudan newspaper in 1988 as saying that although he left the island at a young age, he always considered himself Bermudian. He was raised in the Harlem neighborhood of New York City, where he first began studying the trumpet, and moved on to study the upright bass.

Silva is known as one of the most inventive bass players in jazz and has performed with many in the world of avant-garde jazz, including Cecil Taylor, Sun Ra, Albert Ayler, Sunny Murray, and Archie Shepp.

Silva performed in 1964's October Revolution in Jazz as a pioneer in the free jazz movement, and for the 1967 live album Albert Ayler in Greenwich Village. Since the early 1970s, Silva has lived mainly in Paris, France, where he formed the Celestrial Communication Orchestra, a group dedicated to the performance of free jazz with various instrumental combinations. In the 1990s he picked up the electronic keyboard, declaring that his bass playing no longer surprised him. He has also used the electric violin and electric sarangi on his recordings.

In the 1980s, Silva opened a music school I.A.C.P. (Institute for Art, Culture and Perception) in Central Paris, together with François Cotinaud and Denis Colin, introducing the concept of a Jazz Conservatory patterned after France's traditional conservatories devoted to European classical music epochs.

Since around 2000, he has performed more frequently as a bassist and bandleader, notably at New York City's annual Vision Festivals.

== Discography ==
=== As leader or co-leader ===
Recording date	Album	Label	Release date	Personnel
1968-11-01	Skillfulness	ESP-Disk	1969	With Karl Berger, Dave Burrell, Becky Friend, Mike Ephron, Lawrence Cooke
1969-08-17	Luna Surface	BYG	1969	With the Celestrial Communication Orchestra
1970-12-29	Seasons	BYG	1971	With the Celestrial Communication Orchestra
1971-01-01	My Country	Leo	1989	With the Celestrial Communication Orchestra
1974-09-01	Inner Song	Center of the World	1974	Solo bass, piano, organ, and voice
1978-11-01	The Shout - Portrait for a Small Woman	Chiaroscuro	1979	With the Celestrial Communication Orchestra
1982-06-25	Desert Mirage	IACP	1982	With the Celestrial Communication Orchestra
1986-11-23	Take Some Risks	In Situ	1989	With Roger Turner, Misha Lobko, Didier Petit, Bruno Girard
1993-04-14	In the Tradition	In Situ	1996	With Johannes Bauer and Roger Turner
1998-03-06	A Hero's Welcome: Pieces for Rare Occasions	Eremite	1999	With William Parker
1999-05-29	Emancipation Suite	Boxholder	2002	With Kidd Jordan and William Parker
1999-05-31	Alan Silva & the Sound Visions Orchestra	Eremite	2001	With the Sound Visions Orchestra
1999-10-16	Transmissions	Eremite	1999	With Oluyemi Thomas
2000-12-01	The All-Star Game	Eremite	2003	With Marshall Allen, Kidd Jordan, William Parker, and Hamid Drake
2001-05-24	H.Con.Res.57/Treasure Box	Eremite	2003	With the Celestrial Communication Orchestra
2006-11-01	Stinging Nettles	Improvising Beings	2014	With Lucien Johnson and Makoto Sato
2008-08-28	Parallel Worlds	Long Song	2012	With Burton Greene
2009-08-29	Crimson Lip	Improvising Beings	2011	With Keiko Higuchi, Sabu Toyozumi, Takuo Tanikawa
2011-04-17	Plug In	Multikulti Project	2013	With Roger Turner
2014-07-21	Free Electric Band	Fortune	2016	With Mette Rasmussen and Ståle Liavik Solberg
2014-11-22	FreeJazzArt	RogueArt	2014	With Jacques Coursil

=== As sideman ===
with Albert Ayler

- Albert Ayler in Greenwich Village (Impulse!, 1967) – live recorded in 1966–67
- Love Cry (Impulse!, 1968) – recorded in 1966–67

with Abdelhai Bennani

- Enfance (Marge, 1998)
- Entrelacs (Tampon Ramier, 2003) – live recorded in 1999
- New Today, New Everyday (Improvising Beings, 2012)
- Free Form Improvisation Ensemble 2013 (Improvising Beings, 2015)[2CD]

with Dave Burrell

- Echo (BYG Actuel, 1969)
- After Love (America, 1971) – recorded in 1970

with Bill Dixon

- Bill Dixon in Italy Volume One (Soul Note, 1980)
- Bill Dixon in Italy Volume Two (Soul Note, 1981)
- Considerations 1 (Fore, 1981)
- November 1981 (Soul Note, 1982)

with Bobby Few

- More Or Less Few (Center of the World)
- Rhapsody in Few (Black Saint)
- Solos & Duets with Frank Wright (Sun Records)

with Sunny Murray

- Sunny Murray (ESP Disk, 1966)
- Big Chief (Pathé, 1969)
- Sunshine (BYG Actuel, 1969)
- Homage to Africa (BYG Actuel, 1970)
- Aigu-Grave (Marge, 1980)
- Perles Noires Volume 1 (Eremite, 2005) – live recorded in 2002–04

with Sun Ra

- Sun Ra-Featuring Pharoah Sanders and Black Harold (Saturn, 1976) – live recorded in 1964
- Nuit de la Fondation Maeght Vol. 1 (Shandar)
- Nuit de la Fondation Maeght Vol. 2 (Shandar)
- It's After the End of the World (MPS, 1970) – live
- Out In Space (MPS)

with Archie Shepp

- Poem for Malcolm (BYG Actuel, 1969)
- Live at the Pan-African Festival (BYG Actuel, 1971) – live recorded in 1969

with Cecil Taylor

- Unit Structures (Blue Note, 1966)
- Conquistador! (Blue Note, 1968) – recorded in 1966
- Les Grandes Répétitions (CBS/Sony, [not released]) – recorded in 1966
- It is in the Brewing Luminous (hat Hut, 1981) – live recorded in 1980

with Frank Wright

- Center of the World (Center of the World, 1972) – live
- Last Polka in Nancy? (Center of the World, 1973) – live
- Solos & Duets with Bobby Few (Sun, 1975)
- Unity (ESP-Disk, 2006)

with others

- Jacques Coursil, Trails of Tears (Sunnyside, 2010) – recorded in 2007–09
- The Globe Unity Orchestra, Intergalactic Blow (JAPO, 1983)
- Burton Greene, Firmanence (Fore, 1980)
- Andrew Hill, Strange Serenade (Soul Note, 1980)
- Franz Koglmann and Bill Dixon, Opium for Franz (Pipe, 1977) – recorded in 1976; 3 tracks reissued on Opium (Between the Lines, 2001)
- Shipen Lebzelter, Rock and Other Four Letter Words (Columbia, 1968)
- Jimmy Lyons, Other Afternoons (BYG Actuel, 1970) – recorded in 1969
- Grachan Moncur III, New Africa (BYG Actuel, 1969)
- Itaru Oki, Paris-Ohraï (Ohraï, 2001)
- William Parker, Requiem with Charles Gayle (Splasc(H), 2006)
- Francois Tusques, Intercommunal Music (Shandar, 1971)

== Filmography ==
- 2001 – Inside Out in the Open (2001). Directed by Alan Roth.
