= Poem for Malcolm =

Studio album by Archie Shepp
- Released: 1969
- Recorded: August 14, 1969 (Paris, France)
- Genre: Free Jazz
- Label: BYG Actuel; SNAP 162 CD (CD re-issue)
- Producer: Jean Georgakarakos, Jean-Luc Young

Archie Shepp chronology
Yasmina, a Black Woman (1969)	Poem for Malcolm (1969)	Blasé (1969)

Professional ratings
Review scores
Source	Rating
Allmusic	2/5 stars

Poem for Malcolm is a jazz album by Archie Shepp. Recorded in Paris in August 1969 only two days after Yasmina, a Black Woman, it again features musicians from the Art Ensemble of Chicago. This time, the tone is resolutely set to avant garde and free jazz, with a political edge in the all but explicit tribute to Malcolm X. The Allmusic review by Scott Yanow states: "This LP from the English Affinity LP is a mixed bag. Best is 'Rain Forrest' on which tenor saxophonist Archie Shepp, in a collaboration with trombonist Grachan Moncur III, pianist Vince Benedetti, bassist Malachi Favors, and drummer Philly Joe Jones, perform some stirring free jazz; the interplay between Shepp and Jones is particularly exciting. On a four-and-a-half minute 'Oleo,' Shepp "battles" some bebop with fellow tenor Hank Mobley, but the other two tracks, a workout for the leader's erratic soprano on 'Mamarose,' and his emotional recitation on 'Poem for Malcolm,' are much less interesting, making this a less than essential release despite 'Rain Forrest'." It was originally issued on CD by Affinity (paired with Yasmina, a Black Woman) mastered from a vinyl source and later reissued by Charly (also paired with Yasmina, a Black Woman) from the original master tapes.

== Track listing ==
1. "Mamarose" (Shepp) – 7:12
2. "Poem for Malcolm" (Shepp) – 5:55
3. "Rain Forrest/Oleo" (Shepp/Sonny Rollins) – 19:16

Recorded: Paris, August 14, 1969.

== Personnel ==
=== On "Rain Forrest/Oleo" ===
- Archie Shepp – tenor saxophone, piano
- Hank Mobley – tenor saxophone
- Grachan Moncur III – trombone
- Vince Benedetti – piano
- Malachi Favors – bass
- Philly Joe Jones – drums

=== On "Mamarose" and "Poem for Malcolm" ===
- Archie Shepp – soprano saxophone, recitation
- Burton Greene – piano
- Alan Silva – bass
- Philly Joe Jones, Claude Delcloo – drums
