= Blasé (album) =

Studio album by Archie Shepp
- Released: 1969
- Recorded: August 16, 1969
- Studio: Studios Davout, Paris, France
- Genre: Jazz, post-bop, avant-garde jazz, free jazz, jazz poetry
- Label: BYG Actuel Vol. 18; CDGR 292-2 (CD re-issue)
- Producer: Jean Georgakarakos, Jean-Luc Young

Archie Shepp chronology
Poem for Malcolm (1969)	Blasé (1969)	Black Gipsy (1969)

Professional ratings
Review scores
Source	Rating
Allmusic	4/5 stars

Blasé is an album by jazz saxophonist Archie Shepp recorded in Europe in 1969 for the BYG Actuel label.

== Reception ==
Thurston Moore of Sonic Youth named the title track as one of his favorite songs of all time.

Pitchfork listed the album at 145 in its 200 Best Albums of the 1960s.

== Track listing ==
All tracks written and arranged by Archie Shepp, except where noted.

1. "My Angel" – 10:08
2. "Blasé" – 10:25
3. "There Is a Balm in Gilead" (Traditional; arranged by Archie Shepp) – 5:57
4. "Sophisticated Lady" (Duke Ellington, Irving Mills) – 5:11
5. "Touareg" – 9:15

== Personnel ==
- Archie Shepp – tenor saxophone
- Jeanne Lee – vocal (except on track 5)
- Dave Burrell – piano (exc. on track 5)
- Chicago Beau – harmonica (tracks 1 & 2)
- Julio Finn – harmonica (tracks 1 & 2)
- Lester Bowie – trumpet, fluegelhorn (track 3)
- Malachi Favors – bass
- Philly Joe Jones – drums
