= Reese and the Smooth Ones =

Studio album by Art Ensemble of Chicago
- Released: 1969
- Recorded: August 12, 1969
- Genre: Jazz
- Label: BYG Actuel
- Producer: Jean Georgakarakos, Jean-Luc Young

Art Ensemble of Chicago chronology
Message to Our Folks (1969)	Reese and the Smooth Ones (1969)	Eda Wobu (1969)

Reese and the Smooth Ones is a 1969 album by the Art Ensemble of Chicago recorded in Paris for the French BYG Actuel label. It features performances by Lester Bowie, Joseph Jarman, Roscoe Mitchell and Malachi Favors Maghostut.

== Reception ==
The Allmusic review by Scott Yanow awarded the album 3 stars noting that "The episodic music continually holds one's interest, and overall, it makes a unified (if unpredictable) statement".

Professional ratings
Review scores
Source	Rating
Allmusic	3/5 stars
The Penguin Guide to Jazz Recordings	3/4 stars

== Track listing ==
1. "Reese Part 1 / The Smooth Ones Part 1" - 20:02
2. "Reese Part 2 / The Smooth Ones Part 2" - 20:57

"Reese" composed by Roscoe Mitchell
"The Smooth Ones" composed by Lester Bowie
- Recorded August 12, 1969 in Paris

== Personnel ==
- Lester Bowie: trumpet, percussion instruments
- Malachi Favors Maghostut: bass, percussion instruments, vocals
- Joseph Jarman: saxophones, clarinets, percussion instruments
- Roscoe Mitchell: saxophones, clarinets, flute, percussion instruments
