= Echo (Dave Burrell album) =

Studio album by Dave Burrell
- Released: 1969
- Recorded: 13 August 1969
- Genres: Post-bop, free jazz, avant-garde jazz
- Length: 42:25
- Labels: BYG (1969); Get Back (2001); Sunspots (2004)
- Producers: Claude Delcloo; Jean Luc Young; Jean Georgakarakos

Dave Burrell chronology
La Vie de Bohème (1969)	Echo (1969)	After Love (1970)

Echo is a studio album released by jazz pianist Dave Burrell. It was recorded on August 13, 1969, and first released as an LP album by BYG Actuel. It was re-released twice, first again on LP by Get Back Records in 2001 before finding its way to compact disc in 2004 via Sunspots Records.

Burrell had been part of an all-star group led by Archie Shepp that played during the 1969 Pan-African Festival in Algiers. While there, French journalists from Paris were on hand and mentioned to Burrell the possibility recording in the city. Deciding on such a venture, Burrell remarked that he "remembered the sound of the ambulances and the police cars in Algiers and that unstable interval of an augmented fourth and thought that was the interval that I wanted to put into 'Echo'." The recording was Burrell's way of honouring the group, since all were involved in the album.

It has been said that the album as a whole "is [a] monster of an LP" and "a curiously schizophrenic set."

== Reception ==
Professional ratings
Review scores
Source	Rating
AllMusic	4/5 stars
The Penguin Guide to Jazz	3/4 stars

AllMusic marvels at the talented ensemble whose members are each "simply blowing or pounding his respective brains out" in the first track that "becomes pleasantly numbing after a while." They even say that "if Echo isn't the noisiest jazz song in the world, it's damned close." The Penguin Guide to Jazz remarks that Echo is "a swirling, all-in blast that palls very quickly." Both sources mention that the second track is more structured and is welcomed after the first song's barrage. Still, The Penguin Guide says that "this is a historical document, hard to listen to now." In response, Burrell has mentioned in interviews that "The French did not know how to record the music, nor did anybody else. The dials were going wild and nobody really knew how to mix it back then."

== Track listing ==
All tracks by Dave Burrell

1. "Echo" — 20:21
2. "Peace" — 22:04

== Personnel ==
Band:

- Dave Burrell — piano, arranger, liner notes
- Arthur Jones — saxophone (alto)
- Grachan Moncur III — trombone
- Sunny Murray — bass, drums
- Archie Shepp — saxophone (tenor)
- Alan Silva — bass
- Clifford Thornton — cornet

Production:

- Jacques Bisceglia — coordination
- Claude Delcloo — executive producer
- Claude Jauvert — engineer
- Philippe Gras — photography
- Jean Luc Young, Jean Georgakarakos — producers
