= Message to Our Folks =

Studio album by Art Ensemble of Chicago
- Released: 1969
- Recorded: August 12, 1969
- Studio: Studio Saravah, Paris
- Genre: Jazz
- Length: 40:45
- Label: BYG Actuel
- Producer: Jean Georgakarakos, Jean-Luc Young

Art Ensemble of Chicago chronology
People in Sorrow (1969)	Message to Our Folks (1969)	Reese and the Smooth Ones (1969)

Message to Our Folks is a 1969 album by the Art Ensemble of Chicago recorded in Paris for the French BYG Actuel label. It features performances by Lester Bowie, Joseph Jarman, Roscoe Mitchell and Malachi Favors Maghostut.

Professional ratings
Review scores
Source	Rating
Allmusic	3/5 stars
The Penguin Guide to Jazz Recordings	3.5/4 stars

== Track listing ==
1. "Old-Time Religion" - 7:41
2. "Dexterity" (Parker) - 4:05
3. "Rock Out" - 8:36
4. "A Brain For The Seine" (Art Ensemble of Chicago) 20:17

All compositions by Roscoe Mitchell except as indicated
- Recorded August 12, 1969 in Paris

== Personnel ==
- Lester Bowie: trumpet, percussion instruments
- Malachi Favors Maghostut: bass, percussion instruments, vocals
- Joseph Jarman: saxophones, clarinets, percussion instruments
- Roscoe Mitchell: saxophones, clarinets, flute, percussion instruments
