= Grachan Moncur III =

American jazz trombonist (1937–2022)

- Born: June 3, 1937; New York City, New York, U.S.
- Died: June 3, 2022 (aged 85) Newark, New Jersey, U.S.
- Genres: Jazz, free jazz, avant-garde jazz
- Occupation: Musician
- Instrument: Trombone
- Years active: 1959–2022

Grachan Moncur III (June 3, 1937 – June 3, 2022) was an American jazz trombonist. He was the son of jazz bassist Grachan Moncur II and the nephew of jazz saxophonist Al Cooper.

== Biography ==
Born in New York City, United States, (his paternal grandfather was from the Bahamas) and raised in Newark, New Jersey, Grachan Moncur III began playing the cello at the age of nine, and switched to the trombone when he was 11. In high school, he attended the Laurinburg Institute in North Carolina, the private school where Dizzy Gillespie had studied. While still at school, he began sitting in with touring jazz musicians on their way through town, including Art Blakey and Jackie McLean, with whom he formed a lasting friendship.

After high school, Moncur toured with Ray Charles (1959–62), Art Farmer and Benny Golson's Jazztet (1962), and Sonny Rollins. He took part in two Jackie McLean albums for Blue Note in 1963, One Step Beyond and Destination... Out!, to which he also contributed the bulk of compositions. He recorded two albums of his own for Blue Note, Evolution (1963) with Jackie McLean and Lee Morgan, and Some Other Stuff (1964) with Herbie Hancock and Wayne Shorter.

Moncur joined Archie Shepp's ensemble, and recorded with other avant-garde players such as Marion Brown, Beaver Harris and Roswell Rudd (another free jazz trombonist). During a stay in Paris in the summer of 1969, he recorded two albums as a leader for the BYG Actuel label, New Africa and Aco Dei de Madrugada, as well as appearing as a sideman on other releases of the label. In 1974, the Jazz Composer's Orchestra commissioned him to write Echoes of Prayer (1974), a jazz symphony featuring a full orchestra plus vocalists and jazz soloists. His sixth album as a leader, Shadows (1977) was released only in Japan. He was subsequently plagued by health problems and copyright disputes and recorded only rarely. Through the 1980s, he recorded with Cassandra Wilson (1985), played occasionally with the Paris Reunion Band and Frank Lowe, appeared on Big John Patton's Soul Connection (1983), but mostly concentrated on teaching. In 2004, he re-emerged with a new album, Exploration, on Capri Records featuring Moncur's compositions arranged by Mark Masters for an octet including Tim Hagans and Gary Bartz.

Moncur died from cardiac arrest on June 3, 2022, his 85th birthday, at his home in Newark, New Jersey.

== Discography ==
=== As a leader ===
- Evolution (Blue Note, 1963)
- Some Other Stuff (Blue Note, 1964)
- "Blue Free" and "The Intellect" on The New Wave in Jazz (Impulse!, 1965)
- The New Breed (The Dedication Series/Vol.VXIII) Sides C and D-1 (Impulse, 1978 [recorded 1965])
- New Africa (BYG Actuel, 1969)
- Aco Dei de Madrugada (One Morning I Waked Up Very Early) (BYG Actuel, 1969)
- Echoes of Prayer (JCOA, 1974 [1975])
- Shadows (Denon, 1977)
- Exploration (Capri, 2004)
- Inner Cry Blues (Lunar Module, 2007)

=== As a sideman ===
with Marion Brown:

- Juba-Lee (Fontana, 1967)
- Three for Shepp (Impulse!, 1967)

with Dave Burrell:

- Echo (BYG Actuel, 1969)
- La Vie de Bohème (BYG Actuel, 1970)

with Benny Golson:

- Here and Now (Mercury, 1962) – with Art Farmer
- Another Git Together (Mercury, 1962) – with Art Farmer
- Pop + Jazz = Swing (Audio Fidelity, 1962) – later version as Just Jazz!
- Stockholm Sojourn (Prestige, 1965)

with Herbie Hancock:

- My Point of View (Blue Note, 1963)

with Beaver Harris:

- Safe (Red, 1979)
- Beautiful Africa (Soul Note, 1979)
- Live at Nyon (Cadence Jazz, 1981)

with Joe Henderson:

- The Kicker (Milestone, 1967)

with Khan Jamal:

- Black Awareness (CIMP, 2005)

with Frank Lowe:

- Decision in Paradise (Soul Note, 1985)

with Jackie McLean:

- One Step Beyond (Blue Note, 1963)
- Destination... Out! (Blue Note, 1964)
- 'Bout Soul (Blue Note, 1967)
- Hipnosis (Blue Note, 1967)

with Lee Morgan:

- The Last Session (Blue Note, 1971)

with Butch Morris:

- In Touch... but out of Reach (Kharma, 1982)

with Sunny Murray:

- Homage to Africa (BYG Actuel, 1969)

with Sunny Murray, Khan Jamal and Romulus:

- Change of the Century Orchestra (JAS, 1999)

with Paris Reunion Band:

- For Klook (Gazell, 1987)

with William Parker:

- In Order to Survive (Black Saint, 1995)

with John Patton:

- Soul Connection (Nilva, 1983)

with The Reunion Legacy Band:

- The Legacy (Early Bird, 1991)

with Archie Shepp:

- Mama Too Tight (Impulse!, 1966)
- The Way Ahead (album) (Impulse!, 1968)
- Poem for Malcolm (BYG Actuel, 1969)
- For Losers (Impulse!, 1970)
- Things Have Got to Change (Impulse!, 1971)
- Live at the Pan-African Festival (BYG Actuel, 1971)
- Life at the Donaueschingen Festival (MPS, 1972)
- Kwanza (Impulse!, 1974)
- Freedom (JMY, 1991)

with Archie Shepp and Roswell Rudd:

- Live in New York (Verve, 2001)

with Wayne Shorter:

- The All Seeing Eye (Blue Note, 1965)

with Alan Silva:

- Luna Surface (BYG Actuel, 1969)

with Clifford Thornton:

- Ketchaoua (BYG Actuel, 1969)

with Chris White:

- The Chris White Project (Muse, 1993)

with Cassandra Wilson:

- Point of View (JMT, 1986)
