= New Africa (album) =

Studio album by Grachan Moncur III
- Released: August 11, 1969
- Recorded: 1969; Paris
- Genre: Jazz, free jazz
- Length: 46:52
- Label: BYG Actuel

Grachan Moncur III chronology
Some Other Stuff (1965)	New Africa (1969)	Aco dei de madrugada (1969)

Professional ratings
Review scores
Source	Rating
AllMusic	4/5 stars

New Africa is an album by American trombonist Grachan Moncur III recorded in 1969 and released on the BYG Actuel label in the same year. It features alto saxophonist Roscoe Mitchell (Art Ensemble of Chicago), pianist Dave Burrell, bassist Alan Silva and drummer Andrew Cyrille. Tenor saxophonist Archie Shepp performs on the final track.

== Reception ==
Scott Yanow of Allmusic stated: "Also put out in Europe by the BYG and Actuel labels, this British LP is fairly adventurous, featuring the originals and trombone of Grachan Moncur III. He matches ideas with altoist Roscoe Mitchell, pianist Dave Burrell, bassist Alan Silva, drummer Andrew Cyrille and (on one of the four pieces) his former boss, tenor saxophonist Archie Shepp. Three of the selections are a bit reminiscent of the John Coltrane Quartet in their modality, but it is during the four movements of the continuous 'New Africa' that Moncur can be heard at his dynamic best."

A reviewer of Dusty Groove wrote: "Excellent work from trombonist Grachan Moncur III – famous for his 60s work on Blue Note and with Archie Shepp, sounding as great here as he did on those recordings! The session features Moncur hitting an Archie Shepp-ish, spiritual vein in his playing – recorded in Paris with a group that includes Shepp, Roscoe Mitchell, Dave Burrell, and Andrew Cyrille. Side one's mostly the long suite 'New Africa', but it also includes the great composition 'Space Spy' – and side two features the tracks 'When' and 'Exploration'. The whole album's incredible – much more soulful than some of Moncur's 'new thing' recordings, and equally compelling!"

== Track listing ==
All compositions by Grachan Moncur III.

1. "New Africa" - 17:34
2. "Space Spy" - 6:29
3. "Exploration" - 10:42
4. "When" - 12:07

== Personnel ==
- Grachan Moncur III - trombone
- Roscoe Mitchell - alto saxophone
- Archie Shepp - tenor saxophone ("When" only)
- Dave Burrell - piano
- Alan Silva - bass
- Andrew Cyrille - drums
