= Jean Georgakarakos =

French music producer and executive (1940–2017)

Background information
- Also known as: Jean Karakos, Busy P
- Born: Jean Georgakarakos; 26 June 1940; Malestroit, Brittany, France
- Origin: France
- Died: 22 January 2017 (aged 76) Paris
- Occupations: producer, manager
- Labels: Celluloid Records, BYG Records, Distance

Jean Georgakarakos (aka Jean Karakos; 26 June 1940 – 22 January 2017) was a French music producer, record label owner, and artist manager.

== Biography ==
In 1960, he created the label Star Success and in 1964, followed this with a second label Joc. Around the same time he began importing albums from the United States which he sold in his network of record stores in France, Pop Shop, in cities such as Paris, Lyon, Grenoble, Aix-en-Provence.

In 1967, along with Jean-Luc Young and Fernand Boruso, he formed jazz record label BYG Records, which collapsed in the mid-1970s. Georgakarakos also produced albums such as Sonny Sharrock's Monkie-Pockie Boo, and some Art Ensemble of Chicago, Archie Shepp, Don Cherry Magma and Gong material. In 1969 he organised the Festival d'Amougies with Jean-Luc Young featuring Frank Zappa as master of ceremonies and artists like Sam Apple Pie, Soft Machine, Blossom Toes, Caravan, The Nice, Pink Floyd, Archie Shepp, Captain Beefheart, Martin Circus, Ame Son, Cruciferius, We Free, Gong, Burton Greene, Ten Years After, Sunny Murray, Alexis Korner, Colosseum and the Art Ensemble of Chicago.

In 1976 he founded Celluloid Records in New York City, and produced a series of eclectic and ground-breaking releases, particularly in the early to late 1980s, largely under the auspices of de facto in-house producer Bill Laswell. In 1982 he organised the tour, New York City Rap.

In 1989, Georgakarakos having returned to Paris, produced in partnership with film director, Olivier Lorsac, the zouk/Brazilian music influenced, Kaoma band which consisted of ex-Celluloid recording artists from Toure Kunda and the main group to musically represent the repertoire of the lambada dance music explosion in Europe during that same year. Originally intended for Celluloid's Brazilian division, the lambada music compilation and video was eventually released on CBS Records worldwide, reaching no. 1 on top of the pop music charts in Europe.

Facing the worldwide success of the hit, and the necessities of its management, Georgakarakos sold in debt Celluloid to American businessman John Matarazzo for a symbolic dollar. Matarazzo was to repay Celluloid's debt to French Bank Société Générale, which had mortgaged the whole recording, publishing and branding catalogue. As he failed to do so, Societe Generale got back its rights over the catalogue and sold it back to Georgakarakos and his associates of Adageo in 1994.

In 1995, he created the dance label Distance. He also co-founded Musisoft Next which operated from 1997 until 2005. This company merged with Sonodisc in 1998 and was responsible for launching many labels.

He died in Paris on 22 January 2017 and is buried in the Saint-Ouen Cemetery.
