= Space Dimension =

Studio album by Noah Howard
- Released: 1971
- Recorded: 1970
- Studio: Paris
- Genre: Free jazz
- Label: America Records; 30 AM 6108
- Producer: Pierre Berjot

Noah Howard chronology
At Judson Hall (1968)	Space Dimension (1971)	The Black Ark (1972)

Space Dimension is an album by alto saxophonist Noah Howard. It was recorded during 1970 in Paris, and was released on vinyl in 1971 by America Records. In 2019, it was reissued by Eating Standing, an Italian label. On the album, Howard is joined by tenor saxophonist Frank Wright, pianist Bobby Few, and drummer Art Taylor. Drummer Muhammad Ali also appears on one track. Space Dimension is one of four albums recorded in Paris by the group, the others, credited to Wright, being Uhuru na Umoja (America, 1970), One for John (BYG, 1970), and Church Number Nine (Odeon, 1971).

== Reception ==
Professional ratings
Review scores
Source	Rating
The Encyclopedia of Popular Music	3/5 stars
The Virgin Encyclopedia of Jazz	2/5 stars

In a review of the 2019 reissue for The New York City Jazz Record, Pierre Crépon stated that the album "stands as the best document of one of the free jazz bands that mattered in a pivotal period and its return to circulation has been long overdue."

Author John Corbett noted that "where Wright is as voluble and gruff as can be, Howard is the perfect complement, a compact, focused sound." He singled out "Church Number Nine" for praise, writing: "the whole machine takes its rightful shape, Wright screaming bloody murder, Howard joining for the ridiculously perfect little r&b/gospel riff, a maniacal laugh and corkscrew multiphonic ending the track on an unhinged note."

== Track listing ==
"Church Number Nine" composed by Frank Wright. Remaining tracks composed by Noah Howard.

1. "Space Dimension" – 5:40
2. "Viva Black" – 6:50
3. "Church Number Nine" – 9:10
4. "Song for Poets" – 6:10
5. "Blues for Thelma" – 13:20

== Personnel ==
- Noah Howard – alto saxophone
- Frank Wright – tenor saxophone
- Bobby Few – piano
- Art Taylor – drums (tracks 1, 2, 4, and 5)
- Muhammad Ali – drums (track 3)
