= Sun Records (disambiguation) =

Sun Records is an American independent record label founded by Sam Phillips in 1950.

Sun Records may also refer to:

- Sun Records (jazz), a jazz record label created by Sébastien Bernard in 1971
- Sun Records (other companies), other 20th century record labels
- Sun Records (TV series), an American drama television miniseries
