= Bobby Few =

American jazz musician (1935–2021)

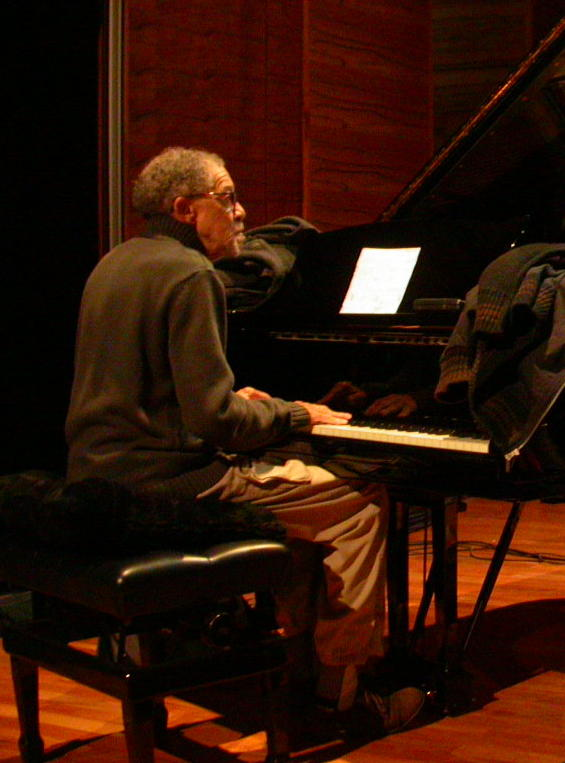
- Few in 2007

Background information
- Born: Robert Lee Few; October 21, 1935; Cleveland, Ohio, U.S.
- Died: January 6, 2021 (aged 85) Levallois-Perret, France
- Genre: Jazz
- Instruments: Piano, vocals
- Formerly of: Albert Ayler, Steve Lacy, Frank Wright
- Website: www.avramfefer.com/bobby-few

Bobby Few (October 21, 1935 – January 6, 2021) was an American jazz pianist and vocalist.

== Early life ==
Born Robert Lee Few Junior on October 21, 1935, in Cleveland, Ohio, "he was the son of Robert Senior, a maître d'hôtel at a white country club, and Winifred, an amateur violinist", and grew up in the Fairfax neighborhood of the city's East Side. On his mother's encouragement, Few studied classical piano, but later discovered jazz while listening to his father's Jazz at the Philharmonic records. His father became his first booking agent, and soon Few was doing gigs around the greater Cleveland area with other local musicians including Bill Hardman, Bob Cunningham, Cevera Jefferies and Frank Wright. He was exposed to Tadd Dameron and Benny Bailey during his youth, and knew Albert Ayler, with whom he played in high school. As a young man, Few also gigged with local tenor legend Tony "Big T" Lovano – Joe Lovano's father.

== Career ==
In the late 1950s, Few relocated to New York, where he led a trio from 1958 to 1964; there, he met and began working with many world-class musicians, including singer Brook Benton, and saxophonists Rahsaan Roland Kirk, Jackie McLean, Joe Henderson and Ayler. Few played on several of Ayler's albums and also recorded with Alan Silva, Noah Howard, Muhammad Ali, Booker Ervin, and Kali Fasteau. In 1969, he moved to France and rapidly integrated the expatriate jazz community, working frequently with Archie Shepp, Sunny Murray, Steve Lacy and Rasul Siddik. From 2001, he toured internationally with American saxophonist Avram Fefer, with whom he recorded four critically acclaimed CDs.

Few played extensively around Europe and made regular trips back to the United States. Recently, he played with saxophonist Charles Gayle and led his own trio in Paris, France. He was working on a Booker Ervin tribute project called Few's Blues that featured tenor player Tony Lakatos, bassist Reggie Johnson and drummer Doug Sides. Few was interviewed in a 2008 documentary, later released on DVD, on drummer Sunny Murray – "Sunny's Time Now".

Bobby Few died on January 6, 2021, at the age of 85.

== Playing style ==
Some of Few's various playing styles were described by Kevin Whitehead: "He can play delicate single-note melodies, roll out lush romantic chords, rap out explicitly Monkish close-interval clanks – though he's a busier pianist than Monk – or roil around in classic free style, using a sustain pedal to shape the density of his sound".

== Discography ==
=== As leader or co-leader ===
Year recorded	Title	Label	Personnel/Notes
1973	More or Less Few	Center of the World	Trio, with Alan Silva (bass), Muhammad Ali (drums)
1975	Solos and Duets	Sun	Solo piano; most tracks are by Alan Silva and Frank Wright, without Few
1975	Solos and Duets Vol 2	Sun	Duo, with Alan Silva; other tracks are by Silva and Frank Wright, without Few
1977	Few Coming Thru	Sun	Solo piano
1979	Continental Jazz Express	Vogue	Solo piano
1979	Diom Futa	Free Lance	Trio, with Jo Maka (soprano sax), Cheikh Tidiane Fall (percussion)
1983	Rhapsody in Few	Black Lion	Trio, with Alan Silva (bass), Muhammad Ali (drums)
1992	Mysteries	Miss You Jazz	
1997	Expatriate Kin	CIMP	Trio, with Zusaan Kali Fasteau (cello, soprano sax), Noah Howard (alto sax)
2000	Continental Jazz Express	Boxholder	Solo piano; in concert
2000	Few and Far Between	Boxholder	Trio, with Avram Fefer (tenor sax), Wilber Morris (bass); in concert
2002	Let It Rain		
2002	Live in New York	Boxholder	
2004	Kindred Spirits	Boxholder	Duo, with Avram Fefer (tenor sax, clarinet)
2004	Heavenly Places	Boxholder	Duo, with Avram Fefer (tenor sax, clarinet)
2004	Lights and Shadows	Boxholder	Solo piano
2005	Sanctuary	CIMP	with Avram Fefer
2007	True Wind	Hello World!	with Sonny Simmons

=== As sideman ===
Years in brackets refer to dates of recording.

With Albert Ayler

- Music is the Healing Force of the Universe (Impulse!, 1969)
- The Last Album (Impulse!, 1969)

With Jacques Coursil

- Trails of Tears (Sunnyside, 2010)

With Hans Dulfer

- El Saxofón (Catfish, 1970)

With Mike Ellis

- What Else is New? (Alfa, 1985)

With Booker Ervin

- The In Between (Blue Note, 1968)

With Zusaan Kali Fasteau

- Sensual Hearing (Flying Note, 1994–95)
- Camaraderie (Flying Note, 1997)
- Making Waves (Flying Note, 2004)

With Avram Fefer

- Few and Far Between (Boxholder 2002) w/ Wilber Morris
- Kindred Spirits (Boxholder, 2005)
- Heavenly Places (Boxholder, 2005)
- Sanctuary (CIMP, 2006) w/ Newman Taylor Baker, Hill Greene

With Ricky Ford

- Songs for My Mother (Jazz Friends Production, 2001)

With Noah Howard

- Space Dimension (America, 1971)
- Red Star (Mercury, 1977)
- Traffic (Frame, 1980)
- In Concert (Cadence, 1997)
- Live at the Unity Temple (Ayler, 1997)

With Talib Kibwe

- Egyptian Oasis (Cryonic, 1986)

With Steve Lacy

- Songs (hat ART, 1981) with Brion Gysin
- Ballets (hat ART, 1981)
- The Flame (Soul Note, 1982)
- Blinks (hat ART, 1983)
- Lift the Bandstand (1983) DVD
- Prospectus (hat ART, 1983) also released as Cliches
- The Condor (Soul Note, 1985)
- The Gleam (Silkheart, 1986)
- Momentum (RCA Novus, 1987)
- The Door (RCA Novus, 1988)
- Anthem (RCA Novus, 1989)
- Itinerary (hat ART, 1991)
- Live at Sweet Basil (RCA Novus, 1992)
- Associates (Felmay 1992)
- Clangs (hat ART, 1993)
- Vespers (Soul Note, 1993)
- Findings (CMAP, 1994)

With David Murray

- Flowers Around Cleveland (Bleu Regard, 1995)

With Sunny Murray

- Aigu-Grave (Marge, 1979)

With Archie Shepp

- Pitchin Can (America, 1970)
- Coral Rock (America, 1970)

With Alan Silva

- Seasons (BYG, 1971)
- H.Con.Res.57/Treasure Box (Eremite, 2003)

With Marzette Watts

- The Marzette Watts Ensemble (Savoy, 1968)

With Joe Lee Wilson

- Secrets From The Sun (Sun, 1977)

With Frank Wright

- Uhuru na Umoja (Emarcy, 1970)
- One for John (BYG, 1970)
- Church Number Nine (Odeon, 1971)
- Center of the World (Center of the World, 1972)
- For Example – Workshop Freie Musik 1969–1978 (FMP, 1972)
- Last Polka in Nancy? (Center of the World, 1973)
- Unity (ESP-Disk, 1974)
