= Scotty Holt =

American jazz musician

Scotty Holt is an American jazz bassist. He is known for his work with Jackie McLean for Blue Note Records in the 1960s, on albums such as New and Old Gospel and Hipnosis. He also performed in McLean's quartet, along with Billy Higgins and LaMont Johnson. An example of their work in concert is provided by the SteepleChase Records LP, Dr. Jackle. He also recorded with Woody Shaw, Bud Powell, and Ornette Coleman. He toured Europe with Art Blakey in 1969, and has not recorded since.

== Discography ==
=== As sideman ===
With Noah Howard

- Noah Howard Quartet (ESP-Disk, 1966)

With Jackie McLean

- New and Old Gospel (Blue Note, 1967 [1968])
- 'Bout Soul (Blue Note, 1967 [1969])
- Demon's Dance (Blue Note, 1967 [1970])
- Hipnosis (Blue Note, 1962 & 1967 [1978])
- Dr. Jackle (SteepleChase, 1966 [1979])
- Tune Up (SteepleChase, 1966 [1981])

With Woody Shaw

- Jersey Blues (Lone Hill, 1969 [2004])
