= Coral Rock =

Studio album by Archie Shepp
- Released: 1973
- Recorded: July 23, 1970
- Genre: Jazz
- Label: America
- Producer: Pierre Berjot

Archie Shepp chronology
Archie Shepp and the Full Moon Ensemble (1970)	Coral Rock (1973)	Doodlin' (1976)

Professional ratings
Review scores
Source	Rating
AllMusic	4/5 stars
DownBeat	4/5 stars
The Rolling Stone Jazz Record Guide	3/5 stars

Coral Rock is an album by jazz saxophonist Archie Shepp recorded in Europe in 1970 for the America label at the same sessions which produced Pitchin Can. The album was also issued by the Prestige label in 1973.

== Reception ==
The AllMusic review by Brandon Burke states "Coral Rock features an absolutely monster free jazz lineup... This is free jazz straight out of the late-'60s/early-'70s Paris scene. Very serious stuff".

== Track listing ==
1. "Coral Rock" (Alan Shorter) – 21:35
2. "I Should Care" (Sammy Cahn, Axel Stordahl, Paul Weston) – 14:05
  - Recorded in Paris, France, July 23, 1970

== Personnel ==
- Archie Shepp - tenor saxophone, piano, soprano saxophone
- Clifford Thornton - trumpet, valve trombone
- Lester Bowie - trumpet
- Alan Shorter - flugelhorn
- Bobby Few - piano
- Bob Reid: bass
- Muhammad Ali - drums
- Djibrill - congas
- Ostaine Blue Warner - percussion
