= Avram Fefer =

American jazz saxophonist, composer, and bandleader

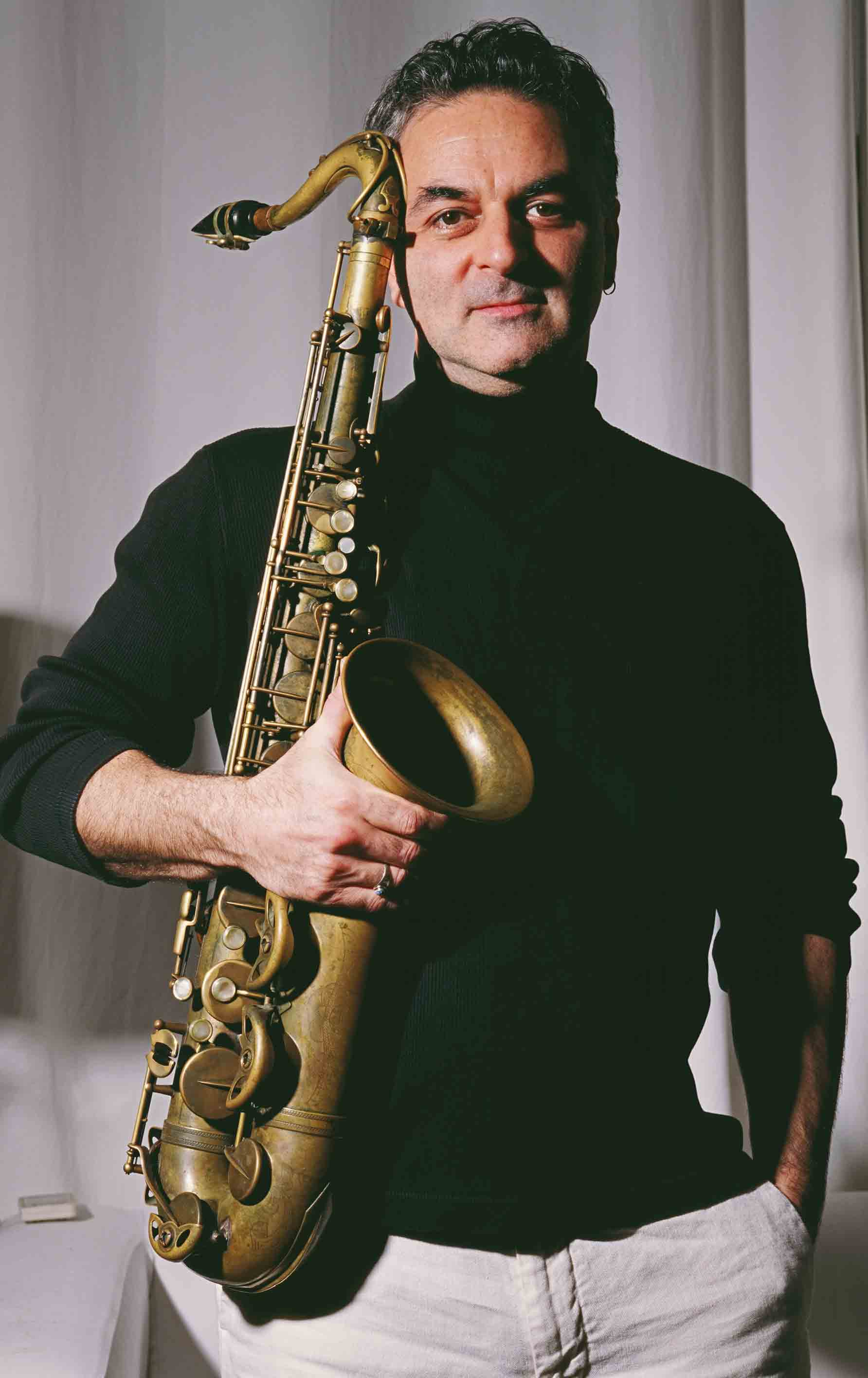

Background information
- Born: East Palo Alto, California
- Genre: Jazz
- Occupation: Musician
- Instruments: Saxophone, clarinet, flute
- Years active: 1990–present
- Spouse: Lorenza Astengo Fefer
- Website: www.avramfefer.com

Avram Fefer is an American jazz saxophonist, clarinetist, composer and band leader. He has recorded thirteen albums as a leader, many more as a sideman, and has performed in all the major venues of New York, as well as touring throughout Europe, Africa, Japan, and the Middle-East. His latest quartet albums - Testament and Juba Lee - feature guitarist Marc Ribot, bassist Eric Revis, and drummer Chad Taylor.

== Career ==
Fefer, a first generation American whose father was born in a Siberian labor camp, grew up on both coasts of the United States, before attending Harvard University, Berklee College of Music, and the New England Conservatory. He spent several years in Paris, where he played with Archie Shepp, The Last Poets, Sunny Murray, Kirk Lightsey, Rasul Siddik, Graham Haynes, and John Betsch. In Paris he became interested in West African and Arabic music, playing with musicians from Senegal, Cameroon, Mali, and Morocco. While in France, he was a composer and soloist for the acid jazz group Beigels Daisy Toast each of whose albums sold in more than 15,000 copies.

He has been a featured soloist in the David Murray Big Band, Butch Morris Orchestra, Joseph Bowie Big Band, Mingus Big Band, Frank Lacy's Vibe Tribe, the Rob Reddy Octet, Famoro Diabate's Kakande, the Adam Lane Octet, and the Michael Bisio Quartet, but his longest associations have been with Adam Rudolph's Organic Orchestra, and Greg Tate's Burnt Sugar Arkestra. He worked with director Ivo Van Hove on A Streetcar Named Desire and with Melvin Van Peebles on his 2010 theatrical production of Sweet Sweetback's Baadasssss Song in which he played tenor saxophone and had a small acting role. He is the creator and performer of the Resonant Sculpture Project - a series of solo musical interactions with the large-scale works of sculptor Richard Serra. In addition to performing and composing, he teaches privately from his Brooklyn studio.

== Discography ==
=== As leader ===
- Calling All Spirits (Cadence, 2001)
- Lucille's Gemini Dream (CIMP, 2001)
- Few and Far Between (Boxholder, 2002)
- Shades of the Muse (CIMP, 2003)
- Painting Breath Stoking Fire (CIMP, 2005)
- Heavenly Places (Boxholder, 2005)
- Kindred Spirits (Boxholder, 2005)
- Sanctuary (CIMP, 2005)
- Ritual w/ Eric Revis, Chad Taylor (Clean Feed, 2009)
- Eliyahu w/ Eric Revis, Chad Taylor (Not Two, 2011)
- Shimmer and Melt, Big Picture Holiday (Ropeadope, 2015)
- Deja VooDoo, Rivers on Mars w/ Greg Tate (Ropeadope, 2017)
- Testament w/ Marc Ribot, Eric Revis, Chad Taylor (Clean Feed, 2019)
- Juba Lee w/ Marc Ribot, Eric Revis, Chad Taylor (Clean Feed, 2022)

=== As sideman ===
With Michael Bisio

- Connections (CIMP, 2005)
- Circle This (CIMP, 2007)
- Live at Vision Fest. XII (Not Two, 2008)
- AM (CIMP, 2017)

With Burnt Sugar

- Making Love to the Dark Ages (LiveWired, 2009)
- All Ya Needs That Negrocity (Avant Groidd, 2011)
- All You Zombies Dig the Luminosity (Avant Groidd, 2017)
- Angels Over Oakanda (Avant Groidd, 2021)

With Bobby Few

- Bobby Few, Few and Far Between (Boxholder, 2002)
- Bobby Few, Kindred Spirits (Boxholder, 2005)
- Bobby Few, Heavenly Places (Boxholder, 2005)
- Bobby Few, Sanctuary (CIMP, 2005)

With Adam Rudolph

- Adam Rudolph, The Sound of a Dream (Meta, 2011)
- Adam Rudolph, Sonic Mandala (Meta, 2013)
- Adam Rudolph, Ragmala (Meta, 2019)

With Adam Lane

- Adam Lane, Oh Freedom! (CIMP, 2010)
- Adam Lane, Ashcan Rantings (Clean Feed, 2011)
- Adam Lane, Blue Spirit Band (CIMP, 2013)
- Adam Lane, Live in Ljubljana (Clean Feed, 2014)

With others

- Steve McCraven w/ Archie Shepp, Song of the Forest Boogeraboo (IAM, 1994)
- The Last Poets, Scatterap/Home (Bond Age, 1994)
- Beigels Daisy Toast, Omnibus (Virgin France, 1994)
- Beigels Daisy Toast, Eat That Beigel (Virgin France, 1995)
- Manhattan New Music Project, The Soul of Grace (Soul Note, 1998)
- Sharrif Simmons, The Echo Effect (2006)
- Stuart Popejoy, Pleonid (Leo, 2006)
- Michael Veal and Aqua Ife Vol.1, Michael Veal and Aqua Ife (2010)
- Dinamitri Jazz Folklore w/ Amiri Baraka, Live in Sant'Anna Arresi (2013)
