= Demon's Dance =

Studio album by Jackie McLean
- Released: October 1970
- Recorded: December 22, 1967
- Studio: Van Gelder Studio, Englewood Cliffs, NJ
- Genre: Post-bop
- Length: 36:26
- Label: Blue Note; BST 84345
- Producer: Francis Wolff

Jackie McLean chronology
'Bout Soul (1967)	Demon's Dance (1970)	Live at Montmartre (1972)

Demon's Dance is an album by American saxophonist Jackie McLean recorded in 1967 for Blue Note, but not released until 1970. It features McLean in a quintet with trumpeter Woody Shaw, pianist LaMont Johnson, bassist Scotty Holt and drummer Jack DeJohnette.

== Reception ==
The AllMusic review by Steve Huey stated: "The record retreats a bit from McLean's nearly free playing on New and Old Gospel and 'Bout Soul, instead concentrating on angular, modal avant bop with more structured chord progressions... While Demon's Dance didn't quite push McLean's sound the way its two predecessors had, there was no sign that the altoist was beginning to run out of creative steam".

Professional ratings
Review scores
Source	Rating
AllMusic	4.5/5 stars
The Rolling Stone Jazz Record Guide	3/5 stars

== Track listing ==
All compositions by Jackie McLean, except as indicated.

No.	Title	Length
1.	"Demon's Dance"	7:09
2.	"Toyland" (Cal Massey)	5:24
3.	"Boo Ann's Grand" (Woody Shaw)	6:57
4.	"Sweet Love of Mine" (Shaw)	6:04
5.	"Floogeh"	5:23
6.	"Message From Trane" (Massey)	5:29

== Personnel ==
Musicians

- Jackie McLean – alto saxophone
- Woody Shaw – trumpet, flugelhorn
- LaMont Johnson – piano
- Scotty Holt – bass
- Jack DeJohnette – drums

Production

- Francis Wolff – producer
- Rudy Van Gelder – engineer (recording)
- Bob Venosa – design
- Mati Klarwein – artwork
- Leonard Feather – liner notes
