= Hipnosis (Jackie McLean album) =

Studio album by Jackie McLean
- Released: 1978
- Recorded: June 14, 1962 (#1–6); February 3, 1967 (#7–11)
- Studio: Van Gelder Studio, Englewood Cliffs, NJ
- Genre: Jazz
- Length: 38:35 Japanese issue 80:10 US issue
- Label: Blue Note; BN-LA 483-H2
- Producer: Alfred Lion

Jackie McLean chronology
| Dr Jackle (1966) | Hipnosis (1978) | New and Old Gospel (1967) |

Hipnosis is a studio album by saxophonist Jackie McLean. It features selections recorded for Blue Note Records in the 1960s, but not released until 1978. The album was released in the US as a two-fer (BN-LA 483-H2), which included five songs from a 1967 session, plus six songs recorded in 1962 later appeared on the CD reissue of Vertigo (see #6–11). In Japan, it was released the same year as a standard LP (ST-83022) with a different cover, featuring only the 1967 tracks.

== Reception ==
Professional ratings
Review scores
| Source | Rating |
|---|---|
| AllMusic | 4/5 stars |
| The Rolling Stone Jazz Record Guide | 3/5 stars |
| The Virgin Encyclopedia of Jazz | 3/5 stars |

In a review for AllMusic, Scott Yanow noted that the music is "strongly influenced (but not derivative) of the avant-garde players," and wrote: "Despite being overlooked, the music on both of these dates is up to the high level of Jackie McLean's better-known Blue Note dates and is easily recommended to fans of the innovative altoist."

Daniel Spicer of Jazzwise called the album "an overlooked gem," and commented: "it's hard to see why it isn't a stone cold classic in its own right. Tracks like 'The Reason Why' offer the headlong rush of razor sharp hard bop, while on the slinky title track [Grachan] Moncur's buffeting trombone hints at the influence of the New Thing."

== Track listing ==
Japanese release

1. "Hipnosis" (Moncur III) - 11:19
2. "Slow Poke" (McLean) - 7:49
3. "The Breakout" (McLean) - 6:29
4. "Back Home" (Moncur III) - 6:05
5. "The Reason Why" (LaMont Johnson) - 6:53

US release

1. "The Three Minors" (McLean) - 6:05
2. "Blues in a Jiff" (Clark) - 7:12
3. "Blues for Jackie" (Kenny Dorham) - 7:53
4. "Marilyn's Dilemma" (Billy Higgins) - 5:03
5. "Iddy Bitty" (McLean) - 8:17
6. "The Way I Feel" (Butch Warren) - 7:05
7. "Hipnosis" (Moncur III) - 11:19
8. "Slow Poke" (McLean) - 7:49
9. "The Breakout" (McLean) - 6:29
10. "Back Home" (Moncur III) - 6:05
11. "The Reason Why" (LaMont Johnson) - 6:53

Recorded on June 14, 1962 (#1–6) and February 3, 1967 (#7–11).

== Personnel ==
Tracks 1–6

- Jackie McLean - alto saxophone
- Kenny Dorham - trumpet
- Sonny Clark - piano
- Butch Warren - bass
- Billy Higgins - drums

Tracks 7–11

- Jackie McLean - alto saxophone
- Grachan Moncur III - trombone
- LaMont Johnson - piano
- Scotty Holt - bass
- Billy Higgins - drums
