= Doodlin' =

Doodlin' may refer to:

- "Doodlin'" (Horace Silver song), a composition by Horace Silver
- Doodlin' (album), a recording by saxophonist Archie Shepp
