= Sun Records (jazz) =

French jazz record label

Sun Records was a jazz record company and label created by Sébastien Bernard in 1971 to distribute the label Center of the World Records, begun by the Free Jazz Quartet Center of the World. The quartet consisted of saxophonist Frank Wright, bassist Alan Silva, pianist Bobby Few, and drummer Muhammad Ali.

== Discography ==
Cat #	Album	Leader	Year
102	Solos & duets	Frank Wright, Bobby Few, Alan Silva	rec. 7501–7511
103	Solos & duets [vol. 2?]	Frank Wright, Bobby Few, Alan Silva	rec. 7501-7511
105	Live in Europe, vol. 1	Noah Howard	rec. 1975
106	Solo	Kent Carter, w/ Claude Bernard	rec. 7510 & 7609
108	Patterns	Noah Howard	rec. 7110
109	Night music	Takashi Kako	rec. 741121
112	Tapestry	Ted Daniel	rec. 1974; released in 1977
113	Secrets from the Sun	Joe Lee Wilson	rec. ca. 1977
114	Parisian Concert, vol. 1	Archie Shepp	rec. 1977; later issued as Impro 01
116	Ghilgoul	Yochk'O Seffer	rec. ca. 1978
117	Parisian Concert, vol. 2	Archie Shepp	rec. 1977; later issued as Impro 03
118	[Live in Europe?]	Archie Shepp	rec. 1979; later issued as Impro 05
119	[Invitation?]	Archie Shepp with Siegfried Kessler Trio	rec. 1979; later issued as Impro 04
01	Few Comin' Thru	Bobby Few	rec. 770929
02	Shouting the blues	Frank Wright, George Arvantias	rec. 771212
03	The Shout / Portrait from a Small Woman	Alan Silva	rec. 7811
04	Kevin My Dear Son	Frank Wright	rec. 7810
COTW001	Center of the World	Frank Wright Quartet	rec. 720526
COTW002	Last Polka in Nancy?	Frank Wright Quartet	rec. 731010
COTW003	More or Less Few	Bobby Few	rec. 7311
COTW004	Adieu Little Man	Frank Wright & Muhammad Ali	rec. 7404
COTW005	Inner Song	Alan Silva	rec. 7409

== See also ==
- List of record labels
- Sun Records (Memphis) Tennessee based company of the same name
- Sun Records (other companies) Other record companies of the same name
