= Noah Howard Quartet =

Studio album by Noah Howard
- Released: 1966
- Recorded: January 1966
- Studio: New York City
- Genre: Free jazz
- Length: 29:35
- Label: ESP-Disk; 1031

Noah Howard chronology
Noah Howard Quartet (1966)	At Judson Hall (1968)

Noah Howard Quartet is the debut album by alto saxophonist Noah Howard. It was recorded in New York City during January 1966, and was released later that year by ESP-Disk. On the album, Howard is joined by trumpeter Ric Colbeck, bassist Scotty Holt, and percussionist Dave Grant.

== Reception ==
Professional ratings
Review scores
Source	Rating
AllMusic	3/5 stars
The Penguin Guide to Jazz	3/4 stars
The Encyclopedia of Popular Music	3/5 stars

In a review for AllMusic, Michael G. Nastos called the album a "pivotal recording in the development of early avant garde jazz," and wrote: "Howard proves himself as an innovator who boldly goes where Ornette Coleman, Marion Brown, or Frank Wright did not fear to tread. His alto saxophone sound and ideas clearly mirror Coleman, reaching for upper atmospheric, warp signatures, and also playing warm lyrical phrases... This is... a stark reminder of how he was in on the ground floor of this progressive movement."

The authors of The Penguin Guide to Jazz Recordings stated that Howard's sound at this point in his career was "different and idiosyncratic, but not yet fully realized," but praised the gentle "And About Love".

The Guardian's John Fordham noted that the album "was explicitly connected to the Coltrane/Coleman lineage, but also exhibited the mixture of Ayler's anguished soulfulness and an unexpectedly tender folksiness that would be Howard's signature sound."

A writer for Stereogum described the album as "a major statement, an oft-overlooked gem in the ESP-Disk catalog," and commented: "His music... has a compelling energy that never erupts into the kind of screaming frenzy that was rapidly becoming the cliché of free jazz. Instead, it makes a far subtler statement."

== Track listing ==
All compositions by Noah Howard.

1. "Henry's Street" – 7:20
2. "Apotheosis" – 6:51
3. "Apotheosis Extension I" – 8:17
4. "And About Love" – 7:07

== Personnel ==
- Noah Howard – alto saxophone
- Ric Colbeck – trumpet
- Scotty Holt – bass
- Dave Grant – percussion
