= Burnt Sugar (band) =

American improvisational band

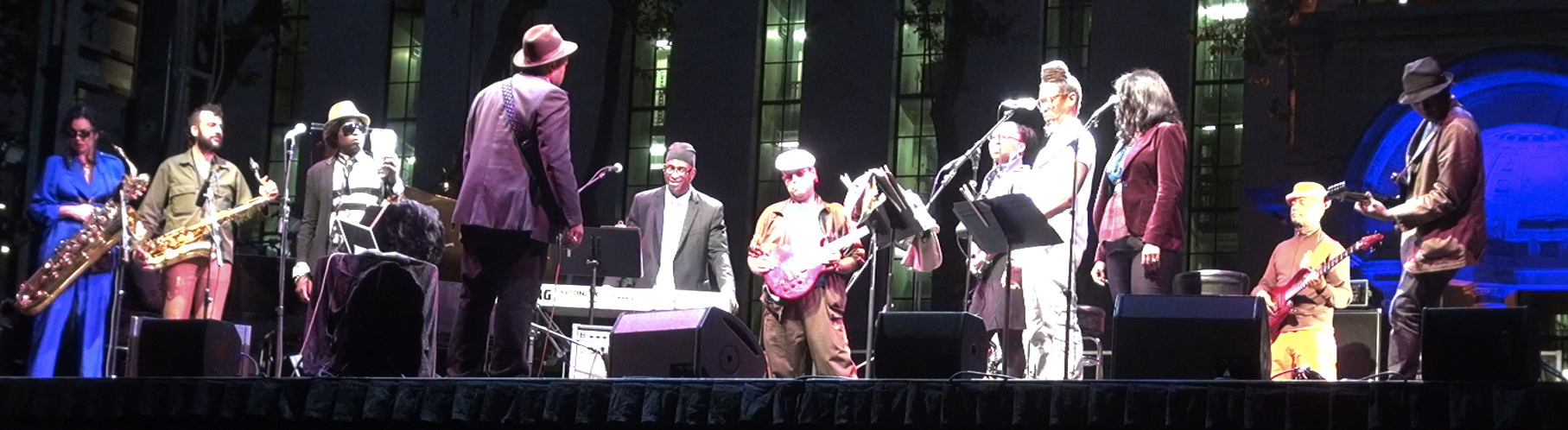
- Burnt Sugar at Bryant Park in 2011

Background information
- Also known as: Burnt Sugar the Arkestra Chamber
- Origin: United States
- Genre: Free improvisation
- Years active: 1999–present
- Past members: Greg Tate

Burnt Sugar, also known as Burnt Sugar the Arkestra Chamber, is an American improvisational band. The band's music combines the influences of funk, jazz, rock, reggae, soul, hip hop, heavy metal, and 20th-century classical music. It has been described by one critic as a "funk-rock-electronic-samba-soul-jazz-fusion-whatever ensemble". One critic wrote that Burnt Sugar's music "is not the easiest thing to describe", while another critic wrote that "Burnt Sugar sounds like a big cloud".

== History ==
Burnt Sugar was founded in 1999 by guitarist and writer Greg Tate. Among the band's influences are Bitches Brew-era Miles Davis, Funkadelic, Bad Brains, Band of Gypsys, Sun Ra, Herbie Hancock's Mwandishi, and Material.

=== Group members ===
The membership of Burnt Sugar is fluid. As many as 40 musicians have passed through the band and are available to play with it, although the group's core consists of about 12 musicians. Notable musicians who have played with Burnt Sugar include guitarists Pete Cosey, who played in Davis' band during the early 1970s, and Vernon Reid, guitarist for the funk metal band Living Colour. Other members of the group have included pianist Vijay Iyer, saxophonists Avram Fefer, Carl Hancock Rux, Matana Roberts, and trumpeter Lewis "Flip" Barnes.

=== Origin ===
The founding members of the group—Vijay Iyer and Bruce Mack on keyboards, Rene Akhan, Morgan Craft and Kirk Douglas (now of The Roots) on guitars, Jared Michael Nickerson and Jason Di Matteo on electric and acoustic bass, Swiss Chris and Qasim Naqvi on drums, vocalist Eisa Davis and violinist Simi—began rehearsing together in late August 1999, making their debut at CBGB. In December 1999, they recorded the group's debut album, Blood On The Leaf.

=== Conduction ===
Tate served as Burnt Sugar's leader, using a system called "conduction" to direct the musicians as they improvise. Conduction, which was developed by Butch Morris, is a series of hand and baton signals that cue various musical themes or musicians. Tate said that under conduction, "the band becomes the instrument of the conductor's will." He has described his role as conductor as:

akin to Mickey Mouse in the "Sorcerer's Apprentice" section of Fantasia. Diddling with forces he doesn't quite understand, snapping his fingers, opening the floodgates, occasioning a deluge. Drowning the room in the music of African ascent.

=== Recordings ===
In 2000, Burnt Sugar recorded a three-CD set, That Depends On What You Know, made up of the discs Fubractive Since Antiquity, The Crepescularium and The Sirens Return: Keep It Real ’Til It Flatlines. By that time, the band included trumpeter Lewis “Flip” Barnes, percussionist Tia Nicole Leak, saxophonist Micah Gaugh, flautist Satch Hoyt, bass guitarist Maximina Juson, cellist Julia Kent, and vocalists Lisala Beatty and Justice Dilla-X.

Burnt Sugar’s next studio recording, the two-CD set Black Sex Yall Liberation And Bloody Random Violets, was released in 2004. It featured the band debut of alto saxophonist Matana Roberts and tenor saxophonist Petre Radu-Scafaru. That was followed in 2005 by Not April In Paris, their first live album, documenting a fully improvised 80-minute concert from the Banlieues Bleues Festival in France. In 2006, they released a two-CD live set, If You Can't Dazzle Them With Your Brilliance Then Baffle Them With Your Blisluth, recorded at shows in Bordeaux, France; San Sebastien, Spain; and at Tonic and the Vision Festival in New York City.

That same year, the band released another two-CD studio set, More Than Posthuman: Rise Of The Mojosexual Cotillion, which was more focused on vocals, lyrics, and dance rhythms than their previous work. The band finished 2006 by releasing Chopped And Screwed Volume 2 – Rarities, Remixes, Out Takes And Conductions (there was no Volume 1), with excerpts from More Than Posthuman, new collaborations with Butch Morris, and laptop music from Greg Tate’s score for his sci-fi film project Black Body Radiation.

In 2007, the group released a best-of collection featuring material from all 12 of their discs, and another live album, Live at Minnegiggle Falls, recorded at Minneapolis’ Walker Arts Center in 2005. In 2008, Burnt Sugar provided a live soundtrack to Oscar Micheaux's silent film In Our Gates at Lincoln Center and released the studio album Making Love To The Dark Ages in partnership with LiveWired Records. In 2011, they released the studio album All Ya Needs That Negrocity.

In 2013, Burnt Sugar contributed several tracks to a benefit album to raise funds for Donovan Drayton's release from prison and forthcoming trial. In 2017, they released their latest studio album, All You Zombies Dig The Luminosity!. In 2019, Burnt Sugar presented the film Sweet Sweetback's Baadasssss Song in Brooklyn while playing their own interpretation of the soundtrack. Van Peebles appeared at the presentation.

== Discography ==
- Blood on the Leaf: Opus No. 1 (2000)
- That Depends on What You Know 1: The Sirens Return / Keep It Real 'Til It Flatlines (2001)
- That Depends on What You Know 2: The Crepescularium (2001)
- That Depends on What You Know 3: Fubractive Since Antiquity Suite (2001)
- Black Sex Yall Liberation & Bloody Random Violets (2003)
- The Rites: Conductions Inspired by Stravinsky's Le Sacre du Printemps (2003)
- Not April in Paris: Live from Banlieus Bleues (2004)
- If You Can't Dazzle Them With Your Brilliance, Then Baffle Them With Your Blisluth (2005)
- More Than Posthuman: Rise of the Mojosexual Cotillion (2006)
- Burnt Sugar Chopped and Screwed Volume 2 (2006)
- Live from Minnegiggle Falls (2007)
- Burnt Sugar Vs. The Dominatrix (2007)
- Never Been Kissed: The Groidest Shiznits 1999–2006 (2007)
- Making Love to the Dark Ages (2009)
- All Ya Needs That Negrocity (2011)
- All You Zombies Dig the Luminosity! (2017)
- Angels Over Oakanda (2021)
