= Red Star (Noah Howard album) =

Studio album by Noah Howard featuring Kenny Clarke
- Released: 1977
- Recorded: May 16, 1977
- Studios: Studio Clarens-Vincennes, Paris, France
- Genres: Bebop, free jazz
- Length: 43:02
- Labels: Mercury; 9101 903
- Producer: Noah Howard

Noah Howard chronology
Live in Europe, Volume 1 (1975)	Red Star (1977)	Berlin Concert (1977)

Red Star is an album by alto saxophonist Noah Howard on which he is joined by drummer Kenny Clarke. It was recorded in Paris on May 16, 1977, and was released later that year by Mercury Records. The album also features trumpeter Richard Williams, pianist Bobby Few, and bassist Guy Pederson.

== Reception ==
Professional ratings
Review scores
Source	Rating
AllMusic	3/5 stars
The Encyclopedia of Popular Music	3/5 stars
The Penguin Guide to Jazz	3/4 stars

In a review for AllMusic, Eugene Chadbourne wrote: "Followers of jazz who sometimes wince at the constant bickering between this scene and that, modern or moldy, fusion or free, can all take heart in a recording such as this one. A saxophonist more known on the free scene comes together with one of the great bop drummers. The band surrounding them contains players that are comfortable in both contexts, and the material winds up having the rhythmic sway of traditional swing harnessed with the energetic power of free jazz."

The authors of The Penguin Guide to Jazz Recordings called the album "a fascinating meeting of styles," and stated: "The sound is excellent... and the empathy within the group is deeply impressive."

Author John Litweiler, writing for JazzTimes, praised the title track, noting that, despite the "Coltranelike theme," "the lighter sound of the alto, the bright sound of the very active Clarke's drums and Few's avoidance of Tyner trademarks... keep this from sounding like a Coltrane group."

Glenn Astarita of All About Jazz described the album as an "interesting and impeccably recorded outing," and commented: "listeners familiar with Clarke's now historical Bop legacy might be surprised to hear the drummer engage in a bit of genre busting, thanks to his rather spirited approach to free jazz drumming on the title piece." AAJ's Derek Taylor remarked: "this is vintage Howard and with the added allure of Clarke in what many might view as an unexpected setting it makes for an exciting listening experience."

Writing for One Final Note, Joe Milazzo called the album "an important transitional work in Howard's steadily growing oeuvre, one that points simultaneously to both his past and his future," and stated: "Red Star, like all his recordings... discloses Howard to be an artist... all too conscious of what it means to be the traveler, the outsider. In the absence of a true lingua franca, Howard's facility with several tongues enables him to move with real freedom, and across borders."

== Track listing ==
All compositions by Noah Howard.

1. "Creole Girl" – 8:00
2. "Lovers" – 8:00
3. "Red Star" – 20:00

== Personnel ==
- Noah Howard – alto saxophone
- Richard Williams – trumpet
- Bobby Few – piano
- Guy Pederson – bass
- Kenny Clarke – drums
