= 'Bout Soul =

Studio album by Jackie McLean
- Released: January 1969
- Recorded: September 8, 1967
- Studio: Van Gelder Studio, Englewood Cliffs, NJ
- Genre: Free jazz
- Length: 41:05
- Label: Blue Note; BST 84284
- Producer: Francis Wolff

Jackie McLean chronology
| New and Old Gospel (1967) | 'Bout Soul (1969) | Demon's Dance (1967) |

'Bout Soul is an album by American saxophonist Jackie McLean recorded in 1967 and released on the Blue Note label. It features McLean in a quintet with trumpeter Woody Shaw, pianist LaMont Johnson, bassist Scotty Holt and drummer Rashied Ali. Trombonist Grachan Moncur III guests on three tracks, and Barbara Simmons recites the words on "Soul".

== Reception ==
The AllMusic review by Stephen Thomas Erlewine stated:

This is intensely cerebral music that is nevertheless played with a fiery passion. Although the music was all composed, it is played as if it was invented on the spot. Fans of McLean's straight-ahead hard bop, or even of his adventurous mid-'60s sessions, might find this a little off-putting at first, but 'Bout Soul rewards close listening. It is one of McLean's finest modern contemporary sessions

— Erlewine, S. T. Allmusic Review

Professional ratings
Review scores
| Source | Rating |
|---|---|
| Allmusic | 4.5/5 stars |
| DownBeat | 4.5/5 stars |
| The Rolling Stone Jazz Record Guide | 3/5 stars |

== Track listing ==
1. "Soul" (Grachan Moncur III, Barbara Simmons) - 10:17
2. "Conversion Point" (Jackie McLean) - 9:47
3. "Big Ben's Voice" (LaMont Johnson) - 10:08
4. "Dear Nick, Dear John" (Scotty Holt) - 4:56
5. "Erdu" (Johnson) - 5:57
6. "Big Ben's Voice" [Alternate take] - 9:55 Bonus track on CD reissue

== Personnel ==
- Jackie McLean – alto saxophone
- Woody Shaw – trumpet (tracks 1–3, 5 & 6)
- Grachan Moncur III – trombone (tracks 1, 2 & 5)
- LaMont Johnson – piano
- Scotty Holt – bass
- Rashied Ali – drums
- Barbara Simmons – recitation (track 1)
