= Blues for Albert Ayler =

2012 live album by saxophonist Frank Wright

Live album by Frank Wright
- Released: 2012
- Recorded: July 17, 1974
- Venue: Ali's Alley, New York City
- Genre: Free jazz
- Length: 1:14:32
- Label: ESP-Disk; ESP 4068

Frank Wright chronology
Unity (2006)	Blues for Albert Ayler (2012)

Blues for Albert Ayler is a live album by saxophonist Frank Wright. It was recorded at Ali's Alley in New York City on July 17, 1974, and was released in 2012 by ESP-Disk. On the album, Wright is joined by guitarist James Blood Ulmer, bassist Benny Wilson, and drummer Rashied Ali.

== Reception ==
Professional ratings
Review scores
Source	Rating
AllMusic	4/5 stars
PopMatters	7/10 stars
All About Jazz	4.5/5 stars
All About Jazz	3.5/5 stars

In a review for AllMusic, Sean Westergaard wrote: "It's a blowing session for sure, with everyone getting plenty of solo space, but it's not an all-out firestorm. There's a theme that they return to throughout and Wright comes from a jump blues background and even his outside playing is informed by that... This is a great, historic session captured in surprisingly excellent sound that we're lucky to have."

Matthew Fiander of PopMatters stated: "this set crackles with energy. It is equal parts ode to Ayler's uncanny style and sound and an impressive display of the power of Wright's own quartet... an impressive set, one that pays tribute to one of the great jazz eccentrics and manages to show its own personality at the same time."

Point of Departure's Stuart Broomer called the recording "forceful, committed, incendiary music," and commented: "While the ritual may be predictable, it's still powerful. Wright and Ulmer are very effective in their first meeting, Ulmer's largely tonal playing anchoring the blues impulse so strong in Wright's own, and Ali's performance simply masterful, a force of nature initiating, driving, filling, and completing the music throughout."

Writing for All About Jazz, John Sharpe remarked: "Although the sound is slightly distant, it passes muster for a live date of this vintage, with every instrument distinct and audible... the set easily merits release and forms a substantive if belated addition to the discography of Wright."

Raul Da Gama stated that "the notes that shoot out of [Wright's] horn come in intense purple bursts that assault the minds ear in quantum packets of energy that sear the eye with their blue light from heaven's gate... As the musicians reach the dénouement of this suite its beauty is announced as if a holy communion has been shared with the spirits up above in this spectacular and unforgettable homage to the great Albert Ayler."

Mike Shanley of Jazz Times wrote that the album "might not maintain focus from beginning to end, but it doesn't spare on energy, which almost carries through... Ulmer plays with a manic freedom that still has a blues undercurrent. Ali sounds propulsive as ever. Wright is a capable player, building simple lines almost like John Coltrane, blowing some gutbucket wails at either end of his instrument’s range."

In a review for Culture Catch, Steve Holtje commented: "The fiery power of this quartet is astounding... Blues for Albert Ayler is proof that there are still musical treasures to be unearthed."

Bird is the Worm's Dave Sumner remarked: "It's an album that's best appreciated for its raw emotional power, the ferocity and perseverance of the artists through the long performance given, without pause, and the unbridled desire to conjure up everything they had and show it to the world... Archival finds like this should be treasured."

== Track listing ==
Composed by Frank Wright.

1. "Part 1" – 12:49
2. "Part 2" – 5:10
3. "Part 3" – 14:34
4. "Part 4" – 12:12
5. "Part 5" – 23:57
6. "Part 6" – 5:47

== Personnel ==
- Frank Wright – tenor saxophone, flute, vocals
- James Blood Ulmer – guitar
- Benny Wilson – bass
- Rashied Ali – drums
