= The All Seeing Eye =

Studio album by Wayne Shorter
- Released: April 1966
- Recorded: October 15, 1965
- Studios: Van Gelder, Englewood Cliffs
- Genres: Post-bop, avant-garde jazz
- Length: 44:19
- Labels: Blue Note; BST 84219
- Producer: Alfred Lion

Wayne Shorter chronology
Speak No Evil (1966)	The All Seeing Eye (1966)	Adam's Apple (1967)

Professional ratings
Review scores
Source	Rating
AllMusic	4.5/5 stars
Penguin Guide to Jazz	3.5/4 stars
The Rolling Stone Jazz Record Guide	5/5 stars

The All Seeing Eye is the ninth jazz album by saxophonist Wayne Shorter, recorded on October 15, 1965, and released on the Blue Note label as BLP 4219 and BST 84219 in 1966. The album features performances by Shorter with trumpeter Freddie Hubbard, trombonist Grachan Moncur III, alto saxophonist James Spaulding, pianist Herbie Hancock, bassist Ron Carter and drummer Joe Chambers. Shorter's brother, Alan composed and plays fluegelhorn on the final track, “Mephistopheles”. The AllMusic review by Scott Yanow states: "it is clear from the start that the music on this CD reissue is not basic bop and blues... the dramatic selections, and their brand of controlled freedom has plenty of subtle surprises. This is stimulating music that still sounds fresh over three decades later".

== Album conception ==
In the album's original liner notes, Shorter explains that the album was conceived as an attempt to depict the meaning of life, existence and the nature of God and the universe. In the long interview with Nat Hentoff, the saxophonist mentions the meanings of each piece, which will be hereby shortly summarized: "The All Seeing Eye" depicts the ubiquitous eye of God; "the solos, moreover, depict the machinery involved in the process of creation". "Genesis" obviously refers to the creation of all things; if the first part mostly consists in free tempo phrases, it "goes into 4/4 straight time to indicate that everything is beginning to settle down". Shorter further explains that he tried to give "Genesis" an open-endedness feeling "because, once begun, the creative process keeps going". "Chaos" reflects "wars, disagreements and the difficulty men have in understanding each other", whilst "Face of the Deep", a ballad in a minor key – the more cohesive piece of the album -, mirrors God bethinking on His creation. Shorter meant the composition as hopeful. The closing piece, "Mephistopheles", is a composition by Wayne's older brother Alan, and it emphasizes the ominous presence of evil; Wayne notes: "At the end, that loud, high climax can be taken as a scream. If you consort with the Devil, and are fooled by his unpredictability, that scream is a measure of the price you pay [...] and you are consigned to an eternity of torture, fire and brimstone".

== Track listing ==
All compositions by Wayne Shorter, except where indicated.

1. "The All Seeing Eye" – 10:32
2. "Genesis" – 11:44
3. "Chaos" – 6:56
4. "Face of the Deep" – 5:29
5. "Mephistopheles" (Alan Shorter) – 9:40

== Personnel ==
- Wayne Shorter – tenor saxophone
- Freddie Hubbard – trumpet, flugelhorn
- Grachan Moncur III – trombone
- James Spaulding – alto saxophone
- Herbie Hancock – piano
- Ron Carter – bass
- Joe Chambers – drums
- Alan Shorter – flugelhorn (track 5)

== Charts ==
Chart performance for The All Seeing Eye
Chart (2021)	Peak position
Belgian Albums (Ultratop Wallonia)	194
German Albums (Offizielle Top 100)	68
Scottish Albums (Official Charts)	98
