= Orgasm (Alan Shorter album) =

Studio album by Alan Shorter
- Released: 1969
- Recorded: September 23 & 25 and November 6, 1968; A&R Studios, NYC
- Genre: Jazz
- Length: 48:34
- Label: Verve; V6 8768
- Producer: Esmond Edwards

Alan Shorter chronology
| Orgasm (1969) | Tes Esat (1970) |

Orgasm is an album by jazz hornist Alan Shorter recorded in 1968 and released on the Verve label. It was also released under the title Parabolic during the same year in the UK.

== Reception ==
Professional ratings
Review scores
| Source | Rating |
|---|---|
| AllMusic | 4.5/5 stars |
| The Penguin Guide to Jazz Recordings | 3.5/4 stars |

AllMusic rated the album 4½ stars and its review by Scott Yanow states, "Shorter, although not a virtuoso, comes up with consistently inventive ideas. The style is sometimes slightly reminiscent of Ornette Coleman (partly due to the presence of Haden), but Shorter had apparently not heard Ornette's band before recording this music. Well worth several listens".

David Grundy of Point of Departure called the album Shorter's "definitive statement" of the period, and noted that "the record has an utterly distinctive atmosphere... 'sinister' is the operative word, an atmosphere drawing, perhaps, from Alan's love of the ambiguous spaces of horror and science-fiction movies – spaces of waiting, of threat, of tension and anticipation, or of sorrow."

Amiri Baraka wrote: "It is a music meant to shake, to stir, to arouse. To call for a 'new dispensation,' perhaps, of the whole order of things." He praised the "total sound and conception and burning energy" of the musicians, and remarked: "There is a freshness to this music that makes you listen... till the last eerie passage."

== Track listing ==
All compositions by Alan Shorter

1. "Parabola"- 13:07
2. "Joseph" - 3:07
3. "Straits of Blagellan" - 7:27
4. "Rapids" - 9:30
5. "Outeroids"- 4:15
6. "Orgasm" - 11:20

== Personnel ==
- Alan Shorter - flugelhorn
- Gato Barbieri - tenor saxophone
- Charlie Haden (tracks 1 & 6) Reggie Johnson (tracks 3 & 4) - bass
- Muhammad Ali (tracks 1 & 6), Rashied Ali (tracks 2–5) - drums
