= Frank Wright Trio =

Studio album by Frank Wright
- Released: 1966
- Recorded: November 11, 1965
- Studio: New York City
- Genre: free jazz
- Length: 33:57
- Label: ESP-Disk; 1023

Frank Wright chronology
Frank Wright Trio (1966)	Your Prayer (1967)

Frank Wright Trio is the debut album by saxophonist Frank Wright. It was recorded in November 1965 in New York City, released by ESP-Disk in 1966, and reissued on CD in 1992. On the album, Wright is joined by bassist Henry Grimes and drummer Tom Price. The tracks were also reissued in 2005 on the Frank Wright compilation The Complete ESP-Disk Recordings.

ESP-Disk founder Bernard Stollman recalled the origins of the album: "John Coltrane was playing with his quartet at the Village Gate during the Christmas holiday. I was greatly impressed by the playing of a guest artist, a saxophonist. When the set ended, I approached and complimented him on his playing. I asked who he was. He said, 'I'm Frank Wright, from Cleveland.' 'Do you have a record label?' 'Oh no, I'm not on any record label.' I said, 'Well, you are now.' He'd been pressing pants in a dry cleaning shop in Cleveland before he came to New York. Shortly afterwards, he formed a group and went into the studio."

== Reception ==
Professional ratings
Review scores
Source	Rating
AllMusic	4/5 stars
The Penguin Guide to Jazz	3.5/4 stars

In a review of the CD reissue for AllMusic, Scott Yanow wrote: "All of tenor saxophonist Frank Wright's recordings can be considered a bit of a blowout. For his debut as a leader, Wright... rips into three of his originals: 'The Earth,' 'The Moon' and 'Jerry.' Due to the brevity of this CD reissue..., his follow-up ESP date Your Prayer gets the edge, but both are easily recommended to open-eared listeners who enjoy hearing fiery sound explorations."

In an article for All About Jazz, Clifford Allen commented: "Wright... was one of the forerunners of the multiphonics-driven school of saxophonists to follow the direction pointed by Ayler, but with a more pronounced bar-walking influence than most of his contemporaries. Whereas Ayler's high-pitched wails, wide vibrato and guttural honks all belied an R&B pedigree, his solos still contained the breakneck tempos and facility of bebop... Wright, on the other hand, offers his honks and squawks with a phraseology derived from the slower, earthier funk of R&B and gospel music... The opening 'The Earth' starts with a brief vibrato-heavy and bluesy slow theme on unaccompanied tenor that quickly erupts into a frantic screamer of a solo, a mix of buzzing upper-register cries and low bleating honks, occasional recognizable stock R&B phrases making their way into the melange... Unlike Ayler, there is not a significant amount of solo construction, for it appears Wright was throwing together ideas in a spirit of jubilation. The rhythm section is certainly strong and experienced, and are given ample duet room after Wright's solo ends."

== Track listing ==
All compositions by Frank Wright.

1. "The Earth" – 7:35
2. "Jerry" – 11:50
3. "The Moon" – 14:32

== Personnel ==
- Frank Wright – tenor saxophone
- Henry Grimes – bass
- Tom Price – drums
