= Olu Iwa =

Live album by Cecil Taylor
- Released: 1987
- Recorded: April 12, 1986
- Genre: Free jazz
- Length: 75:33
- Label: Soul Note

Cecil Taylor chronology
For Olim (1986)	Olu Iwa (1987)	Live in Bologna (1987)

Olu Iwa is a live album by Cecil Taylor recorded in Berlin, Germany on April 12, 1986, and released on the Soul Note label. The album features a concert performance by Taylor with Thurman Barker, William Parker and Steve McCall with Earl McIntyre, Peter Brötzmann and Frank Wright added on one track.

== Reception ==
Professional ratings
Review scores
Source	Rating
AllMusic	4.5/5 stars
The Penguin Guide to Jazz Recordings	4/4 stars

The AllMusic review by Ron Wynn states, "The opening 48-minute dialogue included the high-register wailing of tenor saxophonists Peter Brotzmann and Frank Wright and Taylor's undulating answering lines and sprawling solos. The second piece was a bit shorter..., but no less ambitious, with shifting moods, themes and tempos. As usual, Taylor's music wasn't for the squeamish or those who desire nicely ordered, predictable material. It required intense concentration and attention from both performers and audience".

Gary Giddins wrote that on Olu Iwa, Taylor "has a band unified primarily by its rhythm, suggesting at times an Africa-inspired percussion group or a Basie-inspired rhythm section interlude, depending on your frame of reference. Taylor interacts and blends with Thurman Barker on marimba and the ingeniously volatile Steve McCall on drums. Taylor's inherent understanding of jazz's ebullient power comes to the fore in the second half of 'B Ee Ba Nganga Ban'a Eee!' with a paint-peeling solo by Peter Brotzmann and the tailgate slide of Earl McIntyre.

The authors of The Penguin Guide to Jazz Recordings commented: "Some of the music... has one reflecting on Taylor's... history: the presence of Barker's marimba harks back to Earl Griffith on the ancient Looking Ahead!, and the small group with horns reminds one of Unit Structures. But the two sprawling pieces here... have moved far on from those days. Alternately hymnal, purgatorial, intensely concentrated and wildly abandoned, the first theme is a carefully organized yet unfettered piece that again disproves Taylor's isolation... The second... is if anything more fervent, with the quartet... playing at full stretch. Another great one."

== Track listing ==
All compositions by Cecil Taylor.

1. "B Ee Ba Nganga Ban'a Eee!" - 48:21
2. "Olu Iwa (Lord Of Character)" - 27:09

- Recorded in Berlin, Germany on April 11, 1986

== Personnel ==
- Cecil Taylor: piano
- Thurman Barker: marimba, percussion
- William Parker: bass
- Steve McCall: drums
- Earl McIntyre: trombone (track 1)
- Peter Brötzmann: tenor saxophone, tárogató (track 1)
- Frank Wright: tenor saxophone (track 1)
