= Center of the World (album) =

Live album by Frank Wright Quartet
- Released: 1972
- Recorded: March 26, 1972
- Venue: Doelen, Rotterdam
- Genre: Jazz
- Length: 39:36; 70:19 (Fractal reissue)
- Label: Center of the World

Frank Wright chronology
Church Number Nine (1971)	Center of the World (1972)	Last Polka in Nancy? (1973)

Center of the World is an album by the Frank Wright Quartet, consisting of saxophonist Frank Wright, pianist Bobby Few, bassist Alan Silva and drummer Muhammad Ali. It was recorded live in 1972 and released on the French Center of the World label. The album was reissued on CD in 1999 by Fractal with two previously unreleased performances from a 1978 reunion.

== Reception ==
Professional ratings
Review scores
Source	Rating
AllMusic	4.5/5 stars

In his review for AllMusic, Thom Jurek states "While Wright is the leader of the ensemble and was capable of blowing the hell out of his horn, the true star on these sessions is Few, who joined Steve Lacy's Sextet upon departure from this group."

Writing for Cadence, Derek Taylor called the album "revelatory," offering "undeniable evidence of the Reverend Frank Wright's rightful place in the pantheon of early free Jazz forefathers."

A reviewer for The Wire stated that Wright's sideman are "capable of chasing and sometimes even outpacing his ever accelerating squeals," and described the album as a "high-energy apex, with Bobby Few's delicately tumbling piano transporting Wright's bluesy wailing to regions of non-stop organic flux, where the music scales peak after peak."

== Track listing ==
1. "Center of the World, Part 1" (Wright, Silva, Few) – 19:51
2. "Center of the World, Part 2" (Wright, Silva, Few) – 19:45

Bonus tracks on Fractal reissue CD Recorded live 1978 at Neue Anta, Detmold

3. "No End" (Wright) – 17:32
4. "Church Number 9" (Wright) – 13:11

== Personnel ==
- Frank Wright – tenor saxophone, soprano sax, voice
- Bobby Few – piano, voice
- Alan Silva – bass, cello, voice
- Muhammad Ali – drums, voice
