= Phase One (Art Ensemble of Chicago album) =

Studio album by Art Ensemble of Chicago
- Released: 1971
- Recorded: February 1971
- Studio: Paris, France
- Genre: Jazz
- Length: 42:26
- Label: America; 30 AM 6117

Art Ensemble of Chicago chronology
Art Ensemble of Chicago with Fontella Bass (1970)	Phase One (1971)	Live at Mandell Hall (1972)

Phase One is an album by the Art Ensemble of Chicago recorded in Paris in February 1971 and originally released on the French America label then reissued in the US on Prestige Records the following year. It features Lester Bowie, Joseph Jarman, Roscoe Mitchell, Malachi Favors Maghostut and Don Moye performing two side-long pieces dedicated to John Coltrane and Albert Ayler respectively.

== Reception ==
Jim Miller's Rolling Stone review stated "The Art Ensemble of Chicago plays a music steeped in the black American musical tradition and its African heritage. They offer the rare spectacle of an intrinsically historical yet wholly contemporary jazz. Phase One marks one of the year's jazz events on record; more indelibly than Bap-Tizum it captures the quintessence of this extraordinary group." The Allmusic review by Thom Jurek states "This is one of the least well-known recordings by the AEC, but it is also one of their most enduring and a true high mark from their Paris period".

Professional ratings
Review scores
Source	Rating
Allmusic	4.5/5 stars
The Rolling Stone Jazz Record Guide	4/5 stars

== Track listing ==
1. "Ohnedaruth" (Jarman) - 21:30
2. "Lebert Aaly .. dedicated to Albert Ayler" (Bowie, Mitchell, Jarman, Favors) - 20:56

== Personnel ==
- Lester Bowie: trumpet, flugelhorn, steer-horns, etc.
- Roscoe Mitchell: soprano, alto and bass saxophones, clarinets, flute, percussion
- Joseph Jarman: soprano, alto and tenor saxophones, clarinets, oboe, flutes, marimba, vibes, percussion
- Malachi Favors Maghostut: bass and electric bass, banjo, cythar, percussion
- Don Moye: drums, bass marimba, temple blocks, bells, etc
