= Your Prayer =

Studio album by Frank Wright
- Released: 1967
- Recorded: May 1967
- Studio: New York City
- Genre: Free jazz
- Length: 51:38
- Label: ESP-Disk; 1053

Frank Wright chronology
Frank Wright Trio (1966)	Your Prayer (1967)	Uhuru na Umoja (1970)

Your Prayer is the second album by saxophonist Frank Wright. It was recorded in May 1967 in New York City and was released by ESP-Disk later that year. On the album, Wright is joined by saxophonist Arthur Jones, trumpeter Jacques Coursil, bassist Steve Tintweiss, and drummer Muhammad Ali. The tracks were reissued in 2005 on the Frank Wright compilation The Complete ESP-Disk Recordings.

== Reception ==
Professional ratings
Review scores
Source	Rating
AllMusic	4.5/5 stars

In a review for AllMusic, Scott Yanow wrote: "For his second and final ESP date as a leader, avant-garde tenor saxophonist Frank Wright teams up with four little-known players... for passionate explorations of four of his originals plus Jones' 'The Lady.' Rather intense at times, these emotional performances... still sound groundbreaking three decades later. One of Frank Wright's finest recordings."

Writing for Stereogum, Michael Nelson commented: "The other horns treat the melodies like fanfares, announcing Wright before he steps up for a fierce solo, but on pieces like 'No End' and particularly the nearly 13-minute 'Fire of Spirits,' everyone gets to have their say. Tintweiss's extended bass solo is actually a highlight of the disc, though the real secret weapon is Coursil's trumpet. Ali's drumming is frantic and ferocious throughout, wiping out the landscape like a forest fire."

In a review for All About Jazz, Clifford Allen stated: "Your Prayer finds Wright refining the bag his solos come from, yet maintaining a firm hold on the ecstatic free-blues shout that makes up most of his solo language... Your Prayer is a rather lengthy slab of high-energy grit, but its unified forward and upward motion make for a firmly rooted sonic liberation."

== Track listing ==
Track 1 by Arthur Jones. Tracks 2–5 by Frank Wright.

1. "The Lady" – 9:04
2. "Train Stop" – 7:32
3. "No End" – 6:49
4. "Fire of Spirits" – 12:31
5. "Your Prayer" – 15:42

== Personnel ==
- Frank Wright – tenor saxophone
- Arthur Jones – alto saxophone
- Jacques Coursil – trumpet
- Steve Tintweiss – bass
- Muhammad Ali – drums
