= Muhammad Ali (drummer) =

Free jazz drummer

- Birth name: Raymond Patterson
- Born: December 23, 1936 (age 88); Philadelphia, Pennsylvania, U.S.
- Genres: Free jazz
- Instrument: Drums

Muhammad Ali (born Raymond Patterson, December 23, 1936) is an American free jazz drummer.

== Early life ==
Ali was born and raised in Philadelphia where he, along with his father and brothers, converted to Islam. His older brother, Rashied Ali, was also a drummer.

== Career ==
He recorded with Albert Ayler in 1969 on the sessions released as Music Is the Healing Force of the Universe and The Last Album. Like many Jazz musicians of the 60's, he moved to Europe in 1969 along with Frank Wright, Noah Howard, and Bobby Few.

The Jazz Discography states that Ali participated in 26 recording sessions from 1967 to 1983.

In October 2006, Ali participated in a concert to celebrate John Coltrane's 80th birthday in his hometown of Philadelphia. Also featured were his brother, pianist Dave Burrell, and bassist Reggie Workman. He also played with alto saxophonist Noah Howard in the summer of 2008. In 2010, he recorded Planetary Unknown in a quartet led by David S. Ware, Ali's first recording in nearly thirty years.

== Discography ==
=== As sideman ===
With Idris Ackamoor, Rashied Al Akbar, and Earl Cross

- Ascent of the Nether Creatures (NoBusiness, 2014) recorded in 1980

With Albert Ayler

- Music Is the Healing Force of the Universe (Impulse!, 1969)
- The Last Album (Impulse!, 1971)
- Holy Ghost: Rare & Unissued Recordings (1962–70) (Revenant, 2004)

With Hans Dulfer

- El saxofón (Catfish, 1971)

With Bobby Few

- More or Less Few (Center of the World, 1973)
- Rhapsody in Few (Black Lion, 1983)

With Noah Howard

- The Black Ark (Freedom, 1971)
- Space Dimension (America, 1971)
- Live in Europe Vol. 1 (Sun, 1975)

With Steve Lacy

- Associates (Musica Jazz, 1996)

With Michel Pilz

- Jamabiko (M.P., 1984)

With Saheb Sarbib

- Live In Europe Vol 1 (Sasa, 1976)
- Live In Europe Vol 2 (Marge, 1976)

With Archie Shepp

- Pitchin Can (America, 1970)
- Coral Rock (America, 1973)
- Live At The Festival (Enja, 1975) (one track)
- Doodlin' (Inner City, 1976)

With Alan Shorter

- Orgasm (Verve, 1969)

With Alan Silva

- The Shout - Portrait for a Small Woman (Sun Records, 1979)

With David S. Ware

- Planetary Unknown (AUM Fidelity, 2011)
- Live at Jazzfestival Saalfelden 2011 (AUM Fidelity, 2012)

With Frank Wright

- Your Prayer (ESP-Disk, 1967)
- One for John (BYG, 1970)
- Church Number Nine (Odeon, 1971)
- Center of the World (Center of the World, 1972)
- Last Polka in Nancy? (Center of the World, 1973)
- Adieu, Little Man (Center of the World, 1974)
- For Example - Workshop Freie Musik 1969 - 1978 (FMP, 1978) (one track)
- The Complete ESP-Disk Recordings (ESP-Disk, 2005)
- Unity (ESP-Disk, 2006)

With Bobby Zankel

- Celebrating William Parker @ 65 (Not Two, 2017)
