= Last Polka in Nancy? =

Live album by Center of the World
- Released: 1973
- Recorded: October 10, 1973
- Venue: Nancy, France
- Genre: Jazz
- Length: 42:03; 61:00 (Fractal reissue)
- Label: Center of the World

Frank Wright chronology
Center of the World (1972)	Last Polka in Nancy? (1973)	Adieu Little Man (1974)

Last Polka in Nancy? is the second album by the free jazz quartet Center of the World, consisting of saxophonist Frank Wright, pianist Bobby Few, bassist Alan Silva and drummer Muhammad Ali. It was recorded live in 1973 at the Nancy Jazz Pulsations Festival and released on the French Center of the World label. The album was reissued on CD in 1999 by Fractal with a previously unreleased performance from a 1978 reunion.

== Reception ==
Professional ratings
Review scores
Source	Rating
AllMusic	4.5/5 stars

In his review for AllMusic, Thom Jurek states "This is a freewheeling exorcism of a set with spar but well placed dynamic sequences that accent all the textures possible when the boundaries to expression are gone."

Writing for Cadence, Derek Taylor called the album "revelatory," offering "undeniable evidence of the Reverend Frank Wright's rightful place in the pantheon of early free Jazz forefathers."

A reviewer for The Wire stated that, in comparison with Center of the World, Last Polka in Nancy? "is more satisfyingly diverse and challenging, allowing the soloists more space to spread out and develop some of their most beautiful, melancholic pieces."

== Track listing ==
1. "Winter Echoes" (Few) – 14:48
2. "Guanna Dance, Part 1" (Silva) – 4:04
3. "Guanna Dance, Part 2" (Silva) – 11:34
4. "Thinking of Monk" (Few) – 1:21
5. "Doing the Polka" (Few) – 10:16

Bonus track on Fractal reissue CD Recorded live 1978 at Neue Anta, Detmold

6. "Two Birds with One Stone" (Wright) – 18:57

== Personnel ==
- Frank Wright – tenor saxophone
- Bobby Few – piano
- Alan Silva – bass
- Muhammad Ali – drums
