= The Last Album =

Studio album by Albert Ayler
- Released: 1971
- Recorded: 1969
- Genre: Free jazz
- Length: 43:12
- Label: Impulse!

Albert Ayler chronology
Music Is the Healing Force of the Universe (1969)	The Last Album (1971)	Nuits de la Fondation Maeght Vol. 1 (1971)

Professional ratings
Review scores
Source	Rating
Allmusic	1.5/5 stars

The Last Album is an album by Albert Ayler recorded a little over a year before his death in November 1970. Along with Music Is the Healing Force of the Universe, which was recorded at the same session (August 26–29, 1969 at Plaza Sound Studios in New York), it was Ayler's last studio album. The Last Album consists of outtakes from that session, and was released posthumously (hence the title) in 1971 on Impulse! Records.

== Overview ==
The first track is an untitled improvisational duet between guitarist and Canned Heat member Henry Vestine and Ayler on bagpipe, but credited as "written" by Henry Vestine and Mary Parks. All other songwriting credits on the album are also claimed by Mary Parks.

The second track contains poetry spoken eloquently by Mary Parks, posing questions which Ayler's sax answers.

"Toiling" is a guitar-driven blues track.

On "Desert Blood", Ayler sings jazz-vocals reminiscent of June Tyson's performances with Sun Ra.

The remainder of the album is in the Free jazz idiom.

== Reception ==
In a review for AllMusic, Scott Yanow wrote: "this date is a bit infamous due to the R&Bish material and a few throwaway tracks. Albert Ayler.. plays bagpipes on a weird duet with the rock guitarist Henry Vestine, takes an odd vocal on 'Desert Blood,' backs Mary Maria's singing on 'Again Comes the Rising of the Sun' and does what he can on a few passionate but weak instrumentals; Ayler sounds as if he had definitely lost his way. This album is of more interest for its novelty value and historical importance than it is musically."

A review at PopMatters refers to the album as "a true kitchen sink wonder." The writer continues: "Even from the first note, you can tell this is going to be one hell of a strange album. It makes no attempt to evenly stir together an electric guitar/saxophone duet ('Untitled Duet'), a musical poetry mash-up with [Ayler's] then-girlfriend Mary Maria ('Again Comes the Rising of the Sun'), off-kilter blues ('Toiling'), an impressionistic vocal number that hardly reaches resolution ('Desert Blood') and a very, very stressed-out sounding ballad ('Water Music'). The Last Album is baffling, almost poetically so. You still feel the stretch of Ayler's musicality and personality within these tracks, even if it is all terribly unfocused."

Phil Freeman, writing for Burning Ambulance, commented that The Last Album is "easily the weirdest Ayler record, and all the more fascinating for its experimentalism... It's a mixed bag, but there's nothing really awful here, even if 'Desert Blood' is pretty hard going. And it does feel like a unified record rather than an odds 'n' ends compilation, even if it is the latter."

Tim Niland, in a review for All About Jazz, wrote: "I think it's amusing that people consider Ayler's The Last Album... to be a sellout. I mean it opens with an improvised duet for abstract electric guitar and bagpipes, for goodness sake. Mary Maria Parks' vocals are an acquired taste, but Ayler sounds fine backing her on 'Again Comes The Rising Of The Sun,' especially when breaking out on a caustic solo backed by Muhammad Ali's strong drumming. 'All Love' is quite beautiful, with Ayler playing tenor with great restraint and excellent accompaniment from Bobby Few on piano, and a strong bowed bass solo from Stafford James. 'Toiling' is the polar opposite, going into R&B territory with funky guitar and piano setting the stage for Ayler's strong blues drenched saxophone. 'Desert Blood' starts strong with ripe saxophone, but then goes off the rails with a overwrought vocal duet for Ayler and Parks before pulling it back together for some fine sax at the end. Ripe potent tenor saxophone opens 'The Birth of Mirth' building in strength and power over deep piano comping. 'Water Music' has a melancholy feel with bowed bass and poignant piano under Ayler's plangent saxophone. It's a haunting reminder of the power of his music."

== Track listing ==
1. Untitled Duet - 4:32
2. Again Comes The Rising Of The Sun - 6:52
3. All Love - 8:59
4. Toiling - 5:06
5. Desert Blood - 5:58
6. Birth Of Mirth - 5:20
7. Water Music - 6:10

== Personnel ==
- Albert Ayler – Saxophones, Bagpipes
- Henry Vestine – Electric Guitar
- Bobby Few – Piano
- Stafford James – Bass
- Bill Folwell – Fender Bass
- Muhammad Ali – Drums
- Mary Maria – Vocals
- Ed Michel – Producer
