= Frank Wright (jazz musician) =

American jazz saxophonist (1935–1990)

- Born: July 9, 1935; Grenada, Mississippi, U.S.
- Origin: Cleveland, Ohio, U.S.
- Died: May 17, 1990 (aged 54) Cologne, West Germany
- Genre: Jazz
- Instruments: Tenor saxophone, vocals

Frank Wright (July 9, 1935 – May 17, 1990) was an American free jazz musician, known for his frantic style of playing the tenor saxophone. Critics often compare his music to that of Albert Ayler, although Wright "offers his honks and squawks with a phraseology derived from the slower, earthier funk of R&B and gospel music." According to AllMusic biographer Chris Kelsey, Wright "never recorded even a single record under his own name for a major label; he was 'underground' his entire career." In addition to tenor saxophone, Wright also played the soprano saxophone and bass clarinet.

== Biography ==
Wright was born in Grenada, Mississippi, United States, and grew up in Memphis, Tennessee and Cleveland, Ohio, where he began his musical career playing bass guitar, backing artists such as Rosco Gordon, Bobby "Blue" Bland, and B.B. King. He switched to tenor saxophone after meeting Albert Ayler in Cleveland, Ayler's hometown. In 1964, Wright moved to New York City, where he played with Larry Young, Noah Howard, and Sunny Murray. He also sat in with John Coltrane and, in early 1965, was invited to participate in the recording of Ascension, but reportedly felt that his skills were not up to the demands of the music. Later, however, Wright stated: "what I do is countersigned by master John Coltrane who accepted me at this side by calling me 'little brother'."

In late 1965, Wright recorded Frank Wright Trio, his first album as a leader, for ESP-Disk with Henry Grimes on bass and Tom Price on drums. (According to Bernard Stollman, founder of ESP-Disk, the record came about when he approached Wright after hearing him sit in with Coltrane. When Wright stated that he was not associated with a record label, Stollman declared "Well, you are now.") In 1966, while in Cleveland, he recorded with Albert Ayler's group, which at the time included Donald Ayler, Michael Samson, Muntawef Shaheed, and Ronald Shannon Jackson. The tracks remained unreleased until 2004, when they appeared on Holy Ghost: Rare & Unissued Recordings (1962–70). Wright's second album, Your Prayer, was recorded in 1967 and was also released by ESP-Disk. In 1968, Wright briefly joined Cecil Taylor's group, which also included Eddie Gale, Jimmy Lyons, Alan Silva, and Andrew Cyrille, for a tour of the west coast of the United States, where the group had a residency at Stanford University, performed at the Berkeley Jazz Festival, and opened for The Yardbirds at the Fillmore West.

In 1969, Wright moved to Europe and settled in Paris, where he formed and recorded with the Frank Wright Quartet, featuring Noah Howard, Bobby Few, and Muhammad Ali. In the early 1970s, Howard left and was replaced by Alan Silva, at which time the group changed its name to The Center of the World Quartet at Silva's suggestion. The group also established a label called Center of the World Records as well as a distribution company called Sun Records. In 1971, Wright briefly moved back to the United States, but then returned to France, where he continued to record and tour with a variety of musicians. In 1984, he joined Cecil Taylor's Orchestra of Two Continents, touring Europe and recording Winged Serpent (Sliding Quadrants). He also recorded Olu Iwa with Taylor in 1986. During this time he also performed and recorded with German visual artist and drummer A. R. Penck. In 1988, he joined the Art Ensemble of Chicago for a concert at the Petrillo Bandshell in Chicago.

Wright was an ordained minister, and was known as "Reverend" Frank Wright, "a title of veneration universally bestowed upon the saxophonist by his peers in recognition of his spiritual approach to music, as well as his fervent style of improvisation."

Wright died of a heart attack in Cologne, Germany, in 1990.

== Style and influence ==
Chris Kelsey wrote that "Ayler's scalding abstract expressionism was the prime influence on Wright, who transformed it with his own personality and passed it on." Kelsey also noted that "Echoes of Wright's playing can be heard in the work of such younger saxophonists as Glenn Spearman, Sabir Mateen, Charles Gayle, and Thomas Borgmann." Writing in The New York Times, reviewer Robert Palmer wrote that Wright's music "was sometimes referred to as 'energy music' during the 1960s, and although the term is vague... it is appropriate in Mr. Wright's case. The saxophonist sometimes seems to get so caught up in the physicality of his playing that he breaks into little dance steps in the middle of a solo." Palmer continued: "Mr. Wright has remained faithful to the rowdy, celebratory essence of what might be called the Cleveland style... the combination of maturity and power in his playing comes as something of a shock." Peter Brötzmann recalled that Wright "was a wild man, in a good sense: made music and lived life in his own way. He was one of the first black Americans we got to know really well, and we all learned a lot from that."

== Discography ==
=== As leader ===
- Frank Wright Trio (ESP-Disk, 1966) with Henry Grimes (bass) and Tom Price (drums)
- Your Prayer (ESP-Disk, 1967) with Arthur Jones (alto sax), Jacques Coursil (trumpet), Steve Tintweiss (bass), and Muhammad Ali (drums)
- Uhuru na Umoja (America, 1970) with Noah Howard (alto sax), Bobby Few (piano), and Arthur Taylor (drums)
- One for John (BYG, 1970) with Noah Howard (alto sax), Bobby Few (piano), and Muhammad Ali (drums)
- Church Number Nine (Odeon, 1971) with Noah Howard (alto sax), Bobby Few (piano), and Muhammad Ali (drums)
- Center of the World (Center of the World, 1972) with Bobby Few (piano), Alan Silva (bass), and Muhammad Ali (drums)
- Last Polka in Nancy? (Center of the World, 1973) with Bobby Few (piano), Alan Silva (bass), and Muhammad Ali (drums)
- Adieu Little Man (Center of the World, 1974) with Muhammad Ali (percussion)
- Solos Duets (Center of the World, 1975) with Bobby Few (piano, voice) and Alan Silva (bass, violin, piano, voice)
- Shouting the Blues (Sun, 1977) with Georges Arvanitas (piano), Jacky Samson (bass), and Charles Saudrais (drums)
- Kevin, My Dear Son (Sun, 1979) with Kamal Abdul Alim (trumpet), Eddie Jefferson (voice), Georges Arvanitas (piano), Reggie Workman (bass), Philly Joe Jones (drums), and Khalil Abdullah (percussion)
- Stove Man, Love Is the Word (Sandra Music, 1979) with Ka Kamal Abdul Alm (trumpet), Tony Smith (piano), Richard Williams (bass), Gerry Griffin (drums), and Khalil Abdullah (percussion)
- Eddie's Back in Town (Krona, 1982) with Tony Smith (piano), Richard Williams (bass), and Gregory Bufford (drums)
- The Complete ESP-Disk Recordings (ESP-Disk, 2005)
- Unity (ESP-Disk, 2006) with Bobby Few (piano), Alan Silva (bass), and Muhammad Ali (drums)
- Blues for Albert Ayler (ESP-Disk, 2012) with James Blood Ulmer (guitar), Benny Wilson (bass), and Rashied Ali (drums)

=== As sideman ===
- Albert Ayler, Holy Ghost: Rare & Unissued Recordings (1962–70) (Revenant, 2004)
- Albert Ayler, La Cave Live, Cleveland 1966 Revisited (ezz-thetics, 2022)
- Peter Brotzmann, Alarm (FMP, 1983)
- Hans Dulfer, El Saxofon (Catfish, 1971)
- Noah Howard, Space Dimension (America, 1971)
- Hannibal Lokumbe, The Light (Baystate, 1978)
- Raphe Malik, Last Set: Live at the 1369 Jazz Club (Boxholder, 2004)
- Louis Moholo, Spiritual Knowledge and Grace (Ogun, 2011)
- A.R. Penck, Through the Black Hole & Berlin Berlin (Music Corp., 1984)
- Saheb Sarbib, Aisha (Cadence, 1981)
- Cecil Taylor, Winged Serpent (Sliding Quadrants) (Soul Note, 1985)
- Cecil Taylor, Olu Iwa (Soul Note, 1994)
