= The Complete ESP-Disk' Recordings =

Compilation album by Frank Wright
- Released: 2005
- Recorded: November 11, 1965; March 26, 1967
- Genre: Free jazz
- Length: 1:40:02
- Label: ESP-Disk; ESP 4007

Frank Wright chronology
Eddie's Back in Town (1982)	The Complete ESP-Disk' Recordings (2005)	Unity (2006)

The Complete ESP-Disk' Recordings is a two-CD compilation album by saxophonist Frank Wright. Issued by ESP-Disk in 2005, it contains two studio albums released by the label during the 1960s: Frank Wright Trio, recorded in 1965 and issued in 1966, featuring bassist Henry Grimes and drummer Tom Price, and Your Prayer, recorded and released in 1967, featuring saxophone Arthur Jones, trumpeter Jacques Coursil, bassist Steve Tintweiss, and drummer Muhammad Ali. The compilation also features a twelve-part interview with Wright, conducted by ESP-Disk founder Bernard Stollman.

== Reception ==
Professional ratings
Review scores
Source	Rating
AllMusic	4.5/5 stars
The Penguin Guide to Jazz	3/4 stars

In a review for AllMusic, Michael G. Nastos wrote: "An important landmark in the making of new music for this time period, and one that launched Wright on a long journey into progressive jazz up to his death in 1990, this is where it started for him and many others. It's a CD that has to be considered essential in the lexicon of creative improvised African-American music."

The authors of The Penguin Guide to Jazz Recordings stated that the album "at least restores some of the small but neglected Wright canon... It isn't a revelatory reissue, of the kind that can reposition a reputation, but it's a solid body of work that gives some substance to Wright's musicianly reputation."

Writing for All About Jazz, Germein Linares commented: "Forty years after their inception, the material... remains remarkably fresh... While Wright was never fully appreciated while he was alive, this release hopes to, at the very least, give a new generation of jazz aficionados a chance to hear his music." AAJ's Clifford Allen noted the "pronounced bar-walking influence" audible in Wright's playing, and remarked "Though these ESP sessions are only an early indicator, Frank Wright was one to get it 'on.'"

== Track listing ==
=== Disc 1 ===
All compositions by Frank Wright.

Frank Wright Trio

1. "The Earth" – 7:52
2. "Jerry" – 12:10
3. "The Moon" – 14:56

Interview

4. "Bernard Stollman Meets Frank Wright" – 1:03
5. "Recording" – 0:47
6. "The Voice of Life" – 1:03
7. "Playing with Other Musicians" – 1:45
8. "Bernard Advises Frank on Europe" – 0:53
9. "Europe vs. America (Part One)" – 3:05
10. "Europe vs. America (Part Two)" – 1:56
11. "Other Recordings, Books, and More" – 2:52
12. "All Is Said" – 0:28

=== Disc 2 ===
Track 1 by Arthur Jones. Tracks 2–5 by Frank Wright.

Your Prayer

1. "The Lady" – 7:12
2. "Train Stop" – 7:44
3. "No End" – 7:10
4. "Fire of Spirits" – 12:56
5. "Your Prayer" – 16:10

== Personnel ==
- Frank Wright – tenor saxophone
- Henry Grimes – bass (disc 1)
- Tom Price – drums (disc 1)
- Arthur Jones – alto saxophone (disc 2)
- Jacques Coursil – trumpet (disc 2)
- Steve Tintweiss – bass (disc 2)
- Muhammad Ali – drums (disc 2)
