= At Judson Hall =

Live album by Noah Howard
- Released: 1968
- Recorded: October 19, 1966
- Venue: Judson Hall, New York City
- Genre: Free jazz
- Length: 37:20
- Label: ESP-Disk; 1064

Noah Howard chronology
Noah Howard Quartet (1966)	At Judson Hall (1968)	Space Dimension (1971)

At Judson Hall is a live album by alto saxophonist Noah Howard. It was recorded at Judson Hall in New York City on October 19, 1966, and was released in 1968 by ESP-Disk. On the album, Howard is joined by trumpeter Ric Colbeck, cellist Catherine Norris, pianist Dave Burrell, bassist Norris Jones, and percussionist Robert Kapp.

== Reception ==
Professional ratings
Review scores
Source	Rating
AllMusic	4/5 stars
The Penguin Guide to Jazz	3.5/4 stars
The Encyclopedia of Popular Music	3/5 stars

The authors of The Penguin Guide to Jazz Recordings called the album "one of the iconic recordings of the period," and stated that Howard "plays with fire and attitude" on the tribute to John Coltrane.

The Guardian's John Fordham noted that the album "was explicitly connected to the Coltrane/Coleman lineage, but also exhibited the mixture of Ayler's anguished soulfulness and an unexpectedly tender folksiness that would be Howard's signature sound."

== Track listing ==
All compositions by Noah Howard.

1. "This Place Called Earth" – 18:19
2. "Homage to Coltrane" – 19:01

== Personnel ==
- Noah Howard – alto saxophone, bells
- Ric Colbeck – trumpet
- Catherine Norris – cello
- Dave Burrell – piano
- Norris Jones – bass
- Robert Kapp – percussion
