= Music Is the Healing Force of the Universe =

Studio album by Albert Ayler
- Released: April 1970
- Recorded: August 26–29, 1969
- Genre: Jazz
- Label: Impulse!
- Producer: Ken Druker

Albert Ayler chronology
New Grass (1968)	Music Is the Healing Force of the Universe (1970)	The Last Album (1971)

Professional ratings
Review scores
Source	Rating
Allmusic	3/5 stars
DownBeat	1.5/5 stars
The Penguin Guide to Jazz Recordings	3/4 stars
The Rolling Stone Jazz Record Guide	2/5 stars

Music Is the Healing Force of the Universe by Albert Ayler was released in April 1970. The lyrics on the album were written by Ayler's partner, Mary Maria Parks. Apart from the posthumous album The Last Album, which contains outtakes from the same sessions, this was to be Ayler's last studio album recorded and released before his death in November 1970.

== Reception ==
The album was reviewed by Larry Kart for Down Beat in the October 15 issue of 1970. The reviewer was far from happy, and opened with the statement that "[t]his album is an almost unlistenable disaster and in itself doesn't call for much comment. Miss Maria chants tautological slogans and in comparison to Spiritual Unity, Bells, and Ghosts Ayler's playing is so crudely simplified that one can hardly believes this to be the same man". Kart awarded the album 1,5 star, according to Down Beat's own scale, somewhere between 'poor' and 'fair'.

In a review for AllMusic, Al Campbell called the album "a powerful and often ignored recording... a prophetic statement dealing with guilt, confusion, sorrow, and hopes of redemption..." and wrote: "Ayler's musical curtain was eerily closing the same way it started -- playing the blues of his high school summer vacations as a member of Little Walter's band. Music Is the Healing Force of the Universe, along with tracks that were released posthumously on the Last Album, were recorded at the same session. While not easy listening, they complete an important portrait of a man facing a life and death inner struggle beyond the boundaries of jazz." A review for Jazzwise states: "Along with the equally outstanding and misunderstood New Grass album, Ayler here is taking jazz into a new dimension. Complete with a bagpipes solo, an intensely spiritual recitation from his wife Mary Maria and former Mothers Of Invention/Canned Heat guitarist Henry Vestine playing electric free blues, many jazz critics at the time found this, now groundbreaking album, too difficult to decipher."

The authors of The Penguin Guide to Jazz awarded the album 3 stars, and commented: "Like New Grass, this is not quite the unreconstructed R&B album that some readers and listeners may have been led to expect. It... includes some wonderful playing from Albert and some of his most innovative use of sound... Music... is not the best Albert Ayler album, but it is not a laughable monstrosity either... This final studio statement touches on all the major themes of Ayler's life: sorrow, loss, guilt and, above all, redemption."

Writing for All About Jazz, Jeff Levine stated: "Music Is the Healing Force of the Universe may not be one of his best moments... or even his oddest..., but it's still essential and rewarding listening for those with a hankering for the fire music. As soon as Albert Ayler's first earth-shattering deep tenor roar opens the album, shivers are running up and down my spine. Nobody else has made a sound from a horn quite like that - a truly holy bleat." While Levine praised Bobby Few's piano work and Muhammad Ali's drumming, he was less approving of Mary Maria Parks' vocals, stating that they "clog up the album", and he called the final track, "Drudgery", "a completely baffling, long, lame blues-rock jam thing, that doesn't fit with the rest of the album", commenting "I'm shaking my head, wondering what the hell were they thinking. It's so wrong it's actually somewhat interesting... To hear this free-jazz icon stuck over this track is simply and utterly bizarre."

== Track listing ==
1. "Music Is the Healing Force of the Universe" – 8:41
2. "Masonic Inborn, Pt. 1" – 12:11
3. "A Man Is Like a Tree" – 4:35
4. "Oh! Love of Life" – 3:50
5. "Island Harvest" – 5:04
6. "Drudgery" (James Folwell, Parks, Henry Vestine) – 8:08

All music and lyrics written by Mary Maria Parks, except where noted.

== Personnel ==
- Albert Ayler – tenor saxophone, bagpipes, vocal
- Mary Maria Parks – vocal
- Henry Vestine – guitar
- Bobby Few – piano
- Stafford James – double bass
- Bill Folwell – electric Fender bass
- Muhammad Ali – drums
