= Alan Shorter =

- Also known as: Al Shorter
- Born: May 29, 1932; Newark, New Jersey, United States
- Died: April 5, 1988 (aged 55) Los Angeles, California, United States
- Genres: avant-garde jazz, free jazz
- Occupations: musician, composer
- Instruments: trumpet, flugelhorn
- Years active: 1960s–1970s
- Labels: Verve, America

Alan Shorter (May 29, 1932 – April 5, 1988) was an American free jazz trumpet and flugelhorn player, and the older brother of composer and saxophone player Wayne Shorter.

== Biography ==
Shorter was born in the Ironbound District in Newark, New Jersey. He started on alto saxophone, but switched to trumpet after graduating from high school. He attended Howard University but soon rebelled against the ultra-conservative atmosphere and dropped out. He later graduated from New York University.

He played his first professional gigs with a local bebop big band called the Jackie Bland Band (other members included his brother Wayne, trombonist Grachan Moncur III, and pianist Walter Davis, Jr.).In his early years, he focused on bebop before shifting to free jazz, a style he maintained throughout his career apart from a six-month period in a U.S. Army Band.

Shorter recorded two albums as a leader: Orgasm (1968) and Tes Esat (1971). Both were out of print for many years until re-issued by Verve Records in 2004 and 2005, respectively. He also recorded five albums with saxophonist Archie Shepp (1964–1970), including the classic Four for Trane (1964), two albums with Marion Brown (1965–1966), one album with Alan Silva (1970), and made an appearance on one of his brother's albums (The All Seeing Eye [1965]). Several of these albums feature his unusual compositions, his most famous being "Mephistopheles".

In the mid-1960s, Shorter moved to Europe, leading his own avant-garde gigs in Geneva and Paris. His style of free jazz sometimes proved to be too far-out for European audiences (his brother remembered that Shorter's gigs in Europe would often end with him responding to the crowd's boos by yelling, "You're not ready for me yet!"), but he generally found European audiences more receptive than those in the U.S. Eventually, he returned to the United States, where he taught briefly at Bennington College but otherwise faded into obscurity. He died of a ruptured aorta in Los Angeles, California in 1988, at age 55, shortly after becoming engaged to Ruth Ann Hancock, a cousin of Herbie Hancock.

Shorter's playing is comparable to that of Don Cherry, but with a more aggressive, anarchic bent. His own albums feature his groups functioning as a unit, rather than focusing on his own singular virtuosity. Reportedly, Shorter's musical style was akin to his personality: deep and intellectual, thought sometimes intentionally strange (his childhood nickname was "Doc Strange").

== Discography ==
=== As leader ===
- 1968: Orgasm (Verve Records) - with Charlie Haden, Gato Barbieri, Reggie Johnson, Muhammad Ali, Rashied Ali
- 1971: Tes Esat (America Records) - with Gary Windo, Johnny Dyani, Rene Augustus

=== As sideman ===
With Marion Brown

- Marion Brown Quartet (1965)
- Juba-Lee (1966)

With The New York Art Quartet

- Call It Art (Triple Point, 2013)

With Archie Shepp

- Four for Trane (1964)
- Archie Shepp and the Full Moon Ensemble (1970)
- Pitchin Can (1970)
- Doodlin' (1970)
- Coral Rock (1973)

With Wayne Shorter

- The All Seeing Eye (1965)

With Alan Silva

- Seasons (1971)

With François Tusques

- Intercommunal Music (1971)

== Written Material ==
- ‘allan [sic] shorter et le monstre magnétique’ [‘Alan Shorter and The Magnetic Monster’], Jazz Hot, June 1967: 24-5. [‘Interviewed with tape recorder by Daniel Berger and Alain Corneau, 18th May 1966, New York’.] [French language]
- Alan Shorter, [Liner Notes] Orgasm. c.1968.
- Alan Shorter, ‘Distension.’ Actuel, May 1969: 36–38. [French language]
- Val Wilmer, [Liner Notes] Tes Esat, 1970.
- Richard Williams, [Liner Notes] Parabolic. c.1969.
- Interview by Richard Williams. Melody Maker, May 1, 1971: 18.
- Elisabeth Chandet, ‘Jazz En Direct: Les Nuits du Vézelay’, Jazz Magazine, April 1971: 10-11. [French language]
- Philippe Carles, ‘Jazz En Direct: Alan Shorter Tes Esat’, Jazz Magazine, January 1973: 8-9. [French language]
- Ron Welburn, ‘Alan Shorter’. [Rev. of Parabolic and Tes Esat] Black World, October 1973: 48, 67.
- Alan Shorter, ‘Vivre la New Musique’, Jazz Magazine, February 1974: 11. [French language]
- J.R. Taylor, ‘Album Briefs’ [Rev. of Parabolic], Jazz Digest, Vol. 3, no. 1 (January 1974): 19
- Alan Shorter, [Letter], Cadence, Vol. 2, no. 1 (November 1976): 8
- Philippe Carles, [Liner notes], Tes Esat CD re-issue, 2004.
- Amiri Baraka, ‘Reissuing Orgasm’ [December, 1997], ‘Wayne Shorter on his brother, Alan (from interview with Amiri Baraka)’. Orgasm CD re-issue, 1998. Both texts reprinted in Baraka, Digging: The Afro-American Soul of American Classical Music (Berkeley, CA: University of California Press, 2009). CD booklet also contains ‘A Word from Rashied Ali’.
- Philippe Robert, ‘Schizophonia’. [French language] In Philippe Robert and Guillaume Belhomme, Free Fight: This Is Our (New) Thing (Rosières-en-Haye, France: Camion Blanc, 2012)
- ‘vorgarten’, ‘for me it’s NEW music! – alan shorter (1932-1987)’. [German language]. Online, Rolling Stone Forum, 2012: http://forum.rollingstone.de/foren/topic/alan-shorter/
- David Grundy, 'Why?' The Parabolic New Music of Alan Shorter'. Point of Departure, Issue 71, June 2020.
