= Uhuru na Umoja =

Studio album by Frank Wright
- Released: 1970
- Recorded: 1970
- Studio: Paris
- Genre: Jazz
- Length: 33:52
- Label: America
- Producer: Pierre Berjot

Frank Wright chronology
Your Prayer (1967)	Uhuru na Umoja (1970)	One for John (1970)

reissue cover

Uhuru na Umoja (in Swahili "Freedom and Unity") is an album by American free jazz saxophonist Frank Wright recorded in 1970 in Paris, originally released on the French America label and reissued on CD in 2004 by Universal France. Wright leads a quartet featuring alto saxophonist Noah Howard, who composed each of the tracks, pianist Bobby Few and bebop drummer Art Taylor in his first free jazz date. "Oriental Mood" and "Aurora Borealis" are the same compositions as "Mount Fuji" and "Queen Anne", from Howard's The Black Ark album.

== Reception ==
Professional ratings
Review scores
Source	Rating
AllMusic	4/5 stars
The Penguin Guide to Jazz Recordings	2.5/4 stars

In his review for AllMusic, Sean Westergaard states "Wright's gruff tenor contrasts nicely with Howard's sweeter tone, which is not really less intense, just less ferocious.. Fans of '60s-style 'energy music' should really check this out."

The Village Voice's Francis Davis wrote that Wright "blows with such conviction and spirit you find yourself being carried right along with him. It's free jazz at its most rapturous and hell-bent."

Clifford Allen of Paris Transatlantic called the album an excellent snapshot of "a regularly working free jazz group at the peak of its form," and commented: "the pieces on Uhuru Na Umoja are generally short and fall far from the side- or album-length compositions that one usually finds on a typical free jazz blowing session from this period... one assumes that Wright performances weren't always endless blowouts, but rather explorations of colors and shapes, not to mention lengths."

Writing for The Live Music Report, David Fujino called Noah Howard's compositions "simple incantatory tunes... that function as excellent spurs to creative group improvisation where melody and new melody combine and recombine into a progressively renewing albeit unfamiliar unity."

== Track listing ==
All compositions by Noah Howard.

1. "Oriental Mood" – 8:55
2. "Aurora Borealis" – 7:43
3. "Grooving" – 6:52
4. "Being" – 6:28
5. "Pluto" – 3:54

== Personnel ==
- Noah Howard – alto saxophone
- Frank Wright – tenor saxophone
- Bobby Few - piano
- Arthur Taylor – drums
