= Tes Esat =

Studio album by Alan Shorter
- Released: 1971
- Recorded: March 11, 1970
- Studio: Decca Studios, Paris, France
- Genre: Jazz
- Length: 40:44
- Label: America; 30 AM 6118
- Producer: Pierre Berjot

Alan Shorter chronology
Orgasm (1968)	Tes Esat (1971)

Tes Esat is an album by jazz trumpeter Alan Shorter, recorded in Paris in 1970 and released on the French America label.

== Reception ==
Professional ratings
Review scores
Source	Rating
AllMusic	4/5 stars
The Penguin Guide to Jazz Recordings	4/4 stars

AllMusic rated the album 4 stars with its review by Brandon Burke stating, "On this, the last of his leader dates, Shorter's compositions employ relatively vague stutter-step heads and then quickly dive right into free improvisation without looking back".

Writing for JazzTimes, Peter Margasak called the recording "a scalding album" featuring "fire-breathing saxophone work" by Gary Windo.

Clifford Allen of Paris Transatlantic described Tes Esat as "a sketchier and more mysterious follow-up" to Shorter's debut album, and commented: "It's difficult to say whether Shorter's music is 'likeable', as it's so difficult to make sense of. Is this sloppy and poorly intoned, also-ran improvising and unimaginative composition or the perfect springboard based on what would otherwise be shortcomings? I still haven't decided, but Shorter is definitely one of the most unique figures of his generation."

== Track listing ==
All compositions by Alan Shorter

1. "Disposition Part One" - 20:30
2. "Disposition Part Two" - 6:00
3. "Beast of Bash" - 3:10
4. "One Million Squared" - 8:10

== Personnel ==
- Alan Shorter - trumpet
- Gary Windo - tenor saxophone
- Johnny Mbizo Dyani - bass, flute, piano, bells
- Rene Augustus - drums, bells
