= One for John =

Studio album by Frank Wright
- Released: 1970
- Recorded: December 5, 1969
- Studio: Studio Saravah, Paris
- Genre: Free jazz
- Length: 42:35
- Label: BYG Records; 529 336
- Producer: Jean Georgakarakos, Jean-Luc Young

Frank Wright chronology
Uhuru na Umoja (1970)	One for John (1970)	Church Number Nine (1971)

One for John is an album by saxophonist Frank Wright. Dedicated to Wright's mentor, John Coltrane, it was recorded at Studio Saravah in Paris on December 5, 1969, and was released in 1970 by BYG Records as part of their Actuel series. On the album, Wright is joined by saxophonist Noah Howard, pianist Bobby Few, and drummer Muhammad Ali.

== Reception ==
Professional ratings
Review scores
Source	Rating
AllMusic	4/5 stars

The editors of AllMusic awarded the album 4 stars.

In a review for Jazzwise, Daniel Spicer wrote: "Some albums are so much of their time that they serve as historical documents just as much as musical recordings. Following John Coltrane's death in 1967, the promise of his journey into spiritually charged free jazz was enthusiastically taken up by the so-called 'second wave' of free jazz musicians... One For John is the quintessential session."

Bradford Bailey of The Hum stated: "Made with a stellar ensemble... it's hard to imagine these sessions could have ever failed or become anything other than what they are – absolutely stunning... it's one of the definitive effort within the collaborations which unfolded within France at the end of the 60s and the outset of the 70s. Liberation in every sense of the word."

Writing for Burning Ambulance, Phil Freeman noted that the album was recorded while Wright was at his peak, and that, along with his appearances on Uhuru na Umoja and Howard's Space Dimension, it is "his best work."

== Track listing ==
1. "One for John" (Frank Wright) – 16:45
2. "China - Part 1" (Bobby Few) – 5:00
3. "China - Part 2" (Bobby Few) – 20:50

== Personnel ==
- Frank Wright – tenor saxophone
- Noah Howard – alto saxophone
- Bobby Few – piano
- Muhammad Ali – drums
