= Sun Records (other companies) =

Sun Records has been the name of multiple 20th century record labels, most famously Sun Records, a Memphis-based music label.

Jazz saxophonist Frank Wright also started Sun Records (jazz) while living in Paris, France.

== History ==
The first "Sun Records" in Europe were single-sided disc records put out by The Crystalate Gramophone Record Manufacturing Company Ltd. of Tonbridge, Kent, England, from about 1905 to 1910. (The same company would later produce records under the name Imperial Records).

A nearly contemporaneous label was produced in the United States by the Leeds & Catlin company, about 1905–1907. The third "Sun Records" was produced by the Sun Record Company of Toronto, Ontario, Canada in the early 1920s. Many or all of the masters pressed were leased from the US-based Okeh Records. There were as many as eight other record companies that preceded and/or were contemporary with the Memphis label Sun Records run by Sam Phillips, the most famous of the companies by that name.

The other Sun Records that preceded the Memphis company by nearly forty years in one case, and six years in the other, or even those that were contemporary with it were never as significant to the history of 20th century music as Sam Phillips' little record company that operated out of his Memphis Recording Service. Since Sam had invested in the Holiday Inn Hotel chain earlier, he also recorded artist starting in 1963 on the label Holiday Inn Records for Kemmons Wilson.

Two Sun Records were offered on eBay.com in August and September 2006 and were pressed in Germany, probably around 1905–1912, for the Sun Record Company of Bombay, India, and referred to on the label as the Sun Disc Record to differentiate the discs from cylinder records also produced by the company. This Sun Record Company might have been the first to use that name. By 1919 another Sun Record Company came to life in Canada, but it, too, soon disappeared. The Canadian Sun Records were produced by the Sun Record Company of Toronto, Ontario, Canada (a unit of Compo Company Ltd.) in the 1920s. Many or all of the masters pressed were leased from the U.S. based Okeh Records.Compo Company Limited - History - The Virtual Gramophone

Another Sun Record, founded in New York City in 1946, was intended as an outlet for Jewish musicians and singers, including the famous Yiddish singer, Herman Yablokoff, whose immensely popular Papirossen [Sun 1050] was the top selling record for the label. Billing itself as “The Brightest Thing on Records,” it was already fading into oblivion when the Memphis Recording Service issued its first Sun record in February 1952. But it did contribute one thing, albeit unintentionally, to the Sun Record Company of Memphis, that being the design of the label itself that was copied directly from the New York City-based Sun Record Company. Another label, an Arabic language Sun Record Company came into being at about the same time, but little is known about its history.

=== Legal battle ===
A legal battle was fought over the name “Sun” between the Memphis Recording Service of Memphis, which was issuing records on the Sun label, and the Sun Recording Company of Albuquerque, New Mexico, also issuing records on the Sun label. Louise Massey, the “Sweetheart of the West” who co-wrote My Adobe Hacienda and whose brother wrote the theme song for television’s Petticoat Junction, among others, was its top artist. The lawsuit was settled in favor of the Memphis-based label, but no one noticed that the name and similar label had been in existence in New York for more than six years. The New York-based Sun Recording Corporation was virtually extinct by then, so even if anyone had noticed, no legal action was taken. The Memphis-based Sun Record Company went on to become the label that brought rock and roll music to the world, enjoying early success with Sun 181, Bear Cat (The Answer to Hound Dog) by Rufus Thomas – which also led to Sam Phillips’ second major lawsuit and the record was re-issued with the phrase (The Answer to Hound Dog) deleted. Sun Records in Memphis was sold in 1969 and still operates as Sun Records under the parent company Sun Entertainment Corporation. But the use of the name Sun Record Company did not end there. One other Sun existed during a slightly later era: the Sun Record Company based in Manila. This company did not attempt to disguise its copying of the Memphis Sun labels and re-issued records released by other American labels, such as Imperial 5528, Poor Little Fool written by Eddie Cochran’s fiancée, Sharon Sheeley, which became a massive hit for Ricky Nelson in 1958.

Even though Sam Phillips has died, the sun has not yet set on Sun Records. Numerous licenses have been issued to Germany’s Bear Family Records, England’s Charly Records, and other companies to issue and re-issue the Memphis Sun Records, some with the familiar brown on yellow label. Other companies are re-issuing Louise Massey’s recordings from the Albuquerque-based Sun Record Company.

== See also ==
- Sun Records for the Memphis-based label
- Sun Records (jazz) for the label by saxophonist Frank Wright.
- List of record labels
