= Black Gipsy =

1970 album by jazz saxophonist Archie Shepp

Studio album by Archie Shepp
- Released: 1970
- Recorded: November 9, 1969
- Studio: Decca Studios, Paris
- Genre: Jazz
- Label: America
- Producer: Pierre Berjot

Archie Shepp chronology
Blasé (1969)	Black Gipsy (1970)	Pitchin Can (1969)

Professional ratings
Review scores
Source	Rating
Allmusic	3.5/5 stars
The Rolling Stone Jazz Record Guide	3/5 stars

Black Gipsy is an album by jazz saxophonist Archie Shepp recorded in Europe in 1969 for the America label. The album was also issued by the Prestige label under the title Black Gypsy.

== Reception ==
The Allmusic review by Sean Westergaard states: "This music gets intense, but melody is always at its core: this is not just a free blowing session. The rhythm section keeps things well grounded, aided greatly by Burrell's marvelous comping while the horns and harmonica take the melodies and run with them. Good stuff."

== Track listing ==
1. "Black Gipsy" (Augustus Arnold, Lincoln T. Beauchamp Jr.) - 25:44
2. "Epitaph of a Small Winner: Rio de Janeiro/Casablanca/Chicago" (Lincoln T. Beauchamp, jr., known as Chicago Beau, Julio Finn - 22:40
3. "Pitchin' Can" (Cal Massey) - 7:35 Bonus track on CD
  - Recorded in Paris, France, November 9, 1969

== Personnel ==
- Archie Shepp - soprano saxophone
- Clifford Thornton - trumpet
- Noah Howard - alto saxophone
- Julio Finn - harmonica
- Leroy Jenkins - viola
- Dave Burrell - piano
- Earl Freeman - bass
- Sunny Murray - drums
- Chicago Beau - vocals
