= Unity (Frank Wright album) =

Live album by Frank Wright
- Released: 2006
- Recorded: June 1, 1974
- Venue: Moers Festival, Moers, Germany
- Genre: Free jazz
- Length: 56:28
- Label: ESP-Disk; ESP 4028

Frank Wright chronology
The Complete ESP-Disk Recordings (2005)	Unity (2006)	Blues for Albert Ayler (2012)

Unity is a live album by saxophonist Frank Wright. It was recorded at the Moers Festival in Moers, Germany on June 1, 1974, and was released in 2006 by ESP-Disk. On the album, Wright is joined by pianist Bobby Few, bassist Alan Silva, and drummer Muhammad Ali.

== Reception ==
Professional ratings
Review scores
Source	Rating
AllMusic	4/5 stars
The Penguin Guide to Jazz	3/4 stars
Tom Hull – on the Web	A−

In a review for AllMusic, Scott Yanow wrote: "The two selections are continuous, never run out of intensity, and feature some intense playing, particularly from Wright and Ali. Free jazz collectors will definitely want this powerful performance."

The authors of The Penguin Guide to Jazz Recordings stated that "the music comes across strongly," and noted that "the real star of 'Unity: Part One' is Silva, whose arco solo is a model of form and concentration."

Writing for Jazz Times, Scott Verrastro commented: "The ensemble communicates with the effortless interaction of four men who have been playing together for years, with each instrument naturally weaving in and out of the mix. The solos even reflect this unbound energy... Though the unadventurous and faint-of-heart would surely disagree, there is much beauty to discover here, as is usually the case with such demon-exorcising music."

Derek Taylor of Paris Transatlantic remarked: "True believers are likely to have already heard these sounds on crackle-dusted xth generation tape dubs. But for a completely new audience of free jazz listeners this disc delivers the goods, and at a reasonable asking price to boot."

The Big Takeover's Steve Holtje called the album a "gem," and stated: "They create quite a ruckus; this remained 'in the can' for over three decades not because of any lack of quality, but because of the label's struggles. It's fully up to the high standards of most of Wright's work."

== Track listing ==
1. "Unity Part I" – 27:28
2. "Unity Part II" – 29:00

== Personnel ==
- Frank Wright – tenor saxophone
- Bobby Few – piano
- Alan Silva – bass
- Muhammad Ali – drums
