= Doodlin' (album) =

Studio album by Archie Shepp
- Released: 1976
- Recorded: November 1970
- Genre: Jazz
- Length: 38:47
- Label: Inner City

Archie Shepp chronology
Coral Rock (1970)	Doodlin' (1976)	Things Have Got to Change (1971)

Professional ratings
Review scores
Source	Rating
Allmusic	3.5/5 stars

Doodlin' is an album by jazz saxophonist Archie Shepp recorded in Paris, France, in November 1970 and released on the Inner City label in 1976. The album features performances by Shepp with Alan Shorter, Bob Reid and Muhammad Ali.

== Reception ==
The Allmusic review by Ron Wynn calls the album an "Interesting, albeit flawed late '70s (sic) work with Shepp trying his hand at piano as well as his usual sax. Sometimes he makes good statements, but other times, his lack of sufficient experience can be heard. Still, it's not among his worst releases, but not his best either".

== Track listing ==
1. "Sweet Georgia Brown" (Ben Bernie, Kenneth Casey, Maceo Pinkard) - 1:53
2. "Doodlin'" (Horace Silver) - 3:53
3. "Doodlin'" [take 2] (Silver) - 6:15 CD bonus track not on original LP
4. "Invitation" (Bronislaw Kaper, Paul Francis Webster) - 8:36
5. "Worried About You" (Archie Shepp) - 4:00
6. "If You Could See Me Now" (Tadd Dameron) - 5:10
7. "More Than You Know" (Edward Eliscu, Billy Rose, Vincent Youmans) - 4:41
8. "Coral Rock" (Alan Shorter) - 4:28
- Recorded in Paris, France, November, 1970

== Personnel ==
- Archie Shepp – piano
- Alan Shorter – flugelhorn
- Bob Reid – bass
- Muhammad Ali – drums
