= The Black Ark (album) =

Studio album by Noah Howard
- Released: 1972
- Recorded: 1969
- Studio: Bell Sound (New York City)
- Genre: Free jazz
- Length: 40:34
- Label: Freedom FLP 40105
- Producer: Alan Bates and Noah Howard

Noah Howard chronology
Space Dimension (1971)	The Black Ark (1972)	Live at the Village Vanguard (1972)

The Black Ark is an album by American free jazz saxophonist Noah Howard recorded in New York City in 1969 for the Freedom label and was rereleased in 2007.

== Reception ==
Professional ratings
Review scores
Source	Rating
AllMusic	4/5 stars
Penguin Guide to Jazz	4/4 stars
All About Jazz	4.5/5 stars

The AllMusic review by Brandon Burke awarded the album 4 stars stating "While The Black Ark is not altogether different than his other records from this period, it presents Howard in a new setting with a number of interesting avant-garde players... Easily recommended for fans of the 1969 BYG/ESP free jazz scene".

The Penguin Guide to Jazz nominated the album as part of its "Core Collection" of recommended jazz recordings.

All About Jazz stated "By 1969, Howard was terrifyingly good: as a player, composer and bandleader. The four originals which make up The Black Ark—a mutant blues, a free jive samba, a cod-Japanese "ying-tong" melody and a wonderfully lyrical ballad—are catchy and hummable, at a time when most free jazz rejected tunes and structures".

== Track listing ==
All compositions by Noah Howard

1. "Domiabra" - 10:31
2. "Ole Negro" - 8:49
3. "Mount Fuji" - 15:31
4. "Queen Anne" - 5:43

== Personnel ==
- Noah Howard - alto saxophone
- Arthur Doyle - tenor saxophone
- Earl Cross - trumpet
- Leslie Waldron - piano
- Norris Jones - bass
- Muhammad Ali - drums
- Juma Sultan - congas
