= Pitchin Can =

Studio album by Archie Shepp
- Released: 1970
- Recorded: November 9, 1969 & July 23, 1970; Paris, France
- Genre: Jazz
- Label: America
- Producer: Pierre Berjot

Archie Shepp chronology
Black Gipsy (1969)	Pitchin Can (1970)	Archie Shepp & Philly Joe Jones (1970)

Professional ratings
Review scores
Source	Rating
Allmusic	3.5/5 stars

Pitchin Can is an album by jazz saxophonist Archie Shepp recorded in Paris, France, in 1969 and 1970 for the America label. The album features one track by Shepp with Clifford Thornton, Noah Howard, Julio Finn, Leroy Jenkins, Dave Burrell, Earl Freeman, Sunny Murray and Chicago Beau ("Pitchin' Can" which was added to the CD release of Black Gipsy) and one extended track by Shepp with Thornton, Lester Bowie, Alan Shorter, Bobby Few, Bob Reid, Muhammad Ali, Djibrill and Ostaine Blue Warner.

== Track listing ==
1. "Uhuru (Dawn of Freedom) Part 1" - 18:18
2. "Uhuru (Dawn of Freedom) Part 2" - 10:43
3. "Pitchin' Can" (Cal Massey) - 7:35

- Recorded in Paris, France, November 9, 1969 (track 3) and July 23, 1970 (tracks 1 & 2)

== Personnel ==
- Archie Shepp - tenor saxophone, piano, soprano saxophone
- Clifford Thornton - trumpet, valve trombone
- Lester Bowie - trumpet (tracks 1 & 2)
- Alan Shorter - flugelhorn (tracks 1 & 2)
- Bobby Few - piano (tracks 1 & 2)
- Bob Reid - bass (tracks 1 & 2)
- Muhammad Ali - drums (tracks 1 & 2)
- Djibrill - congas (tracks 1 & 2)
- Ostaine Blue Warner - percussion (tracks 1 & 2)
- Noah Howard - alto saxophone (track 3)
- Julio Finn - harmonica (track 3)
- Leroy Jenkins - viola (track 3)
- Dave Burrell - piano (track 3)
- Earl Freeman - bass (track 3)
- Sunny Murray - drums (track 3)
- Chicago Beau - vocals (track 3)
