= Church Number Nine =

Studio album by Frank Wright Quartet
- Released: 1971
- Recorded: March 7, 1970
- Studio: Paris
- Genre: Free jazz
- Length: 45:32
- Label: Odeon Records; OP-88019
- Producer: Pierre Berjot

Frank Wright chronology
One for John (1970)	Church Number Nine (1971)	Center of the World (1972)

Church Number Nine is an album by saxophonist Frank Wright. It was recorded in Paris on March 7, 1970, and was released in 1971 by Odeon Records in Japan. On the album, Wright is joined by saxophonist Noah Howard, pianist Bobby Few, and drummer Muhammad Ali. The French label Calumet reissued the album in 1973.

== Reception ==
Professional ratings
Review scores
Source	Rating
AllMusic	4/5 stars

In a review for AllMusic, Dan Warburton called "Part 1" an "explosion of holy-rolling free gospel," and praised Few's playing as "particularly volcanic." Regarding "Part 2," Warburton stated that, while Howard's solo begins in a "florid" manner, "the rhythm section's relentless attack and Wright's preaching vocals and percussion eventually blast him into the upper atmosphere."

Phil Freeman of Burning Ambulance described the recording as having "two album-side-long tracks during which saxophonists Wright and Noah Howard attempt to out-shout both each other and pianist Bobby Few," and commented: "If gospel music sounded like this, I'd go to church."

A reviewer for the Listen Records newsletter remarked: "This record is heavy, ecstatic, and mind-blowing! Church Number Nine is without a single doubt one of the greatest free-blowing jazz discs ever to be put down on wax."

A writer for Paris Transatlantic suggested that the use of supplemental percussion instruments on the album "is a habit Wright evidently picked up from his brief stint with Coltrane," and stated that on "Part 2," Wright's solo consists "of tight bursts of energy, mauling and ripping notes to pieces like a famished lion before finally settling on one and doing it to death."

== Track listing ==
1. "Church Number Nine Part 1" – 26:01
2. "Church Number Nine Part 2" – 19:32

== Personnel ==
- Frank Wright – tenor saxophone
- Noah Howard – alto saxophone
- Bobby Few – piano
- Muhammad Ali – drums
