= Greg Tate =

American writer, musician, and producer (1957–2021)

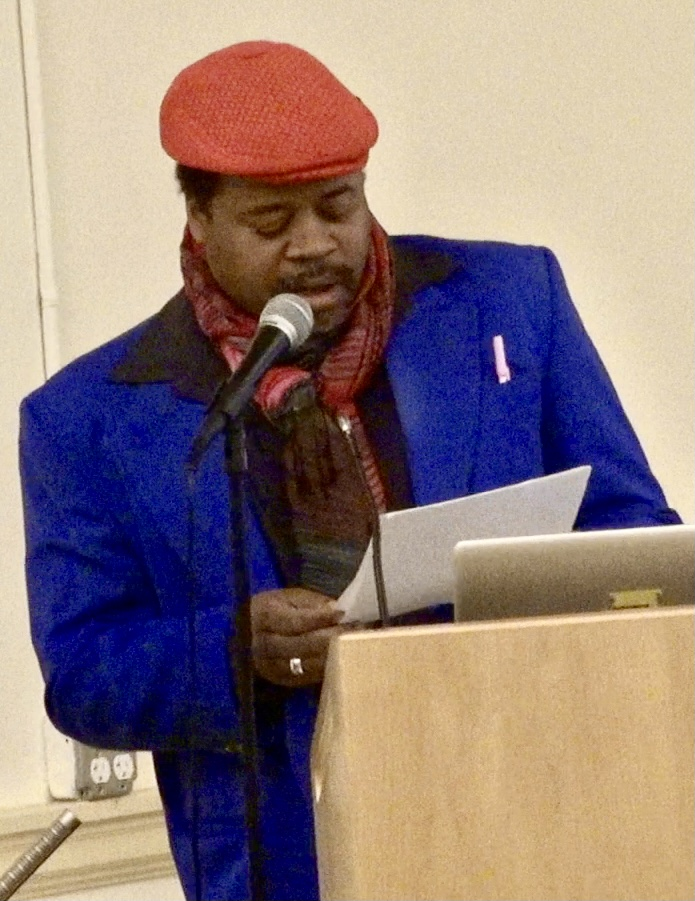
- Tate reading at New York University in 2013
- Born: Gregory Stephen Tate; October 14, 1957; Dayton, Ohio, U.S.
- Died: December 7, 2021 (aged 64); New York City, U.S.
- Education: Howard University
- Occupations: Cultural critic, journalist, author, musician
- Years active: 1981–2021
- Employer: The Village Voice
- Notable work: Flyboy in the Buttermilk: Essays on Contemporary America
- Children: 1

Gregory Stephen Tate (October 14, 1957 – December 7, 2021) was an American writer, musician, and producer. A long-time critic for The Village Voice, Tate focused particularly on African-American music and culture, helping to establish hip-hop as a genre worthy of music criticism. Flyboy in the Buttermilk: Essays on Contemporary America (1992) collected 40 of his works for the Voice and he published a sequel, Flyboy 2, in 2016. A musician himself, he was a founding member of the Black Rock Coalition and the leader of Burnt Sugar.

In 2024, Tate was posthumously awarded a Pulitzer Prize Special Citation.

== Early life and education ==
Gregory Stephen Tate was born on October 14, 1957, in Dayton, Ohio. When he was 13 years old, his family moved to Washington, D.C. His parents Charles and Florence (Grinner) Tate were civil rights movement activists involved in the Congress of Racial Equality, and played Malcolm X's speeches and Nina Simone's music around the house.

Tate credited Amiri Baraka's Black Music and Rolling Stone, which he first read when he was 14, with stimulating his interest in collecting and writing about music. As a teenager, Tate taught himself how to play guitar. He attended Howard University, where he studied journalism and film.

== Career ==
=== Early career and music ===
In 1981, following an introduction by family friend Thulani Davis, The Village Voice critic Robert Christgau asked Tate to contribute to the Voice. The following year Tate moved to New York City, where he developed friendships with other musicians, including James "Blood" Ulmer and Vernon Reid. In 1985, he co-founded the Black Rock Coalition (BRC) with some of the African-American musicians he knew who had a common interest in playing rock music, writing in a manifesto that the group "opposes those racist and reactionary forces within the American music industry which undermine and purloin our musical legacy and deny Black artists the expressive freedom and economic rewards that our Caucasian counterparts enjoy as a matter of course."

In 1999, Tate established Burnt Sugar, an improvisational ensemble that varies in size from approximately 12 to 40 musicians and blended a range of genres including funk, free jazz, and psychedelic rock. Tate, who played guitar and conducted the group, described it in 2004 as "a band I wanted to hear but could not find."

=== Writing ===
Though initially a freelancer, Tate quickly became the leading critic on Black culture for the Voice and in that position, one of the leading cultural critics in New York City. He became a staff writer for The Village Voice in 1987, a position he held until 2003. He developed a reputation for "slangy erudition;" Hua Hsu writes: "His best paragraphs throbbed like a party and chattered like a salon; they were stylishly jam-packed with names and reference points that shouldn't have got along but did."

Tate's 1986 essay "Cult-Nats Meet Freaky Deke" for the Voice Literary Supplement is widely regarded as a milestone in Black cultural criticism; in the essay, he juxtaposes the "somewhat stultified stereotype of the black intellectual as one who operates from a narrow-minded, essentialized notion of black culture" with the "many vibrant colors and dynamics of African American life and art," trying to find a middle ground in order to break down "that bastion of white supremacist thinking, the Western art world." His work was also published in The New York Times, The Washington Post, Artforum, DownBeat, Essence, JazzTimes, Rolling Stone, and VIBE. At Vibe he became a columnist in 1992, titling his series "Black-Owned". The Source described Tate as one of "the Godfathers of hip hop journalism." A key contribution was his conceptualization of hip-hop as existing on a continuum with jazz, claiming for the former the level of cultural respect and inquiry the latter commanded.

In 1992, Tate published Flyboy in the Buttermilk: Essays on Contemporary America, a collection of 40 essays on culture and politics, drawn from his writing for the Village Voice. Writing for Pitchfork, Allison Hussey said: "It became a definitive work for Tate," treating subjects like Miles Davis, Public Enemy, and Jean Michel Basquiat. Jelani Cobb called the collection "a clinic on literary brilliance" with significant influence on other writers. This impact on subsequent generations of critics was one of Tate's major contributions, with Jon Caramanica writing that "he affected every writer I cared about and learned from — we're all Tate's children."

Tate had the admiration of many of the musicians he wrote about, like David Bowie and Flea; Flea cried in appreciation when Tate reviewed the Peppers' 1999 album Californication.

In 2003, Tate published Everything But the Burden: What White People Are Taking From Black Culture, an edited collection of 18 Black writers addressing the topic of white appropriation of Black art. The same year, he published Midnight Lightning: Jimi Hendrix And The Black Experience, an appraisal of Hendrix as a Black icon.

In 2016, Tate published Flyboy 2. In The New Yorker, Hua Hsu wrote that this follow-up to his first collection brought "into sharper focus" Tate's interest in what Tate described as “the way Black people ‘think,’ mentally, emotionally, physically,” and “how those ways of thinking and being inform [their] artistic choices."

=== Later career ===
He was the Louis Armstrong Visiting Professor at Columbia University's Center for Jazz Studies in 2009 and a visiting professor of Africana studies at Brown University in 2012. In 2010, he was awarded a United States Artists fellowship.

== Personal life ==
Tate had a daughter, Chinara Tate, born circa 1979. In New York, he was a longtime resident of Harlem.

Tate died of cardiac arrest on December 7, 2021, in New York City, at the age of 64. That night, the Apollo Theater in Harlem displayed his name on the marquee in remembrance of him as a cultural icon.

== Works ==
- Flyboy in the Buttermilk: Essays on Contemporary America. New York: Simon & Schuster. 1992. ISBN 0-671-72965-9. Foreword by Henry Louis Gates Jr.
- Editor. Everything But the Burden: What White People Are Taking From Black Culture. New York: Broadway Books. 2003. ISBN 0-7679-0808-2.
- Midnight Lightning: Jimi Hendrix and the Black Experience. Chicago: Lawrence Hill Books. 2003. ISBN 1-55652-469-2.
- Flyboy 2: The Greg Tate Reader. Durham, N.C.: Duke University Press. 2016. ISBN 978-0-8223-6180-0.
- Co-editor with Liz Munsell. Writing the Future: Basquiat and the Hip-hop Generation. Boston: Museum of Fine Arts. 2020. ISBN 978-0-8784-6871-3.
