= LaMont Johnson =

- Born: October 1, 1941; New York City, NY, US
- Died: October 21, 1999 (aged 58) Austin, Texas, US
- Genres: Jazz, soul, funk
- Occupations: Pianist; Record label owner Film producer
- Instrument: Piano
- Years active: 1962–1999

LaMont Johnson (October 1, 1941 – October 21, 1999) was an American jazz pianist who played in the hard bop and post-bop genres. He recorded extensively with Jackie McLean during the 1960s as well as with Ornette Coleman, Kenny Burrell, Bud Shank, Paul Beaver, and Bernie Krause, among others.

== Biography ==
James LaMont Johnson was born in New York City, New York. During his childhood he took dancing, singing, and mime lessons, and appeared on the Star Time Kids television program at age 7. He later served in the United States Air Force in Germany, after which he attended Manhattan College and Syracuse University.

Johnson began his recording career in 1962. In New York City, he worked with tubist Howard Johnson and trumpeter Woody Shaw as the bebop period came to an end. Throughout the 1960s, he recorded with artists such as Jackie McLean, Ornette Coleman, and George Benson. Later in the same decade, Johnson began composing music for films and advertisements.

Johnson lived and worked in San Diego, California, where he established the record label MasterScores Records. Johnson worked in the film industry during the 1970s as a distributor and producer. He produced the 1973 martial arts film Thunderfist. Johnson was a major shareholder in the film distributors Artisan Releasing and Twin World Films, and formed another distributorship, Elmark General Film.

In his later years, Johnson lived in Austin, Texas, where he continued to perform at venues such as Top of the Marc, and released I'll Be Home for Kwanzaa on the Bagel Label. During this time, he appeared on Jackie's Blues Bag by the Hip Bop Essence All Stars, a group that also included Branford Marsalis, Javon Jackson, and Vincent Herring. He also worked with Black Entertainment Television. Between 1991 and 1997, he was involved with more than 30 jazz festivals, as either a performer or producer.

On October 21, 1999, Johnson died of heart failure in Austin, Texas, where he lived with his wife, Jayne Taylor Johnson. Johnson had two daughters, Astrid and Kyleigh, and two sons, Neil and Rand. At the time of his death, Johnson had indicated his plans to return to San Diego.

== Discography ==
=== As leader ===
- 1972: Sun, Moon and Stars (Mainstream Records)
- 1976: Nine: A Mystical Musical Allegory (Orchard)
- 1979: Aces (Orchard)
- 1987: New York Exile (Orchard)
- 1991: Burned by the Passion (MasterScores)
- 1997: Jackie's Blues Bag (Hip Bop Essence)
- 1998: 242 E 3rd (Orchard)
- 2000: Collaboration (with Kenny Burrell)

=== As sideman ===
with Jackie McLean

- New and Old Gospel (Blue Note, 1967)
- 'Bout Soul (Blue Note, 1967)
- Demon's Dance (Blue Note, 1967)
- Hipnosis (Blue Note, 1978)

with Hank Mobley

- Reach Out! (Blue Note, 1968)
