= America Records (France) =

French jazz record label

America Records was a French jazz record label.

== Discography ==
#	Artist	Album	Other issues	Year
6050	Inez and Charlie Foxx			
6051	Miles Davis	Blue Moods	Debut DEB 120	1955
6052	Charles Mingus	Chazz!	Debut DEB 123	1955
6053	Charlie Parker	Jazz at Massey Hall	Debut DEB 124	1953
6054	Thad Jones	The Fabulous Thad Jones	Debut DEB 127	1954,55
6055	J.J. Johnson, Kai Winding, Willie Dennis, Benny Green	Four TrombonesVol. 1	Debut DEB 130	1953
6056	Bud Powell	Bud Powell-Charlie Mingus-Max Roach	Fantasy 6006	1953
6057	Max Roach Quartet	Speak, Brother, Speak!	Fantasy 6007	1962
6058	J.J. Johnson, Kai Winding, Willie Dennis, Benny Green	Four TrombonesVol. 2	Debut DEB 126	1953
6059	Charles Mingus	The Charles Mingus Quintet & Max Roach	Debut DEB 139	1955
6060	Oscar Pettiford	My Little Cello	Debut DEB 132	1953,59
6061	Charlie Parker	Bird on 52nd St.	Fantasy 6011	1948
6062	Charlie Parker	Bird at St. Nick's	Fantasy 6012	1950
6063	Charles Mingus	Right Now: Live at the Jazz Workshop	Fantasy 6017	1964
6064	Jimmy Witherspoon	At the Renaissance with Gerry Mulligan & Ben Webster Quintet	HiFi J 426	1959
6065	Fats Navarro / Roy Eldridge	Saturday Night Swing Session	Counterpoint CPT 549	1947
6066	Odetta	Folk Songs By The Greatest		
6067	Earl Hines	Plays Fats Waller	Fantasy 3217	1955-56
6068	Dave Brubeck	The Genius of Dave Brubeck	Fantasy 3229	1951-55
6069	Stan Getz	With Cal Tjader	Fantasy 3266	1958
6070	Gerry Mulligan / Paul Desmond	Mulligan Desmond	Fantasy 3220	1952-54
6071	Sonny Terry & Brownie McGhee	At Sugar Hill	Fantasy 3340	
6072	Milt Jackson & Sonny Stitt	In the Beginning	Galaxy 204	c.1947-48
6073	Dave Brubeck	Jazz at Storyville [sic]	Fantasy 3245	1953
6074	John Lee Hooker	The King of Folk Blues	Galaxy 201	
6075	Sonny Terry & Brownie McGhee	Blues And Shouts	Fantasy 3317	
6076	Memphis Slim	Great Memphis Slim (Lord Have Mercy On Me)		1968
6077	John Lee Hooker	The Great John Lee Hooker	Crown CLP 5353	
6078	John Lee Hooker	The Blues	Crown CLP 5157	
6079	B.B. King	Greatest Hits		
6080	Lightnin' Hopkins	Really The Blues		
6081	Cal Tjader	Jazz at Monterey	Fantasy 3295	1959,61
6082	Charles Mingus	Charles Mingus Presents Charles Mingus	Candid CJM 8005	1960
6083	Dave Brubeck	Recorded live at Newport Jazz Festival [sic]	Fantasy 3249	1953
6084	Earl Hines	Solo	Fantasy 3238	1956
6085	The Caravans	The Soul of Gospel Music		
6086	Alex Bradford	The King of Gospel Music		
6087	Lee Morgan	The Genius Of Lee Morgan		1960
6088	Jimmy Reed	Wailin' the Blues		1956-59
6089	Odetta	At the Gate of Horn	Tradition TLP 1025	
6090	Mongo Santamaria	Mongo's Greatest Hits	Fantasy 3373	
6091	Dave Brubeck	At the Blackhawk		1953,55
6092	The Montgomery Brothers	Wes' Best	Fantasy 3376	1960-61
6093	Merl Saunders	Soul Groovin'		1965
6094	John Lee Hooker	Live at Sugar Hill	Galaxy 205	
6095	Dave Brubeck	Brubeck-Tjader	Fantasy 3205	1950
6096	Charlie Parker	The Immortal	Le Jazz Cool JC 102	1948,49,50
6097	Pee Wee Russell	The Definitive Pee Wee Russell	Counterpoint CPT 562	1958
6098	Art Ensemble Of Chicago	Certain Blacks		1970
6099	Archie Shepp & Chicago Beau	Black Gipsy		1969
6100	Albert Ayler	Free Jazz	Fantasy 6016	1963
6101	John Lee Hooker	I Wanna Dance All Night		1969
6102	Archie Shepp & Philly Joe Jones	Archie Shepp & Philly Joe Jones		1969
6103	Archie Shepp	Coral Rock		1970
6104	Frank Wright Quartet	Uhuru Na Umoja		1970
6105	Charles Mingus	Town Hall Concert	Jazz Workshop JWS 009	1965
6106	Archie Shepp	Pitchin Can		1969,70
6107	Earl Hines	In Paris		1970
6108	Noah Howard	Space Dimension		1970
6109	Charles Mingus	Pithycanthropus Erectus		1970
6110	Charles Mingus	Blue Bird		1970
6111	Jacques Coursil	Black Suite	BYG-Actuel	1969
6112	Arthur Jones	Scorpio		1969
6113	Clifford Thornton	The Panther and the Lash		1970
6114	Roswell Rudd	Roswell Rudd		1965
6115	Dave Burrell	After Love		1970
6116	Art Ensemble Of Chicago	Phase One		1971
6117	Art Ensemble Of Chicago	Art Ensemble of Chicago with Fontella Bass		1970
6118	Alan Shorter	Tes Esat		
6119	Fontella Bass	I Need To Be Loved		c.1970
6120	Paul Bley	The Fabulous Paul Bley Quintet	Inner City IC 1007	1958
6121	Paul Bley	Improvisie		1971
6122	Anthony Braxton	Donna Lee		1972
6123	Robin Kenyatta	Free State Band		1972
6124	Mal Waldron	Mal Waldron with the Steve Lacy Quintet		1972-73
6125	Steve Lacy	The Gap		1972
6126	Willie Mabon	The Comeback		1973
6127	Eddy Louiss	Orgue Vol. 1		1972
6128	Mal Waldron	The Whirling Dervish		1972-73
6129	Oscar Peterson / Stéphane Grappelli	Vol. 1		1973
6130	Memphis Slim	So Long		
6131	Oscar Peterson / Stéphane Grappelli	Vol. 2		1973
6132	Eddy Louiss	Orgue Vol 2		1972
6133	Dizzy Gillespie	The Giant		1973
6134	Emergency	Homage to Peace		1973
6135	Dizzy Gillespie	The Source		1973
6136	Willie Mabon	Chicago 1963		
6137	Lafayette Afro Rock Band	Malik		
6138	If	Another Time Around		
6139	Stéphane Grappelli / Jean-Luc Ponty	Stéphane Grappelli / Jean-Luc Ponty	Improvising Artists IAI 37.38.52	1973
6140	Charles Mingus	Town Hall Concert 1964 Vol. 1	Jazz Workshop JWS 005	1964
6143	Lionel Hampton			1973
6144	Chick Corea	Quartet		1971
6145	Lonnie Smith	Lonnie Smith	Groove Merchant 3308	1979
6146	Carmen McRae			1973
6147	Jeremy Steig			1970
6148	Jimmy Ponder	Seven Minds		c.1978
6149	Buddy Rich			1973,75
6152	Harry Edison	Harry "Sweets" Edison		
6153	Marc Fosset	La Récré		
6155	Lucky Thompson	Lucky Thompson		1972
6156	Richard "Groove" Holmes	New York 1973		
6158	Carmen McRae		Time 52104	1962,63
6159	Various Artists	Yesterday (Getz-Mulligan-Gray)	Mainstream 56025	c.1948
001-002	Charles Mingus	Mingus at Monterey [2LP]	Jazz Workshop JWS 001/2	1964
003/4/5	Charles Mingus	The Great Concert of Charles Mingus [3LP]	Prestige PRST 34001	1964
006/007	Duke Ellington	Sacred Concert	Fantasy F 8407	1968
008/9/10	Charlie Parker	Anthology [3LP]		1945-47
011-012	Anthony Braxton	Saxophone Improvisations Series F [2LP]		1972
013-014	Lightnin' Hopkins	The Great Electric Show and Dance		
015-016	Claude Bolling	Jazz Gala '79		1979
