= New and Old Gospel =

Studio album by Jackie McLean
- Released: January 1968
- Recorded: March 24, 1967
- Studio: Van Gelder Studio, Englewood Cliffs, NJ
- Genre: Avant-garde jazz, free jazz
- Length: 41:32
- Label: Blue Note; BST 84262
- Producer: Alfred Lion

Jackie McLean chronology
Tune Up (1966)	New and Old Gospel (1968)	'Bout Soul (1967)

New and Old Gospel is an album by American saxophonist Jackie McLean recorded in 1967 and released on the Blue Note label. It features McLean in a quintet with saxophonist Ornette Coleman (here on trumpet), pianist LaMont Johnson, bassist Scotty Holt and drummer Billy Higgins.

== Reception ==
The AllMusic review by Thom Jurek stated: "This is one legendary Blue Note date that isn't mentioned often enough in that label's great history".

Professional ratings
Review scores
Source	Rating
AllMusic	4/5 stars
The Penguin Guide to Jazz Recordings	3/4 stars

== Track listing ==
1. "Lifeline Medley: Offering/Midway/Vernzone/The Inevitable End" (McLean) - 21:40
2. "Old Gospel" (Ornette Coleman) - 10:42
3. "Strange as It Seems" (Coleman) - 9:10

== Personnel ==
- Jackie McLean - alto saxophone
- Ornette Coleman - trumpet
- LaMont Johnson - piano
- Scotty Holt - bass
- Billy Higgins - drums
