= Noah Howard =

American jazz musician

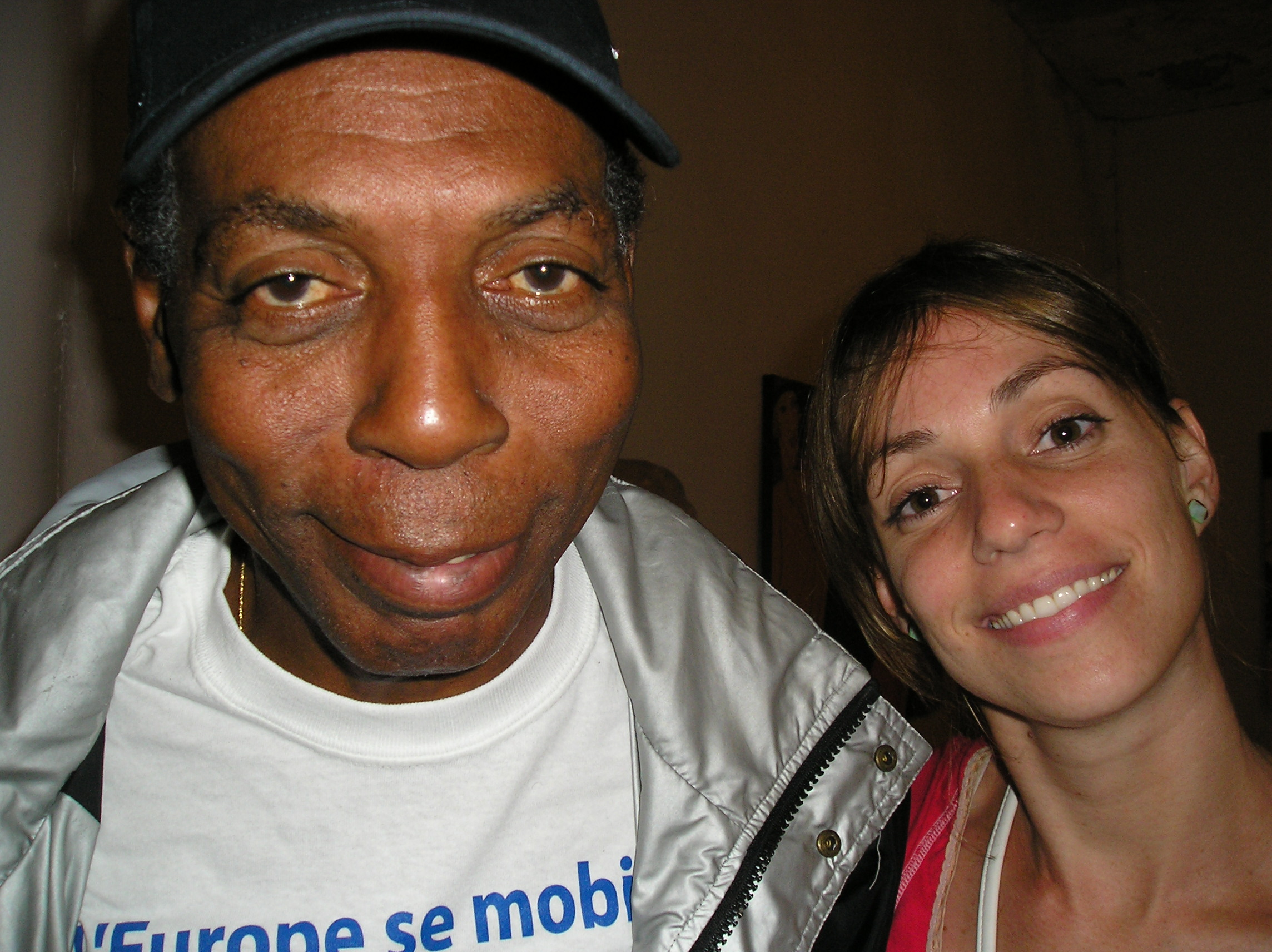
Noah Howard in 2008

Noah Howard (April 6, 1943 – September 3, 2010) was an American free jazz alto saxophonist.

== Biography ==
Born in New Orleans, Howard played music from childhood in his church. He first learned trumpet and later switched to alto, tenor and soprano saxophone. He was an innovator influenced by John Coltrane and Albert Ayler. He studied with Dewey Johnson, first in Los Angeles and later on in San Francisco. When he moved to New York City he started playing with Sun Ra.

He recorded his first LP as a leader, Noah Howard Quartet, in 1966, and his second LP At Judson Hall later that year, both for ESP Records, but found little critical acclaim in the US. In the 1960s and 1970s he performed regularly in the US and Europe, moving to Paris in 1968.

In 1969, he appeared on Frank Wright's album One for John and on Black Gipsy with Archie Shepp. As leader he recorded The Black Ark with Arthur Doyle among others. In 1971 he created his own record label, AltSax, and published most of his music under that label.

In 1971, he recorded Patterns in the Netherlands with Misha Mengelberg and Han Bennink. He moved to Paris in 1972, lived in Nairobi in 1982 and finally moved to Brussels in late 1982, where he had a studio and ran a jazz club. He recorded steadily through the 1970s and 1980s, exploring funk and world music in the latter decade and recording for AltSax. In the 1990s, he returned to his free-jazz origins, releasing on Cadence Jazz among other labels, and experienced a resurgence in critical acclaim. His last two albums, Desert Harmony (2008, with Omar al Faqir) and Voyage (2010), reflected his interest in World music and were influenced by Indian, Latin American and Middle Eastern music.

Noah Howard died on 3 September 2010 of a cerebral haemorrhage at the age of 67. He is survived by his wife, Lieve Fransen.

== Discography ==
=== As leader or co-leader ===
- Noah Howard Quartet (ESP-Disk, 1966)
- At Judson Hall (ESP-Disk, 1968)
- Space Dimension (America, 1971)
- The Black Ark (Freedom, 1972)
- Live at the Village Vanguard (Freedom / Intercord, 1972)
- Patterns (Altsax, 1973) (reissued as part of Patterns/Message to South Africa)
- Live at the Swing Club (Ricordi, 1974)
- Live in Europe, Volume 1 (Sun Records, 1975) (reissued as Ole)
- Red Star (Mercury, 1977) featuring Kenny Clarke
- Berlin Concert (FMP, 1977)
- Schizophrenic Blues (FMP, 1978)
- Traffic (Frame, 1983)
- Migration (Altsax, 1990)
- Live at Documenta IX (Megadisc, 1992)
- In Concert (Cadence, 1998)
- Patterns/Message to South Africa (Eremite, 1999)
- Between Two Eternities (Cadence, 2000) with Bobby Kapp
- Live at the Unity Temple (Ayler, 2000)
- Live in Paris (Altsax, 2001)
- Dreamtime... (Altsax, 2003)
- The Eye of the Improviser (Altsax, 2003) (compilation)
- Desert Harmony (Altsax, 2007) with Omar Faqir
- Transit Mission (Altsax, 2009) with Bobby Kapp
- Voyage (Altsax, 2010)
- Live at Glenn Miller Café (JaZt Tapes, 2012)
- From Dust We Came... To Dust We Return (Dirter/Static Caravan, 2016) with Justin Wiggan and Chris Mapp

=== As sideman ===
With Chris Chalfant

- Convergence (Chris Chalfant Music, 2007)

With Ted Daniel

- Tapestry (Sun, 1977)

With James Emanuel

- Middle Passage (Altsax, 2001)

With Zusaan Kali Fasteau

- Expatriate Kin (CIMP, 1997)
- Camaraderie (Flying Note, 1998)

With Eve Packer

- West Frm 42nd (Altsax, 1998)
- That Look (Boxholder, 2000)
- NY Woman (Altsax, 2001) (single)
- Window 9/11 (Altsax, 2002)
- Cruisin w/Moxie (Altsax, 2003)
- Now Playing (Altsax, 2009)
- First and Last (EPHereNowMusic, 2010) (single)

With Archie Shepp

- Black Gipsy (America, 1970)
- Pitchin Can (America, 1970)

With Frank Wright

- Uhuru na Umoja (America, 1970)
- One for John (BYG, 1970)
- Church Number Nine (Odeon, 1971)

== Books ==
- music in my soul (buddy's knife jazzedition, 2011)
