= Trio 3 (free jazz trio) =

- Origin: New York City
- Genres: Free jazz
- Years active: late 1980s – 2022
- Labels: Intakt; Dizim; Passin' Thru; Palmetto; Marge
- Past members: Oliver Lake; Reggie Workman; Andrew Cyrille

Trio 3 was a collaborative American jazz group whose members were saxophonist Oliver Lake, bassist Reggie Workman, and drummer Andrew Cyrille. The trio existed for roughly 35 years: the musicians first played together in the late 1980s, and the group disbanded in February 2022. During this time they recorded eleven albums, some of which featured guest pianists. The musicians described their sound as "futuristic music within the idiomatic continuum of jazz."

== History ==
The group had its origins in the late 1980s. According to Oliver Lake, the three musicians began hiring each other for their projects, leading to the formation of a trio. Lake recalled: "We did it so much, we decided it made sense for us to have one group. It was a business decision, but also a musical decision." Cyrille and Lake appeared on Workman's 1986 album Synthesis; Lake and Workman appeared on Cyrille's 1992 album My Friend Louis; and Cyrille and Workman appeared on Lake's 1993 album Edge-ing. They recorded their first album as a trio in 1992 with Live in Willisau.

Trio 3's musical outlook was derived in part from the notions of stylistic cross-fertilization that were common attributes of both the New York loft jazz scene of the 1970s and organizations such as Chicago's AACM and St. Louis's BAG. Workman summed up his attitude: "You'd say, 'I like this idea; I can learn a lot from it—what can I do with this personally?'" At the same time, despite the fact that each of the musicians had extensive experience as a group leader, the trio was, according to Cyrille, "truly leaderless in terms of one person playing and directing it."

Four pianists (Irène Schweizer, Geri Allen, Jason Moran, and Vijay Iyer) appeared as guests on Trio 3 albums. Workman described these encounters as "a nice junction," and commented that the general idea was to find "a chordal person whose concept isn't dogmatic, but can be loose enough to encompass what we're doing and maneuver within our space—and for us to do the same for that person."

The group's final performance took place in February 2022 at Dizzy's Jazz Club in New York City. Ken Micallef, writing for DownBeat, called the concert "an unfettered gift."

== Discography ==
Before "Trio 3"

- The Reggie Workman Ensemble - Synthesis with Marilyn Crispell (Leo, 1986)
- Andrew Cyrille Quintet - My Friend Louis with Hannibal & Adegoke Steve Colson (DIW, 1991)
- Oliver Lake Quartet - Edge-ing with Charles Eubanks (Black Saint, 1993)

As "Trio 3"

- Live in Willisau (Dizim, 1997)
- Encounter (Passin' Thru, 2000)
- Open Ideas (Palmetto, 2002)
- Time Being (Intakt, 2006)
- Wha's Nine: Live at the Sunset (Marge, 2008)
- Berne Concert with Irène Schweizer (Intakt, 2009)
- At This Time with Geri Allen (Intakt, 2009)
- Celebrating Mary Lou Williams–Live at Birdland New York with Geri Allen (Intakt, 2011)
- Refraction – Breakin' Glass with Jason Moran (Intakt, 2013)
- Wiring with Vijay Iyer (Intakt, 2014)
- Visiting Texture (Intakt, 2017)
