= At This Time (Trio 3 album) =

Studio album by Trio 3 + Geri Allen
- Released: 2009
- Recorded: August 29–30, 2008
- Studio: Peter Karl, Brooklyn
- Genre: Jazz
- Length: 60:51
- Label: Intakt

Trio 3 chronology
Berne Concert (2009)	At This Time (2009)	Celebrating Mary Lou Williams–Live at Birdland New York (2011)

At This Time is an album by Trio 3, a jazz group consisting of saxophonist Oliver Lake, bassist Reggie Workman and drummer Andrew Cyrille, with guest pianist Geri Allen. It was recorded in 2008 and released by Intakt Records.

== Background ==
Before this recording Geri Allen collaborated with each member of Trio 3. Since first moving to New York from Detroit, she performed as a member of Lake's ensembles throughout the '80s. Cyrille played on Allen's 1984 debut recording as leader The Printmakers. Workman featured Allen on his 1995 recording Cerebral Caverns.

== Reception ==
Professional ratings
Review scores
Source	Rating
Down Beat	4/5 stars
Tom Hull – on the Web	A−
All About Jazz	4/5 stars

The Down Beat review by Peter Margasak states "Allen has worked with all three members, so she fits right in on a typically sharp, probing program that dissolves lines between post-bop and free jazz."

The All About Jazz review by Chris May notes that "Allen's love of tunes and chord progressions, and her flowing rhapsodism, make her an imaginative choice of partner for Trio 3 and the meeting works marvelously."

== Track listing ==
1. "Swamini (for Alice Coltrane/Turiyasangitananda)" (Geri Allen) – 6:58
2. "Gazzeloni" (Eric Dolphy) – 6:12
3. "For Patrik" (Allen, Lake, Workman, Cyrille) – 5:20
4. "All Net" (Oliver Lake) – 3:41
5. "Current" (Reggie Workman) – 6:54
6. "Lake’s Jump" (Curtis Clark) – 8:25
7. "Long Melody" (Oliver Lake) – 6:26
8. "Tey" (Andrew Cyrille) – 5:58
9. "Barbara’s Rainbow" (Allen, Lake, Workman, Cyrille) – 4:17
10. "In the Realm … of the Child … of True Humanity Within (Gospel of Mary)" (Geri Allen) – 6:40

== Personnel ==
- Andrew Cyrille – drums
- Reggie Workman – bass
- Oliver Lake – alto saxophone, flute
- Geri Allen – piano
