= Ode to the Living Tree =

Studio album by Andrew Cyrille
- Released: 1995
- Recorded: December 18 and 19, 1994
- Studio: XIPPI Studio, Dakar, Senegal
- Genre: Jazz
- Label: Venus Records; TKCV-790982
- Producer: Tetsuo Hara

Andrew Cyrille chronology
X Man (1994)	Ode to the Living Tree (1995)	Good to Go, with a Tribute to Bu (1997)

Ode to the Living Tree is an album by drummer Andrew Cyrille. It was recorded in December 1994 at XIPPI Studio in Dakar, Senegal, and was released by Venus Records in 1995, as well as by Evidence Music in 1997. On the album, Cyrille is joined by saxophonists Oliver Lake and David Murray, pianist Adegoke Steve Colson, bassist Fred Hopkins, and percussionist Mor Thiam. According to Cyrille, it was the first jazz album recorded in Senegal.

== Reception ==
Professional ratings
Review scores
Source	Rating
AllMusic	4/5 stars
Tom Hull – on the Web	B−

In a review for AllMusic, Alex Henderson wrote: "the drummer leads an inspired, cohesive quintet... the performances are generally quite melodic; in fact, Ode is essentially an album of inside/outside post-bop... rather than ultra-radical, ultra-dissonant free jazz... Although not as radical as some of Cyrille's other work, Ode to the Living Tree is an excellent CD that he should be proud of."

Willard Jenkins, writing for Jazz Times, called Cyrille "a vital and very much underrated percussionist and bandleader" who "always brings a sense of the Motherland to his music, whether exploring free landscapes, or structured outings like most on this date... There is a feeling of Trane meets Sun Ra at the corner of Murray & Lake on this date as the spirits of those two grand masters are in the air."

== Track listing ==
1. "Coast to Coast" (Cyrille) – 5:45
2. "A Love Supreme - Acknowledgement and Resolution" (John Coltrane) – 19:43
3. "Mr. P. C." (John Coltrane) – 4:14
4. "Ode to the Living Tree" (Cyrille) – 8:52
5. "Dakar Darkness" (Murray) – 5:38
6. "So That Life Can Endure..., P.S. With Love" (Cyrille) – 9:49
7. "Midnight Samba" (Colson) – 9:53
8. "Water, Water, Water" (Cyrille) – 3:11

== Personnel ==
- Andrew Cyrille – drums, percussion
- Oliver Lake – alto xaxophone
- David Murray – tenor saxophone, bass clarinet
- Adegoke Steve Colson – electric piano
- Fred Hopkins – bass
- Mor Thiam – African drums (tracks 1 and 8)
