= Time Being =

Time Being, The Time Being, or For the Time Being may refer to:

- Time Being (Peter Erskine album), 1993
- Time Being (Ron Sexsmith album), 2006
- Time Being (Trio 3 album), 2006
- The Time Being, a 2012 American mystery film
- For the Time Being, a poem by W. H. Auden published in 1944
- For the Time Being (Annie Dillard), a 2009 nonfiction book
- For the Tyme Being, a 2008 mixtape by Shing02
