= Dolphy (disambiguation) =

Dolphy (1928–2012) was a Filipino comedian. It may also refer to:

- Dolphy Theatre, Studio 1 of ABS-CBN, named after the comedian
- Eric Dolphy (1928 – 1964), American jazz alto saxophonist, flutist, and bass clarinetist
- Tears for Dolphy, 1964 album by jazz trumpeter Ted Curson
- Dedicated to Dolphy, 1994 album by jazz saxophonist Oliver Lake
