= Wha's Nine: Live at the Sunset =

Live album by Trio 3
- Released: 2008
- Recorded: October 28, 2007
- Venue: The Sunset, Paris
- Genre: Free jazz
- Label: Merge; 40
- Producer: Gérard Terronès

Trio 3 chronology
Time Being (2006)	Wha's Nine: Live at the Sunset (2008)	Berne Concert (2009)

Wha's Nine: Live at the Sunset is a live album by Trio 3, a jazz group consisting of saxophonist Oliver Lake, bassist Reggie Workman and drummer Andrew Cyrille. It was recorded at The Sunset in Paris in October 2007, and was released in 2008 by Marge Records.

== Reception ==
Professional ratings
Review scores
Source	Rating
All About Jazz	4.5/5 stars

A reviewer for All About Jazz called the album "a gem of a document," and wrote: "Trio 3's collective development finds each member commonly orbiting the others' contributions with empathy solidified over two decades... Its upbeat theme incorporates all the elements that make Trio 3... one of the best small groups performing—and recording... today."

David Whiteis, writing for Jazz Times, commented: "this kind of music is 'a collective move towards emancipation'—rectifying contradictions, making it possible for individual freedom and group cohesiveness to thrive side-by-side instead of canceling each other out. Like the juxtaposition of the joy and vitriol that characterizes Lake's musical attack, like the spiritual uplift that the trio mines from even the harshest, most dark-hued material, this unity between group and individual spirit portends a way of seeing and hearing that manifests harmony from discord, hope from despair and order from chaos."

== Track listing ==
1. "Gazzelloni" (Eric Dolphy) – 6:18
2. "Amreen" (Curtis Clark) – 13:21
3. "ZC" (Cyrille) – 10:33
4. "Come on Home, Baby" (Leroy Jenkins) – 6:06
5. "Willow Song" (Workman) – 8:01
6. "Striation" (Cyrille) – 12:04
7. "Wha's Nine" (Workman) – 6:20
8. "Hasan" (Lake) – 7:56

== Personnel ==
- Oliver Lake – alto saxophone
- Reggie Workman – bass
- Andrew Cyrille – drums
