= Wiring (disambiguation) =

Wiring is the electrical installation of cabling.

It may also refer to:

- Wiring (software), a software development platform
- Wiring (album), the album by Trio 3 + Vijay Iyer
