= 1961 (disambiguation) =

1961 was a common year starting on Sunday of the Gregorian calendar.

1961 may also refer to:

- 1961 (Last Step album), an album by Aaron Funk under the moniker Last Step
- 1961 (Eric Dolphy album)
- "1961" (Heroes), an episode of the NBC TV series Heroes
- "1961", a 2012 song by the Fray from Scars & Stories
