= Virtual Reality (Total Escapism) =

Studio album by Oliver Lake
- Released: 1992
- Recorded: October 9, 1991
- Studio: Clinton Recording, New York City
- Genre: Jazz
- Length: 60:51
- Label: Gazell
- Producer: Sam Charters

Oliver Lake chronology
Boston Duets (1992)	Virtual Reality (Total Escapism) (1992)	Edge-ing (1994)

Virtual Reality (Total Escapism) is an album by American jazz saxophonist Oliver Lake, recorded in 1991 and released on the Gazell label.

== Reception ==
Professional ratings
Review scores
Source	Rating
AllMusic	4.5/5 stars
The Penguin Guide to Jazz	3.5/4 stars

In his review for AllMusic, Scott Yanow states, "Oliver Lake is heard throughout at the top of his game, making this both an easily recommended set for his fans and a perfect introduction to his dynamic music."

The Penguin Guide to Jazz says, "This was Lake's working quartet and perhaps the most pungent band he'd had for a decade... A fine album."

== Track listing ==
All compositions by Oliver Lake except where noted.

1. "Jesus Christ" (Curtis Clark) – 4:46
2. "Fables of Faubus" (Charles Mingus) – 8:29
3. "The Prophet" (Eric Dolphy) – 8:39
4. "Shedetude" (Bobby Bradford) – 5:20
5. "Pop a Wheelie" – 8:54
6. "Handful of Fives" (Roland Kirk) – 9:40
7. "Virtual Reality (Total Escapism)" – 7:03
8. "Jest a Little" – 8:00

== Personnel ==
- Oliver Lake – alto saxophone, soprano saxophone
- Anthony Peterson – guitar
- Santi Debriano – bass
- Pheeroan akLaff – drums
