= The Complete Copenhagen Concert =

Live album by John Coltrane
- Released: 2009
- Recorded: November 20, 1961
- Venue: Falkonercentret, Copenhagen, Denmark
- Genre: Jazz
- Label: Magnetic / Gambit

Alternate cover

The Complete Copenhagen Concert (also released as Complete 1961 Copenhagen Concert) is a live album by jazz musician John Coltrane. It was recorded on November 20, 1961, at the Falkonercentret in Copenhagen, Denmark during a European tour, and was released in 2009 by both Magnetic Records, a label based in Luxembourg, and Gambit Records, based in Spain. In 2013 it was reissued by 'In' Crowd Records. The album features Coltrane on tenor and soprano saxophone, Eric Dolphy on bass clarinet, alto saxophone, and flute, McCoy Tyner on piano, Reggie Workman on bass, and Elvin Jones on drums.

The music was reissued as part of the 2015 compilation So Many Things: The European Tour 1961. Additional recordings from the same tour appear on Live Trane: The European Tours.

== Reception ==
Professional ratings
Review scores
Source	Rating
All About Jazz	4/5 stars

In a review for All About Jazz, Warren Allen called the album "a must-have for Coltrane or Dolphy completists," and noted that, despite the poor sound quality, "the music itself is transcendently good." He commented: "this would have been an astonishing performance to witness... part of the pleasure of hearing this band is in the seemingly telepathic give and take between all players."

Matthew Fiander of PopMatters stated that "the band stutters and rolls through a smoldering version of 'Delilah', with all the speed, nuance, and wild-eyed power at full throttle in Coltrane’s solos," while "Everytime We Say Goodbye" is "an excellent and bittersweet juxtaposition to the unpredictability of 'Delilah', perhaps a moment for the audience to catch its collective breath."

== Track listing ==
1. "Announcement By Norman Granz" — 2:23 (not on the Magnetic release)
2. "Delilah" — 11:16
3. "Everytime We Say Goodbye" — 4:43
4. "Impressions" — 12:53
5. "Naima" — 6:46
6. "My Favorite Things [False Starts] Into Announcement By John Coltrane" 0:57 (not on the Magnetic release)
7. "My Favorite Things" — 27:19

== Personnel ==
- John Coltrane — tenor saxophone/soprano saxophone
- Eric Dolphy — bass clarinet/alto saxophone/flute
- McCoy Tyner — piano
- Reggie Workman — bass
- Elvin Jones — drums
