= Berne Concert =

Live album by Trio 3 + Irène Schweizer
- Released: 2009
- Recorded: November 23 and 24, 2007
- Venue: Berne and Zürich, Switzerland
- Genre: Free jazz
- Length: 1:00:43
- Label: Intakt Records; CD 150
- Producer: Patrik Landolt

Trio 3 chronology
Wha's Nine: Live at the Sunset (2008)	Berne Concert (2009)	At This Time (2009)

Berne Concert is a live album by Trio 3, a jazz group consisting of saxophonist Oliver Lake, bassist Reggie Workman and drummer Andrew Cyrille. It was recorded in Berne and Zürich, Switzerland in November 2007, and was released in 2009 by Intakt Records. On the album, the musicians are joined by pianist Irène Schweizer

== Reception ==
Professional ratings
Review scores
Source	Rating
All About Jazz	5/5 stars
Tom Hull – on the Web	B+

In a review for All About Jazz, John Sharpe wrote: "As Trio 3, Lake, Workman and Cyrille have worked with pianists in the past... so it is no surprise that they are readily able to absorb Schweizer into their collective embrace. What is more of a surprise is how naturally she fits in, sounding completely integrated into their soundworld... Trio 3 is sure to find new fans with Berne Concert: not a single track on this outstanding disc is less than stellar."

Stuart Broomer, writing for Point of Departure, commented: "The trio... embody free jazz as deeply traditional and insistently lyrical, and the shared focus gives their music a consistent precision. There aren't many musicians who could collaborate as seamlessly with the three as Schweizer, who belongs to the same traditions... The program is rigorously democratic. Each member of the trio provides a composition for the quartet, with interludes in which Schweizer joins each member in a duet. It's all crowned by an intense episode of free improvisation. There's a certain element of ritual in the performance, but it's driven by an intense lyricism, each composition a miracle of linear simplicity that develops extended improvisation."

== Track listing ==
1. "Flow" (Lake) – 8:51
2. "R. I. Exchange 1" (Schweizer/Workman) – 4:54
3. "Aubade" (Cyrille) – 12:05
4. "Phrases" (Schweizer/Lake) – 5:36
5. "Ballad Of The Silf" (Workman) – 9:04
6. "Timbral Interplay" (Schweizer/Cyrille) – 6:26
7. "WSLC" (Workman/Schweizer/Lake/Cyrille) – 13:48
- Track 2 recorded on November 24, 2007, at the Unerhört! Festival, Rote Fabrik, Zürich, Switzerland. Remaining tracks recorded on November 23, 2007, at Taktlos, Berne, Switzerland.

== Personnel ==
- Oliver Lake – alto saxophone
- Reggie Workman – bass
- Andrew Cyrille – drums
- Irène Schweizer – piano
