= Evocation (album) =

Live album by Andrew Cyrille, Elliott Sharp, and Richard Teitelbaum
- Released: 2022
- Recorded: October 13, 2011
- Venue: Roulette Intermedium, New York City
- Genre: Free improvisation
- Label: Infrequent Seams; IS-1047

Andrew Cyrille chronology
2 Blues for Cecil (2022)	Evocation (2022)	Music Delivery/Percussion (2023)

Evocation is a live album by percussionist Andrew Cyrille, multi-instrumentalist Elliott Sharp, and keyboardist and electronic musician Richard Teitelbaum. It was recorded on October 13, 2011, at Roulette Intermedium in New York City as part of Thomas Buckner's Interpretations Series, and was released in 2022 by the Infrequent Seams label.

In an interview, Cyrille noted: "We just went in to have a conversation... We were open to what would be brought up by any of the three of us and responding back and forth, like we were talking... The point is to have it be equilateral, to be able to hear each other and yourself in context of the whole."

The album is dedicated to the memory of Teitelbaum, who died in 2020.

== Reception ==
Professional ratings
Review scores
Source	Rating
The Vinyl District	A

In a review for The Big Takeover, Michael Toland wrote: "Given the reputation of these guys... you might expect chaotic noise, and while that's not inaccurate, anyone expecting a blizzard of sound may be disappointed... Evocation definitely isn't easy listening, but if you allow yourself to let go of any preconceived notion of the sounds these three man can make, it casts a spell that's uneasy to shake."

Bruce Lee Gallanter of the Downtown Music Gallery stated: "The entire set flows from one section to the next and sounds most organic in the way it unfolds... At times it is difficult to recognize who is doing which sound but it doesn't really matter if the sounds/music is thoughtfully created and manipulated. The overall effect is most mesmerizing, sparse at times yet still dreamlike."

The Vinyl District's Joseph Neff called the music "brilliant and unpredictable," and commented: "the performance heard here, a captivating example of pure improvisation..., benefits from the players' expertise and familiarity, and specifically a shared knowledge of tactics... Evocation is surely abstract, but it downplays aural mayhem, instead delivering an extended engagement with the textural, with tensions and mysteriousness proliferating over explosiveness and skronk. That's not to infer the performance is devoid of fireworks, as all five sections offer passages where the intensity rises and the trio spits out a few sparks."

== Track listing ==
1. "Opening" – 7:54
2. "Singularity to Unity" – 13:31
3. "Hudson North, Hudson South" – 9:03
4. "Transoceanic Travelers" – 5:22
5. "Evocation" – 9:17

== Personnel ==
- Andrew Cyrille – drums, percussion
- Elliott Sharp – 8-string guitarbass, bass clarinet, electronics
- Richard Teitelbaum – piano, computer, sampler
