= Edge-ing =

Studio album by Oliver Lake
- Released: 1993
- Recorded: June 28 & 29, 1993
- Genre: Jazz
- Length: 54:28
- Label: Black Saint
- Producer: Giovanni Bonandrini

Oliver Lake chronology
Virtual Reality (Total Escapism) (1991)	Edge-ing (1993)	Dedicated to Dolphy (1996)

Edge-ing is an album by American jazz saxophonist Oliver Lake, recorded in 1993 for the Italian Black Saint label.

== Reception ==
The AllMusic review awarded the album 4 stars.

Professional ratings
Review scores
Source	Rating
AllMusic	4/5 stars
The Penguin Guide to Jazz Recordings	3/4 stars

== Track listing ==
All compositions by Oliver Lake except as indicated

1. "Edge-ing" - 9:08
2. "Scene One" - 8:42
3. "Shiffs" - 11:18
4. "Peanut Butter" (John Hicks) - 10:27
5. "Zaki" - 5:46
6. "Verve Nerve" (Curtis Clark) - 9:07
  - Recorded at Mu Rec Studio in Milano, Italy, on June 28 & 29, 1993

== Personnel ==
- Oliver Lake - alto saxophone
- Charles Eubanks - piano
- Reggie Workman - bass
- Andrew Cyrille - drums
