= Synthesis (Reggie Workman album) =

Live album by Reggie Workman
- Released: 1986
- Recorded: June 15, 1986
- Venue: Painted Bride Art Center, Philadelphia
- Genre: Jazz
- Length: 1:07:35
- Label: Leo Records; LR 131
- Producer: Leo Feigin

Reggie Workman chronology
The Standard (1980)	Synthesis (1986)	Images (1989)

Synthesis is a live album by bassist/composer Reggie Workman. It was recorded on June 15, 1986, in Philadelphia and was released by Leo Records later that year. On the album, Workman is joined by multi-instrumentalist Oliver Lake, pianist Marilyn Crispell, and drummer Andrew Cyrille. Workman, Lake, and Cyrille would later go on to form the group known as Trio 3.

== Reception ==
Professional ratings
Review scores
Source	Rating
AllMusic	3/5 stars
The Penguin Guide to Jazz	3/4 stars

In an article for The New York Times, Robert Palmer wrote: "The group is an all-star unit... But they don't play like all-stars here; they play like a unit... the music is very free structurally, with a soaring spirit and incantatory qualities that link it to some of the better small-band sessions from the early days of the mid-60's ESP label. But while he leaves plenty of room for each player, Mr. Workman deploys his forces ingeniously... This is stunning music, with a deeply felt intensity and a purity of intent that haven't been finding their way onto jazz records as often as one would like."

The authors of the Penguin Guide to Jazz Recordings awarded the album 3 stars and praised Crispell's playing, stating that she gives "the performance its undoubted sense of coherence."

Writing for AllMusic, Thom Jurek remarked: "As a quartet, this band has some interesting things to say. There is a fire in the group interplay, and Lake's playing is very inspired... Workman gets considerable credit for putting this ensemble together."

== Track listing ==
All compositions by Reggie Workman unless otherwise noted.

1. "Jus' Ole Mae" - 8:00
2. "Ogun's Ardor" - 9:27
3. "Martyrs Hymn" - 6:19
4. "Earthly Garden" - 15:08
5. "Chant" (Marilyn Crispell) - 8:35
6. "Synapse II" - 9:07
7. "Fabula" - 6:49

== Personnel ==
- Reggie Workman – bass
- Oliver Lake – reeds
- Marilyn Crispell – piano
- Andrew Cyrille – drums

== Production ==
- Leo Feigin – producer
- Kazunori Sugiyama – recording engineer
