= Summit Conference (album) =

Studio album by Reggie Workman
- Released: 1994
- Recorded: December 5–6, 1993
- Studios: Kampo Audio, New York
- Genre: Jazz
- Length: 56:46
- Labels: Postcards Records; POST1003

Reggie Workman chronology
Altered Spaces (1993)	Summit Conference (1994)	Cerebral Caverns (1995)

Summit Conference is an album by bassist/composer Reggie Workman. It was recorded on December 5 & 6, 1993 in New York City, and was released by Postcards Records in 1994. On the album, Workman is joined by multi-instrumentalist Sam Rivers, trombonist Julian Priester, pianist Andrew Hill, and drummer Pheeroan akLaff.

Regarding the title of the album, Workman wrote: "we have recorded a unique CD which has the musical mark of my personal experience and direction but in no way stifles or compromises the wonderful musical resources assembled. It is a true summit conference."

== Reception ==
Professional ratings
Review scores
Source	Rating
AllMusic	4.5/5 stars
The Penguin Guide to Jazz	4/4 stars
DownBeat	4.5/5 stars

A reviewer for DownBeat magazine awarded the album 4.5 stars and stated: "the virtuoso veterans on Summit Conference create highly structured, tightly focused improvisations that sound ripe, rich, and fully mature--neither fresh nor stale..."

The authors of the Penguin Guide to Jazz Recordings awarded the album 4 stars, and called Summit Conference and Cerebral Caverns "cracking records made by top-flight players," commenting: "the Summit Conference group has a wish-list quality and delivers from the very start."

Writing for AllMusic, David R. Adler awarded the album 4.5 stars, calling it "inspired," and remarked: "By the usual standards of these highly adventurous players, the record is relatively accessible, but it does makes for challenging listening."

== Track listing ==
1. "Encounter" (John Carter) - 7:45
2. "Estelle's Theme" (Reggie Workman) - 4:05
3. "Conversation" (Sonelius Smith) - 10:13
4. "Meteor" (Sam Rivers) - 5:34
5. "Solace" (Sam Rivers)- 4:19
6. "Summit Conference" (Reggie Workman) - 8:32
7. "Breath" (Julian Priester) - 6:54
8. "Gone" (Andrew Hill) - 9:21

== Personnel ==
- Reggie Workman – bass
- Sam Rivers – tenor saxophone, soprano saxophone, flute
- Julian Priester – trombone
- Andrew Hill – piano
- Pheeroan akLaff – drums

== Production ==
- Ralph Simon – producer
- Sibyl R. Golden – executive producer
