= Refraction – Breakin' Glass =

Studio album by Trio 3 + Jason Moran
- Released: 2013
- Recorded: July 24–25, 2012
- Studio: Brooklyn Recording Studio, Brooklyn
- Genre: Jazz
- Length: 62:24
- Label: Intakt

Trio 3 chronology
Celebrating Mary Lou Williams–Live at Birdland New York (2011)	Refraction – Breakin' Glass (2013)	Wiring (2014)

Refraction – Breakin' Glass is an album by Trio 3, a jazz group consisting of saxophonist Oliver Lake, bassist Reggie Workman and drummer Andrew Cyrille, with guest pianist Jason Moran. It was recorded in 2012 and released by Intakt Records.

== Background ==
In 2012, Lake, Workman, Cyrille invited Jason Moran for a week long residency in New York's Jazzclub Birdland, before they recorded this album. Moran was the third guest piano player cooperating with Trio 3 after Irène Schweizer and Geri Allen. Moran's composition "Refraction", first presented by the pianist on his album Artist in Residence, is combined with Lake's recitation of his poem "Breakin' Glass". Cyrille's composition "High Priest" is a homage to the saxophonist David S. Ware, who died in 2012.

== Reception ==
Professional ratings
Review scores
Source	Rating
Down Beat	4/5 stars
Tom Hull – on the Web	A−
The Guardian	4/5 stars
All About Jazz	5/5 stars

The Down Beat review by Alain Drouot states "At this stage of their collaboration, Lake, Workman and Cyrille can operate in telepathic ways, and Moran does a fine job at finding his place, without being a distraction."

The All About Jazz review John Sharpe notes "Part of the joy of Trio 3 lies in the way even the relatively straightforward numbers feel on the edge of falling apart in a welter of delicious dissonance and arhythmic clatter, but never quite do."

Writing for The Guardian, John Fordham commented: "Long passages on this set still involve the uninhibited Lake unleashing wild, multiphonic sounds and high-end inquisitions, or Workman scurrying through tumbling group-improv episodes with dark bowed-bass slurs. But the set is full of good tunes, too, such as the nu-funky, distantly Bad Plus-like title track, Cyrille's free-swinging Listen and the jarring, exclamatory Vamp. Moran steers everybody with ingenious hooks, and his own loose-limbed solos show how inventive he can be whether the setup is prescriptive or non-existent."

In a review for The Santa Fe New Mexican, Bill Kohlhaase wrote: "This gathering of three septuagenarians and a 30-something pianist is a measure of where free jazz has landed some 50 years after its inception... Their work here with pianist Jason Moran is the classic free-jazz blend of form and formlessness, the sound defined by strange themes, the styles of the individual musicians, and the interplay between them... For all its improvisational anarchy, this music brings shape and substance to a form of jazz that’s often thought to contain neither."

== Track listing ==
1. "Refraction – Breakin' Glass" (Jason Moran, music; Oliver Lake, lyrics) – 4:53
2. "Cycle III " (Reggie Workman) – 5:49
3. "Luther's Lament" (Oliver Lake) – 3:41
4. "AM 2 1/2" (Andrew Cyrille) – 6:38
5. "Summit Conference" (Reggie Workman) – 10:53
6. "All Decks" (Oliver Lake) – 4:55
7. "Listen" (Andrew Cyrille) – 4:23
8. "Vamp" (Oliver Lake) – 5:09
9. "Foot Under Foot" (Jason Moran) – 8:42
10. "High Priest" (Andrew Cyrille) – 7:21

== Personnel ==
- Reggie Workman – bass
- Oliver Lake – alto saxophone, sopranino saxophone, voice
- Andrew Cyrille – drums, voice
- Jason Moran – piano
