= Postcards Records =

American jazz record company, 1993–1999

Postcards Records was an American jazz record company and label founded in 1993 by Ralph Simon and Sybil Golden. Through 1997 its catalogue included music by Paul Bley, Bill Frisell, Julian Priester, Gary Peacock, Sam Rivers, and Reggie Workman. In 1999, Arkadia Records bought Postcards, producing new recordings and reissuing the back catalog.

== Discography ==
Personnel	Album	Year	Catalog #
Paul Bley	Synth Thesis	1994	1001
Alan Pasqua, Dave Holland, Paul Motian, Gary Bartz, Randy Brecker	Dedications	1996	1012
John Clark, Trevor Clark, Stanton Davis, Bruce Ditmas, Alex Foster, Chris Hunter, Howard Johnson, Ryo Kawasaki, Pete Levin, Mike Richmond, Bob Stewart, Dave Taylor	I Will	2000	1016
Bruce Ditmas, John Abercrombie, Sam Rivers, Paul Bley, Dominic Richards	What If	1995	1007
Steve Kuhn, Tom Harrell, Bob Mintzer, Al Foster, George Mraz	Seasons of Romance	2000	1009
Harold Land, Billy Higgins, Bill Henderson, James Leary, Ray Ellis	A Lazy Afternoon	1999	1008
Alan Pasqua, Dave Holland, Michael Brecker, Jack DeJohnette, John Clark	Milagro	1994	1002
Gary Peacock, Bill Frisell	Just So Happens	1994	1005
Julian Priester, Sam Rivers, Tucker Martine	Hints on Light and Shadow	2000	1017
Ralph Simon, Gene Adler, Jeff Berman, Tom Beyer, David Dunaway, Billy Hart, Marc Johnson, Dan Rose, Chip White	As	1994	1004
Ralph Simon, Paul Bley, Gary Peacock, Julian Priester	Music for the Millennium	1996	1015
Bob Stewart, Dave Burrell, John Clark, Stanton Davis, Fred Griffen, Jerome Harris, Graham Haynes, Taj Mahal, Aaron Scott, Marshall Sealy, Steve Turre, Carlos Ward, Buddy Williams, James Zollar	Then & Now	2000	1014
Jorge Sylvester, Claudio Roditi, Santi Debriano, Bobby Sanabria	Musicollage	1996	1011
Joris Teepe, Don Braden, Chris Potter, David Hazeltine, Bruce Cox	For Adults Only	2000	1021
Reggie Workman, Andrew Hill, Sam Rivers, Julian Priester, Pheeroan akLaff	Summit Conference	2000	1003
Sam Rivers, Reggie Workman, Gerry Hemingway, Geri Allen, Julian Priester	Cerebral Caverns	1995	1010
Chip White, Gary Bartz, Steve Nelson, Robin Eubanks, Claudio Roditi	Harlem Sunset	1994	1006
