= Low Blue Flame =

Studio album by Andrew Cyrille
- Released: 2006
- Recorded: January 19, 2005
- Studio: Kampo Studios, New York City
- Genre: Jazz
- Length: 1:02:17
- Label: Tum Records; TUM CD 016
- Producer: Andrew Cyrille, Greg Osby

Andrew Cyrille chronology
Duo Palindrome 2002 (2004)	Low Blue Flame (2006)	Opus de Life (2009)

Low Blue Flame is an album by drummer Andrew Cyrille. It was recorded in January 2005 at Kampo Studios in New York City, and was released by Tum Records in 2006. On the album, Cyrille is joined by saxophonist Greg Osby. Cyrille and Osby met backstage after sharing a bill at a festival in France, and first performed publicly at Tonic in New York City in early 2004.

== Reception ==
Professional ratings
Review scores
Source	Rating
All About Jazz	4/5 stars
The Free Jazz Collective	4.5/5 stars

Brandt Reiter, in an article for All About Jazz, stated that the album is characterized by "melodic improvisation within a tight compositional framework, with intensity coming not from highflying pyrotechnics but synchronized, concentrated searching." He commented: "Rarely does Osby resort to the honks and squeals one would expect from this type of encounter, instead using his trademark lacerating tone to plumb the depths of each number... Cyrille's resources are seemingly limitless, his instincts uncanny and his choices startlingly right. He is, in short, magnificent and anyone interested in the varietal possibilities of the drums would do well to check out this disc."

A writer for The Free Jazz Collective commented: "when two of today's greatest jazz musicians play together, fireworks are the result. The veteran free jazz drummer demonstrates what experience and rhythmic creativity mean for music, while young alto and soprano saxophonist Greg Osby's warm and broad pallette really flourishes in this free and dynamic environment... anyone interested in drums and sax should have a close listen at how these two artists bring musical interaction to an almost sublime level... Another wonderful record which has almost gone unnoticed. Don't miss it."

A Squidco reviewer wrote: "Theirs is a mix of intricate improvisations and blues based riff work with a strong compositional sense amidst creative and advanced playing. A great and interesting perspective on traditional form and modern composition."

== Track listing ==
1. "Equalatogram" (Osby) - 3:05
2. "Work" (Thelonious Monk) - 4:24
3. "With You In Mind (Instrumental)" (Cyrille) - 3:30
4. "Cyrille In Motion" (Osby) - 5:38
5. "No. 11" (Cyrille) - 8:22
6. "Noodle" (Osby) - 3:29
7. "Striation" (Cyrille) - 4:28
8. "With You In Mind (Recital)" (Cyrille) - 3:47
9. "Low Blue Flame" (Cyrille) - 6:20
10. "Pop Pop" (Osby) - 3:22
11. "Concepticus" (Osby) - 3:33
12. "The Music In Us" (Cyrille) - 7:48
13. "Roscoe" (Cyrille) - 3:46

== Personnel ==
- Andrew Cyrille – drums
- Greg Osby – alto saxophone, soprano saxophone
