= Opus de Life =

Live album by Andrew Cyrille, Paul Dunmall, and Henry Grimes
- Released: June 16, 2009
- Recorded: June 14, 2008
- Venue: Vision Festival, Clemente Soto Velez Cultural and Educational Center, New York City
- Genre: Free jazz
- Label: Porter Records; PRCD - 4032
- Producer: Margaret Davis

Andrew Cyrille chronology
Low Blue Flame (2006)	Opus de Life (2009)	Route de Frères (2011)

Opus de Life is a live album by the Profound Sound Trio: drummer Andrew Cyrille, saxophonist Paul Dunmall, and bassist/violinist Henry Grimes. It was recorded in June 2008 at the Vision Festival held at the Clemente Soto Velez Cultural and Educational Center in New York City, and was released by Porter Records on June 16, 2009.

== Reception ==
Professional ratings
Review scores
Source	Rating
AllMusic	3.5/5 stars
All About Jazz	4/5 stars
Tom Hull – on the Web	A−

In a review for AllMusic, Michael G. Nastos wrote: "Incorporating three of the greatest improvisers in the original free jazz movement, the Profound Sound Trio certainly lives up to its name... this triad goes for all-out, rip-snorting energy music based on the post-modern precepts of John Coltrane, Archie Shepp, and even the outer rim of Albert Ayler... the PST deliver on all cylinders through this set of non-stop improvisations that allow all three members to stretch out without overtly exploiting the outer reaches of their instruments... There's a perfect symmetry between the players, solos are meted out judiciously... Amiri Baraka described freedom music as 'a terrible wholeness,' not in the pejorative but to underline the serious nature of African American expressionism, and how it should be taken without prejudice or dismissive whimsy. The Profound Sound Trio make it known to all they are in business to make sure they are heard in perfect clarity, with not a trace of mistaken identity."

Writing for Moment's Notice, Brian Morton commented: "Dunmall's characteristic approach is plain-spoken and artisanal, favoring straightforward narration over harmonic complexity, a hard-forged blacksmith's tone over anything overtly pretty or folkish. Paired with Andrew Cyrille and Henry Grimes, he sounds like a country boy who's just arrived in town but already shown he's the equal of anyone on the block, and with his own moves... The guys seemed to have as good a time as the crowd. Let's hope it’s a regular association."

== Track listing ==
1. "This Way, Please" – 15:16
2. "Call Paul" – 5:48
3. "Whirligigging" – 3:23
4. "Beyonder" – 17:24
5. "Futurity" – 7:28

== Personnel ==
- Paul Dunmall – tenor saxophone, bagpipes
- Henry Grimes – bass, violin
- Andrew Cyrille – drums
