= Double Clutch (album) =

Live album by Andrew Cyrille and Richard Teitelbaum
- Released: May 5, 1997
- Recorded: February 14, 1981
- Venue: Soundscape, New York City
- Genre: Free jazz
- Label: Silkheart Records; SHCD 146
- Producer: Verna Gillis

Andrew Cyrille chronology
Good to Go, with a Tribute to Bu (1997)	Double Clutch (1997)	Duo Palindrome 2002 (2004)

Double Clutch is a live album by drummer Andrew Cyrille and electronic musician Richard Teitelbaum. It was recorded in February 1981 at Soundscape in New York City, and was released by Silkheart Records on May 5, 1997.

Cyrille and Teitelbaum first recorded together on the 1979 Leroy Jenkins album Space Minds, New Worlds, Survival of America. Teitelbaum appeared on Cyrille's 2016 album The Declaration of Musical Independence.

== Reception ==
Professional ratings
Review scores
Source	Rating
AllMusic	1/5 stars
The Penguin Guide to Jazz	3.5/4 stars

The authors of the Penguin Guide to Jazz Recordings awarded the album 3½ stars, and wrote: "Teitelbaum is responsive and highly imaginative, making chill technology sound lively and breathing. The three major pieces... are beautifully balanced performances, and it would be difficult to fault the recording."

In an article for Jazz Times, Bill Milkowski called the album a "provocative, adventurous encounter between the intuitive drum master and the remarkable pre-MIDI analog synth pioneer," and commented: "Paired here with the random squeaks, skronks and tweet-twiddle-dee-breeeees of brainiac Teitelbaum's square-wave generator and single-board digital processor, Cyrille reacts instinctively and entirely without clichés on this freely improvised session... No, it ain't swinging. One must have an open mind to take in this 'difficult music.' But for those who can deal with the melding of cold technology and the human spirit, Double Clutch strikes an intriguing chord indeed."

Scott Yanow, writing for AllMusic, stated that the "collaboration comes across essentially as a long Cyrille drum solo joined by Teitelbaum's bizarre electronic sounds. Although some of the textures are colorful, much of the playing seems rather random, aimless and ultimately pointless."

== Track listing ==
All compositions by Andrew Cyrille and Richard Teitelbaum.

1. "Dance Astral" – 9:07
2. "San Andreas Fault" – 13:04
3. "Cluck Cluck Clock" – 11:13
4. "Double Clutch" – 15:52
5. "Sliding on a Bubble" – 9:58
6. "Driving Pistons" – 12:36

== Personnel ==
- Andrew Cyrille – drums, cymbal, percussion
- Richard Teitelbaum – synthesizer, electronics
