= Reggie Workman =

American jazz double bassist

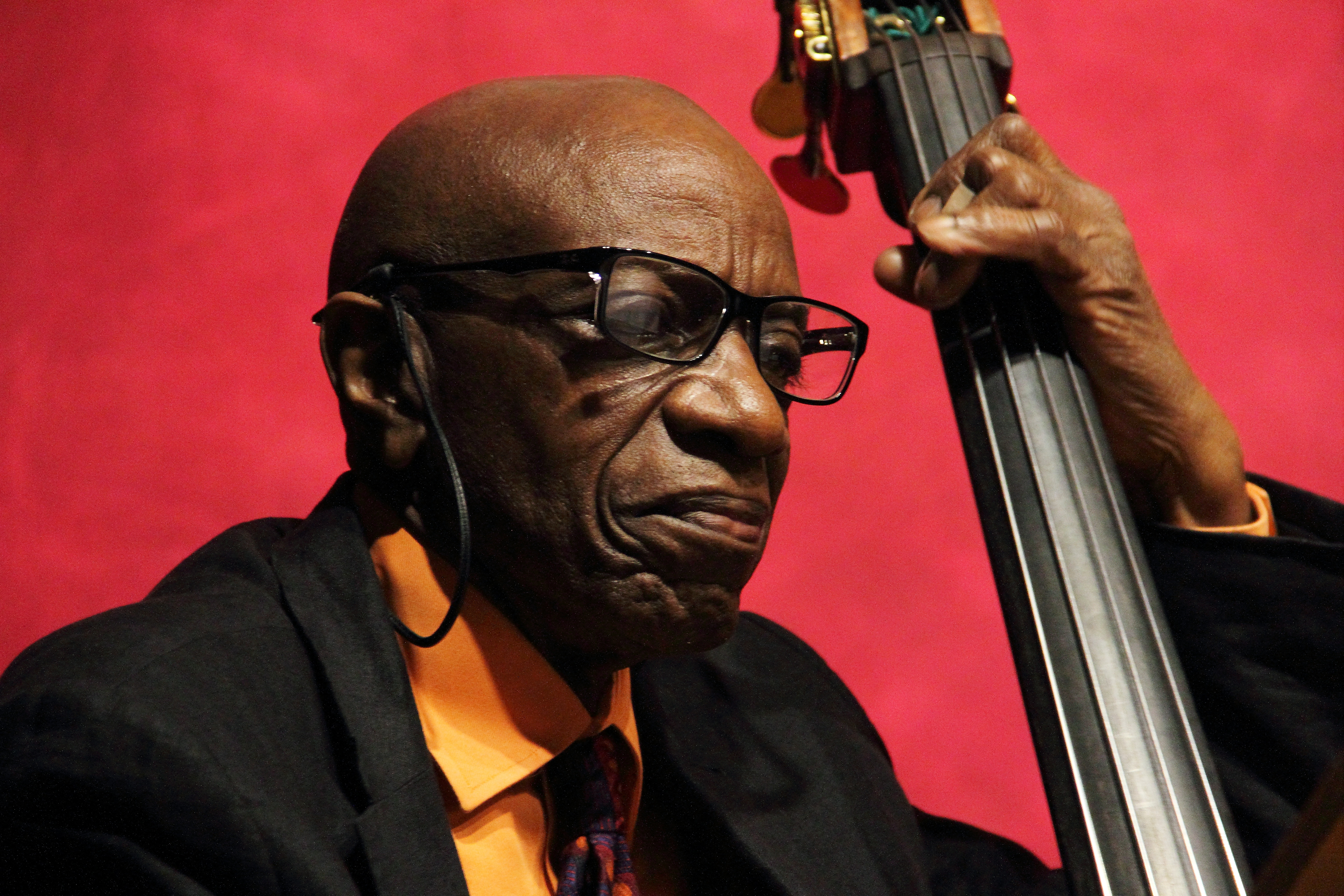
- Workman in 2016

Background information
- Born: Reginald Workman; June 26, 1937 (age 88); Philadelphia, Pennsylvania, U.S.
- Genres: Jazz; avant-garde jazz; hard bop
- Occupations: Musician; composer; educator
- Instrument: Double bass
- Labels: Soul Note; Evidence; Baybridge; Prestige; Postcards; Leo; Music & Arts
- Website: reggieworkmanmusic.com

Reginald "Reggie" Workman (born June 26, 1937) is an American avant-garde jazz and hard bop double bassist, recognized for his work with both John Coltrane and Art Blakey, in addition to Alice Coltrane, Mal Waldron, Max Roach, Archie Shepp, Trio Three (with Oliver Lake and Andrew Cyrille), Trio Transition, the Reggie Workman Ensemble, and collaborative projects with dance, poetry and drama.

== Career ==
Early in his career, Workman worked in jazz groups led by Freddie Cole, Gigi Gryce, Donald Byrd, Duke Jordan and Booker Little. In 1961, Workman joined the John Coltrane Quartet, replacing Steve Davis. He was present for the saxophonist's Live at the Village Vanguard sessions, and also recorded with a second bassist (Art Davis) on the 1961 album, Olé Coltrane. Workman left Coltrane's group at the end of the year, following a European tour and recording Africa Brass.

In 1962, Workman joined Art Blakey's Jazz Messengers (replacing long-time Blakey bassist Jymie Merritt), and worked alongside Freddie Hubbard, Wayne Shorter, and Cedar Walton for most of his time. Workman left Blakey's group in 1964.

Workman also played with Freddie Cole, Lee Morgan, James Moody, Yusef Lateef, Pharoah Sanders, Herbie Mann and Thelonious Monk. He has recorded with Archie Shepp, Lee Morgan and David Murray. Workman, with pianist Tommy Flanagan and drummer Joe Chambers, formed The Super Jazz Trio in 1978.

As of 1987, he was a professor at The New School for Jazz and Contemporary Music in New York City, and was a member of the group, Trio 3, with Oliver Lake and Andrew Cyrille. In 1984 he started an on-going performance arts collaborations with writer/director/choreographer Maya Milenovic Workman. Recent works include: "Dos Worlds" "Ophelia's Ocean" & "Guernica Continuum."

== Personal life ==
Workman has three children, Nioka Workman (cellist), Olu Workman (entrepreneur), and Ayana Workman (actor/dancer/poet). Workman lived in Montclair, NJ from 1994 - 2005 and is currently a resident of Harlem, New York City.

== Honors and awards ==
In 1997, Workman was named as the recipient of a Life Achievement Award by the Jazz Foundation of America and was awarded a citation of excellence by the International Association of Jazz Educators. In 1999, the Mid Atlantic Arts Foundation presented him with its Living Legacy Award. In 2020, he received a Guggenheim Fellowship in music composition in collaboration with Maya Milenovic Workman and was named by the National Endowment of the Arts an NEA Jazz Master.

== Discography ==
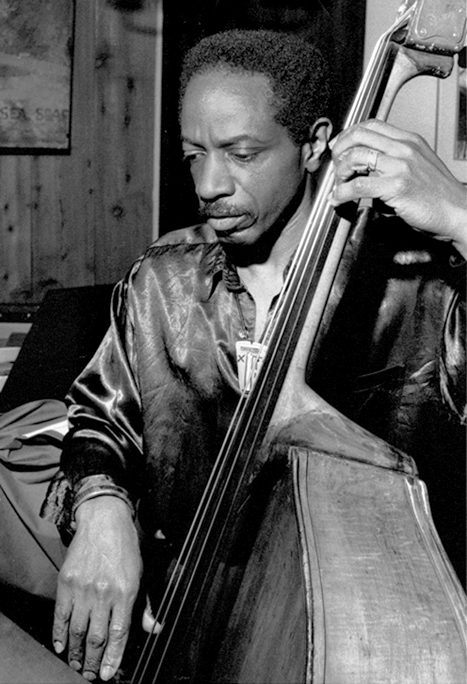
Workman at Bach Dancing & Dynamite Society, Half Moon Bay CA 4/2/89

=== As leader/co-leader ===
- 1977: Conversation with Cecil Bridgewater, Slide Hampton, George Adams, Albert Dailey, Michael Carvin, Lawrence Killian (Denon, 1979)
- 1978: The Works of Workman (Denon, 1979)
- 1986: Synthesis (Leo)
- 1989: Images (Music & Arts)
- 1993: Altered Spaces (Leo)
- 1994: Summit Conference (Postcards)
- 1995: Cerebral Caverns (Postcards)

With the Super Jazz Trio

- City with Hidefumi Toki (Baystate, 1978)
- The Super Jazz Trio (Baystate, 1979) – rec. 1978
- Something Tasty With Art Farmer (Baystate, 1979)
- The Standard (Baystate, 1980)

With Trio Transition

- Trio Transition (DIW, 1987)
- Trio Transition with Special Guest Oliver Lake (DIW, 1988)

With Trio 3

- Live in Willisau (Dizim, 1997)
- Encounter (Passin' Thru, 2000)
- Open Ideas (Palmetto, 2002)
- Time Being (Intakt, 2006)
- Wha's Nine: Live at the Sunset (Marge, 2008)
- Berne Concert with Irene Schweizer (Intakt, 2009)
- At This Time (Intakt, 2009)
- Celebrating Mary Lou Williams–Live at Birdland New York with Geri Allen (Intakt, 2011)
- Refraction – Breakin' Glass (Intakt, 2013)
- Wiring (Intakt, 2014)
- Visiting Texture (Intakt, 2017)

=== As supporting artist ===
With Juhani Aaltonen

- Strings Revisited (Tum, 2002)
- Reflections (Tum, 2004) with Andrew Cyrille
- Prana / Live at Groovy (Leo, 1982)

With Roy Ayers

- Virgo Vibes (Atlantic, 1967)

With Gary Bartz

- Another Earth (Milestone, 1969)

With Art Blakey

- Caravan (Riverside, 1963)
- Ugetsu (Riverside, 1963)
- Free for All (Blue Note, 1964)
- Kyoto (Riverside, 1964)
- Indestructible (Blue Note, 1964)
- Golden Boy (Colpix, 1964)

With Hamiet Bluiett

- Orchestra Duet and Septet (Chiaroscuro, 1977)

With The Bridgewater Brothers

- Lightning and Thunder (Denon, 1977)
- Generation Suite (Denon, 1978)

With Roy Brooks

- Ethnic Expressions (Im-Hotep, 1973)
- Live At Town Hall (Baystate, 1978)

With Marion Brown

- Vista (Impulse!, 1975)
- Passion Flower (Baystate, 1978)

With Donald Byrd

- Byrd in Flight (Blue Note, 1960)

With Don Byron

- Tuskegee Experiments (Nonesuch, 1990-91 [1992])

With Steve Cohn

- Shapes, Sounds, Theories (Cadence Jazz, 1984)
- Bridge Over the X-Stream (Leo, 1999)

With Earl Coleman

- Manhattan Serenade (1968)

With Johnny Coles

- Katumbo (Mainstream, 1971)

With Adegoke Steve Colson

- The Untarnished Dream (Silver Sphinx, 2009)

With Alice Coltrane

- World Galaxy (Impulse!, 1972)
- Transfiguration (Warner Bros. Master, 1978)

With John Coltrane

- Africa/Brass (Impulse!, 1961)
- Ole Coltrane (Atlantic, 1961)
- The Complete Copenhagen Concert (Magnetic, 1961)
- Coltrane "Live" at the Village Vanguard (Impulse!, 1961 [1962])
- The Complete 1961 Village Vanguard Recordings (Impulse!, 1961 [1997]) – contains recordings also on Impressions and the above release
- Newport '63 (Impulse!, 1961 [1993])
- Ballads (Impulse!, 1961-1962 [1963])
- Impressions (Impulse!, 1961–1963 [1963])
- Live Trane: The European Tours (Pablo, 1961-1963 [2001])
- So Many Things: The European Tour 1961 (Acrobat, 1961 [2015])
- Evenings at the Village Gate: John Coltrane with Eric Dolphy (Impulse!, 1961 [2023])

With Stanley Cowell

- Brilliant Circles (Freedom, 1972)
- Such Great Friends (1983) with Billy Harper and Billy Hart

With Marilyn Crispell

- Gaia (Leo, 1988)
- Live in San Francisco (Music & Arts, 1989)
- Live in Zurich (Leo, 1990)
- Circles (Les Disques Victo, 1991)
- Highlights from the Summer of 1992 American Tour (Music & Arts, 1993)

With Andrew Cyrille

- My Friend Louis (DIW, 1992)

With Sussan Deyhim

- Madman of God: Divine Love Songs of the Persian Sufi Masters (Cramworld, 2000)
- Shy Angels: Reconstruction and Mix Translation of Madman of God (Cramworld, 2002) with Bill Laswell

With Bill Dixon

- Intents and Purposes (RCA, 1967)

With Eric Dolphy

- Softly, As in a Morning Sunrise (Natasha, 1961)

With Booker Ervin

- The Trance (Prestige, 1965)
- Setting the Pace (Prestige, 1965) – with Dexter Gordon

With Mario Escalera

- Blue Mondays (Phoenix, 1981)

With Chris Fagan

- Lost Bohemia (Open Minds, 1992)

With Art Farmer

- New York Jazz Sextet: Group Therapy (Scepter, 1966)

With Sonny Fortune

- Awakening (Horizon, 1975)
- In the Spirit of John Coltrane (Shanachie, 2000)

With Hal Galper

- Art-Work (Origin, 2008)

With Grant Green

- Goin' West (Blue Note, 1962)

With Gigi Gryce

- Saying Somethin'! (New Jazz, 1960)
- Reminiscin' (Mercury, 1960)

With Billy Harper

- Capra Black (Strata-East, 1973)

With Andrew Hill

- Grass Roots (Blue Note, 1968 [2000])

With Terumasa Hino

- Love Nature (Canyon/Love, 1971)
- Peace and Love (Canyon/Love, 1971)
- A Part (Canyon/Love, 1971)
- Double Rainbow (CBS/Sony, 1981)

With Takehiro Honda

- Jodo (Trio, 1972)

With Freddie Hubbard

- Hub-Tones (Blue Note, 1962)
- Here to Stay (Blue Note, 1962)
- The Body & the Soul (Impulse!, 1964)
- The Black Angel (Atlantic, 1970)

With Bobby Hutcherson

- Patterns (Blue Note, 1968)

With The Jazz Composer's Orchestra

- The Jazz Composer's Orchestra (JCOA, 1968)

With Elvin Jones

- Brother John (1982)

With Clifford Jordan

- Hello, Hank Jones (Eastworld, 1978)

With Duke Jordan

- Flight to Jordan (Blue Note, 1960)

With Oliver Lake

- Again and Again (Gramavision, 1991)
- Edge-ing (Black Saint, 1993)

With Yusef Lateef

- 1984 (Impulse!, 1965)
- Psychicemotus (Impulse!, 1965)
- A Flat, G Flat and C (Impulse!, 1966)

With Booker Little

- Booker Little and Friend (Bethlehem, 1961)

With Living Colour

- Time's Up (Epic, 1990)

With Herbie Mann

- Our Mann Flute (Atlantic, 1966)
- Impressions of the Middle East (Atlantic, 1966)
- A Mann & A Woman (Atlantic, 1966) with Tamiko Jones
- The Beat Goes On (Atlantic, 1967)
- The Wailing Dervishes (Atlantic, 1967)
- New Mann at Newport (Atlantic, 1967)

With Miya Masaoka

- Monk's Japanese Folk Song (Dizim, 1997)

With Cristina Mazza

- Where Are You? (Il Posto, 1989)

With Ken McIntyre

- Home (SteepleChase, 1975)

With Roscoe Mitchell

- In Walked Buckner (Delmark, 1999)

With Grachan Moncur III

- Shadows (Denon, 1977)

With James Moody

- Running The Gamut (Scepter, 1965)

With Lee Morgan

- Search For The New Land (Blue Note, 1964)
- Infinity (Blue Note, 1965 [1981])
- Caramba! (blue Note, 1968)
- Taru (Blue Note, 1968)
- Live in Baltimore 1968 (Fresh Sound Records, 1968) with Clifford Jordan
- The Last Session (Blue Note, 1971 [1972])

With David Murray

- Morning Song (Black Saint, 1983)

With New York Art Quartet

- Mohawk (Fontana, 1965)
- 35th Reunion (DIW, 2000)
- Call It Art (Triple Point, 2013)

With Dave Pike

- It's Time for Dave Pike (Riverside, 1961)

With Sam Rivers

- Crystals (Verve, 1974)

With Max Roach

- Nommo (Victor, 1976)
- Live in Tokyo (Denon, 1977)
- The Loadstar (Horo, 1977)
- Live in Amsterdam (Baystate, 1977)

With Charlie Rouse

- We Paid Our Dues! (Epic, 1961)

With Hilton Ruiz

- Fantasia (Denon, 1977)

With Pharoah Sanders

- Karma (1969)

With Ellen May Shashoyan

- Song For My Father (New Ark, 1989)

With Archie Shepp

- Archie Shepp – Bill Dixon Quartet (1962)
- Four for Trane (Impulse!, 1964)
- The Magic of Ju-Ju (Impulse!, 1967)
- Ballads for Trane (Denon, 1977)
- Live in New York (Verve, 2001) with Roswell Rudd

With Wayne Shorter

- Night Dreamer (1964)
- JuJu (1964)
- Adam's Apple (1966)

With Sonny Simmons

- American Jungle (1997)

With Heiner Stadler

- Brains on Fire (Labor Records, 1966–73)
- Ecstasy (Labor, 1973) with Walter Steffens
- A Tribute to Monk and Bird (Tomato, 1978) with Thad Jones, George Adams, George Lewis, Stanley Cowell, and Lenny White
- Jazz Alchemy (Tomato, 1989)

With Sonny Stitt

- Moonlight in Vermont (Denon, 1977)

With Monnette Sudler

- Other Side of the Gemini (Hardly, 1988)

With Aki Takase

- Clapping Music (Enja, 1995)

With Horace Tapscott

- Aiee! The Phantom (Arabesque, 1996)

With John Tchicai and Andrew Cyrille

- Witch's Scream (TUM, 2006)

With Charles Tolliver

- Live at the Loosdrecht Jazz Festival (Strata-East, 1973)
- Impact (Strata-East, 1975)
- Emperor March: Live at the Blue Note (Half Note, 2008)

With Mickey Tucker

- Blues in Five Dimensions (SteepleChase, 1989)

With Edward Vesala

- Heavy Life (Leo, 1980)

With Mal Waldron

- Up Popped the Devil (Enja, 1973)
- Breaking New Ground (Baybridge 1983)
- Mal Waldron Plays Eric Satie (Baybridge, 1983)
- You and the Night and the Music (Paddle Wheel, 1983)
- The Git Go - Live at the Village Vanguard (Soul Note, 1986)
- The Seagulls of Kristiansund (Soul Note, 1986)
- The Super Quartet Live at Sweet Basil (Paddle Wheel, 1987)
- Crowd Scene (Soul Note, 1989)
- Where Are You? (Soul Note, 1989)
- My Dear Family (Evidence, 1993)
- Soul Eyes (BMG, 1997)

With Cedar Walton

- Soul Cycle (Prestige, 1969)

With Tyrone Washington

- Natural Essence (1967)

With Richard Williams

- New Horn in Town (Candid, 1960)

With Frank Wright

- Kevin, My Dear Son (Sun, 1979)

With Attila Zoller

- Gypsy Cry (Embryo Records, 1970)
