= Andrew Cyrille Meets Brötzmann in Berlin =

Live album by Andrew Cyrille and Peter Brötzmann
- Released: 1983
- Recorded: March 19–21, 1982
- Venue: Workshop Freie Musik, Academy of Arts, Berlin
- Genre: Free jazz
- Label: FMP; FMP 1000
- Producer: Jost Gebers, Peter Brötzmann

Andrew Cyrille chronology
The Navigator (1982)	Andrew Cyrille Meets Brötzmann in Berlin (1983)	Something in Return (1988)

Andrew Cyrille Meets Brötzmann in Berlin is a live album by percussionist Andrew Cyrille and saxophonist Peter Brötzmann, recorded in 1982 at the Workshop Freie Musik, Academy of Arts, Berlin, and released in 1983 by FMP.

== Reception ==
Professional ratings
Review scores
Source	Rating
AllMusic	4/5 stars
The Penguin Guide to Jazz	3/4 stars
Tom Hull – on the Web	B+

The authors of the Penguin Guide to Jazz Recordings awarded the album 3 stars, and commented: "One does not normally think of the saxophonist as a lyrical player and, while much of his tenor and baritone work is entirely consistent with past form, he also produces gentle, almost folksy, sounds on the second of two extended improvisations... Cyrille's ability to create a whole orchestra of effects from a relatively standard kit is undiminished, and the album as a whole is surprisingly entire and satisfying for such an uncompromising format."

In a review for All About Jazz, Tim Niland wrote: "A live meeting between multi-reedist Peter Brotzmann and drummer and percussionist Andrew Cryille [sic] seems like a match made in free-jazz heaven ... this album lives up to its potential with strong, powerful playing and potent, thoughtful interplay between the musicians."

The editors of AllMusic awarded the album 4 stars.

== Track listing ==
1. "Wolf Whistle" (Brötzmann) – 23:44
2. "Quilt (Part A)" (Cyrille) – 9:25
3. "Quilt (Part B)" (Cyrille) – 7:13
4. "Quilt (Part C)" (Cyrille) – 3:05

== Personnel ==
- Andrew Cyrille – drums, percussion
- Peter Brötzmann – alto saxophone, tenor saxophone, baritone saxophone, tárogató, clarinet
