= The Navigator (Andrew Cyrille album) =

Studio album by Andrew Cyrille
- Released: 1982
- Recorded: September 21 & 22, 1982
- Genre: Jazz
- Length: 44:39
- Label: Soul Note
- Producer: Giovanni Bonandrini

Andrew Cyrille chronology
Special People (1980)	The Navigator (1982)	Andrew Cyrille Meets Brötzmann in Berlin (1983)

The Navigator is an album by American jazz drummer Andrew Cyrille, recorded in 1982 for the Italian Soul Note label.

== Reception ==
Professional ratings
Review scores
Source	Rating
AllMusic	4/5 stars
The Penguin Guide to Jazz Recordings	4/4 stars
The Rolling Stone Jazz Record Guide	3/5 stars
Tom Hull – on the Web	B+

The AllMusic review by Ron Wynn stated: "This is an example of thoughtful, nicely played group improvisation". The authors of The Penguin Guide to Jazz Recordings awarded the album 4 stars, and wrote that it demonstrates Cyrille's "increasing interest in an Africanized language for jazz... each of the players introduces a section, adding bearings and compass points to a collective navigation back to the source. As with many of Cyrille's records, it asserts the jazz tradition by seeming to shed it, layer by layer. What this and the earlier Metamusicians' Stomp seem to suggest is that, the further jazz goes back towards its point of ancestral departure, the more completely it is itself."

== Track listing ==
All compositions by Andrew Cyrille except as indicated

1. "Through the Ages Jehovah" (Andrew Cyrille, Leroy Jenkins) - 4:36
2. "The Navigator" - 9:46
3. "Module" (Cyrille, Ted Daniel) - 3:57
4. "Music in Us" - 5:30
5. "So That Life Can Endure...P.S. With Love" - 10:04
6. "Circumfusion/The Magnificent Bimbo" - 10:46

- Recorded at Cyrille in Milano, Italy on September 21 & 22, 1982

== Personnel ==
- Andrew Cyrille - drums, percussion
- Ted Daniel - trumpet, flugelhorn
- Sonelius Smith - piano
- Nick Di Geronimo - bass
