= Music Delivery/Percussion =

Studio album by Andrew Cyrille
- Released: January 20, 2023
- Recorded: January 17 and 18, 2022
- Studio: Sound On Sound Recording, Montclair, New Jersey
- Genre: Free jazz
- Label: Intakt; CD 385
- Producer: Andrew Cyrille

Andrew Cyrille chronology
Evocation (2022)	Music Delivery/Percussion (2023)

Music Delivery/Percussion is a solo album by percussionist Andrew Cyrille. It was recorded on January 17 and 18, 2022, at Sound On Sound Recording in Montclair, New Jersey, and was released on January 20, 2023 through Intakt Records.

Music Delivery/Percussion is Cyrille's third solo percussion release, following What About? (BYG, 1969) and The Loop (Ictus, 1978). Regarding his thoughts on the recording, he commented: "I wanted to have a variety of percussion instruments in the compositions. So I was thinking of melodies that could be played with tambourines, bells, cymbals, crotales, gongs, and mallets."

== Reception ==
Professional ratings
Review scores
Source	Rating
All About Jazz	4/5 stars
Tom Hull – on the Web	B+

In a review for All About Jazz, Mark Corroto wrote: "If Andrew Cyrille were a painter, he'd be Georges Seurat. If he were a poet, E. E. Cummings; a Tour de France Champion, Jacque Anqutiel; or a writer, Ian McEwan. The above masters are mentioned because Cyrille shares a command of colors, efficiency, grace, and language with his instrument equal to doyens in other disciplines."

The Free Jazz Collective's Stef Gijssels commented: "Cyrille emphasises the melodic aspect of his art. This is not always obvious to hear at first listen, but keep up the effort and keep listening. There are moments of fun, of small side-stories, with more dramatic excursions and a wonderful sense of fluidity. No wonder he's still so good after so many decades of musicianship. Magic at work!"

Terrell K. Holmes of The New York City Jazz Record called the album "evocative and inspiring," and stated that the "pulsating energy and joy with which he plays... is what makes Music Delivery/Percussion such a wonderful album." The editors of the NYCJR included the recording in their list of "best solo albums" of 2023.

Writing for The Quietus, Peter Margasak remarked: "At age 83... Cyrille continues to operate with dazzling clarity and directness... But nothing of late captures the precision and crispness of his conception like this new solo recording, where Cyrille investigates specific ideas across eleven pieces... communicating the melodic and rhythmic essence of those pieces without any sort of melodic instrument."

A reviewer for Best of Jazz wrote: "The framework of the tracks and the incredible layers of rhythms... makes Music Delivery/Percussion a must-listen for all drum lovers, but he excels at playing each rhythm and makes the impossible look so simple that it is also must-listen for all music lovers in general."

== Track listing ==
1. "Thruway" (Andrew Cyrille) – 3:06
2. "Bernard Albert Wilkinson" (Andrew Cyrille) – 4:56
3. "La Ibkey (Don't Cry)" (Andrew Cyrille) – 3:00
4. "Metallic Resonance" (Andrew Cyrille) – 5:36
5. "Jumping in the Sugar Bowl" (Amina Claudine Myers) – 5:46
6. "Water Water Water" (Andrew Cyrille) – 2:46
7. "Cowbell Ecstasy" (Andrew Cyrille) – 3:31
8. "Enter From the East" (John Carter) – 2:57
9. "Tambourine Cocktail" (Andrew Cyrille) – 3:07
10. "Threading a Needle" (Andrew Cyrille) – 2:58
11. "For Girls Dancing" (Andrew Cyrille) – 5:24

== Personnel ==
- Andrew Cyrille – drums, percussion
