= Open Ideas =

Studio album by Trio 3
- Released: 2002
- Recorded: October 22 & 23, 2001
- Studio: Maggie's Farm, Pipersville, Pennsylvania
- Genre: Jazz
- Length: 50:35
- Label: Palmetto
- Producer: Matt Balitsaris

Trio 3 chronology
Encounter (2000)	Open Ideas (2002)	Time Being (2006)

Open Ideas is an album by Trio 3, a jazz group consisting of saxophonist Oliver Lake, bassist Reggie Workman and drummer Andrew Cyrille. It was recorded in 2001 and released on the Palmetto label.

== Reception ==
Professional ratings
Review scores
Source	Rating
AllMusic	3/5 stars

In his review for AllMusic, Jonathan Widran states that "Not every tune has a strong focus, as the title track almost seems like an avant-garde experiment searching for a slight melody halfway through."

Joel Roberts, in a review for All About Jazz, wrote: "These veterans of the avant-jazz wars... combine musical excellence and compositional skills with a shared sensibility that's well summed up by the album's title, Open Ideas... There's a staggering amount of knowledge and history on display here... While the trio's roots stretch back to the free-jazz movement of the '60s... and none of its members has ever shied away from tackling difficult music, this set makes for highly accessible, though challenging, listening. Not just for avant-gardists, Open Ideas is recommended for all those with open ears."

== Track listing ==
1. "Casino" (Andrew Cyrille) – 6:28
2. "Hooray for Herbie" (Mal Waldron) – 6:27
3. "Open Ideas" (Cyrille, Lake, Workman) – 5:46
4. "Y2 Chaos" (Reggie Workman) – 5:24
5. "Prophet's Path" (Reggie Workman) – 8:14
6. "Valley Sketch" (Oliver Lake) – 3:50
7. "Willow Song" (Reggie Workman) – 4:24
8. "5-4-3-2" (Andrew Cyrille) – 6:05
9. "Dance 2" (Oliver Lake) – 3:57

== Personnel ==
- Oliver Lake – saxophone
- Reggie Workman – bass
- Andrew Cyrille – drums
