= So Many Things: The European Tour 1961 =

Live album by The John Coltrane Quintet Featuring Eric Dolphy
- Released: 2015
- Recorded: November 1961
- Venues: Paris, Copenhagen, Helsinki, Stockholm
- Genre: Jazz
- Length: 4:47:01
- Labels: Acrobat Music; ACQCD7085

So Many Things: The European Tour 1961 is a 4–CD compilation album by American saxophonist John Coltrane containing music recorded live during the 1961 European tour, which took place under the auspices of Norman Granz's Jazz at the Philharmonic programs. The album, which features Coltrane on tenor and soprano saxophones along with multi-instrumentalist Eric Dolphy, pianist McCoy Tyner, bassist Reggie Workman, and drummer Elvin Jones, was released in 2015 by Acrobat Music.

The 1961 European tour took place from November 11 through December 4, and immediately followed the Coltrane quintet's stay at the Village Vanguard (captured on Coltrane "Live" at the Village Vanguard and The Complete 1961 Village Vanguard Recordings). During the tour, the group was paired with the Dizzy Gillespie Quintet. The tour consisted of a UK portion (Kilburn (London), Birmingham, Glasgow, Newcastle, Leicester, Brighton, and Walthamstow (London)) from November 11–17, followed by a continental visit (Paris, Scheveningen, Amsterdam, Copenhagen, Gothenburg, Helsinki, Stockholm, Hannover, Hamburg, Copenhagen (again), Stuttgart, Düsseldorf, Frankfurt am Main, Nuremberg, Munich, Berlin, and Baden-Baden) from November 18–December 4. Some of the music that appears on So Many Things was previously issued on Live in Stockholm 1961 (LeJazz, 1996), Live Trane: The European Tours (Pablo, 2001), and The Complete Copenhagen Concert (Magnetic, 2009), but is heard here in remastered form.

The album title was taken from an interview during which Coltrane stated: "There are so many things to be considered in making music... Many things on which I don't think I've reached a final conclusion."

== Reception ==
Professional ratings
Review scores
Source	Rating
All About Jazz	5/5 stars
AllMusic	4/5 stars
The Guardian	3/5 stars
Jazzwise	5/5 stars
Uncut	4.5/5 stars

Colin Fleming of JazzTimes wrote: "This stuff is rare: air shots and field recordings in varying quality but all of it listenable-and all of it headstrong, manful and galvanizing... This is one ripped-open world, jazz like jazz had never really been, core heat advancing upon the surface."

In a review for The Guardian, John Fordham stated that the musicians' "fearless stretching of the postbop envelope remains enthralling (at times even shocking) in its intensity, and the set pinpoints how the same pieces... change from night to night... Acoustics are inevitably uneven, but students of Coltrane's gamechanging work at a conceptual turning point won't mind that."

Uncut's Richard Williams commented: "The sound quality varies from patchy to excellent but the flame of discovery burns throughout... This diligently compiled set is as close as we'll get to a souvenir of his profound effect on European listeners."

Writing for Jazzwise, Stuart Nicholson awarded the album a full five stars, and noted that Dolphy "enjoys a far more central role within the group than he did" on previous releases with the group.

Larson Sutton of Jambands.com remarked: "In hindsight, So Many Things could be viewed as a tipping point for John Coltrane; a moment of conscious evolution in his playing and his ambitions. It should also be recognized as a moment of tremendous foresight for Coltrane, to see what he'd done prior to be preparation for what was to come."

In an article for Relix, Jeff Tamarkin wrote: "Coltrane was just finding, at this juncture, how much adventurousness he could get away with; the European audiences he encountered in November 1961 were more than willing to support that quest, and the quintet jumped in without looking back."

Jazz Weekly's George W. Harris stated: "The takes here have Coltrane and the rhythm team bearing down like a closing reliever, and with Eric Dolphy joining in on alto, it's just a joy to behold... The various versions are distinct enough to make you want to imbibe each one. This is a real keeper, and a reminder of an era when jazz actually set the pace in modern music."

Robert Baird of Stereophile commented: "While this set pays the usual lip service to being 'newly remastered,' only so much can be done with source material of this quality and vintage. While nothing here is unlistenable, the sound varies from good to poor. It's a Coltrane concert coming out of a tin can. But what music!"

In a review for The Seattle Times, Paul de Barros called the album "a must-have for any self-respecting Coltrane head," and remarked: "the tour catches the saxophonist in a revealing, previously undocumented transition, playing popular mainstays from his earlier recorded repertoire... but in a fierce, obsessive, rhythmically broken style... At these concerts, you can hear Coltrane moving toward the more abstract, obsessive approach that would consume him later."

== Track listing ==
Disc 1

1. "Blue Train" (John Coltrane) – 16:04
2. "I Want to Talk About You" (Billy Eckstine) – 6:51
3. "Impressions" (John Coltrane) – 10:49
4. "My Favorite Things" (Oscar Hammerstein II, Richard Rodgers) – 22:29
5. "Blue Train" (John Coltrane) – 12:45
- Recorded on November 18, 1961, at L'Olympia in Paris.

Disc 2

1. "I Want to Talk About You" (Billy Eckstine) – 9:39
2. "My Favorite Things" (Oscar Hammerstein II, Richard Rodgers) – 25:30
3. "Announcement" – 2:24
4. "Delilah" (Victor Young) – 11:59
5. "Ev'ry Time We Say Goodbye" (Cole Porter) – 5:00
6. "Impressions" (John Coltrane) – 13:52
7. "Naima" (John Coltrane) – 7:33
- Tracks 1 and 2 were recorded on November 18, 1961, at L'Olympia in Paris. Tracks 3–7 were recorded on November 20, 1961, at the Falkoner Centret in Copenhagen.

Disc 3

1. "My Favorite Things" (false start) (Oscar Hammerstein II, Richard Rodgers) / "Announcement" – 0:59
2. "My Favorite Things" (Oscar Hammerstein II, Richard Rodgers) – 28:53
3. "Blue Train" (John Coltrane) – 9:30
4. "I Want to Talk About You" (Billy Eckstine) – 7:20
5. "Impressions" (John Coltrane) – 8:25
6. "My Favorite Things" (Oscar Hammerstein II, Richard Rodgers) – 21:04
- Tracks 1–2 were recorded on November 20, 1961, at the Falkoner Centret in Copenhagen. Tracks 3–6 were recorded on November 22, 1961, at the Kulttuuritalo in Helsinki.

Disc 4

1. "Blue Train" (John Coltrane) – 8:58
2. "Naima" (John Coltrane) – 4:07
3. "Impressions" (John Coltrane) – 7:21
4. "My Favorite Things" (Oscar Hammerstein II, Richard Rodgers) – 20:28
5. "My Favorite Things" (Oscar Hammerstein II, Richard Rodgers) – 25:01
- Recorded on November 23, 1961, at the Konserthuset in Stockholm.

== Personnel ==
- John Coltrane – tenor saxophone, soprano saxophone
- Eric Dolphy – alto saxophone, bass clarinet, flute
- McCoy Tyner – piano
- Reggie Workman – double bass
- Elvin Jones – drums
