= Andrew Cyrille =

American avant-garde jazz drummer

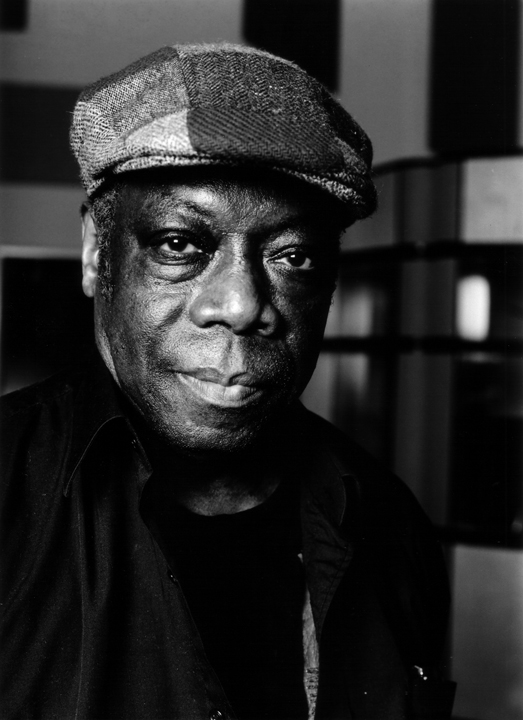
- photo by Shawn Brackbill

Background information
- Born: Andrew Charles Cyrille; November 10, 1939 (age 86)
- Origin: Brooklyn, New York, U.S.
- Genres: Jazz, avant-garde jazz, post-bop
- Occupations: Musician, bandleader
- Instrument: Drums

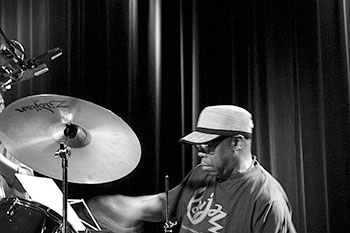
Andrew Cyrille

Andrew Charles Cyrille (born November 10, 1939) is an American avant-garde jazz drummer. Throughout his career, he has performed both as a leader and a sideman in the bands of Walt Dickerson and Cecil Taylor, among others. AllMusic biographer Chris Kelsey wrote: "Few free-jazz drummers play with a tenth of Cyrille's grace and authority. His energy is unflagging, his power absolute, tempered only by an ever-present sense of propriety."

== Life and career ==
Cyrille was born in Brooklyn, New York, United States, into a Haitian family. He began studying science at St. John's University, but was already playing jazz in the evenings and switched his studies to the Juilliard School. His first drum teachers were fellow Brooklyn-based drummers Willie Jones and Lenny McBrowne; through them, Cyrille met Max Roach. Nonetheless, Cyrille became a disciple of Philly Joe Jones.

His first professional engagement was as an accompanist of singer Nellie Lutcher, and he had an early recording session with Coleman Hawkins. Trumpeter Ted Curson introduced him to pianist Cecil Taylor when Cyrille was 18.

He joined the Cecil Taylor unit in 1965, and worked with Taylor over a period of 15 years. He later formed a musical partnership with Milford Graves, and the two recorded a drum duet album in 1974. In addition to recording as a bandleader, he has recorded and/or performed with musicians including David Murray, Irène Schweizer, Marilyn Crispell, Carla Bley, Butch Morris and Reggie Workman. Cyrille was a member of the group Trio 3, with Oliver Lake and Reggie Workman.

== Discography ==
=== As leader or co-leader ===
- What About? (BYG Actuel, 1969)
- Dialogue of the Drums (IPS, 1974) with Milford Graves
- Celebration (IPS, 1975) - with Alphonse Cimber, Ted Daniel, Romulus Franceschini, Stafford James, Jeanne Lee, Elouise Loftin, Donald Smith, David S. Ware
- Junction (Whynot, 1976) with Ted Daniel, David S. Ware, Lisle Atkinson
- The Loop (Ictus, 1978)
- Metamusicians' Stomp (Black Saint, 1978) with Ted Daniel, David S. Ware, Nick DiGeronimo
- Nuba (Black Saint, 1979) with Jeanne Lee, Jimmy Lyons
- Special People (Soul Note, 1980) with Ted Daniel, David S. Ware, Nick DiGeronimo
- The Navigator (Soul Note, 1982) with Ted Daniel, Sonelius Smith, Nick DiGeronimo
- Andrew Cyrille Meets Brötzmann in Berlin (FMP, 1983)
- Something in Return (Black Saint, 1988) with Jimmy Lyons
- Irène Schweizer & Andrew Cyrille (Intakt, 1989)
- Burnt Offering (Black Saint, 1991) with Jimmy Lyons
- Galaxies (Music & Arts, 1991) with Vladimir Tarasov
- My Friend Louis (DIW/Columbia, 1992) with Adegoke Steve Colson, Oliver Lake, Hannibal Lokumbe, Reggie Workman
- X Man (Soul Note, 1993) with James Newton, Anthony Cox
- Ode to the Living Tree (Venus, 1995) with Adegoke Steve Colson, Fred Hopkins, Oliver Lake, David Murray, Mor Thiam
- Good to Go, with a Tribute to Bu (Soul Note, 1997) with James Newton, Lisle Atkinson
- Double Clutch (Silkheart, 1997) with Richard Teitelbaum
- Duo Palindrome 2002 Vols. 1 and 2 (Intakt, 2004) with Anthony Braxton
- Low Blue Flame (TUM, 2006) with Greg Osby
- Opus de Life (Porter, 2009) with Paul Dunmall and Henry Grimes
- Route de Frères (TUM, 2011) with Haitian Fascination (Lisle Atkinson, Frisner Augustin, Hamiet Bluiett, Alix Pascal)
- The Declaration of Musical Independence (ECM, 2016) with Bill Frisell, Ben Street, Richard Teitelbaum
- Proximity (Sunnyside, 2016) with Bill McHenry
- Lebroba (ECM, 2018) with Bill Frisell, Wadada Leo Smith
- The News (ECM, 2021) with Bill Frisell, Ben Street, David Virelles
- 2 Blues for Cecil (Tum Records, 2022) with William Parker and Enrico Rava
- Evocation with Elliott Sharp and Richard Teitelbaum (Infrequent Seams, 2022)
- Music Delivery/Percussion (Intakt, 2023)

=== With Trio 3 ===
- Live in Willisau (Dizim, 1997)
- Encounter (Passin' Thru, 2000)
- Open Ideas (Palmetto, 2002)
- Time Being (Intakt, 2006)
- Wha's Nine: Live at the Sunset (Marge, 2008)
- Berne Concert with Irene Schweizer (Intakt, 2009)
- At This Time with Geri Allen (Intakt, 2009)
- Celebrating Mary Lou Williams–Live at Birdland New York with Geri Allen (Intakt, 2011)
- Refraction – Breakin' Glass with Jason Moran (Intakt, 2013)
- Wiring with Vijay Iyer (Intakt, 2014)
- Visiting Texture (Intakt, 2017)

=== As sideman ===
With Muhal Richard Abrams

- Mama and Daddy (Black Saint, 1980)
- Blues Forever (Black Saint, 1982) – recorded in 1981
- Rejoicing with the Light (Black Saint, 1983)
- Colors in Thirty-Third (Black Saint, 1987) – recorded in 1986
- The Hearinga Suite (Black Saint, 1989)

With Ahmed Abdul-Malik

- The Music of Ahmed Abdul-Malik (New Jazz, 1961)
- Sounds of Africa (New Jazz, 1961)

With Charles Brackeen

- Attainment (Silkheart, 1988) – recorded in 1987
- Worshippers Come Nigh (Silkheart, 1988) – recorded in 1987

With John Carter

- Castles of Ghana (Gramavision, 1985)
- Dance of the Love Ghosts (Gramavision, 1986)
- Fields (Gramavision, 1988)
- Comin' On (hat Art, 1988)
- Shadows on a Wall (Gramavision, 1989)

With Walt Dickerson

- This Is Walt Dickerson! (New Jazz, 1961)
- Relativity (New Jazz, 1962)
- To My Queen (New Jazz, 1963) – recorded in 1962
- Jazz Impressions of Lawrence of Arabia (Dauntless, 1963)
- Walt Dickerson Plays Unity (Audio Fidelity, 1964)
- Tell Us Only the Beautiful Things (Whynot, 1975)
- Peace (SteepleChase,1976)
- Life Rays (Soul Note, 1982)

With David Haney

- Clandestine (CIMP, 2008)
- Conspiracy A Go Go (CIMP, 2008)
- Siege of Misrata (CIMP, 2018)

With Leroy Jenkins

- The Legend of Ai Glatson (Black Saint, 1978)
- Space Minds, New Worlds, Survival of America (Tomato, 1979)

With Peter Kowald

- Duos: Europa-America-Japan (FMP, 1991) one track
- Duos 2: Europa-America-Japan (FMP, 2003) one track

With Oliver Lake

- Otherside (Gramavision, 1988)
- Edge-ing (Black Saint, 1993)

With Grachan Moncur III

- New Africa (BYG Actuel, 1969)
- Exploration (Capri, 2004)

With David Murray

- 3D Family (Hat Hut, 1978)
- David Murray/James Newton Quintet (DIW, 1991)
- Shakill's Warrior (DIW, 1991)
- Jazzosaurus Rex (Red Baron Records, 1993)
- Acoustic Octfunk (Sound Hills, 1993)
- Saxmen (Red Baron Records, 1993)
- Sacred Ground (Justin Time, 2007)
- Like a Kiss that Never Ends (Justin Time, 2001)

With Horace Tapscott

- The Dark Tree (hat Art, 1989)
- Aiee! The Phantom (Arabesque, 1996)

With Cecil Taylor

- Unit Structures (Blue Note, 1966)
- Conquistador! (Blue Note, 1968) – recorded in 1966
- Student Studies (BYG Actuel, 1973) – recorded in 1966
- The Great Concert of Cecil Taylor (Prestige, 1977) – live recorded in 1969. originally released as Nuits de la Fondation Maeght Vols. 1-3.
- Cecil Taylor Quartet in Europe (Jazz Connoisseur, 1969)
- Live in Stuttgart (Bootleg / Unauthorized, 1966/1969)
- Akisakila (Trio (Japan), 1973)
- Spring of Two Blue J's (Unit Core, 1973)
- Incarnation (FMP, 1999)
- Mixed to Unit Structures Revisited (compilation) (ezz-thetics, 2021)
- The Complete, Legendary, Live Return Concert (Oblivion, 2022)

With Mal Waldron

- Birthday Concert: Antwerp 1997 (Bootleg / Unauthorized, 1997)
- Soul Eyes (BMG, 1997)
- Live at North Sea Jazz Festival, The Hague (Bootleg / Unauthorized, 2001)

With others

- Geri Allen, The Printmakers (Minor Music, 1985)
- Billy Bang, A Tribute to Stuff Smith (Soul Note, 1992)
- Bill Barron, Hot Line (Savoy, 1962 [1964])
- Borah Bergman, The Human Factor (Soul Note, 1992)
- Borah Bergman and Peter Brötzmann, Exhilaration (Soul Note, 1997)
- Carla Bley, European Tour 1977 (ECM, 1978)
- Jean-Paul Bourelly, Jungle Cowboy (JMT, 1987)
- Anthony Braxton, Eight (+3) Tristano Compositions, 1989: For Warne Marsh (hatArt, 1989)
- Marion Brown, Afternoon of a Georgia Faun (ECM, 1970)
- Dave Burrell, Daybreak (Gazell, 1989)
- Kenny Burrell and Coleman Hawkins, Moonglow (Compilation; Prestige, 1981)
- Kenny Clarke, Milford Graves, and Famoudou Don Moye, Pieces of Time (Soul Note, 1984)
- Richard Davis, Total Package (Marge, 1997)
- Dave Douglas, Metamorphosis (Greenleaf Music, 2017)
- Dave Douglas and Uri Caine, Devotion (Greenleaf Music, 2019)
- Duology - Ted Daniel & Michael Marcus (Jazzwerkstatt 123, 2011)
- Marty Ehrlich, Side By Side (Enja Records, 1991)
- Karl Evangelista, Ngayon (Astral Spirits, 2023)
- Bill Frisell and Kit Downes, Breaking the Shell (Red Hook Records, 2024)
- Dennis González, The Earth and the Heart (Konnex, 1989)
- John Gordon, Step by Step (Strata-East, 1976)
- John Greaves, Peter Blegvad, and Lisa Herman, Kew. Rhone. (Virgin, 1977)
- The Group (Ahmed Abdullah, Marion Brown, Billy Bang, Sirone, Fred Hopkins, Cyrille), Live (NoBusiness Records, 2012)
- Charlie Haden, Liberation Music Orchestra (Impulse, 1969)
- Kip Hanrahan, Tenderness (American Clave, 1990)
- Coleman Hawkins, The Hawk Relaxes (Moodsville, 1961)
- Jazz Composer's Orchestra, The Jazz Composer's Orchestra (ECM, 1968)
- John Lindberg, A Tree Frog Tonality (Between the lines, 2000)
- Jimmy Lyons, Other Afternoons (BYG, 1969)
- Bill McHenry, La peur du vide (Sunnyside, 2012)
- Bill McHenry and Henry Grimes (as "Us Free"), Fish Stories (Fresh Sound, 2014)
- Ben Monder, Amorphae (ECM, 2016) – recorded in 2013
- Butch Morris, Dust To Dust (New World, 1991)
- Qasim Naqvi, Wadada Leo Smith, Two Centuries (Red Hook Records, 2022)
- Ivo Perelman, Children of Ibeji (Enja, 1991)
- Hugh Ragin, An Afternoon in Harlem (Justin Time, 1999)
- Eric Revis, City of Asylum (Clean Feed, 2013)
- Archie Shepp and Roswell Rudd, Live in New York (Verve, 2001) – live recorded in 2000
- Lonnie Liston Smith, Cosmic Funk (Flying Dutchman, 1974)
- John Tchicai and Reggie Workman, Witch's Scream (TUM, 2006)
- Bob Thiele Collective, Sunrise Sunset (Red Baron Records, 1990)
- Reggie Workman, Synthesis (Leo, 1986) – live
- Bambi Pang Pang, Drop Your Plans (Seppe Gebruers, Laurens Smet & Viktor Perdieus ) (eNR, 2015)
