= Encounter (Trio 3 album) =

Studio album by Trio 3
- Released: 2000
- Recorded: September 19, 1999
- Studio: Tedesco Studios, Paramus, New Jersey
- Genre: Jazz
- Length: 58:07
- Label: Passin' Thru

Trio 3 chronology
Live in Willisau (1997)	Encounter (2000)	Open Ideas (2002)

Encounter is an album by Trio 3, a jazz group consisting of saxophonist Oliver Lake, bassist Reggie Workman and drummer Andrew Cyrille. It was recorded in 1999 and released on Lake's own Passin' Thru label.

== Reception ==
Professional ratings
Review scores
Source	Rating
AllMusic	4.5/5 stars
Tom Hull – on the Web	A−

In his review for AllMusic, Alain Drouot states "This recording is one of the best testimonies to Cyrille's art as well as a major statement by three great and inspired musicians at the peak of their powers."

Gary Giddins wrote: "Oliver Lake, Andrew Cyrille, and Reggie Workman unite with a kind of loft-era thrift, and everything works—the energy level high, the effect sparkling yet controlled, and never a tossed-off moment. Lake's timbre is a saw with inch-long teeth and thoroughly fetching; I'd love to hear him commune with Lee Konitz."

== Track listing ==
1. "Crooked Blues" (Bobby Bradford) – 6:28
2. "Leaving East of Java" (Steve Colson) – 13:38
3. "Encounter" (John Carter) – 6:17
4. "Reminds Me" (Oliver Lake) – 4:51
5. "Ode to the Living Tree" (Andrew Cyrille) – 6:32
6. "Suite Tristan" (Reggie Workman) – 14:17
7. "Nicodemus" (Andrew Hill) – 6:04

== Personnel ==
- Oliver Lake – alto saxophone, soprano saxophone, flute
- Reggie Workman – bass
- Andrew Cyrille – drums
