= Again and Again (Oliver Lake album) =

Studio album by Oliver Lake
- Released: 1991
- Recorded: April 1991
- Studio: Clinton, New York City
- Genre: Jazz
- Length: 52:56
- Label: Gramavision
- Producer: Oliver Lake

Oliver Lake chronology
Otherside (1988)	Again and Again (1991)	Boston Duets (1992)

Again and Again is an album by the American jazz saxophonist Oliver Lake. It was recorded in 1991 and released on the Gramavision label. Lake composed eight ballads for a quartet with pianist John Hicks, bassist Reggie Workman and drummer Pheeroan akLaff.

== Reception ==
Professional ratings
Review scores
Source	Rating
AllMusic	4/5 stars
The Penguin Guide to Jazz	3.5/4 stars

The Washington Post wrote that "the album finds Lake in a mood of almost unbroken reflection, playing with a tart, yearning tone over the shimmering and often harmonically ambiguous backdrops."

In his review for AllMusic, Scott Yanow states: "Although none of these originals are destined to become standards, they inspire Lake to come up with some of his more lyrical solos." The Penguin Guide to Jazz notes: "Again and Again offers an uncommonly lyrical and mainstream performance from Lake. Only 'Aztec' and 'Re-cre-ate' approach the angularity one normally expects of his soloing."

== Track listing ==
All compositions by Oliver Lake

1. "Again and Again" – 7:15
2. "Anyway" – 7:17
3. "Cross River" – 4:13
4. "Touch" – 8:27
5. "Aztec" – 6:00
6. "Mask" – 8:04
7. "Re-cre-ate" – 4:25
8. "M.I.L.D." – 7:15

== Personnel ==
- Oliver Lake - alto sax, soprano sax
- John Hicks – piano
- Reggie Workman – bass
- Pheeroan akLaff – drums
