= Dedicated to Dolphy =

Studio album by Oliver Lake
- Released: 1996
- Recorded: November 1, 2 and 8, 1994
- Genre: Jazz
- Length: 54:44
- Label: Black Saint
- Producer: Flavio Bonandrini

Oliver Lake chronology
Edge-ing (1994)	Dedicated to Dolphy (1996)	Live in Willisau (1997)

Dedicated to Dolphy is an album by the American jazz saxophonist Oliver Lake, recorded in 1994 for the Italian Black Saint label. The album is Lake's second tribute to multi-instrumentalist Eric Dolphy, following Prophet (1984).

== Reception ==
The AllMusic review by Ken Dryden described the album as "an excellent salute to Dolphy with a couple of strong Lake originals thrown in for good measure".

Professional ratings
Review scores
Source	Rating
AllMusic	4/5 stars
The Penguin Guide to Jazz Recordings	3/4 stars

== Track listing ==
All compositions by Eric Dolphy, except as indicated

1. "Fire Waltz" (Mal Waldron) - 7:04
2. "Hat and Beard" - 4:10
3. "Feather" (Hale Smith) - 5:49
4. "245" - 8:19
5. "Miss Ann" - 6:21
6. "Something Sweet, Something Tender" - 5:39
7. "November '80" (Oliver Lake) - 2:18
8. "Page Four" (Lake) - 6:34
9. "G.W." - 8:30
  - Recorded at East Side Sound in New York City on November 1, 2 and 8, 1994

== Personnel ==
- Oliver Lake - alto saxophone
- Russel Gunn - trumpet
- Charles Eubanks - piano
- Belden Bullock - bass
- Cecil Brooks III- drums
