= Altered Spaces =

Live album by Reggie Workman
- Released: 1993
- Recorded: February 1992
- Venue: Swarthmore College, Swarthmore, Pennsylvania
- Genre: Jazz
- Length: 1:17:52
- Label: Leo Records; LR 183
- Producer: Leo Feigin; Reggie Workman

Reggie Workman chronology
Images (1989)	Altered Spaces (1993)	Summit Conference (1994)

Altered Spaces is a live album by bassist/composer Reggie Workman. It was recorded in February 1992 at Swarthmore College in Swarthmore, Pennsylvania, and was released by Leo Records in 1993. On the album, Workman is joined by vocalist Jeanne Lee, clarinetist Don Byron, violinist Jason Hwang, pianist Marilyn Crispell, and drummer Gerry Hemingway.

== Reception ==
Professional ratings
Review scores
Source	Rating
AllMusic	3/5 stars
The Penguin Guide to Jazz	3.5/4 stars

The authors of the Penguin Guide to Jazz Recordings awarded the album 3½ stars, and commented: "Altered Spaces is the most ambitious work the Ensemble has tackled... Impressive... for its sheer cross-grainedness."

Writing for AllMusic, Don Snowden remarked: "this is very much in the chamber jazz zone, closer to the European avant-classical wing than any rhythm-driven freedom pulse variant... It's challenging stuff with lovely moments, for sure, and probably made for an absorbing ride in concert, but as a pure listening experience, the ebb and flow is a bit too dry and severe to fully make the transition to disc. Altered Spaces is fine for advanced Reggie Workman fans, but tough for beginners who can find more accessible discs for an introduction to his music as a leader."

== Track listing ==
All compositions by Reggie Workman.

1. "Apart (Revisited)" - 27:07
2. "Ballad For The Silf" - 6:33
3. "Altered Spaces" - 8:02
4. "Ten" - 12:48
5. "Suite Pour Le Courage" - 19:21
6. "Wha's Nine" - 3:43

== Personnel ==
- Reggie Workman – bass
- Jeanne Lee – voice
- Don Byron – clarinet
- Jason Hwang – violin
- Marilyn Crispell – piano
- Gerry Hemingway – drums

== Production ==
- Leo Feigin, Reggie Workman – producers
- John Rosenberg – recording engineer
