= 2 Blues for Cecil =

Studio album by Andrew Cyrille, William Parker, and Enrico Rava
- Released: January 21, 2022
- Recorded: February 1-2, 2021
- Studio: Studios Ferber, Paris, France
- Genre: Jazz
- Label: TUM Records; TUM CD 059
- Producer: Petri Haussila

Andrew Cyrille chronology
The News (2021)	2 Blues for Cecil (2022)	Evocation (2022)

2 Blues for Cecil is an album by drummer Andrew Cyrille, bassist William Parker, and trumpeter Enrico Rava. It was recorded in February 2021 at Studios Ferber in Paris, France, and was released by TUM Records on January 21, 2022. The album is a tribute to pianist Cecil Taylor, with whom all three musicians played; despite this, it does not feature a piano, and does not "attempt to reanimate or imitate Cecil Taylor's style of playing."

== Reception ==
Professional ratings
Review scores
Source	Rating
AllMusic	4/5 stars
DownBeat	3.5/5 stars
All About Jazz #1	4.5/5 stars
All About Jazz #2	4/5 stars
PopMatters	7/10 stars
Tom Hull – on the Web	A−

In a review for AllMusic, Thom Jurek wrote: "This group's innate, perhaps even cellular understanding of Taylor's theories are illustrated colorfully and energetically, without attempting to match the pianist's fluid intensity... This trio may not attempt to imitate Taylor's approach, but they do reveal the intricate dimensions in his aesthetic, while simultaneously reflecting and celebrating the long reach of his influence."

DownBeat's Ivana Ng praised the "liberatory improvisation and uninhibited expression between the three established musicians," and stated that they "have had decades-long careers in free-jazz, and it is this very collective creativity that expands our understanding of the genre."

Writing for All About Jazz, Dan McClenaghan commented: "This trio does not try to match the scattershot, free flying wildness of Taylor. Their approach is a measured and spacious thing. Where Taylor sent piano notes and the collective cacophonies of his bands colliding off the quasars in the furthest reaches of the galaxy, Cyrille, Parker and Rava have found a closer star and set up a steady orbit."

In a separate AAJ review, Karl Ackermann stated: "There is a native talent that comes with being top-tier members of the elite old guard of avant-garde and free jazz. For all their collective experiences and influences, Cyrille, Parker, and Rava are beholding to no particular inspiration. Their invoking of Taylor is simply an acclamation of the unprecedented spirit of his creativity. They summon Taylor's essence and do so stunningly, without going quite as far into the unknown as Taylor would likely have ventured. 2 Blues For Cecil offers a metaphorical calm within the storm that embodied the pianist."

John Garratt, writing for PopMatters, remarked: "it's strange to end 2 Blues for Cecil with a standard, let alone one as old as 'My Funny Valentine'. But similar to Miles Davis' reading of the same tune, this one won't cause you to jump out of your chair and shout 'Show tune!' The trio of Cyrille, Parker, and Rava give it the same bluesy treatment as the previously mentioned improvisations. And if you think Taylor himself wouldn't have approved of such a coda, Parker disagrees. 'He was not avant-garde; he was a human being who loves life and music,' he states in the liner notes. 'He would not be boxed in by the music world's value system that asks artists to conform to their standards.' By that yardstick, Cecil should be smiling right about now."

Glide Magazine's Jim Hynes commented: "Using the principles of space and the notion of 'Sing' - not focusing directly on pitch, dynamics, or rhythm but fusing these dimensions, along with tone, texture, and spirit into an energy flow is the essence of this trio's approach. It's what they learned from Taylor. Within lies some awe-inspiring performances but some beautiful moments too... Some fans of avant-garde or free jazz even find Cecil Taylor's music a bit inaccessible, let alone the mainstream crowd. Don't let that be a deterrent here. Cyrille, Parker, and Rava deliver beautifully executed music that is enthralling throughout."

In an article for WBGO Afternoon Jazz, Nate Chinen wrote: "All three improvisers spent important stretches playing with Taylor, though at different times. And their approach with this putative tribute is less about emulation than acknowledgment; they're honoring a common touchstone by being most fully themselves. The album includes some blues and ballads... — and a bristling take on 'Ballerina,' which Rava composed more than 30 years ago. Listen to the way these musicians effervesce through the tune, and the Cecil connection should be clear."

A review by Michael Ullman in The Arts Fuse stated: "The trio shares Taylor's love of rational freedom and adventure, but it doesn't try to reproduce the pianist's rip-roaring intensity. 2 Blues for Cecil is a genial set, its silences as intriguing as its flurries of notes. There are a number of lovely improvised melodies — sprightly, clever, and even transparent interactions... the players are independent, out of the box. Yet they also sound beautifully together."

Writing for The Big Takeover, Michael Toland remarked: "each player knows that emulating Taylor's style is not the way to pay proper tribute to his spirit. Taylor's art encouraged others to channel their own unfiltered vision, rather than attempt to copy him, and it's a notion embraced by his former bandmates. That's not to say that Cyrille, Parker and Rava don't indulge in free improv – of course they do. But there's nothing here that sounds like Unit Structures or Nefertiti, The Beautiful One Has Come. (Note the lack of piano.)... Taylor celebrated the creative impulse by eschewing any barriers on how it could be expressed. While not nearly as boundary-obliterating as Taylor himself – who could be, after all? – Cyrille, Parker and Rava nonetheless stay true to that ideal, letting their own instincts guide the music to an uncommon sphere all their own."

== Track listing ==
1. "Improvisation No. 1" (Cyrille, Rava, Parker) – 10:55
2. "Ballerina" (Rava) – 6:32
3. "Blues For Cecil No. 1" (Cyrille, Rava, Parker) – 10:09
4. "Improvisation No. 2" (Cyrille, Rava, Parker) – 6:28
5. "Top, Bottom And What's In The Middle" (Cyrille) – 7:18
6. "Blues For Cecil No. 2" (Cyrille, Rava, Parker) – 8:42
7. "Enrava Melody" (Cyrille) – 5:32
8. "Overboard" (Rava) – 5:49
9. "Machu Picchu" (Parker) – 5:40
10. "My Funny Valentine" (Richard Rodgers) – 3:10

== Personnel ==
- Andrew Cyrille – drums
- William Parker – bass
- Enrico Rava – flugelhorn
