= Visiting Texture =

Studio album by Trio 3
- Released: 2017
- Recorded: July 21 and 22, 2016
- Venue: Studio Peter Karl, Brooklyn, New York
- Genre: Free jazz
- Label: Intakt Records; CD 282
- Producer: Intakt Records, Patrik Landolt, Rosmarie A. Meier

Trio 3 chronology
Wiring (2014)	Visiting Texture (2017)

Visiting Texture is an album by Trio 3, a jazz group consisting of saxophonist Oliver Lake, bassist Reggie Workman and drummer Andrew Cyrille. It was recorded at Studio Peter Karl in Brooklyn, New York in July 2016, and was released in 2017 by Intakt Records.

== Reception ==
Professional ratings
Review scores
Source	Rating
All About Jazz	5/5 stars
Tom Hull – on the Web	A−

In a review for All About Jazz, John Sharpe called the album a "splendid outing," and wrote: "Looking back, you can see the attraction of having a pianist exploit pockets of space in the overall fabric, but by keeping intact the ambiguity such spaciousness confers, the rewards are even greater. So much so that it's difficult to pick out the single collective piece from the six compositions contributed by individual band members. That's because often they merely sketch out the written material, which gives a delicious feel of hidden structure without revealing too much of how it's achieved."

Derek Taylor, writing for Dusted Magazine, stated: "As accommodating as the three players are to collaborators, a back-to-basics approach centering on their core association serves them well here."

== Track listing ==
1. "Bumpe" (Lake) – 5:40
2. "Bonu" (Lake) – 6:08
3. "Composite" (Cyrille/Lake/Workman) – 6:40
4. "Epic Man" (Cyrille) – 7:47
5. "Stick" (Lake) – 4:56
6. "A Girl Named Rainbow" (Ornette Coleman) – 7:00
7. "7 for Max" (Cyrille) – 2:52
8. "Visiting Texture" (Workman) – 10:42

== Personnel ==
- Oliver Lake – alto saxophone
- Reggie Workman – bass
- Andrew Cyrille – drums
