= X Man (album) =

Studio album by Andrew Cyrille
- Released: 1994
- Recorded: May 8 and 9, 1993
- Studio: Sear Sound, New York City
- Genre: jazz
- Label: Soul Note; 121262-2
- Producer: Flavio Bonandrini

Andrew Cyrille chronology
My Friend Louis (1992)	X Man (1994)	Ode to the Living Tree (1995)

X Man is an album by drummer Andrew Cyrille. It was recorded in May 1993 at Sear Sound in New York City, and was released by Soul Note in 1994. On the album, Cyrille is joined by flutist James Newton, guitarist Alix Pascal, and bassist Anthony Cox.

== Reception ==
Professional ratings
Review scores
Source	Rating
AllMusic	4/5 stars
The Penguin Guide to Jazz	3.5/4 stars
The Rolling Stone Jazz & Blues Album Guide	4.5/5 stars
Tom Hull – on the Web	B

In a review for AllMusic, Scott Yanow wrote: "Considering the musicians who are involved, it is often surprising how gentle and melodic this music is. Guitarist Alix Pascal is a new voice with a quiet sound, while flutist James Newton, bassist Anthony Cox, and drummer Andrew Cyrille have long been known for their versatility, open-minded approach to improvising, and high musicianship. Each player contributed two songs apiece, and the soloing is pretty democratic, with each musician having their opportunity to shine both as a soloist and in the ensembles. This is a subtle set that grows more interesting with each listen."

The authors of The Penguin Guide to Jazz awarded the album 3½ stars, and commented: "Flute and guitar add a new spectrum to X Man, one that seems closer to Cyrille's basic understanding of melody. Newton's 'E-Squat' is a strong, clearly stated idea from a player who seems to understand Cyrille's intentions from the bottom up, and the drummer responds with some of his simplest and least cluttered playing on record. 'Simple Melody' is extraordinary, something out of a far-off place that yet seems as familiar and immediate as the most overworked standard."

== Track listing ==
1. "Answer Me" (Pascal) – 6:09
2. "Novo" (Cox) – 5:46
3. "A Simple Melody" (Cyrille) – 5:03
4. "E - Squat" (Newton) – 5:44
5. "5:05" (Cox) – 17:29
6. "Lydia" (Pascal) – 7:02
7. "X Man" (Newton) – 9:40
8. "Akan" (Cyrille) – 4:07

== Personnel ==
- Andrew Cyrille – drums
- James Newton – flute
- Alix Pascal – guitar (tracks 1, 3, 6, and 8)
- Anthony Cox – bass
