= My Friend Louis =

Studio album by Andrew Cyrille
- Released: 1992
- Recorded: November 18 and 19, 1991
- Studio: Power Station, New York City
- Genre: jazz
- Label: DIW Records; DIW-858
- Producer: Kazunori Sugiyama

Andrew Cyrille chronology
Galaxies (1991)	My Friend Louis (1992)	X Man (1994)

My Friend Louis is an album by drummer Andrew Cyrille. It was recorded in November 1991 at Power Station in New York City, and was released by DIW Records in 1992. On the album, Cyrille is joined by saxophonist Oliver Lake, trumpeter Hannibal, pianist Adegoke Steve Colson, and bassist Reggie Workman. "Louis" refers to drummer Louis Moholo, to whom the album is dedicated.

== Reception ==
Professional ratings
Review scores
Source	Rating
AllMusic	4/5 stars
Tom Hull – on the Web	B+
The Penguin Guide to Jazz	3/4 stars

In a review for AllMusic, Ron Wynn wrote: "Fiery, rampaging session with drummer Andrew Cyrille anchoring a stirring set featuring the dynamic Oliver Lake on alto and soprano saxophone. This is uncompromising, exciting material, far from sedate standards or derivative hard bop recitations."

The authors of the Penguin Guide to Jazz Recordings wrote: "My Friend Louis is dedicated to the South African Louis Moholo and explores a shared pool of atavistic dialects, free jazz confronting the most basic communicative rhythms... Workman is his usual cavernous self, and the recording is as full and intense as anyone might wish."

== Track listing ==
1. "Soul Brother (Dedicated To Malcolm X)" (Lokumbe) – 9:25
2. "South Of The Border Serenade" (Colson) – 6:43
3. "The Prophet" (Eric Dolphy) – 6:32
4. "Shell" (Cyrille) – 8:35
5. "Kiss On The Bridge" (Lokumbe) – 8:01
6. "Tap Dancer" (Lake) – 5:55
7. "Where's Nine" (Workman) – 3:34
8. "My Friend Louis (Dedicated To Louis Moholo)" (Cyrille) – 14:02

== Personnel ==
- Andrew Cyrille – drums
- Oliver Lake – alto saxophone, soprano saxophone
- Hannibal – trumpet
- Adegoke Steve Colson – piano
- Reggie Workman – bass
