= Maya Milenovic Workman =

Slovene choreographer (born 1959)

- Born: 1959 (age 66–67); Maribor, Slovenia, Yugoslavia
- Education: London Contemporary Dance School; The New School
- Occupations: Choreographer; educator; filmmaker
- Spouse: Reggie Workman (m. 1977)
- Children: 1
- Awards: Guggenheim Fellowship (2020)

Maya Milenovic Workman (born 1959) is a Slovenian choreographer, educator, and filmmaker based in the United States. A 2020 Guggenheim Fellow, she has worked as artistic director of the Montclair Academy of Dance and Laboratory of Music (MADLOM), which she and her husband Reggie Workman co-founded.

== Biography ==
Maya Milenovic was born in 1959 in Maribor. She went to the London Contemporary Dance School; the Merce Cunningham Dance Studio, where she worked with Cunningham, Ruth Barnes, Chris Komar, and Robert Kovich; and The New School, where she got a Master of Arts degree. In 1977, she met jazz musician Reggie Workman while in Italy; they married in 1985, and they have one daughter.

In a review of Christopher Bannerman's 1985 production "Shadows in the Sun", Jann Parry of The Observer said that Milenovich's "strongly-curving choreography, with its abrupt changes of direction and marked rhythms, was more interesting than the music." In 2011, her production I Hear With My Eyes, which she dedicated to her deaf brother, made its premiere at the Maribor Slovene National Theatre. She later produced another special needs-themed production, Guernic 2012, funded by the city of Maribor and the Ministry of Culture.

In 1999, she was hired as dance coordinator at the Montclair State University Preparatory Center for the Arts. She and Reggie co-founded the Montclair Academy of Dance and Laboratory of Music, where she has also served as artistic director.

In addition to several collaborations with her MADLOM students, she directed the 2009 documentary Perfect Blend. She wrote and produced Outcry, a 2020 documentary on her husband.

By 1999, she had won the Slovenian Ministry of Culture Choreography Fellowship Award four times. In 2020, she was awarded a Guggenheim Fellowship in Music Composition.

She and Reggie separated in 2005 but have still remained creative partners.
