= Boston Duets =

Live album by Oliver Lake & Donal Fox
- Released: 1992
- Recorded: August 14, 1989
- Venues: Regattabar, Cambridge, Massachusetts
- Genre: Jazz
- Length: 67:38
- Label: Music & Arts
- Producer: Oliver Lake

Oliver Lake chronology
Again and Again (1991)	Boston Duets (1992)	Virtual Reality (Total Escapism) (1992)

Boston Duets is an album by American jazz saxophonist Oliver Lake and pianist Donal Fox, which was recorded live in 1989 and released on the Music & Arts label.

== Reception ==
Professional ratings
Review scores
Source	Rating
AllMusic	4/5 stars
The Penguin Guide to Jazz	3.5/4 stars

In his review for AllMusic, Thom Jurek states "What is happening on the bandstand between these two is extemporaneous composition and deep listening."

The Penguin Guide to Jazz notes "The pianist is a restless and highly intelligent improviser who also works in more formal structures, and it's easy to hear why the two men found the partnership congenial."

== Track listing ==
1. "Comous" (Lake) – 8:04
2. "Seque Blues" (Fox, Lake) – 10:13
3. "Sarah" (Lake) – 2:41
4. "Suite in Three Movements" (Fox) – 14:53
5. "Intermezzo" (Fox) – 2:30
6. "Variants on a Theme by Monk" (Fox) – 7:13
7. "Ballad" (Lake) – 3:19
8. "No V.T." (Lake) – 11:43
9. "Rhythm-a-Ning" (Thelonious Monk) – 6:54

== Personnel ==
- Oliver Lake - alto saxophone, soprano saxophone, flute
- Donal Fox – piano
