= Celebrating Mary Lou Williams–Live at Birdland New York =

Live album by Trio 3 + Geri Allen
- Released: 2011
- Recorded: August 19 and 21, 2010
- Venue: Birdland, New York City
- Genre: Free jazz
- Label: Intakt Records; CD 187
- Producer: Patrik Landolt

Trio 3 chronology
At This Time (2009)	Celebrating Mary Lou Williams–Live at Birdland New York (2011)	Refraction – Breakin' Glass (2013)

Celebrating Mary Lou Williams–Live at Birdland New York is a live album by Trio 3, a jazz group consisting of saxophonist Oliver Lake, bassist Reggie Workman and drummer Andrew Cyrille. It was recorded at Birdland in New York City in August 2010, and was released in 2011 by Intakt Records. On the album, which consists solely of compositions by Mary Lou Williams, the musicians are joined by pianist Geri Allen.

== Reception ==
Professional ratings
Review scores
Source	Rating
DownBeat	4/5 stars
All About Jazz	4/5 stars
Tom Hull – on the Web	A−

Writing for DownBeat, Alain Drouot stated: "on this... occasion the quartet realizes the full extent of its potential. Not only do they pay tribute to [Williams's] music, they also embody her spirit... Allen really shines and confirms that she is currently going through one of the most creative periods of her career... this live date... underlines... how modern and relevant the music of Mary Lou Williams was and still is."

In a review for All About Jazz, Glenn Astarita wrote: "These modern jazz VIPs render a synchronized attack that incites a harmonious mélange of mainstream, progressive, and free-jazz during this homage to legendary pianist, composer and arranger Mary Lou Williams. One of the mainstays and redeeming traits of this live program relates to the musicians' inimitable styles amid their technical faculties and keen interpretative powers... these crafty musicians inject several nooks and crannies into the mix, their distinct voices elevating the core concept of this project, amid their shrewd plan of attack, to a higher realm."

Bill Shoemaker, writing for Point of Departure, commented: "Celebrating Mary Lou Williams is one of the better recordings of 2011 and is among the very best tribute albums of the past several years. Expect it to place fairly high on year-end best-of lists."

In a review for Jazzwise, Kevin Le Gendre stated: " The gig highlights the warm, leisurely, almost airborne quality of some of Williams' themes, several of which have subtle gospel implications that make for an almost sophisticated spiritual in places. Lake is in particularly good form and his considerable variations of attack and timbre, from the evanescent and airy to the urgent and piercing, serve the range of moods well."

== Track listing ==
All compositions by Mary Lou Williams.

1. "Introduction by Gianni Valenti, Birdland" – 0:31
2. "Blues for Peter" – 9:57
3. "Ghost of Love" – 10:25
4. "New Musical Express" – 13:40
5. "Intermission" – 8:41
6. "What's Your Story, Morning Glory" – 8:24
7. "Libra" – 2:54
8. "Roll'Em" – 12:46

== Personnel ==
- Oliver Lake – alto saxophone
- Reggie Workman – bass
- Andrew Cyrille – drums
- Geri Allen – piano
