= Wiring (album) =

Studio album by Trio 3 + Vijay Iyer
- Released: 2014
- Recorded: August 14–15, 2013
- Studio: Sear Sound, New York City
- Genre: Jazz
- Length: 69:55
- Label: Intakt

Trio 3 chronology
Refraction – Breakin' Glass (2013)	Wiring (2014)	Visiting Texture (2017)

Wiring is an album by Trio 3, a jazz group consisting of saxophonist Oliver Lake, bassist Reggie Workman and drummer Andrew Cyrille, with guest pianist Vijay Iyer. It was recorded in 2013 and released by Intakt Records.

== Background ==
In the summer of 2013 Lake, Workman, Cyrille invited Vijay Iyer for a week long residency in New York's Jazzclub Birdland, before they recorded this album. Iyer was the fourth guest piano player cooperating with Trio 3 after Irène Schweizer, Geri Allen and Jason Moran.

== Reception ==
Professional ratings
Review scores
Source	Rating
Down Beat	4/5 stars
Tom Hull – on the Web	B+
All About Jazz	4/5 stars

The Down Beat review by Peter Margasak states "Iyer connects with the group in a substantive way; there’s nothing tentative or overly polite, even when they tackle Curtis Clark's soulful 'Chiara', a luminescent ballad stripped of any hollow sentiment."

The All About Jazz review John Sharpe notes "Iyer becomes an integral part of the outfit, whether stretching out simultaneously with the saxophonist, or comping energetically behind him."

In a review for Jazzwise, Kevin Le Gendre stated: "The Lake-Workman-Cyrille ensemble is proving to be a stellar contemporary supergroup, evolving periodically by way of the addition of a guest pianist... Iyer... proves to be an effective collaborator on a set that has the strength of character one would expect from such illustrious names."

Irwin Block, writing for Senior Times, commented: "This is fabulous work – music that grows with listening because of its broad palette and subtle impact. The music is well-constructed, the improv parts played with care and conviction."

In an article for The Telegraph, Ivan Hewett remarked: "As always with this trio, the blues is never far away, and the pull between that earthiness and the music’s freewheeling impulse is fascinating."

== Track listing ==
1. "The Prowl" (Vijay Iyer) – 6:42
2. "Synapse II " (Reggie Workman) – 8:09
3. "Willow Song" (Reggie Workman) – 8:00
4. "Shave" (Oliver Lake) – 7:01
5. "Rosmarie" (Lake-Workman-Cyrille-Iyer) – 6:39
6. "Suite for Trayvon (and Thousands More) I. Slimm" (Vijay Iyer) – 5:13
7. "Suite for Trayvon (and Thousands More) II. Fallacies" (Vijay Iyer) – 7:34
8. "Suite for Trayvon (and Thousands More) III. Adagio" (Vijay Iyer) – 4:15
9. "Wiring" (Oliver Lake) – 4:11
10. "Chiara" (Curtis Clark) – 7:42
11. "Tribute to Bu" (Andrew Cyrille) – 6:29

== Personnel ==
- Oliver Lake – alto saxophone
- Vijay Iyer – piano
- Reggie Workman – bass
- Andrew Cyrille – drums
