= Duo Palindrome 2002 =

Studio album by Andrew Cyrille and Anthony Braxton
- Released: 2004
- Recorded: October 26, 2002
- Studio: Wesleyan University, Middletown, Connecticut
- Genre: Free jazz
- Label: Intakt Records; CD 088/089
- Producer: Patrik Landolt

Andrew Cyrille chronology
Double Clutch (1997)	Duo Palindrome 2002 (2004)	Low Blue Flame (2006)

Volume Two cover

Duo Palindrome 2002, Volumes 1 and 2, is a pair of albums by drummer Andrew Cyrille and multi-instrumentalist Anthony Braxton. The albums were recorded in October 2002 at Wesleyan University in Middletown, Connecticut, and were released by Intakt Records in 2004.

Cyrille and Braxton first met in 1969 in Paris, where both musicians recorded albums for the BYG Actuel series. Cyrille, who was a member of the Cecil Taylor Unit at the time, recorded his solo percussion album What About? in August of that year, while Braxton, who was in France with Leo Smith and Leroy Jenkins, recorded his album Anthony Braxton in September. Cyrille later appeared on Braxton's 1990 album Eight (+3) Tristano Compositions, 1989: For Warne Marsh.

== Reception ==
Professional ratings
Review scores
Source	Rating
The Penguin Guide to Jazz	3/4 stars

In a review for All About Jazz, Rex Butters wrote: "Original compositions, spontaneous improvisations, and a couple of oldies provide the maps for these two fearless explorers. As one expects, they overwhelm any notion of 'reeds and drums,' ready to play interdimensional or romantic at the drop of a hidden cue... The veteran improvisers make the most of their delayed confrontation. Braxton and Cyrille share their decades of musical innovation with each other and fortunate listeners."

Jason Bivins, writing for One Final Note, called the albums "robust, intelligent, and filled with the very ease and warmth that so many haters have long professed absent from Mr. Braxton's music." He commented: "these performances are filled with surprise and familiarity, toughness and whimsy, focus and erring... it's confirmation that both Braxton and Cyrille are still playing fine, provocative music."

== Track listing ==
=== Volume 1 ===
1. "Duo Palindrome 2002" (Cyrille/Braxton) – 4:34
2. "The Loop" (Cyrille) – 5:39
3. "Interlacing" (Cyrille/Braxton) – 4:35
4. "Celestial Gravity" (Cyrille/Braxton) – 2:48
5. "Quickened Spirits" (Cyrille/Braxton) – 4:50
6. "Effluence" (Cyrille/Braxton) – 4:24
7. "Composition No. 310" (Braxton) – 11:46
8. "Ascendancy" (Cyrille/Braxton) – 11:36

=== Volume 2 ===
1. "Water, Water, Water" (Cyrille) – 5:28
2. "Dreams Alive ... Concretize" (Cyrille/Braxton) – 4:28
3. "Excerpt From The Navigator" (Cyrille) – 4:55
4. "Sound Relations" (Cyrille/Braxton) – 9:13
5. "Composition No 311" (Braxton) – 10:15
6. "Dr. Licks" (Cyrille) – 7:30
7. "A Musical Sense Of Life" (Braxton) – 6:50

== Personnel ==
- Andrew Cyrille – drums
- Anthony Braxton – reeds
