= Special People (album) =

Studio album by Andrew Cyrille
- Released: 1980
- Recorded: October 21 & 22, 1980
- Genre: Jazz
- Length: 36:55
- Label: Soul Note
- Producer: Giovanni Bonandrini

Andrew Cyrille chronology
Nuba (1979)	Special People (1980)	The Navigator (1982)

Special People is an album by American jazz drummer Andrew Cyrille, recorded in 1980 for the Italian Soul Note label.

== Reception ==
Professional ratings
Review scores
Source	Rating
AllMusic	3/5 stars
The Penguin Guide to Jazz Recordings	3/4 stars
The Rolling Stone Jazz Record Guide	3/5 stars
Tom Hull – on the Web	B+

The authors of The Penguin Guide to Jazz Recordings commented: "Pieces like 'High Priest'... represent a significant extension of 1960s radicalism into a more formal and tradition-aware context. In that regard, Daniel is an ideal collaborator."

== Track listing ==
All compositions by Andrew Cyrille, except where noted

1. "A Girl Named Rainbow" (Ornette Coleman) - 10:10
2. "High Priest" - 7:48
3. "Fortified Nucleolus" - 5:12
4. "Baby Man" (John Stubblefield) - 6:40
5. "Special People" - 7:05

- Recorded at Barigozzi Studio in Milano, Italy in October 21 & 22, 1980

== Personnel ==
- Andrew Cyrille - drums, percussion
- Ted Daniel - trumpet, flugelhorn
- David S. Ware - tenor saxophone
- Nick DiGeronimo - bass
