= Galaxies (album) =

Live album by Andrew Cyrille and Vladimir Tarasov
- Released: 1991
- Recorded: 1990
- Venue: Vancouver; Toronto; Oakland, California
- Genre: Jazz
- Label: Music & Arts; CD-672

Andrew Cyrille chronology
Burnt Offering (1991)	Galaxies (1991)	My Friend Louis (1992)

Galaxies is a live album by percussionists Andrew Cyrille and Vladimir Tarasov, recorded in 1990 at multiple concerts, and released in 1991 by Music & Arts.

== Reception ==
Professional ratings
Review scores
Source	Rating
AllMusic	2.5/5 stars
The Penguin Guide to Jazz	3.5/4 stars
The Rolling Stone Jazz & Blues Album Guide	3.5/5 stars

The authors of the Penguin Guide to Jazz Recordings awarded the album 3½ stars, and commented: "Galaxies is a dense, detailed album that may well tax the attention of listeners not entirely persuaded of the merits of solo percussion. It should, perhaps, be listened to track-by-track rather than as an uninterrupted whole."

In a review for AllMusic, Scott Yanow wrote: "This is definitely a recording for very specialized tastes... Although probably pretty impressive to see live, on record much of the musical magic is missing and there are not too many listeners that interested in hearing 56 minutes of drum solos."

== Track listing ==
1. "Galaxies & Action V" (Tarasov) – 26:14
2. "No. 11" (Cyrille) – 11:38
3. "Summit" (Tarasov) – 5:48
4. "One Up, One Down" (John Coltrane) – 2:19
- Tracks 1 and 2 recorded at the Vancouver International Jazz Festival, June 1990. Track 3 recorded at the 1990 Toronto Jazz Festival. Track 4 recorded at the Koncepts Gallery in Oakland, California in 1990.

== Personnel ==
- Andrew Cyrille – drums, percussion
- Vladimir Tarasov – drums, percussion
