= Images (Reggie Workman album) =

Live album by Reggie Workman
- Released: 1990
- Recorded: January and July 1989
- Venue: Knitting Factory, New York City
- Genre: Free Jazz
- Label: Music & Arts
- Producer: Reggie Workman

Reggie Workman chronology
Synthesis (1986)	Images (1990)	Altered Spaces (1993)

Images is a live album by bassist and composer Reggie Workman. It was recorded at the Knitting Factory in New York City in January and July 1989, and was released in 1990 by Music & Arts. On the album, Workman is joined by clarinetist Don Byron, vocalist Jeanne Lee, guitarist Michele Navazio, pianist Marilyn Crispell, and percussionist Gerry Hemingway.

The title of the track "Jus' Ole Mae (Revisited)" refers to the fact that "Jus' Ole Mae" appeared on Workman's previous album, Synthesis, released in 1986.

== Reception ==
Professional ratings
Review scores
Source	Rating
AllMusic	4/5 stars
The Penguin Guide to Jazz	3/4 stars
Tom Hull – on the Web	B

The authors of the Penguin Guide to Jazz Recordings awarded the album three stars, and stated, "Workman is... a forceful leader who has moved on to explore areas of musical freedom influenced by African idioms and frequently resembling the trance music of the griots... Workman bows, triple-stops and produces unreliably pitched sounds (presumably from below the bridge), leaving it to Crispell... to give the performance its undoubted sense of coherence." However, they noted that, in relation to Crispell, "Workman's ideas are developed less completely and, while they often lead to more adventurous solo excursions from the individual performers, they rarely do much more than peter out."

== Track listing ==
All compositions by Reggie Workman.

1. "Suite for H.P. Madame" – 26:00
2. "Medea" – 12:15
3. "November 1" – 15:00
4. "Jus' Ole Mae (Revisited)" – 14:20
- Track 1 recorded in January 1989. Tracks 2–4 recorded in July 1989.

== Personnel ==
- Don Byron – clarinet
- Jeanne Lee – vocals
- Michele Navazio – guitar
- Marilyn Crispell – piano
- Reggie Workman – bass
- Gerry Hemingway – percussion
