= 1961 (Eric Dolphy album) =

Live album by Eric Dolphy Quartet
- Released: late 1970s
- Recorded: December 1, 1961
- Venue: Studio 15, Munich, Germany
- Genre: Jazz
- Label: Jazz Connoisseur; JC 107

1961 is a live album by multi-instrumentalist Eric Dolphy, with McCoy Tyner (piano), Reggie Workman (double bass), and Mel Lewis (drums).

== Recording and music ==
The John Coltrane Quintet, with Dolphy, toured Europe during November 11–December 4, 1961. On December 1, the group performed at the Deutsches Museum in Munich, Germany, after which Dolphy, Tyner, and Workman visited a local club, where they jammed with drummer Lewis, who had previously performed with the Quintet on November 26, substituting for Elvin Jones. The music features extended improvisations on jazz standards, but the recording is of mediocre quality.

== Releases ==
The recording was originally issued on vinyl with three tracks ("On Green Dolphin Street", "Softly, as in a Morning Sunrise", and "The Way You Look Tonight") during the late 1970s by the Italian Jazz Connoisseur label with the title 1961, and with Tyner listed as "Lalo Schifrin" and Workman as "Bob Cunningham." The album was reissued by a variety of labels and with different titles over the years, with some releases adding a fourth track ("Oleo") recorded at the same session: Quartet 1961 (Musidisc, 1981); Live in Germany (Stash, 1990); Tempo di Jazz (Tempo di Jazz, 1990); Softly, as in a Morning Sunrise (Natasha Imports, 1992); Live in Germany (Magnetic Records, 1992); Softly, as in a Morning Sunrise (Random Chance, 2003); Complete Recordings (Lone Hill Jazz, 2004); Munich Jam Session December 1, 1961 (Rare Live Recordings, 2006). Several of these recordings incorrectly list the date as December 2, 1961; others have incorrect track titles.

== Reception ==
Professional ratings
Review scores
| Source | Rating |
|---|---|
| AllMusic | 1.5/5 stars |
| AllMusic | 3.5/5 stars |
| The Penguin Guide to Jazz | 3/4 stars |

In a review for AllMusic, Scott Yanow praised the musicians' "fine" playing, but noted that "the recording quality... is pretty bad, making much of this historic music fairly unlistenable."

The authors of The Penguin Guide to Jazz Recordings called the album an "historical document," and stated that, despite the poor sound quality, "there's enough detail for students of Dolphy to work out how he worked his way through and across the changes."

A reviewer for All About Jazz wrote: "even despite incredible distortion and difficult resolution there's always room for more Dolphy on the shelf. Top-notch material here, displaying the same buoyant sense of adventure and unerring swing that made him a singular voice."

James Beaudreau of One Final Note commented: "If you can get past the very low recording quality, there's some nice stuff here... Dolphy is... in good form... Lewis is forceful and modern sounding... Tyner and Workman are likewise excellent throughout."

== Track listing ==
1. "On Green Dolphin Street" (Bronisław Kaper, Ned Washington) – 23:27
2. "Softly, as in a Morning Sunrise" (Sigmund Romberg, Oscar Hammerstein II) – 14:42
3. "The Way You Look Tonight" (Jerome Kern, Dorothy Fields) – 11:39
4. "Oleo" (Sonny Rollins) – 18:01 (from same session, on reissues only)

== Personnel ==
- Eric Dolphy – bass clarinet, alto saxophone, flute
- McCoy Tyner – piano
- Reggie Workman – double bass
- Mel Lewis – drums
