= Time Being (Trio 3 album) =

Studio album by Trio 3
- Released: 2006
- Recorded: March 6, 7 & 8, 2005
- Studio: Peter Karl, Brooklyn
- Genre: Jazz
- Length: 58:59
- Label: Intakt

Trio 3 chronology
Open Ideas (2002)	Time Being (2006)	Wha's Nine: Live at the Sunset (2008)

Time Being is an album by Trio 3, a jazz group consisting of saxophonist Oliver Lake, bassist Reggie Workman and drummer Andrew Cyrille. It was recorded in 2005 and released on the Intakt label.

== Reception ==
Professional ratings
Review scores
Source	Rating
The Penguin Guide to Jazz Recordings	3.5/4 stars
Tom Hull – on the Web	B+

The All About Jazz review by Nic Jones states "In the midst of all the derivative stuff, thankfully there is still potent music like this, and as a model of individual and group expression it offers nothing less than a working definition."

== Track listing ==
1. "A Chase" (Oliver Lake) – 6:07
2. "Medea " (Reggie Workman) – 5:23
3. "Tight Rope" (Andrew Cyrille) – 6:17
4. "Equilateral" (Lake, Workman, Cyrille) – 8:44
5. "Lope" (Oliver Lake) – 4:41
6. "Time Was" (Lake, Workman, Cyrille) – 8:43
7. "Playing for Keeps" (Lake, Workman, Cyrille) – 6:38
8. "Giving (The Whirlwind)" (Andrew Cyrille) – 4:24
9. "Time Being" (Lake, Workman, Cyrille) – 5:09
10. "Special People" (Andrew Cyrille) – 4:53

== Personnel ==
- Oliver Lake - alto saxophone, sopranino saxophone
- Reggie Workman – bass
- Andrew Cyrille – drums
