= Cerebral Caverns =

Studio album by Reggie Workman
- Released: 1995
- Recorded: April 27 and 28, 1995
- Studio: Sound on Sound Studios, New York
- Genre: Jazz
- Length: 56:05
- Label: Postcards Records; POST1010

Reggie Workman chronology
| Summit Conference (1994) | Cerebral Caverns (1995) |

Cerebral Caverns is an album by bassist/composer Reggie Workman. It was recorded on April 27 and 28, 1995, in New York City, and was released by Postcards Records that same year. On the album, Workman is heard in a variety of instrumental combinations, in groups featuring multi-instrumentalist Sam Rivers, trombonist Julian Priester, pianist Geri Allen, harpist Elizabeth Panzer, drummers Al Foster and Gerry Hemingway, and tabla player Tapan Modak. Rivers and Priester previously appeared on Workman's album Summit Conference.

== Reception ==
Professional ratings
Review scores
| Source | Rating |
|---|---|
| AllMusic | 4.5/5 stars |
| DownBeat | 4/5 stars |
| The Penguin Guide to Jazz Recordings | 3.5/4 stars |

A reviewer for DownBeat awarded the album 4 stars and stated: "Workman... explores a world apart from any genre's idioms... this entire team of spelunkers digs where we've seldom gone before, flooding dark chambers with their flashes of brilliance. What Workman brings to light on Cerebral Caverns is fantastically rare and rewards repeated listening."

The authors of The Penguin Guide to Jazz Recordings called Cerebral Caverns and Summit Conference "cracking records made by top-flight players," and praised Geri Allen's playing, commenting that she is "always better on other people's dates... she's called on to do the sort of high-intensity stuff that Marilyn Crispell brought to previous Workman groups."

Nicky Baxter, writing for Metroactive, remarked: "the spirit of community and mutual admiration is fully evident... this session reveals the bassist's attraction to the new. The sonic terrain, along with the personnel, shifts from tune to tune. Elements of free improvisation, European classical and eastern music entwine to form a wholly individual sound... Cerebral Caverns is genuine and, yes, intelligent music."

== Track listing ==
All compositions by Reggie Workman.

1. "Cerebral Caverns I" – 7:14
2. "What's In Your Hand" – 5:02
3. "Fast Forward" – 6:40
4. "Ballad Explorations I" – 8:44
5. "Half Of My Soul (Tristan's Love Theme)" – 7:01
6. "Eastern Persuasion" – 5:30
7. "Evolution" – 8:24
8. "Seasonal Elements (Spring-Summer-Fall-Winter)" – 7:30

== Personnel ==
- Reggie Workman – bass
- Sam Rivers – tenor saxophone (tracks 3, 4), soprano saxophone (track 7), flute (tracks 1, 5)
- Julian Priester – trombone (tracks 3, 4, 5)
- Geri Allen – piano (tracks 2, 4, 5, 7, 8)
- Elizabeth Panzer – harp (tracks 1, 5, 6, 8)
- Al Foster – drums (tracks 3, 5)
- Gerry Hemingway – drums (tracks 1, 2, 4, 6, 7), electronic drum pads (track 1)
- Tapan Modak – tabla (tracks 4, 5)

== Production ==
- Ralph Simon – producer
- Joe Barbaria – engineer
- Sibyl R. Golden – executive producer
- Francis Davis – liner notes
