= Live in Willisau =

Live album by Trio 3
- Released: 1997
- Recorded: August 27, 1992
- Venue: Willisau
- Genre: Jazz
- Length: 62:32
- Label: Dizim
- Producer: Peter Bürli

Trio 3 chronology
Live in Willisau (1997)	Encounter (2000)

Live in Willisau is the debut album by Trio 3, a jazz group consisting of saxophonist Oliver Lake, bassist Reggie Workman and drummer Andrew Cyrille. It was recorded in 1992 at the Swiss Jazz Festival Willisau and released in 1997 on the German Dizim label.

== Reception ==
Professional ratings
Review scores
Source	Rating
AllMusic	4/5 stars

In his review for AllMusic, Thom Jurek states "Lake, while the front-line player here, actually acts as the gatekeeper among melody, harmony, and rhythm, and among the various approaches to subverting or at least stretching them outside the blues or swing context."

The JazzTimes review by Willard Jenkins notes "Though Oliver Lake, who sticks to his alto sax for this date, is the melodic instrument nominally out front of the trio, there is no one true leader and the sense of shared exploration permeates this disc."

== Track listing ==
1. "I Would Like Too" (Oliver Lake) – 11:11
2. "Aztec" (Oliver Lake) – 7:27
3. "Shell" (Andrew Cyrille) – 17:20
4. "Nov I" (Reggie Workman) – 14:31
5. "Hassan" (Oliver Lake) – 7:33
6. "Wha's 9" (Reggie Workman) – 4:30

== Personnel ==
- Oliver Lake – alto sax
- Reggie Workman – bass
- Andrew Cyrille – drums
