= Adegoke Steve Colson =

American pianist and composer

Adegoke Steve Colson is an American jazz pianist, composer, and educator. A member of the Association for the Advancement of Creative Musicians (AACM) since the early 1970s, Colson has performed and recorded with musicians including Joseph Jarman, Reggie Workman, David Murray, Henry Threadgill, Malachi Favors, Kahil El'Zabar, among many others. His work incorporates themes of African American identity and social consciousness, and has been reviewed in publications such as The New York Times, JazzTimes, All About Jazz, and The New York City Jazz Record.

== Early life and education ==
Colson was born in Newark, New Jersey, and raised in East Orange, where he graduated from East Orange High School. He studied piano at Northwestern University's School of Music beginning in 1967 and also studied alto saxophone with Fred Hemke. He earned a Bachelor of Music Education (BME) in 1971.

During his time at Northwestern, Colson participated in the 1968 Bursar's Office Takeover, a peaceful protest organized by Black students calling for greater racial equity. This experience influenced themes in his later compositional work.

While at Northwestern, he met drummer Steve McCall, a founding member of the AACM. McCall encouraged Colson to explore experimental jazz and introduced him to the Chicago-based collective. While earning his degree, Colson became increasingly connected with the AACM's Chicago and New York circles. Colson officially joined the AACM in 1972, shortly after graduation. Colson's experiences are noted in George E. Lewis's A Power Stronger Than Itself: The AACM and American Experimental Music (2008, p. 65), where he is referenced alongside his spouse, vocalist, composer and educator Iqua Colson, as part of the AACM's second generation

== Career ==
Colson's early recordings were with The Unity Troupe, a group he founded in the 1970s. Their debut album, Triumph!, was released in 1979 and followed by No Reservation in 1980 on the Black Saint label. These albums established Colson's approach to composition, blending improvisation with formal structure.

A 1983 New York Times review of a performance by The Unity Troupe at Soundscape described the ensemble's "exploratory yet rooted" sound and highlighted Colson's leadership.

Colson has collaborated with numerous members of the AACM and other musicians, including Kalaparusha Maurice McIntyre, Ed Blackwell, Oliver Lake, Malachi Favors, and Andrew Cyrille. He also worked with poet and activist Amiri Baraka, composing music for several of Baraka's theatrical works.

In 2004, Colson and his wife, Iqua Colson, released Hope for Love, followed in 2009 by The Untarnished Dream, which was praised by JazzTimes.

His solo double album, Tones For (2015), was reviewed in All About Jazz and Hothouse Magazine, with critics noting its exploration of African American heritage and spiritual themes. Jazziz said the album was a "brilliant journey through varied styles and emotions".

In 2021, he premiered Incandescence, a six-part suite commissioned by the AACM and the American Composers Forum. The performance was named one of the "Top 10 moments in classical music, opera and jazz that defined 2021" by the Chicago Tribune. In 2022, his piece Suite Harlem was performed at the Harlem School of the Arts' Train Festival, and reviewed in The New York Times.

His 2023 premiere of Mirrors at Merkin Hall was co-presented by the Kaufman Music Center and the International Contemporary Ensemble.

In 2025, he released Glow: Music for Trio...Add Voice, featuring Iqua Colson, Andrew Cyrille, and Mark Helias. A profile in The New York City Jazz Record described Colson as "an authentic purveyor of detail and form" with "enormous harmonic sophistication."

== Other work ==
Colson has composed music for theatrical productions including Adventures of a Black Girl in Search of God by Djanet Sears and The Life and Life of Bumpy Johnson by Amiri Baraka and Max Roach. His multimedia work, Greens, Rice, and a Rope, premiered at Newark Symphony Hall in 1989, after which the City of Newark declared "Adegoke Steve Colson Day."

He has taught at Bloomfield College and Montclair State University and participated in the NEA's Jazz Artists in the Schools program.

== Personal life and legacy ==
Colson is married to Iqua Colson, a composer and educator. The couple met in Chicago during their early involvement with the AACM and have often collaborated musically. They have worked in educational settings across the U.S. and internationally.

The Iqua Colson and Adegoke Steve Colson Collection is housed at the Northwestern University Music Library and includes scores, recordings, correspondence, and ephemera. In 2018, he was inducted into the East Orange Hall of Fame and was named a Steinway Artist in 2021.

== Awards ==
- 2017 Commission Here Is the Place, Our City, in honor of Newark's 350th anniversary
- Jazz Road Creative Residencies Grant Recipient
- 2022 Fromm Music Foundation Commission Recipient

== Discography ==
=== Studio albums ===
Year	Title	Label	Notes
1979	Triumph!	Silver Sphinx Records	Debut – reissued 2011 CD/LP via Universal Sound/Soul Jazz
1980	No Reservation	Black Saint	The Unity Troupe studio album
1990	Hope for Love	Silver Sphinx Records	Duo with Iqua Colson
2006	The Untarnished Dream	Silver Sphinx Records	Quartet recording with Iqua Colson, Reggie Workman, Andrew Cyrille
2015	Tones For	Silver Sphinx Records	Solo double album; explored spiritual themes
2025	Glow: Music for Trio... Add Voice	Silver Sphinx Records	Features Iqua Colson, Andrew Cyrille, Mark Helias

=== The Colson Unity Troupe ===
Year	Title	Label	Notes
1979	Triumph!	Silver Sphinx Records	Group founded by Colson; features Joseph Jarman, Doug Ewart
1980	No Reservation	Black Saint	Spoken‑word/jazz collective project

=== Collaborations & guest appearances ===
With	Title	Label	Notes
David Murray Octet	New Life	Black Saint	Member of octet featuring Colson
Andrew Cyrille Quintet	My Friend Louis	DIW	Trio member
Andrew Cyrille Quintet	African Love Supreme / Ode to the Living Tree	Venus Jazz/Evidence	Quartet appearance
Baikida Carroll Quintet	Door of the Cage	Soul Note	As pianist
Baikida Carroll Quintet	Marionettes on a High Wire	OmniTone	With Colson's piano
Butch Morris Ensemble	Conduction Collection #25, 26	New World/Cross Currents	Conduction conductor/composer
Kahil El'Zabar, Joseph Jarman, Malachi Favors, Kalaparusha McIntyre	Bright Moments: Return of the Lost Tribe	Delmark	Includes Colson's leadership & composition
Kevin Cook Quintet	Music for My Love Ones	Artistic Soundz	Featured pianist

=== Compositions featured by other artists ===
- Andrew Cyrille Quartet – The News (ECM, 2021) – features Colson compositions
- Trio Three featuring Oliver Lake, Reggie Workman, Andrew Cyrille – Encounter (Passin' Thru, 2012) – Colson composition featured
- New York Unit – Now's The Time (King, 19xx) – includes Colson writing
- Hannibal Marvin Peterson – One with the Wind (Muse, 19xx) – features Colson material
