= Curtis Clark =

- Born: 23 April 1950 (age 76); Chicago, Illinois, United States
- Died: May 19, 2023
- Genres: Jazz
- Occupation: Musician
- Instrument: piano
- Years active: 1970s–2023
- Label: Nimbus

Curtis Clark (April 23, 1950 – May 19, 2023) was a jazz pianist from Chicago, United States.

Clark was born in Chicago, Illinois in 1950, but moved to Los Angeles where he spent his student years and started composing and playing the piano. After Clark graduated in music theory and composition from the California Institute of Arts in Valencia, he set out for New York City. There he began working and recording with David Murray.

Influenced by Miles Davis, Duke Ellington, Horace Tapscott, Thelonious Monk and John Coltrane, Clark was based in Amsterdam for many years until his return to the U.S. He is now situated in New England.

While working with various groups, Clark has played with musicians including Oscar Brown, Jr., Julian Priester, Art Taylor, Billy Bang, Richard Davis, Abbey Lincoln, Charles Tyler, John Tchicai and Han Bennink.

He was a National Patron of Delta Omicron, an international professional music fraternity.

== Discography ==
=== As leader ===
- Dedications (1981, Freelance)
- Phantasmagoria (1984, Nimbus )
- Reach, Believe & Play (1984–85, Nimbus )
- Self Trait (1985, FMP)
- Deep Sea Diver (1985, Nimbus)
- Amsterdam Sunshine (1987, Nimbus)
- Letter to South Africa (c. 1987, Nimbus)
- Live at the Bimhuis (1988, Nimbus)
- Dreams Deferred (1993, Nimbus)
- Taagi (2010, NoBusiness)

=== As sideman ===
With Billy Bang

- Sweet Space (Anima, 1979)
- Invitation (Soul Note, 1982)

With Marty Cook

- Trance (1979, Circle)

With Julian Priester

- Polarization (ECM, 1977)

With J. C. Tans

- Around the World (1989, BVHaast)
