= Cameron Brown (musician) =

American jazz double bassist (born 1945)

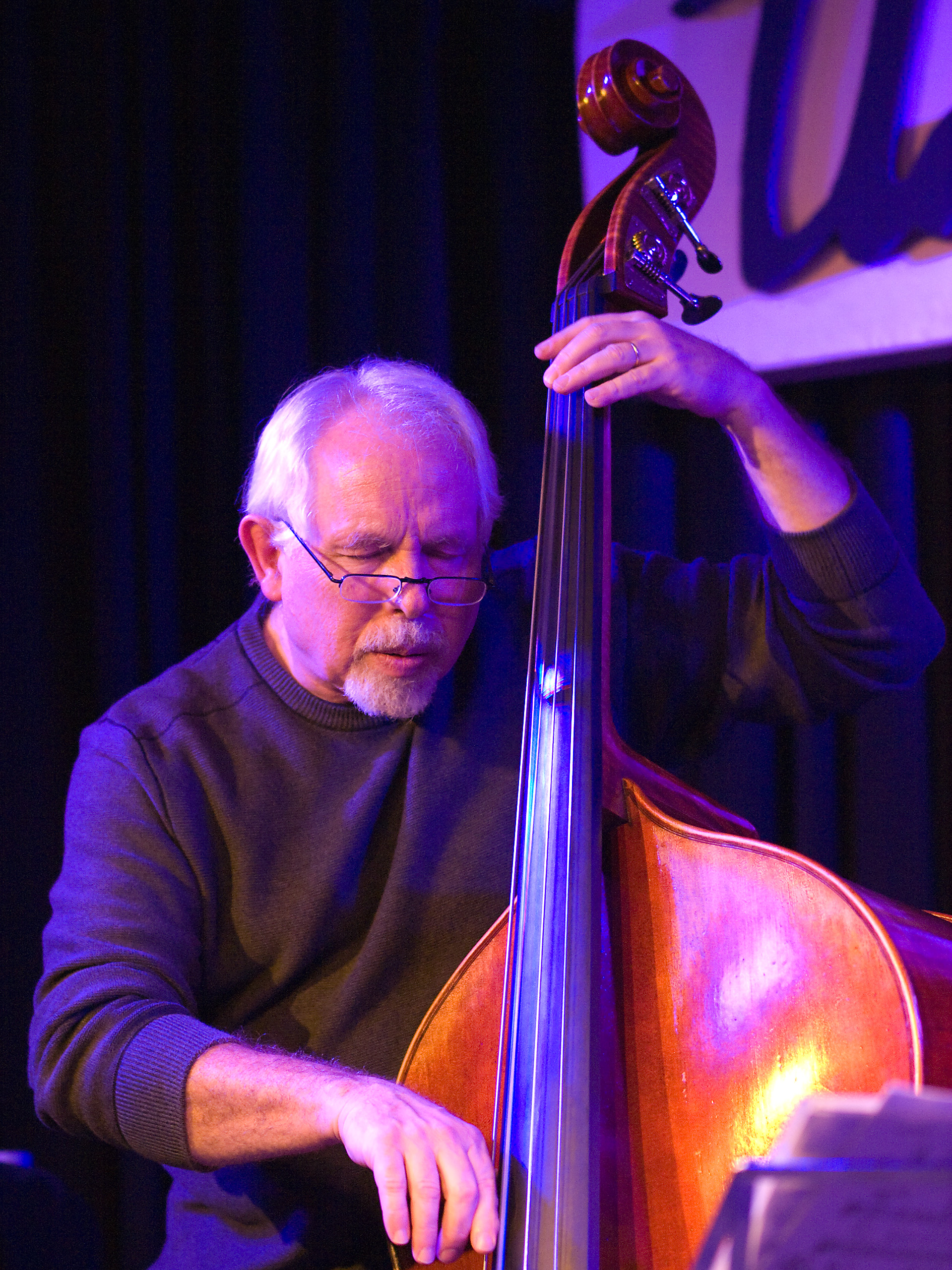
- Brown at the jazz club Unterfahrt, Munich, January 20, 2010

Background information
- Born: Cameron Langdon Brown; December 21, 1945 (age 80); Detroit, Michigan, United States
- Genres: Jazz
- Occupation: Musician
- Instrument: Double bass

Cameron Langdon Brown (born December 21, 1945) is an American jazz double bassist known for his association with the Don Pullen/George Adams Quartet.

== Biography ==
Cameron started studying music at age 10, first on piano, later on clarinet. But, drawn to the bass, he found himself playing a tin bass in a student dance band. As an exchange student in Europe, he worked with George Russell's Sextet and Big Band for one year and played with Don Cherry, Aldo Romano, Booker Ervin, and Donald Byrd. In 1966 he returned to graduate at Columbia College, Columbia University (1969, B.A. in Sociology).

In 1974, Brown met Sheila Jordan, gigged with free jazz pioneers Roswell Rudd and Beaver Harris, joined Archie Shepp's quintet in 1975, and recorded with Harris' and The 360 Degree Music Experience around that time.

The famous Don Pullen/George Adams Quartet, with him and drummer Dannie Richmond, developed into an intense and rewarding partnership which lasted during the 1980s. In addition to this quartet, Brown played with Art Blakey's Jazz Messengers, and various groups led by Shepp, Cherry, Rudd, and Richmond. He has also performed and recorded with Ted Curson, Lee Konitz, Chet Baker, Joe Lovano, Mal Waldron, Ricky Ford, Steve Grossman, Betty Carter and the John Hicks Trio, Etta Jones and Jane Ira Bloom.

Brown has appeared on more than 200 recordings. His first recording as a leader, after nearly 40 years of performing, was published in 2003 with his group The Hear and Now featuring Dewey Redman.

In addition to playing gigs and touring nationally and internationally, Brown is currently teaching jazz double bass at Green Meadow Waldorf School in Chestnut Ridge, New York, as well as offering private lessons. The musician also substitute teaches music theory classes at The New School for Jazz and Contemporary Music in New York City.

== Discography ==
=== As leader ===
- Spring Cleaning (VKH, 1992)
- Here and How (Omnitone, 2003)
- Celebration: Live at the Triad (HighNote, 2005)
- Here and How, Vol. 2 (Omnitone, 2008)
- Black Nile (Radiosnj, 2011)
- Is That So? (Stunt, 2014)

=== As sideman ===
With Archie Shepp

- A Sea of Faces, 1975
- Montreux Two, 1975
- Montreux, Vol. 1, 1975
- Montreux, Vols. 1 & 2, 1975
- U-Jaama (Unite) (1975)
- Steam, 1976
- The Rising Sun Collection, 1977
- Parisian Concert, Vol. 1, 1996
- Tomorrow Will Be Another Day, 2003
- Gemini, 2007

With Dannie Richmond

- Dannie Richmond Plays Charles Mingus (Timeless, 1980)
- The Last Mingus Band A.D. (Landmark, 1980 [1994])
- Three or Four Shades of Dannie Richmond Quintet (Tutu, 1981 [1994])
- Dionysius (Red, 1983)

With Connie Crothers

- New York Night 1989
- In Motion 1991
- Love Energy 1992
- Jazz Spring 1993
- Session 1997

With George Russell

- George Russell Sextet at Beethoven Hall (1965)
- New York Big Band (1978)

With George Adams & Don Pullen

- All That Funk (Palcoscenico, 1979)
- More Funk (Palcoscenico, 1979)
- Don't Lose Control (Soul Note, 1979)
- Earth Beams (Timeless, 1981)
- Life Line (Timeless, 1981)
- City Gates (Timeless, 1983)
- Live at the Village Vanguard (Soul Note, 1983)
- Live at the Village Vanguard Vol. 2 (Soul Note, 1983)
- Decisions (Timeless, 1984)
- Live at Montmartre (Timeless, 1985)
- Breakthrough (Blue Note, 1986)
- Song Everlasting (Blue Note, 1987)

With Houston Person

- Christmas with Houston Person and Friends (Muse, 1994)

With Dewey Redman

- Living on the Edge (Black Saint, 1989)
- Choices (Enja, 1992)
- In London (Palmetto, 1996)

With Mal Waldron

- Moods (Enja, 1978)

With Jack Walrath

- Revenge of the Fat People (Stash, 1981)

With Joe Lovano

- Friendly Fire with Greg Osby (Blue Note, 1998)
- Flights of Fancy: Trio Fascination Edition Two (Blue Note, 2000)

With Jon Lucien

- Mind's Eye 1974
- Song for My Lady 1975

With Sheila Jordan

- Confirmation 1975
- I've Grown Accustomed to the Bass 2000

With Salvatore Bonafede

- Actor Actress 1990
- Plays Gershwin 1993

With Steve Slagle

- Reincarnation 1994
- New New York 2000

=== With others ===
- 1976 Doublet, Mickey Tucker
- 1979 Beautiful Africa, Beaver Harris
- 1979 Live at Nyon, Beaver Harris
- 1982 Real Jazz for the Folks Who Feel Jazz, David Lahm
- 1986 A House Full of Love, Grover Washington Jr.
- 1992 In the Moment, Richard Tabnik Trio
- 1992 Spring Cleaning, Gilbert Isbin
- 1992 " Bihogo", Chris Joris
- 1992 Travelin' Light, Della Griffin
- 1994 360 Aeutopia, Massimo Urbani
- 1994 Original Superband, Charlie Persip
- 1994 Reverence, Michael Bocian
- 1995 Other Half of Me, Bernie Bierman
- 1996 Walls–Bridges, Ed Blackwell
- 1999 Feeling Free, Grady Tate
- 1999 Modern Jazz, Neal Haiduck
- 1999 Swimming, Tom Varner
- 1999 The Great Bridge, Emil Hess
- 1999 Walking Woman, Mary LaRose
- 2000 Explosion, Mike Longo
- 2001 Group Therapy, Jim McNeely
- 2001 Second Communion, Tom Varner
- 2002 Into the Sunlight, Bob Magnuson
- 2002 Rothko, Dave Ballou
- 2003 Ti Adoro, Luciano Pavarotti
- 2004 Presence, Lisa Sokolov
- 2004 Spirits, Michael Musillami
- 2006 Translucent Space, Jason Rigby
- 2008 Ceremony, Ceremony
- 2008 It's Always You, Lainie Cooke
- 2008 Soul & Creation, Raul de Souza
- 2011 Just Sayin', Alan Rosenthal
- 2012 Boplicity, Ronnie Cuber
- 2012 Early Reflections, Niels Vincentz
- 2012 Old LP, Bob Telson
- 2013 Sixteen Sunsets, Jane Ira Bloom
