= His Final Work =

Studio album by Charles Mingus
- Released: 1977
- Recorded: November 6, 1977
- Studio: Studio 21, New York
- Genre: Jazz
- Label: Who's Who in Jazz
- Producer: Lionel Hampton

Charles Mingus chronology
Cumbia & Jazz Fusion (1977)	His Final Work (1977)

Professional ratings
Review scores
Source	Rating
The Penguin Guide to Jazz Recordings	3/4 stars

His Final Work is an album credited to Charles Mingus, released in 1977. His Final Work is a reissue of Lionel Hampton Presents Charles Mingus, released in 1977, which was also reissued as The Music of Charles Mingus and credited to Lionel Hampton. His Final Work comprises the final recording session that Mingus played an instrument on. Shortly after the completion of the recording sessions, Mingus was diagnosed with amyotrophic lateral sclerosis, which would lead to his death. The album features arrangements of Mingus's compositions by Paul Jeffrey.

Mingus changed the title of his composition about Nelson Rockefeller's handling of the Attica Prison riot, "Remember Rockefeller at Attica", to "Just for Laughs" to disguise the piece from Hampton who was friends with Rockefeller and a supporter of the Republican Party.

== Track listing ==
All compositions by Charles Mingus.

Side one
No.	Title	Length
1.	"Just For Laughs, Part. 1"	3:26
2.	"Peggy's Blue Skylight"	5:13
3.	"Caroline Keikke Mingus"	6:15
4.	"Slop"	5:05

Side two
No.	Title	Length
5.	"Just For Laughs, Part. 2"	2:36
6.	"Fables Of Faubus"	6:30
7.	"Duke Ellington's The Sound Of Love"	7:27
8.	"Farewell Farewell"	5:54

== Personnel ==
Musicians

- Charles Mingus – double bass
- Bob Neloms – piano
- Lionel Hampton – vibraphone
- Dannie Richmond – drums
- Paul Jeffrey – tenor saxophone, arranger
- Ricky Ford – tenor saxophone
- Gerry Mulligan – baritone saxophone
- Jack Walrath – trumpet
- Woody Shaw – trumpet
- Peter Matt – french horn

Production

- Robert W. Schachner – executive producer
- Lionel Hampton – producer
- Alun Morgan – liner notes
