= Three or Four Shades of Blues =

Studio album by Charles Mingus
- Released: 1977
- Recorded: March 9–10, and 29, 1977
- Studio: Atlantic Studios, New York; Record Plant, Los Angeles
- Genre: Jazz
- Length: 44:13
- Label: Atlantic
- Producer: Ilhan Mimaroglu

Charles Mingus chronology
Changes Two (1975)	Three or Four Shades of Blues (1977)	Cumbia & Jazz Fusion (1978)

Three or Four Shades of Blues is a studio album by the American jazz bassist and bandleader Charles Mingus. It was recorded in sessions held on March 9 and 11, 1977, at New York City's Atlantic Studios, and on March 29 at the Record Plant in Los Angeles. The album features two new versions of Mingus's "standards" and three new compositions performed by large ensembles featuring saxophonists Ricky Ford, George Coleman, and Sonny Fortune, pianist Jimmy Rowles, guitarists Larry Coryell, Philip Catherine and John Scofield, bassists Ron Carter and George Mraz, trumpeter Jack Walrath, and drummer Dannie Richmond.

== Critical reception ==
Professional ratings
Review scores
Source	Rating
AllMusic	3/5 stars
The Penguin Guide to Jazz Recordings	3/4 stars
Q	3/5 stars
Rolling Stone Jazz Record Guide	3/5 stars
The Village Voice	A−

In a contemporary review for The Village Voice, Robert Christgau said the second side on Three or Four Shades of Blue was "the best composed bebop" he had heard in 1977, partly because Coryell and Fortune gave their most impressive performances in some time. The New Yorker found the record "subtle and funny and full of Mingus's peculiar and unmistakable authority". AllMusic's Stuart Kremsky was less enthusiastic in a retrospective review, writing that it was not Mingus's "best work, but not without merit". He felt the title track was one of his most successful attempts at longer compositions, even though he said the electric guitars were out of place.

== Track listing ==
All compositions by Charles Mingus.

Side one
No.	Title	Recording date	Length
1.	"Better Get Hit in Yo' Soul"	March 9, 1977	4:35
2.	"Goodbye Pork Pie Hat"	March 9, 1977	7:00
3.	"Noddin Ya Head Blues"	March 9, 1977	10:29

Side two
No.	Title	Recording date	Length
4.	"Three or Four Shades of Blues"	March 29, 1977	12:03
5.	"Nobody Knows"	March 11, 1977	10:06

== Personnel ==
- Charles Mingus: double bass, piano, vocals, arranger
- Jack Walrath: trumpet
- Ricky Ford: tenor saxophone
- George Coleman: alto saxophone, tenor saxophone (tracks 1–4)
- Sonny Fortune: alto saxophone (track 5)
- Bob Neloms: piano
- Jimmy Rowles: piano (track 4)
- Philip Catherine: guitar (tracks 1–3 & 5)
- Larry Coryell: guitar (tracks 1–4)
- John Scofield: guitar (tracks 4 & 5)
- Ron Carter: bass (track 5)
- George Mraz: bass (tracks 1–3)
- Dannie Richmond: drums
- Paul Jeffrey: arranger
