= Mingus at Carnegie Hall =

Live album by Charles Mingus
- Released: 1974
- Recorded: January 19, 1974
- Genre: Jazz
- Label: Atlantic
- Producer: Ilhan Mimaroglu, Joel Dorn

Charles Mingus chronology
Mingus Moves (1973)	Mingus at Carnegie Hall (1974)	Changes One (1974)

Mingus at Carnegie Hall is a live album by the jazz bassist and composer Charles Mingus, recorded at Carnegie Hall in January 1974 by Mingus with Jon Faddis, Charles McPherson, John Handy, George Adams, Rahsaan Roland Kirk, Hamiet Bluiett, Don Pullen, and Dannie Richmond. The original release did not include the first part of the concert, featuring Mingus’s working sextet without Handy, Kirk, and McPherson. An expanded “Deluxe Edition”, including the entire concert, was issued in 2021.

== Reception ==
The AllMusic review by Stuart Kremsky states: "This is a fun 45 minutes, particularly for the jovial interplay between saxophonists Kirk and Adams, but in its released form, only hints at the strength of The Jazz Workshop in 1974."

Professional ratings
Review scores
Source	Rating
AllMusic	4.5/5 stars
The Penguin Guide to Jazz Recordings	3.5/4 stars
The Rolling Stone Jazz Record Guide	3/5 stars
Tom Hull – on the Web	A

== Track listing ==
1. "C Jam Blues" (Barney Bigard, Duke Ellington) – 24:32
2. "Perdido" (Juan Tizol) – 21:53

- Recorded on January 19, 1974, at Carnegie Hall, New York City

=== Expanded reissue ===
Disc 1

1. "Introduction" – 3:11
2. "Peggy’s Blue Skylight" (Charles Mingus) – 11:54
3. "Celia" (Charles Mingus) – 22:54
4. "Fables of Faubus" (Charles Mingus) – 20:51

Disc 2

1. "Big Alice" (Don Pullen) – 18:39
2. "Perdido" (Juan Tizol) – 22:32
3. "C Jam Blues" (Barney Bigard, Duke Ellington) – 24:41

== Personnel ==
- Charles Mingus – bass
- Jon Faddis – trumpet
- Charles McPherson – alto saxophone (on "C Jam Blues" and "Perdido" only)
- John Handy – tenor saxophone, alto saxophone (on "C Jam Blues" and "Perdido" only)
- George Adams – tenor saxophone
- Rahsaan Roland Kirk – tenor saxophone, stritch (on "C Jam Blues" and "Perdido" only)
- Hamiet Bluiett – baritone saxophone
- Don Pullen – piano
- Dannie Richmond – drums
