= Evidence of Things Unseen =

Evidence of Things Unseen may refer to:

- "Evidence of Things Unseen" (CSI: Miami)
- Evidence of Things Unseen (album), an album by American jazz pianist Don Pullen
- "...Evidence of Things Unseen", a song by Your Memorial from the album Redirect
