= Jazz Portraits: Mingus in Wonderland =

Live album by Charles Mingus
- Released: September 1959
- Recorded: January 16, 1959
- Genre: Jazz
- Length: 44:11
- Label: United Artists
- Producer: Alan Douglas

Charles Mingus chronology
A Modern Jazz Symposium of Music and Poetry (1959)	Jazz Portraits: Mingus in Wonderland (1959)	Mingus Ah Um (1959)

Jazz Portraits Cover

Wonderland Cover

Jazz Portraits: Mingus in Wonderland is a live album by the jazz bassist and composer Charles Mingus, recorded in 1959 and released on the United Artists label in September of that year. The original release was titled Jazz Portraits, and a subsequent edition was titled Wonderland, leading to the combined title of Jazz Portraits: Mingus in Wonderland.

== Composition ==
Both "Alice's Wonderland" and "Nostalgia in Times Square" were originally written for the 1959 John Cassavetes film Shadows as part of a complete soundtrack. However, Mingus’ music was largely replaced in the final version of the film. A partial reconstruction of the soundtrack was released in 2015 as the compilation album Shadows.

A reworked version of "Nostalgia in Times Square," featuring vocals by Honi Gordon, was recorded during Mingus' 1959 Mingus Dynasty sessions and included as a bonus track on reissues of that album, titled "Strollin'".

Although "Nostalgia in Times Square" was never a major part of Mingus’ repertoire, it has since become a jazz standard, widely performed and recorded by other musicians. Notably, the jazz fusion trio Medeski Martin & Wood frequently perform the song, often as part of a medley with Sun Ra’s “Angel Race.”

== Reception ==
The AllMusic review by Scott Yanow called the music "advanced bop that looks toward the upcoming innovations of the avant-garde and is frequently quite exciting".

Professional ratings
Review scores
Source	Rating
AllMusic	4/5 stars
The Penguin Guide to Jazz Recordings	3.5/4 stars
The Rolling Stone Jazz Record Guide	5/5 stars

== Track listing ==
All compositions by Charles Mingus except as indicated

1. "Nostalgia in Times Square" – 12:18
2. "I Can't Get Started" (Vernon Duke, Ira Gershwin) – 10:08
3. "No Private Income Blues" – 12:51
4. "Alice's Wonderland" – 8:54

- Recorded at the Nonagon Art Gallery in New York City on January 16, 1959

== Personnel ==
- Charles Mingus – bass
- John Handy – alto saxophone
- Booker Ervin – tenor saxophone (tracks 1, 3 & 4)
- Richard Wyands – piano
- Dannie Richmond – drums
