= Mingus (Charles Mingus album) =

Studio album by Charles Mingus
- Released: October or November 1961
- Recorded: 20 October and 11 November 1960
- Studio: Nola Penthouse Sound Studios, New York City
- Genre: Jazz
- Length: 39:52
- Label: Candid CJM-8021/CJS-9021

Charles Mingus chronology
Pre-Bird (1961)	Mingus (1961)	Newport Rebels (1961)

Professional ratings
Review scores
Source	Rating
AllMusic	3/5 stars
DownBeat	4/5 stars
The Penguin Guide to Jazz Recordings	3.5/4 stars
The Rolling Stone Jazz Record Guide	5/5 stars

Mingus is an album by the jazz bassist and composer Charles Mingus. The album was recorded in October and November 1960 in New York and released in late 1961 on Nat Hentoff's Candid label.

== Background ==
At this time Mingus was working regularly with a piano-less quartet featuring Eric Dolphy, Ted Curson and Dannie Richmond, as heard on the Charles Mingus Presents Charles Mingus album also recorded in October 1960. The Mingus album features one track, "Stormy Weather", recorded by the same quartet, plus two tracks recorded by a larger group featuring piano and additional horns.

The track "M.D.M." weaves together the themes from three compositions: Duke Ellington's "Main Stem", Thelonious Monk's "Straight, No Chaser" and Mingus's own "Fifty-First Street Blues". The track "Lock 'Em Up" was inspired by a period of treatment that Mingus describes undergoing in his autobiography Beneath the Underdog, at New York's Bellevue psychiatric facility.

== Track listings ==
=== Candid release ===
1. "M.D.M. (Monk, Duke and Me)" – 19:49
2. "Stormy Weather"* – 13:23
3. "Lock 'Em Up (Hellview of Bellevue)" – 6:40

All compositions by Charles Mingus except * by Harold Arlen & Ted Koehler

=== Barnaby reissue ===
In April, 1974, Barnaby Records reissued this album as Mingus: The Candid Recordings (KZ-31034), adding the track "Vasserlean", which had appeared only on a 1961 Candid Records various-artists collection called Jazz Life (CJM-8019/CJS-9019). The new track listing was:

1. "M.D.M. (Monk, Duke and Me)" – 19:49
2. "Vasserlean" – 6:35
3. "Stormy Weather" – 13:23
4. "Lock 'Em Up (Hellview of Bellevue)" – 6:40

=== Jazz Man reissue ===
In 1980, Jazz Man Records reissued this album under its original Candid title, Mingus (JAZ-5002), also including the track "Vasserlean." The track listing was:

1. "Stormy Weather" – 13:23
2. "Lock 'Em Up (Hellview of Bellevue)" – 6:40
3. "M.D.M. (Monk, Duke and Me)" – 19:49
4. "Vasserlean" – 6:35

== Personnel ==
- Charles Mingus – bass
- Ted Curson, Lonnie Hillyer – trumpet
- Jimmy Knepper, Britt Woodman – trombone
- Charles McPherson – alto saxophone
- Eric Dolphy – alto saxophone, flute and bass clarinet
- Booker Ervin – tenor saxophone
- Nico Bunink, Paul Bley – piano
- Dannie Richmond – drums
