= Dannie Richmond Plays Charles Mingus =

Studio album by Dannie Richmond and the Last Mingus Band
- Released: 1981
- Recorded: August 18, 1980; Fonoprint Studio, Bologna, Italy
- Genre: Jazz
- Length: 43:28
- Label: Timeless; SJP 149
- Producer: Alberto Alberti and Dannie Richmond

Dannie Richmond chronology
Hand to Hand (1980)	Dannie Richmond Plays Charles Mingus (1981)	The Last Mingus Band A.D. (1980)

Dannie Richmond Plays Charles Mingus is an album by drummer Dannie Richmond and the Last Mingus Band which was recorded in Italy in 1980 and released on the Dutch Timeless label. The album features compositions by jazz bassist Charles Mingus performed by members of his final working group with Cameron Brown substituting for the late Mingus.

== Reception ==
Professional ratings
Review scores
Source	Rating
AllMusic	4/5 stars

Scott Yanow of Allmusic notes, "Everyone is in fine form and, although one misses Mingus, the music has its exciting moments".

== Track listing ==
All compositions by Charles Mingus except as indicated

1. "Fables of Faubus" – 13:21
2. "Goodbye Pork Pie Hat" – 4:47
3. "Nostalgia in Times Square" – 4:49
4. "Noddin' Your Head Blues" – 5:10
5. "Duke Ellington's Sound of Love" – 10:14
6. "Wee" (Sy Johnson) – 5:07

== Personnel ==
- Dannie Richmond – drums
- Jack Walrath – trumpet
- Ricky Ford – tenor saxophone
- Bob Neloms – piano
- Cameron Brown – bass
