= Limetree =

Limetree can refer to:

- Tilia, genus of lime trees
- Limetree Records, subsidiary of Timeless Records
