= Changes One =

Changes One may refer to:

- Changesonebowie, a 1976 David Bowie compilation album
- Changes One (Charles Mingus album), 1974
