= Bob Neloms =

American jazz musician (1942–2020)

Robert James Neloms (March 2, 1942, in Detroit – July 28, 2020, in Birmingham, Michigan) was an American jazz pianist. He also occasionally performed on trombone and organ.

== Career ==
Neloms won a scholarship contest run by Downbeat in 1959 and subsequently studied at the Berklee College of Music. He worked as a session musician for Motown Records from 1961 to 1963 and played with Eddie Henderson, Ricky Ford, and Bob Mover later in the decade. In the 1970s he played with Roy Haynes, Pharoah Sanders, Clifford Jordan, Freddie Waits, and Charles Mingus, and joined Junior Cook and Bill Hardman's group in 1978 recording with them until 1982. Concomitantly he worked with Dannie Richmond and James Newton. He then played with Hamiett Bluiett and performed and recorded under his own name, remaining active through the late 1980s.

== Discography ==
=== As leader ===
- Bobby Neloms (Bai, 1963)
- Pretty Music (India Navigation, 1982)

=== As sideman ===
With Charles Mingus

- The Charles Mingus Memorial Album (Burning Desire, 1977)
- Three or Four Shades of Blues (Atlantic, 1977)
- Lionel Hampton Presents: The Music of Charles Mingus (Who's Who in Jazz, 1977)
- Cumbia & Jazz Fusion (Atlantic, 1978)
- Me Myself an Eye (Atlantic, 1979)
- Something Like a Bird (Atlantic, 1980)

With Dannie Richmond

- Dannie Richmond Quintet (Gatemouth, 1980)
- Dannie Richmond Plays Charles Mingus (Timeless, 1981)
- Dionysius (Red, 1983)
- The Last Mingus Band A.D. (Landmark, 1994)

With others

- Hamiet Bluiett, Dangerously Suite (Soul Note, 1981)
- Ricky Ford, Loxodonta Africana (New World, 1977)
- Teruo Nakamura, Rising Sun (Polydor, 1976)
- James Newton, Portraits (India Navigation, 1982)
