= Manhattan Plaza (album) =

Studio album by Ricky Ford
- Released: 1979
- Recorded: August 1, 1978
- Studios: Van Gelder Studio, Englewood Cliffs, New Jersey, U.S.
- Genre: Jazz
- Label: Muse
- Producer: Richard Seidel

Ricky Ford chronology
Loxodonta Africana (1977)	Manhattan Plaza (1979)	Flying Colors (1980)

Manhattan Plaza is an album by saxophonist Ricky Ford. It was recorded on August 1, 1978, and released by Muse Records the following year.

== Background ==
This was Ford's first album for Muse Records and his second recording as leader. The band was a principally a quintet: Ford on tenor sax, trumpeter Oliver Beener, pianist Jaki Byard, bassist David Friesen, and drummer Dannie Richmond. Byard had been one of Ford's teachers at the New England Conservatory of Music. Manhattan Plaza was the building that Ford and other musicians lived in.

== Recording and music ==
The album was recorded at the Van Gelder Recording Studio in Englewood Cliffs, New Jersey, on August 1, 1978. It was produced by Richard Seidel. Of the seven tracks, three were composed by Ford, three by Byard, and one was a standard ("If You Could See Me Now"). Byard's "Olean Visit" was first recorded in 1967, whereas this was the first recording of "Fadism". Beener does not play on "Afternoon in New York". "Ceal's Place" is a blues composition. "Diane's Melody" is played as a Ford–Byard duet. The album was released by Muse in 1979.

== Critical reception ==
Professional ratings
Review scores
Source	Rating
AllMusic	3/5 stars
DownBeat	3/5 stars
The Rolling Stone Jazz Record Guide	4/5 stars

The Bay State Banner wrote that the album "presents the tenor sax of Ford in a more restrained fashion than usual, with Ford at times giving up the spotlight to the brilliant touches of Jaki Byard, one of the real geniuses on piano."

The AllMusic reviewer described the playing as "advanced hard bop".

== Track listing ==
1. "Fadism" (Jaki Byard) – 7:19
2. "Afternoon in New York" (Ricky Ford) – 4:40
3. "Diane's Melody" (Byard) – 3:30
4. "Ceal's Place" (Ford) – 4:12
5. "On the Plaza" (Ford) – 6:15
6. "If You Could See Me Now" (Tadd Dameron) – 4:52
7. "Olean Visit" (Byard) – 6:16

== Personnel ==
- Ricky Ford – tenor sax
- Oliver Beener – trumpet
- Jaki Byard – piano
- David Friesen – bass
- Dannie Richmond – drums
