= Loxodonta Africana (album) =

Studio album by Ricky Ford
- Released: 1977
- Recorded: June 1977
- Studio: Columbia Recording Studios, NYC
- Genre: Jazz
- Length: 36:38
- Label: New World; NW 204
- Producer: Michael Cuscuna

Ricky Ford chronology
Loxodonta Africana (1977)	Manhattan Plaza (1979)

Loxodonta Africana is the debut album by saxophonist Ricky Ford, recorded in 1977 and released on the New World label.

== Reception ==
Professional ratings
Review scores
Source	Rating
AllMusic	4/5 stars
DownBeat	3.5/5 stars
The Penguin Guide to Jazz Recordings	3.5/4 stars
The Rolling Stone Jazz Record Guide	4/5 stars

The AllMusic review by Scott Yanow stated: "Tenor saxophonist Ricky Ford's first record as a leader preceded the beginning of his highly rated string of Muse albums by a year. 23 at the time, Ford already had a recognizable sound that was influenced by Dexter Gordon. For this ambitious effort (which displayed the impact of his stint with Charles Mingus), Ford performs five of his original". Reviewing the reissued album in JazzTimes, Willard Jenkins wrote: "While there is ample evidence that Ricky Ford’s palette has broadened, and his sound has ripened notably over these twenty years, he has yet to craft a recording that tops this one".

== Track listing ==
All compositions by Ricky Ford except where noted

1. "Loxodonta Africana" – 4:42
2. "Ucil" – 5:13
3. "Blues Peru" – 5:00
4. "Dexter" – 5:43
5. "My Romance" (Richard Rodgers, Lorenz Hart) – 8:30
6. "One Up, One Down" (John Coltrane) – 4:24
7. "Aerolinos" – 6:54

== Personnel ==
- Ricky Ford – tenor saxophone
- Oliver Breener, Charles Sullivan – trumpet (tracks 1–4, 6 & 7)
- Janice Robinson – trombone (tracks 2 & 6)
- Jonathan Dorn – tuba (tracks 2 & 6)
- James Spaulding – alto saxophone (tracks 2 & 6)
- Bob Neloms – piano
- Richard Davis – bass
- Dannie Richmond – drums
