= Mingus Ah Um =

Studio album by Charles Mingus
- Released: October 1959
- Recorded: May 5–12, 1959
- Studio: Columbia 30th Street (New York City)
- Genres: Post-bop, hard bop
- Length: 45:53 Original edited LP; 57:07 Unedited LP and CD versions
- Label: Columbia
- Producer: Teo Macero

Charles Mingus chronology
Jazz Portraits: Mingus in Wonderland (1959)	Mingus Ah Um (1959)	Blues & Roots (1960)

Mingus Ah Um is a studio album by the American jazz musician Charles Mingus. It was recorded in May 1959 and released that October through Columbia Records. It was Mingus' first album recorded for Columbia.

The album was inducted into the Grammy Hall of Fame in 2013. It was ranked 380th on the 2020 edition of Rolling Stone's 500 Greatest Albums of All Time. The cover features a painting by S. Neil Fujita.

The title is a corruption of an imaginary Latin declension. It is common for Latin students to memorize Latin adjectives by first saying the masculine nominative (usually ending in "-us"), then the feminine nominative ("-a"), and finally the neuter nominative singular ("-um")—implying a transformation of his name, Mingus, Minga, Mingum.

== Composition ==
The Penguin Guide to Jazz on CD calls this album "an extended tribute to ancestors", and Mingus' musical forebears figure largely throughout. "Better Git It In Your Soul" is inspired by gospel singing and preaching like that which Mingus would have heard as a child, while "Goodbye Pork Pie Hat" is a tribute to saxophonist Lester Young, who died shortly before the album was recorded. The origin and nature of "Boogie Stop Shuffle" is self-referential: a twelve-bar blues with four themes and a boogie bass backing that passes from stop time to shuffle and back.

"Self-Portrait in Three Colors" was originally written for John Cassavetes' first film as director, Shadows, but was not used for budgetary reasons. "Open Letter to Duke" is a tribute to Duke Ellington, and draws on three of Mingus' earlier pieces ("Nouroog", "Duke's Choice", and "Slippers"). "Jelly Roll" is a reference to Jelly Roll Morton and features a quote of Sonny Rollins' "Sonnymoon for Two" during Horace Parlan's piano solo. "Bird Calls", however, "wasn't supposed to sound like Charlie Parker [who was nicknamed "Bird"]. It was supposed to sound like birds – the first part."

"Fables of Faubus" is named after Governor of Arkansas Orval Faubus, infamous for his 1957 stand against the integration of public schools in Little Rock, Arkansas. Columbia Records refused to allow the politically-charged lyrics Mingus had written to be included on the album, and so the song was recorded as an instrumental. In 1961, a version with the lyrics was released on Charles Mingus Presents Charles Mingus as "Original Faubus Fables".

== Edited and unedited versions ==
The original Columbia Records LP release of the album featured edited versions of six of the nine compositions. For these tracks, from one to three minutes of the performances were removed, both to meet the time constraints of the LP format and because producer Teo Macero felt the pieces were more effective in edited form. Unedited versions of these pieces were first released in 1979, on LP. The first widely-available CD edition of the album, 1987's "Columbia Jazz Masterpieces" edition, used the original LP edits. The edited version has been reissued on compact disc subsequent to 1987, including a 2019 release by Mobile Fidelity Sound Lab. The unedited version of the album was first widely released on compact disc in 1998 as part of the Sony Legacy series, and has remained available through additional compact disc reissues.

== Reception ==
Professional ratings
Review scores
Source	Rating
About.com	5/5 stars
AllMusic	5/5 stars
DownBeat	5/5 stars
Popmatters	10/10
The Penguin Guide to Jazz Recordings	+ crown
Rolling Stone	5/5 stars

Mingus Ah Um was one of fifty recordings chosen by the Library of Congress to be added to the National Recording Registry in 2003. The album was ranked number 380 of the Top 500 Albums of All-Time by Rolling Stone in 2020.

== 50th anniversary reissue ==
In 2009, Sony's Legacy Recordings released a special 2-disc 50th Anniversary Edition of Mingus Ah Um. In addition to the complete album, the Legacy Edition includes an alternative take of each of three tracks: "Bird Calls" (4:54), "Better Git It In Your Soul" (8:30), and "Jelly Roll" (6:41). The Legacy Edition of Mingus Ah Um also includes Mingus Dynasty, its companion album recorded later in 1959 (with unedited versions of four tracks - "Slop", "Song With Orange", "Gunslinging Bird", and "Things Ain't What They Used To Be" - shortened on the original LP release, as well as the bonus track "Strollin'"). These alternate takes were originally released on The Complete 1959 CBS Charles Mingus Sessions on the Mosaic label in 1993.

== Track listing ==
All tracks composed by Charles Mingus, except "Girl of My Dreams" by Sunny Clapp.

No.	Title	Length
1.	"Better Git It in Your Soul"	7:22
2.	"Goodbye Pork Pie Hat" (original LP length: 4:48)	5:44
3.	"Boogie Stop Shuffle" (original LP length: 3:43)	5:02
4.	"Self-Portrait in Three Colors"	3:06
5.	"Open Letter to Duke" (original LP length: 4:56)	5:51
6.	"Bird Calls" (original LP length: 3:12)	6:17
7.	"Fables of Faubus"	8:14
8.	"Pussy Cat Dues" (original LP length: 6:30)	9:14
9.	"Jelly Roll" (original LP length: 4:02)	6:17
Total length:		45:53 (1959); 57:07 (1979)

Bonus tracks on later reissues
No.	Title	Length
10.	"Pedal Point Blues"	6:30
11.	"GG Train"	4:39
12.	"Girl of My Dreams"	4:08

Notes

- When Columbia first issued the album in 1959, six of the album's nine tracks (tracks 2, 3, 5, 6, 8 and 9) were shortened in order to fit them on the LP. These six tracks were first restored in 1979 and three other recordings were discovered. Later reissues contain both the full-length versions of the original nine tracks and the three new tracks; some reissues retain the 1959 truncated versions.
- Tracks 1, 6, 7, 8, 9 and 10 recorded on May 5, 1959; tracks 2, 3, 4, 5, 11 and 12 recorded on May 12, 1959. All tracks recorded at Columbia 30th Street Studio, New York City.

== Personnel ==
- John Handy – alto saxophone (1, 6, 7, 9, 10, 11, 12), clarinet (8), tenor saxophone (2)
- Booker Ervin – tenor saxophone
- Shafi Hadi – tenor saxophone (2, 3, 4, 7, 8, 10), alto saxophone (1, 5, 6, 9, 12)
- Willie Dennis – trombone (3, 4, 5, 12)
- Jimmy Knepper – trombone (1, 7, 8, 9, 10)
- Horace Parlan – piano
- Charles Mingus – double bass, piano (10)
- Dannie Richmond – drums

== Certifications ==
Region	Certification	Certified units/sales
United Kingdom (BPI)	Silver	60,000^{‡}
^{‡} Sales+streaming figures based on certification alone.
