= Changes Two =

Studio album by Charles Mingus
- Released: October 1, 1975
- Recorded: 27, 28, 30 December 1974; Atlantic Studios, New York City
- Genre: Jazz
- Length: 43:02
- Label: Atlantic
- Producer: İlhan Mimaroğlu

Charles Mingus chronology
Changes One (1974)	Changes Two (1975)	Three or Four Shades of Blues (1977)

Professional ratings
Review scores
Source	Rating
AllMusic	4.5/5 stars
The Penguin Guide to Jazz Recordings	3.5/4 stars
The Rolling Stone Jazz Record Guide	4/5 stars

Changes Two is an album by Charles Mingus. It was recorded on 27, 28, and 30 December 1974 at Atlantic Studios in New York City—the same sessions which resulted in Mingus's album Changes One. Atlantic Records initially released the record; in 1993, it was issued on CD by Rhino Records.

The brief version of "Duke Ellington's Sound of Love" features vocals by Jackie Paris.

== Track listing ==
All compositions by Charles Mingus except where noted.

1. "Free Cell Block F, 'Tis Nazi U.S.A." – 6:56
2. "Orange Was the Color of Her Dress, Then Silk Blue" – 17:32
3. "Black Bats and Poles" (Jack Walrath) – 6:22
4. "Duke Ellington's Sound of Love" – 4:15
5. "For Harry Carney" (Sy Johnson) – 7:59

== Personnel ==
- Charles Mingus – acoustic bass
- Jack Walrath – trumpet
- George Adams – tenor saxophone
- Don Pullen – piano
- Dannie Richmond – drums
- Marcus Belgrave – trumpet ("Duke Ellington's Sound of Love")
- Jackie Paris – vocals ("Duke Ellington's Sound of Love")
- Sy Johnson – arranger ("Duke Ellington's Sound of Love")

=== Technical personnel ===
- Nesuhi Ertegun – engineer, executive producer
- David Gahr – photos
- Nat Hentoff – liner notes
- İlhan Mimaroğlu – producer, remixing
- Gene Paul – engineer, remastering
- Paula Scher – cover design
- Bobby Warner – remixing
