= Life Line (album) =

Studio album by George Adams-Don Pullen Quartet
- Released: 1981
- Recorded: April 5 & 6, 1981
- Genre: Jazz
- Length: 41:01
- Label: Timeless
- Producer: Wim Wigt

Don Pullen chronology
Earth Beams (1980)	Life Line (1981)	Melodic Excursions (1982)

George Adams chronology
Earth Beams (1980)	Life Line (1981)	Melodic Excursions (1982)

Alternate Cover

Life Line is an album by the George Adams-Don Pullen Quartet, recorded in 1981 for the Dutch Timeless label.

== Reception ==
The AllMusic review by Steve Loewy stated: "There is some sensational music throughout, but the listener is left with a sense that this is not all that it could have been... While not the best effort by the quartet, it is one with plenty of rewarding moments".

Professional ratings
Review scores
Source	Rating
AllMusic	4/5 stars
The Rolling Stone Jazz Record Guide	4/5 stars

== Track listing ==
All compositions by Don Pullen except as indicated

1. "The Great Escape or Run John Henry Run" – 4:42
2. "Seriously Speaking" (George Adams) – 8:02
3. "Soft Seas" (Dannie Richmond) – 7:20
4. "Nature's Children" (Adams) – 9:48
5. "Protection" (Adams) – 1:35
6. "Newcomer; Seven Years Later" – 9:34
- Recorded at Fendal Sound Recording Studio in Loenen Aan de Vecht, Holland, on April 5 & 6, 1981

== Personnel ==
- Don Pullen – piano
- George Adams – tenor saxophone, flute, vocals
- Cameron Brown – bass
- Dannie Richmond – drums
