= Gentleman's Agreement (album) =

Studio album by George Adams & Dannie Richmond
- Released: 1983
- Recorded: January 11 & 12, 1983
- Genre: Jazz
- Length: 43:46
- Label: Soul Note
- Producer: Giovanni Bonandrini

George Adams chronology
Melodic Excursions (1982)	Gentleman's Agreement (1983)	City Gates (1983)

Dannie Richmond chronology
The Last Mingus Band A.D. (1980)	Gentleman's Agreement (1983)	Dionysius (1983)

Gentleman's Agreement is an album by the American jazz saxophonist George Adams and drummer Dannie Richmond, recorded in 1983 and released on the Italian Soul Note label.

== Reception ==
Professional ratings
Review scores
Source	Rating
AllMusic	3/5 stars
The Penguin Guide to Jazz	3/4 stars

The AllMusic review by Ron Wynn states "Sizzling cuts, with old pros Jimmy Knepper on trombone and Hugh Lawson on piano taking care of business". The Penguin Guide to Jazz awarded the album 3 stars stating "An interesting reunion of the Adams-Richmond unit which suggests that both men might have been looking for a much broader tonal and timbral range... not to be overlooked".

== Track listing ==
All compositions by Hugh Lawson except as indicated

1. "More Sightings" (George Adams) - 5:10
2. "Don't Take Your Love from Me" (Henry Nemo) - 4:50
3. "Symphony for Five" (Dannie Richmond) - 11:30
4. "Prayer for a Jitterbug" - 8:20
5. "Dream of the Rising Sun" - 6:20
6. "Rip Off" - 7:36

- Recorded at the Vanguard Studios in New York City on January 11 & 12, 1983

== Personnel ==
- George Adams – tenor saxophone, flute
- Dannie Richmond – drums
- Jimmy Knepper - trombone
- Hugh Lawson – piano
- Mike Richmond – bass
