= Cumbia & Jazz Fusion =

Studio album by Charles Mingus
- Released: 1978
- Recorded: March 29–31, 1976 at Sound WorkShop and Dirmaphon Studio, Rome, Italy; March 1 & March 10, 1977 in NYC
- Genre: Jazz
- Length: 50:16
- Label: Atlantic
- Producers: Ilhan Mimaroglu, Daniele Senatore

Charles Mingus chronology
Three or Four Shades of Blues (1977)	Cumbia & Jazz Fusion (1978)	His Final Work (1979)

Professional ratings
Review scores
Source	Rating
AllMusic	4/5 stars
The Penguin Guide to Jazz Recordings	3.5/4 stars
The Rolling Stone Jazz Record Guide	5/5 stars
Sounds	4/5 stars
The Village Voice	B+

Cumbia & Jazz Fusion is an album by Charles Mingus, recorded for the Atlantic label in 1977. It features two extended compositions written for the film Todo Modo by Mingus and performed by large ensembles featuring Jack Walrath, Jimmy Knepper, Paul Jeffrey, Ricky Ford, Dannie Richmond, Candido, Ray Mantilla, George Adams and Danny Mixon. The CD reissue added two solo performances by Mingus on piano.

== Critical reception ==
Village Voice critic Robert Christgau felt Cumbia & Jazz Fusion's loftier compositions suggested Mingus was more of an "important jazz eccentric" rather than a "great": "The 27-minute title fantasia is rich, lively, irreverent, and enjoyable, but it's marred by overly atmospheric Hollywood-at-the-carnival moments, while the kitschy assumed seriousness of 'Music for Todo Modo' almost ruins its fresh big-band colors." AllMusic critic Scott Yanow later wrote: "The music is episodic but generally holds its own away from the film".

== Track listing ==
All compositions by Charles Mingus

No.	Title	recording date	Length
1.	"Cumbia and Jazz Fusion"	March 10, 1977	28:05
2.	"Music for "Todo Modo""	March 29–31, 1976	22:21
3.	"Wedding March/Slow Waltz"	March 1, 1977	2:04
4.	"Wedding March/Slow Waltz [alternate take]"	March 1, 1977	2:21

Tracks 3 & 4 are bonus tracks on CD.

== Personnel ==
- Charles Mingus: bass, vocals, percussion, arranger
- Jack Walrath: trumpet, percussion (tracks 1 & 2)
- Jimmy Knepper: trombone, bass trombone (track 1)
- Mauricio Smith: flute, piccolo, soprano saxophone, alto saxophone (track 1)
- Paul Jeffrey: oboe, tenor saxophone (track 1)
- Gene Scholtens: bassoon (track 1)
- Gary Anderson: contrabass clarinet, bass clarinet (track 1)
- Ricky Ford: tenor saxophone, percussion (track 1)
- Bob Neloms: piano (track 1)
- Dannie Richmond: drums (tracks 1 & 2)
- Candido: congas (track 1)
- Daniel Gonzales: congas (track 1)
- Ray Mantilla: congas (track 1)
- Alfredo Ramirez: congas (track 1)
- Bradley Cunningham: percussion (track 1)
- Dino Piana: trombone (track 2)
- Anastasio Del Bono: oboe, english horn (track 2)
- Pasquale Sabatelli: bassoon (track 2)
- Roberto Laneri: bass clarinet (track 2)
- Giancarlo Maurino: alto saxophone (uncredited) (track 2)
- Quarto Maltoni: alto saxophone (track 2)
- George Adams: tenor saxophone, alto flute (track 2)
- Danny Mixon: piano, organ (track 2)
