= The Last Mingus Band A.D. =

Studio album by Dannie Richmond Quintet
- Released: 1980
- Recorded: September 24, 1980
- Studio: Van Gelder Studio, Englewood Cliffs, NJ
- Genre: Jazz
- Length: 65:11 CD reissue with additional track
- Label: Landmark; 1537
- Producer: David Feinman

Dannie Richmond chronology
Dannie Richmond Plays Charles Mingus (1980)	The Last Mingus Band A.D. (1980)	Gentleman's Agreement (1983)

Gatemouth LP Cover

The Last Mingus Band A.D. is an album by drummer Dannie Richmond recorded in 1980 and originally released on the Gatemouth label as Dannie Richmond Quintet before being reissued on Landmark Records in 1994 with an additional track.

== Reception ==
Professional ratings
Review scores
Source	Rating
Allmusic	3/5 stars

Allmusic reviewer Michael G. Nastos stated " Richmond has since passed away, leaving this great recording behind as a testament to his voracity and the enduring legacy of Mingus. Highly recommended". In JazzTimes, Bill Shoemaker wrote: "The Last Mingus Band A.D. is a strong album ".

== Track listing ==
1. "Cumbia and Jazz Fusion" (Charles Mingus) – 21:33
2. "Feel No Evil" (Jack Walrath) – 5:01
3. "April Denise" (Dannie Richmond) – 5:58
4. "Seven Words" (Bob Neloms) – 7:59
5. "Cumbia and Jazz Fusion" [Alternate Take] (Mingus) – 24:30 Additional track on reissue

== Personnel ==
- Dannie Richmond – drums
- Jack Walrath – trumpet, flugelhorn
- Ricky Ford – tenor saxophone, soprano saxophone
- Bob Neloms – piano
- Cameron Brown – bass
