= Walls–Bridges =

Live album by Ed Blackwell
- Released: 1996
- Recorded: February 27, 1992
- Venue: Hampden Theatre, University of Massachusetts Amherst
- Genre: Jazz
- Length: 1:18:49
- Label: Black Saint; 120153-2
- Producer: Glenn Siegel

Walls–Bridges is a live album by drummer Ed Blackwell. It was recorded in February 1992 at Hampden Theatre, University of Massachusetts Amherst, and was released by Black Saint in 1996. On the album, Blackwell is joined by saxophonist Dewey Redman and bassist Cameron Brown. The contents of the album were reissued in 2014 on The Complete Remastered Recordings On Black Saint & Soul Note. The album is one of Blackwell's last recordings; he died in October 1992.

== Reception ==
Professional ratings
Review scores
Source	Rating
AllMusic	4.5/5 stars
The Penguin Guide to Jazz	3/4 stars

In a review for AllMusic, Scott Yanow wrote: "The concert... is an example of superior freebop. Although some of the music is boppish and there are explorations of Miles Davis' 'Half Nelson'... 'Everything Happens to Me' and 'Take the A Train,' there is also a lot of space for Redman's fairly free improvising. The communication between the three masterful musicians... is quite impressive, and overall this is a highly recommended set of explorative yet fairly accessible music."

Writing for Modern Drummer magazine, Mark Griffith commented: "we're hearing some outstanding three-way musical conversations. By listening to a group evolve right before your ears, you can greatly improve your understanding of musical communication... Let the title of... Walls–Bridges... stand for the obstacles [Blackwell] overcame and the connections he made between all genres of music: free, bebop, African and American."

== Track listing ==
1. "Half Nelson" (Miles Davis) – 19:15
2. "Everything Happens to Me" (Matt Dennis) – 13:05
3. "Boo-Boo Doop" (Dewey Redman) – 13:45
4. "Walls–Bridges" (Dewey Redman) – 13:33
5. "Obeeso" (Dewey Redman) – 10:28
6. "Blues For J.A.M." (Dewey Redman) – 5:36
7. "Take the "A" Train" (Billy Strayhorn) – 3:07

== Personnel ==
- Dewey Redman – tenor saxophone
- Cameron Brown – bass
- Ed Blackwell – drums
