= Sound Suggestions =

Studio album by George Adams
- Released: 1979
- Recorded: May 1979
- Studio: Tonstudio Bauer; Ludwigsburg, West Germany
- Genre: Jazz
- Length: 45:40
- Label: ECM 1141
- Producer: Manfred Eicher

George Adams chronology
Paradise Space Shuttle (1979)	Sound Suggestions (1979)	Hand to Hand (1980)

Sound Suggestions is an album by American jazz saxophonist George Adams, recorded in May 1979 and released on ECM later that year. The sextet features trumpeter Kenny Wheeler, saxophonist Heinz Sauer, and rhythm section Richard Beirach, Dave Holland and Jack DeJohnette.

== Critical reception ==
Professional ratings
Review scores
Source	Rating
AllMusic	4/5 stars
The Penguin Guide to Jazz	2.5/4 stars
The Rolling Stone Jazz Record Guide	4/5 stars

The Globe and Mail noted that Adams "has a strong funky streak, here expressed in the jumping 'Imani's Dance' and the blues (which Adams sings) 'Got Something Good for You'."

The AllMusic review by Scott Yanow stated: "The playing is advanced but not as fiery as most of Adams' later sets". The Penguin Guide to Jazz awarded the album 2½ stars, stating that "this was an uneasy collaboration, not really Adams's own session".

== Track listing ==
All compositions by George Adams except as indicated

1. "Baba" (Kenny Wheeler) – 13:00
2. "Imani's Dance" – 11:00
3. "Stay Informed" (Heinz Sauer) – 8:01
4. "Got Somethin' Good for You" – 5:42
5. "A Spire" (Wheeler) – 8:07

== Personnel ==
- George Adams – tenor saxophone, vocals
- Kenny Wheeler – trumpet
- Heinz Sauer – tenor saxophone
- Richard Beirach – piano
- Dave Holland – bass
- Jack DeJohnette – drums
