= More Funk =

Live album by George Adams & Don Pullen
- Released: 1980
- Recorded: November 3, 1979
- Genre: Jazz
- Length: 51:37
- Label: Palcoscenico

Don Pullen chronology
All That Funk (1979)	More Funk (1980)	Don't Lose Control (1979)

George Adams chronology
All That Funk (1979)	More Funk (1979)	Don't Lose Control (1979)

More Funk is a live album by American jazz pianist Don Pullen and saxophonist George Adams recorded in 1979 for the Italian Palcoscenico label.

== Track listing ==
1. "Metamorphosis for Charles Mingus" (George Adams, Don Pullen, Dannie Richmond) - 15:12
2. "So Nice" (Adams, Pullen) - 10:40
3. "God Bless the Child" (Arthur Herzog, Jr. Billie Holiday) - 15:30
4. "Devil Blues" (Charles Mingus, George Adams, Clarence "Gatemouth" Brown) - 10:15

- Recorded at Ciak in Milano, Italy on November 3, 1979

== Personnel ==
- Don Pullen - piano
- George Adams - tenor saxophone
- Cameron Brown - bass
- Dannie Richmond - drums
