= Colours (Sam Rivers album) =

1983 album by Sam Rivers featuring Winds of Manhattan

Studio album by Sam Rivers Winds of Manhattan
- Released: 1983
- Recorded: September 13, 1982
- Studio: Cine Music, Milan, Italy
- Genre: Jazz
- Length: 40:36
- Label: Black Saint
- Producer: Giancarlo Barigozzi

Sam Rivers chronology
Crosscurrent (1981)	Colours (1983)	Dimensions & Extensions (1986)

Colours is an album by American jazz saxophonist Sam Rivers featuring Winds of Manhattan, an 11-piece woodwind orchestra. The album was recorded in 1982 for the Italian Black Saint label. The album was composed with some sections of group improvisation. According to participant Steve Coleman, solo improvisations were omitted before the album's release to shorten the track times.

== Reception ==
The AllMusic review by Ron Wynn stated that it had "stomping, swinging arrangements".

Professional ratings
Review scores
Source	Rating
AllMusic	3/5 stars
Tom Hull	B+
The Penguin Guide to Jazz Recordings	3.5/4 stars
The Rolling Stone Jazz Record Guide	4/5 stars

== Track listing ==
All compositions by Sam Rivers

1. "Lilacs" – 5:44
2. "Colours" – 5:01
3. "Spiral" – 8:36
4. "Matrix" – 7:53
5. "Revival" – 1:58
6. "Blossoms" – 11:24

== Personnel ==
- Sam Rivers – soprano saxophone, tenor saxophone, flute
- Marvin Blackman – soprano saxophone, tenor saxophone, flute
- Talib Kibwe – soprano saxophone, tenor saxophone, clarinet, flute
- Chris Roberts – soprano saxophone, flute
- Steve Coleman, Bobby Watson – alto saxophone, flute
- Nat Dixon – tenor saxophone, clarinet, flute
- Bill Cody – tenor saxophone, oboe
- Eddie Alex – tenor saxophone, piccolo
- Jimmy Cozier, Patience Higgins – baritone saxophone, flute
