= City Gates (album) =

Studio album by George Adams-Don Pullen Quartet
- Released: 1983
- Recorded: March 27 & 28, 1983
- Genre: Jazz
- Length: 43:02
- Label: Timeless

Don Pullen chronology
| Melodic Excursions (1982) | City Gates (1983) | Live at the Village Vanguard (1983) |

George Adams chronology
| Gentlemen's Agreement (1983) | City Gates (1983) | Live at the Village Vanguard (1983) |

City Gates is an album by the George Adams-Don Pullen Quartet recorded in 1983 for the Dutch Timeless label.

== Reception ==
The Allmusic review by Steve Loewy awarded the album 4½ stars stating "By 1983, the quartet was at a musical peak, and this may be their best recording. Everything gels: The choice of tunes, the solos, and the arrangements all come together to produce one of the leading post-bop albums of the 1980s".

Professional ratings
Review scores
| Source | Rating |
|---|---|
| Allmusic | 4.5/5 stars |

== Track listing ==
All compositions by Don Pullen except as indicated

1. "Mingus Metamorphosis" (George Adams) 13:20
2. "Samba For Now" – 8:31
3. "Thank You Very Much Mr. Monk" – 7:57
4. "Nobody Knows the Trouble I've Seen" (Traditional, arranged Adams, Pullen) – 5:18
5. "City Gates" (Adams) – 7:56
- Recorded in Munster, Holland on March 27 & 28, 1983

== Personnel ==
- Don Pullen – piano
- George Adams – tenor saxophone, flute
- Cameron Brown – bass
- Dannie Richmond – drums
