= Earth Beams =

Studio album by Don Pullen/George Adams Quartet
- Released: 1980
- Recorded: August 3, 1980, to August 5, 1980
- Genre: Free jazz Post bop
- Label: Timeless
- Producer: George Adams & Don Pullen

Don Pullen chronology
A Well Kept Secret (1979)	Earth Beams (1980)	Life Line (1980)

George Adams chronology
Hand to Hand (1980)	Earth Beams (1980)	Life Line (1980)

Earth Beams is a studio album recorded by noted jazz performers George Adams and Don Pullen as the George Adams/Don Pullen Quartet. Adams and Pullen had met through their work with composer and double-bassist Charles Mingus, who had died the year the Adams/Pullen Quartet began in 1979.

== Reception ==
According to The Playboy Book of Jazz author Neil Tesser, "The participation of Dannie Richmond, Mingus's longtime drummer and protégé, only strengthened the sense that they were continuing on in Mingus's footsteps" and Earth Beams features screeching solos from Adams and "tightly wound chord clusters" from Pullen The AllMusic review by Steve Loewy stated: "Some of the best moments come from the interaction between Pullen and Adams, whose legacies left an indelible imprint on late 20th century jazz".

Professional ratings
Review scores
Source	Rating
AllMusic	4/5 stars
The Rolling Stone Jazz Record Guide	3/5 stars

== Track listing ==
1. "Earth Beams" (George Adams) - 7:58
2. "Magnetic Love Field" (George Adams, Don Pullen) - 4:38
3. "Dionysus" (Dannie Richmond) - 7:33
4. "Saturday Nite in the Cosmos" (Frank Dean, Don Pullen) - 6:47
5. "More Flowers" (Pullen) - 5:39
6. "Sophisticated Alice" (Pullen) - 7:16

== Personnel ==
- George Adams – tenor saxophone, flute, producer
- Don Pullen – organ, piano, producer
- Dannie Richmond – drums
- Cameron Brown – double bass
