= Dionysius (album) =

Studio album by Dannie Richmond Quintet
- Released: 1983
- Recorded: May 30, 1983
- Studio: Cavalieri Studio, Bari, Italy
- Genre: Jazz
- Length: 37:59
- Label: Red; VPA 161
- Producer: Alberto Alberti, Sergio Veschi

Dannie Richmond chronology
Gentleman's Agreement (1983)	Dionysius (1983)

Dionysius is the final studio album by drummer Dannie Richmond recorded in Italy in 1983 and released on the Italian Red label.

== Reception ==
Professional ratings
Review scores
Source	Rating
AllMusic	3/5 stars

AllMusic reviewer Michael G. Nastos stated "An album played by ex-Mingusites, this is one side originals and one side of Charles Mingus's music".

== Track listing ==
1. "Flying Colours" (Ricky Ford) – 6:50
2. "Dionysius" (Dannie Richmond) – 7:00
3. "Hi Jinks" (Jack Walrath) – 4:36
4. "Three or Four Shades of Blues" (Charles Mingus) – 9:03
5. "Peggy's Blue Skylight" (Mingus) – 10:30

== Personnel ==
- Dannie Richmond – drums
- Jack Walrath – trumpet, flugelhorn
- Ricky Ford – tenor saxophone, soprano saxophone
- Bob Neloms – piano
- Cameron Brown – bass
