= Live at the Village Vanguard (George Adams & Don Pullen album) =

Live album by George Adams-Don Pullen Quartet
- Released: 1983
- Recorded: August 19, 1983
- Genre: Jazz
- Length: 55:45
- Label: Soul Note

Don Pullen chronology
City Gates (1983)	Live at the Village Vanguard (1983)	Live at the Village Vanguard Vol. 2 (1983)

George Adams chronology
City Gates (1983)	Live at the Village Vanguard (1983)	Live at the Village Vanguard Vol. 2 (1983)

Live at the Village Vanguard is a live album by the George Adams-Don Pullen Quartet recorded in 1983 and released on the Italian Soul Note label.

== Reception ==
The Allmusic review by Dan Warburton said, "Live at the Village Vanguard finds four extraordinary musicians at the peak of their careers... as a document of how one of the great working units of modern jazz sounded live in one of the music's mythical venues, Live at the Village Vanguard needs some beating." The Penguin Guide to Jazz awarded the album 3 stars saying, "The Village Vanguard sets are a bit ramshackle (compare the live version of "Thank You Very Much, Mr Monk" with the one on the deleted City Gates) and much of the interest now lies in hearing how much Adams anticipates what David Murray was going to be doing (sambas, spirituals) at the end of the decade."

Professional ratings
Review scores
Source	Rating
The Penguin Guide to Jazz	3/4 stars

== Track listing ==
1. "The Necessary Blues (Thank You Very Much, Mr Monk)" (Don Pullen) – 13:15
2. "Solitude" (Duke Ellington, Eddie DeLange, Irving Mills) – 15:00
3. "Intentions" (George Adams) – 13:00
4. "Diane" (Charles Mingus) – 14:30

- Recorded at the Village Vanguard in New York City on August 19, 1983.

== Personnel ==
- Don Pullen – piano
- George Adams – tenor saxophone
- Cameron Brown – double bass
- Dannie Richmond – drums
