= Sing Me a Song of Songmy =

Studio album by Freddie Hubbard and İlhan Mimaroğlu
- Released: August 1971
- Recorded: July 20 and August 10, 1970
- Studio: Regent Sound Studios, New York City
- Genre: Avant-garde jazz; third stream; musique concrète; electronic
- Length: 40:35
- Label: Atlantic; SD 1576
- Producer: İlhan Mimaroğlu

Freddie Hubbard and İlhan Mimaroğlu chronology
Straight Life (1971)	Sing Me a Song of Songmy (1971)	First Light (1971)

Professional ratings
Review scores
Source	Rating
Allmusic	2/5 stars
Discogs	4.6/5 stars
The Penguin Guide to Jazz Recordings	3/4 stars

Sing Me a Song of Songmy (subtitled "A Fantasy For Electromagnetic Tape") is an album-length composition by avant-garde Turkish composer İlhan Mimaroğlu, released in 1971. Principal performers include jazz trumpeter Freddie Hubbard and Mimaroğlu himself.

The piece includes a chorus, strings, recitations of poems by Fazil Husnu Daglarca and other texts, organists and tape-based musique concrète, as well as Hubbard's jazz quintet: (tenor saxophonist Junior Cook, pianist Kenny Barron, bassist Art Booth and drummer Louis Hayes). It was Hubbard's fifth album released on the Atlantic label, and is one of his most experimental albums. It is regarded as an example of experimental music and musique concrète.

== Concept and execution ==
“Songmy” in the album title is a reference to “Son My”, a village in South Vietnam, the location of the mass murder, rape and mutilation of some 400 unarmed civilians by the US Army during its Vietnam campaign in 1968. The material on the album is heavily socio-political in tone, drawing on high-profile contemporary events like the Kent State shootings; the Tate–LaBianca murders; the Vietnam War; and the then escalating American protests against the war.

Mimaroğlu used his influence as an executive producer for Atlantic Records to produce an unusually high-budget album of avant-garde music. The music is a fusion of post-bop jazz with musique concrete, salted with poetry and text fragments, and united by a generally anti-war message. The format is that of a montage, in which there are not always obvious breaks between one section, or one subsection and the next. In the original Atlantic release the gatefold jacket included a collage of material drawn from various books and newspapers, which paralleled the tone of the music. On the whole, the album was not a commercial success, but it has been re-released on CD, and continues to garner positive reviews as an important work of 20th century avant-garde/jazz fusion music.

== Track listing ==
All compositions by Ilhan Mimaroglu

PART I

1. "Threnody for Sharon Tate" - 2:04
2. "This Is Combat I Know" - 8:56
3. "The Crowd" - 7:03
4. "What a Good Time for Kent State" - 1:28

PART II

1. "Monodrama" - 2:54
2. "Black Soldier" - 2:19
3. "Interlude I" - 5:48
4. "Interlude II" - 4:30
5. "And Yet There Could Be Love" - 4:28
6. "Postlude" - 1:05

== Personnel ==
- Freddie Hubbard - trumpet, flugelhorn (#1, 3, 4, 7), recitation (6)
- Junior Cook - tenor saxophone (1–4, 7)
- Kenny Barron - piano (1–4, 7)
- Art Booth - bass (1, 3, 4, 7)
- Louis Hayes - drums (1, 3, 4, 7)
- Ilhan Mimaroglu - synthesizer, processed sound
- Arif Mardin - organ, conductor
- Barnard-Columbia Chorus directed by Daniel Paget
- Strings directed by Gene Orlo and Selwart Clarke
- Mary Ann Hoxworth (1, 3), Nha-Khe (3, 8), Charles Grau (3), Gungor Bozkurt (3, 10) - recitation
