= Ode to Mingus =

Studio album by Dannie Richmond Quartet
- Released: 1979
- Recorded: November 23 & 24, 1979
- Genre: Jazz
- Length: 40:52
- Label: Soul Note
- Producer: Giovanni Bonandrini

Dannie Richmond chronology
"In" Jazz for the Culture Set (1965)	Ode to Mingus (1979)	Hand to Hand (1980)

Ode to Mingus is an album by the American jazz drummer Dannie Richmond recorded in 1979 and released on the Italian Soul Note label.

== Reception ==
The Allmusic review by Scott Yanow awarded the album 4 stars stating "Throughout the date, Richmond's drumming (which is showcased on the brief solo piece "Olduval Gorge") is heard in prime form".

Professional ratings
Review scores
Source	Rating
Allmusic	4/5 stars

== Track listing ==
All compositions by Dannie Richmond except as indicated

1. "Ode to Mingus" - 18:19
2. "Olduvai Gorge" - 2:46
3. "Love Bird" - 9:11
4. "If You Could See Me Now" (Tadd Dameron, Carl Sigman) - 3:11
5. "Drum Some, Some Drum" - 7:47

- Recorded at Barigozzi Studio in Milano, Italy on November 23 & 24, 1979

== Personnel ==
- Dannie Richmond – drums
- Bill Saxton – tenor saxophone
- Danny Mixon – piano
- Mike Richmond – bass
