= Lazuli (album) =

Studio album by Sam Rivers
- Released: 1990
- Recorded: October 9 and 10, 1989
- Studio: Studio 44, Monster, Netherlands
- Genre: Jazz
- Length: 53:06
- Label: Timeless; SJP 291
- Producer: Sam Rivers, Wim Wigt

Sam Rivers chronology
Dimensions & Extensions (1986)	Lazuli (1990)	JazzbuhneBerlin 1982, Vol.10 (1990)

Lazuli is an album by saxophonist and flutist Sam Rivers. It was recorded on October 9 and 10, 1989, at Studio 44 in Monster, Netherlands, and was released in 1990 by Timeless Records. In 2015, it was reissued as a digital download by the Japanese label Solid Records as part of their Timeless Jazz Master Collection. On the album, Rivers is joined by electric guitarist Darryll Thompson, electric bassist Rael Wesley Grant, and drummer Steve McCraven.

== Reception ==
Professional ratings
Review scores
Source	Rating
AllMusic	3/5 stars
MusicHound Jazz	2/5 stars
The Penguin Guide to Jazz	3/4 stars
The Rolling Stone Jazz & Blues Album Guide	3/5 stars
The Virgin Encyclopedia of Jazz	3/5 stars

In a review for AllMusic, Michael G. Nastos called the album "a welcome addition" to Rivers's discography, noting his "piquant, pungently sharp" sound on soprano saxophone, and describing his rhythm section as "very capable and powerful... contemporary and traditional, supportive and commanding in their own way."

The authors of The Penguin Guide to Jazz Recordings noted that the album is Rivers's "most straightahead project on record," and stated that the presence of a guitar "keeps the surface shifting." However, they concluded that the recording is "less than overwhelming."

Writing for The Rolling Stone Jazz & Blues Album Guide, John Swenson acknowledged that the album is "geared toward a wider audience" when compared with other releases by Rivers, but commented that this is "an understandable move on Rivers's part, considering the lack of respect the industry has paid his catalog."

Anne E. Johnson of PS Audio singled out the track titled "Sprung" for praise, stating that it is "a piece that could be described as retro, looking back to more of a classic bebop sound," and remarking: "You can imagine Charlie Parker playing on this track, which has a clearer structure and chordal motion that Rivers' usual free jazz output."

== Track listing ==
Composed by Sam Rivers.

1. "Swirl" – 3:54
2. "Dominant" – 2:18
3. "Lazuli" – 4:54
4. "Chant" – 2:29
5. "Coral" – 7:01
6. "Lapis" – 6:32
7. "Ripples" – 4:56
8. "Dandelions" – 3:37
9. "Devotion" – 4:34
10. "Beatrice" – 4:23
11. "Desire" – 5:01
12. "Sprung" – 3:27

== Personnel ==
- Sam Rivers – tenor saxophone, soprano saxophone, flute
- Darryll Thompson – electric guitar
- Rael Wesley Grant – electric bass
- Steve McCraven – drums
