= Decisions (George Adams and Don Pullen album) =

Studio album by George Adams-Don Pullen Quartet
- Released: 1984
- Recorded: February 2 & 3, 1984
- Genre: Jazz
- Length: 44:21
- Label: Timeless
- Producer: Wim Wigt

Don Pullen chronology
Evidence of Things Unseen (1983)	Decisions (1984)	Don Pullen Plays Monk (1984)

George Adams chronology
Live at the Village Vanguard Vol. 2 (1983)	Decisions (1984)	More Sightings (1984)

Decisions is an album by the George Adams–Don Pullen Quartet recorded in 1984 for the Dutch Timeless label.

== Reception ==
The Allmusic review by Steve Loewy awarded the album 4½ stars stating "There are some tasty extended solos by all the players, and the choice of tunes is impressive, even if sometimes they sound like simple heads... When the Quartet was at its best, as it sometimes is here, it was simply unbeatable".

Professional ratings
Review scores
Source	Rating
Allmusic	4/5 stars

== Track listing ==
All compositions by Don Pullen except as indicated

1. "Trees and Grass and Things" – 9:07
2. "His Eye Is on the Sparrow" (Traditional) – 4:28
3. "Message Urgent" (George Adams) – 8:16
4. "Decisions" – 7:11
5. "Triple Over Time" (Dannie Richmond) – 8:19
6. "I Could Really for You" (Adams) – 7:00
  - Recorded in Monster, the Netherlands on February 2 & 3, 1984

== Personnel ==
- Don Pullen – piano
- George Adams – tenor saxophone, vocals
- Cameron Brown – bass
- Dannie Richmond – drums
