= Blues & Roots =

1960 Atlantic studio album by Charles Mingus

Studio album by Charles Mingus
- Released: March 1960
- Recorded: February 4, 1959
- Studio: Atlantic Studios, New York City
- Genre: Hard bop
- Length: 38:49
- Label: Atlantic
- Producer: Nesuhi Ertegun

Charles Mingus chronology
Mingus Ah Um (1959)	Blues & Roots (1960)	Mingus Dynasty (1960)

Professional ratings
Review scores
Source	Rating
AllMusic	5/5 stars
DownBeat	4/5 stars
The Penguin Guide to Jazz Recordings	3.5/4 stars
Q Magazine	4/5 stars

Blues & Roots is an album by Charles Mingus, recorded in 1959 and released on the Atlantic label in 1960. It has been reissued on CD by both Atlantic and Rhino.

== Inspiration ==
Mingus explained the origins of this record in the album's liner notes:

This record is unusual— it presents only one part of my musical world, the blues. A year ago, Nesuhi Ertegün suggested that I record an entire blues album in the style of "Haitian Fight Song" (in Atlantic LP 1260), because some people, particularly critics, were saying I didn't swing enough. He wanted to give them a barrage of soul music: churchy, blues, swinging, earthy. I thought it over. I was born swinging and clapped my hands in church as a little boy, but I've grown up and I like to do things other than just swing. But blues can do more than just swing. So I agreed.

— Charles Mingus

== Reception ==
- Q Magazine (7/93, p. 110) - 4 Stars - Excellent - "...at his best he could drive his fellow musicians onwards and upwards with big bass playing and hoarse exhortations. Blues & Roots contains six servings of this brilliance..."
- DownBeat (1960) - 4 Stars - Very Good - "...vital and important music...[Mingus] is outstanding in his solo work...this is something worth careful and thorough listening..."

== Track listing ==
1. "Wednesday Night Prayer Meeting" – 5:39
2. "Cryin' Blues" – 4:58
3. "Moanin'" – 8:01
4. "Tensions" – 6:27
5. "My Jelly Roll Soul" – 6:47
6. "E's Flat Ah's Flat Too" – 6:37

The 1998 Rhino CD reissue included these additional tracks:

1. "Wednesday Night Prayer Meeting" – 6:59 – alternate take
2. "Tensions" – 5:18 – alternate take
3. "My Jelly Roll Soul" – 11:25 – alternate take
4. "E's Flat Ah's Flat Too" – 6:47 – alternate take

All tracks composed by Charles Mingus. Recorded February 4, 1959, at Atlantic Studios in New York City.

== Personnel ==
- Charles Mingus – bass
- John Handy – alto saxophone
- Jackie McLean – alto saxophone
- Booker Ervin – tenor saxophone
- Pepper Adams – baritone saxophone
- Jimmy Knepper – trombone
- Willie Dennis – trombone
- Dannie Richmond – drums
- Horace Parlan – piano, except for on "E's Flat Ah's Flat Too"
- Mal Waldron – piano on "E's Flat Ah's Flat Too"
- Nesuhi Ertegun – producer
- Tom Dowd – recording engineer

== Sources ==
- Sleeve notes to Atlantic Records CD reissue of Blues & Roots (Atlantic SD-1305-2)
