= Paradise Space Shuttle =

Studio album by George Adams Quintet
- Released: 1979
- Recorded: December 21, 1979
- Studios: Sound Ideas, New York City
- Genre: Jazz
- Length: 41:14
- Labels: Timeless; SJP 127
- Producer: Wim Wigt

George Adams chronology
Don't Lose Control (1979)	Paradise Space Shuttle (1979)	Sound Suggestions (1980)

Paradise Space Shuttle is an album by the American jazz saxophonist George Adams, recorded in late 1979 and released on the Dutch Timeless label.

== Reception ==
Professional ratings
Review scores
Source	Rating
AllMusic	3.5/5 stars
DownBeat	5/5 stars
The Rolling Stone Jazz Record Guide	4/5 stars

The Hartford Courant praised Adams's "muscular but lithe attack." The Ottawa Citizen wrote that "Metamorphosis for Mingus" "is a highlight for its structure, its improvisational level and its derivations."

AllMusic awarded the album 3½ stars, noting that "there's a sense of spontaneity that borders on informality, but Adams is excellent throughout".

== Track listing ==
All compositions by George Adams except as indicated

1. "Intentions" - 4:45
2. "Send in the Clowns" (Stephen Sondheim) - 4:26
3. "Metamorphosis for Mingus" - 6:53
4. "Paradise Space Shuttle" - 4:10
5. "City of Peace" - 6:46
6. "Funk-a-Roonie Peacock" - 14:00

== Personnel ==
- George Adams – tenor saxophone
- Ron Burton – piano
- Don Pate – bass
- Al Foster – drums
- Azzedin Weston - percussion
