= Dimensions & Extensions =

Studio album by Sam Rivers
- Released: 1986
- Recorded: March 17, 1967
- Studio: Van Gelder, Englewood Cliffs, NJ
- Genre: Avant-garde jazz
- Length: 35:49
- Label: Blue Note; BST 84261
- Producer: Alfred Lion

Sam Rivers chronology
Colours (1983)	Dimensions & Extensions (1986)	Lazuli (1990)

Dimensions & Extensions is an album by American saxophonist Sam Rivers, recorded in 1967 but not released on the Blue Note label until 1986 with the original catalogue number and the intended cover artwork. It was originally scheduled for issue in 1967, but held back from release until 1975, when the tracks appeared as part of the double LP set, Involution (1976, BN-LA 453-H2), which combined them with tracks recorded under Andrew Hill's leadership that would eventually see release as Change.

== Reception ==
Professional ratings
Review scores
Source	Rating
AllMusic	5/5 stars
The Encyclopedia of Popular Music	4/5 stars

The AllMusic review by Stephen Thomas Erlewine stated, "With music as risky as this, it's forgivable that it occasionally meanders (especially on the slower numbers) but, overall, Dimensions and Extensions offers more proof that Sam Rivers was one of the early giants of the avant-garde".

== Track listing ==
All compositions by Sam Rivers

1. "Precis" - 5:21
2. "Paean" - 5:25
3. "Effusive Melange" - 5:51
4. "Involution" - 7:13
5. "Afflatus" - 6:28
6. "Helix" - 5:31

== Personnel ==
- Sam Rivers - tenor saxophone, soprano saxophone, flute
- Donald Byrd - trumpet (tracks 1–3 & 6)
- Julian Priester - trombone (tracks 1–3 & 6)
- James Spaulding - alto saxophone, flute (tracks 1–4 & 6)
- Cecil McBee - bass
- Steve Ellington - drums
