= Melodic Excursions =

Studio album by George Adams & Don Pullen
- Released: 1982
- Recorded: June 6 & 9, 1982
- Genre: Jazz
- Length: 35:37
- Label: Timeless

Don Pullen chronology
Life Line (1981)	Melodic Excursions (1982)	City Gates (1983)

George Adams chronology
Life Line (1981) (1981)	Melodic Excursions (1982) (1982)	Gentleman's Agreement (1983) (1983)

Melodic Excursions is an album by American jazz saxophonist George Adams and pianist Don Pullen Quartet, recorded in 1982 for the Dutch Timeless label.

== Reception ==
The AllMusic review by Steve Loewy stated: "Both Pullen and Adams fans should be satisfied with this effort, as each performer shines. While the recording may sometimes lack the seriousness that some might prefer from these giants of the genre, it's clearly one of their best group efforts".

Professional ratings
Review scores
Source	Rating
AllMusic	3.5/5 stars
The Rolling Stone Jazz Record Guide	4/5 stars

== Track listing ==
All compositions by Don Pullen except as indicated

1. "The Calling" – 6:36
2. "God Has Smiled on Me" (Traditional) – 3:23
3. "Kahji" – 6:00
4. "Playground Uptown and Downtown" (George Adams) – 4:50
5. "Decisions" – 6:50
6. "Reflexions Inward" (George Adams) – 4:24
7. "Resolutions of Conflicts" (George Adams) – 6:32
- Recorded at Soundtek Studios in New York City on June 6 & 9, 1982

== Personnel ==
- Don Pullen – piano
- George Adams – tenor saxophone
