= Don't Lose Control =

Live album by George Adams & Don Pullen
- Released: 1980
- Recorded: November 2–3, 1979
- Genre: Jazz
- Length: 38:47
- Label: Soul Note
- Producer: Giovanni Bonandrini

Don Pullen chronology
More Funk (1979)	Don't Lose Control (1980)	A Well Kept Secret (1979)

George Adams chronology
More Funk (1979)	Don't Lose Control (1979)	Paradise Space Shuttle (1979)

Don't Lose Control is a live album by American jazz pianist Don Pullen and saxophonist George Adams recorded in 1979 for the Italian Soul Note label.

== Reception ==
The Allmusic review by Scott Yanow awarded the album 3 stars stating "Tenor saxophonist George Adams and pianist Don Pullen first joined forces in Charles Mingus' band of the 1970s and, upon the great bassist's death, they formed their own dynamic quartet, resulting in many recordings (mostly for European labels). Don't Lose Control, although their fourth record together, was the first to gain much recognition... This set is not quite as essential as some of the Adams-Pullen Quartet's later releases, but worth picking up".

Professional ratings
Review scores
Source	Rating
Allmusic	3/5 stars
The Penguin Guide to Jazz	2/4 stars

== Track listing ==
All compositions by Don Pullen except where noted.

1. "Autumn Song" (George Adams) – 8:57
2. "Don't Lose Control" (Adams) – 5:33
3. "Remember?" – 5:00
4. "Double Arc Jake" – 15:47
5. "Places & Faces" (Adams) – 3:30
  - Recorded at Theatro Ciak in Milano, Italy on November 2 & 3, 1979

== Personnel ==
- Don Pullen – piano, vocals
- George Adams – tenor saxophone, flute, vocals
- Cameron Brown – bass
- Dannie Richmond – drums
