= All That Funk =

Live album by George Adams and Don Pullen
- Released: 1980
- Recorded: November 2, 1979
- Genre: Jazz
- Length: 43:35
- Label: Palcoscenico

Don Pullen chronology
The Magic Triangle (1979)	All That Funk (1980)	More Funk (1979)

George Adams chronology
Suite for Swingers (1976)	All That Funk (1979)	More Funk (1979)

All That Funk is a live album by American jazz pianist Don Pullen and saxophonist George Adams recorded in 1979 for the Italian Palcoscenico label.

== Track listing ==
All compositions by Don Pullen except as indicated

1. "Dee Arr" - 7:15
2. "Alfie" (Burt Bacharach, Hal David) - 6:35
3. "Intentions" (George Adams) - 7:15
4. "Big Alice" - 22:25
  - Recorded at Ciak in Milano, Italy on November 2, 1979

== Personnel ==
- Don Pullen - piano
- George Adams - tenor saxophone
- Cameron Brown - bass
- Dannie Richmond - drums
