= Chet Baker Sings Again =

Studio album by Chet Baker
- Released: 1986
- Recorded: October 2 & 8, 1985
- Studio: Studio 44, Monster, Holland
- Genre: Jazz
- Length: 44:34
- Label: Timeless; SJP 238
- Producer: Makoto Kimata, Wim Wigt

Chet Baker chronology
Symphonically (1985)	Chet Baker Sings Again (1986)	There'll Never Be Another You (1985)

Chet Baker Sings Again is an album by trumpeter/vocalist Chet Baker which was recorded in 1985 and released on the Dutch Timeless label.

Professional ratings
Review scores
Source	Rating
Allmusic	3/5 stars

== Track listing ==
1. "All of You" (Cole Porter) – 4:40
2. "Body and Soul" (Johnny Green, Edward Heyman, Robert Sour, Frank Eyton) – 6:31
3. "Look for the Silver Lining" (Jerome Kern, Buddy DeSylva) – 3:52
4. "I Can't Get Started" (Vernon Duke, Ira Gershwin) – 6:54
5. "My Funny Valentine" (Richard Rodgers, Lorenz Hart) – 7:15
6. "Alone Together" (Arthur Schwartz, Howard Dietz) – 6:13
7. "Someone to Watch Over Me" (George Gershwin, Ira Gershwin) – 5:20
8. "How Deep Is the Ocean?" (Irving Berlin) – 3:48

== Personnel ==
- Chet Baker – trumpet, vocals
- Michel Graillier – piano
- Ricardo del Fra – bass
- John Engels – drums
