= "In" Jazz for the Culture Set =

Studio album by Dannie Richmond Quartet
- Released: 1965
- Recorded: September 2, 1965
- Studio: Van Gelder Studio, Englewood Cliffs, NJ
- Genre: Jazz
- Length: 30:13
- Label: Impulse!
- Producer: Bob Thiele

Dannie Richmond chronology
"In" Jazz for the Culture Set (1965)	Ode to Mingus (1979)

"In" Jazz for the Culture Set is the debut album led by the American jazz drummer Dannie Richmond recorded in 1965 and released on the Impulse! label.

== Reception ==
The Allmusic review by Ken Dryden awarded the album 2 1/2 stars stating "Drummer Dannie Richmond's debut recording as a leader looks promising on the surface... But the album is dragged down by a poor choice of material".

Professional ratings
Review scores
Source	Rating
Allmusic	2.5/5 stars

== Track listing ==
1. "High Camp" (Gary McFarland) – 3:06
2. "Sweet Little Sixteen" (Chuck Berry) – 2:14
3. "Freedom Ride" (Jimmy Raney) – 3:02
4. "The Spider" (Jaki Byard) – 3:55
5. "Blowin' in the Wind" (Bob Dylan) – 2:40
6. "Pfoofnick" (McFarland) – 4:20
7. "The Berkeley Underground" (Byard) – 4:52
8. "Mister Nashville" (Toots Thielemans) – 3:55
9. "John Kennedy Memory Waltz" (George Weiss) – 2:09

== Personnel ==
- Dannie Richmond – drums
- Toots Thielemans – harmonica, guitar
- Jaki Byard – piano
- Jimmy Raney – guitar
- Cecil McBee – bass
- Willie Bobo, Victor Pantoja – percussion
