= Live at the Village Vanguard Vol. 2 =

Live album by George Adams-Don Pullen Quartet
- Released: 1983
- Recorded: August 19, 1983
- Genre: Jazz
- Length: 58:04
- Label: Soul Note

Don Pullen chronology
Live at the Village Vanguard (1983)	Live at the Village Vanguard Vol. 2 (1983)	Evidence of Things Unseen (1983)

George Adams chronology
Live at the Village Vanguard (1983)	Live at the Village Vanguard Vol. 2 (1983)	Decisions (1983)

Live at the Village Vanguard Vol. 2 is a live album by the George Adams-Don Pullen Quartet, recorded in 1983 and released on the Italian Soul Note label.

== Reception ==
Professional ratings
Review scores
Source	Rating
AllMusic	4.5/5 stars
The Penguin Guide to Jazz	3/4 stars

The AllMusic review by Stephen Cook stated: "Everyone contributes fine solo work, while also keeping everything nice and in the pocket. A highlight from the Pullen-Adams catalog and one of the most impressive of contemporary live jazz dates". The Penguin Guide to Jazz awarded the album 3 stars, stating: "The working band in excelsis, rounding off a half-decade of activity with a couple of heated – sometimes overheated – sets. Perhaps oddly, given the chemistry, this is a band that always sounded better in the studio".

== Track listing ==
All compositions by Don Pullen except as indicated

1. "Saturday Night in the Cosmos" – 11:25
2. "City Gates" (George Adams) – 17:40
3. "The Great Escape" – 11:15
4. "Big Alice" – 17:44
- Recorded at the Village Vanguard in New York City on August 19, 1983.

== Personnel ==
- Don Pullen – piano
- George Adams – tenor saxophone, flute
- Cameron Brown – bass
- Dannie Richmond – drums
