= There'll Never Be Another You (album) =

Live album by Chet Baker and Philip Catherine
- Released: 1997
- Recorded: October 25, 1985
- Venue: Zagreb, Yugoslavia
- Genre: Jazz
- Length: 55:42
- Label: Timeless; SJP 437
- Producer: Mladen "Mike" Masur

Chet Baker chronology
| Chet Baker Sings Again (1985) | There'll Never Be Another You (1997) | Live from the Moonlight (1985) |

There'll Never Be Another You is a live album by trumpeter Chet Baker and guitarist Philip Catherine which was recorded in Yugoslavia in 1985 and released on the Dutch Timeless label in 1997.

== Reception ==
Professional ratings
Review scores
| Source | Rating |
|---|---|
| Allmusic | 3/5 stars |

The Allmusic review states "on this particular night in Zagreb, poor Baker was not playing his best: His chops are weak, and his voice is strained and shallow. Still, these four duos, with longtime collaborator, guitarist Philip Catherine, have their rewards, such as the lengthy, substantial, and melodic solos by the guitarist. There is also the opportunity to hear Baker's piano playing at length".

== Track listing ==
1. "Beatrice" (Sam Rivers) – 14:57
2. "There Will Never Be Another You" (Harry Warren, Mack Gordon) – 10:19
3. "Leaving" (Richie Beirach) – 17:26
4. "My Foolish Heart" (Victor Young, Ned Washington) – 16:08

== Personnel ==
- Chet Baker – trumpet, piano, vocals
- Philip Catherine – guitar
