= Hand to Hand (album) =

Studio album by George Adams & Dannie Richmond
- Released: 1980
- Recorded: February 13 & 14, 1980
- Genre: Jazz
- Length: 39:30
- Label: Soul Note
- Producer: Giovanni Bonandrini

George Adams chronology
Sound Suggestions (1980)	Hand to Hand (1980)	Earth Beams (1981)

Dannie Richmond chronology
Ode to Mingus (1979)	Hand to Hand (1980)	Dannie Richmond Plays Charles Mingus (1980)

Hand to Hand is an album by the American jazz saxophonist George Adams and drummer Dannie Richmond, recorded in 1980 and released on the Italian Soul Note label.

== Reception ==
The AllMusic review awarded the album 2½ stars. The Penguin Guide to Jazz awarded the album 3 stars, stating: "Hand to Hand was another co-led session, cementing what was to be another important association, with Mingus's favourite drummer, Dannie Richmond ".

Professional ratings
Review scores
Source	Rating
AllMusic	2.5/5 stars
The Penguin Guide to Jazz	3/4 stars

== Track listing ==
1. "The Cloocker" (Hugh Lawson) - 9:08
2. "Yamani's Passion" (George Adams) - 10:55
3. "For Dee J." (Dannie Richmond) - 8:07
4. "Joobubie" (Hugh Lawson) - 11:20

- Recorded at Barigozzi Studio in Milano, Italy, on February 13 & 14, 1980

== Personnel ==
- George Adams – tenor saxophone, flute
- Dannie Richmond – drums
- Jimmy Knepper - trombone
- Hugh Lawson – piano
- Mike Richmond – bass
