= Evidence of Things Unseen (album) =

Studio album by Don Pullen
- Released: 1984
- Recorded: September 28 & 29, 1983
- Genre: Jazz
- Length: 43:01
- Label: Black Saint
- Producer: Giovanni Bonandrini

Don Pullen chronology
Live at the Village Vanguard Vol. 2 (1983)	Evidence of Things Unseen (1984)	Decisions (1984)

Evidence of Things Unseen is an album by American jazz pianist Don Pullen recorded in 1983 for the Italian Black Saint label.

== Reception ==
The AllMusic review awarded the album 4 stars.

Professional ratings
Review scores
Source	Rating
AllMusic	4/5 stars
The Penguin Guide to Jazz	4/4 stars

== Track listing ==
All compositions by Don Pullen

1. "Evidence of Things Unseen" - 11:37
2. "Victory Dance (For Sharon)" - 8:24
3. "Un In the Beginning (For Nick)" - 18:03
4. "Perseverance" - 4:03
5. "Rejoice" - 1:00
  - Recorded at Vanguard Studios, New York on September 28 & 29, 1983

== Personnel ==
- Don Pullen - piano
