= Mingus Dynasty =

Studio album by Charles Mingus
- Released: May 1960
- Recorded: November 1 and 13, 1959
- Studio: CBS 30th Street Studio, New York City
- Genre: Jazz
- Length: 59:34
- Label: Columbia
- Producer: Teo Macero

Charles Mingus chronology
Blues & Roots (1960)	Mingus Dynasty (1960)	Charles Mingus Presents Charles Mingus (1961)

Professional ratings
Review scores
Source	Rating
AllMusic	4.5/5 stars
Down Beat (Original LP release)	4/5 stars
The Penguin Guide to Jazz Recordings	3/4 stars

Mingus Dynasty is a jazz album by Charles Mingus, recorded in 1959 and released on Columbia Records in May 1960. It is a companion album to his 1959 record Mingus Ah Um, and was inducted in the Grammy Hall of Fame in 1999. The title, a pun on the Ming dynasty, alludes to Mingus's ancestry, which was partially Chinese.

Tracks one, three, four, and five were released in their unedited form in 1979 on vinyl and in 1999 on CD. The cuts amount to about eight minutes.

== Track listing ==
All compositions by Charles Mingus except where noted.

1. "Slop" – 6:16
2. "Diane" – 7:32
3. "Song With Orange" – 6:50
4. "Gunslinging Bird" (Originally titled "If Charlie Parker Were a Gunslinger, There'd Be a Whole Lot of Dead Copycats") – 5:14
5. "Things Ain't What They Used to Be" (Mercer Ellington) – 7:36
6. "Far Wells, Mill Valley" – 6:14
7. "New Now, Know How" – 4:13
8. "Mood Indigo" (Barney Bigard, Duke Ellington) – 8:13
9. "Put Me in That Dungeon" – 2:53
10. "Strollin'" (Originally titled "Nostalgia in Times Square") (Mingus, George Gordon) – 4:33 [Bonus track on CD]

== Personnel ==
- Charles Mingus – bass
- John Handy – alto sax
- Booker Ervin – tenor sax
- Benny Golson – tenor sax (2, 3, 4, 6, 10)
- Jerome Richardson – baritone sax (2, 3, 4, 6, 10), flute (2)
- Richard Williams – trumpet (2, 3, 4, 6, 10)
- Don Ellis – trumpet (1, 5, 8, 9)
- Jimmy Knepper – trombone
- Roland Hanna – piano (1, 2, 3, 4, 5, 6, 8, 9)
- Nico Bunink – piano (7, 10)
- Dannie Richmond – drums
- Teddy Charles – vibes (2, 3, 4, 6)
- Maurice Brown – cello (2, 9)
- Seymour Barab – cello (2, 9)
- Honi Gordon – vocals (10)

== 50th Anniversary Legacy Edition ==
In 2009 Sony's Legacy Recordings released a special, two-disc 50th anniversary edition of Mingus's seminal 1959 album Mingus Ah Um that also includes Mingus Dynasty in its entirety on the second disc.
