= Changes One (Charles Mingus album) =

Studio album by Charles Mingus
- Released: October 1, 1975
- Recorded: December 27, 28 & 30, 1974
- Genre: Jazz
- Length: 44:28
- Label: Atlantic
- Producer: Ilhan Mimaroglu

Charles Mingus chronology
Mingus at Carnegie Hall (1974)	Changes One (1975)	Changes Two (1974)

Professional ratings
Review scores
Source	Rating
AllMusic	4.5/5 stars
The Penguin Guide to Jazz Recordings	3.5/4 stars
The Rolling Stone Jazz Record Guide	5/5 stars

Changes One is an album by the jazz composer and bassist Charles Mingus, released in 1975.

== Song notes ==
=== "Remember Rockefeller at Attica" ===
This track is dedicated to the Attica Prison Riots of 1971 and the Governor of New York State at that time, Nelson Rockefeller.

=== "Devil Blues" ===
The lyrics are by Clarence “Gatemouth” Brown, but the melody is newly composed by vocalist and saxophonist George Adams. Mingus also has composing credits, possibly for the horn lines that follow the singing.

== Track listing ==
All compositions by Charles Mingus except where noted.

1. "Remember Rockefeller at Attica" – 5:56
2. "Sue's Changes" – 17:04
3. "Devil Blues" (George Adams, Clarence "Gatemouth" Brown, Mingus) – 9:24
4. "Duke Ellington's Sound of Love" – 12:04

== Personnel ==
Recorded at Atlantic Recording Studios, New York City, on December 27, 28 & 30, 1974.

- Jack Walrath – trumpet
- George Adams – tenor saxophone, vocals
- Don Pullen – piano
- Charles Mingus – acoustic bass viol
- Dannie Richmond – drums
- İlhan Mimaroğlu – production
- Nesuhi Ertegün – production
- Gene Paul – engineer
- Paula Scher – designer
