= Fables of Faubus =

1959 song by Charles Mingus

Song by Charles Mingus

from the album Mingus Ah Um
- Released: 1959
- Genre: Jazz
- Length: 8:13
- Label: Columbia
- Composer: Charles Mingus
- Producer: Nat Hentoff

"Fables of Faubus" is a composition written by jazz double bassist and composer Charles Mingus. One of Mingus's most explicitly political works, the song was written as a direct protest against Arkansas governor Orval Faubus, who in 1957 sent out the National Guard to prevent the racial integration of Little Rock Central High School by nine African American teenagers, in what became known as the Little Rock Crisis.

The song was first recorded for Mingus' 1959 album, Mingus Ah Um. However, Columbia Records refused to allow the lyrics to the song to be included, and so the song was recorded as an instrumental on the album. It was not until October 20, 1960, that the song was recorded with lyrics, for the album Charles Mingus Presents Charles Mingus, which was released on the more independent Candid label. Due to contractual issues with Columbia, the song could not be released as "Fables of Faubus", and so the Candid version was titled "Original Faubus Fables". The personnel for the Candid recording were Charles Mingus (bass, vocals), Dannie Richmond (drums, vocals), Eric Dolphy (alto saxophone), and Ted Curson (trumpet). The vocals featured a call-and-response between Mingus and Richmond. Critic Don Heckman commented of the unedited "Original Faubus Fables" in a 1962 review that it was "a classic Negro put-down in which satire becomes a deadly rapier-thrust. Faubus emerges in a glare of ridicule as a mock villain whom no-one really takes seriously. This kind of commentary, brimful of feeling, bitingly direct and harshly satiric, appears far too rarely in jazz."

The song, either with or without lyrics, was one of the compositions which Mingus returned to most often, both on record and in concert.

== Variations ==
Several slight variations to the lyrics appear in different recordings of "Fables of Faubus" that Mingus made over the years; for example, on the "Original Faubus Fables" version from Charles Mingus Presents Charles Mingus, the line of "Oh, Lord, no more Ku Klux Klan" in the first refrain is replaced with "Oh, Lord, don't let 'em tar and feather us!", while the "no more swastikas" line is sung fourth rather than third in the stanza. Another variation comes from a 1975 recording where drummer Dannie Richmond yells "Two, four, six, eight, Nixon knew all about Watergate!"

== See also ==
- Civil rights movement in popular culture
