= Charles Mingus Presents Charles Mingus =

Studio album by Charles Mingus
- Released: January 1961
- Recorded: October 20, 1960
- Studios: Nola Penthouse Sound Studios, New York City
- Genre: Avant-garde jazz
- Length: 46:23
- Label: Candid

Charles Mingus chronology
Mingus Dynasty (1960)	Charles Mingus Presents Charles Mingus (1961)	Pre-Bird (1961)

Professional ratings
Review scores
Source	Rating
AllMusic	4.5/5 stars
The Penguin Guide to Jazz Recordings	4/4 stars
The Rolling Stone Jazz Record Guide	5/5 stars
DownBeat	4/5 stars

Charles Mingus Presents Charles Mingus is an album by the jazz bassist and composer Charles Mingus. It was released in January 1961 through Candid Records. The recording took place in October 1960. The quartet of Mingus, multi-instrumentalist Eric Dolphy, trumpeter Ted Curson, and drummer Dannie Richmond constituted Mingus' core working band at the time, and had been performing the material on this album for weeks at The Showplace in New York. To recreate this atmosphere, Mingus introduces the songs as if he were speaking to the audience, even admonishing them to not applaud or rattle their glasses. This explains why the recordings on Presents would seemingly give off the illusion of a live album, when in fact it is a studio album.

The album was recorded in New York for the Candid label, founded by Nat Hentoff. Mingus usually recorded on major labels like Columbia and Atlantic, but he was given more freedom on Hentoff's independent label.

Presents has received positive reviews from jazz critics and is among Mingus' most acclaimed albums. The album has been listed as part of The Penguin Guide to Jazz's "Core Collection."

== Music ==
=== Folk Forms, No. 1 ===
"Folk Forms, No. 1" is built on a rhythmic pattern. According to Mingus, "they had to listen to what I do on the bass. If I changed it, they'd have to go a different way. This is a very flexible work. About the only other guidance I give them is that if I hear them doing something particularly good one night, I remind them of it next time we play the number and suggest they keep it in. But as a whole, it never comes out the same". This song features melodic drum work from Dannie Richmond and sympathetic interplay by Ted Curson and Eric Dolphy. The quartet also performed the tune in Antibes with the addition of Booker Ervin on tenor saxophone; the concert was released on the live album Mingus at Antibes.

=== Original Faubus Fables ===
"Original Faubus Fables", a.k.a. "Fables of Faubus", originally appeared on Mingus Ah Um as an instrumental. Mingus introduces it sarcastically as "dedicated to the first, or second or third, all-American heel, Faubus." The lyrics are sung by Mingus and Dannie Richmond, denouncing segregation. Nat Hentoff's liner notes state, "In the club, the mood of the caricature was much more bitingly sardonic and there was a great deal more tension. Mingus says the other label would not allow him to record the talking sections, which he feels are an important part of the overall color and movement of the piece. This version is the way Mingus did intend the work to sound." (On Mingus Ah Um, Columbia Records had refused to let Mingus include the song's lyrics due to their explicit political tones and controversial subject matter, which frustrated Mingus to some degree.)

Eric Dolphy plays alto saxophone on this version, and he would perform many more on bass clarinet when he rejoined Mingus in 1964; one example from that year is the live recording from Cornell 1964, on which "Fables" was expanded to almost half an hour.

=== What Love? ===
"What Love?" is based on two standards: "What Is This Thing Called Love?" and "You Don't Know What Love Is;" and was being played in the Down Beat Club in Los Angeles as far back as 1945. According to Mingus, "people thought we were crazy, and I only did it when there weren't too many around. They wanted to hear the beat all the time, but it always seemed to me that so long as you could feel the beat you didn't have to keep emphasizing it. Moreover, you can speed it up or make it slower, as happens in Yiddish and Spanish music. Why tie yourself to the same tempo all the time?" The piece features a complex, lyrical melody performed by Ted Curson and Eric Dolphy (first on alto saxophone, then bass clarinet). Curson solos, followed by Mingus, then Dolphy; however, all four musicians play freely throughout the piece. This recording and another performance on Mingus At Antibes are particularly famous for the musical conversation between Mingus and Dolphy (on bass clarinet) that takes place before the second statement of the melody.

=== All the Things You Could Be by Now If Sigmund Freud's Wife Was Your Mother ===
"All the Things You Could Be by Now If Sigmund Freud's Wife Was Your Mother" is loosely based on "All the Things You Are," but according to Hentoff, "the musicians keep the original structure... but do not even play the tune's chord structure. The piece in general is based on A flat. Again, the rhythms change. There is no set beat, and yet there's an implicit rhythmic flow, up and down, throughout the work." Explains Dannie Richmond, "Mingus and I feel each other out as we go; but always, when the time comes back into the original beat, we're both always there. The best way I can explain is that we find a beat that's in the air, and just take it out of the air when we want it."

Nat Hentoff concludes, "For once, in these sessions, everyone in a Mingus unit reached—and maintained—that level of daring and that power to make their instruments become extensions of themselves."

== Track listing ==
All compositions by Charles Mingus.

Side one
No.	Title	Length
1.	"Folk Forms, No. 1"	13:08
2.	"Original Faubus Fables"	9:19

Side two
No.	Title	Length
1.	"What Love?"	15:23
2.	"All the Things You Could Be by Now If Sigmund Freud's Wife Was Your Mother"	8:33

== Personnel ==
- Charles Mingus – bass
- Ted Curson – trumpet
- Eric Dolphy – alto saxophone and bass clarinet
- Dannie Richmond – drums
