= Timeless Records =

Dutch jazz record label founded in 1975

- Founded: 1975
- Founder: Wim Wigt
- Genre: Jazz
- Country of origin: Netherlands
- Official website: www.timelessjazz.com

Timeless Records is a jazz record label based in the Netherlands.

Timeless was founded in Wageningen in 1975 by Wim Wigt. It has specialized in bebop, though it also did a sub-series of releases of Dixieland and swing recordings. As of 2000, the label had issued some 600 albums, and had two sub-labels, World Wide Jazz and Limetree Records.

In the late 1970s, Timeless partnered with Muse Records to distribute Timeless Muse.

The label sponsored the Timeless All Stars, a six-piece ensemble founded by Wigt in 1981. The initial membership of the group was Harold Land, Curtis Fuller, Bobby Hutcherson, Cedar Walton, Buster Williams, and Billy Higgins.

Among the label's significant releases are Dizzy Gillespie Meets Phil Woods Quintet, McCoy Tyner's Bon Voyage, Lou Donaldson's Forgotten Man and albums by the George Adams-Don Pullen Quartet.

Timeless Historical is a sub-label of Timeless Records that contain CDs dedicated to early jazz. The series started in 1991 under executive production of Chris Barber and Wim Wigt with the disc of early recordings by New Orleans trumpet pioneer Sharkey Bonano. From that time they issued a total of 86 discs.

== Discography ==
=== Timeless Records discography ===
Title	Artist	Year released	Catalogue No.	Notes
Eastern Rebellion	Cedar Walton	1976	SJP 101	
Ichi-Ban	Louis Hayes/Junior Cook Quintet	1976	SJP 102	
New True Illusion	Joanne Brackeen & Clint Houston	1978	SJP 103	
Soft Focus	Rick Laird	1976	SJP 104	
Drifting on a Reed	Rein De Graaff	1977	SJP 105	
Eastern Rebellion 2	Cedar Walton	1977	SJP 106	
Yellow Dolphin Street	Tete Montoliu	1977	SJP 107	
La Placita: Live in Willisau	Marion Brown Quartet	1977	SJP 108	
Dance of the Sun	Eddie Marshall	1977	SJP 109	
Meditation	George Coleman and Tete Montoliu	1977	SJP 110	
Secret Love	Tete Montoliu Trio	1977	SJP 111	
Mystified	Tom Grant	1978	SJP 112	
Close to the Edge	Gijs Hendriks	1978	SJP 113	
In My Prime Vol. 1	Art Blakey and The Jazz Messengers	1978	SJP 114	
AFT	Joanne Brackeen	1978	SJP 115	
Catalonian Folksongs	Tete Montoliu	1978	SJP 116	
Modal Soul	Rein De Graaff-Dick Vennik Quartet	1978	SJP 117	
In My Prime Vol. 2	Art Blakey and The Jazz Messengers	1978	SJP 118	
In Out and Around	Mike Nock Quartet	1978	SJP 119	
Live at the Muzeval	Lionel Hampton and His Band	1978	SJP 120	
The Jamfs are Coming!	Johnny Griffin/Art Taylor Quartet	1978	SJP 121	
Free Fair	Free Fair	1978	SJP 122	
Trinkets and Things	Joanne Brackeen & Ryo Kawasaki	1978	SJP 123	
Four on the Outside	Curtis Fuller	1978	SJP 124	
Articulation	Rodney Jones	1978	SJP 125	
The Rise of Atlantis	Carter Jefferson	1978	SJP 126	
Paradise Space Shuttle	George Adams Quintet	1979	SJP 127	
Reflections in Blue	Art Blakey and The Jazz Messengers	1979	SJP 128	
Amsterdam After Dark	George Coleman	1979	SJP 129	
New York Jazz	Rein De Graaff Quintet	1979	SJP 130	
Dom Rocket	Gijs Hendriks	1979	SJP 131	
Inside the Plain of The Elliptic	Clint Houston	1979	SJP 132	
Hamp in Haarlem	Lionel Hampton & His Giants of Jazz	1979	SJP 133	
Piano Solos	Mike Nock	1979	SJP 134	
No release identified			SJP 135	
Short Speech	Harry Verbeke Quartet	1980	SJP 136	
No release identified			SJP 137	
Live at the Keystone Corner	Tete Montoliu	1980	SJP 138	
Good Gravy	Teddy Edwards	1980	SJP 139	
Doin' It Again	Dave Liebman	1980	SJP 140	
Free Fair 2	Free Fair	1980	SJP 141	
Lionel Hampton All Star Band at Newport '78	Lionel Hampton	1980	SJP 142	
Eastern Rebellion 3	Cedar Walton	1980	SJP 143	
Gibraltar	Harry Verbeke/Rob Agerbeek Quartet	1980	SJP 144	
The Soldier	Billy Higgins	1980	SJP 145	
Feedles	Gijs Hendriks, Joe Diorio, Bert Van Erk & Michael Baird	1980	SJP 146	
Earth Beams	George Adams/Don Pullen Quartet	1980	SJP 147	
Dannie Richmond Plays Charles Mingus	Dannie Richmond and the Last Mingus Band	1981	SJP 148	
Intrioduction	Intrioduction	1981	SJP 149	
Live at Montreux and Northsea	Art Blakey and the Jazzmessengers Big Band	1981	SJP 150	
If They Only Knew	Dave Liebman	1981	SJP 151	
When You Feel The Love	Rodney Jones	1981	SJP 152	
Forgotten Man	Lou Donaldson	1981	SJP 153	
Life Line	George Adams-Don Pullen Quartet	1981	SJP 154	
Album of the Year	Art Blakey and the Jazz Messengers	1981	SJP 155	
North Sea High Lights	Intrioduction	1982	SJP 156/157	
Heart & Soul	Ron Carter/Cedar Walton Duo	1982	SJP 158	
Chasin' the Bird	Rein de Graaff	1982	SJP 159	
No release identified			SJP 160	
Machito and His Salsa Big Band 1982	Machito and His Salsa Big Band	1982	SJP 161	
My Funny Valentine	Rodney Jones/Tommy Flanagan Quartet	1982	SJP 162	
Outrageous	Lionel Hampton and His Big Band	1982	SJP 163	
Rerootin'	Henny Vonk	1982	SJP 164	
Oh-By the Way	Art Blakey and the Jazz Messengers	1982	SJP 165	
Melodic Excursions	George Adams & Don Pullen	1982	SJP 166	
Sun Games	Jazz Circle	1982	SJP 167	
Live at North Sea '82	Machito & His Salsa Big Band	1982	SJP 168	
Tristeza	Samba Trio	1983	SJP 169	
Hit the Road Again	Percy Mayfield with the Phillip Walker Blues Band	1983	SJP 170	
Darji Meets Hank Jones	Darji and Hank Jones	1983	SJP 171	
No release identified			SJP 172	
Seven Steps	Harry Verbeke and Rob Agerbeek Quartet	1983	SJP 173	
Arnett Cobb Live	Arnett Cobb	1983	SJP 174	
Made in Japan	Lionel Hampton and His Orchestra	1984	SJP 175	
Everything Happens to Me	Kirk Lightsey trio with Chet Baker	1984	SJP 176	
California Message	Benny Golson featuring Curtis Fuller	1984	SJP 177	
It's Timeless	Timeless All Stars	1982	SJP 178	
Misty Red	Red Garland	1982	SJP 179	
One More Mem'ry	Benny Golson Quintet featuring Curtis Fuller	1984	SJP 180	
City Gates	George Adams/Don Pullen Quartet	1983	SJP 181	
Timeless Heart	Timeless All Stars	1983	SJP 182	
Machito!!!	Machito & His Salsa Big Band	1983	SJP 183	
Eastern Rebellion 4	Cedar Walton	1984	SJP 184	
Swingin' the Forties with The Great Eight	The Great 8	1984	SJP 185/186	
Time Speaks	Benny Golson	1984	SJP 187	
Independence	Pierre Courbois	1984	SJP 188	
No release identified			SJP 189	
Cloud People	Rein De Graaff/Dick Vennik Quartet	1984	SJP 191	
Mr. B	Chet Baker Trio	1984	SJP 192	
No release identified			SJP 193	
No release identified			SJP 194	
Message from Belgrade	Markovic Gut Sextet	1984,	SJP 195	
Beaver is My Name	Beaver Harris Quartet	1984	SJP 196	
Reflexionen	Reflexionen	1984	SJP 199	
Batida	Batida	1984	SJP 200	
The One and Only	Herman Foster	1984	SJP 201	
Live in Bologna	Lou Donaldson	1984	SJP 202	
Trio	Debbie Poryes, Hein Van De Geyn and Hans Eykenaar	1984	SJP 203	
Curtis Fuller Meets Roma Jazz Trio	Curtis Fuller and the Roma Jazz Trio	1984	SJP 204	
Decisions	George Adams-Don Pullen Quartet	1984	SJP 205	
Switch	Trio Karel Boehlee	1984	SJP 206	
No album identified			SJP 207	
No album identified			SJP 208	
Four Seasons	Bobby Hutcherson	1985	SJP 210	
New Lands	Enrico Pieranunzi Trio	1985	SJP 211	
Teseract Complicity	Geoffrey McCab, Eddie Gómez, Bob Moses and Clyde Criner	1985	SJP 212	
Duo	Rein De Graaff and Koos Serierse	1985	SJP 213	
Brian Melvin's Night Food	Brian Melvin's Night Food	1985	SJP 214	
First Impression	Toon Roos Quartet	1985	SJP 215	
Jazz Bach	Eugen Cicero	1985	SJP 216	
Blue Night	Art Blakey and the Jazzmessengers	1985	SJP 217	
Juvia	Diederik Wissels and Steve Houben	1985	SJP 218	
Live at Montmartre	George Adams-Don Pullen Quartet	1985	SJP 219	
Heavy Duty	Rob van den Broeck Trio	1986	SJP 220	
Woody Shaw with the Tone Jansa Quartet	Woody Shaw and the Tone Jansa Quartet	1986	SJP 221	
Helsdingen Jazz	René van Helsdingen Trio	1986	SJP 222	
Cedar Walton	Cedar Walton	1986	SJP 223	
No album identified			SJP 224	
Sling Shot	Cees Slinger and Clifford Jordan	1986	SJP 225	
Frank Grasso Big Band	Frank Grasso Big Band	1986	SJP 226	
No album identified			SJP 227	
People Get Funny...	Eddie Harris	1986	SJP 228	
A Gentle Approach	Ellen H. Band	1986	SJP 229	
Plays Romantic Ballads	Harry Verbeke Quartet	1986	SJP 230	
Rhythm And Blues Showtime With St. Louis Kings Of Rhythm	St. Louis Kings of Rhythm	1987	SJP 231/232	
Chet Baker's Last Recording as Quartet	Chet Baker	1988	SJP 233	
Live	Reflexionen	1986	SJP 234	
This is For You, John	Benny Golson	1986	SJP 235	
No album identified			SJP 237	
Chet Baker Sings Again	Chet Baker	1986	SJP 238	
No album identified			SJP 239	
Up Front	David Williams	1987	SJP 240	
Dr. Chi	Tone Janša Quartet featuring Woody Shaw	1987	SJP 241	
Transparence	Philip Catherine	1987	SJP 242	
No album identified			SJP 243	
Eddie Who?	Eddie Harris	1987	SJP 244	
Terra Do Sul	Batida	1987	SJP 245	
Mo de Bo	Harry Verbeke/Carlo de Wijs Quartet	1987	SJP 246	
Live at the Widder Bar	Dorothy Donegan	1987	SJP 247	
No album identified			SJP 248	
Joe Meets the Rhythm Section	Horace Parlan, Rufus Reid, Al Harewood and Joe Van Enkhuizen	1987	SJP 249	
Dizzy Gillespie Meets Phil Woods Quintet	Dizzy Gillespie and the Phil Woods Quintet	1987	SJP 250	
As Time Goes By	Chet Baker	1987	SJP 251/252	
Africa	Pharoah Sanders	1988	SJP 253	
Milanka	Larry Schneider/Diederik Wissels Quartet	1987	SJP 254	
Rokoko Jazz II	Eugen Cicero	1987	SJP 255	
No album identified			SJP 256	
Temptation	Kirk Lightsey Trio	1987	SJP 257	
Jazz Street	Jaco Pastorius & Brian Melvin	1987	SJP 258	
Rifftide	Al Cohn	1988	SJP 259	
Bon Voyage	McCoy Tyner	1987	SJP 260	
No album identified			SJP 261	
Cool Cat	Chet Baker	1987	SJP 262	
No album identified			SJP 263	
No album identified			SJP 264	
No album identified			SJP 265	
No album identified			SJP 266	
No album identified			SJP 267	
Alone Together	Frits Landesbergen, Rein De Graaff, Harry Emmery & Eric Ineke	1987	SJP 268	
Heart of the Matter	Ben van den Dungen/Jarmo Hoogendijk Quintet	1987	SJP 269	
No album identified			SJP 270	
Don't Stop It!	Klaus Ignatzek Group	1987	SJP 271	
No album identified			SJP 272	
No album identified			SJP 273	
No album identified			SJP 274	
No album identified			SJP 275	
No album identified			SJP 276	
No album identified			SJP 277	
No album identified			SJP 278	
No album identified			SJP 279	
No album identified			SJP 280	
No album identified			SJP 281	
I Mean You	Oyez	1987	SJP 282	
Duo	Hank Jones & Red Mitchell	1987	SJP 283	
Lee's Keys Please	Cadence All Stars	1988	SJP 284	
Attitudes	Toon Roos Quartet	1988	SJP 285	
Solo Piano	Jasper Van't Hof	1989	SJP 286	
Lover Man	Archie Shepp	1989	SJP 287	
Ellington Ballads	Joe Van Enkhuizen & Horace Parlan	1989	SJP 288	
Live in Berlin	Eddie Harris	1989	SJP 289	
The Frame	Per Goldschmidt Quartet	1989	SJP 290	
Lazuli	Sam Rivers Quartet	1990	SJP 291	
Jacaranda	Klaus Ignatzek Group	1989	SJP 292	
Steve Gut & RTB Big Band	Steve Gut	1989	SJP 293	
Jubilee	Rein de Graaff-Dick Vennik Quartet & Sextet	1989	SJP 294	
No album identified			SJP 295	
No album identified			SJP 296	
No album identified			SJP 297	
Elliptic Dance	The Super Trio featuring Dezso Lakatos	1988	SJP 298	
Barlach Zyklus	Mikesch van Grümmer	1988,	SJP 299	
No album identified			SJP 300	
Jazz Poet	Tommy Flanagan	1989	SJP 301	
Bluebird	Dave Pike and Charles McPherson	1989	SJP 302	
Out of Nowhere	Dave Hancock Trio	1989	SJP 303	
Selena's Dance	Ronnie Mathews Trio	1989	SJP 304	
Electric Night	Future Shock	1989	SJP 305	
Tenor Conclave	Rein de Graaff Trio with Teddy Edwards, Buck Hill and Von Freeman	1989	SJP 306	
Feel the Wind	Freddie Hubbard and Art Blakey	1989	SJP 307	
Take It from the Top	Denise Jannah	1989	SJP 308	
Out Here	Rick Hollander Quartet	1990	SJP 309	
Jazznost: Joint Venture	The Soviet-American Jazz Quartet	1990	SJP 310	
Breakout	Papo Vazquez	1990	SJP 311	
Close Encounter of the Swingin' Kind	Dee Daniels, Johan Clement, Koos Wiltenburg and Fred Krens	1990	SJP 312	
A New Coat of Paint	John Slaughter Blues Band	1990	SJP 313	
Live at Café Praga	Steve Grossman	1990	SJP 314	
In Case You Missed It: Timeless 15th Anniversary Sampler	Various Artists	1991	SJP 315	
Straight Ahead	Carlo Atti Quartet	1991	SJP 316	
Night Dreamers	The Pete Magadini Quintet	1991	SJP 317	
Veradero Blues	Nueva Manteca	1991	SJP 318	
No album identified			SJP 319	
Live Lights	Entra Live	1991	SJP 320	
Dare to Be Different	Rinus Groeneveld Trio	1991	SJP 321	
Norwegian Wood	European Jazz Trio	1991	SJP 322	
Driftin	Bernhard Reinke Transfusion	1991	SJP 323	
New Surprise	Klaus Ignatzek Group	1991	SJP 324	
No Kiddin'	Surinam Music Ensemble	1991	SJP 325	
Moon Child	Pharoah Sanders	1991	SJP 326	
Dreamboat	Manhattan Projects	1991	SJP 327	
No More Tears (For Lady Day)	Mal Waldron	1991	SJP 328	
The Brilliant	Bill Evans	1991	SJP 329	
Young Men & Olds	Ed Thigpen	1991	SJP 330	
Consecration I	Bill Evans	1991	SJP 331	
Consecration II	Bill Evans	1991	SJP 332	
Recollections	Kenny Drew	1991	SJP 333	
Stardust	Harry Verbeke/Rob Agerbeek Quartet	1991	SJP 334	
Movie Themes from France	Barney Wilen with the Mal Waldron Trio	1991	SJP 335	
Orange City	European Jazz Trio	1991	SJP 336	
Nighttime Daydreams	Royce Campbell	1991	SJP 337	
No album identified			SJP 338	
My Favourite Roots	Cosmo Intini Jazz Set	1991	SJP 339	
Chippin' In	Art Blakey and His Jazz Messengers	1991	SJP 340	
Episode	Ahmad Mansour Quartet	1991	SJP 341	
Speak Up	Ben Van Den Dungen/Jarmo Hoogendijk Quintet	1991	SJP 342	
Fresh Fruit	Paul Hock	1991	SJP 343	
Oxiana	Ahmad Mansour	1991	SJP 344	
...And Then, There's This!	Jessica Williams	1991	SJP 345	
Treasure Chest	Joe Gilman Trio with Joe Henderson	1991	SJP 346	
I'll Get By	Greg Marvin	1991	SJP 347	
Taking Off	Greg Martin	1991	SJP 348	
Live at Paradox	The Houdini's	1991	SJP 349	
Beyond the Blue Bird	Tommy Flanagan	1991	SJP 350	
Blue Greens & Beans	David "Fathead" Newman, Marchel Ivery and the Rein de Graaff Trio	1991	SJP 351	
Beautiful Friendship	Peter Guidi	1991	SJP 352	
Roger's Living Room	The Oom Maw Maw	1991	SJP 353	
Be-Bop, Ballads & Blues	Rein De Graaff	1991	SJP 354	
Afrodisia	Nueva Manteca & Nicky Marrero	1991	SJP 355	
Blues Ahead	The Joe Vanenkhuizen Trio	1991	SJP 356	
Is That So?	John Hicks	1991	SJP 357	
Welcome to Love	Pharoah Sanders	1991	SJP 358	
D-Code	Ben Herman	1991	SJP 359	
Airmail Special	Bernard Berkhout's Swingmates	1991	SJP 360	
Changes in Time	Scapes	1991	SJP 361	
No album identified			SJP 362	
Bos & Van Bemmel	Bos & Van Bemmel	1991	SJP 363	
Major Step	Major Holley	1991	SJP 364	
Embraceable You	Leny Andrade	1991	SJP 365	
Heartbreak	Chet Baker	1991	SJP 366	
Altered Things	Eero Koivistoinen	1992	SJP 367	
The Man from Barcelona	Tete Montoliu Trio	1992	SJP 368	
You Must Believe in Spring	Jan Verwey	1992	SJP 369	
I Didn't Know About You	Archie Shepp	1992	SJP 370	
Run for Your Wife	Ben van den Dungen, Jarmo Hoogendijk Quintet	1992	SJP 371	
Body and Soul	Mat Murucci	1992	SJP 372	
Bird Still Lives! Volume 1	The Charlie Parker Memorial Band	1992	SJP 373	
Handclaps	Future Shock	1992	SJP 374	
Cultural Diversity	Steve Hobbs	1992	SJP 375	
Polder	Dick de Graaf Septet	1992	SJP 376	
Cabo Blanco, From a Distance...	Bernhard Reinke Transfusion	1992	SJP 377	
We the Cats shall Hep Ya	Jump'n Jive	1992	SJP 378	
Shadows	Gary Bartz	1992	SJP 379	
First Sight	Jarmo Savolainen	1992	SJP 380	
Passing the Bar	Chazz!	1992	SJP 381	
Headlines: The Houdini's in New York	The Houdini's	1992	SJP 382	
Cross-Eyed Cat	Rondo's Blues Deluxe	1992	SJP 383	
Soolmaan	Polo de Haas Quartet	1992	SJP 384	
On the Sunny Side of the Street	Harold Ashby	1992	SJP 385	
Black Ballads	Archie Shepp	1992	SJP 386	
Workin'	Nat Adderley Quintet	1992	SJP 387	
Howdy!	Bik Bent Braam	1992	SJP 388	
Gentle Breeze	Royce Campbell	1992	SJP 389	
Bassman's Basement	Lynn Seaton	1992	SJP 390	
No album identified			SJP 391	
Double Dribble	Miles Donahue	1992	SJP 392	
The Song Is You	Piet Noordijk Quartet	1993	SJP 393	
On the Scene	Jerry Van Rooijen With The Dutch Jazz Orchestra	1993	SJP 394	
Unified	Paulus Potters	1993	SJP 395	
Old Voices	Brian Melvin Trio	1993	SJP 396	
Here We Are	Jan Somers Band	1993	SJP 397	
Hommage à...	René Thomas	1993	SJP 398	
Plays Garcia Lorca	Caoutchouc	1993	SJP 399	
How Low Can You Go?	Various Artists	1993	SJP 400	
A Weaver of Dreams	Peter Guidi	1993	SJP 401	
Inside Out	David Janeway	1993	SJP 402	
Positively!	Dan Papaila	1993	SJP 403	
Penumbra	Ahmad Mansour	1993	SJP 404	
Kickin' in the Frontwindow	The Houdini's	1993	SJP 405	
Piccadilly Square	Carl Allen & Manhattan Projects	1993	SJP 406	
Live It Up	Rudy Linka	1993	SJP 407	
Natural Desire	Free Kick	1993	SJP 408	
Jazz 4 Jazz	Deborah Brown	1993	SJP 409	
Wheel Within a Wheel	Bernie Senensky	1993	SJP 410	
Uru	Sticks & Strings	1993	SJP 411	
Ya-It-Ma Thang	Niko Schäuble's Tibetan Dixie with Arthur Blythe	1993	SJP 412	
Big City Magic	Bruce Williamson	1993	SJP 413	
A Heart Full of Music	Denise Jannah	1993	SJP 414	
South of No North	Ugly White Belly	1993	SJP 415	
No album identified			SJP 416	
5 Up High	5 Up High	1994	SJP 417	
Waiting	Peter Hertmans Quartet	1994	SJP 418	
Ellington My Way	Joe Vanenkhuizen	1994	SJP 419	
Heartbeat	Dick de Graaf Septet	1994	SJP 420	
Live in Köln	Jamaaladeen Tacuma and Cornell Rochester Meet the Podium 3	1994	SJP 421	
Melange: Frits and Friends	Frits Landesbergen	1994	SJP 422	
The Argonauts	Paulus Potters	1994	SJP 423	
The Super Quartet	Louis Hayes & Company	1994	SJP 424	
Royal Flush	Bernard Berkhoutt '5'	1994	SJP 425	
Homeland	Bernie Senensky	1994	SJP 426	
I've Got the World on a String	Charlie Byrd Trio	1994	SJP 427	
Mr. C.T.	Steve Gut	1994	SJP 428	
Nostalgia	Rein De Graaff	1994	SJP 429	
Baritone Explosion!: Live at Nick's	The Rein De Graaff Trio with Ronnie Cuber and Nick Brignola	1994	SJP 431	
No album identified			SJP 432	
No album identified			SJP 433	
No album identified			SJP 434	
My Little Rolly	Oleg Plotnikov	1996	SJP 435	
Timeless Blues	Oscar Klein, Romano Mussolini, Karsten Gnettner, Charly Antolini	1996	SJP 436	
There'll Never Be Another You	Chet Baker and Philip Catherine	1997	SJP 437	
Under Your Skin	Bernhard Reinke's Roller Coaster	1997	SJP 438	
Something to Live For	Archie Shepp	1997	SJP 439	
The Passion In Jazz On Timeless	Various Artists	1997	SJP 440	
No album identified			SJP 441	
No album identified			SJP 442	
An American in Italy	Charlie Mariano Quartet	1998	SJP 443	
Mucho Pucho	Pucho & His Latin Soul Brothers	1998	SJP 444	
Silver in the Bronx	The Bronx Horns	1998	SJP 445	
In My Own Room	Fay Victor	1999	SJP 446	
In the Chet Baker Mood	Tom Kirkpatrick Trio	1999	SJP 447	
Con Alma: A Tribute to Dizzy Gillespie	Judy Rafat	1999	SJP 448	
New Horizons	Bernie Senensky Quintet	1999	SJP 449	
In Case You Missed It: Best of Timeless	Various Artists	2000	SJP 450	
Duets	Rein de Graaff	2000	SJP 451	
14 Pieces for Harp and Bass	Maria Harp	2000	SJP 452	
Love is a Golden Glue	Vandoorn	2001	SJP 453	
Darker Than Blue	Fay Victor	2001	SJP 454	
7 Ave South	Diana Perez	2002	SJP 455	
TwoLips from Holland	Ron McCroby with the Hans Mantel Trio	2002	SJP 456	
Fleur d'Ennui	Fapy Lafertin Quintet & Tim Kliphuis	2002	SJP 457	
Uncovered	Vandoorn	2002	SJP 458	
Segundo Ciclo	Daniel Diaz	2002	SJP 459	
After Hours: Live at De Pompoen	Sjoerd Dijkhuizen	2002	SJP 460	
The View	Adrienne West	2002	SJP 461	
Big Bizar Habit: Strings Only	Marc van Vugt featuring Ineke van Doorn	2002	SJP 462	
Sketches of Balkan	Stepko "Steve" Gut	2002	SJP 463	
Round Moonlight	Deborah J. Carter	2002	SJP 464	
Now Is the Time	Rein de Graaff	2002	SJP 465	
All Right!	Volker Bruder, Joachim Refardt, Adrie Braat, Bob Dekker	2002	SJP 466	
Sunday Sketches	Diana Perez	2003	SJP 467	
No album identified			SJP 468	
Girl-Talking! Live in Concert	Deborah J. Carter	2004	SJP 469	
The Vandoesburg Suite	Marc van Vugt	2005	SJP 470	
Confirmation	Rein de Graaff	2006	SJP 471	
No album identified			SJP 472	
Daytripper: A Beatles Tribute	Deborah J. Carter	2006	SJP 473	
Dawn	Marc Van Vugt, Ineke Vandoorn and the Metropole Orkest	2006	SJP 474	
This Crazy Town	Eriko Ishihara	2006	SJP 475	
No album identified			SJP 476	
Low Tide	Ineke Vandoorn and Jeroen Van Vliet	2006	SJP 477	
Destinos	Marialy Pacheco Trio	2008	SJP 478	
Thinking of You	Rein De Graaff Trio with Conte Candoli & Bob Cooper	2009	SJP 479	
Blue Notes & Red Shoes	Deborah J. Carter	2009	SJP 480	
Waiting for the Bora	Bernhard Reinke, Onno Witte and Wiro Mahieu	2010	SJP 481	
Ornithology	Rein de Graaff	2010	SJP 482	
No album identified			SJP 483	
Good Bait	Ferdinand Povel & Pete Christlieb with the Rein de Graaff Trio	2011	SJP 484	
Indian Summer	Rein de Graaff Trio meets Sam Most	2012	SJP 485	

=== Timeless Historical discography ===
- Sharkey Bonano (1928–1937) CBC1-001, 1991 (audio restoration by John R. T. Davis)
- Tempo King (1936–1937) CBC1-002, 1991 (audio restoration by John R. T. Davis )
- Fletcher Henderson and Louis Armstrong (1924–1925) CBC1-003
- Bing Crosby (1926–1932) CBC1-004
- Hot British Dance Bands (1925–1937) CBC1-005, 1991 (audio restoration by John R, liner notes Brian Rust)
- Coleman Hawkins (1934–1939) CBC-1006, 1992 (audio restoration by John R. T. Davis )
- Ethel Waters (1929–1939) CBC1-007
- Dick Robertson and Orchestra (1937–1939) CBC1-008, 1992 (audio restoration by John R. T. Davis, liner notes Brian Rust )
- Original Dixieland Band (1917–1921) CBC1-009, 1992 (audio restoration by John R. T. Davis, liner notes Brian Rust )
- Harlem Big Bands (1925–1931) CBC1-010, 1994 (audio restoration by John R. T. Davis, liner notes Richard B.Hadlock )
- Hoagy Carmichael (1927–1939) CBC-1011
- Willie the Lion Smith (1935–1937) CBC1-012, 1993 (audio restoration by John R. T. Davis, liner notes Keith Nichols )
- Bix Beiderbecke (1924–1925) CBC1-013
- New Orleans in the '20s CBC1-014, 1993 (audio restoration by John R. T. Davis, liner notes Richard M. Sudhalter)
- Johnny Dodds and Jimmy Blythe (1926–1928) CBC1-015, 1993 (audio restoration by John R. T. Davis, liner notes Pim Gras)
- Teddy Grace (1937–1940) CBC1-016, 1993 (audio restoration by John R. T. Davis, liner notes David W. McCain)
- Goofus Five (1926–1927) CBC1-017, 1994 (audio restoration by John R. T. Davis, liner notes Brian Rust)
- Mound City Blue Blowers (1935–1936) CBC1-018, 1994 (audio restoration by John R. T. Davis, liner notes Brian Rust)
- Red McKenzie (1935–1936) CBC1-019, 1994 (audio restoration by John R. T. Davis, liner notes Digby Fairweather)
- Jazz Goes to the Movies (1930–1940) CBC1-020
- Jazz from the Windy City (1927–1930) CBC1-021
- Tiny Parham (1928–1930) CBC1-022, 1996 (audio restoration by John R. T. Davis, liner notes Brian Rust)
- Putney Dandridge (1935–1936) CBC1-023
- Eddie Condon CBC1-024, 1995 (audio restoration by John R. T. Davis, liner notes Richard M. Sudhalter)
- Charlie Shavers and the Blues Singers (1938–1939) CBC1-025
- The '30s Girls CBC1-026, 1995 (audio restoration by John R. T. Davis, liner notes Sally-Ann Worsford)
- The Compositions of Jelly Roll Morton CBC1-027
- Young Sidney Bechet CBC1-028
- Cotton Pickers CBC1-029
- Big Charlie Thomas CBC1-030, 1996 (audio restoration by John R. T. Davis, liner notes John R. T. Davis)
- Georgia Melodians CBC1-031
- Boyd Senter CBC1-032, 1996 (audio restoration by John R. T. Davis, liner notes Brian Rust)
- Jazz in Texas CBC1-033, 1996 (audio restoration by John R. T. Davis, liner notes Brian Rust)
- Jazz in California CBC1-034, 1997 (audio restoration by John R. T. Davis, liner notes Brian Rust)
- Ragtime to Jazz Vol.1 CBC1-035, 1997 (audio restoration by John R. T. Davis, liner notes Brian Rust)
- Jazz in St. Louis CBC1-036, 1997 (audio restoration by John R. T. Davis, liner notes Brian Rust)
- Little Ramblers, The CBC1-037, 1997 (audio restoration by John R. T. Davis, liner notes Hans Eekhoff)
- Jazz from Atlanta CBC1-038, 1997 (audio restoration by John R. T. Davis, liner notes Hans Eekhoff)
- Ruben Reeves – The Complete Vocalions CBC1-039
- Charleston Chasers Vol. 1 (1925–1930) CBC1-040, 1999 (audio restoration by John R. T. Davis, liner notes Hans Eekhoff)
- The Benson Orchestra of Chicago - The Chicago Hot Bands CBC1-041
- Goofus Five (1924–1925) CBC1-042, 2000 (audio restoration by John R. T. Davis, liner notes Marc Berresford)
- Eddie Lang – The Quintessential Eddie Lang CBC1-043, (audio restoration by John R. T. Davis, liner notes Sally-Ann Worsford)
- George Chisholm - Early Days CBC1-044, 1998 (audio restoration by John R. T. Davis, liner notes Campbell Burnap)
- Ragtime to Jazz Vol.2 CBC1-045, 1997 (audio restoration by John R. T. Davis, liner notes Marc Berresford)
- First Days of Jazz CBC1-046
- The Rhythm Rascals, Swing Rhythm Boys, Sid Phillips CBC1-047
- Jazz Is Where You Find It CBC1-048, 1998 (audio restoration by John R. T. Davis, liner notes Brian Rust)
- Original Memphis Five CBC1-049
- Alex Hill - Ain't It Nice? CBC1-050, 1998 (audio restoration by John R. T. Davis, liner notes Sally-Ann Worsford)
- Glenn Miller's G.I.'s in Paris CBC1-051, 1998 (audio restoration by John R. T. Davis, liner notes Tony Baldwin)
- California Ramblers (1925–1928) CBC1-053, 1999 (audio restoration by John R. T. Davis, liner notes Hans Eekhoff)
- Alex Hill – Keep a Song in Your Soul! CBC1-054, 1998 (audio restoration by John R. T. Davis, liner notes Sally-Ann Worsford)
- Brunswick/Vocalion - Odds & Bits CBC1-055, 1999 (audio restoration by John R. T. Davis, liner notes Hans Eekhoff)
- Clarence Williams & His Orchestra Vol. 1 (1933–1934) CBC1-056
- Clarence Williams & His Orchestra Vol. 2 (1933–1937) CBC1-057
- Bernie Cummins & his Orchestra (1924–1930) CBC1-058, 2000 (audio restoration by John R. T. Davis, liner notes Marc Berresford)
- Abe Lyman & his Orchestra CBC1-059, 2001 (audio restoration by John R. T. Davis, liner notes by Ate van Delden)
- Bands of Vic Meyers (1923–1929) Vick Myers (1925–1926) CBC1-060, 2000 (audio restoration by Hans Eekhoff, liner notes Ate van Delden)
- Fred Elizalde – Jazz In California CBC1-061, 2000 (audio restoration by Hans Eekhoff, liner notes Ate van Delden)
- Varsity Eight CBC1-062, 2000 (audio restoration by Hans Eeekhoff, liner notes Ate van Delden)
- Those Fabulous Gennetts Vol. 1 (1923–1925) CBC1-063, 2000 (audio restoration by Hans Eekhoff, liner notes Ate van Delden)
- Fletcher Henderson – The Harmony & Vocalion Sessions (1925–1927) CBC1-064, 2000 (audio restoration by John R. T. Davis, liner notes Marc Berresford)
- Benny Goodman – (1931–1935) CBC1065, 2000 (audio restoration by John R. T. Davis, liner notes Tony Russell)
- Ray Miller and His Brunswick Orchestra (1924–1929) CBC1-066
- Isham Jones and His Orchestra (1922–1926) CBC1-067
- Tight Women & Loose Bands (1921–1931) CBC1-068
- Fletcher Henderson – The Harmony & Vocalion Sessions (1927–1928) Vol. 2 CBC1-069, 2001 (audio restoration by John R. T. Davis, liner notes Marc Berresford)
- From Ragtime to Jazz – Vol. 3 (1902–1923) CBC1-070
- Early Chicago Jazz Vol. 1 (1923–1925) CBC1-071, 2002 (audio restoration by Hans Eekhoff, liner notes Ate van Delden)
- Early Victor Electric Hot Dance Bands CBC1-072, 2004 (audio restoration by John R. T. Davis, liner notes Marc Berresford)
- Perry Bradford – "A Panorama" (1923–1927) CBC1-073, 2005 (audio restoration by John R. T. Davis, liner notes Marc Berresford)
- Ted Lewis & HIS BAND 1929-1934 CBC1-074, 2002 (audio restoration by John R. T. Davis, liner notes Marc Berresford)
- Early Chicago Jazz Vol. 2 (1923–1928) CBC1-076, 2002 (audio restoration by Hans Eekhoff, liner notes Ate van Delden)
- The Complete Ladd's Black Aces 1921–1924 CBC1-077, 2003 (audio restoration by John R. T. Davis, liner notes Marc Berresford)
- Jazz on America's West Coast 1924–1930 CBC1-078, 2003 (audio restoration by Hans Eekhoff, liner notes Ate van Delden)
- The Herb Wiedoeft/Jesse Stafford Orchestra 1922–1930 CBC1-079, 2002 (audio restoration by Hans Eekhoff, liner notes Ate van Delden)
- Those Fabulous Gennetts Vol. 2 (1922–1925) CBC1-080, 2000 (audio restoration by Hans Eekhoff, liner notes Ate van Delden)
- Charleston Chasers Vol. 2 (1928–1930) CBC1-081, 2001 (audio restoration by John R. T. Davis, liner notes Ate van Delden)
- Jean Goldkette 1924–1929 CBC1-084
- From Ragtime to Jazz – Vol.4 (1896–1922) CBC1-085
- Americans in Holland CBC1-086
- Roll Up the Carpets – "Everybody Dance" CBC1-087
- The Young Benny Goodman 1928–1931 CBC1-088, 2005 (audio restoration by Hans Eekhoff, liner notes Ate van Delden)
- Ben Selvin 1924–1926 CBC1-089, 2005 (audio restoration by Hans Eekhoff, liner notes Ate van Delden)
- Adrian Rollini and the Golden Gate Orchestra 1924–1927 CBC1-090
- Pathé & Cameo Jazzbands 1921–1928 CBC1-091, 2007 (audio restoration by Hans Eekhoff, liner notes Ate van Delden)
- Paul Whiteman 1920–1927 CBC1-093
- Americans in Holland Vol. 2 CBC1-095
