= İlhan Mimaroğlu =

- Born: March 11, 1926; Istanbul, Turkey
- Origin: Turkish
- Died: July 17, 2012 (aged 86) Manhattan, New York, U.S.
- Genres: Contemporary, Electronic
- Occupation: Composer
- Labels: Finnadar; Atlantic Records

İlhan Kemaleddin Mimaroğlu (Turkish pronunciation: [ˈilhan mimaɾˈoːɫu], March 11, 1926 – July 17, 2012) was a Turkish American musician and electronic music composer.

== Biography ==
He was born in Istanbul, Turkey, the son of the famous architect Mimar Kemaleddin Bey depicted on the Turkish lira banknotes, denomination 20 lira, of the 2009 E-9 emission. He graduated from Galatasaray High School in 1945 and the Ankara Law School in 1949. He went to study in New York supported by a Rockefeller Scholarship. He studied musicology at Columbia University under Paul Henry Lang and composition under Douglas Moore. He published articles in the Forum magazine in the 1950s.

During the 1960s, he studied in the Columbia-Princeton Electronic Center under Vladimir Ussachevsky and on occasions worked with Edgard Varèse and Stefan Wolpe. His notable students included Ingram Marshall.

He worked as a producer for Atlantic Records, where he created his own record label, Finnadar Records, in 1971. In the same year he collaborated with trumpeter Freddie Hubbard on an anti-war statement, Sing Me a Song of Songmy. He also was the producer for Charles Mingus’ Changes One and Changes Two, and contributed to the soundtrack of Federico Fellini's Fellini Satyricon.

He was awarded the Guggenheim Fellowship in music composition in 1971.

İlhan Mimaroğlu died of pneumonia in 2012.

== Discography ==
=== For acoustic instruments ===
Albums for solo piano produced by İlhan Mimaroğlu under the Finnadar label:

- Meral Guneyman plays the piano music of Frank Bridge, Anton Webern and Abel Decaux “one of year’s five best” (Fanfare Magazine, Peter Rabinowitz)
- September Moon, a Nocturnal Seascape for orchestra
- Antistrophes for flute and piano
- Deformations for clarinet and piano
- Idols of Perversity for solo viola and string ensemble (1974)
- Monologlar (Monologue) for clarinet and viola (1997)
- Monologue I for unaccompanied clarinet
- Monologue II for unaccompanied violin
- Monologue III for unaccompanied English horn
- Üç parça (1952)
- Pieces Sentimentales for piano
- Anı ve Günce Sonatı for piano
- Rosa for piano (1978)
- Valses ignobles et sentencieuses for piano (World Premiere by Meral Guneyman, pianist, Merkin Hall, New York City, 1986)dedicated to Meral Guneyman
- Yaylı dördüller
- Yaylı çalgılar için gece ezgileri
- Sessions for piano (1977)
- String Quartet No.4 "Like There's Tomorrow", with voice obbligato (Janis Siegel, Vocals)
- Three Pieces for Piano (a) Prelude (b) Waltz (c) Boogie (Finnadar Records) (Musiques Noires-Meral Guneyman, piano solo)

=== Magnetic tape ===
Most of these works utilize concrete sounds, but there are also occasional electronic elements.

- Görsel Çalışma (1965)
- Agony (1964)
- Preludes for magnetic tape (1966–1976)
- Music for Jean Dubuffet's Coucou Bazar (1973)
- Le Tombeau d'Edgar A. Poe (1964)
- Intermezzo (1964)
- Bowery Bum (1964)
- Wings of the Delirious Demon (1969)
- To Kill a Sunrise (1974)
- Tract, a composition of Agitprop Music for electromagnetic tape (1975) (Folkways Records)
- To Kill a Sunrise and La Ruche (1976) (Folkways Records)
- The Offering for tape with pre-recorded voice (Finnadar Records)

=== Acoustic plus electronic sounds (Tape) ===
- Still Life 1980 for cello and tape (Finnadar & Atlantic Records)
- Music Plus One for violin and tape (Finnadar & Atlantic Records)
- Sing Me a Song of Songmy (1971)
- Immolation Scene for voice and tape (1983) (Finnadar & Atlantic Records)
