= Dannie Richmond =

American drummer (1931–1988)

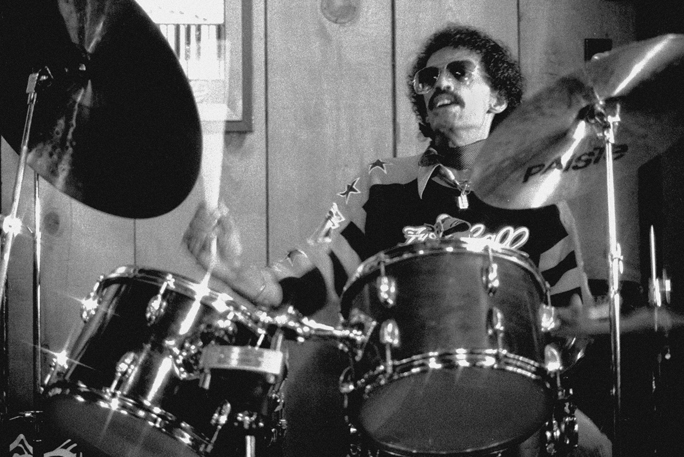
- Richmond at Half Moon Bay, California; June 23, 1981

Background information
- Born: Charles Daniel Richmond; December 15, 1931; New York City, New York, U.S.
- Died: March 16, 1988 (aged 56) Harlem, New York
- Genres: Jazz, R&B, pop
- Occupations: Musician, music director, bandleader
- Instrument: Drums
- Years active: 1955–1988
- Labels: Impulse!, Timeless, Landmark

Charles Daniel Richmond (December 15, 1931 – March 16, 1988) was an American jazz drummer who is best known for his work with Charles Mingus. He also worked with Joe Cocker, Elton John and Mark-Almond.

== Life and career ==
Richmond was born Charles Daniel Richmond on December 15, 1931, in New York City and grew up in Greensboro, North Carolina. He started playing tenor saxophone at the age of thirteen, and went on to play R&B with the Paul Williams band in 1955.

His career took off when he took up the drums, which he had taught himself to play in his early twenties, through the formation of what was to be a 21-year association with Charles Mingus. Mingus biographer Brian Priestley writes that "Dannie became Mingus's equivalent to Harry Carney in the Ellington band, an indispensable ingredient of 'the Mingus sound' and a close friend as well". That association continued after Mingus' death when Richmond became the first musical director of the group Mingus Dynasty in 1980.

== Death ==
He died of a heart attack in Harlem on March 16, 1988, at the age of 56.

== Discography ==
=== As leader ===
- 1965: "In" Jazz for the Culture Set (Impulse!)
- 1979: Ode to Mingus (Soul Note)
- 1980: Hand to Hand (Soul Note) with George Adams
- 1980: Dannie Richmond Plays Charles Mingus (Timeless)
- 1980: The Last Mingus Band A.D. (Landmark) originally released as Dannie Richmond Quintet (Gatemouth)
- 1981: Three or Four Shades of Dannie Richmond Quintet (Tutu) released 1991
- 1983: Gentleman's Agreement (Soul Note) with George Adams
- 1983: Dionysius (Red)

=== As sideman ===
==== With Charles Mingus ====
- The Clown (Atlantic, 1957)
- Mingus Three (Jubilee, 1957)
- Tijuana Moods (RCA Victor, 1957)
- East Coasting (Bethlehem, 1957)
- Jazz Portraits: Mingus in Wonderland (United Artists, 1959)
- Blues & Roots (Atlantic, 1959 [1960])
- Mingus Ah Um (Columbia, 1959)
- Mingus Dynasty (Columbia, 1959)
- Pre-Bird (Mercury, 1960)
- Mingus at Antibes (Atlantic, 1960 [1976])
- Charles Mingus Presents Charles Mingus (Candid, 1960)
- Mingus (Candid, 1960 [1961])
- Reincarnation of a Lovebird (Candid, 1960 [1988])
- Oh Yeah (Atlantic, 1961 [1962])
- Tonight at Noon (Atlantic, 1957/61 [1964])
- The Complete Town Hall Concert (Blue Note, 1962 [1994])
- The Black Saint and the Sinner Lady (Impulse!, 1963)
- Mingus Mingus Mingus Mingus Mingus (Impulse!, 1963)
- The Cornell Concert (Blue Note, 1964 [2007])
- Town Hall Concert (Jazz Workshop, 1964)
- Revenge! (Revenge, 1964 [1996])
- The Great Concert of Charles Mingus (America, 1964 [1971])
- Mingus in Europe Volume I (Enja, 1964 [1980])
- Mingus in Europe Volume II (Enja, 1964 [1983])
- Right Now: Live at the Jazz Workshop (Fantasy, 1964 [1966])
- Mingus at Monterey (Jazz Workshop, 1964)
- My Favorite Quintet (Jazz Workshop, 1965 [1966])
- Music Written for Monterey 1965 (Jazz Workshop, 1965)
- Charles Mingus in Paris: The Complete America Session (Sunnyside, 1970 [2006]) originally released as Blue Bird and Pithycanthropus Erectus
- Charles Mingus Sextet In Berlin (Beppo, 1970)
- Let My Children Hear Music (Columbia, 1971)
- Mingus Moves (Atlantic, 1973)
- Changes One (Atlantic, 1973)
- Changes Two (Atlantic, 1973)
- Mingus at Carnegie Hall (Atlantic, 1974)
- Cumbia & Jazz Fusion (Atlantic, 1976)
- Me, Myself an Eye (Atlantic, 1978)
- Something Like a Bird (Atlantic, 1978)

==== With George Adams and Don Pullen ====
- Jazz a Confronto 21 (Horo, 1975)
- All That Funk (Palcoscenico, 1979)
- More Funk (Palcoscenico, 1979)
- Don't Lose Control (Soul Note, 1979)
- Earth Beams (Timeless, 1981)
- Life Line (Timeless, 1981)
- City Gates (Timeless, 1983)
- Live at the Village Vanguard (Soul Note, 1983)
- Live at the Village Vanguard Vol. 2 (Soul Note, 1983)
- Decisions (Timeless, 1984)
- Live at Montmartre (Timeless, 1985)
- Breakthrough (Blue Note, 1986)
- Song Everlasting (Blue Note, 1987)

With Pepper Adams

- Pepper Adams Plays the Compositions of Charlie Mingus (Workshop Jazz, 1964)

==== With others ====
With Ray Anderson

- Old Bottles - New Wine (Enja, 1985)

With Chet Baker

- (Chet Baker Sings) It Could Happen to You (1958)

With Ted Curson

- Plenty of Horn (Old Town, 1961)

With Booker Ervin

- The Book Cooks (Bethlehem, 1960)
- Cookin' (Savoy, 1960)

With Ricky Ford

- Loxodonta Africana (New World, 1977)
- Manhattan Plaza (Muse, 1978)

With Bert Jansch

- Moonshine (1973)

With John Jenkins

- Jenkins, Jordan and Timmons (Prestige, 1957) – with Clifford Jordan and Bobby Timmons
- John Jenkins with Kenny Burrell (Blue Note, 1957) – with Kenny Burrell

With Duke Jordan

- Tivoli One (SteepleChase, 1978, [1984])
- Tivoli Two (SteepleChase, 1978, [1984])
- Wait and See (SteepleChase, 1978 [1994])

With Jimmy Knepper

- A Swinging Introduction to Jimmy Knepper (Bethlehem 1957)
- Cunningbird (SteepleChase, 1976)

With Horace Parlan

- Blue Parlan (Steeplechase, 1978)
- Like Someone in Love (Steeplechase, 1983)

With Herbie Nichols

- Love, Gloom, Cash, Love (1957)

With Sahib Shihab

- The Jazz We Heard Last Summer (Savoy, 1957)

With Zoot Sims

- Down Home (Bethlehem, 1960)

With Mal Waldron

- What It Is (Enja, 1981)

With Bennie Wallace

- Mystic Bridge (Enja, 1982)
