= Charles Mingus discography =

As a bandleader, the American jazz bassist Charles Mingus released 51 albums between 1949 and 1977; as a sideman, Mingus appeared on a total of 34 albums.

Four albums of his music were released posthumously between 1979 and 1990. Between 1979 and 2015, Sue Mingus produced 19 albums based on his compositions.

== Discography as bandleader ==
=== Studio albums ===
| Year | Title | Label, Release Year | Date (last session) | Notes |
|---|---|---|---|---|
| 1953 | Strings and Keys | Debut | April 1, 1951 | with Spaulding Givens |
| 1953 | Miss Bliss | Debut | October 28, 1953 | EP |
| 1955 | Jazzical Moods, Volume 1 | Period | December 1, 1954 | with John LaPorta; Partially included in The Jazz Experiments of Charlie Mingus (Bethlehem, 1955) |
| 1955 | Jazzical Moods, Volume 2 | Period | December 1, 1954 | with John LaPorta; Included in The Jazz Experiments of Charlie Mingus (Bethlehem, 1955) |
| 1956 | Jazz Composers Workshop | Savoy | January 30, 1955 | |
| 1956 | Pithecanthropus Erectus | Atlantic | January 30, 1956 | |
| 1957 | The Clown | Atlantic | March 12, 1957 | |
| 1957 | Mingus Three | Jubilee | July 9, 1957 | AKA Trio |
| 1957 | East Coasting | Bethlehem | August 16, 1957 | |
| 1959 | A Modern Jazz Symposium of Music and Poetry | Bethlehem | October 1, 1957 | |
| 1959 | Mingus Ah Um | Columbia | May 12, 1959 | |
| 1960 | Mingus Dynasty | Columbia | November 13, 1959 | Companion album to Mingus Ah Um (Columbia, 1959) |
| 1960 | Blues & Roots | Atlantic | February 4, 1959 | |
| 1961 | Charles Mingus Presents Charles Mingus | Candid | October 20, 1960 | |
| 1961 | Newport Rebels | Candid | November 11, 1960 | Jazz Artists Guild led by Charles Mingus and Max Roach |
| 1961 | Mingus | Candid | November 11, 1960 | |
| 1961 | Pre-Bird | Mercury | May 25, 1960 | AKA Mingus Revisited |
| 1962 | Tijuana Moods | RCA | August 6, 1957 | |
| 1962 | Oh Yeah | Atlantic | November 6, 1961 | |
| 1963 | The Black Saint and the Sinner Lady | Impulse! | January 20, 1963 | Vinyl pressings reissued by Universal Music Group in collaboration with Chad Kassem's Analogue Productions |
| 1964 | Tonight at Noon | Atlantic | November 6, 1961 | |
| 1964 | Mingus Plays Piano | Impulse! | July 30, 1963 | |
| 1964 | Mingus Mingus Mingus Mingus Mingus | Impulse! | September 20, 1963 | Vinyl pressings reissued by Universal Music Group in collaboration with Chad Kassem's Analogue Productions |
| 1971 | Blue Bird | America | October 31, 1970 | Included in Charles Mingus in Paris: The Complete America Session (Sunnyside, 2006) |
| 1971 | Pithycanthropus Erectus | America | October 31, 1970 | Included in Charles Mingus in Paris: The Complete America Session (Sunnyside, 2006) |
| 1971 | Charles Mingus with Orchestra | Columbia | January 14, 1971 | |
| 1972 | Let My Children Hear Music | Columbia | November 18, 1971 | |
| 1974 | Mingus Moves | Atlantic | October 31, 1973 | |
| 1975 | Changes One | Atlantic | December 30, 1974 | |
| 1975 | Changes Two | Atlantic | December 30, 1974 | |
| 1978 | Cumbia & Jazz Fusion | Atlantic | March 10, 1977 | |
| 1977 | Three or Four Shades of Blues | Atlantic | March 29, 1977 | |
| 1977 | Lionel Hampton Presents Charles Mingus | Who's Who in Jazz | November 6, 1977 | AKA His Final Work |
| 1988 | Reincarnation of a Lovebird | Candid | November 11, 1960 | |
| 1990 | Mysterious Blues | Candid | November 11, 1960 | |
| 2016 | Shadows | DOL | November 1, 1958 | Movie Soundtrack. Partially re-used for Mingus in Wonderland (United Artists, 1959) |

=== Live albums ===
| | Title | Label, Release Year | Date (last session) | Notes |
|---|---|---|---|---|
| 1956 | Mingus at the Bohemia | Debut | December 23, 1955 | AKA Chazz! |
| 1959 | Jazz Portraits: Mingus in Wonderland | United Artists | January 16, 1959 | |
| 1962 | Town Hall Concert | United Artists | October 12, 1962 | Expanded in The Complete Town Hall Concert (Blue Note, 1994) |
| 1963 | The Charles Mingus Quintet & Max Roach | Fantasy | December 23, 1955 | |
| 1964 | Town Hall Concert | Jazz Workshop | April 4, 1964 | Expanded in The Jazz Workshop Concerts 1964–65 (Mosaic, 2012) |
| 1965 | Mingus at Monterey | Jazz Workshop | September 20, 1964 | Included in The Jazz Workshop Concerts 1964–65 (Mosaic, 2012) |
| 1966 | My Favorite Quintet | Jazz Workshop | May 13, 1965 | Expanded in The Jazz Workshop Concerts 1964–65 (Mosaic, 2012) |
| 1966 | Music Written for Monterey 1965 | Jazz Workshop | September 25, 1965 | |
| 1966 | Right Now: Live at the Jazz Workshop | Fantasy | June 3, 1964 | |
| 1971 | The Great Concert of Charles Mingus | America | April 19, 1964 | |
| 1973 | Charles Mingus and Friends in Concert | Columbia | February 4, 1972 | |
| 1973 | The Greatest Jazz Concert Ever | Prestige | May 15, 1953 | 2xLP; compiles the three 10" volumes of Jazz at Massey Hall |
| 1974 | Mingus at Carnegie Hall | Atlantic | January 19, 1974 | |
| 1976 | Mingus at Antibes | Atlantic | July 13, 1960 | AKA Charles Mingus Live with Eric Dolphy |
| 1979 | Mingus in Europe Volume I | Enja | April 26, 1964 | |
| 1981 | Mingus in Europe Volume II | Enja | April 26, 1964 | |
| 1985 | Concertgebouw Amsterdam Vol. 1 | Ulysse Musique | April 10, 1964 | Included in The Jazz Workshop Concerts 1964–65 (Mosaic, 2012) and In Amsterdam 1964 (DIW, 1989) |
| 1986 | Concertgebouw Amsterdam Vol. 2 | Ulysse Musique | April 10, 1964 | Included in The Jazz Workshop Concerts 1964–65 (Mosaic, 2012) and In Amsterdam 1964 (DIW, 1989) |
| 1988 | In Paris 1970 | Ulysse Musique | October 28, 1970 | |
| 1989 | Live in Chateauvallon, 1972 | France's Concert | August 22, 1972 | |
| 1989 | In Amsterdam 1964 | DIW | April 10, 1964 | compiles Concertgebouw Amsterdam Vol. 1 (Ulysse Musique, 1985), Concertgebouw Amsterdam Vol. 2 (Ulysse Musique, 1986) |
| 1990 | Live in Oslo 1964 | Polydor | April 12, 1964 | |
| 1996 | Revenge! The Legendary Paris Concerts | Revenge | April 17, 1964 | |
| 2007 | Cornell 1964 | Blue Note | March 18, 1964 | with Eric Dolphy |
| 2015 | Live in Europe 1975 | Salvo | | |
| 2017 | Complete Live at the Bohemia | Essential Jazz Classics | | |
| 2018 | Jazz in Detroit / Strata Concert Gallery / 46 Selden | BBE | February 13, 1973 | |
| 2018 | Live at Montreaux | Eagle Rock | July 20, 1975 | |
| 2020 | @ Bremen 1964 & 1975 | Sunnyside | July 9, 1975 | |
| 2022 | The Lost Album from Ronnie Scott's | Resonance | August 15, 1972 | |

=== Compilations ===
| Year | Title | Label | Notes |
|---|---|---|---|
| 1967 | Jazz Experiment | Jazztone/Bethlehem | compiles Jazzical Moods, Vol. 1 & Jazzical Moods, Vol. 2; AKA The Jazz Experiments of Charlie Mingus, AKA Charlie Mingus, AKA Jazzical Moods, AKA Intrusions, AKA Minor Intrusions, AKA Abstractions |
| 1970 | The Best of Charles Mingus | Atlantic | |
| 1972 | The Candid Recordings – Featuring: Eric Dolphy | Barnaby | |
| 1973 | Reevaluation: The Impulse Years | ABC/Impulse! | 2xLP |
| 1973 | The Art of Charles Mingus (The Atlantic Years) | Atlantic | 2xLP |
| 1979 | Nostalgia in Times Square | Columbia | New edits and unreleased takes of Mingus Ah Um, and Mingus Dynasty |
| 1986 | The Young Rebel | Swingtime | |
| 1987 | The Rarest on Debut | Mythic Sound/Debut (Italy) | MSLP 001 |
| 1987 | The Rarest on Debut: Charles Mingus Sideman | Mythic Sound/Debut (Italy) | MSLP 002 |
| 1987 | The Rarest on Debut – Mingus Newly Discovered | Mythic Sound/Debut (Italy) | MSLP 003 |
| 1992 | Debut Rarities, Volume 1 | Original Jazz Classics | |
| 1992 | Debut Rarities, Volume 2 | Original Jazz Classics | |
| 1992 | Original Faubus Fables | All That's Jazz (Europe) | bootleg |
| 1993 | Debut Rarities, Volume 3 | Original Jazz Classics | |
| 1993 | Thirteen Pictures: The Charles Mingus Anthology | Rhino | 2xCD |
| 1994 | Debut Rarities, Volume 4 | Original Jazz Classics | |
| 1996 | Fables of Faubus | Giants of Jazz (Europe) | bootleg |
| 1998 | Alternate Takes | Columbia | |
| 2000 | West Coast 1945–49 | Uptown | |
| 2000 | Ken Burns Jazz | Columbia | |
| 2001 | The Very Best of Charles Mingus | Rhino | |
| 2006 | Charles Mingus & Booker Ervin – The Savoy Recordings | Brilliant Jazz (Netherlands) | 2xCD |
| 2006 | Charles Mingus in Paris: The Complete America Session | Sunnyside | Blue Bird (America, 1971), Pithycanthropus Erectus (America, 1971) plus extra takes |
| 2006 | Take the 'A' Train | Back Up (Portugal) | |
| 2009 | Jazz Workshop 1957–1958 | Fresh Sound | 2xCD; compiles East Coasting and A Modern Jazz Symposium of Music and Poetry |
| 2009 | The Clown / Intrusion / Pithecanthropus Erectus | Delta | 2xCD |
| 2010 | Charles Mingus and the Newport Rebels | Candid (Europe) | |
| 2013 | The Quintessence New York – Los Angeles 1947–1960 | Frémeaux & Associés (France) | 2xCD |
| 2014 | Mingus Moods | Proper Box | |
| 2017 | Milestones of a Legend | Documents | |
| 2017 | The Eldridge Session | Doxy | |
| 2018 | Candid Recordings, Part One | Doxy | |
| 2018 | Candid Recordings, Part Two | Doxy | |
| 2018 | Newport Rebels | Jazz Images | |

=== Box sets ===
| Year | Title | Label | Notes |
|---|---|---|---|
| 1979 | Passions of a Man: An Anthology of His Atlantic Recordings | Atlantic | 3xLP |
| 1985 | The Complete Candid Recordings of Charles Mingus | Mosaic | 4xLP; 3xCD (1989) |
| 1990 | The Complete Debut Recordings | Debut | 12xCD |
| 1993 | The Complete 1959 CBS Charles Mingus Sessions | Mosaic | 4xLP |
| 1997 | Passions of a Man: The Complete Atlantic Recordings 1956–1961 | Rhino | 6xCD; Pithecanthropus Erectus (Atlantic, 1956), Word from Bird (Atlantic, 1958), The Clown (Atlantic, 1957), Tonight at Noon (Atlantic, 1964), Blues & Roots (Atlantic, 1960), Mingus At Antibes (Atlantic, 1976), Oh Yeah (Atlantic, 1962) |
| 1998 | The Complete 1959 Columbia Recordings | Columbia/Legacy | 3xCD; reissue of The Complete 1959 CBS Charles Mingus Sessions |
| 2001 | Charles Mingus Trilogy (The Complete Bethlehem Jazz Collection) | Avenue Jazz | 3xCD; compiles The Jazz Experiments of Charlie Mingus (Bethlehem, 1955), A Modern Jazz Symposium of Music And Poetry (Bethlehem, 1959), East Coasting (Bethlehem, 1957) |
| 2002 | 80th Birthday Celebration | Debut | 3xCD |
| 2004 | The Young Rebel | Proper | 4xCD; compiles Pacific Coast Blues, Inspiration, Inspiration, and Bass-Ically Speaking |
| 2012 | The Complete Columbia & RCA Albums Collection | Columbia/Legacy | 10xCD |
| 2012 | The Jazz Workshop Concerts 1964–65 | Mosaic | 7xCD; live; compiles Town Hall Concert (Jazz Workshop, 1964), Concertgebouw Amsterdam Vol. 1 (Ulysse Musique, 1985), Concertgebouw Amsterdam Vol. 2 (Ulysse Musique, 1986), Mingus at Monterey (Jazz Workshop, 1965), My Favorite Quintet (Jazz Workshop, 1966) |
| 2013 | Leader on Debut | Debut | 7xCD |
| 2014 | Mingus: The Impulse Albums | Impulse! | 3xCD |
| 2019 | The Rare Albums Collection | Enlightenment | 4xCD |

== Final works as composer ==
| Title | Label | Date (last session) | Recording | Notes |
|---|---|---|---|---|
| Me, Myself an Eye | Atlantic, 1979 | January 23, 1978 | Studio | Sessions directed by Charles Mingus |
| Something Like a Bird | Atlantic, 1980 | January 23, 1978 | Studio | Sessions directed by Charles Mingus |
| Mingus | Asylum, 1979 | 1978 | Studio | Joni Mitchell album co-written with Charles Mingus |
| Epitaph | Columbia, 1989 | June 3, 1989 | Studio | Unpublished work written between 1940 and 1962 |

== Discography as sideman ==
| Title | Label | Date (last session) | Recording | Bandleader |
|---|---|---|---|---|
| Penny's Worth Of Boogie / Look What You've Done To Me | Globe, 1945 | 1945 | Studio | Russell Jacquet |
| Blues In B Flat / Deep Meditation | Modern Music, 1945 | May 1, 1945 | Studio | Hadda Brooks, Howard McGhee |
| Rex Stewart Plays Duke Ellington/Illinois Jacquet and His All-Stars Play Uptown Jazz | Grand Award, 1955 | August 2, 1945 | Studio | Rex Stewart, Illinois Jacquet |
| Jacquet Mood / Robbins' Nest | Apollo, 1947 | August 2, 1945 | Studio | Illinois Jacquet |
| You Go To My Head / Don't Let The Sun Catch You Crying | Golden Guinea, 1945 | October 4, 1945 | Studio | Ernie Andrews |
| Paradise Lost / I Don't Stand A Ghost of A Chance | Golden Guinea, 1945 | October 4, 1945 | Studio | Ernie Andrews |
| Voot Rhythm / Baggin The Boogie | Bel Tone, 1945 | November 1, 1945 | Studio | Bob Mosely |
| Stormy Mood / Bee Boogie Boo | Bel Tone, 1945 | November 1, 1945 | Studio | Bob Mosely |
| Mellow Mama | Delmark, 1992 | December 13, 1945 | Studio | Dinah Washington |
| Dinah Washington Sings The Blues | Grand Award, 1955 | December 13, 1945 | Studio | Dinah Washington |
| Hoggin' / Blues A La King | Melodisc, 1946 | 1946 | Studio | Howard McGhee |
| Sweet Potato / Night Mist | Melodisc, 1946 | 1946 | Studio | Howard McGhee |
| Riff G.M. / Is It A Sin | Clear Tone, 1946 | 1946 | Studio | Gene Morris |
| G-Ing With Gene / Laughing At Life | Clear Tone, 1946 | 1946 | Studio | Gene Morris |
| Hot Piano | Tops, 1946 | January 1, 1946 | Studio | Wilbert Baranco |
| I Thought You Ought To Know / The Voot Is Here To Stay | Black & White, 1946 | January 1, 1946 | Studio | Ivie Anderson and her All Stars |
| I Got It Bad And That Ain't Good / On The Sunny Side Of The Street | Black & White, 1946 | January 1, 1946 | Studio | Ivie Anderson and her All Stars |
| Lena and Ivie | Jazztone, 1957 | January 1, 1946 | Studio | Lena Horne, Ivie Anderson |
| Night And Day / Weeping Willie | Black & White, 1946 | January 1, 1946 | Studio | Wilbert Baranco |
| Every Time I Think Of You / Baranco Boogie | Black & White, 1946 | January 1, 1946 | Studio | Wilbert Baranco |
| After Hours / Pipe Dream | 4 Star, 1946 | April 26, 1946 | Studio | Lady Will Carr |
| Hamp's Golden Favorites | Decca, 1962 | November 10, 1947 | Studio | Lionel Hampton |
| Lionel Hampton in Concert | Cicala Jazz, 1948 | May 1, 1948 | Studio | Lionel Hampton |
| Lionel Hampton and His Orchestra 1948 | Weka, 1948 | August 11, 1948 | Studio | Lionel Hampton |
| The Red Norvo Trio | Discovery, 1951 | May 3, 1950 | Studio | Red Norvo, Tal Farlow |
| Move: aka The Charlie Mingus Trio With Tal Farlow, Red Norvo | Savoy, 1951 | April 13, 1951 | Studio | Red Norvo |
| Midnight on Cloud 69 | Savoy, 1956 | April 13, 1951 | Studio | Various Artists |
| Birdland 1951 | Blue Note, 2004 | September 29, 1951 | Live | Miles Davis |
| Jazz At Storyville | Roost, 1952 | November 6, 1951 | Studio | Billy Taylor |
| While I'm Gone / I'll Be There | King, 1952 | December 18, 1951 | Studio | Melvin Moore |
| Possessed / Hold Me, Kiss Me, Squeeze Me | King, 1952 | December 18, 1951 | Studio | Melvin Moore |
| From Barrelhouse To Bop | Perspective, 1953 | 1952 | Studio | John Mehegan |
| Big Band | Clef, 1954 | March 25, 1952 | Studio | Charlie Parker |
| The George Wallington Trios | Prestige, 1952 | September 4, 1952 | Studio | George Wallington |
| The Happy "Bird" | Charlie Parker, 1961 | December 12, 1952 | Studio | Charlie Parker |
| 1953 Spring Sessions: Broadcast Performances: aka In March with Mingus | ESP-Disk', 1953 | March 21, 1953 | Studio | Bud Powell |
| Spring Broadcasts 1953 | ESP, 1977 | March 21, 1953 | Live | Bud Powell |
| Inner Fires | Electra/Musician, 1953 | April 5, 1953 | Studio | Bud Powell |
| Dance Of The Infidels | S.C.A.M., 1953 | May 1, 1953 | Live | Charlie Parker |
| Jazz At Massey Hall: aka The Greatest Jazz Concert Ever | Debut, 1956 | May 15, 1953 | Live | The Quintet |
| Blue Moods- aka Miles Davis Quartet | Prestige, 1954 | May 19, 1953 | Studio | Miles Davis |
| The Magnificent Charlie Parker | Clef, 1955 | May 25, 1953 | Studio | Charlie Parker |
| Jazz Perennial: The Genius of Charlie Parker #7 | Verve, 1959 | May 25, 1953 | Studio | Charlie Parker |
| 1953 Summer Sessions: Broadcast Performances | ESP-Disk', 1953 | May 30, 1953 | Studio | Bud Powell |
| Jazz Workshop, Volume One: Trombone Rapport | Debut, 1953 | September 18, 1953 | Studio | Various Artists |
| Jazz Workshop, Volume Two | Debut, 1955 | September 18, 1953 | Studio | Various Artists |
| Four Trombones | Debut, 1957 | September 18, 1953 | Studio | Various Artists |
| Introducing Paul Bley | Debut, 1954 | November 30, 1953 | Studio | Paul Bley |
| Explorations | Debut, 1953 | December 12, 1953 | Studio | Teo Macero |
| The New Oscar Pettiford Sextet: aka My Little Cello | Debut, 1953 | December 29, 1953 | Studio | Oscar Pettiford |
| Jazz Workshop Volume Three | Debut, 1955 | June 27, 1954 | Studio | Ada Moore |
| Mad Bebop | Savoy, 1978 | August 26, 1954 | Studio | Jay Jay Johnson |
| Jay & Kai | Savoy, 1955 | August 26, 1954 | Studio | Jay Jay Johnson, Kai Winding |
| The Eminent Jay Jay Johnson Volume 1 | Blue Note, 1955 | September 24, 1954 | Studio | Jay Jay Johnson |
| The Eminent Jay Jay Johnson Volume 2 | Blue Note, 1955 | September 24, 1954 | Studio | Jay Jay Johnson |
| Organ...Sweet N' Swing | Regent, 1956 | November 9, 1954 | Studio | Vin Strong |
| Heart Strings / Swingin' The Mambo | Savoy, 1955 | November 9, 1954 | Studio | Vin Strong |
| The John Mehegan Trio/Quartet | Savoy, 1955 | January 3, 1955 | Studio | John Mehegan |
| Evolution | Prestige, 1955 | January 6, 1955 | Studio | Teddy Charles |
| Relaxed Piano Moods | Debut, 1955 | January 21, 1955 | Studio | Hazel Scott |
| Very Truly Yours | Savoy, 1955 | February 5, 1955 | Studio | Jimmy Scott |
| New Piano Expressions | Debut, 1955 | March 1, 1955 | Studio | John Dennis |
| The Fabulous Thad Jones: aka Jazz Collaborations, Vol. I | Debut, 1955 | March 10, 1955 | Studio | Thad Jones |
| Easy Jazz | London, 1955 | May 27, 1955 | Studio | Ralph Sharon |
| Blue Moods | Debut, 1955 | July 9, 1955 | Studio | Miles Davis |
| Blame It On My Youth | Epic, 1956 | 1956 | Studio | Don Heller |
| Metronome All-Stars 1956 | Clef, 1956 | June 18, 1956 | Studio | Various Artists |
| This Is How I Feel About Jazz | ABC, 1957 | September 19, 1956 | Studio | Quincy Jones |
| Word from Bird | Atlantic, 1956 | November 12, 1956 | Studio | Teddy Charles |
| Modern Jazz Concert: aka Brandeis Jazz Festival | Columbia, 1958 | June 18, 1957 | Live | Six compositions commissioned by the 1957 Brandeis University Festival of the Arts |
| New Faces | Debut, 1957 | July 10, 1957 | Studio | Jimmy Knepper |
| The Weary Blues with Langston Hughes | MGM, 1959 | March 18, 1958 | Studio | Langston Hughes |
| The Jazz Life! | Candid, 1960 | January 13, 1961 | Studio | Various Artists |
| All Night Long | Fontana, 1962 | July 1, 1961 | Studio | Philip Green |
| Summit Sessions | Columbia, 1970 | July 3, 1961 | Studio | Dave Brubeck |
| Money Jungle | Blue Note, 1962 | September 17, 1962 | Studio | Duke Ellington |
| Newport In New York '72 - The Jam Sessions Vols. 1 & 2 | Cobblestone, 1972 | July 6, 1972 | Studio | Various Artists |
| After Hours - The Great Pescara Jam Sessions | Port's Song, 1975 | July 30, 1972 | Studio | Various Artists |

== Mingus bands ==
| Title | Label | Date (last session) | Recording | Band |
|---|---|---|---|---|
| Chair In The Sky | Elektra, 1979 | July 10,1979 | Studio | Mingus Dynasty |
| Live At Montreux | Atlantic, 1981 | July 18, 1980 | Live | Mingus Dynasty |
| Mingus' Sounds Of Love | Soul Note, 1988 | September 30, 1987 | Studio | Mingus Dynasty |
| Live At The Village Vanguard | Storyville, 1989 | May 27, 1984 | Live | Mingus Dynasty |
| Live At The Theatre Boulogne-Billancourt, Paris Vol. 1 | Soul Note, 1989 | June 8, 1988 | Live | Mingus Dynasty |
| Next Generation Performs Charles Mingus Brand New Compositions | Columbia, 1991 | | Studio | Mingus Dynasty |
| Weird Nightmare (Meditations On Mingus) | Columbia, 1992 | | Studio | Various Artists |
| Live At The Theatre Boulogne-Billancourt, Paris Vol. 2 | Soul Note, 1993 | June 8, 1988 | Live | Mingus Dynasty |
| Nostalgia In Times Square | Dreyfus Jazz, 1993 | March 2, 1993 | Live | Mingus Big Band |
| At the Bottom Line | West Wind, 1995 | December 1, 1979 | Live | Mingus Dynasty |
| Reincarnation | Soul Note, 1997 | April 1, 1982 | Studio | Mingus Dynasty |
| Gunslinging Birds | Dreyfus Jazz, 1995 | 1995 | Studio | Mingus Big Band |
| Live In Time | Dreyfus Jazz, 1996 | 1996 | Studio | Mingus Big Band |
| ¡Que Viva Mingus! | Dreyfus Jazz, 1997 | 1997 | Studio | Mingus Big Band |
| Blues & Politics | Dreyfus Jazz, 1999 | January 26, 1999 | Studio | Mingus Big Band |
| Tonight At Noon... Three or Four Shades of Love | Dreyfus Jazz, 2002 | December 7, 2001 | Studio | Mingus Big Band |
| I Am Three | Sunnyside, 2005 | November 7, 2004 | Studio | Mingus Big Band |
| Live In Tokyo | Sunnyside, 2006 | December 31, 2005 | Live | Mingus Big Band |
| Live At Jazz Standard | Jazz Workshop, 2010 | December 31, 2009 | Live | Mingus Big Band |
| Mingus Sings | Sunnyside, 2015 | 2015 | Studio | Mingus Big Band |
