= The Complete Debut Recordings =

Box set by Charles Mingus
- Released: September 14, 1990
- Genres: Jazz; bebop; cool jazz; hard bop; third stream
- Length: 13:48:08
- Label: Debut

The Complete Debut Recordings is a 12xCD box set by American jazz bassist, bandleader and composer Charles Mingus compiling his complete sessions as bandleader and sideman on his Debut label. It was released on Debut Records on September 14, 1990.

== Critical reception ==
Professional ratings
Review scores
| Source | Rating |
|---|---|
| The Penguin Guide to Jazz Recordings | 4/4 stars |
| AllMusic | 5/5 stars |

Scott Yanow of AllMusic summarizes the box set as "duets and trios with pianist Spaulding Givens, a variety of odd third stream originals (some with vocalist Jackie Paris and altoist Lee Konitz), the famous Massey Hall concert with Charlie Parker and Dizzy Gillespie (heard in two versions, one with Mingus' overdubbed bass), a four-trombone date with J.J. Johnson, Kai Winding, Bennie Green, and Willie Dennis, trio sets with pianists Paul Bley, Hazel Scott, and the obscure John Dennis, a quintet with trumpeter Thad Jones and Frank Wess on tenor and flute, Miles Davis' 'Alone Together' session, a date led by trombonist Jimmy Knepper, a completely unissued 1957 sextet session, and – most importantly – a greatly expanded live session with trombonist Eddie Bert and tenor saxophonist George Barrow that found Mingus finally finding himself musically."

== Track listing ==
=== Disc 1 ===
| Track | Artist | Title | Recording date | Previously issued on | Catalog number | Length |
|---|---|---|---|---|---|---|
| 1-1 | Strings and Keys | "What Is This Thing Called Love?" | April 1951 | Strings and Keys | DLP-1 (10") | 3:02 |
| 1-2 | Strings and Keys | "Darn That Dream" | April 1951 | Strings and Keys | DLP-1 (10") | 3:38 |
| 1-3 | Strings and Keys | "Yesterdays" | April 1951 | Strings and Keys | DLP-1 (10") | 3:05 |
| 1-4 | Strings and Keys | "Body and Soul" | April 1951 | Strings and Keys | DLP-1 (10") | 3:34 |
| 1-5 | Strings and Keys | "Blue Moon" | April 1951 | Strings and Keys | DLP-1 (10") | 3:33 |
| 1-6 | Strings and Keys | "Blue Tide" | April 1951 | Strings and Keys | DLP-1 (10") | 3:10 |
| 1-7 | Strings and Keys | "Darn That Dream" | April 1951 | previously unissued alternate take | | 3:37 |
| 1-8 | Strings and Keys | "Jeepers Creepers" (take 1) | April 1951 | previously unissued | | 3:37 |
| 1-9 | Strings and Keys | "Jeepers Creepers" (take 2) | April 1951 | previously unissued | | 3:03 |
| 1-10 | Charles Mingus Quintet | "Portrait" (take 1) | April 12, 1952 | previously unissued alternate take | | 3:11 |
| 1-11 | Charles Mingus Quintet | "Portrait" (take 2) | April 12, 1952 | "Precognition" / "Portrait" | M-101 (78 rpm) | 3:10 |
| 1-12 | Charles Mingus Quintet | "I've Lost My Love" (take 1) | April 12, 1952 | previously unissued | | 3:01 |
| 1-13 | Charles Mingus Quintet | "I've Lost My Love" (take 2) | April 12, 1952 | previously unissued | | 3:01 |
| 1-14 | Charles Mingus Quintet | "Extrasensory Perception" | April 12, 1952 | "Montage" / "Extrasensory Perception" | M-103 (78 rpm) | 2:48 |
| 1-15 | Charles Mingus Quintet | "Extrasensory Perception" | April 12, 1952 | previously unissued alternate take | | 2:42 |
| 1-16 | Charles Mingus Quintet | "Precognition" | April 12, 1952 | "Precognition" / "Portrait" | M-101 (78 rpm) | 2:43 |
| 1-17 | Charles Mingus Quintet | "Make Believe" | September 16, 1952 | "Paris in Blue" / "Make Believe" | M-102 (78 rpm) | 3:04 |
| 1-18 | Charles Mingus Quintet | "Paris in Blue" | September 16, 1952 | "Paris in Blue" / "Make Believe" | M-102 (78 rpm) | 3:12 |
| 1-19 | Charles Mingus Quintet | "Montage" | September 16, 1952 | "Montage" / "Extrasensory Perception" | M-103 (78 rpm | 2:55 |
| 1-20 | Spaulding Givens, Charles Mingus, Max Roach | "Day Dream" (take 1) | April 14, 1953 | previously unissued | | 3:42 |
| 1-21 | Spaulding Givens, Charles Mingus, Max Roach | "Day Dream" (take 2) | April 14, 1953 | previously unissued | | 2:38 |
| 1-22 | Spaulding Givens, Charles Mingus, Max Roach | "Theme from 'Rhapsody in Blue'" (take 1) | April 14, 1953 | previously unissued | | 3:24 |
| 1-23 | Spaulding Givens, Charles Mingus, Max Roach | "Theme from 'Rhapsody in Blue'" (take 2) | April 14, 1953 | previously unissued | | 2:39 |

=== Disc 2 ===
| Track | Artist | Title | Recording date | Previously issued on | Catalog number | Length |
|---|---|---|---|---|---|---|
| 2-1 | Spaulding Givens, Charles Mingus, Max Roach | "Jet" (take 1) | April 14, 1953 | previously unissued | | 2:44 |
| 2-2 | Spaulding Givens, Charles Mingus, Max Roach | "Jet" (take 2) | April 14, 1953 | previously unissued | | 2:35 |
| 2-3 | Hank Jones | "(Medley) You Go to My Head" | April 29, 1953 | Autobiography in Jazz | DEB-198 (12", VA compilation) | 2:42 |
| 2-4 | Honey Gordon with the Hank Jones Trio | "Can You Blame Me" | April 29, 1953 | "Bebopper" / "Can You Blame Me" | M-110 (78 rpm) | 2:48 |
| 2-5 | The Gordons with the Hank Jones Trio | "You and Me" | April 29, 1953 | "You and Me" / "Cupid" | M-111 (78 rpm) | 2:47 |
| 2-6 | The Gordons with the Hank Jones Trio | "Bebopper" | April 29, 1953 | "Bebopper" / "Can You Blame Me" | M-110 (78 rpm) | 2:40 |
| 2-7 | Honey Gordon with the Hank Jones Trio | "Cupid" | April 29, 1953 | "You and Me" / "Cupid" | M-111 (78 rpm) | 2:46 |
| 2-8 | Max Roach | "Drum Conversation" | May 15, 1953 | Autobiography in Jazz | DEB-198 (12", VA compilation) | 4:02 |
| 2-9 | Bud Powell Trio | "I've Got You Under My Skin" | May 15, 1953 | Autobiography in Jazz | DEB-198 (12", VA compilation) | 2:49 |
| 2-10 | Bud Powell Trio | "Embraceable You" | May 15, 1953 | Jazz at Massey Hall, Volume Two | DLP-3 (10") | 4:18 |
| 2-11 | Bud Powell Trio | "Sure Thing" | May 15, 1953 | Jazz at Massey Hall, Volume Two | DLP-3 (10") | 2:03 |
| 2-12 | Bud Powell Trio | "Cherokee" | May 15, 1953 | Jazz at Massey Hall, Volume Two | DLP-3 (10") | 4:48 |
| 2-13 | Bud Powell Trio | "(Jubilee) Hallelujah" | May 15, 1953 | Jazz at Massey Hall, Volume Two | DLP-3 (10") | 3:51 |
| 2-14 | Bud Powell Trio | "Lullaby of Birdland" | May 15, 1953 | Jazz at Massey Hall, Volume Two | DLP-3 (10") | 2:29 |
| 2-15 | The Quintet | "Wee (Allen's Alley)" (without bass overdubs) | May 15, 1953 | previously unissued | | 6:40 |
| 2-16 | The Quintet | "Hot House" (without bass overdubs) | May 15, 1953 | previously unissued | | 8:58 |
| 2-17 | The Quintet | "A Night in Tunisia" (without bass overdubs) | May 15, 1953 | previously unissued | | 7:22 |

=== Disc 3 ===
| Track | Artist | Title | Recording date | Previously issued on | Catalog number | Length |
|---|---|---|---|---|---|---|
| 3-1 | The Quintet | "Perdido" (without bass overdubs) | May 15, 1953 | previously unissued | | 8:10 |
| 3-2 | The Quintet | "Salt Peanuts" (without bass overdubs) | May 15, 1953 | previously unissued | | 7:18 |
| 3-3 | The Quintet | "All the Things You Are" (without bass overdubs) | May 15, 1953 | previously unissued | | 7:12 |
| 3-4 | The Quintet | "52nd Street Theme" (without bass overdubs) | May 15, 1953 | previously unissued | | 0:38 |
| 3-5 | The Quintet | "Perdido" | May 15, 1953; ? | Jazz at Massey Hall, Volume One | DLP-2 (10") | 7:42 |
| 3-6 | The Quintet | "Salt Peanuts" | May 15, 1953; ? | Jazz at Massey Hall, Volume One | DLP-2 (10") | 7:20 |
| 3-7 | The Quintet | "All the Things You Are" | May 15, 1953; ? | Jazz at Massey Hall, Volume One | DLP-2 (10") | 7:10 |
| 3-8 | The Quintet | "52nd Street Theme" | May 15, 1953; ? | Jazz at Massey Hall, Volume One | DLP-2 (10") | 0:35 |
| 3-9 | The Quintet | "Wee (Allen's Alley)" | May 15, 1953; ? | Jazz at Massey Hall, Volume Three | DLP-4 (10") | 6:36 |
| 3-10 | The Quintet | "Hot House" | May 15, 1953; ? | Jazz at Massey Hall, Volume Three | DLP-4 (10") | 9:01 |
| 3-11 | The Quintet | "A Night in Tunisia" | May 15, 1953; ? | Jazz at Massey Hall, Volume Three | DLP-4 (10") | 7:22 |

=== Disc 4 ===
| Track | Artist | Title | Recording date | Previously issued on | Catalog number | Length |
|---|---|---|---|---|---|---|
| 4-1 | Bud Powell Trio | "Bass-ically Speaking" (take 1) | Summer 1953 | previously unissued alternate take | | 3:58 |
| 4-2 | Bud Powell Trio | "Bass-ically Speaking" (take 2) | Summer 1953 | previously unissued alternate take | | 3:50 |
| 4-3 | Bud Powell Trio | "Bass-ically Speaking" (take 3) | Summer 1953 | previously unissued alternate take | | 3:51 |
| 4-4 | Bud Powell Trio | "Bass-ically Speaking" | Summer 1953 | Jazz at Massey Hall, Volume Two | DLP-3 (10") | 3:52 |
| 4-5 | Bud Powell Trio | "Untitled Blues" | Summer 1953 | previously unissued | | 2:35 |
| 4-6 | Trombone Rapport | "Wee Dot (Blues for Some Bones)" | September 18, 1953 | Jazz Workshop, Volume 2 | DLP-14 (10") | 14:17 |
| 4-7 | Trombone Rapport | "Stardust" | September 18, 1953 | Jazz Workshop, Volume 1 | DLP-5 (10") | 4:52 |
| 4-8 | Trombone Rapport | "Move" | September 18, 1953 | Jazz Workshop, Volume 1 | DLP-5 (10") | 6:48 |
| 4-9 | Trombone Rapport | "I'll Remember April" | September 18, 1953 | Jazz Workshop, Volume 2 | DLP-14 (10") | 11:04 |
| 4-10 | Kai Winding + J.J. Johnson | "Now's the Time" | September 18, 1953 | Four Trombones | DEB-126 (12") | 14:22 |

=== Disc 5 ===
| Track | Artist | Title | Recording date | Previously issued on | Catalog number | Length |
|---|---|---|---|---|---|---|
| 5-1 | Kai Winding + J.J. Johnson | "Trombosphere" | September 18, 1953 | Four Trombones | DEB-126 (12") | 3:24 |
| 5-2 | Kai Winding + J.J. Johnson | "Ow!" | September 18, 1953 | Four Trombones | DEB-126 (12") | 15:11 |
| 5-3 | Kai Winding + J.J. Johnson | "Chazzanova" (False Start of Yesterdays) | September 18, 1953 | Four Trombones | DEB-126 (12") | 4:54 |
| 5-4 | Trombone Rapport | "Yesterdays" | September 18, 1953 | Jazz Workshop, Volume 1 | DLP-5 (10") | 10:04 |
| 5-5 | Jazz Works | "Kai's Day" | September 18, 1953 | Autobiography in Jazz | DEB-198 (12"; VA compilation) | 5:22 |
| 5-6 | Charles Mingus Octet | "Pink Topsy" | October 28, 1953 | Charles Mingus Octet | EP-450 (7") | 3:03 |
| 5-7 | Charles Mingus Octet | "Miss Blues" | October 28, 1953 | Charles Mingus Octet | EP-450 (7") | 3:03 |
| 5-8 | Charles Mingus Octet | "Blue Tide" | October 28, 1953 | Charles Mingus Octet | EP-450 (7") | 3:08 |
| 5-9 | Charles Mingus Octet | "Pink Topsy" | October 28, 1953 | previously unissued alternate take | | 3:38 |
| 5-10 | Charles Mingus Octet | "Eclipse" (alternate take) | October 28, 1953 | previously unissued alternate take | | 2:57 |
| 5-11 | Charles Mingus Octet | "Eclipse" | October 28, 1953 | Charles Mingus Octet | EP-450 (7") | 2:54 |
| 5-12 | Paul Bley | "Opus 1" (alternate take) | November 30, 1953 | previously unissued alternate take | | 3:21 |
| 5-13 | Paul Bley | "Opus 1" | November 30, 1953 | Introducing Paul Bley | DLP-7 (10") | 4:08 |
| 5-14 | Paul Bley | "(Teapot) Walkin'" | November 30, 1953 | Introducing Paul Bley | DLP-7 (10") | 4:28 |

=== Disc 6 ===
| Track | Artist | Title | Recording date | Previously issued on | Catalog number | Length |
|---|---|---|---|---|---|---|
| 6-1 | Paul Bley | "Like Someone in Love" | November 30, 1953 | Introducing Paul Bley | DLP-7 (10") | 4:03 |
| 6-2 | Paul Bley | "I Can't Get Started" | November 30, 1953 | Introducing Paul Bley | DLP-7 (10") | 3:37 |
| 6-3 | Paul Bley | "Spontaneous Combustion" | November 30, 1953 | Introducing Paul Bley | DLP-7 (10") | 4:15 |
| 6-4 | Paul Bley | "The Theme" | November 30, 1953 | previously unissued | | 3:40 |
| 6-5 | Paul Bley | "Split Kick" | November 30, 1953 | Introducing Paul Bley | DLP-7 (10") | 3:05 |
| 6-6 | Paul Bley | "This Time the Dream's On Me" | November 30, 1953 | previously unissued | | 3:07 |
| 6-7 | Paul Bley | "Zootcase" | November 30, 1953 | previously unissued | | 2:33 |
| 6-8 | Paul Bley Trio | "Santa Claus Is Coming to Town" | November 30, 1953 | Autobiography in Jazz | DEP-198 (12", VA compilation) | 3:22 |
| 6-9 | Oscar Pettiford Sextet | "The Pendulum at Falcon's Lair" | December 29, 1953 | The New Oscar Pettiford Sextet | DLP-8 (10") | 4:40 |
| 6-10 | Oscar Pettiford Sextet | "Jack the Fieldstalker" | December 29, 1953 | The New Oscar Pettiford Sextet | DLP-8 (10") | 4:30 |
| 6-11 | Oscar Pettiford Sextet | "Stockholm Sweetnin'" | December 29, 1953 | The New Oscar Pettiford Sextet | DLP-8 (10") | 4:11 |
| 6-12 | Oscar Pettiford Sextet | "Low and Behold" | December 29, 1953 | The New Oscar Pettiford Sextet | DLP-8 (10") | 3:26 |
| 6-13 | Thad Jones | "Bitty Ditty" | August 11, 1954 | The Fabulous Thad Jones | DLP-12 (10") | 5:12 |
| 6-14 | Thad Jones | "Chazzanova" | August 11, 1954 | The Fabulous Thad Jones | DLP-12 (10") | 3:41 |
| 6-15 | Thad Jones | "I'll Remember April" | August 11, 1954 | The Fabulous Thad Jones | DLP-12 (10") | 3:48 |
| 6-16 | Thad Jones | "Elusive (Illusive)" | August 11, 1954 | The Fabulous Thad Jones | DLP-12 (10") | 4:50 |
| 6-17 | Thad Jones | "Sombre Intrusion" | August 11, 1954 | The Fabulous Thad Jones | DLP-12 (10") | 2:46 |
| 6-18 | Thad Jones | "You Don't Know What Love Is" | August 11, 1954 | The Fabulous Thad Jones | DLP-12 (10") | 3:29 |

=== Disc 7 ===
| Track | Artist | Title | Recording date | Previously issued on | Catalog number | Length |
|---|---|---|---|---|---|---|
| 7-1 | Hazel Scott | "Like Someone in Love" | January 21, 1955 | Relaxed Piano Moods | DLP-16 (10") | 3:47 |
| 7-2 | Hazel Scott | "Peace of Mind" | January 21, 1955 | Relaxed Piano Moods | DLP-16 (10") | 4:02 |
| 7-3 | Hazel Scott | "Lament" | January 21, 1955 | Relaxed Piano Moods | DLP-16 (10") | 4:43 |
| 7-4 | Hazel Scott | "The Jeep Is Jumpin'" | January 21, 1955 | Relaxed Piano Moods | DLP-16 (10") | 3:56 |
| 7-5 | Hazel Scott | "Git Up from There" | January 21, 1955 | Relaxed Piano Moods | DLP-16 (10") | 4:26 |
| 7-6 | Hazel Scott | "A Foggy Day" | January 21, 1955 | Relaxed Piano Moods | DLP-16 (10") | 6:04 |
| 7-7 | Hazel Scott | "Mountain Greenery" | January 21, 1955 | previously unissued | | 4:44 |
| 7-8 | Hazel Scott | "Git Up from There" (alternate take) | January 21, 1955 | previously unissued alternate take | | 3:56 |
| 7-9 | Hazel Scott | "Lament" (alternate take) | January 21, 1955 | previously unissued alternate take | | 4:56 |
| 7-10 | Charles Mingus, Thad Jones | "One More" | March 10, 1955 | Jazz Collaborations, Vol. I | DLP-17 (10") | 7:28 |
| 7-11 | Charles Mingus, Thad Jones | "I Can't Get Started" | March 10, 1955 | Jazz Collaborations, Vol. I | DLP-17 (10") | 6:05 |
| 7-12 | Charles Mingus, Thad Jones | "More of the Same" | March 10, 1955 | Jazz Collaborations, Vol. I | DLP-17 (10") | 5:12 |
| 7-13 | Charles Mingus, Thad Jones | "Get Out of Town" | March 10, 1955 | Jazz Collaborations, Vol. I | DLP-17 (10") | 8:43 |
| 7-14 | Charles Mingus, Thad Jones | "One More" (alternate take) | March 10, 1955 | previously unissued alternate take | | 3:59 |

=== Disc 8 ===
| Track | Artist | Title | Recording date | Previously issued on | Catalog number | Length |
|---|---|---|---|---|---|---|
| 8-1 | Charles Mingus, Thad Jones | "Get Out of Town" (alternate take) | March 10, 1955 | previously unissued alternate take | | 7:28 |
| 8-2 | John Dennis | "Ensenada" | March 10, 1955 | New Piano Expressions | DEB-121 (12") | 5:25 |
| 8-3 | John Dennis | "Machajo" | March 10, 1955 | New Piano Expressions | DEB-121 (12") | 4:02 |
| 8-4 | John Dennis | "Cherokee" | March 10, 1955 | New Piano Expressions | DEB-121 (12") | 4:17 |
| 8-5 | John Dennis | "Seven Moons" | March 10, 1955 | New Piano Expressions | DEB-121 (12") | 4:03 |
| 8-6 | John Dennis | "Seven Moons" (alternate take) | March 10, 1955 | previously unissued alternate take | | 4:19 |
| 8-7 | John Dennis | "All the Things You Are" (take 1) | March 10, 1955 | previously unissued | | 5:27 |
| 8-8 | John Dennis | "All the Things You Are" (take 2) | March 10, 1955 | previously unissued | | 4:12 |
| 8-9 | John Dennis | "Cherokee" (alternate take) | March 10, 1955 | previously unissued alternate take | | 5:11 |
| 8-10 | Miles Davis | "Nature Boy" | July 9, 1955 | Blue Moods | DEB-120 (12") | 6:12 |
| 8-11 | Miles Davis | "Alone Together" | July 9, 1955 | Blue Moods | DEB-120 (12") | 7:13 |
| 8-12 | Miles Davis | "There's No You" | July 9, 1955 | Blue Moods | DEB-120 (12") | 8:01 |
| 8-13 | Miles Davis | "Easy Living" | July 9, 1955 | Blue Moods | DEB-120 (12") | 5:03 |

=== Disc 9 ===
| Track | Artist | Title | Recording date | Previously issued on | Catalog number | Length |
|---|---|---|---|---|---|---|
| 9-1 | Don Senay | "The Edge of Love" | September 19, 1955 | "The Edge of Love" / "Fanny" | M-112 (78 rpm) | 2:48 |
| 9-2 | Don Senay with Strings | "Makin' Whoopee" | September 19, 1955 | Autobiography in Jazz | DEB-198 (12", VA compilation) | 2:38 |
| 9-3 | Don Senay | "Fanny" | September 19, 1955 | "The Edge of Love" / "Fanny" | M-112 (78 rpm) | 3:01 |
| 9-4 | Thad Jones with Strings | "Portrait" | September 19, 1955; September 26, 1955? | Autobiography in Jazz | DEB-198 (12", VA compilation) | 2:47 |
| 9-5 | Charles Mingus | "Jump Monk" | December 23, 1955 | Mingus at the Bohemia | DEB-123 (12") | 6:44 |
| 9-6 | Charles Mingus | "Serenade in Blue" | December 23, 1955 | Mingus at the Bohemia | DEB-123 (12") | 5:56 |
| 9-7 | Charles Mingus | "Percussion Discussion" | December 23, 1955 | Mingus at the Bohemia | DEB-123 (12") | 8:26 |
| 9-8 | Charles Mingus | "Work Song" | December 23, 1955 | Mingus at the Bohemia | DEB-123 (12") | 6:16 |
| 9-9 | Charles Mingus | "Septemberly" | December 23, 1955 | Mingus at the Bohemia | DEB-123 (12") | 6:55 |
| 9-10 | Charles Mingus | "All the Things You C#" | December 23, 1955 | Mingus at the Bohemia | DEB-123 (12") | 6:47 |
| 9-11 | Charles Mingus | "I'll Remember April" | December 23, 1955 | The Charles Mingus Quintet & Max Roach | F-86009 (12") | 13:03 |

=== Disc 10 ===
| Track | Artist | Title | Recording date | Previously issued on | Catalog number | Length |
|---|---|---|---|---|---|---|
| 10-1 | Charles Mingus | "Love Chant" | December 23, 1955 | The Charles Mingus Quintet + Max Roach | F-86009 (12") | 7:20 |
| 10-2 | Charles Mingus | "A Foggy Day" | December 23, 1955 | The Charles Mingus Quintet + Max Roach | F-86009 (12") | 5:22 |
| 10-3 | Charles Mingus | "Drums" | December 23, 1955 | The Charles Mingus Quintet + Max Roach | F-86009 (12") | 5:20 |
| 10-4 | Charles Mingus | "Haitian Fight Song" | December 23, 1955 | The Charles Mingus Quintet + Max Roach | F-86009 (12") | 5:16 |
| 10-5 | Charles Mingus | "Lady Bird" | December 23, 1955 | The Charles Mingus Quintet + Max Roach | F-86009 (12") | 5:51 |
| 10-6 | Charles Mingus | "Jump Monk" | December 23, 1955 | previously unissued alternate take | | 11:38 |
| 10-7 | Charles Mingus | "All the Things You C#" | December 23, 1955 | previously unissued alternate take | | 9:45 |
| 10-8 | Charles Mingus | "Drums" (take 1) | December 23, 1955 | previously unissued alternate take | | 6:17 |
| 10-9 | Charles Mingus | "Drums" (take 2) | December 23, 1955 | previously unissued alternate take | | 5:23 |

=== Disc 11 ===
| Track | Artist | Title | Recording date | Previously issued on | Catalog number | Length |
|---|---|---|---|---|---|---|
| 11-1 | Charles Mingus | "I'll Remember April" (alternate take) | December 23, 1955 | previously unissued alternate take | | 13:07 |
| 11-2 | Charles Mingus | "A Foggy Day" (alternate take) | December 23, 1955 | previously unissued alternate take | | 5:23 |
| 11-3 | Charles Mingus | "A Portrait of Bud Powell" | December 23, 1955 | previously unissued | | 4:09 |
| 11-4 | Charles Mingus | "Haitian Fight Song" (alternate take) | December 23, 1955 | previously unissued alternate take | | 5:17 |
| 11-5 | Charles Mingus | "Love Chant" (alternate take) | December 23, 1955 | previously unissued alternate take | | 8:12 |
| 11-6 | Charles Mingus | "Lady Bird" (alternate take) | December 23, 1955 | previously unissued alternate take | | 5:35 |
| 11-7 | Charles Mingus | "What Is This Thing Called Love?" (fragment) | December 23, 1955 | previously unissued | | 2:30 |
| 11-8 | Jimmy Knepper | "Latter Day Saint" | June 10, 1957 | Jimmy Knepper Quintet | DL-101 (7") | 4:00 |
| 11-9 | Jimmy Knepper | "Cunningbird" | June 10, 1957 | Jimmy Knepper Quintet | DL-101 (7") | 4:45 |
| 11-10 | Jimmy Knepper | "The Jumpin' Blues (Jump the Blues Away)" | June 10, 1957 | Jimmy Knepper Quintet | DL-101 (7") | 4:52 |
| 11-11 | Jimmy Knepper | "The Masher" | June 10, 1957 | Jimmy Knepper Quintet | DL-101 (7") | 3:33 |
| 11-12 | Jimmy Knepper | "Latter Day Saint" (take 1) | June 10, 1957 | previously unissued alternate take | | 5:22 |
| 11-13 | Jimmy Knepper | "Latter Day Saint" (take 2) | June 10, 1957 | previously unissued alternate take | | 3:46 |

=== Disc 12 ===
| Track | Artist | Title | Recording date | Previously issued on | Catalog number | Length |
|---|---|---|---|---|---|---|
| 12-1 | Jimmy Knepper | "The Masher" (alternate take) | June 10, 1957 | previously unissued alternate take | | 4:15 |
| 12-2 | Jimmy Knepper | "Latter Day Saint" (alternate take) | June 10, 1957 | previously unissued alternate take | | 3:51 |
| 12-3 | The Shafi Hadi Sextet | Untitled Original Blues (take 1) | September 1957 | previously unissued | | 3:55 |
| 12-4 | The Shafi Hadi Sextet | "Stella by Starlight" (take 4) | September 1957 | previously unissued | | 3:57 |
| 12-5 | The Shafi Hadi Sextet | "Stella by Starlight" (take 5) | September 1957 | previously unissued | | 3:53 |
| 12-6 | The Shafi Hadi Sextet | Untitled Original Composition (take 3) | September 1957 | previously unissued | | 5:17 |
| 12-7 | The Shafi Hadi Sextet | Untitled Original Composition (take 5) | September 1957 | previously unissued | | 4:34 |
| 12-8 | The Shafi Hadi Sextet | "Autumn in New York" (take 1) | September 1957 | previously unissued | | 5:29 |
| 12-9 | The Shafi Hadi Sextet | "Autumn in New York" (take 2) | September 1957 | previously unissued | | 5:05 |
| 12-10 | The Shafi Hadi Sextet | "Long Ago (and Far Away)" (take 2) | September 1957 | previously unissued | | 3:24 |
| 12-11 | The Shafi Hadi Sextet | "Long Ago (and Far Away)" (take 4) | September 1957 | previously unissued | | 3:11 |
| 12-12 | The Shafi Hadi Sextet | "Long Ago (and Far Away)" (take 5) | September 1957 | previously unissued | | 3:17 |
| 12-13 | The Shafi Hadi Sextet | Untitled Original Blues (take 2) | September 1957 | previously unissued | | 4:00 |
| 12-14 | The Shafi Hadi Sextet | "Joldi" (take 4) | September 1957 | previously unissued | | 5:24 |
| 12-15 | The Shafi Hadi Sextet | "Joldi" (take 5) | September 1957 | previously unissued | | 5:08 |
| 12-16 | Charles Mingus, Dannie Richmond | Untitled Percussion Composition | Late 1957 or 1958? | previously unissued | | 7:18 |

== Personnel ==
=== Disc 1, 1-9: April 1951, Los Angeles ===
- Spaulding Givens (Nadi Qamar) – piano
- Charles Mingus – bass

=== Disc 1, 10-16: April 12, 1952, Lennie Tristano Studio, New York City ===
- Jackie Paris – vocals (on 10, 11)
- Bob Benton – vocals (on 12, 13)
- Lee Konitz – alto saxophone
- Phyllis Pinkerton – piano
- George Koutzen – cello
- Charles Mingus – bass
- Al Levitt – drums

=== Disc 1, 17-19: September 16, 1952, New York City ===
- Jackie Paris – vocals
- Paige Brook – flute, alto saxophone
- John Mehegan – piano
- Jackson Wiley – cello
- Charles Mingus – bass
- Max Roach – drums

=== Disc 1, 20-23; Disc 2, 1-2: April 14, 1953, New York City ===
- Spaulding Givens (Nadi Qamar) – piano
- Charles Mingus – bass
- Max Roach – drums

=== Disc 2, 3-7: April 29, 1953, New York City ===
- Honey Gordon – vocals (except 3-3)
- Richard Gordon, George Gordon, George Gordon Jr. – vocals (on 3–5, 3–6)
- Hank Jones – piano
- Charles Mingus – bass
- Max Roach – drums

=== Disc 2, 8-17; Disc 3: May 15, 1953, Massey Hall, Toronto Canada ===
- Dizzy Gillespie – trumpet (except 2-8 – 2–14)
- Charlie Parker (as Charlie Chan on original issue) – alto saxophone (except 2-8 – 2–14)
- Bud Powell – piano (except 2–8)
- Charles Mingus – bass (except 2–8)
- Max Roach – drums

=== Disc 4, 1-5: Summer 1953, New York City ===
- Billy Taylor – piano
- Charles Mingus – bass
- unknown – drums

=== Disc 4, 6-10; Disc 5, 1-5: September 18, 1953, Putnam Central Club, Brooklyn, NY ===
- J.J. Johnson, Kai Winding, Bennie Green, Willie Dennis – trombone
- John Lewis – piano
- Charles Mingus – bass
- Art Taylor – drums

=== Disc 5, 6-11: October 28, 1953, New York City ===
- Janet Thurlow – vocals on 8,10,11
- Ernie Royal – trumpet
- Willie Dennis – trombone
- Eddie Caine – alto saxophone, flute
- Teo Macero – tenor saxophone, clarinet
- [Danny Bank – bars?]
- John Lewis – piano
- Jackson Wiley – cello
- Charles Mingus – bass
- Kenny Clarke – drums
- Spaulding Givens (Nadi Qamar) – arranger

=== Disc 5, 12-14; Disc 6, 1-8: November 30, 1953, New York City ===
- Paul Bley – piano
- Charles Mingus – bass
- Art Blakey – drums

=== Disc 6, 9-12: December 29, 1953, New York City ===
- Disc 6, 9-12: Julius Watkins – French horn
- Phil Urso – tenor saxophone
- Walter Bishop Jr. – piano
- Oscar Pettiford – cello
- Charles Mingus – bass
- Percy Brice – drums

=== Disc 6, 13-18: August 11, 1954, Van Gelder Recording, Hackensack, NJ ===
- Thad Jones – trumpet
- Frank Wess – tenor saxophone, flute
- Hank Jones – piano
- Charles Mingus – bass
- Kenny Clarke – drums

=== Disc 7, 1-9: January 21, 1955, Van Gelder Recording, Hackensack, NJ ===
- Hazel Scott – piano
- Charles Mingus – bass
- Max Roach – drums

=== Disc 7, 10-14; Disc 8, 1-9: March 10, 1955, Van Gelder Recording, Hackensack, NJ ===
- Thad Jones – trumpet (except 8-2 – 8–9)
- John Dennis – piano
- Charles Mingus – bass
- Max Roach – drums

=== Disc 8, 10-13: July 9, 1955, Van Gelder Recording, Hackensack, NJ ===
- Miles Davis – trumpet
- Britt Woodman – trombone
- Teddy Charles – [[vibraphone]]
- Charles Mingus – bass
- Elvin Jones – drums

=== Disc 9, 1-3: September 19, 1955, New York City ===
- Don Senay – vocals
- Thad Jones, Louis Mucci – trumpet
  - Thad Jones – trumpet (overdubbed onto instrumental track (without vocal) from preceding session, probably recorded September 26, 1955, New York City)
- unknown (brass)
- John LaPorta, Julius Baker – woodwinds
- Billy Taylor – piano
- unknown – harp
- Jackson Wiley – cello
- unknown – strings
- Milt Hinton, Fred Zimmerman [Charles Mingus?] – bass
- Joe Morello – drums, percussion?
  - or unknown – percussion
- Alonzo Levister – arranger

=== Disc 9, 5-11; Disc 10; Disc 11, 1-7: December 23, 1955, Cafe Bohemia, New York City ===
- Eddie Bert – trombone
- George Barrow – tenor saxophone
- Mal Waldron – piano
- Charles Mingus – bass
- Willie Jones – drums (except on 9–7, 9–11, 10–3, 10–8, 10–9, 11–1)
- Max Roach – drums (on 9–7, 9–11, 10–3, 10–8, 10–9, 11–1)

=== Disc 11, 8-13; Disc 12, 1-2: June 10, 1957, New York City ===
- Jimmy Knepper – trombone
- Joe Maini – alto saxophone
- Bill Triglia – piano
- Charles Mingus – bass
- Dannie Richmond – drums

=== Disc 12, 3-15: September (?) 1957, New York City ===
- Clarence Shaw – trumpet
- Shafi Hadi – tenor saxophone
- Pepper Adams – bars
- Wade Legge or Wynton Kelly – piano
- Charles Mingus or Henry Grimes – bass
- Dannie Richmond – drums

=== Disc 12, 16: Late 1957 or (?) 1958, New York City ===
- unknown [Shafi Hadi?] – flute
- Charles Mingus – piano, miscellaneous percussion
- Dannie Richmond – drums
- unidentified others (probably including Jimmy Knepper, Clarence Shaw, Horace Parlan or Phineas Newborn) – miscellaneous percussion
