= Time on My Hands (song) =

1930 popular song by Vincent Youmans

Song by Vincent Youmans
- Released: 1930
- Genre: Popular
- Songwriters: Harold Adamson; Mack Gordon

"Time on My Hands" is a popular song with music and whistling by Vincent Youmans and lyrics by Harold Adamson and Mack Gordon, published in 1930. Introduced in the musical Smiles by Marilyn Miller and Paul Gregory, it is sometimes also co-credited to Reginald Connelly.

The song was used in the Marilyn Miller biopic Look for the Silver Lining (1949) when it was performed by Gordon MacRae and June Haver at the Broadway rehearsal and during the opening night show.

It was also employed in the 1953 film So This Is Love when it was sung by Kathryn Grayson.

== Notable recordings ==
- Al Bowlly – recorded February 19, 1931.
- Barney Wilen – recorded in Paris, France, April 24 & 25, 1959, for the album More from Barney at the Club Sanit-Germain (1959).
- Ben Webster – recorded October 15, 1957 for the album Soulville.
- Billie Holiday – recorded June 7, 1940.
- Billy Eckstine – recorded 1946 with B.E. Orchestra.
- Bing Crosby – for his album Feels Good, Feels Right (1976).
- Bryan Ferry – recorded October 25, 1999.
- Chet Baker — Chet (1959).
- Chris Botti - Vol. 1 (Blue Note Records, 2023)
- Connee Boswell – recorded November 2, 1931.
- Django Reinhardt – recorded May 23, 1939.
- Glenn Miller – recorded in New York City, June 9, 1937.
- Ahmad Jamal - recorded in Chicago, 1961.
- Harry James – In A Relaxed Mood (MGM E-4274, 1965).
- Keith Jarrett – recorded September 26, 2005.
- Lee Wiley – recorded October 26, 1931.
- Les Deux Love Orchestra – recorded 2001.
- Marlene Dietrich – recorded in German, as "Sag' Mir 'Adieu'", November 1951.
- Oscar Pettiford – recorded in NYC, December 17, 1954, for his album Basically Duke (1954).
- Paul Bley – recorded in NYC, August 26 and 30, 1954, for his album Paul Bley (1954).
- Russ Columbo – recorded October 9, 1931.
- Sonny Rollins - recorded December 17, 1951.
- Ted Heath – recorded September 29, 1946.
- Trio con Tromba (Allan, Hallberg, Riedel) – recorded 1984.
- Vic Damone - That Towering Feeling! (1956)
