= Detroit–New York Junction =

Studio album by Thad Jones
- Released: 1956
- Recorded: March 13, 1956
- Studio: Audio-Video Studios, NYC
- Genre: Jazz
- Length: 34:30
- Label: Blue Note; BLP 1513
- Producer: Alfred Lion

Thad Jones chronology
The Fabulous Thad Jones (1956)	Detroit–New York Junction (1956)	The Magnificent Thad Jones (1956)

Detroit–New York Junction is an album by American jazz trumpeter Thad Jones recorded on March 13, 1956 and released on Blue Note.

== Background ==
The recording session was one of Tommy Flanagan's first recording sessions after he moved to New York City in 1956, and came one day after the pianist played with the same rhythm section for a Blue Note session led by Kenny Burrell.

== Reception ==
Professional ratings
Review scores
Source	Rating
AllMusic	4/5 stars
The Penguin Guide to Jazz Recordings	3/4 stars

AllMusic critic Stephen Thomas Erlewine called Detroit–New York Junction "an excellent set of driving hard bop".

== Track listing ==
All tracks are written by Thad Jones, except as noted.

Side 1
No.	Title	Writer(s)	Length
1.	"Blue Room"	Lorenz Hart; Richard Rodgers	6:48
2.	"Tariff"		5:32
3.	"Little Girl Blue"	Hart; Rodgers	2:52

Side 2
No.	Title	Length
1.	"Scratch"	10:32
2.	"Zec"	8:46

== Personnel ==
- Thad Jones – trumpet
- Billy Mitchell – tenor saxophone (except "Little Girl Blue")
- Tommy Flanagan – piano (except "Little Girl Blue")
- Kenny Burrell – guitar
- Oscar Pettiford – bass
- Shadow Wilson – drums (except "Little Girl Blue")
