= Oscar Pettiford Sextet =

Studio album by Oscar Pettiford
- Released: 1954
- Recorded: March 21, 1954; New York City
- Genre: Jazz
- Label: Vogue; Swing M 33.326

Oscar Pettiford chronology
The New Oscar Pettiford Sextet (1953)	Oscar Pettiford Sextet (1954)	Oscar Pettiford (1954)

Oscar Pettiford Sextet is an album by bassist/cellist and composer Oscar Pettiford which was recorded in 1954 and first issued on the French Vogue label as a 10-inch LP. The material on the original album was rereleased on Prestige in 1963 with additional recordings as The Oscar Pettiford Memorial Album.

== Reception ==
Professional ratings
Review scores
Source	Rating
AllMusic	4/5 stars

The AllMusic review by Scott Yanow calls it an "excellent session which features Pettiford on occasional bass solos and (on "Rhumblues") overdubbed on cello... easily recommended to bop collectors".

== Track listing ==
All compositions by Henri Renaud except where noted.

1. "Burt's Pad" - 9:45
2. "Marcel the Furrier" - 5:59
3. "Stardust" (Hoagy Carmichael, Mitchell Parish) - 5:08
4. "E-Lag" (Gerry Mulligan) - 2:33
5. "Rhumblues" (Jane Feather) - 4:27
6. "Ondine" (Leonard Feather) - 3:08
7. "Burt's Pad" [alternate take] - 6:26 Bonus track on CD reissue
8. "E-Lag" (Mulligan) [alternate take] - 2:38 Bonus track on CD reissue

== Personnel ==
- Oscar Pettiford - cello, bass
- Kai Winding - trombone
- Al Cohn - tenor saxophone
- Henri Renaud - piano
- Tal Farlow - guitar
- Max Roach - drums
