= My Little Cello =

Studio album by Oscar Pettiford and His Jazz Groups
- Released: 1960
- Recorded: July 5–6, 1960; Copenhagen, Denmark
- Genre: Jazz
- Label: Debut; DEB 132
- Producer: Ole Vestergaard

Oscar Pettiford chronology
The Essen Jazz Festival All Stars (1960)	My Little Cello (1960)	First Bass (1953-60)

Last Recordings by the Late, Great Bassist Cover

My Little Cello is an album by bassist/cellist and composer Oscar Pettiford which was recorded in Copenhagen in 1960 and first issued on the Danish Debut label. The album features Pettiford's final studio recordings and was rereleased with additional tracks as Last Recordings by the Late, Great Bassist and Montmartre Blues. The title was also used for a reissue of The New Oscar Pettiford Sextet on Fantasy in 1964 with additional material.

== Reception ==
Professional ratings
Review scores
Source	Rating
AllMusic	4/5 stars
The Rolling Stone Jazz Record Guide	5/5 stars

The AllMusic review by Scott Yanow states: "This is a fine set of boppish music that makes one wonder what Oscar Pettiford might have accomplished in the 1960s had he lived".

== Track listing ==
All compositions by Oscar Pettiford, except where indicated.

1. "Montmartre Blues Out" - 6:45
2. "Laverne Walk" - 5:15
3. "Two Little Pearls" - 5:40
4. "Blue Brothers" - 4:00 Additional track on Last Recordings by the Late, Great Bassist
5. "Straight Ahead" (Erik Nordström, Jan Johansson) - 4:35 Omitted on Last Recordings by the Late, Great Bassist
6. "Why Not? That's What!" - 7:20
7. "There Will Never Be Another You" (Harry Warren, Mack Gordon) - 5:48 Additional track on Last Recordings by the Late, Great Bassist
8. "Back in Paradise" (Hans Hammerschmidt) - 4:30 Omitted on Last Recordings by the Late, Great Bassist
9. "My Little Cello" - 3:35
10. "Willow Weep for Me" (Ann Ronell) - 3:00
11. "Montmartre Blues Encore" - 1:00 Omitted on Last Recordings by the Late, Great Bassist

Note

- Recorded in Copenhagen, Denmark on August 22, 1959 (tracks 4 & 7), July 5, 1960 (tracks 1–3, 6, 8 & 11) and July 6, 1960 (tracks 5, 9 & 10).

== Personnel ==
- Oscar Pettiford - cello, bass
- Allan Botschinsky - trumpet (tracks 1, 2, 5, 6, 9 & 11)
- Erik Nordström - tenor saxophone (tracks 1–3, 4, 5, 7, 8 & 11)
- Louis Hjulmand - vibraphone (tracks 1–9 & 10)
- Jan Johansson - piano (tracks 1–3 & 5–11)
- Jorn Elniff - drums (tracks 1, 2, 5, 6, 8, 9 & 11)
