= The Max Roach Quartet featuring Hank Mobley =

Studio album by Max Roach
- Released: 1954
- Recorded: April 10 & 21, 1953; New York City
- Genre: Jazz
- Length: 32:35
- Labels: Debut; DLP 13

Max Roach chronology
New Sounds (1952)	The Max Roach Quartet featuring Hank Mobley (1954)	Brown and Roach Incorporated (1954)

The Max Roach Quartet featuring Hank Mobley is the debut album by American jazz drummer Max Roach featuring tracks recorded in 1953 and first released on the Debut label as a 10-inch LP.

== Reception ==
Professional ratings
Review scores
Source	Rating
Allmusic	3.5/5 stars
The Penguin Guide to Jazz Recordings	3/4 stars

Allmusic awarded the album 3½ stars and its review by Scott Yanow states, "Drummer Max Roach's first studio session as a leader falls stylewise between bop and hard bop... The music is enjoyable although not as essential as the great drummer's later dates".

== Track listing ==
All compositions by Max Roach except as indicated

1. "Cou-Manchi-Cou" - 3:01
2. "Just One of Those Things" (Cole Porter) - 3:08
3. "The Glow Worm" (Paul Lincke, Johnny Mercer, Lilla C Robinson) - 2:27 Bonus track on 12 inch LP
4. "Mobleyzation" (Hank Mobley) - 2:42 Bonus track on 12 inch LP
5. "Chi-Chi" (Charlie Parker) - 2:58
6. "Kismet" (Mobley) - 2:39
7. "I'm a Fool to Want You" (Joel Herron, Frank Sinatra, Jack Wolf) - 3:13
8. "Sfax" - 2:17 Bonus track on 12 inch LP
9. "Orientation" (Mobley) - 2:50 Bonus track on 12 inch LP
10. "Drum Conversation" - 2:42
11. "Drum Conversation Part 2" - 4:38 Bonus track on CD reissue
- Recorded in New York City on April 10, 1953 (tracks 3, 4, 8 & 9) and April 21, 1953 (tracks 1, 2, 5–7, 10 & 11)

== Personnel ==
- Max Roach - drums
- Hank Mobley - tenor saxophone (tracks 1–9)
- Walter Davis, Jr. - piano (tracks 1–9)
- Franklin Skeete - bass (tracks 1–9)
- Idrees Sulieman - trumpet (tracks 3, 4, 8 & 9)
- Leon Comegys - trombone (tracks 3, 4, 8 & 9)
- Gigi Gryce - alto saxophone (tracks 3, 4, 8 & 9)
