= Oscar Pettiford (album) =

Studio album by Oscar Pettiford
- Released: 1954
- Recorded: September 1954; New York City
- Genre: Jazz
- Label: Bethlehem; BCP 1003

Oscar Pettiford chronology
The New Oscar Pettiford Sextet (1953)	Oscar Pettiford (1954)	Basically Duke (1954)

Oscar Pettiford (also released as Oscar Pettiford Modern Quintet) is an album by bassist/cellist and composer Oscar Pettiford which was recorded in 1954 and first issued on the Bethlehem label as a 10-inch LP.

== Reception ==
Professional ratings
Review scores
Source	Rating
Allmusic	4/5 stars

The Allmusic site award the album 4 stars.

== Track listing ==
All compositions by Oscar Pettiford except where noted.

1. "Sextette" (Gerry Mulligan) - 2:56
2. "The Golden Touch" (Quincy Jones) - 2:33
3. "Cable Car" - 2:20
4. "Trictrotism" - 2:42
5. "Edge of Love" (Harold Baker, Richard Ables, Mort Goode) - 2:24
6. "Rides Again" - 2:33

== Personnel ==
- Oscar Pettiford - bass, cello
- Julius Watkins - French horn
- Charlie Rouse - tenor saxophone
- Duke Jordan - piano
- Ron Jefferson- drums
- Quincy Jones - Arranger
