= Money Jungle =

Studio album by Duke Ellington with Charles Mingus and Max Roach
- Released: February 1963
- Recorded: September 17, 1962
- Studios: Sound Makers, New York City
- Genre: Post-bop
- Length: 30:12
- Label: United Artists
- Producer: Alan Douglas

Duke Ellington chronology
| Studio Sessions, New York 1962 (1962) | Money Jungle (1963) | Duke Ellington & John Coltrane (1963) |

Charles Mingus chronology
| Tijuana Moods (1962) | Money Jungle (1963) | The Charles Mingus Quintet & Max Roach (1963) |

Max Roach chronology
| It's Time (1962) | Money Jungle (1963) | The Charles Mingus Quintet & Max Roach (1963) |

Money Jungle is a studio album by the pianist Duke Ellington with the double bassist Charles Mingus and the drummer Max Roach. It was recorded on September 17, 1962, and released in February 1963 by United Artists Jazz. All but one of the compositions were written by Ellington, with four of the seven on the original LP being recorded for the first time on this album. Later releases on CD added eight tracks from the same recording session.

The album was reviewed positively at the time of its release and subsequent reviews have remained highly favorable. Negative comments have concentrated on differences in playing style among the three musicians and an arguably exaggerated generational gap between Ellington and the others, as well as a near-walkout by Mingus mid-session. Hundreds of musicians have been influenced by the recording, in particular by the freedom of individual expression within a small-group setting.

== Background ==
Producer Alan Douglas had helped Duke Ellington with errands when they were both working in Paris in the early 1960s. Later, after Douglas had joined United Artists and moved to New York, he received, according to his own account, a surprise visit from Ellington, who suggested recording a piano-based album (Ellington was known as a big band leader). Douglas suggested Charles Mingus as double bassist, who then insisted on having Max Roach as drummer. Mingus had played with Ellington before, deputising for the regular bassist in the leader's orchestra in 1953, but was fired after four days, following a fight with another musician, Juan Tizol.

At the time of the 1962 recording, Ellington was 63 years old, while Mingus was 40 and Roach 38. The generational difference was strengthened by Ellington being a guiding figure for the other two, who were born when Ellington was becoming an influence on music. In 1962, Ellington did not have a recording contract, while Mingus was signed to United Artists. According to Roach, the three musicians met the day before the recording, and Ellington told them to "Think of me as the poor man's Bud Powell" and that he would not like to play only his own material.

== Recording and music ==
The recording was made on Monday, September 17, 1962, at Sound Makers Studios in New York City, on 57th Street, between Sixth Avenue and Seventh. The session was due to begin at 1 pm. Roach arrived at midday to set up his drums and found that Ellington was already there, writing out some material. Despite his suggestion the previous day, all of the compositions used were brought by Ellington. For each piece, according to Roach, he and Mingus were given "a lead sheet that just gave the basic melody and harmony", plus a visual image described by the pianist: one example was, "crawling around on the streets are serpents who have their heads up; these are agents and people who have exploited artists. Play that along with the music". The musicians had declined the chance to rehearse, so the recording, which was made on three-track tape, was of their first experience playing together.

Money Jungle is a post-bop album. The original LP contained seven tracks – six composed by Ellington, and one, "Caravan" by Juan Tizol, strongly associated with him. The title track is a 12-bar blues that opens with strongly played notes from Mingus, then Ellington joins in with dissonant chords; Roach supports using ride cymbal, snare and bass drum. In the final minute, Down Beat magazine observed, Mingus bends the "strings with such force that he makes the instrument sound like a cross between a berimbau and a Delta blues guitar". "Fleurette Africaine" is a ballad developed from a simple melody stated on the piano, and features "Mingus's floating bassline and Roach's understated drumming". "Very Special" is another 12-bar blues, possibly improvised. These three compositions, plus "Wig Wise", with its "angular, descending line", were written specifically for this album. On "Caravan", Ellington plays the melody in low octaves, adding "Webern-like notes on the top", imitating an orchestral sound. "Warm Valley" and "Solitude" are ballads, the latter being a piano solo piece until Mingus and Roach enter in the final minute.

The CD releases feature four more compositions: "Switch Blade", "Backward Country Boy Blues", "REM Blues", and "A Little Max (Parfait)". The last of these is a Latin-influenced track that features Roach. "Switch Blade" is "a slow blues that showcases Mingus's virtuosity with a looseness that puts feeling before precision. [...He] intersperses his basslines with countermelodies and answers to what Duke plays." According to drummer Terri Lyne Carrington, "Backward Country Boy Blues" was probably given its title because part of the usual blues construction is reversed – the V chord precedes the IV chord.

=== Accounts of clashes ===
Almost every published discussion of the album emphasizes a supposed clash of personalities, but Duke Ellington has described the session positively. He said that after resolving a complaint and near-walkout by Mingus, "it was one of those mystic moments when our three muses were one and the same -- I was gassed."

Ellington has said that Roach's and Mingus's personalities were "as far apart as the north and south pole" and explained the only known incident during the recording as follows:

A funny thing happened in the middle of the session. Mingus suddenly and without warning started to pack up his bass and when I enquired [...] what was the trouble, he said 'Man I can't play with that drummer. Duke, I've always loved you and what you're doing in music, but you'll just have to get another bass player.' [...] I followed him to the elevator and after he rolled off a few more beefs, I slowly and quietly said, "Mingus, my man, UA gave you a full page ad in Xmas Billboard -- it was beautiful --yeah. You know if [Columbia] had spent [money like that] on my promotion I would be with them today.' He paused, thought for a second and said, 'Man, you're right. OK I'll play your session.' [...] we recorded very happily ever after until the album was done.

Charles Mingus has said:

I walked out because Max Roach wasn't playing good drums. Max was putting him on, playing old time, like an old man, like [...] Zutty Singleton. So I asked Max to stop puttin' Duke on, but he wouldn't pay attention during the session. "Why don't you play your way? Duke didn't hire us to come here and play what we think he's playing. He hired us to come in and be ourselves." And Max got worse. [...] He was trying to show he knew the history of jazz. I don't put him down for it, [...] I can understand now why he did it. [...] But if [Duke] wanted Zutty Singleton, he'd have got Zutty Singleton.

Max Roach has said that Mingus left because he couldn't stand the stride sound from Duke's left hand. Writer Jay Trachtenberg has said, "Drummer Max Roach once told me about the friction that accompanied the recording: how Ellington invited the others to bring individual compositions, then used only his own, and how he and bassist Charles Mingus had to fight for every inch of solo space. Roach described Mingus [...] at one point storming out of the session, and that it took Ellington’s fatherly arm-around-the-shoulder and soothing words [...] to bring [him] back into the studio to complete the date."

Douglas's version is that Mingus complained about Roach's playing, and then in the middle of a song:

Max kind of looked up at Mingus and smiled and said something. Mingus picked the bass up, put the cover on it and just [left] the studio. [Ellingon] caught up with him and convinced him to return to the studio. After they came back together, Mingus was very cooperative and took care of business for the rest of the session. [...] Mingus and Max knew each other so well that Charlie could yell at Max and it didn’t bother Max at all. He just kept on playing. So there was a healthy respect for each other and eventually they got into a groove.

Duke's son, Mercer Ellington, stated that the trio had a contract with United Artists for two albums, but that Mingus and Roach had vowed never to record together again. Previously, Mingus and Roach had recorded together, created a record label together, fist-fought against gangsters in the street together, and created a concert festival together, and Mingus had specifically insisted on Roach for the Money Jungle session.

Critic Thomas Cunniffe suggests that, listening to the tracks in the order in which they were recorded, "one can easily hear the tension building during the uptempo numbers", and that Mingus' temporary departure probably occurred after playing "Money Jungle", which "represents the apex of the group's inner tension, with Mingus plucking the strings with his fingernails, Roach firing up the music with polyrhythms and Ellington laying down highly dissonant chords". However, Ellington himself said, "Mingus with his eyes closed fell into each and every harmonic groove adding counter melodies as though he had been playing it all his life." The NY Times stated that the album is "an uncomfortable showdown of sorts."

Unrelated bassist Chris Wood (1969–present) has said that he heard a story claiming that Mingus was mad because Ellington did not use any of Mingus's compositions for the recording, but this doesn't match the reason for the temporary walkout given by Duke Ellington, Mingus himself, the producer, or Max Roach.

== Release history ==
The original LP was released by United Artists Jazz in 1963 in mono and stereo versions. United Artists was bought by EMI in 1979, and subsidiary Blue Note Records reissued the album on CD in 1987. This contained more recordings from the same session: four previously unreleased works written for the session, plus two alternative takes. The order presented in this edition was that in which the tracks were recorded. The sound quality of the original recording was improved for the 2002 Blue Note CD release by engineer Ron McMaster, using the original tapes and 24-bit remastering, adding clarity to the drums in particular. For this release, the first seven tracks were arranged in their original order, with the other four pieces and four alternative takes placed afterward, increasing the number of tracks to 15.

== Reception and influence ==
=== Critics ===
Professional ratings
Review scores
| Source | Rating |
|---|---|
| AllMusic | 4.5/5 stars |
| And It Don't Stop | A− |
| The Austin Chronicle | 4.5/5 stars |
| Down Beat | 5/5 stars |
| Encyclopedia of Popular Music | 4/5 stars |
| The Penguin Guide to Jazz | 3.5/4 stars |
| Tom Hull – on the Web | A |

Contemporaneous reviews were favorable. The album was awarded the Grand Prix of the Jazz Magazine of France. In a five-star review, Down Beat magazine's Don DeMicheal called Money Jungle "astonishing" and described Roach and Mingus as "some of the fastest company around." He repeatedly praised Mingus for pushing Ellington into new musical territory: "I've never heard Ellington play as he does on this album; Mingus and Roach, especially Mingus, push him so strongly that one can almost hear Ellington show them who's boss – and he dominates both of them, which is no mean accomplishment." Billboard was also positive, describing it as "memorable" for its content as well as "the historical importance of the three playing together".

Much later reviews have been largely positive. Ken Dryden of AllMusic called it a "sensational recording session" and recommended it to "every jazz fan". The Penguin Guide to Jazz claimed that Mingus "completely steals the show", but suggested that the "long-standing Ellington staples" "Caravan" and "Warm Valley" are relatively weak renditions, and that Mingus either did not know the changes or was disgruntled on the latter track. The Financial Times in 2013 described it as "an angular piano-trio masterpiece that [...] confirmed Ellington's inherent modernism". Jay Trachtenberg of The Austin Chronicle praised Ellington's playing and "the modernity of his ideas", and said that the album "stands, more than ever, as a masterful meeting of jazz royalty." Writing of the record's 1986 "remixed and reprogrammed" reissue, Village Voice critic Robert Christgau said "the angular chromaticism and modernist swing of this session relegate most piano-trio records back to the supper clubs." Charles Waring of uDiscover has written, "the generational differences between its three participants are often exaggerated. [...] the result of their collaboration wasn’t a confrontational face-off but a joyous celebration of jazz created by three unlikely kindred spirits." Describing “Les Fleurs Africaines” in the Village Voice, David Yaffe wrote, "Max’s cool, inchoate rumblings glide beneath the Duke’s Zen intervals and Mingus’s steady yet loose pluckings. [...] Mingus’s mysterious trills on the main motif [and] hypnotic, peripatetic wanderings [...] are both away from and in response to Duke’s refrain. [...] A fiery pastorale.” Matt Levin in The Paris Review wrote that the album is "a monument to disharmony—and it is a masterpiece for it."

The sound quality of the original recording has been described as "disappointingly woolly", with "incidents of peaky distortion from the piano microphone". The stereo recording has the piano "up front and center", with the double bass "far to the right channel" and the drums "Strictly in the left channel and slightly behind the piano".

=== Musicians ===
Hundreds of musicians have been inspired by the album. Pianist Lafayette Gilchrist states that Money Jungle was the first jazz album that he bought, and that it "sounds like an orchestra being played by a trio. I was inspired to make something [...] big and grandiose just like that". Drummer Jeff "Tain" Watts observed that the members of the trio were "doing their thing, but they’re together", and compares this with later groups led by Keith Jarrett and Wayne Shorter, stating that the later groups "have a much freer way of doing it, but everybody's kind of in their own zone and yet they’re definitely playing the composition in tune with each other, just like Duke and Max and Mingus were doing on Money Jungle." Trumpeter Miles Davis had a different view of the session: in a 1964 Down Beat blind listening test of the track "Caravan", he criticised the record company for putting the three musicians together, saying that "Max and Mingus can play together, by themselves. Mingus is a hell of a bass player, and Max is a hell of a drummer. But Duke can't play with them, and they can't play with Duke."

Pianists have been impressed by Ellington's playing. Fred Hersch believes that it is one of Ellington's best recordings on piano, as he was forced by the other musicians to improvise in ways beyond what he would normally have played. Matthew Shipp commented on the free elements in the playing, describing the album as "one of the greatest examples of piano playing I've ever heard". John Medeski remarked on the forceful, contrapuntal interaction, facilitated by space. Ethan Iverson commented that, on "Fleurette Africaine", "There's a group dynamic present that's quite amazing. [...] It's a forerunner of The Bad Plus", the trio that he co-founded.

In 1999, the band Rhythm and Brass included Money Jungle tracks on their album More Money Jungle... Ellington Explorations. Drummer Terri Lyne Carrington led the 2013 release Money Jungle: Provocative in Blue, which includes cover versions of tracks from the original album. Of the compositions premiered on the album, "Fleurette Africaine" and "Wig Wise" are commonly recorded by others.

== Track listing ==
All pieces composed by Duke Ellington, except where stated.

=== LP (1963 – UAJ) ===
Side one
| No. | Title | Length |
|---|---|---|
| 1. | "Money Jungle" | 5:30 |
| 2. | "Le Fleurs Africaines (African Flower)" | 3:36 |
| 3. | "Very Special" | 4:26 |
| 4. | "Warm Valley" | 3:33 |

Side two
| No. | Title | Writer(s) | Length |
|---|---|---|---|
| 1. | "Wig Wise" | | 3:21 |
| 2. | "Caravan" | music: Juan Tizol and Duke Ellington; lyrics: Irving Mills | 4:13 |
| 3. | "Solitude" | music: Duke Ellington; lyrics: Eddie DeLange and Mills | 5:33 |

=== LP reissue (1986 – Blue Note) ===
Side one
| No. | Title | Length |
|---|---|---|
| 1. | "Money Jungle" | 5:26 |
| 2. | "Fleurette Africaine (African Flower)" | 3:33 |
| 3. | "Very Special" | 4:23 |
| 4. | "Warm Valley" | 3:31 |
| 5. | "REM Blues" | 4:15 |
| 6. | "A Little Max (Parfait)" | 2:55 |

Side two
| No. | Title | Length |
|---|---|---|
| 1. | "Wig Wise" | 3:17 |
| 2. | "Switch Blade" | 5:22 |
| 3. | "Caravan" | 4:12 |
| 4. | "Backward Country Boy Blues" | 6:21 |
| 5. | "Solitude" | 5:32 |

=== CD (1987 – Blue Note) ===
Composers are as above.

| No. | Title | Length |
|---|---|---|
| 1. | "Very Special" | 4:27 |
| 2. | "A Little Max (Parfait)" | 2:58 |
| 3. | "A Little Max (Parfait)" (alternative take) | 3:56 |
| 4. | "Fleurette Africaine (African Flower)" | 3:37 |
| 5. | "REM Blues" | 4:17 |
| 6. | "Wig Wise" | 3:19 |
| 7. | "Switch Blade" | 5:25 |
| 8. | "Caravan" | 4:14 |
| 9. | "Money Jungle" | 5:30 |
| 10. | "Solitude" (alternative take) | 4:44 |
| 11. | "Solitude" | 5:34 |
| 12. | "Warm Valley" | 3:34 |
| 13. | "Backward Country Boy Blues" | 6:19 |

=== CD (2002 – Blue Note) ===
Composers are as above.

| No. | Title | Length |
|---|---|---|
| 1. | "Money Jungle" | 5:29 |
| 2. | "Fleurette Africaine (African Flower)" | 3:36 |
| 3. | "Very Special" | 4:26 |
| 4. | "Warm Valley" | 3:32 |
| 5. | "Wig Wise" | 3:20 |
| 6. | "Caravan" | 4:12 |
| 7. | "Solitude" | 5:33 |
| 8. | "Switch Blade" | 5:24 |
| 9. | "A Little Max (Parfait)" | 2:58 |
| 10. | "REM Blues" | 4:18 |
| 11. | "Backward Country Boy Blues" | 6:33 |
| 12. | "Solitude" (alternative take) | 4:44 |
| 13. | "Switch Blade" (alternative take) | 5:13 |
| 14. | "A Little Max (Parfait)" (alternative take) | 2:57 |
| 15. | "REM Blues" (alternative take) | 5:45 |

== Personnel ==
=== Musicians ===
- Duke Ellington – piano
- Charles Mingus – double bass
- Max Roach – drums

=== Production ===
1963 LP

- Alan Douglas – production
- Bill Schwartau – engineering
- Frank Gauna – design and photography
- George Wein – liner notes

1987 CD

- Michael Cuscuna – reissue production
- Malcolm Addey – remix engineering

2002 CD

- Michael Cuscuna – reissue production
- Ron McMaster – remix/remastering engineering
