= Jazz at Massey Hall =

1953 live album by the Quintet

- Original Jazz Classics reissue

Live album by the Quintet
- Released: December 1953
- Recorded: 15 May 1953
- Venue: Massey Hall, Toronto, Canada
- Genre: Bebop
- Length: 46:54
- Label: Debut
- Producer: Charles Mingus

Charlie Parker chronology
South of the Border (1952)	Jazz at Massey Hall (1953)	Big Band (1954)

Bud Powell chronology
The Amazing Bud Powell (1952)	Jazz at Massey Hall (1953)	The Amazing Bud Powell, Vol. 2 (1954)

Professional ratings
Review scores
Source	Rating
AllMusic	5/5 stars
MSN Music (Consumer Guide)	A
The Rolling Stone Jazz Record Guide	5/5 stars
The Penguin Guide to Jazz Recordings	4/4 stars
All About Jazz	5/5 stars

Jazz at Massey Hall is a live album released in December 1953 by jazz combo The Quintet through Debut Records. It was recorded on 15 May 1953 at Massey Hall in Toronto, Canada. Credited to "the Quintet", the jazz group was composed of five leading "modern" players of the day: Dizzy Gillespie, Charlie Parker, Bud Powell, Charles Mingus, and Max Roach. It was the only time that the five musicians recorded together as a unit, and it was the last recorded meeting of Parker and Gillespie.

== Background ==
The first pianist considered by the organizers was Lennie Tristano, but he suggested Powell as a more appropriate match for the other musicians. Oscar Pettiford was considered as an alternative to Mingus.

== The concert ==
Parker played a Grafton saxophone on this date; he could not be listed on the original album cover for contractual reasons, so was billed as "Charlie Chan", an allusion to the fictional detective and to Parker's wife Chan. The concert included performances by both the entire quintet and a trio consisting of Powell, Mingus, and Roach, as well as a Roach drum solo.

The original plan was for the Toronto New Jazz Society and the musicians to share the profits from the concert. However, owing to a boxing prize fight between Rocky Marciano and Jersey Joe Walcott taking place simultaneously, the audience was so small that the Society was unable to pay the musicians' fees. The musicians were all given NSF checks, and only Parker was able to cash his; Gillespie noted that he did not receive his fee "for years and years".

Jazz authority Burt Korall says that for Roach, this performance was a "culmination on record of music and relationships developed in the 1940s." Despite the difficulties, according to Korall, "the music was the great leveler."

The opening act on the night was a 16-piece big band billed as the CBC All Stars.

== Album releases ==
The record was originally issued in December 1953 on Mingus's label Debut, from a recording made by the Toronto New Jazz Society (Dick Wattam, Alan Scharf, Roger Feather, Boyd Raeburn and Arthur Granatstein). Mingus took the recording to New York where he and Max Roach dubbed in the bass lines, which were under-recorded on most of the tunes, and exchanged Mingus soloing on "All the Things You Are".

A 2002 reissue, Complete Jazz at Massey Hall, released on The Jazz Factory label, contains the full concert, without the overdubbing.

Jazz at Massey Hall was inducted into the Grammy Hall of Fame in 1995. It is included in National Public Radio's "Basic Jazz Library". The Penguin Guide to Jazz Recordings included the album in its suggested "core collection" of essential recordings. The concert was issued in some territories under the tag "the greatest jazz concert ever".

== Track listing ==
(Originally issued as two 10" LPs:)

Vol. 1 (Debut DLP-2)

1. "Perdido" (Juan Tizol) – 7:43
2. "Salt Peanuts" (Dizzy Gillespie, Kenny Clarke) – 7:39
3. "All the Things You Are" (Jerome Kern)/"52nd Street Theme" (Thelonious Monk) – 7:52

Vol. 3 (Debut DLP-4)

1. "Wee (Allen's Alley)" (Denzil Best) – 6:41
2. "Hot House" (Tadd Dameron) – 9:11
3. "A Night in Tunisia" (Gillespie, Frank Paparelli) – 7:34

(Vol. 2 consists of the trio recordings of Powell, Mingus and Roach from the same date: all but "I've Got You Under My Skin", and one track by Billy Taylor with Mingus and Roach from a later date.)

(Issued as 12" LP:)

(Debut DEB-124)

1. "Perdido" (Juan Tizol)
2. "Salt Peanuts" (Dizzy Gillespie, Kenny Clarke)
3. "All the Things You Are" (Jerome Kern)
4. "52nd Street Theme" (Thelonious Monk)
5. "Wee (Allen's Alley)" (Denzil Best)
6. "Hot House" (Tadd Dameron)
7. "A Night in Tunisia" (Gillespie, Frank Paparelli)

(The 2004 reissue contains 14 tracks, with Parker and Gillespie not appearing on 5 through 11.)

1. "Perdido" (Juan Tizol)
2. "Salt Peanuts" (Dizzy Gillespie, Kenny Clarke)
3. "All the Things You Are" (Jerome Kern)
4. "52nd Street Theme" (Thelonious Monk)
5. "Drum Conversation" (Max Roach)
6. "Cherokee" (Ray Noble)
7. "Embraceable You" (George Gershwin)
8. "Hallelujah (Jubilee)" (Vincent Youmans)
9. "Sure Thing" (Bud Powell)
10. "Lullaby of Birdland" (George Shearing)
11. "I've Got You Under My Skin" (Cole Porter)
12. "Wee (Allen's Alley)" (Denzil Best)
13. "Hot House" (Tadd Dameron)
14. "A Night in Tunisia" (Gillespie, Frank Paparelli)

(Craft Records, 2023 re-release, 2 CD's)

Disc 1: Original concert recordings, without bass overdubs. Parker and Gillespie play only on tracks 1 through 6.

1. "Perdido"
2. "Salt Peanuts"
3. "All the Things You Are / 52nd Street Theme"
4. "Wee (Allen's Alley)"
5. "Hot House"
6. "A Night in Tunisia"
7. "Drum Conversation"
8. "I've Got You Under My Skin"
9. "Embraceable You"
10. "Sure Thing"
11. "Cherokee"
12. "Hallelujah"
13. "Lullaby of Birdland"

Disc 2 presents the first six tracks above, with bass overdubs.

== Personnel ==
- Dizzy Gillespie – trumpet, vocal on "Salt Peanuts"
- Charles Mingus – double bass
- Charlie Parker – alto saxophone
- Bud Powell – piano
- Max Roach – drums

An album of a trio set, played by Powell, Mingus and Roach at the concert, was also issued (tracks 6 through 11 above).

== Other sources ==
- Mark Miller. Cool Blues: Charlie Parker in Canada 1953. London, Ontario: Nightwood Editions, 1989. (contains the definitive account of the concert events)
- Richard Cook and Brian Morton. The Penguin Guide to Jazz on CD 6th edition. ISBN 0-14-051521-6, 2008.
- Geoffrey Haydon. Quintet of the Year, London: Aurum Press, 2002. Urbina, Fernando Ortiz De (May 15, 2013). "Easy does it: SALT PEANUTS!!! SALT PEANUTS!!! – Massey Hall, 60 years after".
