= The Magnificent Thad Jones =

Studio album by the Magnificent Thad Jones
- Released: late 1956
- Recorded: July 14, 1956; July 9, 1956 ("Something to Remember You By")
- Studio: Van Gelder Studio; Hackensack, New Jersey
- Genre: Jazz
- Length: 38:06 (LP); 49:37 (CD)
- Label: Blue Note; BLP 1527
- Producer: Alfred Lion

Thad Jones chronology
Detroit-New York Junction (1956)	The Magnificent Thad Jones (1956)	Mad Thad (1956-57)

The Magnificent Thad Jones is an album by American jazz trumpeter Thad Jones recorded on July 14, 1956 and released on Blue Note later that year.

== Reception ==
Professional ratings
Review scores
Source	Rating
AllMusic	5/5 stars
The Penguin Guide to Jazz Recordings	3.5/4 stars

The AllMusic review by Michael G. Nastos states, "this quintet makes truly great jazz music together... The musicianship being at such a lofty plateau, so intelligently selected and executed, this CD is a must-have for every collection, and is generally regarded as the very best work of Jones, later big-band recordings with Mel Lewis notwithstanding."

== Track listing ==
=== Side 1 ===
1. "April in Paris" (Vernon Duke, E. Y. Harburg) – 6:43
2. "Billie-Doo" (Thad Jones) – 7:30
3. "If I Love Again" (Jack Murray, Ben Oakland) – 7:27

=== Side 2 ===
1. "If Someone Had Told Me" (Peter DeRose, Charles Tobias) – 5:51
2. "Thedia" (Jones) – 10:35

=== CD bonus tracks ===
6. "I've Got a Crush on You" (George Gershwin, Ira Gershwin) – 7:38
7. "Something to Remember You By" (Howard Dietz, Arthur Schwartz) – 3:53
- Recorded on July 9 (#7) and 14 (all others), 1956.

== Personnel ==
=== Musicians ===
- Thad Jones – trumpet
- Billy Mitchell – tenor saxophone
- Kenny Burrell – guitar ("Something to Remember You By")
- Barry Harris – piano
- Percy Heath – bass
- Max Roach – drums

=== Technical personnel ===
- Alfred Lion – producer
- Rudy Van Gelder – recording engineer
- Reid Miles – design
- Francis Wolff – photography
- Leonard Feather – liner notes
