= The Oscar Pettiford Orchestra in Hi-Fi Volume Two =

Studio album by Oscar Pettiford
- Released: 1958
- Recorded: August 23 & 30 and September 6, 1957; New York City
- Genre: Jazz
- Label: ABC-Paramount; ABC 227
- Producer: Creed Taylor

Oscar Pettiford chronology
The Oscar Pettiford Orchestra in Hi-Fi (1956)	The Oscar Pettiford Orchestra in Hi-Fi Volume Two (1958)	Winner's Circle (1957)

The Oscar Pettiford Orchestra in Hi-Fi Volume Two (also referred to as O.P.'s Jazz Men) is an album by bassist/cellist and composer Oscar Pettiford that was recorded in 1957 and first issued on the ABC-Paramount label.

== Reception ==
Professional ratings
Review scores
Source	Rating
Allmusic	4.5/5 stars

The Allmusic site awarded the album 4½ stars.

== Track listing ==
All compositions by Oscar Pettiford except where noted.

1. "Now See How You Are" (Pettiford, Woody Harris) - 5:10
2. "Laura" (David Raksin, Johnny Mercer) - 3:40
3. "Aw! Come On" - 3:55
4. "I Remember Clifford" (Benny Golson) - 4:42
5. "Somewhere" (Ray Copeland) - 4:00
6. "Seabreeze" (Larry Douglas) - 2:54
7. "Little Niles" (Randy Weston) - 4:40

Note

- Recorded in New York City on August 23, 1957 (tracks 1, 3 & 4). August 30, 1957 (tracks 2 & 5), and September 6, 1957 (tracks 6 & 7)

== Personnel ==
- Oscar Pettiford - bass, cello
- Ray Copeland, Kenny Dorham (tracks 6 & 7), Art Farmer (tracks 1–5) - trumpet
- Al Grey - trombone
- David Amram, Julius Watkins - French horn
- Gigi Gryce - alto saxophone, arranger
- Benny Golson - tenor saxophone, arranger
- Jerome Richardson - tenor saxophone, flute
- Sahib Shihab - baritone saxophone
- Betty Glamann - harp (tracks 2, 4, 6 & 7)
- Dick Katz - piano
- Gus Johnson- drums
