= The Oscar Pettiford Orchestra in Hi-Fi =

Studio album by Oscar Pettiford
- Released: 1956
- Recorded: June 11, 12 & 19, 1956; New York City
- Genre: Jazz
- Label: ABC-Paramount; ABC 135

Oscar Pettiford chronology
Another One (1955)	The Oscar Pettiford Orchestra in Hi-Fi (1956)	The Oscar Pettiford Orchestra in Hi-Fi Volume Two (1957)

The Oscar Pettiford Orchestra in Hi-Fi is an album by bassist/cellist and composer Oscar Pettiford. It was recorded in 1956 and first issued on the ABC-Paramount label. The album was reissued on CD on Impulse! Records as Deep Passion in 1994 combined with The Oscar Pettiford Orchestra in Hi-Fi Volume Two.

== Reception ==
Professional ratings
Review scores
Source	Rating
Allmusic	3/5 stars

The Allmusic site awarded the album 3 stars.

== Track listing ==
All compositions by Oscar Pettiford except where noted.

1. "The Pendulum at Falcon's Lair" - 3:04
2. "The Gentle Art of Love" - 3:41
3. "Not So Sleepy" (Mat Mathews) - 4:58
4. "Speculation" (Horace Silver) - 4:10
5. "Smoke Signal" (Gigi Gryce) - 4:22
6. "Nica's Tempo" (Gryce) - 3:53
7. "Deep Passion" (Lucky Thompson) - 3:45
8. "Sunrise-Sunset" - 4:03
9. "Perdido" (Juan Tizol, Ervin Drake, Hans Lengsfelder) - 4:08
10. "Two French Fries" (Gryce) - 2:52
- Recorded in New York City on June 11, 1956 (tracks 6 & 7), June 12, 1956 (tracks 3, 5, 8 & 9) and June 19, 1956 (tracks 1, 2, 4 & 10)

== Personnel ==
- Oscar Pettiford - bass, cello
- Art Farmer, Ernie Royal - trumpet
- Jimmy Cleveland - trombone
- David Amram, Julius Watkins - French horn
- Gigi Gryce - alto saxophone, arranger
- Lucky Thompson - tenor saxophone, arranger
- Jerome Richardson - tenor saxophone, flute
- Danny Bank - baritone saxophone
- Janet Putnam - harp (tracks 1–5)
- Tommy Flanagan - piano
- Whitey Mitchell - bass (track 5)
- Osie Johnson- drums
