= Basically Duke =

Studio album by Oscar Pettiford
- Released: 1954
- Recorded: December 17, 1954; New York City
- Genre: Jazz
- Label: Bethlehem; BCP 1019

Oscar Pettiford chronology
| Oscar Pettiford (1954) | Basically Duke (1954) | Another One (1955) |

Basically Duke is an album by bassist/cellist and composer Oscar Pettiford which was recorded in 1954 and first issued on the Bethlehem label as a 10-inch LP.

== Reception ==
Professional ratings
Review scores
| Source | Rating |
|---|---|
| Allmusic | 4/5 stars |

The Allmusic site awarded the album 4 stars.

== Track listing ==
All compositions by Oscar Pettiford except where noted.

1. "Jack the Bear" (Duke Ellington) - 3:15
2. "Tamalpais" - 3:33
3. "Swing Until the Girls Come Home" - 3:54
4. "Mood Indigo" (Ellington, Barney Bigard, Irving Mills) - 2:56
5. "Chuckles" (Clark Terry) - 2:42
6. "Time on My Hands" (Vincent Youmans, Harold Adamson, Mack Gordon) - 3:10

== Personnel ==
- Oscar Pettiford - bass, cello
- Clark Terry, Joe Wilder - trumpet
- Jimmy Cleveland - trombone
- Jimmy Hamilton - clarinet, tenor saxophone
- Dave Schildkraut - alto saxophone
- Danny Bank - baritone saxophone
- Earl Knight - piano
- Osie Johnson- drums
