= Another One (Oscar Pettiford album) =

Studio album by Oscar Pettiford
- Released: 1955
- Recorded: August 12, 1955; New York City
- Genre: Jazz
- Label: Bethlehem; BCP 33

Oscar Pettiford chronology
Basically Duke (1954)	Another One (1955)	The Oscar Pettiford Orchestra in Hi-Fi (1956)

Another One (also released as Oscar Pettiford Volume 2) is an album by bassist/cellist and composer Oscar Pettiford which was recorded in 1955 and first issued on the Bethlehem label.

== Reception ==
Professional ratings
Review scores
Source	Rating
Allmusic	4/5 stars

The Allmusic review by Al Campbell states: "This is not just a bebop date; Pettiford had the range to incorporate influences like Duke Ellington and calypso, creating a full, lyrical band sound that matched his bass playing".

== Track listing ==
All compositions by Oscar Pettiford except where noted.

1. "Another One" (Quincy Jones) - 5:10
2. "Minor Seventh Heaven" (Osie Johnson) - 4:11
3. "Stardust" (Hoagy Carmichael, Mitchell Parish) - 3:31
4. "Bohemia After Dark" - 5:35
5. "Oscalypso" - 2:24
6. "Scorpio" (Mary Lou Williams) - 3:46
7. "Titoro" (Billy Taylor) - 3:21
8. "Don't Squawk" - 4:17
9. "Kamman's a-Comin'" - 4:12

== Personnel ==
- Oscar Pettiford - bass, cello
- Donald Byrd, Ernie Royal - trumpet (tracks 1, 2 & 4–9)
- Bob Brookmeyer - valve trombone (tracks 1, 2 & 4–9)
- Gigi Gryce - alto saxophone, clarinet (tracks 1, 2 & 4–9)
- Jerome Richardson - tenor saxophone, clarinet, flute (tracks 1, 2 & 4–9)
- Don Abney - piano
- Osie Johnson- drums (tracks 1, 2 & 4–9)
