= Pithecanthropus Erectus (album) =

Studio album by Charles Mingus
- Released: August 1956
- Recorded: January 30, 1956
- Studios: Audio-Video Studios; New York City
- Genres: Jazz, post-bop
- Length: 36:36
- Label: Atlantic
- Producer: Nesuhi Ertegun

Charles Mingus chronology
Mingus at the Bohemia (1956)	Pithecanthropus Erectus (1956)	The Clown (1957)

Pithecanthropus Erectus is a studio album by the jazz composer and bassist Charles Mingus. It was released in August 1956 through Atlantic Records. Mingus noted that this was the first album where he taught arrangements to his musicians by ear instead of putting the chords and arrangements in writing.

== Music ==
According to Mingus' liner notes, the title song is a ten-minute tone poem, depicting the rise of man from his hominid roots (Pithecanthropus erectus) to an eventual downfall due to "his own failure to realize the inevitable emancipation of those he sought to enslave, and his greed in attempting to stand on a false security." The song's title refers to the Java Man fossil, which at the time of its discovery was the oldest human fossil ever found.

== Reception ==
Professional ratings
Review scores
Source	Rating
AllMusic	5/5 stars
Tom Hull	A
The Penguin Guide to Jazz Recordings	4/4 stars
Q	4/5 stars
The Rolling Stone Album Guide	5/5 stars
Vibe	(not rated)

The Penguin Guide to Jazz gave it a maximum four-star rating and included it in its “core collection” of essential recordings, describing it as "One of the truly great modern jazz albums". In the same review, "the all-in ensemble work" in parts of the first track, "Pithecanthropus Erectus", is described as being "absolutely crucial to the development of free collective improvisation in the following decade".

== Track listing ==
All tracks composed by Charles Mingus except where noted.

1. "Pithecanthropus Erectus" – 10:36
2. "A Foggy Day" – 7:50 (George Gershwin)
3. "Profile of Jackie" – 3:11
4. "Love Chant" – 14:59

== Personnel ==
=== Musicians ===
- Charles Mingus – bass
- Jackie McLean – alto saxophone
- J. R. Monterose – tenor saxophone
- Mal Waldron – piano
- Willie Jones – drums, tambourine (overdubbed)

=== Production ===
- Tom Dowd – recording engineering
- Hal Lustig – recording engineering
