= The Fabulous Thad Jones =

Studio album by Thad Jones
- Released: 1954
- Recorded: August 11, 1954; Van Gelder Studio, Hackensack, NJ
- Genre: Jazz
- Length: 23:49 (original 10 inch LP release)
- Label: Debut

Thad Jones chronology
The Fabulous Thad Jones (1954)	Detroit – New York Junction (1956)

12 inch LP release
- Thad Jones (DEB 127)

10 inch LP release of 4 tracks
- ...Jazz Collaborations, Vol. 1 (DLP 17)

Professional ratings
Review scores
Source	Rating
Allmusic	4.5/5 stars
The Penguin Guide to Jazz Recordings	3.5/4 stars

The Fabulous Thad Jones is the debut album by American jazz trumpeter Thad Jones recorded in 1954 and originally released on Charles Mingus' Debut Records label as a 10-inch LP. The album was later re-issued as a 12-inch LP titled simply, Thad Jones.

== Release history ==
The Fabulous Thad Jones (Debut DLP-12) was initially released with a total of 6 tracks recorded on 11 August 1954. The 12 inch LP version, Thad Jones (Debut DEB 127), included an additional 4 tracks taken from a 10 March 1955 recording session that had previously been released as Thad Jones/Charles Mingus - Jazz Collaborations, Vol. 1 (Debut DLP 17). The 12 inch re-issue also replaced the original "Get Out of Town" with an alternate take and included an unedited version of "One More Time" different from that on the ...Jazz Collaborations... release. Later CD re-issues include both versions of "Get Out of Town" and "One More Time" as bonus tracks.

== Reception ==
The Allmusic review by Scott Yanow of the CD reissue, which also compiles tracks from Jones' second LP, stated: "The 12 performances (which include two alternate takes) really put the focus on Jones' accessible yet unpredictable style".

== Track listing ==
All compositions by Thad Jones, except as indicated.

=== Thad Jones (DEB 127) ===
LP side A:

1. "Get Out of Town" (Porter) – 8:43
2. "One More" – 7:28
3. "Bitty Ditty" – 4:53
4. "More of the Same" – 5:12

LP side B:

1. "Elusive" – 5:12
2. "Sombre Intrusion" – 2:46
3. "I Can't Get Started" (Duke, I. Gershwin) – 6:06
4. "I'll Remember April" (DePaul, Patricia Johnston, Raye) – 3:48
5. "You Don't Know What Love Is" (DePaul, Raye) – 3:29
6. "Chazzanova" (Mingus) – 3:41

Later CD re-issue bonus tracks:

11. "Get Out of Town" (Porter) – 7:31
12. "One More" – 4:00

Original 10 inch LP releases:

=== The Fabulous Thad Jones (DLP 12) ===
LP side A:

1. "Elusive" – 5:12
2. "Sombre Intrusion" – 2:46
3. "You Don't Know What Love Is" (DePaul, Raye) – 3:29

LP side B:

1. "Bitty Ditty" – 4:53
2. "Chazzanova" (Mingus) – 3:41
3. "I'll Remember April" (DePaul, Johnston, Raye) – 3:48

=== Thad Jones/Charles Mingus - Jazz Collaborations, Vol. 1 (DLP 17) ===
LP side A:

1. "One More" – 4:00 (edited version)
2. "I Can't Get Started" (Duke, I. Gershwin) – 6:06

LP side B:

1. "More of the Same" – 5:12
2. "Get Out of Town" (Porter) – 7:31

All track times are from CD re-issue

== Personnel ==
- Thad Jones – trumpet
- Charles Mingus – bass

On the 1954 The Fabulous Thad Jones tracks:

- Frank Wess – tenor saxophone, flute
- Hank Jones – piano
- Kenny Clarke – drums

On the 1955 Thad Jones / Charles Mingus Jazz Collaborations Vol. 1 tracks:

- John Dennis – piano
- Max Roach – drums
