= Mingus at the Bohemia =

Live album by Charles Mingus
- Released: August 1956
- Recorded: December 23, 1955
- Venue: Café Bohemia, New York City
- Genre: Avant-garde jazz
- Length: 41:04
- Label: Debut

Charles Mingus chronology
The Jazz Experiments of Charlie Mingus (1954)	Mingus at the Bohemia (1956)	Pithecanthropus Erectus (1956)

Professional ratings
Review scores
Source	Rating
Allmusic	4.5/5 stars
The Penguin Guide to Jazz Recordings	3/4 stars

Mingus at the Bohemia is a live album by the jazz composer and bassist Charles Mingus. It was released in August 1956 through Mingus's own label Debut Records. It was recorded at Café Bohemia in New York City on December 23, 1955. Max Roach makes a guest appearance on one track. Other recordings from the same performance were released in 1964 under the title The Charles Mingus Quintet & Max Roach.

Mingus at the Bohemia has also been released under the title Chazz! and credited to The Charles Mingus Quintet.

== Reception ==
Allmusic awarded the album 4.5 stars, citing Mingus' standout bass playing and noting that "this is the first Mingus recording to feature mostly his own compositions."

== Track listing ==
No.	Title	Writer(s)	Length
1.	"Jump Monk"	Charles Mingus	6:44
2.	"Serenade In Blue"	Mack Gordon, Harry Warren	5:57
3.	"Percussion Discussion"	Mingus, Max Roach	8:25
4.	"Work Song"	Mingus	6:16
5.	"Septemberly"	Al Dubin, Harry Warren / Walter Gross, Jack Lawrence	6:55
6.	"All The Things You C#"	(Jerome Kern, Oscar Hammerstein II / Sergei Rachmaninoff)	6:47

1990 Fantasy, Inc. CD reissue additional tracks:
No.	Title	Length
7.	"Jump Monk (Alternate Take)"	11:38
8.	"All The Things You C# (Alternate Take)"	10:44

Notes:

- "Septemberly" is Mingus' compositional combination of "September in the Rain" by Dubin and Warren, and "Tenderly" by Gross and Lawrence.
- "All The Things You C#" is Mingus' compositional combination of "All The Things You Are" by Kern and Hammerstein, and "Prelude in C-sharp minor" by Rachmaninoff.
- On some reissues, a brief spoken intro and false start are omitted from track 8 for a reduced length of 9:50.

== Personnel ==
- George Barrow - tenor saxophone
- Eddie Bert - trombone
- Mal Waldron - piano
- Charles Mingus - double bass (bass and overdubbed piccolo bass on "Percussion Discussion")
- Willie Jones - drums (except "Percussion Discussion")
- Max Roach - drums (on "Percussion Discussion")

== Sources ==
- Horst Weber, Gerd Filtgen: Charles Mingus. Sein Leben, seine Musik, seine Schallplatten. Oreos, Gauting-Buchendorf, o.J., ISBN 3-923657-05-6
- Marcus A. Woelfle: Liner Notes zu Charles Mingus - 80th Birthday Celebration (Fantasy)
- Richard Cook & Brian Morton: The Penguin Guide To Jazz On CD; Penguin, London, 2002.
- Mal Waldron: Vinyl LP Liner Notes
