= Introducing Paul Bley =

Studio album by Paul Bley
- Released: 1954
- Recorded: November 30, 1953
- Genre: Jazz
- Length: 23:36; 39:43 (CD reissue)
- Labels: Debut; DLP-7

Paul Bley chronology
Introducing Paul Bley (1954)	Paul Bley (1954)

Introducing Paul Bley is the debut album by Canadian jazz pianist Paul Bley. It was recorded for Charles Mingus' Debut label on November 30, 1953 and released on 10" LP the following year.

== Critical reception ==
The AllMusic review by Scott Yanow awarded the album 3 of 5 stars, stating, "Paul Bley may not have been distinctive this early on but he clearly had a potentially strong future".

The Penguin Guide to Jazz called it "that astonishing debut with Mingus and Blakey on which he sounds edgy and a little cautious on the standards but absolutely secure in his technique".

Professional ratings
Review scores
Source	Rating
AllMusic	3/5 stars
The Penguin Guide to Jazz	3.5/4 stars

== Track listing ==
=== Original 10" LP ===
All tracks are written by Paul Bley, except as noted.

Side A
No.	Title	Writer(s)	Length
1.	"Opus 1"		4:08
2.	"Teapot"	Richard Carpenter	4:28
3.	"Like Someone in Love"	Johnny Burke; Jimmy van Heusen	4:03
Total length:			12:39

Side B
No.	Title	Writer(s)	Length
1.	"Spontaneous Combustion"		4:15
2.	"Split Kick"	Horace Silver	3:05
3.	"I Can't Get Started"	Ira Gershwin; Vernon Duke	3:37
Total length:			10:57; 23:36

- times taken from the CD reissue

=== 1992 CD reissue ===
All tracks are written by Paul Bley, except as noted.

No.	Title	Writer(s)	Length
1.	"Opus 1"		4:08
2.	"Opus 1" (alternate take; bonus track)		3:21
3.	"(Teapot) Walkin'"	Carpenter	4:28
4.	"Like Someone in Love"	Burke; van Heusen	4:03
5.	"Spontaneous Combustion"		4:15
6.	"Split Kick"	Horace Silver	3:05
7.	"I Can't Get Started"	Gershwin; Duke	3:37
8.	"Santa Claus Is Coming to Town" (bonus track)	Haven Gillespie; J. Fred Coots	3:22
9.	"The Theme" (bonus track)		3:40
10.	"This Time the Dream's on Me" (bonus track)	Harold Arlen; Johnny Mercer	3:07
11.	"Zootcase" (bonus track)	Zoot Sims	2:33
Total length:			39:43

- Recorded in New York City on November 30, 1953.

== Personnel ==
- Paul Bley – piano
- Charles Mingus – bass
- Art Blakey – drums
