= The Charles Mingus Quintet & Max Roach =

Live album by Charles Mingus

Live album by Charles Mingus
- Released: July 1963
- Recorded: December 23, 1955
- Venue: Café Bohemia
- Genre: Jazz
- Length: 43:02
- Labels: Fantasy Records; Debut

Charles Mingus chronology
Money Jungle (1963)	The Charles Mingus Quintet & Max Roach (1963)	The Black Saint and the Sinner Lady (1963)

Max Roach chronology
Money Jungle (1963)	The Charles Mingus Quintet & Max Roach (1963)	Speak, Brother, Speak! (1963)

The Charles Mingus Quintet & Max Roach is a live album by the jazz composer and bassist Charles Mingus. It was released in July 1963 through Fantasy Records. The recording was made at the Café Bohemia in December 1955. Other material from the concert was earlier released on the album Mingus at the Bohemia in 1956. Max Roach makes a guest appearance on two tracks.

== Reception ==
In his review for AllMusic, Ron Wynn stated: "The Mingus/Roach/Mal Waldron dialogs overcome the ordinary stylings of Eddie Bert and George Barrow."

Professional ratings
Review scores
Source	Rating
AllMusic	4/5 stars
The Penguin Guide to Jazz Recordings	3/4 stars
The Rolling Stone Album Guide	4/5 stars

== Track listing ==
1. "A Foggy Day" (George Gershwin, Ira Gershwin) - 5:36
2. "Drums" (Charles Mingus, Max Roach) - 5:38
3. "Haitian Fight Song" (Mingus) - 5:27
4. "Lady Bird" (Tadd Dameron) - 5:58
5. "I'll Remember April" (Gene de Paul, Patricia Johnston, Don Raye) - 13:13
6. "Love Chant" (Mingus) - 7:26

The actual melody of "I'll Remember April" is not played

== Personnel ==
- George Barrow - tenor sax
- Eddie Bert - trombone
- Mal Waldron - piano
- Charles Mingus - bass
- Willie Jones - drums (except 5)
- Max Roach - drums (tracks 2 and 5)
