= Blue Moods =

1955 studio album by Miles Davis

Studio album by Miles Davis
- Released: 1955
- Recorded: July 9, 1955
- Studio: Van Gelder Studio, Hackensack, New Jersey
- Genre: Jazz, cool jazz
- Length: 26:50
- Label: Debut
- Producer: Charles Mingus

Miles Davis chronology
Musings of Miles (1955)	Blue Moods (1955)	Dig (1956)

Blue Moods is a studio album by Miles Davis, released on Charles Mingus' Debut Records label in late 1955. It brings Miles Davis on trumpet together with Charles Mingus on bass, trombonist Britt Woodman, vibraphonist Teddy Charles, and drummer Elvin Jones.

== Recording and release history ==
The arrangement of "Alone Together" is by Charles Mingus, while the other tracks were arranged by Teddy Charles.

According to the original sleeve notes, the short playing time of the album was because "the recording was cut at 160 lines per inch (instead of the usual 210 to 260 lines per inch) making the grooves wider and deeper and allowing for more area between the grooves for bass frequencies ... and was deemed necessary to reproduce the extended bass range and give the listener more quality to that of high fidelity tape recording."

It was also included in the Charles Mingus Complete Debut Recordings 12CD box-set.

== Critical reception ==
Professional ratings
Review scores
Source	Rating
AllMusic	4/5 stars
The Rolling Stone Jazz Record Guide	4/5 stars
The Penguin Guide to Jazz Recordings	3/4 stars

The AllMusic review by Alex Henderson stated "Blue Moods is an excellent example of cool jazz. However, not all of the musicians who join Davis on this album were full-time members of jazz's cool school... But even so, Blue Moods offers considerable rewards to those who have a taste for '50s cool jazz".

== Track listing ==
Side one
No.	Title	Writer(s)	Length
1.	"Nature Boy"	eden ahbez	6:14
2.	"Alone Together"	Arthur Schwartz, Howard Dietz	7:17

Side two
No.	Title	Writer(s)	Length
1.	"There's No You"	Hal Hopper, Tom Adair	8:06
2.	"Easy Living"	Ralph Rainger, Leo Robin	5:03
Total length:			26:50

== Personnel ==
- Miles Davis – trumpet
- Britt Woodman – trombone
- Charles Mingus – bass
- Elvin Jones – drums
- Teddy Charles – vibraphone
