= Debut Records =

American record label

- Founded: 1952
- Founder: Charles Mingus; Celia Mingus; Max Roach
- Defunct: 1957
- Status: Inactive
- Genre: Jazz
- Country of origin: U.S.
- Location: New York City

Debut Records was an American jazz record company and label founded in 1952 by bassist Charles Mingus, his wife Celia, and drummer Max Roach.

This short-lived label was an attempt to avoid the compromises of working for major companies. Intended to showcase performances by new musicians, only about two dozen albums were issued before the company closed in 1957. Nonetheless, several prominent jazz musicians made their first recordings as leaders for Debut, including pianist Paul Bley, and trumpeters Kenny Dorham and Thad Jones. Saxophonist Hank Mobley made his recording debut on the label, as a sideman with Roach. Teo Macero, later a producer with Miles Davis, recorded his first album as a leader as a saxophonist for Debut, an album described by critic Dan Morgenstern as an oddball fusion of Lennie Tristano and Anton Webern.

Debut was the label on which the Jazz at Massey Hall concert album was first issued. Recorded in Toronto, it features Dizzy Gillespie, Charlie Parker, Bud Powell, Charles Mingus, and Max Roach, and was the last recorded meeting of long-term musical partners Parker and Gillespie.

In 1957, Danish bookseller Ole Vestegaard leased the company's catalogue from Mingus and produced recordings on the Danish Debut label by American jazz musicians who settled in Copenhagen or played at Jazzhus Montmartre.

After Celia and Charles Mingus divorced, Celia married Saul Zaentz in 1960. Charles gave the Zaentzes control of the rights to Debut catalog as a wedding gift. Mingus thought the gift fitting as Celia had handled the bulk of Debut's business affairs, and most of the seed money came from Celia's mother. Zaentz was later head of Fantasy Records, where the Debut recordings were subsequently reissued from 1962–1964.

A 12-CD set of the Debut recordings featuring Mingus, the majority of the label's output, was issued by Fantasy Records in 1990. A four-CD sequence entitled Mingus Rarities (Original Jazz Classics) collected some of the more obscure material featuring Mingus.

== Discography ==
=== Albums ===
==== Debut Ten-inch series ====
Catalog number	Year	Artist	Title	Notes
DLP 1	1953	Charles Mingus/Spaulding Givens	Strings and Keys	
DLP 2	1953	The Quintet	Jazz at Massey Hall, Volume One	live
DLP 3	1953	Bud Powell Trio	Jazz At Massey Hall, Volume Two	live
DLP 4	1953	The Quintet	Jazz at Massey Hall, Volume Three	live
DLP 5	1953	Trombone Rapport	Jazz Workshop, Vol. 1	live
DLP 6	1953	Teo Macero	Explorations	
DLP 7	1954	Paul Bley	Introducing Paul Bley	
DLP 8	1954	Oscar Pettiford	The New Oscar Pettiford Sextet	
DLP 9	1954	Kenny Dorham	Kenny Dorham Quintet	
DLP 10	1954	John LaPorta	The John LaPorta Quintet	
DLP 11	1954	Sam Most	Sam Most Quartet Plus Two	
DLP 12	1954	Thad Jones	The Fabulous Thad Jones	
DLP 13	1955	Max Roach	The Max Roach Quartet featuring Hank Mobley	
DLP 14	1955	Trombone Rapport	Jazz Workshop, Vol. 2	live
DLP 15	1955	Ada Moore	Jazz Workshop, Vol. 3	live
DLP 16	1955	Hazel Scott	Relaxed Piano Moods	
DLP 17	1955	Thad Jones/Charles Mingus	Jazz Collaborations, Vol. 1	

==== Debut Twelve-inch series ====
Catalog number	Year	Artist	Title	Notes
DEB 198	1955	Jazz Workshop	Autobiography in Jazz	
DEB 120	1955	Miles Davis	Blue Moods	
DEB 121	1956?	John Dennis	New Piano Expressions	
DEB 122	1956	John LaPorta	Three Moods	
DEB 123	1956	Charles Mingus	Mingus at the Bohemia	live
DEB 124	1956	The Quintet	Jazz at Massey Hall	live; compiles DLP 2 & DLP 4
DEB 125	1957	Alonzo Levister	Manhattan Monodrama	
DEB 126	1957	Kai Winding + J.J. Johnson	Four Trombones	live; recorded alongside DLP 5 & DLP 14
DEB 127	1958	Thad Jones	Thad Jones	
DEB 128	N/A	Charles Mingus	Chazz!	(UNISSUED); issued in Denmark as DEB 139
DEB 129	N/A	Jimmy Knepper	New Faces	(UNISSUED) some of the material appeared on Debut DL 101 – Danish EP

==== Danish Debut Twelve-inch series ====
Catalog number	Year	Artist	Title	Notes
DEB 130	1960	The Four Trombones	Trombone Rapport	live; compiles DLP 5 & DLP 14
DEB 131	1960	Coleman Hawkins/Bud Powell/Oscar Pettiford/Kenny Clarke	The Essen Jazz Festival All Stars	
DEB 132	1960	Oscar Pettiford and His Jazz Groups	My Little Cello	
DEB 133	1960	The Axen/Jaedig Jazz Groups	Let's Keep the Message	Bent Axen/Bent Jædig
DEB 134	1961	Jorn Elniff	Music for Mice and Men	
DEB 135	1961	Louis Hjulmand & Allan Botschinsky Featuring Oscar Pettiford	Blue Brothers/Blue Bros.	
DEB 136	1962	Eric Dolphy	Eric Dolphy in Europe	live
DEB 137	1962	Brew Moore	Brew Moore in Europe	live
DEB 138	1963	Cecil Taylor	Live at the Cafe Montmartre	live
DEB 139	1963	Charles Mingus	Chazz!	live; recorded concurrently with DEB 123; partially reissued on Fantasy as The Charles Mingus Quintet & Max Roach in 1964
DEB 140	1964	Albert Ayler	My Name Is Albert Ayler	
DEB 141	1964	Sahib Shihab	Sahib's Jazz Party	live
DEB 142	1964	Don Byas	Don Byas' 30th Anniversary Album	
DEB 143	1965	The Contemporary Jazz Quartet Featuring Sonny Murray	Action	
DEB 144	1965	Albert Ayler	Ghosts	reissued on Freedom as Vibrations
SDEB 1145	1965	The Radio Jazz Group	The Radio Jazz Group	
DEB 146	1964?	Albert Ayler	Spirits	reissued on Freedom as Witches & Devils
DEB 147	1965	Paul Bley Trio	Touching	
DEB 1148	1966	Hugh Steinmetz	Nu!	
DEB 148	1965?	Cecil Taylor Jazz Unit	Nefertiti, the Beautiful One Has Come	live
DEB 1149	1967	Bent Jaedig	Bent Jaedig Quintet	
DEB 150	1967	Palle Mikkelborg Og Radio Jazz Gruppen	The Mysterious Corona	
DEB 151	196	The Contemporary Jazz Quintet	T.C.J.Q.	

=== Singles and EPs ===
==== Debut 78 RPM series (10" shellac) ====
Catalog number	Year	Artist	Title	Notes
M-101	1952	Charles Mingus	"Precognition" / "Portrait"	
M-102	1952	Charles Mingus	"Paris in Blue" / "Make Believe"	
M-103	1952	Charles Mingus	"Montage" / "Extrasensory Perception"	
M-104	1953	Hal Mitchell	"Confidentially" / "Mitch's Blues"	
M-105	1953	Max Roach	"Orientation" / "Mobleyzation"	
M-106	1953	Max Roach	"Glow Worm" / "Sfax"	
M-107	1953	Max Roach	"Just One of Those Things" / "Drum Conversation"	
M-108	1953	Max Roach	"Kismet" / "Chi-Chi"	
M-109	1953	Max Roach	"I'm a Fool to Want You" / "Cou-Manchi-Cou"	
M-110	1953	The Gordons with the Hank Jones Trio	"Bebopper" / "Can You Blame Me Me"	
M-111	1953	Honey Gordon with the Hank Jones Trio	"You and Me" / "Cupid"	
M-112	1955	Don Senay with Strings	"The Edge of Love" / "Fanny"	

==== Debut Seven-inch series ====
Catalog number	Year	Artist	Title	Notes
EP-450	1954	Charles Mingus Octet	Charles Mingus Octet	
EP-451	1954	The Max Roach Septet	The Max Roach Septet	reissued on DLP 13 CD reissue

== See also ==
- List of record labels
