= The New Oscar Pettiford Sextet =

Studio album by Oscar Pettiford
- Released: 1954
- Recorded: December 29, 1953; New York City
- Genre: Jazz
- Label: Debut; DLP 8
- Producer: Leonard Feather

Oscar Pettiford chronology
The New Oscar Pettiford Sextet (1954)	Oscar Pettiford Sextet (1954)

The New Oscar Pettiford Sextet is an album by bassist/cellist and composer Oscar Pettiford which was recorded in late 1953 and first issued on the Debut label as a 10-inch LP. The material on the original album was rereleased on Fantasy in 1964 with additional material as My Little Cello.

== Reception ==
Professional ratings
Review scores
Source	Rating
Allmusic	4.5/5 stars
The Rolling Stone Jazz Record Guide	5/5 stars
The Penguin Guide to Jazz Recordings	3/4 stars

The Allmusic review by Rick Anderson states: "most noteworthy of all is the quality of his compositions. 'Pendulum at Falcon's Lair' is a piece of world-class bebop writing, while 'Tamalpais Love Song' is almost classical in its structure, achieving a counterintuitive combination of complexity and simple beauty". In JazzTimes, Duck Baker wrote: "This 1953 date is a highly-arranged, lightly-swinging affair that features nice soloing".

== Track listing ==
All compositions by Oscar Pettiford, except where noted.

1. "The Pendulum at Falcon's Lair" – 4:44
2. "Tamalpais Love Song" – 3:52
3. "Jack, the Fieldstalker" – 4:34
4. "Stockholm Sweetnin'" (Quincy Jones) – 4:14
5. "Low and Behold" – 3:27

== Personnel ==
- Oscar Pettiford – cello (tracks 1 & 3–5), bass (track 2)
- Julius Watkins – French horn
- Phil Urso – tenor saxophone
- Walter Bishop, Jr. – piano
- Charles Mingus – bass (tracks 1 & 3–5)
- Percy Brice – drums
