= Oscar Pettiford =

American jazz bassist and composer (1922–1960)

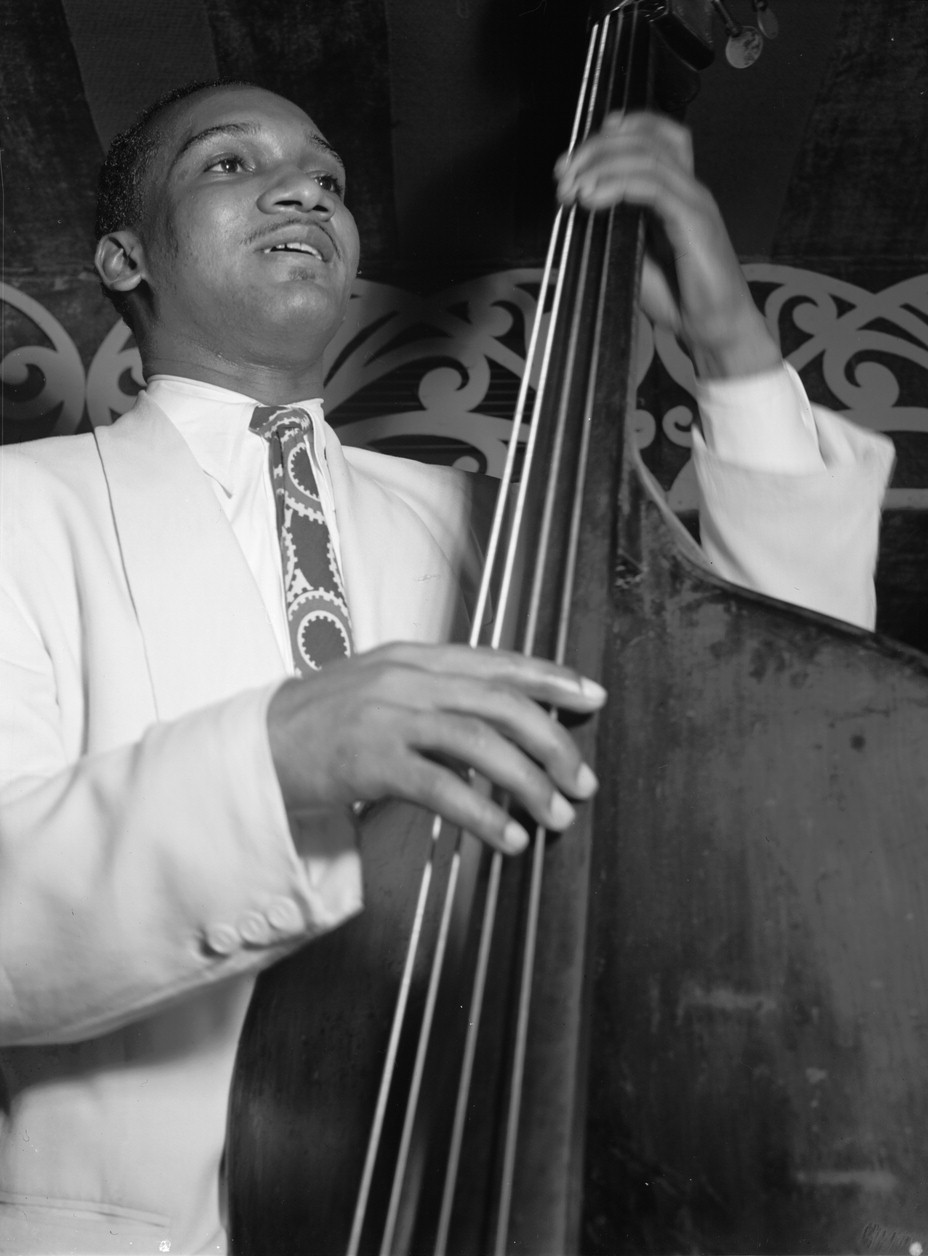
- Pettiford at the Aquarium, New York City, in 1946

Background information
- Born: September 30, 1922; Okmulgee, Oklahoma, U.S.
- Died: September 8, 1960 (aged 37) Copenhagen, Denmark
- Genres: Jazz, bebop, third stream
- Occupations: Musician, composer
- Instruments: Double bass, cello
- Years active: 1942–1960
- Labels: Debut, Bethlehem, ABC

Oscar Pettiford (September 30, 1922 – September 8, 1960) was an American jazz double bassist and composer. He was one of the earliest musicians to work in the bebop idiom.

Jazz bassist Christian McBride called Pettiford "probably the most important bass player of that bebop generation in terms of creating new language for the bass."

== Early life ==
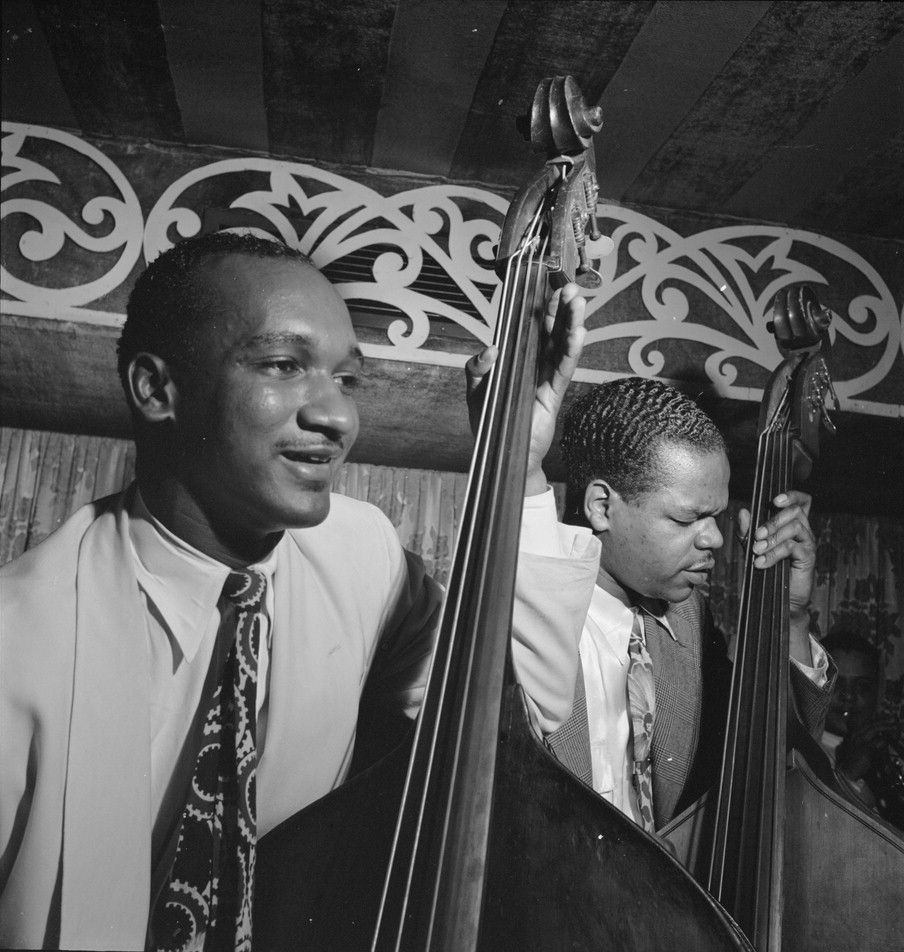
Pettiford (left) and Junior Raglin at the Aquarium of New York City, November 1946

Pettiford was born in Okmulgee, Oklahoma, United States. His mother identified as being of Choctaw descent, and his father Harry "Doc" Pettiford identified as half Cherokee and half African-American.

He grew up playing in the family band, in which he sang and danced before switching to piano at the age of 12, then to double bass when he was 14. Jamela Pettiford, a singer in St. Paul, Minnesota, and a descendant of the Pettiford family, told Minnesota Public Radio in 2022 that the Pettiford family band traveled itinerantly for a time as road musicians before settling in north Minneapolis.

Pettiford is quoted as saying that he did not like the way people were playing the bass, so he developed his own way of playing it. Despite being admired by the likes of Milt Hinton at the age of 14, he gave up in 1941 because he did not believe he could make a living. Five months later, he once again met Hinton, who persuaded him to return to music.

== Career ==
In 1942, Pettiford joined the Charlie Barnet band and in 1943 gained wider public attention after recording with Coleman Hawkins on his "The Man I Love". Pettiford also recorded with Earl Hines and Ben Webster around this time. After he moved to New York, he was one of the musicians (together with Dizzy Gillespie, Thelonious Monk, Kenny Clarke) who in the early 1940s jammed at Minton's Playhouse, where the music style developed that was later called bebop. Pettiford and Dizzy Gillespie led a bop group in 1943. In 1945, Pettiford went with Hawkins to California, where he appeared in The Crimson Canary, a mystery movie known for its jazz soundtrack, which also featured Josh White. He then worked with Duke Ellington from 1945 to 1948 and for Woody Herman in 1949, before working mainly as a leader in the 1950s.

As a leader, he inadvertently discovered Cannonball Adderley. After one of his musicians had tricked him into letting Adderley, an unknown music teacher, onto the stand, he had Adderley solo on a demanding piece, on which Adderley performed impressively.

Pettiford is considered the pioneer of the cello as a solo instrument in jazz music. He first played the cello as a practical joke on his band leader Woody Herman. In the middle of a double bass solo, Pettiford surprised everyone by abruptly exiting the stage; soon thereafter, he further surprised Herman and the rest of his bandmates by returning to the bandstand with a cello, on which he played the remainder of his solo. Later, after suffering a broken arm in 1949, Pettiford found it impossible to play his bass, so he experimented with a cello a friend had lent him. Tuning it in fourths, like a double bass, but one octave higher, Pettiford found it possible to perform during his rehabilitation (during which time his arm was in a sling), and made his first recordings with the instrument in 1950. The cello thus became his secondary instrument, and he continued to perform and record with it throughout the remainder of his career.

He recorded extensively during the 1950s for the Debut, Bethlehem, and ABC Paramount labels, among others. During the mid-1950s, he played on the first three albums that Thelonious Monk recorded for the Riverside label.

Between 1954 and 1958, Pettiford also led sextets, big bands, and jazz orchestras which played dates in Manhattan venues like Birdland, where he continued to explore unusual instrumental voicing including French horns and harp. The reedist and composer Gigi Gryce collaborated with Pettiford on the novel arrangements for the orchestra's hi-fi albums.

In 1958, Pettiford moved to Copenhagen, Denmark, and started recording for European companies. After his move to Europe, he often performed with European musicians, such as Attila Zoller, and also with other Americans who had settled in Europe, including Bud Powell and Kenny Clarke.

Pettiford's influence on bassists of later generations is frequently noted; his composition "Tricotism" is a standard piece of jazz bass repertoire, and has been recorded by bassists from several different generations, including Ray Brown, Milt Hinton, Rufus Reid, John Clayton, Bill Crow, Yasushi Nakamura, and others.

== Death ==
Pettiford died in 1960 in Copenhagen, shortly before his 38th birthday, from a virus closely related to polio.

== Discography ==
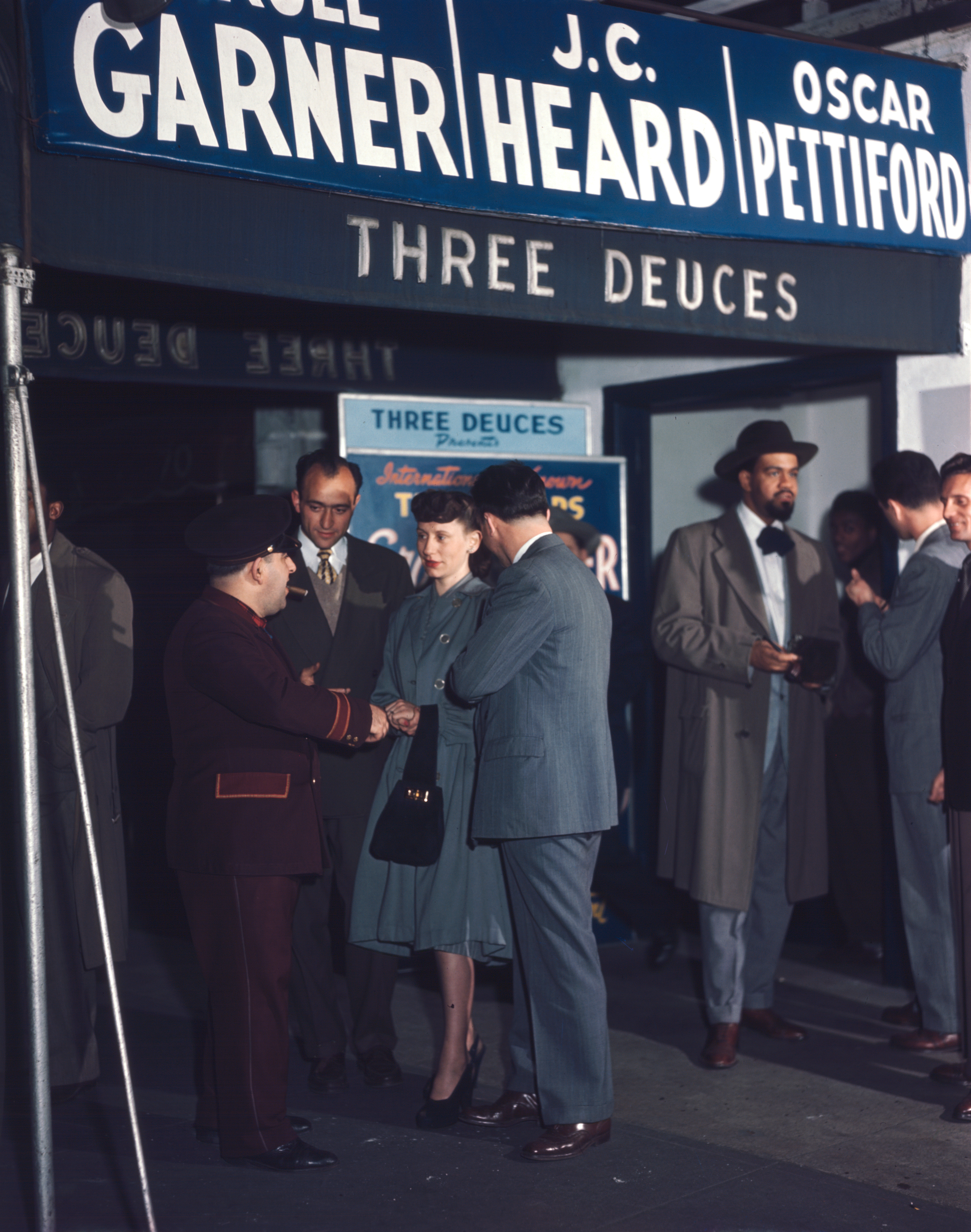
Pettiford headlining with Erroll Garner and J. C. Heard at Three Deuces nightclub on 52nd Street, July 1948 (photograph by William P. Gottlieb).

=== As leader ===
- Bass Hits (Topaz, 1943–46)
- The New Oscar Pettiford Sextet (Debut, 1953)
- Oscar Pettiford Sextet (Vogue, 1954)
- Oscar Pettiford (Bethlehem, 1954)
- Basically Duke (Bethlehem, 1954)
- Another One (Bethlehem, 1955)
- Oscar Pettiford Volume 2 (1956)
- The Oscar Pettiford Orchestra in Hi-Fi (ABC-Paramount, 1956)
- The Oscar Pettiford Orchestra in Hi-Fi Volume Two (ABC-Paramount, 1957)
- Discoveries (Savoy, 1952-57 [1986])
- Winner's Circle (Bethlehem, 1957) with John Coltrane
- Vienna Blues – The Complete Session (Black Lion, 1959) with Hans Koller, Attila Zoller, Jimmy Pratt
- The Complete Essen Jazz Festival Concert, (Black Lion, 1960) with Coleman Hawkins, Bud Powell, Kenny Clarke
- My Little Cello (Debut, 1960) also released as Last Recordings of the Late Great Bassist and Montmartre Blues
- First Bass (IAJRC, 1953-60 [2000])
- Blue Brothers, (Black Lion, 1959-60 [1973])

=== As sideman ===
- Ralph Burns and Leonard Feather: Winter Sequence (MGM, 1954)
- Kenny Burrell: Swingin' (Blue Note, 1956 [rel. 1980])
- Art Blakey: Drum Suite (Columbia, 1957)
- The Birdlanders: Vol. 2 (OJC, 1954) with Kai Winding, Al Cohn, Tal Farlow, Duke Jordan, Max Roach, Denzil Best
- Sid Catlett: 1944–1946 (Classics)
- Teddy Charles: 3 for Duke (Jubilee/London,1957)
- Jimmy Cleveland: Introducing Jimmy Cleveland and His All Stars (EmArcy, 1955)
- Earl Coleman: Earl Coleman Returns (Prestige, 1956)
- Chris Connor & John Lewis Quartet: Chris Connor (Atlantic)
- Miles Davis: The Musings of Miles (Prestige)
- Miles Davis: Miles Davis Volume 1/Miles Davis Volume 2 (Blue Note, 1952–54)
- Kenny Dorham: Jazz Contrasts (OJC, 1957) Afro-Cuban (Blue Note, 1955)
- Duke Ellington: Carnegie Hall Concert January 1946 (Prestige)
- Duke Ellington: Carnegie Hall Concert December 1947 (Prestige); 1947–1948 (Classics), 1949–1950 (Classics), Great Times! (OJC, 1950) (includes "Perdido", "Blues for Blanton")
- Tal Farlow: Jazz Masters 41 (Verve 1955–58); Finest Hour (Verve, 1955–58)
- Leonard Feather: 1937–1945 (Classics)
- Dizzy Gillespie: 1945 (Classics)
- Urbie Green: East Coast Series Vol. 6 (Bethlehem, 1956)
- Jimmy Hamilton & The New York Jazz Quintet (Fresh Sound Rec.)
- Coleman Hawkins: Rainbow Mist (Delmark, 1944 [1992]), The Hawk Flies High (OJC, 1957)
- Ernie Henry: Last Chorus (Riverside, 1956–57)
- Woody Herman: Keeper Of the Flame (Capitol, 1948–49)
- Earl Hines Trio: Fats Waller Memorial (Signature SI-l-lA/B etc.)
- Johnny Hodges: Caravan (Prestige, 1947–51)
- Helen Humes: 1927–1945 (Classics)
- Milt Jackson: Ballads & Blues (Atlantic, 1956)
- Milt Jackson: Plenty, Plenty Soul (Atlantic, 1957)
- Milt Jackson: "Soul Brothers" (with Ray Charles) (Atlantic, 1958)
- Lee Konitz / Warne Marsh Quintet (Atlantic, 1955)
- Herbie Mann: Sultry Serenade (Riverside, 1957), Salute to the Flute (Epic, 1957)
- Helen Merrill: Helen Merrill (Emarcy, 1954), Dream of You (Emarcy, 1957)
- Thelonious Monk: Thelonious Monk Plays Duke Ellington (Riverside, 1955), The Unique Thelonious Monk (Riverside, 1956), Brilliant Corners (Riverside, 1956)
- Phineas Newborn, Jr.: Here Is Phineas (Atlantic, 1956)
- Joe Newman & Zoot Sims: Locking Horns (Rama, 1957)
- Leo Parker: Prestige First Sessions: Volume 1 (Prestige, 1950)
- Red Rodney: Red Rodney (ONYX 1957)
- Max Roach: Deeds, Not Words (Riverside, 1958)
- Joe Roland: Joltin' Joe Roland (Savoy, 1955)
- Sonny Rollins: Freedom Suite (Riverside, 1958)
- Charlie Rouse: Les Jazz Modes (Dawn, 1956)
- Sahib Shihab: Jazz Sahib (Savoy, 1957)
- Sonny Stitt: Sonny Stitt Plays Arrangements from the Pen of Quincy Jones (Roost, 1955)
- Billy Strayhorn: Great Times! (Riverside, 1950)
- Art Tatum: The Art Of Tatum (ASV, 32-44)
- Clark Terry: Clark Terry (EmArcy, 1955)
- Lucky Thompson: Accent on Tenor Sax (FSR, 1954)
- Lucky Thompson: Tricotism (Impulse, 1956)
- George Wallington: The George Wallington Trios (Prestige, 1952–53)
- Julius Watkins: Julius Watkins Sextet (Blue Note, 1954–55)
