= Mingus Mingus Mingus Mingus Mingus =

Studio album by Charles Mingus
- Released: January 9, 1964
- Recorded: January 20 & September 20, 1963; New York City
- Genre: Jazz
- Length: 40:18
- Labels: Impulse! A-54
- Producer: Bob Thiele

Charles Mingus chronology
The Black Saint and the Sinner Lady (1963)	Mingus Mingus Mingus Mingus Mingus (1964)	Tonight at Noon (1964)

Professional ratings
Review scores
Source	Rating
AllMusic	5/5 stars
The Penguin Guide to Jazz Recordings	3.5/4 stars
The Rolling Stone Jazz Record Guide	4/5 stars

Mingus Mingus Mingus Mingus Mingus is a studio album by the American jazz composer and bassist Charles Mingus which was released on January 9, 1964.

== Background ==
Mingus collaborated with arranger/orchestrator Bob Hammer to score the music for a large ensemble of brass and saxophones.

Most of the compositions on this album have appeared on other Mingus recording, though some under different titles and/or drastically different arrangements:

- "II B.S." as "Haitian Fight Song" on Plus Max Roach and The Clown
- "I X Love" as "Duke's Choice" on A Modern Jazz Symposium of Music and Poetry.
- "Celia" on East Coasting
- "Mood Indigo" (Barney Bigard, Duke Ellington) on Mingus Dynasty
- "Better Get Hit in Yo' Soul" as "Better Git It in Your Soul" on Mingus Ah Um (also "Better Git Hit in Your Soul" on Mingus at Antibes)
- "Theme for Lester Young" as "Goodbye Pork Pie Hat" on Mingus Ah Um
- "Hora Decubitus" as "E's Flat, Ah's Flat Too" on Blues & Roots
- "Freedom" on The Complete Town Hall Concert (1962)

== Track listing ==
Adapted from 1995 CD reissue; many original LP copies have incorrect durations listed. All tracks composed by Charles Mingus, except where noted.

Side one
No.	Title	Length
1.	"II B.S."	4:46
2.	"I X Love"	7:38
3.	"Celia"	6:12
4.	"Mood Indigo (by Duke Ellington and Barney Bigard)"	4:43

Side two
No.	Title	Length
1.	"Better Get Hit in Yo' Soul"	6:28
2.	"Theme for Lester Young"	5:50
3.	"Hora Decubitus"	4:41
Total length:		40:18

Bonus track on reissues
No.	Title	Length
1.	"Freedom"	5:10
Total length:		45:28

== Personnel ==
Tracks #1 and 4–8, recorded on September 20, 1963:

- Eddie Preston – trumpet
- Richard Williams – trumpet
- Britt Woodman – trombone
- Don Butterfield – tuba
- Jerome Richardson – soprano and baritone saxophone, flute
- Dick Hafer – tenor saxophone, clarinet, flute
- Booker Ervin – tenor saxophone
- Eric Dolphy – alto saxophone, flute, bass clarinet
- Jaki Byard – piano
- Charles Mingus – bass, narration ("Freedom")
- Walter Perkins – drums
- Bob Hammer – arranger and orchestrator

Tracks #2 and 3, recorded on January 20, 1963:

- Rolf Ericson – trumpet
- Richard Williams – trumpet
- Quentin Jackson – trombone
- Don Butterfield – tuba
- Jerome Richardson – soprano and baritone saxophone, flute
- Dick Hafer – tenor saxophone, flute, oboe
- Charlie Mariano – alto saxophone
- Jaki Byard – piano
- Jay Berliner – guitar
- Charles Mingus – bass, piano
- Dannie Richmond – drums
- Bob Hammer – arranger and orchestrator

=== Production ===
- Bob Thiele – producer
- Michael Cuscuna – reissue Producer
- Bob Simpson – engineer
- Erick Labson – remastering
