= The Complete Town Hall Concert =

Live album by Charles Mingus
- Released: 1962; 1994 CD reissue with bonus tracks
- Recorded: October 12, 1962
- Genre: Jazz
- Label: United Artists UAJ 14024; Blue Note CDP 7243

Charles Mingus chronology
Money Jungle (1962)	The Complete Town Hall Concert (1962)	The Black Saint and the Sinner Lady (1963)

Original album cover

The Complete Town Hall Concert is a live album by the American jazz musician Charles Mingus released on Blue Note label 1994. It was recorded at the Town Hall in New York City in 1962. Some tracks were previously released on the United Artists label in 1962 as Town Hall Concert (not to be confused with the 1964 live album of the same name).

The concert was conceived as a "live workshop" of newly composed music which would be recorded for release by United Artists but rescheduling, lack of rehearsal time, poor sound and interruptions led to the event and subsequent album being considered a disaster.

Multi-instrumentalist Buddy Collette, who was Mingus' childhood mentor and also present in the orchestra, stated that Mingus and the date's organizer, George Wein, were at odds from the beginning. Wein wanted it to be a concert while Mingus envisioned an open recording session where he would explain to the audience what the musicians were doing. Mingus threatened multiple times to quit during rehearsals as he did not want a concert.

Much of the music intended for the performance was finally realized by conductor Gunther Schuller in a concert in 1989 as Epitaph.

== Reception ==
The AllMusic review by Scott Yanow stated: "Charles Mingus's Town Hall Concert has long been considered a famous fiasco, and the original United Artists LP (which contained just 36 minutes of music and did not bother identifying the personnel) made matters worse. But this 1994 Blue Note CD does its best to clean up the mess."

The English rock band Radiohead cited The Complete Town Hall Concert as a major influence on their 2000 album Kid A. The songwriter, Thom Yorke, described it as "just fucking chaos... There's this incredible tension and it was the most formative record of the whole time."

Professional ratings
Review scores
Source	Rating
AllMusic	3/5 stars
The Penguin Guide to Jazz Recordings	3/4 stars
The Rolling Stone Jazz Record Guide	3/5 stars

== Track listing ==
All compositions by Charles Mingus except as indicated

1. "Freedom Part 1" - 3:47
2. "Freedom Part 2" - 3:14
3. "Osmotin'" - 2:50 Bonus track on CD reissue
4. "Epitaph Part 1" - 7:03
5. "Peggy's Blue Skylight" - 5:21 Bonus track on CD reissue
6. "Epitaph Part 2" - 5:10
7. "My Search" - 8:09
8. "Portrait" - 4:34 Bonus track on CD reissue
9. "Duke's Choice" - 5:12
10. "Please Don't Come Back from the Moon" - 7:24 Bonus track on CD reissue
11. "In a Mellow Tone" (Duke Ellington, Milt Gabler) - 8:21
12. "Epitaph Part 1" [alternate take] - 7:23 Bonus track on CD reissue

== Personnel ==
- Charles Mingus - bass, narration
- Ed Armour, Rolf Ericson, Lonnie Hillyer, Ernie Royal, Clark Terry, Richard Williams, Snooky Young - trumpet
- Eddie Bert, Jimmy Cleveland, Willie Dennis, Paul Faulise, Quentin Jackson, Britt Woodman - trombone
- Romeo Penque - oboe
- Danny Bank - bass clarinet
- Buddy Collette, Eric Dolphy, Charlie Mariano, Charles McPherson - alto saxophone
- George Berg, Zoot Sims - tenor saxophone
- Pepper Adams, Jerome Richardson - baritone saxophone
- Warren Smith - vibraphone, percussion
- Toshiko Akiyoshi, Jaki Byard – piano
- Les Spann - guitar
- Milt Hinton - bass
- Dannie Richmond - drums
- Grady Tate - percussion
- Bob Hammer, Gene Roland - arranger
- Melba Liston - arranger, conductor
