= Live at Jazz Standard (Mingus Big Band album) =

Mingus Big Band Live at Jazz Standard

Live album by Mingus Big Band
- Released: April 22, 2010
- Recorded: December 31, 2009
- Venue: Jazz Standard, New York City
- Genre: Jazz, big band
- Length: 71:53
- Label: Jazz Workshop, Inc., Sue Mingus Music
- Producer: Seth Abramson, Sue Mingus

Mingus Big Band chronology
Live in Tokyo at the Blue Note (2006)	Mingus Big Band Live at Jazz Standard (2010)	Mingus Sings (2015)

Live at Jazz Standard is an album by the Mingus Big Band that won the Grammy Award for Best Large Jazz Ensemble Album in 2011. The album documents a concert at the Jazz Standard club in New York City on New Year's Eve, 2009. The concert and the album commemorate the fiftieth anniversary of songs recorded by Charles Mingus. The band was conducted by Gunther Schuller and included trumpeter Randy Brecker, who played with Mingus during the 1970s.

== Track listing ==
All tracks are written by Charles Mingus

No.	Title	Length
1.	"Gunslinging Bird"	7:31
2.	"New Now Know How"	5:58
3.	"Self-Portrait in Three Colors"	2:52
4.	"Bird Calls"	5:50
5.	"E's Flat Ah's Flat Too (aka "Hora Decubitus")"	7:08
6.	"Cryin' Blues"	7:35
7.	"Open Letter to Duke"	7:12
8.	"Moanin'"	9:34
9.	"Goodbye Pork Pie Hat"	5:51
10.	"Song with Orange"	12:22

== Personnel ==
- Gunther Schuller – conductor
- Douglas Yates – soprano saxophone, alto saxophone
- Vincent Herring – alto saxophone
- Abraham Burton – tenor saxophone
- Wayne Escoffery – tenor saxophone
- Lauren Sevian – baritone saxophone
- Conrad Herwig – trombone
- Frank Lacy – trombone
- Earl McIntyre – bass trombone
- Earl Gardner – trumpet
- Kenny Rampton – trumpet
- Randy Brecker – trumpet
- Earl McIntyre – tuba
- Boris Kozlov – bass
- Jeff "Tain" Watts – drums
- David Kikoski – piano
- Seth Abramson – producer
- Sue Mingus – producer
