= The Shoes of the Fisherman's Wife Are Some Jiveass Slippers =

Classical jazz composition

"The Shoes of the Fisherman's Wife Are Some Jive Ass Slippers" is a composition by Charles Mingus released on his 1972 album Let My Children Hear Music. "The Shoes of the Fisherman's Wife", as it is sometimes referred to, is a rearrangement of the song "Once Upon a Time, There Was a Holding Corporation Called Old America," recorded on Mingus' 1965 live album Music Written For Monterey 1965. Not Heard... Played In Its Entirety At UCLA.

The main melody of "Shoes" follows an ascending chromatic chord pattern, presented in multiple separate tempos. Sy Johnson is credited with the orchestration, transcription and arrangement, as well conducting for the recording on Let My Children Hear Music.
