= Tijuana Moods =

Studio album by Charles Mingus
- Released: June 1962
- Recorded: July 18 & August 6, 1957
- Genre: Jazz; post-bebop; flamenco jazz
- Length: 35:15
- Label: RCA
- Producer: Bob Rolontz

Charles Mingus chronology
Oh Yeah (1962)	Tijuana Moods (1962)	Money Jungle (1963)

Tijuana Moods is an album by Charles Mingus, recorded in 1957 but not released until June 1962. This delay was due to a legal dispute with RCA. The album was reissued in 1986 on CD as New Tijuana Moods with four additional alternate takes and as a double LP with five alternate takes. Two-CD expanded versions with further alternate takes were issued by RCA in 2000 and by Columbia in 2010.

In his notes to the 1986 reissue, Ed Michel said that "[h]ardly anything was recorded as a complete take" and so both the originally issued takes and the alternate versions had been assembled by editing additional sections into base takes.

The name "Charlie Mingus" appears on the cover of the original album. Mingus hated all nicknames derived from Charles. ("Don't call me Charlie; that's not a man's name, that's a name for a horse.")

== Reception ==
Professional ratings
Review scores
Source	Rating
AllMusic	5/5 stars
Tom Hull	A
The Penguin Guide to Jazz Recordings	2000 expanded edition
The Rolling Stone Jazz Record Guide	5/5 stars

- DownBeat (p. 80) - 4 stars out of 5 -- "[Tijuana Moods is] the 1957 masterpiece on which Mingus asserts full control over his longform chops."
- DownBeat (12/01, p. 90) - 4.5 stars out of 5 - "This collection allows us to observe Mingus in the midst of his truly creative process."
- Uncut (8/01, p. 96) - 5 stars out of 5 - "[A] mindblowing collection....Its breathtaking scope prefigures many innovations made under the rock rubric in the Sixties."

== Track listing ==
All compositions by Charles Mingus except where noted.

1. "Dizzy Moods"
2. "Ysabel's Table Dance"
3. "Tijuana Gift Shop"
4. "Los Mariachis (The Street Musicians)"
5. "Flamingo" (Ted Grouya)

=== Track listing of New Tijuana Moods (1986) ===
1. "Dizzy Moods"
2. "Ysabel's Table Dance"
3. "Tijuana Gift Shop"
4. "Los Mariachis"
5. "Flamingo"
6. "Dizzy Moods (Alternate Take)"
7. "Tijuana Gift Shop (Alternate Take)"
8. "Los Mariachis (Alternate Take)"
9. "Flamingo (Alternate Take)"

=== Track listing of New Tijuana Moods (1986) 2-LP Version ===
1. "Dizzy Moods" (5:47)
2. "Ysabel's Table Dance" (10:24)
3. "Tijuana Gift Shop" (3:44)
4. "Los Mariachis" (10:18)
5. "Flamingo" (5:31)
6. "Dizzy Moods (Alternate Take)" (8:17)
7. "Ysabel's Table Dance (Alternate Take)" (12:57)
8. "Tijuana Gift Shop (Alternate Take)" (4:39)
9. "Los Mariachis (Alternate Take)" (12:23)
10. "Flamingo (Alternate Take)" (6:37)

=== Track listing of 2000 Expanded Edition ===
Released on RCA Victor Gold Series (catalog number 74321749992)

Disc 1

1. "Dizzy Moods"
2. "Ysabel's Table Dance"
3. "Tijuana Gift Shop"
4. "Los Mariachis (The Street Musicians)"
5. "Flamingo"
6. "A Colloquial Dream (Scenes in the City)"

Disc 2

1. "Dizzy Moods (Alternate Take)"
2. "Ysabel's Table Dance (Alternate Take)"
3. "Tijuana Gift Shop (Alternate Take)"
4. "Los Mariachis (Alternate Take)"
5. "Flamingo (Alternate Take)"
6. "A Colloquial Dream (Alternate Take)"

=== Track listing of 2001 Expanded Edition ===
Released on Columbia/Legacy (catalog number 88697694392 and 88697979592-1&2). Same track listing on 2001 Blue Bird First Editions (09026638402).

Disc 1

1. "Dizzy Moods"
2. "Ysabel's Table Dance"
3. "Tijuana Gift Shop"
4. "Los Mariachis"
5. "Flamingo"
6. "Dizzy Moods (Alternate Take)"
7. "Ysabel's Table Dance (Alternate Take)"
8. "Los Mariachis (Alternate Take)"
9. "Flamingo (Alternate Take)"

Disc 2

1. "Tijuana Gift Shop (Alternate Take)"
2. "A Colloquial Dream"
3. "Flamingo (Alternate Take)"
4. "Ysabel's Table Dance (Composite Incomplete Take)"
5. "Dizzy Moods (Junkyard Take 8)"
6. "Dizzy Moods (Bass Solos Take 14)"
7. "Tijuana Gift Shop (Alternate Takes 1-4)"
8. "Tijuana Gift Shop (Alternate Take 6)"
9. "Los Mariachis (Take 1-3)"
10. "Los Mariachis (Take 5-10)"
11. "Los Mariachis (Take 15-23)"
12. "A Colloquial Dream (Take 6)"
13. "A Colloquial Dream (Take 8)"

== Personnel ==
- Charles Mingus, leader, bass
- Clarence Shaw, trumpet
- Jimmy Knepper, trombone
- Shafi Hadi, alto saxophone, tenor saxophone
- Bill Triglia, piano
- Dannie Richmond, drums
- Ysabel Morel, castanets, vocals
- Frankie Dunlop, percussion
- Lonne Elder III, vocals
