= Honi Gordon =

American jazz musician

Honi Gordon (sometimes Honey Gordon) (born August 16, 1938) is an American jazz vocalist.

== Career ==
Gordon was born on August 16, 1938. Her father, George Gordon Sr, wrote music for her from when she was 10. She had two brothers, George and Richie. With her father and brothers, Gordon sang as a member of the Gordons in the early 1950s. Her first recordings, in 1953, were with them and Hank Jones (piano), Charles Mingus (bass), and Max Roach (drums). They were released on Debut Records' Autobiography in Jazz. The Gordons also appeared on recordings led by Lionel Hampton in 1956, and on the album Dizzy Gillespie and Stuff Smith in 1957.

Gordon herself sang on a few tracks led by Eddie Jefferson in 1959. In 1962 she recorded, as a leader, the album Honi Gordon Sings, for Prestige Records. This included well-known jazz musicians – Makanda Ken McIntyre (alto sax, flute), Wally Richardson (guitar), Jaki Byard (piano), George Duvivier (bass), and Ed Shaughnessy (drums). This was her only album as leader. The Gordons recorded together again the following year, this time on Mary Lou Williams' Black Christ of the Andes, but the group was not commercially successful and broke up, with Honi Gordon pursuing a solo career.

Gordon again recorded with Williams in 1967. In 1972 and 1973 she appeared on recordings led by Mingus. These were released principally as the albums Charles Mingus and Friends in Concert and Mingus Moves. Early in 1972 she also sang on Mary Lou's Mass, which was led by Williams. Gordon reprised some of the material from this session in a 2007 memorial Mass for Williams.

== Singing style ==
The AllMusic biographer observed that Gordon "had an appealing style that was influenced by Sarah Vaughan, Ella Fitzgerald, and Billie Holiday, as well as Annie Ross. There were also hints of Chris Connor in some of her performances." Gordon was bebop-influenced in style.

== Discography ==
- Honi Gordon Sings (Prestige, 1962)
