= Charles Mingus Sextet In Berlin =

Live album by Charles Mingus
- Released: 1970
- Recorded: 5 November 1970
- Genre: Jazz
- Label: Beppo 508

Charles Mingus chronology
Charles Mingus in Paris: The Complete America Session (1970)	Charles Mingus Sextet In Berlin (1970)	Mingus at Antibes (1974)

Charles Mingus Sextet In Berlin is an unauthorized live album by American jazz bassist Charles Mingus recorded on 5 November 1970, Berlin, West Germany, together with his sextet. The status of this recording is unknown.

== Track listing ==
All tracks are written by Charles Mingus.

No.	Title	Length
1.	"History"	8:15
2.	"O.P."	10:48
3.	"Reincarnation of a Lovebird"	10:52
4.	"The Man Who Never Sleeps"	13:15

== Personnel ==
- Charles Mingus – bass
- Charles McPherson – alto saxophone
- Dannie Richmond – drums
- Jaki Byard – piano
- Bobby Jones – tenor saxophone, clarinet
- Eddie Preston – trumpet
