= Shafi Hadi =

American jazz saxophonist (1929–1976)

- Also known as: Shafi Hadi
- Born: William Curtis Porter; September 21, 1929; Philadelphia, Pennsylvania, U.S.
- Died: June 1976 (aged 46)
- Genre: Jazz
- Occupation: Saxophonist
- Formerly of: Charles Mingus, Hank Mobley

William Curtis Porter (September 21, 1929 – June 1976), better known as Shafi Hadi, was an American jazz tenor and alto saxophonist known for his recordings with Charles Mingus and with Hank Mobley.

== Biography ==
Hadi was born as William Curtis Porter in Philadelphia, Pennsylvania on September 21, 1929. The 1930 Census indicated his parents were William Porter and Harrietti Porter. At age 6, he received piano lessons from his grandmother. Later, he studied musical composition at Howard University and University of Detroit. Hadi performed with rhythm and blues artists such as Paul Williams, Ruth Brown, and the Griffin Brothers.

Hadi recorded with bassist Charles Mingus between 1956 and 1958. He also recorded with tenor saxophonist Hank Mobley. Hadi improvised the soundtrack music for John Cassavetes's film Shadows, then returned to Mingus's group in 1959. He also collaborated with Mary Lou Williams on her 1977 composition "Shafi", although the extent of Hadi's contribution is unclear. The 1977 Copyright filing EU841296 by Mary Lou Williams credited words to Hadi, pseud. of Shafi Porter, with music and arrangement credited to Mary Lou Williams.

During the 1950s, Hadi was also active in painting. Between 1965 and 1969 he co-wrote five songs with Lionel Hampton or Gladys Hampton: Bye, Bye, Hamp Stamps, No, Say No, A Sketch Of Gladys, and Mama Knows.

Hadi died in June 1976, at the age of 46.

== Playing style ==
Brian Priestley describes Hadi's performance style as a "distinctive mixture of bop and blues, combined with a very individual tone." Martin Williams, writing in 1958, described Hadi's playing as being "both contemporary and a reflection of an apprenticeship in rhythm and blues bands."

== Discography ==
=== As leader ===
- Debut Rarities, Vol. 3 (1957, Original Jazz Classics) – Shafi Hadi Sextet

=== As sideman ===
With Langston Hughes

- Weary Blues (MGM, 1958)

With Charles Mingus

- The Clown (1957; Atlantic Records)
- Tijuana Moods (1957; (issued 1962) RCA Records)
- East Coasting (1957; Bethlehem Records)
- A Modern Jazz Symposium of Music and Poetry (1957; Bethlehem)
- Mingus Ah Um (1959; Columbia Records)
- Tonight at Noon (1961; Atlantic)

With Hank Mobley

- Hank Mobley (1957; Blue Note Records)
