= The Black Saint and the Sinner Lady =

Studio album by Charles Mingus
- Released: July 1963
- Recorded: January 20, 1963
- Studio: Atlantic (New York City)
- Genre: Avant-garde jazz; third stream; experimental big band
- Length: 39:25
- Label: Impulse!
- Producer: Bob Thiele

Charles Mingus chronology
The Charles Mingus Quintet & Max Roach (1963)	The Black Saint and the Sinner Lady (1963)	Mingus Mingus Mingus Mingus Mingus (1964)

The Black Saint and the Sinner Lady is a studio album by Charles Mingus. It was recorded on January 20, 1963, and released in July of that year by Impulse! Records. The album comprises a single continuous composition—partially written as a ballet—divided into four tracks and six movements. It is widely regarded as one of the greatest jazz records of all time.

== Recording ==
The album was recorded on January 20, 1963 by an eleven-piece band. Mingus has called the album's orchestral style "ethnic folk-dance music", and has been described by critics as blending "jazz and classical but also integrates elements of African music and Spanish themes." The album features liner notes written by Mingus and his then-psychotherapist, Edmund Pollock.

Bob Hammer was co-orchestrator and arranger for the album. In the book The Penguin Jazz Guide: The History of the Music in the 10 Best Albums, Sue Mingus says: "In some fashion, Charles absorbed Bob Hammer's rehearsal band for a six-weeks gig he had at the Village Vanguard in 1963, which provided a unique opportunity to work out, night after night, one of his greatest compositions, The Black Saint and The Sinner Lady."

In the book Mingus Speaks, arranger Sy Johnson recollects: "Bob Hammer was very successful at that. He's a piano player, who was around here, in 1962 or something like that, when he did Mingus's masterpiece, as far as I concerned, a brilliant piece of orchestration and brilliant performance of The Black Saint and The Sinner Lady".

== Reception ==
Professional ratings
Review scores
Source	Rating
Down Beat (Original LP release)	4/5 stars
All About Jazz	favorable
AllMusic	5/5 stars
Penguin Guide to Jazz	4/4 stars
Q	4/5 stars
The Rolling Stone Jazz Record Guide	5/5 stars

The Black Saint and the Sinner Lady is among the most acclaimed jazz records of the 20th century. The album is often characterized by jazz and music critics as one of Mingus's two major masterworks (the other being Mingus Ah Um) and has frequently ranked highly on lists of the best albums of all time. Richard Cook and Brian Morton, writers of The Penguin Guide to Jazz, awarded the album a "Crown" token, the publication's highest accolade, in addition to the highest four-star rating. Steve Huey of AllMusic awards The Black Saint and the Sinner Lady five stars out of five and describes the album as "one of the greatest achievements in orchestration by any composer in jazz history." Q magazine describes the album as "a mixture of haunting bluesiness, dancing vivacity, and moments of Andalusian heat" and awards it four of five stars.

The album was included in Robert Dimery's 1001 Albums You Must Hear Before You Die.

== Track listing ==
All tracks are written by Charles Mingus. All tracks have subtitles. The fourth track (side two on the original vinyl release) comprises three movements with individual titles and subtitles. The track lengths listed on the album sleeve are incorrect; the times listed below are the actual track lengths.

No.	Title	Subtitle	Length
1.	"Track A – Solo Dancer"	"Stop! Look! And Listen, Sinner Jim Whitney!"	6:39
2.	"Track B – Duet Solo Dancers"	"Hearts' Beat and Shades in Physical Embraces"	6:45
3.	"Track C – Group Dancers"	"(Soul Fusion) Freewoman and Oh, This Freedom's Slave Cries"	7:22
4.	"Mode D – Trio and Group Dancers" "Mode E – Single Solos and Group Dance" "Mode F – Group and Solo Dance"	"Stop! Look! And Sing Songs of Revolutions!" "Saint and Sinner Join in Merriment on Battle Front" "Of Love, Pain, and Passioned Revolt, then Farewell, My Beloved, 'til It's Freedom Day"	18:39
Total length:			39:25

== Personnel ==
Musicians

- Charles Mingus – double bass, piano, composer
- Jerome Richardson – soprano and baritone saxophone, flute
- Charlie Mariano – alto saxophone
- Dick Hafer – tenor saxophone, flute
- Rolf Ericson – trumpet
- Richard Williams – trumpet
- Quentin Jackson – trombone
- Don Butterfield – tuba, contrabass trombone
- Jaki Byard – piano
- Jay Berliner – Classical guitar
- Dannie Richmond – drums
- Bob Hammer – arranger

Production

- Bob Thiele – production
- Bob Simpson – engineering
- Bob Ghiraldini – photography (cover and liner photos)
- Joe Lebow – artwork (liner design)
