= Clarence Shaw =

American jazz trumpeter (1926–1973)

- Also known as: Gene Shaw
- Born: Clarence Eugene Shaw; June 16, 1926; Detroit, Michigan, US
- Died: August 17, 1973 (aged 47) Los Angeles, California, US
- Genres: Jazz
- Instrument: Trumpet

Clarence Eugene Shaw, sometimes credited as Gene Shaw (June 16, 1926 – August 17, 1973), was an American jazz trumpeter and a student of Fourth Way psychology.

== Early life ==
Shaw was born in Detroit on June 16, 1926. He played the piano and trombone as a child. He began playing trumpet around 1946 after hearing Dizzy Gillespie's Hot House while recovering from injuries sustained in the army. He attended the Detroit Institute of Music, and studied with pianist Barry Harris.

== Later life and career ==
In Detroit, he played with Lester Young, Wardell Gray, and Lucky Thompson. He moved to New York in 1956 and began playing with Charles Mingus's Jazz Workshop in 1957. Among his credits with Mingus is Tijuana Moods. On East Coasting, Shaw used a Harmon mute, although he was initially wary of using it, given its association with the sound of Miles Davis. Later in 1957 he destroyed his instrument and quit music over a fight with Mingus. He did not return to playing until 1962, after which time he formed his own ensemble. He retired again in 1964 and returned to music once more in 1968. He died in Los Angeles on August 17, 1973. For many years, Gene was an active member of the Chicago Gurdjieff society and a student of Fourth Way psychology, including its music.

== Discography ==
=== As leader ===
- Breakthrough (Argo, 1962)
- Debut in Blues (Argo, 1963)
- Carnival Sketches (Argo, 1964)

=== As sideman ===
With Charles Mingus

- East Coasting (Bethlehem, 1957)
- A Modern Jazz Symposium of Music and Poetry (Bethlehem, 1957)
- Tijuana Moods (RCA, 1962)
