= Weary Blues (album) =

Studio album by Langston Hughes with Charles Mingus and Leonard Feather
- Released: 1958
- Recorded: March 17–18, 1958; New York City
- Genre: Jazz poetry
- Label: MGM E 3697
- Producer: Leonard Feather

Charles Mingus chronology
East Coasting (1957)	Weary Blues (1958)	A Modern Jazz Symposium of Music and Poetry (1959)

CD Reissue

Weary Blues (also referred to as The Weary Blues) is an album by the American poet Langston Hughes, who recites several of his poems over jazz accompaniment composed and arranged by Leonard Feather and Charles Mingus. The album was recorded on March 17 & 18, 1958 in New York and was released on the MGM label in 1959. It was later reissued on Verve Records.

On side 1 (track 1) of the album Hughes is backed by an ensemble organized and arranged by Leonard Feather, featuring Henry "Red" Allen, Sam "The Man" Taylor, Vic Dickenson, Milt Hinton, and Osie Johnson. On side 2 (tracks 2 and 3) the accompaniment is by Charles Mingus's group, featuring Horace Parlan, Shafi Hadi, Kenny Davis and Jimmy Knepper.

== Reception ==
Professional ratings
Review scores
Source	Rating
AllMusic	3/5 stars

The AllMusic review by Michael Katz called it "interesting, but not essential".

== Track listing ==
1. "Blues Montage: Opening Blues/Blues Montage/Commercial Theater/Morning After/Could Be/Testament"
2. "Consider Me: The Stranger/Midnight Stroll/Backstage
3. "Dream Montage: Weird Nightmare/Double G Train/Jump Monk

== Personnel ==
- Langston Hughes - narrator (all songs)

Track 1:

- Leonard Feather - arranger
- Red Allen - trumpet
- Vic Dickenson - trombone
- Sam "The Man" Taylor - tenor saxophone, clarinet
- Al Williams - piano
- Milt Hinton - bass
- Osie Johnson - drums

Tracks 2 and 3:

- Charles Mingus - bass, arranger
- Jimmy Knepper - trombone
- Shafi Hadi - tenor saxophone
- Horace Parlan - piano
- Kenny Dennis - drums
