= Mingus Moves =

Studio album by Charles Mingus
- Released: 1974
- Recorded: October 29–31, 1973
- Genre: Jazz
- Length: 62:34
- Label: Atlantic
- Producer: Nesuhi Ertegun

Charles Mingus chronology
Charles Mingus and Friends in Concert (1972)	Mingus Moves (1974)	Mingus at Carnegie Hall (1974)

Professional ratings
Review scores
Source	Rating
AllMusic	4/5 stars
The Rolling Stone Jazz Record Guide	3/5 stars

Mingus Moves is an album by the jazz composer and bassist Charles Mingus, recorded in 1973 and released in 1974.

== The music ==
Mingus Moves (Atlantic SD 1653) is one of the late works of American jazz bassist, composer, and bandleader Charles Mingus. He hired three new musicians for the recording: Don Pullen on piano; Ronald Hampton on trumpet, and George Adams on tenor saxophone. Drummer Dannie Richmond, a stalwart of Mingus's bands in the 1950s and '60s, rejoined the band on the first day of recording after not working with the bassist for several years.

The album, although not generally regarded as one of Mingus's best, does feature three remarkable compositions: "Canon", "Opus 3", and "Opus 4". "Canon" is a theme, as the title suggests, that can be superimposed upon itself. The song has a spiritual character, à la Coltrane, and is played with a warm sound by Pullen and Adams. This tune was also released on Hal Willner's tribute CD: Weird Nightmare - Meditations on Mingus. "Opus 3" is based on the Mingus's 1957 composition "Pithecanthropus Erectus", in which certain sections are played without key or meter restrictions. "Opus 4" is a straight-ahead swinger that features Don Pullen playing a free solo part.

The other tunes include "Moves", a composition written and sung (along with Honi Gordon) by Doug Hammond, Richmond's predecessor; "Wee", composed and arranged by Sy Johnson, who also worked with Mingus on Let My Children Hear Music (1971) and Charles Mingus and Friends in Concert (1972); "Flowers", written by Adams; and "Newcomer" by Pullen, dedicated to his newborn daughter.

The CD released in 1993 contains the bonus tracks "Big Alice" and "The Call", which were recorded during the same sessions.

The quadrophonic mix was released on Blu-ray in 2023 without the bonus tracks, but including a high resolution stereo mix.

== Track listing ==
(All compositions by Mingus except where noted.)

1. "Canon" – 5:28
2. "Opus 4" – 6:39
3. "Moves" (Doug Hammond) – 3:43
4. "Wee" (Sy Johnson) – 8:57
5. "Flowers for a Lady" (George Adams)– 6:44
6. "Newcomer" (Don Pullen) – 7:13
7. "Opus 3" – 10:26
8. "Big Alice" (Don Pullen) – 5:44 (bonus track)
9. "The Call" – 7:13 (later credited Ronald Hampton as writer)

== Personnel ==
- Ronald Hampton – Trumpet
- Doug Hammond – Vocals
- Honi Gordon – Vocals
- George Adams – Tenor sax, flute
- Dannie Richmond – Drums
- Don Pullen – Piano
- Charles Mingus – Bass
