= Epitaph (Charles Mingus composition) =

Jazz composition by Charles Mingus

Epitaph is a composition by jazz musician Charles Mingus. It is 4,235 measures long, takes more than two hours to perform, and was only completely discovered during the cataloguing process after his death. With the help of a grant from the Ford Foundation, the score and instrumental parts were copied, and the work itself was premiered by a 30-piece orchestra, conducted by Gunther Schuller and produced by Mingus's widow, Sue, at Alice Tully Hall on June 3, 1989, 10 years after his death, and issued as a live album. It was performed again at several concerts in 2007.

Accurately convinced that it would never be performed in his lifetime, Mingus called his work Epitaph declaring that it was written "for my tombstone."

== 1962 version ==
There was one ill-fated attempt to record some of "Epitaph" during Mingus's lifetime, in New York City on October 12, 1962. The album The Complete Town Hall Concert (United Artists UAJ 14024) includes the tracks "Epitaph Pt. I" and "Epitaph Pt. II", as well as "Clark in the Dark", for trumpeter Clark Terry, who played in the band.

The musicians included:

Saxes and woodwinds

- Danny Bank (contrabass clarinet)
- Romeo Penque (oboe)
- Buddy Collette (alto saxophone)
- Eric Dolphy (alto saxophone)
- Charlie Mariano (alto saxophone)
- Charles McPherson (alto saxophone)
- George Berg (tenor saxophone)
- Zoot Sims (tenor saxophone)
- Jerome Richardson (baritone saxophone)
- Pepper Adams (baritone saxophone)

Trumpets

- Eddie Armour
- Rolf Ericson
- Lonnie Hillyer
- Ernie Royal
- Clark Terry
- Richard Williams
- Snooky Young

Trombones and tuba

- Eddie Bert
- Jimmy Cleveland
- Willie Dennis
- Quentin Jackson
- Britt Woodman
- Paul Faulise

Rhythm section

- Warren Smith (vibraphone, percussion)
- Les Spann (guitar)
- Toshiko Akiyoshi (piano)
- Jaki Byard (piano)
- Charles Mingus (bass)
- Milt Hinton (bass)
- Dannie Richmond (drums)
- Grady Tate (percussion)

A review by Bill Coss appeared in the December 6, 1962, edition of Down Beat titled "A Report of a Most Remarkable Event", and was reprinted in the January 2005 edition.

The concert/recording was extremely disorganized. From the liner notes: "...this record represents a curious combination of open recording session and concert on a New York City Town Hall stage that held thirty musicians, two men still copying the music to be played, no play-back equipment, and a host of unbelievable tensions."

From Martin Williams's review: "The occasion was supposed to have been a public recording date, but the producers' announcements and ads somehow came out reading 'concert.' At one point during the proceedings, Mingus shouted to his audience, advising, 'Get your money back!'"

From the Coss article:

The microphone Mingus grabbed had no amplification, but what he said, more or less, was: "Get your money back. I couldn't stop you from coming here. The press agents lied to you. You've been taken advantage of. Go out now and get your money back. I don't want you to think I've done this to you. It was supposed to be a recording session, but Mr. George Wein, who is a fine promoter, changed it into a concert. So get your money back. The company has lots of money. It would take years to rehearse this music."

The problems seem to have arisen because Mingus had piles of new music in his head, and wanted to stage an open rehearsal which United Artists and producer Alan Douglas wanted to record and release. Then UA moved up the date five weeks, Mingus kept writing even newer music while rehearsals were underway, the musicians were unprepared (the Coss article suggests that in three previous rehearsals not one piece had been played all the way through), and audience members had apparently been expecting a fully rehearsed concert rather than a taping session with false starts and retakes.

== 1989 version ==
Epitaph

Live album by Charles Mingus
- Released: 1990
- Recorded: 1989
- Genre: Jazz
- Length: 127:22
- Label: Columbia
- Producers: Sue Mingus, Gunther Schuller, John McClure

Professional ratings
Review scores
Source	Rating
AllMusic	3.5/5 stars
Select	4/5

After Mingus's death, the score to Epitaph was rediscovered by Andrew Homzy, director of the jazz program at Concordia University, Montreal. He had been invited by Sue Mingus to catalogue a trunkful of Mingus's handwritten charts and in the process had discovered a vast assortment of orchestral pages written by Mingus with measures numbered consecutively well into the thousands. After some investigation, Homzy realized what it was that he had found and eventually managed to reassemble the Epitaph score. At that point Homzy and Sue Mingus got in touch with Gunther Schuller, who put together an all-star orchestra to play this very demanding piece of music. However, despite the stellar cast that was assembled, problems were again encountered. Thirty years earlier, charts were being copied in the wings before the show. This time, the charts were all computerized, but the software was buggy and again charts were being sight-read at the last minute.

This was no mean feat. Epitaph resembles many other Mingus compositions in level of difficulty. Trumpeter Wynton Marsalis, pointing at a passage in the score said, "That looks like something you would find in an Etude Book... under 'Hard'." And conductor Gunther Schuller stated "The only comparison I've ever been able to find is the great iconoclastic American composer Charles Ives." Despite all these challenges, however, the concert, at Alice Tully Hall in New York's Lincoln Center in 1989, was a critical triumph, if ten years too late for Charles Mingus to enjoy it. The same personnel performed the piece two days later at the Wolf Trap Farm Park outside of Washington, DC. A double-CD was later released by Columbia/Sony Records. The concert was also filmed, and broadcast on U.K. television around 1990. The 1989 recording at Alice Tully Hall was recorded by John McClure and David Hewitt on Remote Recording Services' Silver Truck.

=== Track listings ===
Disc 1
1. Main Score, Pt. 1
2. Percussion Discussion
3. Main Score, Pt. 2
4. Started Melody
5. Better Get It in Your Soul
6. The Soul
7. Moods in Mambo
8. Self Portrait / Chill of Death
9. O.P. (Oscar Pettiford)
10. Please Don't Come Back from the Moon
Disc 2
1. Monk, Bunk & Vice Versa (Osmotin')
2. Peggy's Blue Skylight
3. Wolverine Blues
4. The Children's Hour of Dream
5. Ballad (In Other Words, I Am Three)
6. Freedom
7. Interlude (The Underdog Rising)
8. Noon Night
9. Main Score, Reprise

=== Personnel ===
Conductor

- Gunther Schuller

Saxes and woodwinds

- John Handy (clarinet, alto saxophone)
- Jerome Richardson (clarinet, alto saxophone, speech)
- Bobby Watson (clarinet, flute, soprano saxophone, alto saxophone)
- George Adams (tenor saxophone)
- Phil Bodner (oboe, English horn, clarinet, tenor saxophone)
- Roger Rosenberg (piccolo, flute, clarinet, baritone saxophone)
- Gary Smulyan (clarinet, baritone saxophone)
- Michael Rabinowitz (bassoon, bass clarinet)
- Dale Kleps (flute, contrabass clarinet)

Trumpets

- Randy Brecker
- Wynton Marsalis
- Lew Soloff
- Jack Walrath
- Joe Wilder
- Snooky Young

Trombones and tuba

- Eddie Bert
- Sam Burtis
- Urbie Green
- David Taylor
- Britt Woodman (bass trombone)
- Paul Faulise (bass trombone)
- Don Butterfield (tuba)

Rhythm section

- Karl Berger (vibraphone, cowbell)
- John Abercrombie (guitar)
- Roland Hanna (piano)
- John Hicks (piano)
- Reggie Johnson (bass)
- Ed Schuller (bass, guiro)
- Victor Lewis (drums)
- Daniel Druckman (percussion, tumba)

== 2007 version ==
Let My Children Hear Music again presented Epitaph in 2007, including new sections discovered since the 1989 premiere.

- Wed, April 25, 2007, Frederick P. Rose Hall, Home of Jazz at Lincoln Center, New York. Hosted by Bill Cosby
- Fri, April 27, 2007, 8pm, Tri-C Jazz Festival, Cleveland, Ohio
- Wed, May 16, 2007, 8pm, Walt Disney Concert Hall, Los Angeles
- Fri, May 18, 2007, 8pm, Symphony Center Chicago, Symphony Orchestra Chicago

The concert at Walt Disney Concert Hall was broadcast by NPR and available online.

=== Personnel ===
Conductor

- Gunther Schuller

Saxes and woodwinds

- Michael Rabinowitz, bassoon
- Douglas Yates, contrabass clarinet
- Craig Handy
- Steve Slagle
- Abraham Burton, alto saxophones
- Kathy Halvorson
- Wayne Escoffery, tenor saxophones
- Ronnie Cuber
- Lauren Sevian, baritone saxophones

Trumpets

- Ryan Kisor
- Walter White
- Jack Walrath
- Dave Ballou
- Alex Sipiagin
- Kenny Rampton

Trombones and tuba

- Sam Burtis
- Ku-umba Frank Lacy
- Andre Hayward
- Conrad Herwig
- Earl McIntyre
- Dave Taylor
- Howard Johnson, tuba

Rhythm section

- Kenny Drew Jr.
- George Colligan, pianos
- Boris Kozlov
- Christian McBride, basses
- Johnathan Blake, drums
- Christos Rafalides, vibraphone
- Jack Wilkins, guitar
- Mark Belair
- David Nyberg, percussion

== Score ==
In 2008, the full score of Epitaph was published by Let My Children Hear Music, Inc (The Charles Mingus Institute), distributed by Hal Leonard.
