= Bob Hammer =

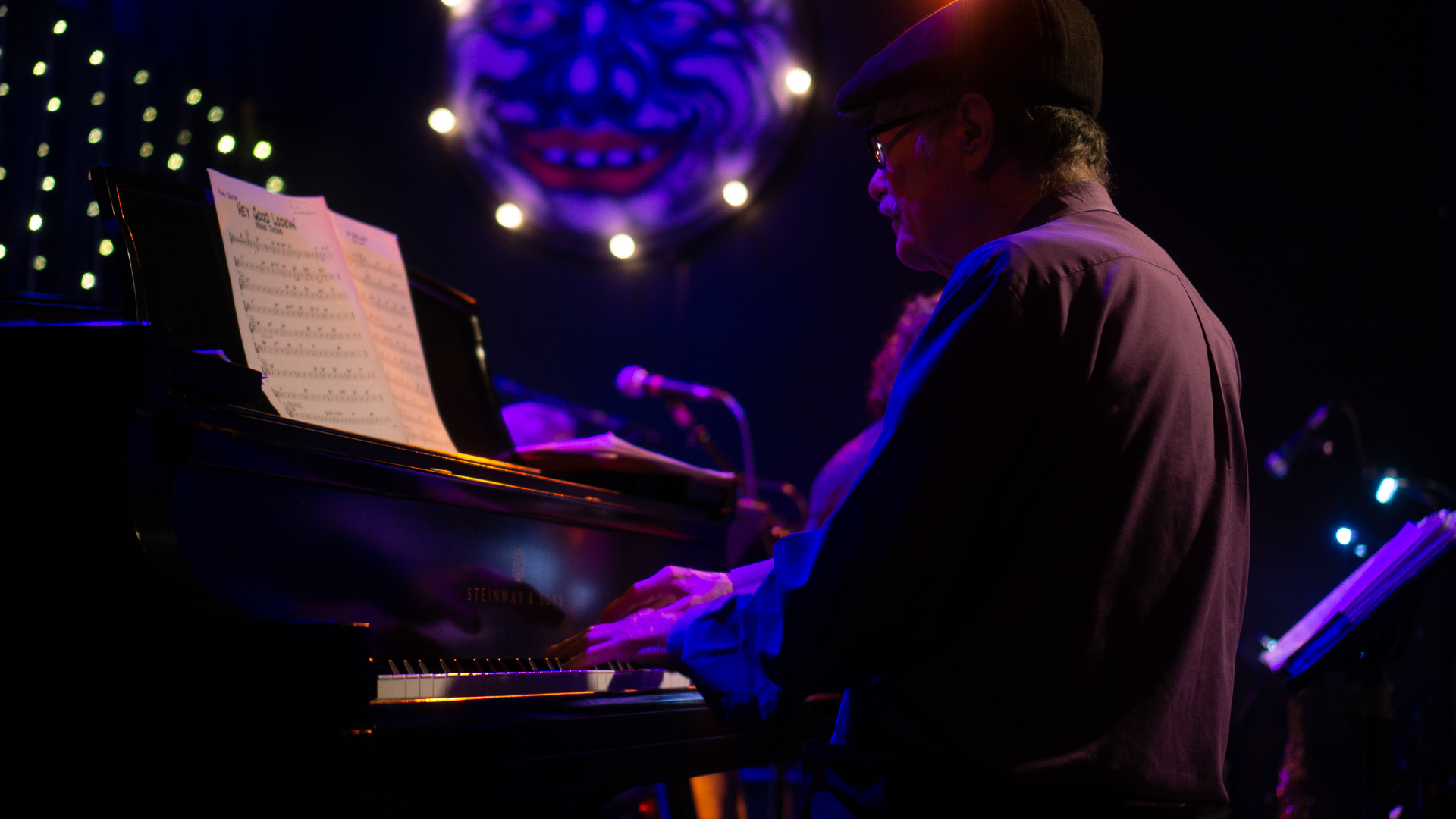
- Bob Hammer performing at The Royal Room on May 9, 2018

Background information
- Born: Howard Robert Hammer; March 3, 1930; Indianapolis, Indiana, U.S.
- Died: December 26, 2021 (aged 91) Chehalis, Washington, U.S.
- Genre: Jazz
- Occupations: Musician, composer, arranger
- Instrument: Piano
- Years active: 1940s–2021
- Formerly of: Charles Mingus, Woody Herman

Howard Robert Hammer (March 3, 1930 – December 26, 2021) was an American jazz pianist, composer and arranger.

== Biography ==
Howard Robert Hammer was born in Indianapolis, Indiana on March 3, 1930. He began performing in Michigan at age 15 before studying at Michigan State University and the Manhattan School of Music. Hammer had familiarized himself with early jazz styles (his father had performed with territory bands during the 1930s), and while living in New York, he performed with musicians such as Red Allen and Bud Freeman. During the early 1960s, he studied with composer Henry Brant (alongside Tom McIntosh and Julian Priester).

Hammer led a band with Bob Wilber (1955). He worked in the Sauter/Finnegan Orchestra, the Roy Eldridge Quartet (1956) and with Gene Krupa (1956/57). He was a member of Red Allen's band (1958–1962) and Eddie Condon's (1959/60) band. At that time, he recorded with Charles Mingus (who called him his "Beethoven") and began to work as arranger for the bassist on Mingus Mingus Mingus Mingus Mingus, Town Hall Concert and the celebrated The Black Saint and the Sinner Lady. In 1963, Hammer played with Pee Wee Russell, Krupa, and Eldridge. In 1964, he was on tour with Bobby Hackett. From 1965 to 1967, he worked as arranger for The Merv Griffin Show. He recorded with Jimmy Knepper, Johnny Hartman, Woody Herman, Clark Terry, and Elvin Jones. Between 1967 and 1982, he worked as a member of show bands in Las Vegas.

After moving to Los Angeles in 1983, Hammer had an engagement with Slide Hampton, worked as instructor for jazz improvisation at El Camino Community College, and played in the Jimmy Cleveland Octet. He also worked with Barbara McNair, the Tommy Newsom Quartet, and the MDA Labor Day Telethon. In 2004, he recorded with Floyd Standifer's quintet. He also arranged dance charts for the Nicholas Brothers, Skip Cunningham, Chester Whitmore, Jacqueline Douget, Deborah Lysholm, and Tim J Hickey.

Hammer died on December 26, 2021, at the age of 91.

== Discography ==
=== As leader ===
- Beatlejazz (ABC-Paramount, 1964)

=== As sideman ===
- Cozy Cole, A Cozy Conception of Carmen (Charlie Parker, 1962)
- Johnny Hartman, The Voice That Is! (Impulse!, 1964)
- Jimmy Knepper, A Swinging Introduction to Jimmy Knepper (Bethlehem, 1957)
- Charles Mingus, A Modern Jazz Symposium of Music and Poetry (Bethlehem, 1957)
