= Dick Hafer =

American jazz musician

Dick Hafer (May 29, 1927 – December 15, 2012) was an American jazz tenor saxophonist who performed with Benny Goodman, Lionel Hampton, Woody Herman, and other renowned big bands.

== Formative years ==
Born in Wyomissing, Pennsylvania on May 29, 1927, Hafer began playing clarinet at the age of seven and switched to tenor saxophone in high school. His first professional gig was with Charlie Barnet's orchestra in 1949. He played with Claude Thornhill from 1949 to 1950 before returning briefly to play with Barnet again. After this he played with Woody Herman (1951–55), Tex Beneke (1955), Bobby Hackett (1957–58), Elliot Lawrence (1958–60), and Benny Goodman (1962). In 1963 he recorded on two Charles Mingus albums.

In 1974 he moved to Los Angeles, California, where he worked mostly as a studio musician, including as a member of the studio band for The Merv Griffin Show on television. He released two albums under his own name in the 1990s.

== Death ==
Dick Hafer died in La Costa, California.

== Discography ==
=== As leader ===
- In a Sentimental Mood (Progressive, 1991)
- Prez Impressions (Fresh Sound, 1994)

=== As sideman ===
With Johnny Hartman

- The Voice That Is! (Impulse!, 1964)

With Herbie Mann

- Salute to the Flute (Epic, 1957)

With Charles Mingus

- Mingus Mingus Mingus Mingus Mingus (Impulse!, 1963)
- The Black Saint and the Sinner Lady (Impulse!, 1963)
