= Charles Mingus and Friends in Concert =

Live album by Charles Mingus
- Released: 1973
- Recorded: February 4, 1972
- Venue: Philharmonic Hall in the Lincoln Center for the Performing Arts in New York City
- Genre: Jazz
- Length: 130:36
- Label: Columbia
- Producer: Teo Macero

Charles Mingus chronology
Let My Children Hear Music (1971)	Charles Mingus and Friends in Concert (1973)	Mingus Moves (1973)

Charles Mingus and Friends in Concert is a live album by the jazz bassist and composer Charles Mingus, recorded at the Philharmonic Hall of the Lincoln Center for the Performing Arts in 1972 and released on the Columbia label. The CD release added five previously unreleased performances from the concert, but did not include the opening track, Fats Waller's "Honeysuckle Rose", present in the LP version and on former Japanese CD editions.

== Critical reception ==
The AllMusic review by Scott Yanow stated that "most of the music is overly loose but the overcrowded 'E's Flat, Ah's Flat Too' and particularly the 'Little Royal Suite' are memorable."

Professional ratings
Review scores
Source	Rating
AllMusic	3/5 stars
The Rolling Stone Jazz Record Guide	5/5 stars

== Track listing ==
All compositions by Charles Mingus, except as indicated

1. Introduction – 1:06 Bonus track on CD
2. "Jump Monk" – Mingus 7:27
3. "E.S.P." – 9:24
4. "Ecclusiastics" – 9:31
5. "Eclipse" – 4:02
6. "Us Is Two" – 10:12
7. "Taurus in the Arena of Life" – 4:53 Bonus track on CD
8. "Mingus Blues" – 5:32
9. Introduction to Little Royal Suite – 0:13
10. "Little Royal Suite" – 20:20
11. Introduction to Strollin' – 0:50 Bonus track on CD
12. "Strollin'" (Honi Gordon, Mingus) – 10:13 Bonus track on CD
13. "The I of Hurricane Sue" – 11:11 Bonus track on CD
14. "E's Flat, Ah's Flat Too" – 17:07
15. "Ool-Ya-Koo" (Curtis Fuller, Dizzy Gillespie) – 3:53
16. "Portrait" – 3:58 Bonus track on CD
17. "Don't Be Afraid, the Clown's Afraid Too" – 10:36 Bonus track on CD

== Personnel ==
- Charles Mingus – bass, arranger
- James Moody – flute
- Jon Faddis, Lonnie Hillyer, Lloyd Michaels, Eddie Preston – trumpet
- Richard Berg, Sharon Moe – French horn
- Eddie Bert – bass trombone
- Robert Stewart – tuba
- Howard Johnson – tuba, bass saxophone
- Lee Konitz, Charles McPherson, Rich Perry – alto saxophone
- Gene Ammons, George Dorsey – tenor saxophone
- Bobby Jones – tenor saxophone, clarinet
- Gerry Mulligan – baritone saxophone
- John Foster, Randy Weston – piano
- Milt Hinton – bass
- Joe Chambers – drums
- Dizzy Gillespie, Honi Gordon – vocals
- Bill Cosby – Master of Ceremonies
- Sy Johnson – arranger
- Teo Macero – arranger conductor
