= Charles Mingus: Triumph of the Underdog =

- DVD cover
- Directed by: Don McGlynn
- Written by: Don McGlynn
- Produced by: Don McGlynn; Sue Mingus
- Starring: Charles Mingus; Gunther Schuller; Wynton Marsalis
- Cinematography: Michael Spiller
- Edited by: Don McGlynn; Christian Moltke-Leth
- Music by: Charles Mingus
- Production company: Jazz Workshop
- Distributed by: Shanachie
- Release date: 1997
- Running time: 78 minutes
- Country: United States
- Language: English

Charles Mingus: Triumph of the Underdog is a 1997 documentary film about the life of jazz musician Charles Mingus.

== Synopsis ==
Charles Mingus narrates pieces of his own story. Born from a half-black/half-Swedish father and a half-black/half-Chinese mother (later having a half-black/half-Indian step-mother), Mingus tried to be all types of races but found he was a misfit that didn't belong anywhere; so he says he's just a negro. He sums this up stating: "In a society which sends messages that are racists capitalists, and have Judaeo-Christian ethic roots, the transmission of these messages to Black people can lead to socializing of their young with non-complementary values." He plays the cello.

Although he was a celebrated jazz musician, he was not always able to make a living. Gunther Schuller, a composer/conductor/historian, states that Charles Mingus is high up with American composers. Mingus's work is compared by Schuller to Duke Ellington and he notes that Mingus studied composers like Stravinsky. Mingus is more known as a bass leader than as a composer. Mingus as a composer, is not highly recognized for how great he was. Mingus states that in relation to race, "one day he will pledge allegiance to see that some day (America) will look to its own promises, to the victims that they call citizens".

John Handy and Sue Mingus describe Mingus as individual, volatile, strong, supremely honest, uncompromising, and having a very dynamic personality that ran like the color spectrum; testing people to see how far he could go. Wynton Marsalis describes him as never victimized by a style and that he was always relating his music to something human.

Jerome Richardson says Mingus was aware of what was going in regards to race and never backed down from it. John Handy says he did what most others could not, mainly because he was conscious of the race issue. his music portrayed dramatized events, past and present maybe even futuristic. He also notes that Mingus was writing compositions when everyone else was writing tunes. Gunther Schuller adds that all of his variety of his personality comes out in Mingus's music, and not only that it is the widest range of music composed by one single human being. It covers the entire range of human emotions, conditions. so he reflected who he was through his music. In addition, Schuller states that anything that was music, Mingus absorbed, and he absorbed it fast. In a television broadcast from the early 1970s, Mingus is asked by Chris Albertson how he feels about the term music, or jazz, Mingus replied, 'music' is a label; a given name for that which to call 'music.'

Randy Brecker notes Mingus had a willingness to express his vulnerability.Snooky Young recalls that during Mingus' lifetime, there were many clubs on Central Avenue, Los Angeles a place where he spent time, that would hold organized jazz sessions.

Mingus formed a strong professional relationship with drummer Dannie Richmond. Richmond's first drum lesson was from Mingus, and when he and Mingus finally talked, Mingus said that playing an instrument is like having a conversation. Mingus felt he was being cheated with the major record company.

A tribute to Ellington brought Mingus back into performances again after several difficult years. George Adams is associated with the bassist in his latter years.

Mingus died after developing Amyotrophic lateral sclerosis(ALS), also known as Lou Gehrig's Disease.

== Song clips ==
- "Started Melody" rehearsed by The Mingus Big Band at the Time Cafe (1997); intercut with the Town Hall performance of the same song (October 1962).
- "Epitaph" (which includes "Started Melody") at the Lincoln Center/Alice Tully Hall (June 1989).
- "This Subdues My Passion" by Boron Mingus and his Octet (May 1946).
- "Caravan" by Duke Ellington and His Orchestra (composer Juan Tizol)
- "Slide Hamp Slide" by Lionel Hampton and His Orchestra.
- The Massey Hall Concert with Charlie Parker, Dizzy Gillepie, Bud Powell, and Max Roach in Toronto in (May 1953).
- "Pithecanthropus Erectus" performed October 1970 (January 1956).
- "Better Get it in Your Soul" (May 1959).
- "Weird Nightmare"
- "The Clown" introduced by Duke Ellington at UCB (September 1969).
- "Sue's Changes" (July 1975).
- "Celia" (August 1957).
- "Goodbye Porkpie Hat" (1959).
- "Something Like a Bird" rehearsal (January 1978).
- "Chair in the Sky" written by Joni Mitchel (1978).
- "Sue Changes" by The Mingus Dynasty Band.
- "The Children's Hour of the Dream"

== Cast ==
- Brian Priestley
- Britt Woodman
- Celia Mingus
- Dannie Richmond
- Don Butterfield
- Dorian Mingus
- Eddie Bert
- Gunther Schuller
- Jerome Richardson
- Jimmy Knepper
- John Handy
- Lew Soloff
- Randy Brecker
- Snooky Young
- Sue Mingus
- Wynton Marsalis
