= Al Williams (pianist) =

American jazz and blues pianist

- Birth name: Alfred Williams
- Born: December 17, 1919 Memphis, Tennessee, U.S.
- Origin: Chicago, Illinois
- Died: November 15, 1998 (aged 78) New York City, U.S.
- Genres: Blues, jazz
- Occupation(s): Musician, arranger
- Instrument: Piano
- Years active: 1930s–1970s

Alfred Williams (December 17, 1919 – November 15, 1998) was an American jazz and blues pianist.

Born in Memphis, Tennessee, he moved as a young child with his family to Chicago. He studied classical piano, and worked as a professional pianist from the age of 16, initially as leader of a 12-piece dance orchestra in local venues. In 1942, he formed a trio, the Three Dudes, and also played with trumpeter Henry "Red" Allen, clarinetist Jimmie Noone, and violinist Erskine Tate. He wrote arrangements for many Chicago bands. After marrying singer Audrey Hobbs, the couple performed together in the late 1940s as Alfred and Audrey.

From the early 1950s he performed in New York City at venues including the Savoy Ballroom and the Metropole Cafe. He played in a Dixieland band, and also with Sam "The Man" Taylor, Jimmy Rushing, and others. He made recordings as a session musician, and appeared on Langston Hughes' 1958 album Weary Blues. He toured Europe with Buck Clayton in 1959 and Johnny Hodges in 1961. He also recorded as the leader of a trio, accompanied the 1968 satirical revue The Establishment, and in the 1970s worked as arranger and pianist with the Deep River Boys. His playing style was described as "essentially that of a blues pianist, but [with] some elements of swing".

Williams died in New York in 1998 at the age of 78.
