= The Voice That Is! =

Studio album by Johnny Hartman
- Released: 1964
- Recorded: September 22 & 24, 1964
- Studio: Van Gelder Studio, Englewood Cliffs, NJ
- Genre: Jazz
- Length: 34:07
- Label: Impulse!
- Producer: Bob Thiele

Johnny Hartman chronology
I Just Dropped By to Say Hello (1963)	The Voice That Is! (1964)	Unforgettable Songs by Johnny Hartman (1966)

The Voice That Is! is an album by American jazz vocalist Johnny Hartman featuring performances recorded in 1964 for the Impulse! label.

== Reception ==
The Allmusic review by Scott Yanow awarded the album 4 stars and stated "Hartman is in fine form whether backed by the Hank Jones quartet or accompanied by an octet arranged by pianist Bob Hammer, but this set is not as essential as his earlier meetings with John Coltrane and Illinois Jacquet".

Professional ratings
Review scores
Source	Rating
Allmusic	4/5 stars
The Rolling Stone Jazz Record Guide	4/5 stars

== Track listing ==
1. "My Ship" (Ira Gershwin, Kurt Weill) – 3:08
2. "The More I See You" (Mack Gordon, Harry Warren) – 2:26
3. "These Foolish Things" (Harry Link, Holt Marvell, Jack Strachey) – 4:17
4. "Waltz for Debby" (Bill Evans, Gene Lees) – 3:44
5. "It Never Entered My Mind" (Lorenz Hart, Richard Rodgers) – 3:35
6. "The Day the World Stopped Turning" (Buddy Kaye, Phillip Springer) – 2:29
7. "A Slow Hot Wind" (Norman Gimbel, Henry Mancini) – 3:23
8. "Funny World" (Alan Brandt, Ennio Morricone) – 4:08
9. "Joey, Joey, Joey" (Frank Loesser) – 4:24
10. "Let Me Love You" (Bart Howard) – 1:45
11. "Sunrise, Sunset" (Jerry Bock, Sheldon Harnick) – 2:48

== Personnel ==
- Johnny Hartman – vocals
- Dick Hafer – reeds (tracks 6–11)
- Phil Kraus – marimba (tracks 6–11)
- Howard Collins (tracks 6–11), Barry Galbraith – guitar
- Hank Jones – piano (tracks 1–5)
- Bob Hammer – piano, arranger (tracks 6–11)
- Richard Davis – bass
- Osie Johnson – drums
- Willie Rodriguez – percussion
