= Mingus Big Band =

American jazz ensemble

Mingus Big Band is a 14-piece ensemble, based in New York City, that specializes in the compositions of Charles Mingus. It was managed by his widow, Sue Mingus, along with Mingus Orchestra and Mingus Dynasty. In addition to its weekly Wednesday night appearance at DROM NYC in New York City, Mingus Big Band tours frequently, giving performances and clinics in America, Europe, and other parts of the world.

The band has received seven Grammy Award nominations and won a Grammy in 2011 for Best Large Jazz Ensemble Album for Mingus Big Band Live at Jazz Standard.

== Discography ==
- Nostalgia in Times Square (Dreyfus, 1993)
- Gunslinging Birds (Dreyfus, 1995) – Grammy nomination
- Live in Time (Dreyfus, 1996) – Live. Grammy nomination.
- Que Viva Mingus! (Dreyfus, 1997)
- Blues & Politics (Dreyfus, 1999)
- Tonight at Noon: Three of Four Shades of Love (Dreyfus, 2002) – Grammy nomination
- I Am Three (Sunnyside, 2005) – Grammy nomination
- Live in Tokyo at the Blue Note (Sunnyside, 2006) – Live. Grammy nomination.
- Mingus Big Band Live at Jazz Standard (Jazz Workshop / Sue Mingus Music, 2010) – Grammy won
- Mingus Sings (Sunnyside, 2015)
- The Charles Mingus Centennial Sessions (Jazz Workshop, 2022) – Grammy nomination
- The Charles Mingus Centennial Sessions, Vol. 2 (Candid, 2024)

== Band roster ==
- Johnathan Blake
- Seamus Blake
- Randy Brecker
- Abraham Burton
- Tommy Campbell
- Adam Cruz
- Ronnie Cuber
- Sam Dillon
- Kenny Drew, Jr.
- Donald Edwards
- Wayne Escoffery
- Orrin Evans
- Anthony Fazio
- Alex Foster
- Earl Gardner
- Greg Gisbert
- Tatum Greenblatt
- Craig Handy
- Philip Harper
- Vincent Herring
- Conrad Herwig
- John Hicks
- Theo Hill
- Coleman Hughes
- Howard Johnson
- David Lee Jones
- David Kikoski
- Ryan Kisor
- Jimmy Knepper
- Boris Kozlov
- Frank Lacy
- Peter Madsen
- Jason Marshall
- Earl McIntyre
- Andy McKee
- Dr. Alexander Pope Norris
- Chris Potter
- Kenny Rampton
- Mike Richmond
- Scott Robinson
- Lauren Sevian
- Alex Sipiagin
- Steve Slagle
- John Stubblefield
- Helen Sung
- David Taylor
- Alex Terrier
- Jack Walrath
- Michael Wang
- Walter White
- Ron Wilkins
- Brandon Wright
