= A Modern Jazz Symposium of Music and Poetry =

Studio album by Charles Mingus
- Released: May or June 1959
- Recorded: October 1957
- Genre: Jazz
- Length: 57:29
- Label: Bethlehem
- Producer: Jeff Palo

Charles Mingus chronology
Weary Blues (1958)	A Modern Jazz Symposium of Music and Poetry (1959)	Jazz Portraits: Mingus in Wonderland (1959)

Professional ratings
Review scores
Source	Rating
AllMusic	3/5 stars
Los Angeles Times	3.5/4 stars
The Penguin Guide to Jazz	3/4 stars

A Modern Jazz Symposium of Music and Poetry is an album by the jazz bassist, composer, and band leader Charles Mingus, released by Bethlehem Records in mid-1959. In spite of the title, the album does not contain any poetry. "Scenes in the City", however, includes narration performed by Mel Stewart and written by Lonne Elder III with assistance from Langston Hughes. The composition "Duke's Choice" re-appears, in updated form, as "I X Love" on the 1963 album Mingus Mingus Mingus Mingus Mingus. "Nouroog", "Duke's Choice" and "Slippers" form the basis of the suite "Open Letter to Duke" on Mingus Ah Um.

The CD issues of the album include three bonus tracks: the Dizzy Gillespie standard "Woody 'n' You", Charlie Parker's "Billie's Bounce", which is listed as "Bounce" and miscredited to Mingus, and an alternate take of "Slippers".

== Reception ==
The AllMusic review by Scott Yanow called the album "an excellent set of challenging yet often accessible music". The Penguin Guide to Jazz deemed it "an opportunity for Mingus to experiment with texts and with pure sound". The Penguin editors furthermore cite Clarence Shaw's performance on "New York Sketchbook" as "the best trumpet heard on a Mingus album for some time before or since".

== Track listing ==
All titles by Charles Mingus, except where noted.

1. "Scenes in the City" (Music: Mingus; Narrative: Elder, Hughes) – 11:55
2. "Nouroog" – 4:52
3. "New York Sketchbook" – 8:55
4. "Duke's Choice" – 6:27
5. "Slippers" – 3:29

Bonus tracks

1. "Woody 'n' You" (Gillespie) – 8:44
  - Mistitled "Wouldn't You" on earlier releases
2. "Bounce" (Parker) – 9:22
3. "Slippers (Alternate Take)" – 3:50

== Personnel ==
- Charles Mingus – bass
- Jimmy Knepper – trombone
- Shafi Hadi – tenor and alto saxophone
- Bill Hardman – trumpet (on "Nouroog")
- Clarence Shaw – trumpet (except on "Nouroog")
- Dannie Richmond – drums
- Horace Parlan – piano (on "Nouroog", "Duke's Choice", "Slippers"; left hand during final solo on "New York Sketchbook")
- Bob Hammer – piano (on remaining tracks)
- Mel Stewart – voice (narration on "Scenes in the City")
