= Oh Yeah (Charles Mingus album) =

Studio album by Charles Mingus
- Released: April 1962
- Recorded: November 6, 1961
- Studio: Atlantic Studios, New York City
- Genre: Jazz
- Length: 44:08
- Label: Atlantic
- Producer: Nesuhi Ertegün

Charles Mingus chronology
Newport Rebels (1961)	Oh Yeah (1962)	Tijuana Moods (1962)

Professional ratings
Review scores
Source	Rating
AllMusic	5/5 stars
DownBeat	3.5/5 stars
The Penguin Guide to Jazz Recordings	3/4 stars

Oh Yeah is a studio album by the American jazz musician and composer Charles Mingus. It was released in April 1962 through Atlantic Records. It was recorded in 1961, and features Mingus playing piano rather than his usual upright bass, and also singing on three songs.

== Track listing ==
All compositions by Charles Mingus.

1. "Hog Callin' Blues" – 7:27
2. "Devil Woman" – 9:42
3. "Wham Bam Thank You Ma'am" – 4:43
4. "Ecclusiastics" – 6:59
5. "Oh Lord Don't Let Them Drop That Atomic Bomb on Me" – 5:43
6. "Eat That Chicken" – 4:38
7. "Passions of a Man" – 4:56

The 1999 Rhino CD reissue included three additional tracks recorded at the same session (and previously released on Tonight at Noon in 1964):

8. "'Old' Blues for Walt's Torin" – 7:58
9. "Peggy's Blue Skylight" – 9:49
10. "Invisible Lady" – 4:48

The 1988 Atlantic CD reissue included only one additional track, a 24-minute excerpt of an interview with Mingus conducted by Nesuhi Ertegün which was discovered in 1987. The full 77-minute interview appears as a bonus disc on the box set Passions of a Man: the Complete Atlantic Recordings (1956-1961).

== Personnel ==
- Charles Mingus – piano and vocals
- Rahsaan Roland Kirk – flute, siren, tenor saxophone, manzello, and stritch
- Booker Ervin – tenor saxophone
- Jimmy Knepper – trombone
- Doug Watkins – bass
- Dannie Richmond – drums

=== Technical personnel ===
- Nesuhi Ertegün – producer
- Tom Dowd – recording engineer
- Phil Iehle – recording engineer
