= Charles Mingus in Paris: The Complete America Session =

Compilation album by Charles Mingus
- Released: 1970 Original America LPs; 2006 CD reissue with bonus tracks
- Recorded: October 31, 1970
- Studios: Studio Decca, Paris, France
- Genre: Jazz
- Length: 87:23
- Labels: America AM 6109 & AM 6110; Sunnyside SSC 3065 - CD Reissue

Charles Mingus chronology
Music Written for Monterey 1965 (1965)	Charles Mingus in Paris: The Complete America Session (1970)	Charles Mingus Sextet In Berlin (1970)

Blue Bird Album Cover

Pithycanthropus Erectus Album Cover

Charles Mingus in Paris: The Complete America Session is a compilation of two albums by American bassist, composer and bandleader Charles Mingus which were recorded in Paris in 1970 and first released on the French America label as Blue Bird and Pithycanthropus Erectus. The compilation was released on the Sunnyside label in 2006 with all the released tracks combined on one CD and a second CD of additional tracks featuring false starts and incomplete takes from the session.

== Reception ==
Ken Dryden of Allmusic stated, "After a five-year layoff from doing any studio recording, Mingus was fully prepared for this 1970 session... The soloists shine throughout the date, with no one musician trying to outdo the others. This two-CD set adds all of the other material recorded during this single-day session on a separate disc, including all false starts, breakdowns, incomplete takes, and rehearsals, so serious fans can figure out how the performances evolved in the studio". Andrey Henkin from All About Jazz stated "The material is a strange assortment from various eras.. The longer tunes are more exciting but the shorter ones demonstrate Mingus' concern for strong composing, his or others"

Professional ratings
Review scores
Source	Rating
Allmusic	4/5 stars
The Penguin Guide to Jazz Recordings	3.5/4 stars

== Track listing ==
All compositions by Charles Mingus except where noted.

Disc one

1. "I Left My Heart in San Francisco" (George Cory, Douglass Cross) - 4:06 Originally released on Blue Bird
2. "Reincarnation of a Lovebird" - 15:11 Originally released on Blue Bird
3. "Peggy's Blue Skylight" - 12:52 Originally released on Pithycanthropus Erectus
4. "Love Is a Dangerous Necessity" - 4:36 Originally released on Pithycanthropus Erectus
5. "Blue Bird" - 18:10 Originally released on Blue Bird
6. "Pithecanthropus Erectus" - 16:41 Originally released on Pithycanthropus Erectus

Also released as Reincarnation of Lovebird 2 LP set by Prestige records in 1970

Disc two

1. "Reincarnation of a Lovebird" [Warm Up and First False Start] - 0:30
2. "Reincarnation of a Lovebird" [Second False Start] - 1:49
3. "Reincarnation of a Lovebird" [Third False Start] - 0:06
4. "Reincarnation of a Lovebird" [Incomplete Take] - 4:51
5. "Peggy's Blue Skylight" [First False Start] - 0:15
6. "Peggy's Blue Skylight" [Second False Start] - 0:15
7. "Peggy's Blue Skylight" [Third False Start and Rehearsal] - 0:37
8. "Peggy's Blue Skylight" [Alternate Take] - 9:47
9. "Blue Bird" [Incomplete Take] - 4:12
10. "Reprise" - 0:42
11. "Love Is a Dangerous Necessity" [First False Start] - 1:06
12. "Love Is a Dangerous Necessity" [Second False Start] - 1:49
13. "Pithecanthropus Erectus" [First Take, Incomplete] - 7:33
14. "Pithecanthropus Erectus" [Reprise] - 0:54
15. "Pithecanthropus Erectus" [Rehearsal] - 0:35
16. "Pithecanthropus Erectus" [False Start] - 0:09
17. "Pithecanthropus Erectus" [To the End] - 10:02
18. "Pithecanthropus Erectus" [Mingus Explanations, Restart] - 2:17

== Personnel ==
- Charles Mingus - bass
- Eddie Preston - trumpet
- Charles McPherson - alto saxophone
- Bobby Jones - tenor saxophone
- Jaki Byard - piano
- Dannie Richmond - drums
