= Mingus at Antibes =

Live album by Charles Mingus
- Released: 1976
- Recorded: 13 July 1960
- Venue: Antibes
- Genre: Jazz
- Length: 71:44
- Label: Atlantic
- Producer: Nesuhi Ertegün

Charles Mingus chronology
Charles Mingus Sextet In Berlin (1970)	Mingus at Antibes (1976)	Charles Mingus with Orchestra (1987)

Professional ratings
Review scores
Source	Rating
AllMusic	5/5 stars
The Penguin Guide to Jazz Recordings	4/4 stars
The Rolling Stone Jazz Record Guide	5/5 stars
DownBeat	5/5 stars

Mingus at Antibes was originally issued by BYG Records under the title Charles Mingus Live With Eric Dolphy in Japan in 1974. It was recorded at a live 1960 performance at the Jazz à Juan festival at Juan-les-Pins by jazz bassist and composer Charles Mingus; and was re-released by Atlantic Records in more complete form as a double album with the title Mingus In Antibes in the United States in 1979.

The album captures a performance at Jazz à Juan, and features some of Mingus's then-regular musicians in a generally pianoless quintet, though the band is joined by Bud Powell on "I'll Remember April", and Mingus himself plays some piano on "Wednesday Night Prayer Meeting" and "Better Git Hit in Your Soul".

== Reception ==
DownBeat assigned the album 5 stars. Reviewer Art Lange wrote, "This never before heard two record set of performances was recorded live at the Antibes Jazz Festival on July 13, 1960, just a scant three months before the classic Candid session Charles Mingus Presents Charles Mingus, which utilized the same personnel (minus Ervin and Powell, of course) . . . The overall excellence of this set suggests that Atlantic is sitting on a great deal of unissued Mingus material—a mouth-watering prospect . . . this recording . . . is required listening for anyone interested in the evolution and evocation of jazz. Just don’t let your curiosity stop there. There’s a lot of Mingus still around, with hopefully more on the way, and it all deserves to be heard".

== Track listing ==
All compositions by Charles Mingus except where noted.

1. "Wednesday Night Prayer Meeting" – 11:54 (included on both BYG and Atlantic issues)
2. "Prayer For Passive Resistance" – 8:06 (included on Atlantic issues only)
3. "What Love?" – 13:34 (included on Atlantic issues only)
4. "I'll Remember April" (Gene de Paul) – 13:39 (included on Atlantic issues only)
5. "Folk Forms I" – 11:08 (included on both BYG and Atlantic issues)
6. "Better Git Hit In Your Soul" – 11:00 (included on both BYG and Atlantic issues)

== Personnel ==
- Charles Mingus – bass, piano (on tracks 1 and 6)
- Ted Curson – trumpet
- Eric Dolphy – alto saxophone, bass clarinet (on track 3)
- Booker Ervin – tenor saxophone (except on track 3)
- Dannie Richmond – drums
- Bud Powell – piano (on track 4)
