= Bobby Jones (saxophonist) =

American jazz musician

Bobby Jones (October 30, 1928 in Louisville, Kentucky – March 6, 1980 in Munich) was an American jazz saxophonist.

Jones played drums as a child and started on clarinet at age 8; his father encouraged him to explore jazz. He studied with Simeon Bellison, Joe Allard, Charlie Parker, and George Russell. He played with Ray McKinley from 1949 into the mid-1950s, and then with Hal McIntyre before rejoining McKinley later in the decade.

During a stint in the Army he met Nat and Cannonball Adderley as well as Junior Mance; after his discharge he played country music and rock & roll as a studio musician, and did time with Boots Randolph and Glenn Miller (1950) before returning again with McKinley from 1959 to 1963. He played briefly with Woody Herman and Jack Teagarden in 1963, and after Teagarden's death he retired to Louisville and started a local jazz council there in addition to teaching at Kentucky State College. In 1969 he moved to New York City and played with Charles Mingus from 1970 to 1972, touring Europe and Japan with him. He also recorded sessions under his own name in 1972 and 1974.

Late in his life he moved to Germany, where he ceased performing due to emphysema. He died there in 1980.

== Personal life ==
Jones is the father of voice actor Dylan Jones.

== Discography ==
=== As leader ===
- Arrival of Bobby Jones (Cobblestone, 1972)
- Hill Country Suite with George Mraz, Freddie Waits (Enja, 1974)

=== As sideman ===
With Charles Mingus

- Charles Mingus Sextet In Berlin (Beppo, 1970)
- Charles Mingus with Orchestra (Columbia, 1971)
- Pithycanthropus Erectus (America, 1971)
- Blue Bird (America, 1971)
- Let My Children Hear Music (Columbia, 1972)
- Charles Mingus and Friends in Concert (Columbia, 1973)
- Reincarnation of a Lovebird (Prestige, 1974)
- Charles Mingus in Paris: The Complete America Session (Sunnyside, 2006)

With others

- Bill Cosby, Bill Cosby Presents Badfoot Brown and the Bunions Bradford Funeral Marching Band (Sussex, 1972)
- New Glenn Miller Orchestra, Dance Anyone? (RCA Victor, 1960)
- New Glenn Miller Orchestra, The Authentic Sound of the New Glenn Miller Orchestra Today (RCA Victor, 1961)
- Woody Herman, Encore (Philips, 1963)
- Woody Herman, Woody's Big Band Goodies (Philips, 1965)
- Jimmy Raney, Strings & Swings (Muse, 1972)
- Willie Thomas & Bunky Green, In Love Again (Mark, 1987)
