= Mingus: Charlie Mingus 1968 =

- Directed by: Thomas Reichman
- Produced by: Thomas Reichman
- Starring: Charlie Mingus; Carolyn Mingus
- Cinematography: Lee Osborne; Michael Wadleigh
- Edited by: Richard Clarke; Marshall Potakin
- Production company: Inlet Films
- Distributed by: Film-makers' Cooperative; Films Inc.
- Release date: May 16, 1968
- Running time: 58 minutes
- Country: United States
- Language: English

Mingus: Charlie Mingus 1968 is a 1968 American documentary film directed by Thomas Reichman (1944-1975) that follows the later life of jazz musician Charles Mingus and his five-year-old daughter in 1966, as they are being evicted from his New York apartment for not paying the rent. Reichman talks with Mingus in a very personal setting as the film documents Mingus' outlook on society, women, music, his daughter, politics, and the country as a whole. The camera crew talks with Mingus conversationally and spends time with him and his daughter so that the film takes on an intimate air.

The film highlights their way of life and how political and racial tensions affected people of the 1960s personally. The reason for Reichman's investigation into Mingus’ eviction was to show the lifestyle of a prominent jazz musician and to show how American society was structured during the Civil Rights era. At a time when the Jim Crow laws had recently been rescinded (Civil Rights Act of 1964 and Voting Rights Act of 1965), there were African Americans who didn't feel they were treated equally; in many cases they weren't. Throughout this film Mingus makes it clear that he believes that society is run for and by “white America” and goes on to say that if it were not for his standing as a jazz musician he would not be treated anywhere close to equally.

In 2022, the film was selected for preservation in the United States National Film Registry by the Library of Congress as being "culturally, historically, or aesthetically significant".

== Content ==
The film looks into the life of Mingus as a musician, a father, and a U.S. citizen simultaneously. To begin, the audience is given a first-hand look at Mingus’ true passion: music. Throughout the documentary there are clips of Mingus performing with a small ensemble of other musicians (including drummer Dannie Richmond) jamming in the outskirts of Boston at Lennie's-On-The-Turnpike in Peabody, MA, a favorite club of jazz performers.

However, though Mingus’ musical talents are part of this film, they are not the main focus. Reichman instead documents how Mingus is being evicted from his New York city apartment. The movie begins with Mingus talking about his possible eviction.

Mingus shows off a rifle that he has in his apartment. He also fires a loaded shotgun within the apartment, damaging the ceiling moulding.

== See also ==
- List of American films of 1968
