= Hank (album) =

Studio album by the Hank Mobley Sextet
- Released: October 1957
- Recorded: April 21, 1957
- Studio: Van Gelder Studio; Hackensack, New Jersey
- Genre: Jazz
- Length: 37:41
- Label: Blue Note; BLP 1560
- Producer: Alfred Lion

The Hank Mobley Sextet chronology
| Hank Mobley Quintet (1957) | Hank (1957) | Hank Mobley (1957) |

Hank is an album by the Hank Mobley Sextet recorded on April 21, 1957 and released on Blue Note later that year. The sextet features horn section Donald Byrd and John Jenkins, and rhythm section Bobby Timmons, Wilbur Ware and “Philly Joe" Jones.

== Reception ==
Professional ratings
Review scores
| Source | Rating |
|---|---|
| AllMusic | 4/5 stars |

The AllMusic review awarded the album 4 stars.

== Track listing ==
All compositions by Hank Mobley except as indicated.

=== Side 1 ===
1. "Fit for a Hanker" – 7:24
2. "Hi Groove, Low Feedback" – 9:56

=== Side 2 ===
1. "You'd Be So Easy to Love" (Porter) – 5:39
2. "Time After Time" (Cahn, Styne) – 6:48
3. "Dance of the Infidels" (Powell) – 7:54

== Personnel ==
=== Hank Mobley Sextet ===
- Hank Mobley – tenor saxophone
- John Jenkins – alto saxophone
- Donald Byrd – trumpet
- Bobby Timmons – piano
- Wilbur Ware – bass
- Philly Joe Jones – drums

=== Technical personnel ===
- Alfred Lion – producer
- Rudy Van Gelder – recording engineer
- Tom Hannan – design
- Francis Wolff – photography
- Ira Gitler – liner notes

== Charts ==
Chart performance for Hank
| Chart (2026) | Peak position |
|---|---|
| UK Jazz & Blues Albums (OCC) | 23 |
