= Charles Mingus with Orchestra =

Studio album by Charles Mingus
- Released: 1987
- Recorded: January 14, 1971; Nippon Columbia Studios, Tokyo Japan
- Genre: Jazz
- Label: Columbia (Japan) NCB-7008; Denon DC-8565 - CD Reissue

Charles Mingus chronology
Mingus at Antibes (1974)	Charles Mingus with Orchestra (1987)	Let My Children Hear Music (1971)

Charles Mingus with Orchestra is an album by American bassist, composer and bandleader Charles Mingus which was recorded in Japan in 1971 and first released on the Japanese Columbia label.

== Reception ==
Professional ratings
Review scores
Source	Rating
Allmusic	3/5 stars

The Allmusic review by Ken Dryden stated, "This Charles Mingus session is a bit of an oddity, in that he is heard with a Japanese big band, Toshiyuki Miyama & His New Herd Orchestra, which augmented his small group... the Japanese brass and rhythm sections sound a bit rough in the ensemble passages. Far from an essential date in Charles Mingus' vast discography".

== Track listing ==
All compositions by Charles Mingus

1. "The Man Who Never Sleeps" - 16:19
2. "Portrait" - 8:13
3. "O.P." - 7:25

== Personnel ==
- Charles Mingus - bass
- Eddie Preston - trumpet
- Bobby Jones - tenor saxophone
- Masahiko Sato - piano
- Toshiyuki Miyama and His New Herd Orchestra
