= Eddie Preston =

American jazz trumpeter (1925–2009)

- Born: May 9, 1925; Dallas, Texas, U.S.
- Died: June 22, 2009 (aged 84) Palm Coast, Florida, U.S.
- Genre: Jazz
- Occupation: Musician
- Instrument: Trumpet
- Formerly of: Lionel Hampton; Ray Charles; Louis Jordan; Duke Ellington; Count Basie; Charles Mingus

Eddie Preston (May 9, 1925, in Dallas, Texas – June 22, 2009, in Palm Coast, Florida) was an American jazz trumpeter.

Preston began playing in big bands after World War II, doing stints with Lionel Hampton (1955–56), Ray Charles (1959), Louis Jordan (1960–61), Duke Ellington (1962), and Count Basie (1963). He played with Charles Mingus between 1963 and 1965 and again in 1969–72, with the time in between spent freelancing with musicians such as Sonny Stitt and Frank Foster. He played again with Ellington in 1971 and then did some work as a leader, as well as working with Rahsaan Roland Kirk in 1977 and Archie Shepp in 1979.

== Discography ==
=== As sideman ===
With Duke Ellington

- The London Concert (United Artists, 1972)
- Recollections of the Big Band Era (Atlantic, 1974)
- The Afro-Eurasian Eclipse (Fantasy, 1975)
- The Ellington Suites (Pablo, 1976)
- Up in Duke's Workshop (Pablo, 1979)
- Studio Sessions New York 1963 (LMR, 1987) – The Private Collection: Volume 4
- The Private Collection: Volume 10 Studio Sessions (Saja, 1989)
- Never-Before-Released Recordings, 1965–1972 (MusicMasters, 1991)

With Lionel Hampton

- A Song of the Vineyard / Shalom Shalom (Clef, 1955)
- Lionel Hampton Big Band (Clef, 1955)
- Midnight Sun / Airmail Special (Clef, 1955)

With Charles Mingus

- Mingus Mingus Mingus Mingus Mingus (Impulse!, 1964)
- Charles Mingus Sextet In Berlin (Beppo, 1970)
- Blue Bird (America, 1970)
- Pithycanthropus Erectus (America, 1970)
- Charles Mingus in Paris: The Complete America Session (Sunnyside, 1970)
- Charles Mingus and Friends in Concert (Columbia, 1973)
- Charles Mingus: Statements (Joker, 1977)
- Charles Mingus with Orchestra (Columbia, 1987)
- Reincarnation of a Lovebird (Prestige, 1988)

With others

- Count Basie, This Time by Basie! (Reprise, 1963)
- Sonny Criss–Slim Gaillard–Roy Porter Big Band, Black California (The Savoy Sessions) (Savoy, 1976)
- Bill Doggett, The Right Choice (After Hours, 1991)
- Rahsaan Roland Kirk, Boogie-Woogie String Along for Real (Warner Bros., 1977)
- Archie Shepp, Attica Blues Big Band Live at the Palais des Glaces (Blue Marge, 1979)
- Sonny Stitt, What's New!!! (Roulette, 1966)
- McCoy Tyner, Inner Voices (Milestone, 1977)
