= Hank Mobley (album) =

Studio album by Hank Mobley
- Released: Mid June 1958
- Recorded: June 23, 1957
- Studio: Van Gelder Studio; Hackensack, New Jersey
- Genre: Jazz
- Length: 34:28
- Label: Blue Note; BLP 1568
- Producer: Alfred Lion

Hank Mobley chronology
Hank (1957)	Hank Mobley (1958)	Curtain Call (1957)

Hank Mobley is an album by American jazz saxophonist Hank Mobley recorded on June 23, 1957 and released on Blue Note the following year. The sextet features horn section Bill Hardman and Curtis Porter and rhythm section Sonny Clark, Paul Chambers, and Art Taylor.

== Background ==
Mobley 1568 is considered to be one of the most difficult to find and collectable albums in its original pressing form in the Blue Note discography. It was not reissued in the typical fashion by United Artists in 1971, and sold poorly in its initial pressing. Collectors quality copies of the first pressing regularly command well over $3,000.

== Reception ==
AllMusic awarded the album 3 stars.

Professional ratings
Review scores
Source	Rating
AllMusic	3/5 stars

== Track listing ==
Side 1
No.	Title	Writer(s)	Length
1.	"Mighty Moe and Joe"	Curtis Porter	6:53
2.	"Falling in Love with Love"	Lorenz Hart; Richard Rodgers	5:26
3.	"Bags' Groove"	Milt Jackson	5:53

Side 2
No.	Title	Writer(s)	Length
1.	"Double Exposure"	Hank Mobley	8:04
2.	"News"	Porter	8:12

== Personnel ==
=== Musicians ===
- Hank Mobley – tenor saxophone
- Bill Hardman – trumpet
- Curtis Porter – alto and tenor saxophones
- Sonny Clark – piano
- Paul Chambers – bass
- Art Taylor – drums

=== Technical personnel ===
- Alfred Lion – producer
- Rudy Van Gelder – recording engineer
- Tom Hannan – design
- Francis Wolff – photography
- Robert Levin – liner notes

== Charts ==
Chart performance for Hank Mobley
Chart (2026)	Peak position
UK Jazz & Blues Albums (OCC)	24
