= Tonight at Noon =

Studio album by Charles Mingus
- Released: July 1964
- Recorded: March 12, 1957, and November 6, 1961
- Genre: Jazz
- Length: 38:08
- Label: Atlantic
- Producer: Joel Dorn

Charles Mingus chronology
Mingus Mingus Mingus Mingus Mingus (1964)	Tonight at Noon (1964)	Mingus Plays Piano (1964)

Tonight at Noon is an album of music by the jazz bassist and composer Charles Mingus. It was released through Atlantic Records in July 1964. It compiles tracks recorded at two sessions – the 1957 sessions for the album entitled The Clown and the 1961 sessions for Oh Yeah. These tracks have since been added to the CD re-releases of their respective albums as bonus tracks.

== Reception ==
The AllMusic review by Thom Jurek stated: "While the former session features Mingus going for the blues via European harmonics and melodic approaches with hard bop tempos (particularly on the title track), the latter session with its nocturnal elegance and spatial irregularities comes off more as some kind of exercise in vanguard Ellington with sophisticated harmonies that give way to languid marches and gospel-tinged blues... Despite the fact that this is an assembled album, it holds plenty of magic nonetheless".

Professional ratings
Review scores
Source	Rating
AllMusic	3/5 stars
Record Mirror	4/5 stars

== Track listing ==
All compositions by Charles Mingus

1. "Tonight at Noon" – 6:00
2. "Invisible Lady" – 4:51
3. ""Old" Blues for Walt's Torin" [aka "Roland Kirk's Message"] – 7:57
4. "Peggy's Blue Skylight" – 9:46
5. "Passions of a Woman Loved" – 9:47

- Recorded at Atlantic Studios in New York City on March 13, 1957 (tracks 1 & 5) and November 6, 1961

== Personnel ==
- Charles Mingus – bass, piano, vocals
- Jimmy Knepper – trombone
- Shafi Hadi (as Curtis Porter) (tracks 1 & 5) – alto saxophone
- Booker Ervin (tracks 2–4) – tenor saxophone
- Roland Kirk – tenor saxophone, manzello, stritch, siren, flute (tracks 2–4)
- Wade Legge – piano (tracks 1 & 5)
- Doug Watkins – bass (tracks 2–4)
- Dannie Richmond – drums
