= Sy Johnson =

American jazz arranger and pianist (1930–2022)

- Born: Sivert Bertil Johnson Jr. April 15, 1930; New Haven, Connecticut, U.S.
- Died: July 26, 2022 (aged 92) New York City, New York, U.S.
- Genres: Jazz
- Occupations: Musician, photographer, writer, and educator
- Instruments: Piano, voice, composer, arranger
- Formerly of: Charles Mingus Lee Konitz Quincy Jones Joe Williams Elvis Costello
- Spouse: Lois Mirviss (m. 1975)

Sivert Bertil Johnson Jr. (April 15, 1930 – July 26, 2022) was an American jazz composer, arranger, and pianist who worked with Charles Mingus in the 1960s and 1970s. He also worked with the Lee Konitz Nonet, among others. His work with Mingus is his best-known.

== Life and career ==
Johnson was born in New Haven, Connecticut, on April 15, 1930. He first performed with Charles Mingus in 1960 at the Showplace, a jazz club on West 4th St., in the band that included Booker Ervin on tenor, Ted Curson on trumpet, Dannie Richmond on drums, and Mingus on bass, and on his first night with Mingus, Eric Dolphy performed on alto, bass clarinet and flute. Johnson agreed to sit in with the band for two weeks, with the understanding that he would then be put on the payroll; at the end of the two weeks, he came into work and found himself replaced by Yusef Lateef, the multi-instrumentalist. "[Mingus] made as though he was going to walk right by me," Johnson later recalled, "and then he said to me, 'If it was up to you, and you had a choice between hiring Yusef Lateef and you, who would you hire?' And then he walked out, he figured there wasn't any answer for that. And he was quite right, as a matter of fact."

In 1971, eleven years later, Mingus climbed the stairs to Emile Charlap's copying office, home to many great arrangers, and before he left, he gave Johnson Let My Children Hear Music to arrange, which featured two Mingus pieces, "The Shoes of the Fisherman's Wife (Are Some Jiveass Slippers)" and "Don't Be Afraid, the Clown's Afraid Too". The album's emergence was heralded with a live concert, Mingus And Friends At Philharmonic Hall, also arranged by Johnson and released as an album. Johnson continued to work with Mingus until his death from Lou Gehrig's disease in 1979. Mingus recorded two of Johnson's compositions, "Wee" and "For Harry Carney", and nominated Johnson for a Guggenheim Award following his own in jazz composition. Johnson continued to work with Sue Mingus arranging charts for all the Mingus repertory ensembles—Mingus Big Band, Mingus Orchestra and Mingus Dynasty. His other collaborations in the music world have been with Joe Williams, Frank Sinatra, Wes Montgomery, Roy Eldridge, Ben Webster, Quincy Jones, Benny Goodman, Count Basie, Mel Tormé, Terry Gibbs, and Sarah Vaughan among others. He has also worked on Broadway and in films such as The Cotton Club (1984).

In 1975, Johnson married Lois Mirviss, an interior designer and creative director of Mirviss Design Associates, in New York City. They lived together on the Upper East Side of Manhattan until Johnson's death in 2022. They are remembered by their friends, family, and neighbors as having had "one of the great loves." Johnson was also known as a jazz photographer, writer, pianist, singer, and teacher.

He died from complications of COVID-19 in New York City on July 26, 2022, at the age of 92.

== Discography ==
=== As sideman ===
- Rod Levitt, The Dynamic Sound Patterns (Riverside, 1964)
- Rod Levitt, Insight (RCA Victor, 1965)
- Rod Levitt, Solid Ground (RCA Victor, 1966)
- Dick Sudhalter, Melodies Heard...Melodies Sweet (Challenge, 1999)

=== As arranger ===
With Craig Handy

- Reflections in Change (Sirocco Music, 1999)

With Charles Mingus

- Let My Children Hear Music (Columbia, 1972)
- Charles Mingus and Friends in Concert (Columbia, 1972)
- Mingus Moves (Atlantic, 1973)
- Changes Two (Atlantic, 1974)
