= Mingus Plays Piano =

Studio album by Charles Mingus
- Released: 1964
- Recorded: July 30, 1963
- Genre: Jazz
- Length: 50:03
- Label: Impulse!
- Producer: Bob Thiele

Charles Mingus chronology
Tonight at Noon (1964)	Mingus Plays Piano (1964)	Town Hall Concert (1964)

Professional ratings
Review scores
Source	Rating
AllMusic	4/5 stars
The Penguin Guide to Jazz Recordings	3/4 stars
The Rolling Stone Jazz Record Guide	3/5 stars

Mingus Plays Piano is a 1964 solo jazz album by Charles Mingus. The album is notable for Mingus's departure from his usual role as composer and double-bassist in ensemble recordings, instead playing piano without any additional musicians.

== Track listing ==
1. "Myself When I Am Real" – 7:38
2. "I Can't Get Started" (Vernon Duke, Ira Gershwin) – 3:43
3. "Body and Soul" (Frank Eyton, Johnny Green, Edward Heyman, Robert Sour) – 4:35
4. "Roland Kirk's Message" – 2:43
5. "Memories of You" (Eubie Blake, Andy Razaf) – 4:37
6. "She's Just Miss Popular Hybrid" – 3:11
7. "Orange Was the Color of Her Dress, Then Silk Blues" – 4:18
8. "Meditations for Moses" – 3:38
9. "Old Portrait" – 3:49
10. "I'm Getting Sentimental Over You" (George Bassman, Ned Washington) – 3:46
11. Compositional Theme Story: "Medleys, Anthems and Folklore" – 8:35

All music composed by Charles Mingus unless otherwise noted.

== Personnel ==
- Charles Mingus - piano, vocals

== Production ==
- Bob Thiele - producer, photography
- Michael Cuscuna - reissue producer
- Bob Simpson - engineer
- Erick Labson - digital remastering
- Nat Hentoff - liner notes
- Victor Kalin - cover painting
- Hollis King - art direction, design
- Joe Lebow - liner design
- Lee Tanner - photography
