= Honi Gordon Sings =

Studio album by Honi Gordon
- Recorded: March 23, 1962
- Genre: Jazz
- Label: Prestige

Professional ratings
Review scores
Source	Rating
AllMusic	4.5/5 stars

Honi Gordon Sings is the only album recorded as a leader by jazz vocalist Honi Gordon.

== Background ==
Honi Gordon sang as a member of the Gordons (with her father and two brothers) in the early 1950s. Her first recordings, in 1953, were with them.

== Recording and music ==
Honi Gordon Sings was recorded on March 23, 1962. The other musicians on the recording are Makanda Ken McIntyre (alto sax, flute), Wally Richardson (guitar), Jaki Byard (piano), George Duvivier (bass), and Ed Shaughnessy (drums).

== Releases ==
The album was originally released on LP by Prestige Records. It was re-released on CD in 1992.

== Reception ==
The AllMusic reviewer commented that the album presented "bop-based jazz singing at its best." Gordon's version of "Strollin'" was described as "definitive".

== Track listing ==
1. "Strollin'" – 4:30
2. "Ill Wind" – 2:30
3. "My Kokomo" – 5:15
4. "Why Try to Change Me Now?" – 4:55
5. "Cupid" – 3:20
6. "Walkin' (Out the Door)" – 3:05
7. "Why" – 3:20
8. "Love Affair" – 3:40
9. "Lament of the Lonely" – 3:00

== Personnel ==
- Honi Gordon – vocals
- Ken McIntyre – alto sax, flute
- Wally Richardson – guitar
- Jaki Byard – piano
- George Duvivier – bass
- Ed Shaughnessy – drums
