= Flamingo (song) =

1940 jazz standard by Ted Grouya

Song by Herb Jeffries and the Duke Ellington Orchestra
- Written: 1940
- Recorded: December 28, 1940
- Genre: Jazz standard
- Songwriter: Ted Grouya
- Lyricist: Edmund Anderson

"Flamingo" (1940) is a popular song and jazz standard written by Ted Grouya, with lyrics by Edmund Anderson, which was first recorded by singer Herb Jeffries and the Duke Ellington Orchestra on December 28, 1940, for Victor Records (catalog No. 27326B). This recording briefly reached the Billboard charts in 1941.

== Versions that charted in the U.S. ==
- Duke Ellington and his Famous Orchestra, vocal refrain by Herb Jeffries. Victor 27326. Charted number 13 in 1941.
- Earl Bostic and his Orchestra. King 4475. Charted number 1, R&B in 1951.
- The Gaylords (American vocal group). As "Flamingo L'Amore". Mercury 71369. Charted number 98, Pop in 1958.
- Little Willie John. King 5503. Charted number 17, R&B in 1961.
- Herb Alpert & the Tijuana Brass. A&M 813. Charted number 28, Pop and number 5, Easy Listening in 1966.

== Other notable versions ==
- Bob Crosby and His Orchestra – recorded for Decca Records (catalog No. 3752A) on March 28, 1941.
- Tony Martin – recorded for Decca Records (catalog No. 3857A) on May 29, 1941.
- Jimmie Lunceford and His Orchestra (vocal by Dan Grissom) – recorded for Decca Records (catalog No. 3931A) on June 23, 1941.
- Arild Andresen, piano with guitar and bass, recorded it in Oslo on March 11, 1955, as the third melody of the medley "Klaver-Cocktail Nr. 3" along with "Sophisticated Lady" and "With a Song in My Heart". The medley was released on the 78 rpm record His Master's Voice A.L. 3514.
- Bobby Jaspar, with Blossom Dearie at the piano, recorded at the Barclay EP No. 74 017 in Paris (1956)
