= Ted Grouya =

Romanian-American composer (1910–2000)

Ted Grouya (31 July 1910 – 14 April 2000) born Teodor Gruia in Bucharest, Romania, was a Romanian-American composer who studied composition with Nadia Boulanger. He wrote the jazz standard "Flamingo" (1940), first recorded by Herb Jeffries and Duke Ellington. He also co-wrote the song "I Heard You Cried Last Night."

Grouya also wrote the music for the film version of Our Hearts Were Young and Gay (1944) and other films. In 1949 he married American actress Mary Meade.

A one time resident of Palm Springs, California, Grouya had a Golden Palm Star on the Palm Springs Walk of Stars dedicated to him in 1995.
