= Town Hall Concert =

Live album by Charles Mingus
- Released: 1964
- Recorded: April 4, 1964
- Genre: Jazz
- Length: 45:19
- Label: Jazz Workshop JWS 005

Charles Mingus chronology
Mingus Plays Piano (1964)	Town Hall Concert (1964)	Revenge! (1964)

Professional ratings
Review scores
Source	Rating
AllMusic	4/5 stars
The Penguin Guide to Jazz Recordings	4/4 stars
The Rolling Stone Jazz Record Guide	5/5 stars

Town Hall Concert is a 1964 live album by the jazz bassist and composer Charles Mingus. It was recorded in New York City at The Town Hall on April 4, 1964. "So Long Eric" is a 12-bar blues that got its name after Eric Dolphy informed Mingus he would be leaving the band to stay in Europe before a concert in Oslo. "Praying With Eric" is more commonly known as "Meditations On Integration". The album was originally released on Mingus' own Jazz Workshop label and rereleased on Fantasy as part of their Original Jazz Classics series.

== Track listing ==
All songs written by Charles Mingus.

1. "So Long Eric" – 17:48
2. "Praying With Eric" – 27:31

== Personnel ==
- Charles Mingus – bass
- Eric Dolphy – alto saxophone, bass clarinet, flute
- Johnny Coles – trumpet
- Clifford Jordan – tenor saxophone
- Jaki Byard – piano
- Dannie Richmond – drums
