= East Coasting =

Studio album by Charles Mingus
- Released: November or December 1957
- Recorded: August 16, 1957
- Genre: Jazz
- Length: 38:49
- Label: Bethlehem; BCP 6019

Charles Mingus chronology
Mingus Three (1957)	East Coasting (1957)	Weary Blues (1958)

East Coasting is an album by Charles Mingus, recorded and released in late 1957. It was reissued on CD with bonus takes in 1993.

== Reception ==
The AllMusic review by Scott Yanow stated: "One of Charles Mingus's lesser-known band sessions, this set of five of his originals (plus the standard 'Memories of You') features his usual sidemen of the period (trombonist Jimmy Knepper, trumpeter Clarence Shaw, Shafi Hadi on tenor and alto and drummer Dannie Richmond) along with pianist Bill Evans. The music stretches the boundaries of bop, is never predictable and, even if this is not one of Mingus's more acclaimed dates, it is well worth acquiring for the playing is quite stimulating."

Professional ratings
Review scores
Source	Rating
AllMusic	4/5 stars
The Rolling Stone Album Guide	4/5 stars

== Track listing ==
1. "Memories of You" [Take 7] (Eubie Blake, Andy Razaf) - 4:27
2. "East Coasting" [Take 4] - 5:13
3. "West Coast Ghost" [Take 6] - 10:28
4. "Celia" [Take 5] - 7:54
5. "Conversation" [Take 16] - 5:28
6. "Fifty-First Street Blues" [Take 4] - 5:48
7. "East Coasting" [alternate take] - 5:30
8. "Memories of You" [alternate take] (Blake, Razaf) - 4:42
9. "Revelations" - 12:05
10. "Woody 'n' You" (Dizzy Gillespie) - 8:44
11. "Billie's Bounce" (Charlie Parker) - 9:08

Tracks 1 through 6 comprise the original album; 7 and 8 are bonus tracks; 9 through 11 are taken from other 1957 sessions and included on a 2010 CD reissue.
Tracks 1 through 8 recorded August 16, 1957, in New York City.
Track 9 recorded June 18, 1957, in New York City.
Tracks 10 and 11 recorded October 1957, in New York City.

== Personnel ==
- Charles Mingus – bass
- Clarence Shaw - trumpet (1–8)
- Jimmy Knepper - trombone
- Shafi Hadi - alto saxophone (1–8, 10, 11), tenor saxophone (10, 11)
- Bill Evans - piano (1–9)
- Horace Parlan - piano (10, 11)
- Dannie Richmond - drums (1–8, 10, 11)

Track 9 was recorded by the Jazz Workshop, a larger ensemble organized and led by Mingus that included Knepper and Evans.
