= Let My Children Hear Music =

Studio album by Charles Mingus
- Released: February 1, 1972
- Recorded: September 23 – November 18, 1971
- Genre: Avant-garde jazz, third stream
- Length: 59:33
- Label: Columbia
- Producer: Teo Macero

Charles Mingus chronology
Charles Mingus with Orchestra (1971)	Let My Children Hear Music (1972)	Charles Mingus and Friends in Concert (1972)

Professional ratings
Review scores
Source	Rating
Allmusic	5/5 stars
DownBeat	5/5 stars
The Rolling Stone Jazz Record Guide	5/5 stars

Let My Children Hear Music is an album released by Columbia Records in 1972 of music by composer Charles Mingus, produced by Teo Macero. The music is scored for large jazz orchestra and Mingus worked with several arrangers, orchestrators and conductors, most notably Sy Johnson and Alan Raph, to realize some of his most ambitious compositions. In the original liner notes, Mingus described it as "the best album I have ever made".

Mingus was nominated for the 1973 Grammy Award for Best Album Notes (Non-Classical) for the album, losing to Tom T. Hall for Tom T. Hall's Greatest Hits.

== Track listing ==
All tracks composed by Charles Mingus.

1. "The Shoes of the Fisherman's Wife Are Some Jiveass Slippers" – 9:34
2. "Adagio ma Non Troppo" – 8:22
3. "Don't Be Afraid, the Clown's Afraid Too" – 9:26
4. "Taurus in the Arena of Life" – 4:17 (on CD reissue)
5. "Hobo Ho" – 10:07
6. "The Chill of Death" – 7:38
7. "The I of Hurricane Sue" – 10:09

== Personnel ==
The soloists are listed below:

- Lonnie Hillyer – trumpet
- Julius Watkins – French horn
- Bobby Jones – tenor saxophone
- Joe Wilder – trumpet
- Charles McCracken – cello
- Charles McPherson – alto saxophone
- James Moody – tenor saxophone
- Sir Roland Hanna – piano
- Snooky Young – lead trumpet throughout
- Dannie Richmond – drums
