= Quintorigo =

- Origin: Forlì, Emilia-Romagna, Italy
- Genres: Jazz, art rock, experimental, experimental rock, jazz funk, jazz-rock, avant-garde jazz, art pop
- Years active: 1996–present
- Labels: Universal Music, Exess, Sam Productions, Edel, Metro Music Network
- Members: Valentino Bianchi; Andrea Costa; Gionata Costa; Stefano Ricci; Alessio Velliscig
- Past members: Luisa Cottifogli; John de Leo; Luca Sapio
- Website: www.quintorigo.com

Quintorigo is an Italian band founded in 1996 by John de Leo, who left the band in 2005. Their genre vary from experimental, jazz, reggae, pop and rock music. Although the musical ensemble is composed only by acoustic instruments, the band often makes heavy use of sound effects like distortion, flanging and wah-wah. They won the Mia Martini critics award at Sanremo Festival in 1999.

== Band members ==
- Andrea Costa - violin
- Gionata Costa - cello
- Stefano Ricci - double bass
- Valentino Bianchi - saxophones

=== Former members ===
- John De Leo - vocals, left the group in 2005
- Luisa Cottifogli - vocals, left the group in 2009
- Luca Sapio - vocals, left the group in 2012

== Discography ==
=== Albums ===
- Dietro le quinte (1998)
- Rospo (1999)
- Grigio (2001)
- In Cattività (2003)
- Il Cannone (2006)
- Quinto (2006)
- Play Mingus (2008)
- English Garden (2011)
- Quintorigo Experience (2012)
- Around Zappa (2015)
- Opposites (2018)
- Play Mingus, Vol.2 (2022)

=== Singles ===
- Bentivoglio Angelina (2001)

=== Live recordings ===
- Nel Vivo (2004)
- Around Zappa (2015, DVD, at Blue note, Milan)
