= Boris Kozlov =

Russian bassist (born 1967)

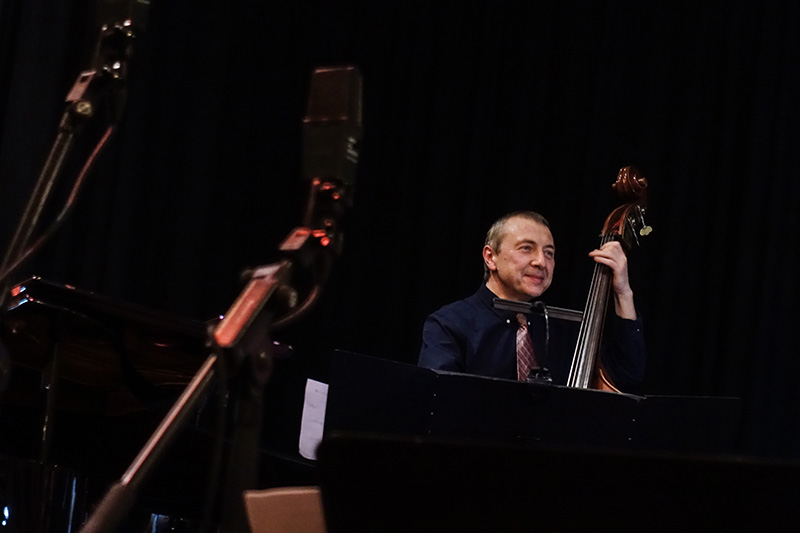
- Photo Hreinn Gudlaugsson

Background information
- Born: Boris Kozlov; December 5, 1967; Moscow, U.S.S.R.
- Genres: Jazz, hard bop, bebop, Latin Jazz
- Occupation: Musician
- Instruments: Double bass, Electric Bass Guitar, piano

Boris Kozlov (born 5 December 1967) is a Russian-born jazz bassist.

== Biography ==
Born in Moscow, USSR on December 5, 1967, Kozlov studied piano at Children's Music School before switching to bass. Kozlov won the Gnesin Music Academy Competition which enabled him to enter college at age 15 and study electric bass guitar.

After graduation Kozlov did a mandatory two-year military service where he played tuba and other brass instruments. After leaving the service, Kozlov played with the Soviet state-owned "Melodia" Studio Ensemble in 1989 and in 1991 won the USSR Competition of Jazz soloists. He then moved to New York City to study and perform jazz.

Kozlov has played on two Grammy Award-winning albums, the first with Brian Lynch and the second with Mingus Big Band (Live at Jazz Standard) in 2011. Kozlov has performed as musical director of the latter band.

Kozlov has performed with Lew Tabackin, Bobby Watson, Michael Brecker, Alex Sipiagin among others.

As a solo artist, Kozlov has released Double Standard in 2010 and as bandleader Conversations At The Well in 2016.
