= Sue Mingus =

American record producer and band manager (1930–2022)

- Born: Susan Graham; April 2, 1930; Chicago, Illinois, U.S.
- Died: September 24, 2022 (aged 92) New York City, U.S.
- Genre: Jazz
- Occupations: Record producer, band manager
- Label: Mingus Music
- Website: www.charlesmingus.com/sue-mingus

Susan Mingus (née Graham, April 2, 1930 – September 24, 2022) was an American record producer and band manager. She was married to jazz composer and bassist Charles Mingus, and formed tribute groups to perform his music after his death. She won a Grammy Award in 2011, having earlier received four nominations.

== Early life ==
Susan Graham was born in Chicago on April 2, 1930. Her father, Louis, was a mathematician and engineer who had aspired to be an opera singer; her mother was a housewife who played the harp and piano. Susan grew up in Milwaukee and attended an all-girls schools. She studied at Smith College, graduating in 1952. She then worked as an editor of the International Herald Tribune in Paris for two years, before being employed by Clipper, Pan Am's in-flight magazine, in Rome.

== Career ==
Sue was acting in O.K. End Here (1963), an experimental film directed by Robert Frank, when she first met Charles Mingus. They had an unofficial marriage ceremony conducted by Allen Ginsberg in 1966, before being married legally a decade later.

After her husband's death from ALS in 1979, Mingus established bands to perform his music, beginning with the Mingus Dynasty, a septet that tours internationally and performs regularly at Jazz Standard in New York City. The Dynasty alternates with the Mingus Big Band and Mingus Orchestra. Mingus produced several albums with these bands. One of these, Mingus Big Band Live at Jazz Standard, won the Grammy Award for Best Large Jazz Ensemble Album in 2011. Four other albums were nominated for Grammys in 1997, 1999, 2003, and 2007.

Mingus produced two legacy albums: Charles Mingus: Music Written for Monterey, 1965 (Mingus Music, 2006) and Charles Mingus Sextet with Eric Dolphy, Cornell 1964 (Blue Note, 2007). She later produced Mingus's Epitaph, first in 1989 for its premiere at Alice Tully Hall at Lincoln Center for thirty-one musicians, and again in 2007 when it toured four cities and was broadcast by National Public Radio. Through Mingus's publishing company Jazz Workshop, she published educational books, Charles Mingus: More than a Fake Book, Charles Mingus: More than a Play Along, dozens of Mingus Big Band charts, guitar and piano charts, and a series for students called Simply Mingus.

In 2002, Mingus published a memoir titled Tonight at Noon: a Love Story. It was named Los Angeles Times Best Book of the Year and a New York Times Notable Book. Seven years later, through Let My Children Hear Music – the nonprofit created to promote Mingus' music – she presented the First Annual Charles Mingus High School Competition at the Manhattan School of Music with Justin DiCioccio. Today, the program is run in partnership with the School of Jazz and Contemporary Music at The New School.

Susan Mingus was honored as an NEA Jazz Masters fellow in July 2022.

== Personal life ==
Mingus married her first husband, artist Alberto Ungaro, in 1958. They met in Rome while she was working there. Together, they had two children. They separated after several years of marriage before his death in 1968. She then married famous American Jazz musician Charles (Charlie) Mingus (1922-1979) in 1975. They had met nine years earlier during his concert at the Five Spot Café and they remained married until his 1979 death.

Sue Mingus died on September 24, 2022, at a hospital in Manhattan, aged 92.

Her grandson was James Kent (chef).
