= Charles Mingus =

American jazz musician (1922–1979)

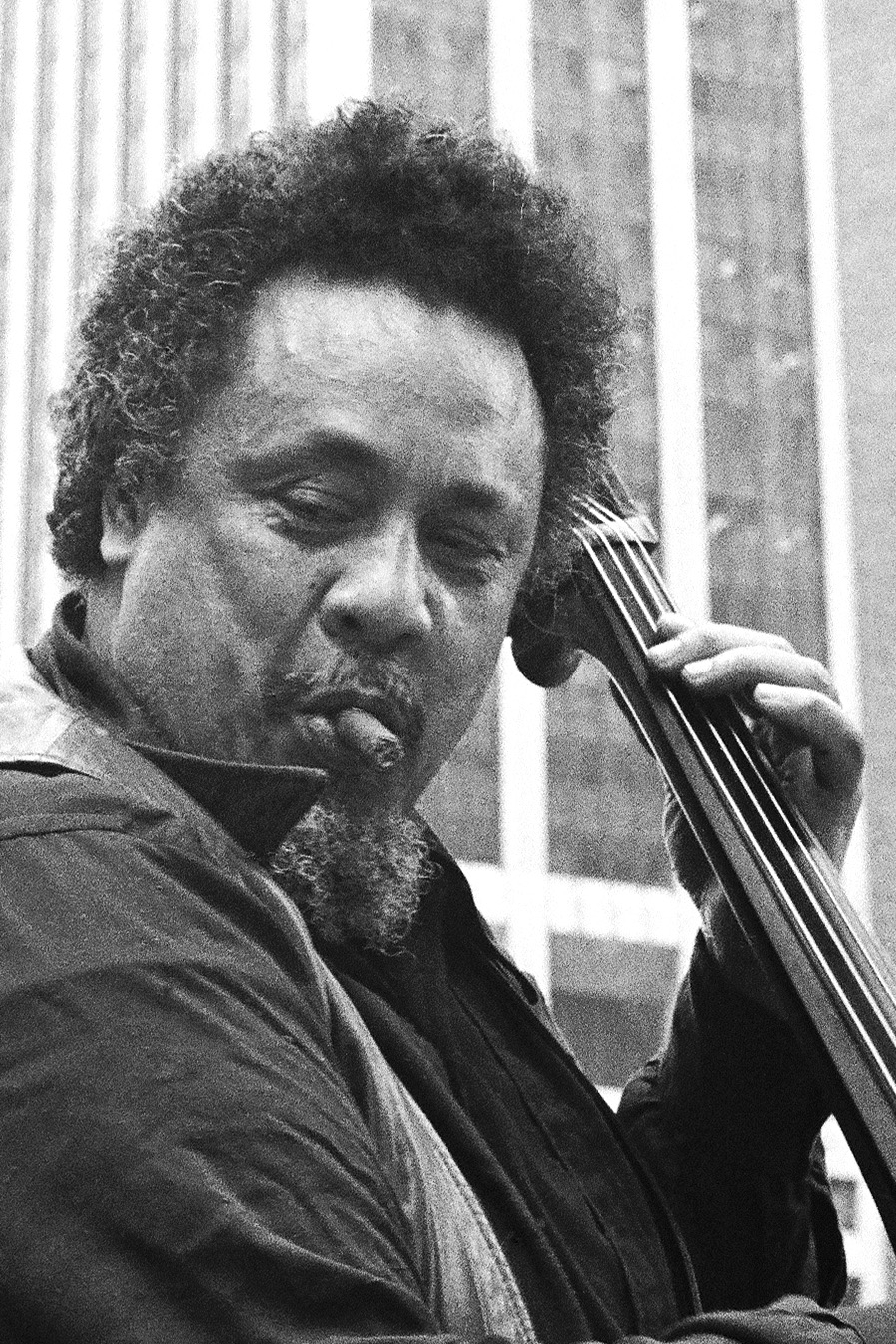
- Mingus in 1976

Background information
- Also known as: Charlie Mingus
- Born: Charles Mingus Jr. April 22, 1922; Nogales, Arizona, U.S.
- Origin: Los Angeles, California, U.S.
- Died: January 5, 1979 (aged 56) Cuernavaca, Mexico
- Genres: Jazz; hard bop; bebop; avant-garde jazz; post-bop; third stream; orchestral jazz
- Occupations: Musician; composer; bandleader
- Instruments: Double bass; piano; vocals
- Years active: 1943–1979
- Labels: Atlantic; Candid; Columbia; Debut; Impulse!; Mercury; United Artists
- Website: www.charlesmingus.com

Charles Mingus Jr. (April 22, 1922 – January 5, 1979) was an American jazz upright bassist, composer, bandleader, pianist, and author. A major proponent of collective improvisation, he is considered one of the greatest jazz musicians and composers in history, with a career spanning three decades and collaborations with other jazz greats, such as Duke Ellington, Charlie Parker, Max Roach, and Eric Dolphy. Mingus's work ranged from advanced bebop and avant-garde jazz with small and midsize ensembles to pioneering the post-bop style on seminal recordings like Pithecanthropus Erectus (1956) and Mingus Ah Um (1959) and progressive big band experiments such as The Black Saint and the Sinner Lady (1963).

Mingus's compositions continue to be played by contemporary musicians ranging from the repertory bands Mingus Big Band, Mingus Dynasty, and Mingus Orchestra to high school students who play the charts and compete in the Charles Mingus High School Competition. In 1993, the Library of Congress acquired Mingus's collected papers—including scores, sound recordings, correspondence, and photos—in what it called "the most important acquisition of a manuscript collection relating to jazz in the Library's history".

== Biography ==
=== Early life and career ===
Mingus was born in Nogales, Arizona, in 1922, to Charles Mingus Sr., a staff sergeant in the U.S. Army, and Harriet Sophia Mingus (née Phillips). His family moved to the Watts area of Los Angeles shortly after his birth.

Charles Sr. was born in 1877 in Swain County, North Carolina, in the Great Smoky Mountains. His mother was a white teenager, Clarinda Mingus; his father was Daniel Mingus, a farmhand and former slave who worked for Clarinda's family. Clarinda married and started a new family when he was six, leaving him in the care of her father and grandparents. He left home at fourteen, enlisting in the army and seeing action in the Spanish–American War. In 1917, he married Harriet Sophia Phillips, who was of mixed Chinese and African-American descent. She died of myocarditis in 1922, a few months after the birth of their son.

Mingus was raised alongside his two elder half-sisters, from his father's first marriage. His father was married for a third time in 1923, to Mamie Carson. Mamie allowed only church-related music in their home, but Mingus developed an early love for other music, especially that of Duke Ellington. He studied trombone, and later cello, although he was unable to follow the cello professionally because, at the time, it was nearly impossible for a black musician to make a career of classical music, and the cello was not accepted as a jazz instrument. Despite this, Mingus remained attached to the cello; as he studied bass with Red Callender in the late 1930s, Callender even commented that the cello was still Mingus's main instrument. In his autobiography, Beneath the Underdog, Mingus states that he did not actually start learning bass until Buddy Collette accepted him into his swing band under the stipulation that he be the band's bass player.

Due to a poor education, the young Mingus could not read musical notation quickly enough to join the local youth orchestra. This had a serious impact on his early musical experiences, leaving him feeling ostracized from the classical music world. These early experiences, in addition to his lifelong confrontations with racism, were reflected in his music, which often focused on themes of racism, discrimination, and (in)justice.

Much of the cello technique Mingus learned was applicable to double bass when he took up the instrument in high school. He studied for five years with Herman Reinshagen, principal bassist of the New York Philharmonic, and compositional techniques with Lloyd Reese. Throughout much of his career, he played a bass made in 1927 by the German maker Ernst Heinrich Roth.

Mingus was already writing relatively advanced musical pieces in his teenage years; many are similar to third stream in that they incorporate elements of classical music. A number of pieces of his were recorded in 1960 with conductor Gunther Schuller and released as Pre-Bird, referring to Charlie "Bird" Parker; Mingus was one of many musicians whose perspectives on music were altered by Parker into "pre- and post-Bird" eras.

Mingus gained a reputation as a bass prodigy. His first major professional job was playing with former Ellington clarinetist Barney Bigard. He toured with Louis Armstrong in 1943, and by early 1945 was recording in Los Angeles in a band led by Russell Jacquet, which also included Teddy Edwards, Maurice James Simon, Wild Bill Davis, and Chico Hamilton. In May that year, in Hollywood, he was again with Edwards, in a band led by Howard McGhee.

He then played with Lionel Hampton's band in the late 1940s; Hampton performed and recorded several Mingus pieces. In 1950–51, a popular trio of Mingus, Red Norvo and Tal Farlow, received considerable acclaim, but Mingus's race caused problems with some club owners and he left the group. Mingus was briefly a member of Ellington's band in 1953, as a substitute for bassist Wendell Marshall; however, Mingus's notorious temper led to his being one of the few musicians personally fired by Ellington (Bubber Miley and drummer Bobby Durham are among the others) after a backstage fight between Mingus and Juan Tizol.

Also in the early 1950s, before attaining commercial recognition as a bandleader, Mingus played gigs with Charlie Parker, whose compositions and improvisations greatly inspired and influenced him. Mingus considered Parker the greatest genius and innovator in jazz history, but he had a love-hate relationship with Parker's legacy. Mingus blamed the Parker mythology for a derivative crop of pretenders to Parker's throne. He was also conflicted and sometimes disgusted by Parker's self-destructive habits and the romanticized lure of drug addiction they offered to other jazz musicians. In response to the many sax players who imitated Parker, Mingus titled a song "If Charlie Parker Were a Gunslinger, There'd Be a Whole Lot of Dead Copycats" (released on Mingus Dynasty as "Gunslinging Bird").

Mingus was married at least four times. His wives were Jeanne Gross, Lucille (Celia) Germanis (1951-1958), Judy Starkey (?-1970), and Susan Graham Ungaro. (1975-1979).

=== Based in New York ===
In 1952, Mingus co-founded Debut Records with Max Roach so that he could conduct his recording career as he saw fit. The name originated from his desire to document unrecorded young musicians. Despite this, the best-known recording the company issued was of the most prominent figures in bebop. On May 15, 1953, Mingus joined Dizzy Gillespie, Parker, Bud Powell, and Roach for a concert at Massey Hall in Toronto, which is the last recorded documentation of Gillespie and Parker playing together. After the event, Mingus chose to overdub his barely audible bass part back in New York; the original version was issued later. The two 10″ albums of the Massey Hall concert (one featured the trio of Powell, Mingus, and Roach) were among Debut Records' earliest releases. Mingus may have objected to the way the major record companies treated musicians, but Gillespie once commented that he did not receive any royalties "for years and years" for his Massey Hall appearance. The records, however, are often regarded as among the finest live jazz recordings.

One story has it that Mingus was involved in a notorious incident while playing a 1955 club date billed as a "reunion" with Parker, Powell, and Roach. Powell, who suffered from alcoholism and mental illness (possibly exacerbated by a severe police beating and electroshock treatments), had to be helped from the stage, unable to play or speak coherently. As Powell's incapacitation became apparent, Parker stood in one spot at a microphone, chanting "Bud Powell ... Bud Powell ..." as if beseeching Powell's return. Allegedly, Parker continued this incantation for several minutes after Powell's departure, to his own amusement and Mingus's exasperation. Mingus took another microphone and announced to the crowd, "Ladies and Gentlemen, please don't associate me with any of this. This is not jazz. These are sick people." This was Parker's last public performance; about a week later he died after years of substance abuse.

Mingus often worked with a mid-sized ensemble (around 8–10 members) of rotating musicians known as the Jazz Workshop. Mingus broke new ground, constantly demanding that his musicians be able to explore and develop their perceptions on the spot. Those who joined the Workshop (or Sweatshops as they were colorfully dubbed by the musicians) included Pepper Adams, Jaki Byard, Booker Ervin, John Handy, Jimmy Knepper, Charles McPherson, and Horace Parlan. Mingus shaped these musicians into a cohesive improvisational machine that in many ways anticipated free jazz. Some musicians dubbed the workshop a "university" for jazz.

=== Pithecanthropus Erectus and other recordings ===
The 1950s are generally regarded as Mingus's most productive and fertile period. Over a ten-year period, he made 30 records for a number of labels (Atlantic, Candid, Columbia, Impulse!, and others). Mingus had already recorded around ten albums as a bandleader, but 1956 was a breakthrough year for him, with the release of Pithecanthropus Erectus, arguably his first major work as both a bandleader and composer. Like Ellington, Mingus wrote songs with specific musicians in mind, and his band for Erectus included adventurous musicians: piano player Mal Waldron, alto saxophonist Jackie McLean, and the Sonny Rollins–influenced tenor of J. R. Monterose. The title song is a ten-minute tone poem depicting the rise of man from his hominid roots (Pithecanthropus erectus) to an eventual downfall. A section of the piece was free improvisation, free of structure or theme.

Another album from this period, The Clown (1957, also on Atlantic Records), the title track of which features narration by humorist Jean Shepherd, was the first to feature drummer Dannie Richmond, who remained his preferred drummer until Mingus's death in 1979. The two men formed one of the most impressive and versatile rhythm sections in jazz. Both were accomplished performers seeking to stretch the boundaries of their music while staying true to its roots. When joined by pianist Jaki Byard, they were dubbed "The Almighty Three".

=== Mingus Ah Um and other works ===
In 1959, Mingus and his jazz workshop musicians recorded one of his best-known albums, Mingus Ah Um. Even in a year of standout masterpieces, including Dave Brubeck's Time Out, Miles Davis's Kind of Blue, John Coltrane's Giant Steps, and Ornette Coleman's The Shape of Jazz to Come, this was a major achievement, featuring such classic Mingus compositions as "Goodbye Pork Pie Hat" (an elegy to Lester Young) and the vocal-less version of "Fables of Faubus" (a protest against segregationist Arkansas governor Orval Faubus that features double-time sections). In 2003, the album's legacy was cemented when it was inducted into the National Recording Registry. Also during 1959, Mingus recorded the album Blues & Roots, which was released the following year. Mingus said in his liner notes, "I was born swinging and clapped my hands in church as a little boy, but I've grown up and I like to do things other than just swing. But blues can do more than just swing."

Mingus witnessed Ornette Coleman's legendary—and controversial—1960 appearances at New York City's Five Spot jazz club. He initially expressed rather mixed feelings for Coleman's innovative music: "... if the free-form guys could play the same tune twice, then I would say they were playing something ... Most of the time they use their fingers on the saxophone and they don't even know what's going to come out. They're experimenting." That same year, however, Mingus formed a quartet with Richmond, trumpeter Ted Curson, and multi-instrumentalist Eric Dolphy. This ensemble featured the same instruments as Coleman's quartet and is often regarded as Mingus rising to the challenging new standard established by Coleman. The quartet recorded on both Charles Mingus Presents Charles Mingus and Mingus. The former also features a version of "Fables of Faubus" with lyrics, aptly titled "Original Faubus Fables".

In 1960, Mingus organized with Max Roach a concert in protest against the Newport Jazz Festival and George Wein's low payment of musicians, known as the Newport Rebels festival or Cliff Walk Manor festival (sometimes referred to as "the protest festival").. The project led to the studio album (not live from the festival) Newport Rebels.

In 1961, Mingus spent time staying at the house of his mother's sister (Louise) and her husband, Fess Williams, a clarinetist and saxophonist, in Jamaica, Queens. Subsequently, Mingus invited Williams to play at the 1962 Town Hall Concert.

Only one misstep occurred in this era: The Town Hall Concert in October 1962, a "live workshop" and recording session. With an ambitious program, the event was plagued with troubles from its inception. Mingus's vision, now known as Epitaph, was finally realized by conductor Gunther Schuller in a concert in 1989, a decade after Mingus died.

Outside of music, Mingus published a mail-order how-to guide in 1954 called The Charles Mingus CAT-alog for Toilet Training Your Cat. The guide explained in detail how to get a cat to use a human toilet. Sixty years later, in 2014, the late American character actor Reg E. Cathey performed a voice recording of the complete guide for Studio 360.

=== The Black Saint and the Sinner Lady and other Impulse! albums ===
In 1963, Mingus released The Black Saint and the Sinner Lady, described as "one of the greatest achievements in orchestration by any composer in jazz history." The album was also unique in that Mingus asked his psychotherapist, Dr. Edmund Pollock, to provide notes for the record.

Mingus also released Mingus Plays Piano, an unaccompanied album featuring some fully improvised pieces, in 1963.

In addition, 1964 saw the release of Mingus Mingus Mingus Mingus Mingus, an album praised by critic Nat Hentoff.

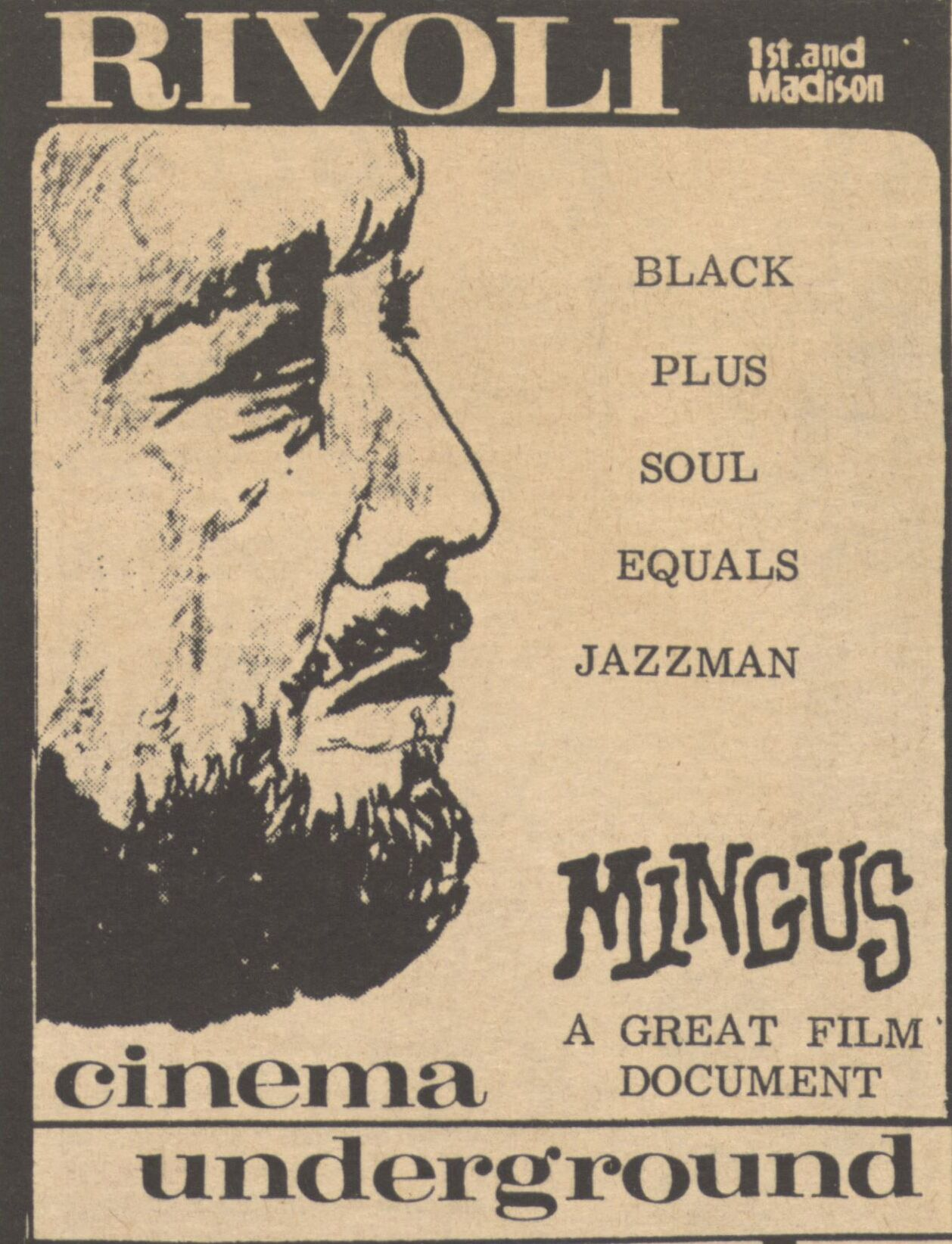
Ad for Thomas Reichman's 1968 Mingus documentary.

In 1964, Mingus put together one of his best-known groups, a sextet including Dannie Richmond, Jaki Byard, Eric Dolphy, trumpeter Johnny Coles, and tenor saxophonist Clifford Jordan. The group was recorded frequently during its short existence. Mosaic Records released a 7-CD set, Charles Mingus – The Jazz Workshop Concerts 1964–65, featuring concerts from Town Hall, Amsterdam, Monterey '64, Monterey '65, and Minneapolis). Coles fell ill and left during a European tour. Dolphy stayed in Europe after the tour ended, and died suddenly in Berlin on June 28, 1964. 1964 was also the year that Mingus met his future wife, Sue Graham Ungaro. The couple were married in 1966 by Allen Ginsberg. Facing financial hardship, Mingus was evicted from his New York home in 1966.

=== Changes ===
Mingus's pace slowed somewhat in the late 1960s and early 1970s. In 1974, after his 1970 sextet with Charles McPherson, Eddie Preston, and Bobby Jones disbanded, he formed a quintet with Richmond, pianist Don Pullen, trumpeter Jack Walrath, and saxophonist George Adams. They recorded two well-received albums, Changes One and Changes Two. Mingus also played with Charles McPherson in many of his groups during this time. Cumbia & Jazz Fusion in 1976 sought to blend Colombian music (the "Cumbia" of the title) with more traditional jazz forms. In 1971, Mingus taught for a semester at the University at Buffalo, the State University of New York, as the Slee Professor of Music.

=== Later career and death ===
By the mid-1970s, Mingus was feeling the effects of motor neuron disease (also known as ALS). His once formidable bass technique declined until he could no longer play the instrument. He continued composing, however, and supervised a number of recordings before his death. At the time of his death, he was working with Joni Mitchell on an album eventually titled Mingus, which included lyrics added by Mitchell to his compositions, including "Goodbye Pork Pie Hat". The album featured Wayne Shorter, Herbie Hancock, and bassist and composer Jaco Pastorius.

Mingus died of a heart attack on January 5, 1979, aged 56, in Cuernavaca, Mexico, where he had traveled for treatment and convalescence. His ashes were scattered in the Ganges River.

== Musical style ==
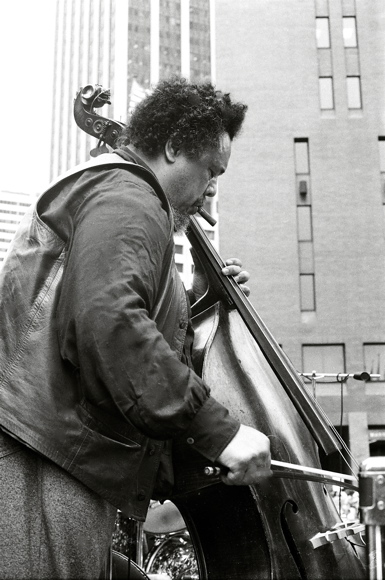
Mingus in 1976 playing the double bass

Mingus's compositions retained the hot and soulful feel of hard bop, drawing heavily from black gospel music and blues, while sometimes containing elements of third stream, free jazz, and classical music. He once cited Duke Ellington and church as his main influences.

Mingus espoused collective improvisation, similar to the old New Orleans jazz parades, paying particular attention to how each band member interacted with the group as a whole. In creating his bands, he looked not only at the skills of the available musicians, but also their personalities. Many musicians passed through his bands and later went on to impressive careers. He recruited talented and sometimes little-known artists, whom he utilized to assemble unconventional instrumental configurations. As a performer, Mingus was a pioneer in double bass technique, widely recognized as one of the instrument's most proficient players.

Because of his brilliant writing for midsize ensembles, and his catering to and emphasizing the strengths of the musicians in his groups, Mingus is often considered the heir of Duke Ellington, for whom he expressed great admiration and with whom he collaborated on the record Money Jungle. Dizzy Gillespie had once said Mingus reminded him "of a young Duke", citing their shared "organizational genius".

== Personality ==
Mingus had a notoriously fiery temperament, which earned him the nickname "the Angry Man of Jazz". His refusal to compromise his musical integrity led to many onstage outbursts, which were directed at members of his band and the audience alike; in 1965, midway through a performance, he ordered half his band backstage to practice. Noisy audiences were subject to expressions of ire. Mingus chastised one such with "Isaac Stern doesn't have to put up with this shit", and on another occasion ordered his band to read books instead of playing. Also in the 1960s, playing a gig at the Five Spot Café in New York City, Mingus reportedly destroyed a $20,000 bass in response to hecklers in the audience.

Guitarist and singer Jackie Paris was a witness to Mingus's irascibility. Paris recalls his time in the Jazz Workshop: "He chased everybody off the stand except [drummer] Paul Motian and me ... The three of us just wailed on the blues for about an hour and a half before he called the other cats back."

On October 12, 1962, Mingus punched Jimmy Knepper in the mouth while the two men were working together at Mingus's apartment on a score for his upcoming concert at the Town Hall in New York, and Knepper refused to take on more work. Mingus's blow broke off a crowned tooth and its underlying stub. According to Knepper, this ruined his embouchure and resulted in the permanent loss of the top octave of his range on the trombone – a significant handicap for any professional trombonist. This attack temporarily ended their working relationship, and Knepper was unable to perform at the concert. Charged with assault, Mingus appeared in court in January 1963 and was given a suspended sentence. Knepper did again work with Mingus in 1977 and played extensively with the Mingus Dynasty, formed after Mingus's death in 1979.

In addition to bouts of ill temper, Mingus was prone to clinical depression and tended to have brief periods of extreme creative activity intermixed with fairly long stretches of greatly decreased output, such as the five-year period following the death of Eric Dolphy.

In 1966, Mingus was evicted from his apartment at 5 Great Jones Street in New York City for nonpayment of rent, captured in the 1968 documentary film Mingus: Charlie Mingus 1968, directed by Thomas Reichman. The film was inducted into the National Film Registry in 2022. The film also features Mingus performing in clubs and in the apartment, firing a .410 bore shotgun indoors, composing at the piano, playing with and taking care of his young daughter Carolyn, and discussing love, art, politics, and the music school he had hoped to create.

== Legacy ==
=== The Mingus Big Band ===
Charles Mingus's music is currently being performed and reinterpreted by the Mingus Big Band, which in October 2008 began playing every Monday at Jazz Standard in New York City, and often tours the rest of the U.S. and Europe. The Mingus Big Band, the Mingus Orchestra, and the Mingus Dynasty band were managed by Jazz Workshop, Inc. and run by Mingus's widow, Sue Graham Mingus.

Elvis Costello has written lyrics for a few Mingus pieces. He had once sung lyrics for one piece, "Invisible Lady", backed by the Mingus Big Band on the album, Tonight at Noon: Three of Four Shades of Love.

=== Epitaph ===
Epitaph is considered one of Charles Mingus's masterpieces. The composition is 4,235 measures long, requires two hours to perform, and is one of the longest jazz pieces ever written. Epitaph was only completely discovered by musicologist Andrew Homzy during the cataloging process after Mingus's death. With the help of a grant from the Ford Foundation, the score and instrumental parts were copied, and the piece itself was premiered by a 30-piece orchestra, conducted by Gunther Schuller. This concert was produced by Mingus's widow, Sue Graham Mingus, at Alice Tully Hall on 3 June 1989, 10 years after Mingus's death. It was performed again at several concerts in 2007. The performance at Walt Disney Concert Hall is available on NPR. Hal Leonard published the complete score in 2008.

=== Autobiography ===
Mingus wrote the sprawling, exaggerated, quasi-autobiography, Beneath the Underdog: His World as Composed by Mingus, throughout the 1960s, and it was published in 1971. Its "stream of consciousness" style covered several aspects of his life that had previously been off-record. In addition to his musical and intellectual proliferation, Mingus goes into great detail about his perhaps overstated sexual exploits. He claims to have had more than 31 affairs in the course of his life (including 26 prostitutes in one sitting). This does not include any of his five wives (he claims to have been married to two of them simultaneously). In addition, he asserts that he held a brief career as a pimp. This has never been confirmed.

Mingus's autobiography also serves as an insight into his psyche, as well as his attitudes about race and society. It includes accounts of abuse at the hands of his father from an early age, being bullied as a child, his removal from a white musician's union, and grappling with disapproval while married to white women and other examples of hardship and prejudice.

=== Scholarly influence ===
The work of Charles Mingus has also received attention in academia. The American scholar of religion and multidisciplinary artist Ashon Crawley writes in his book Blackpentecostal Breath: The Aesthetics of Possibility that Mingus's musicianship is an example of the power of music to blur the boundaries between the sacred and the profane. Discussing the song "Wednesday Night Prayer Meeting", which Mingus was inspired to write by attending a Holiness Pentecostal church in Los Angeles, Crawley suggests that Mingus found the gatherings to be an "ongoing, deep, intense mode of study, a kind of study wherein the aesthetic forms created could not be severed from the intellectual practice because they were one and also, but not, the same", and sought to express this through his compositions.

Gunther Schuller has suggested that Mingus should be ranked among the most important American composers, jazz or otherwise. In 1988, a grant from the National Endowment for the Arts made possible the cataloging of Mingus compositions, which were then donated to the Music Division of the New York Public Library for public use. In 1993, The Library of Congress acquired Mingus's collected papers—including scores, sound recordings, correspondence and photos—in what they described as "the most important acquisition of a manuscript collection relating to jazz in the Library's history".

=== Cover versions ===
Considering the number of compositions that Charles Mingus wrote, his works have not been recorded as often as comparable jazz composers. The only Mingus tribute albums recorded during his lifetime were baritone saxophonist Pepper Adams's album, Pepper Adams Plays the Compositions of Charlie Mingus, in 1963, and Joni Mitchell's album Mingus, in 1979. Of all his works, his elegy for Lester Young, "Goodbye Pork Pie Hat" (from Mingus Ah Um) been recorded numerous times. The song has been covered by both jazz and non-jazz artists, such as Jeff Beck, Andy Summers, Eugene Chadbourne, and Bert Jansch and John Renbourn with and without Pentangle. Joni Mitchell sang a version with lyrics that she wrote for it.

Elvis Costello has recorded "Hora Decubitus" (from Mingus Mingus Mingus Mingus Mingus) on My Flame Burns Blue (2006). "Better Git It in Your Soul" was covered by Davey Graham on his album Folk, Blues, and Beyond. Trumpeter Ron Miles performs a version of "Pithecanthropus Erectus" on his CD Witness. The New York Ska Jazz Ensemble has done a cover of Mingus's "Haitian Fight Song", as have the British folk rock group Pentangle and others. Hal Willner's 1992 tribute album Weird Nightmare: Meditations on Mingus (Columbia Records) contains idiosyncratic renditions of Mingus's works involving numerous popular musicians including Chuck D, Keith Richards, Henry Rollins and Dr. John. The Italian band Quintorigo recorded an entire album devoted to Mingus's music, titled Play Mingus.

Gunther Schuller's edition of Mingus's Epitaph, which premiered at Lincoln Center in 1989, was subsequently released on Columbia/Sony Records.

One of the most elaborate tributes to Mingus came on September 29, 1969, at a festival honoring him. Duke Ellington performed The Clown, with Ellington reading Jean Shepherd's narration. It was long believed that no recording of this performance existed; however, one was discovered and premiered on July 11, 2013, by Dry River Jazz host Trevor Hodgkins for NPR member station KRWG-FM with re-airings on July 13, 2013, and July 26, 2014. Mingus's elegy for Ellington, "Duke Ellington's Sound Of Love", was recorded by Kevin Mahogany on Double Rainbow (1993) and Anita Wardell on Why Do You Cry? (1995).

== Awards and honors ==
- 1971: Guggenheim Fellowship (Music Composition). Inducted in the DownBeat Jazz Hall of Fame. Awarded Slee Chair of Music at University of New York Buffalo.
- 1988: The National Endowment for the Arts provided grants for a Mingus nonprofit called "Let My Children Hear Music" which cataloged all of Mingus's works. The microfilms of these works were given to the Music Division of the New York Public Library where they are currently available for study.
- 1993: The Library of Congress acquired Mingus's collected papers—including scores, sound recordings, correspondence and photos—in what they described as "the most important acquisition of a manuscript collection relating to jazz in the Library's history".
- 1995: The United States Postal Service issued a stamp in his honor.
- 1997: Posthumously awarded the Grammy Lifetime Achievement Award.
- 1999: Album Mingus Dynasty (1959) inducted in the Grammy Hall of Fame.
- 2005: Inducted in the Jazz at Lincoln Center, Nesuhi Ertegun Jazz Hall of Fame.
- 2013: Album Mingus Ah Um (1959) inducted in the Grammy Hall of Fame.

== Discography ==
- Strings and Keys (1953)
- Miss Bliss (1953)
- Jazzical Moods, Volume 1 (1955)
- Jazzical Moods, Volume 2 (1955)
- Jazz Composers Workshop (1956)
- Pithecanthropus Erectus (1956)
- The Clown (1957)
- Mingus Three (1957)
- East Coasting (1957)
- A Modern Jazz Symposium of Music and Poetry (1959)
- Mingus Ah Um (1959)
- Blues & Roots (1960)
- Mingus Dynasty (1960)
- Charles Mingus Presents Charles Mingus (1961)
- Pre-Bird (1961)
- Newport Rebels (1961)
- Mingus (1961)
- Tijuana Moods (1962)
- Oh Yeah (1962)
- The Black Saint and the Sinner Lady (1963)
- Tonight at Noon (1964)
- Mingus Plays Piano (1964)
- Mingus Mingus Mingus Mingus Mingus (1964)
- Blue Bird (1971)
- Pithycanthropus Erectus (1971)
- Charles Mingus with Orchestra (1971)
- Let My Children Hear Music (1972)
- Mingus Moves (1974)
- Changes One (1975)
- Changes Two (1975)
- Three or Four Shades of Blues (1977)
- Lionel Hampton Presents Charles Mingus (1977)
- Cumbia & Jazz Fusion (1978)
- Reincarnation Of A Love Bird (1988)
- Mysterious Blues (1990)
- Shadows (2016)

== Filmography ==
- 1959, Mingus contributed most of the music for John Cassavetes's New York City film Shadows.
- 1961, Mingus appeared as a bassist and actor in the British film All Night Long.
- 1968, Thomas Reichman directed the documentary Mingus: Charlie Mingus 1968.
- 1991, Ray Davies produced a documentary entitled Weird Nightmare. It contains footage of Mingus and interviews with artists making Hal Willner's tribute album of the same name, including Elvis Costello, Charlie Watts, Keith Richards, and Vernon Reid.
- 1998, Charles Mingus: Triumph of the Underdog (78 minutes) a documentary film on Charles Mingus directed by Don McGlynn.
