= Coltrane for Lovers =

Compilation album by John Coltrane
- Released: January 23, 2001
- Recorded: 1961–63
- Studio: Van Gelder (Englewood Cliffs)
- Genre: Romantic jazz; hard bop
- Length: 50:53
- Label: Impulse!; Verve
- Producer: Bob Thiele; Rudy Van Gelder; Richard Seidel

John Coltrane chronology
Ken Burns Jazz (2000)	Coltrane for Lovers (2001)	The Very Best of John Coltrane (2001)

Coltrane for Lovers is a compilation album of recordings by American jazz saxophonist-composer John Coltrane, released posthumously on January 23, 2001, by Impulse! and Verve Records. The 11 tracks compiled for the album are all romantic ballads from Coltrane's early years with Impulse!, being recorded during December 1961 to April 1963 at engineer Rudy Van Gelder's recording studio in Englewood Cliffs, New Jersey. Dominated by Coltrane's classic quartet, the sessions also included collaborations with vocalist Johnny Hartman and pianist Duke Ellington.

The recordings on Coltrane for Lovers initially received criticism for Coltrane's stylistic move from complex jazz compositions of the free jazz form to a simpler formula of ballads and blues. In the years since, they gained a legacy as one of Coltrane's most popular recordings and significant in the romantic jazz mode. For their inclusion on Coltrane for Lovers, the tracks were selected by producer Richard Seidel and remastering engineer Allan Tucker at Foothill Digital in New York City.

As the first release in the Verve for Lovers series, Coltrane for Lovers was issued 33 years after Coltrane's death and nearly 40 years after the original recording dates. The album charted at number 10 on Billboard magazine's Top Jazz Albums and was received positively by reviewers, who generally confirmed the popularity and aesthetic value of the recordings.

== Background ==
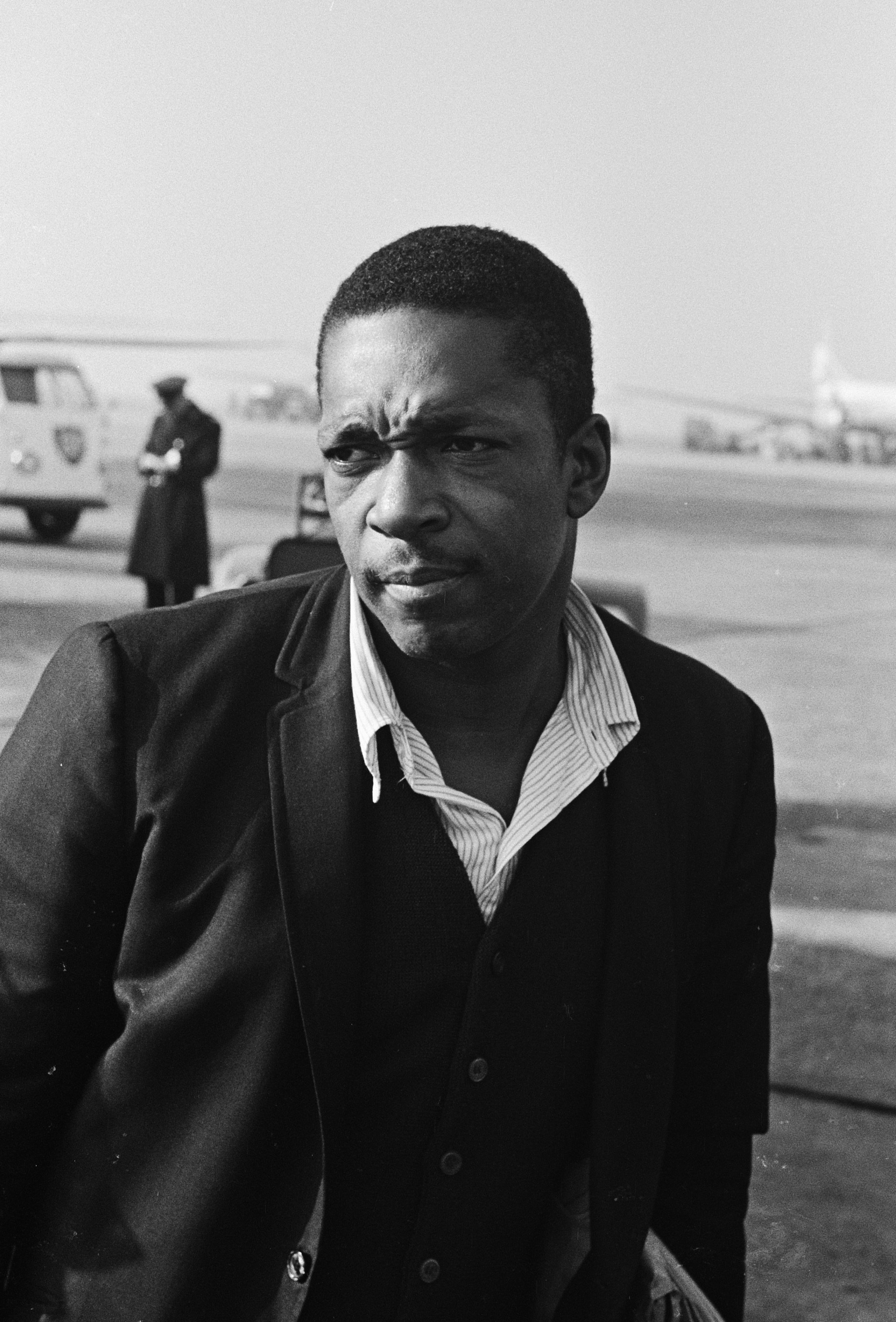
Coltrane in 1963

Shortly before completing his contract with Atlantic in May 1961, John Coltrane joined the newly formed Impulse! label, with whom the "Classic Quartet" would record. It is generally assumed that the clinching reason Coltrane signed with Impulse! was that it would enable him to work again with recording engineer Rudy Van Gelder, who had taped his Prestige sessions, as well as Blue Train. It was at Van Gelder's new studio in Englewood Cliffs, New Jersey that Coltrane would record most of his records for the label.

During this period of Coltrane's recording career, critics and fans were fiercely divided in their estimation of Coltrane, who had radically altered his style from bebop to the modal and free jazz styles, as featured on Coltrane (1962), his first studio project for the Impulse! label. John Tynan of Down Beat magazine went so far as to call his playing "anti-jazz." In the midst of this controversy, Coltrane decided to release his next three albums in order to improve the critical perception of himself. In an interview with music journalist Gene Lees, Coltrane was asked of his musical and stylistic change from modal and free jazz to more simplistic forms and standards. He responded by stating "Variety".

John Coltrane's primary record producer, Bob Thiele, who had worked with Coltrane on his previous albums Live! at the Village Vanguard (1961) and Coltrane (1962), acknowledged that the next three Coltrane albums to be released were to be recorded at his behest and as ballad-themed to quiet the negative criticism of Coltrane's more diverse playing. The material chosen for Coltrane's next records would be suited for more slow-tempo, smooth and romantic playing, in contrast to Coltrane's forceful, aggressive style that had dominated his previously issued recordings, and which had led to reviewers describing his playing as "angry".

== Recordings and composition ==
"My One and Only Love"
John Coltrane performs tenor saxophone on the romantic ballad, which features jazz vocalist Johnny Hartman.

The recordings featured on Coltrane for Lovers were made between December 1961 and April 1963, during his early years with Impulse! Records. As Thiele intended, these next of Coltrane's releases featured the hard bop form of playing, incorporating influences from rhythm and blues, gospel music, and the blues, especially with the saxophone and piano, and straight-ahead ballads and standards. Ballads, recorded in late 1961 and 1962, was at first criticized as predictable and too simple after the aggressiveness Coltrane displayed on his previous recordings, but was later reevaluated favorably, by some as a masterpiece. On Duke Ellington and John Coltrane, Ellington "sat in" with the John Coltrane Quartet for a set dominated by the pianist's songs. Some performances had Ellington's usual sidemen, bassist Aaron Bell and drummer Sam Woodyard, replacing Jimmy Garrison and Elvin Jones in Coltrane's group.

Recording for the collaboration LP John Coltrane and Johnny Hartman (1963) found the "classic quartet" backing up singer Hartman on ballad standards. Rolling Stone magazine later described the album as "...one of Coltrane's least innovative records, but impeccably dignified and elegant", and music critic Richard S. Ginell commented by saying that "Coltrane's eloquence and the warm, masculine baritone of Hartman can still break your heart." Renowned writer and poet Al Young wrote of the album's most well-known recording, "My One and Only Love", and interpretation of the song by Coltrane and Hartman:

Without using words, great jazz interpreters make you feel the emotions that linger in the words and quiver between the words to the songs they perform. If, for example, you know the lyric to Robert Mellin and Guy Wood's "My One and Only Love", you dissolve at once into the undulant sea of John Coltrane's poetic paraphrase of that unremitting declaration of love... With the husky yet tender voice of Trane's tenor saxophone backing you, the very thought of you lover makes your heart sing like that April breeze on the wings of spring. You have no trouble picturing the splendor of it; the shadows that fall in the hush of night; and arms, those knowing arms and lips so tender, so warm that the heavenly touching of hands can only lead to sweet surrender.

Shortly after the release of his ballad-oriented albums, Coltrane returned to a more experimental phase, recording Impressions (1963) and A Love Supreme (1965). In spite of this, the previous serious of ballad-oriented recordings served in helping increase Coltrane's legacy and influence on romantic jazz.

== Compilation and release ==
Logo of Verve Music Group, the album's issuer

Coltrane for Lovers compiled eleven of the recordings from the aforementioned period seen best fit by the compilation's producers for a romance-themed compilation. The album was released in the United States by the Verve Music Group on January 23, 2001. Thirty three years after Coltrane's death and nearly 40 years after the original recording dates, the album entered the Top Jazz Albums chart and peaked at number 10 on March 3, 2001. It remained on the chart for 63 weeks.

The album served as the first of several other For Lovers compilations that the Verve label would later issue, including recordings by Sarah Vaughan, Chet Baker, and Charlie Parker. A similar compilation, entitled Plays for Lovers, was released by Prestige in 2003. Another Verve compilation of Coltrane ballads, entitled More Coltrane for Lovers, followed in 2005.

== Critical reception ==
In a four-star review, Allmusic editor Alex Henderson called Coltrane for Lovers "an excellent collection that has no problem reminding us just how warm and expressive his ballad playing could be." After discussing how Coltrane's ballad-playing has been undervalued in comparison to his more experimental recordings, in a December 21, 2001 article for The New York Times, writer Ben Ratliff wrote that "This collection ... presents all the argument you need." Some, however, have criticized the album and Verve negatively for repackaging Coltrane material for an unnecessary cash-in compilation. In The Penguin Guide to Jazz on CD, Richard Cook and Brian Morton gave the album one out of four stars and commented, "Oh, for goodness' sake! We're tempted to tell you that this contains a previously unreleased rehearsal of Ascension, which we have long regarded as excellent make-out music, but it does not. Needless to say, the music is fine ... It's the concept we have problems with. Avoid."

The recordings compiled for Coltrane for Lovers have endured a legacy as one of Coltrane's best performing and interpreting of ballads and standards. In a September 2000 essay on the recordings, writer Al Young elaborated on John Coltrane's ability during the period of recording the compiled jazz ballads, writing that "The rapport between performer and audience smooths and deepens when a player of John Coltrane's caliber breathes personal expression into some aspect of a song's lyric or meaning." Young continued in his review of the album, stating:

Jazz soloists are always expected to meet listener expectations. "You tell your story" is how twentieth-century soloists described the way they had their way with a song, as it were. They interpret, they embellish, and they set or induce a mood. Not only are musicians expected to coax personal meaning from songs ... we generally expect them to know the lyrics ... For Coltrane, blues and ballads were anything but separate; each told a story. And he was a superb teller of love stories. Listen to the glistening tenderness of his delivery ... Coltrane for Lovers contains some of the most romantic and popular music ever recorded. Revered by musicians, critics, and music fans alike, John Coltrane set the standard for ballads.

In a 2007 interview for Esquire magazine, author and Coltrane biographer Ben Ratliff praised Coltrane's music and balladry, stating "His work contains most of the well-known ideals of jazz... If you're interested in improvisation, this guy pushed improvisation to the wall. He was the best blues player of his time. He wrote and played incredible ballads. Record companies are still putting out compilations of Coltrane ballads called Coltrane for Lovers or whatever. You can poke fun at the idea, but if you ever listen to one, they're indescribably beautiful."

== Track listing ==
No.	Title	Writer(s)	Recorded	Length
1.	"My One and Only Love"	Guy Wood, Robert Mellin	3/07/63 ^{d}	4:57
2.	"Too Young to Go Steady"	Harold Adamson, Jimmy McHugh	9/13/62 ^{c}	4:24
3.	"In a Sentimental Mood"	Duke Ellington	9/26/62 ^{b}	4:18
4.	"It's Easy to Remember"	Richard Rogers, Lorenz Hart	12/21/61 ^{c}	2:50
5.	"Dedicated to You"	Sammy Cahn, Saul Chaplin, Hy Zaret	3/07/63 ^{d}	5:32
6.	"You Don't Know What Love Is"	Gene DePaul, Don Raye	9/13/62 ^{c}	5:16
7.	"After the Rain"	John Coltrane	4/29/63 ^{e}	4:13
8.	"My Little Brown Book"	Billy Strayhorn	9/26/62 ^{b}	5:26
9.	"Soul Eyes"	Mal Waldron	6/19/62 ^{a}	5:26
10.	"They Say It's Wonderful"	Irving Berlin	3/07/63 ^{d}	5:22
11.	"Nancy (With the Laughing Face)"	Jimmy Van Heusen, Phil Silvers	9/18/62 ^{c}	3:17

Track sources

- ^{a} originally from Coltrane (1962)
- ^{b} originally from Duke Ellington and John Coltrane (1962)
- ^{c} originally from Ballads (1962)
- ^{d} originally from John Coltrane and Johnny Hartman (1963)
- ^{e} originally from Impressions (1963)

== Charts ==
Billboard Music Charts (North America) – Coltrane for Lovers

- 2001: Top Jazz Albums – #10 (63 weeks)

== Personnel ==
=== Musicians ===
- John Coltrane – tenor saxophone
- Aaron Bell – double bass (tracks: 3, 8)
- Duke Ellington – piano (tracks: 3, 8)
- Jimmy Garrison – double bass (tracks: 1, 2, 5–7, 9–11)
- Johnny Hartman – vocals (tracks: 1, 5, 10)
- Roy Haynes – drums (tracks: 7)
- Elvin Jones – drums (tracks: 1–6, 9–11)
- McCoy Tyner – piano (tracks: 1, 2, 4–7, 9–11)
- Reggie Workman – double bass (tracks: 4)
- Sam Woodyard – drums (tracks: 8)

=== Production ===
- Pamala Cestero – research
- GrowingStudio, Bklyn – design
- Amelie Hazard – illustrations, cover art
- Carlos Kase – research coordination
- Peter Keepnews – note editing
- Hollis King – art direction
- Bryan Koniarz – production coordination
- Renee Rosnes – sequencing
- Richard Seidel – compilation production
- Sherniece Smith – art production
- Chuck Stewart – photography
- Bob Thiele – original production
- Allan Tucker – remastering
- Rudy Van Gelder – original engineering
- Al Young – liner notes

== Bibliography ==
- Al Young (2001). Coltrane for Lovers album liner notes. The Verve Music Group, a Division of UMG Recordings, Inc.
- Porter, Lewis (1999). John Coltrane: His Life and Music. University of Michigan Press. ISBN 0-472-08643-X.
- Nathan Brackett, Christian Hoard (2004). The New Rolling Stone Album Guide. excerpt by Douglas Wolk. Simon and Schuster. ISBN 0-7432-0169-8.
- Richard Cook, Brian Morton (2002). The Penguin Guide to Jazz on CD. Edition 6. Penguin. ISBN 0-14-051521-6.
