= Unforgettable Songs by Johnny Hartman =

Studio album by Johnny Hartman
- Released: September 1966
- Recorded: February 15, 17–18, 1966
- Venue: Los Angeles
- Studio: United Recorders
- Genre: Jazz
- Length: 30:05
- Label: ABC-Paramount
- Producer: Bob Thiele

Johnny Hartman chronology
The Voice That Is! (1965)	Unforgettable Songs by Johnny Hartman (1966)	I Love Everybody (1967)

Professional ratings
Review scores
Source	Rating
AllMusic	4/5 stars
The Rolling Stone Jazz & Blues Album Guide	3.5/5 stars
DownBeat	4/5 stars
The Penguin Guide to Jazz	3/4 stars

Unforgettable Songs by Johnny Hartman is a studio album by American jazz vocalist Johnny Hartman, released in 1966 by ABC-Paramount Records. Gerald Wilson served as the arranger and conductor, and the album was produced by Bob Thiele.

The album was Hartman's first on ABC-Paramount, parent company of jazz subsidiary Impulse!, where he had recorded his three previous albums. The move was intended to bring the singer to a larger audience. According to Hartman's biographer, Gregg Akkerman, producer Bob Thiele "was trying his hardest to present a Tony Bennett-style pop album." ABC-Paramount offered little promotional support, however, and neither the album, nor its single ("The Very Thought of You") made it onto popular music charts.

In 1995, Impulse! released a compact disc version of the album, entitled Unforgettable, that also included Side 2 of I Love Everybody (1967), Hartman's other LP with ABC-Paramount.

== Reception ==
Jason Ankeny at AllMusic calls the album "delightful," saying it "captures Hartman at his most effervescent, teaming with arranger Gerald Wilson to create a set of buoyant, swing-era standards crafted with impeccable style and sophistication."

Author and music critic Will Friedwald said Thiele's decision to have Hartman record more pop-oriented work was "an inspired idea" and the album was "classic Hartman all the way through." He contrasts the work with the more well-known John Coltrane and Johnny Hartman, noting that "Unforgettable, ostensibly a pop outing, has him conforming even more to the archetype of a 'jazz singer' than he does on the Coltrane album."

Reviewing the album upon its initial release, Gene Lees at Stereo Review called Hartman "a very good singer – rich-toned, warm, and musical" but criticized Wilson's string arrangements. "When he's working with brass, saxes, and rhythm, an idiom with which he has long been comfortable, he's first-rate. But when he's using strings and rhythm, he's not quite as good. I get the feeling he hasn't been given sufficient chance to work with strings. And the string players here are bad. Fortunately, most tracks are with the band."

In another contemporary review, DownBeat said, "This is the timeless artistry of a great voice.... The band, under Wilson's hand, is a clean, precision instrument deftly handled with feeling. Not one instrument is wasted or one passage carelessly executed." The reviewer also stated that "Hartman has rarely sounded better and ... is more flexible than he has been in years.... There have been better records of Hartman singing, but this is one of his best complete works."

== Track listing ==
=== Side 1 ===
1. "The Very Thought of You" (Ray Noble) – 2:48
2. "Fools Rush In" (Johnny Mercer, Rube Bloom) – 2:46
3. "Love Is Here to Stay" (George Gershwin, Ira Gershwin) – 2:17
4. "Once in a While" (Michael Edwards, Bud Green) – 2:29
5. "Bidin' My Time" (Gershwin, Gershwin) – 2:07
6. "Down in the Depths" (Cole Porter) – 2:49

=== Side 2 ===
1. "Ain't Misbehavin'" (Fats Waller, Harry Brooks, Andy Razaf) – 2:33
2. "Isn't It Romantic?" (Richard Rodgers, Lorenz Hart) – 2:05
3. "Unforgettable" (Irving Gordon) – 2:40
4. "The More I See You" (Harry Warren, Mack Gordon) – 2:25
5. "What Do I Owe Her?" (Fred E. Ahlert, Benny Goodman) – 3:15
6. "Almost Like Being in Love" (Alan Jay Lerner, Frederick Loewe) – 2:38

== Personnel ==
- Johnny Hartman – vocals
- Harold Land – tenor saxophone
- Teddy Edwards – tenor saxophone
- Curtis Amy – tenor saxophone
- Anthony Ortega – saxophone
- Jack Nimitz – baritone saxophone
- Al Porcino – trumpet
- Bud Brisbois – trumpet
- Jules Chaikin – trumpet
- Frederick Hill – trumpet
- Melvin Moore – trumpet
- John Ewing – trombone
- Michael Barone – trombone
- Lester Robertson – trombone
- Ernie Tack – trombone
- Mike Melvoin – piano
- Herb Ellis – guitar (A3-A4, B2, B6)
- Dennis Budimir – guitar
- John Gray – guitar
- Ray Brown – bass (A5-A6, B4-B5)
- Jimmy Bond Jr. – bass
- Stan Levey – drums
- Gerald Wilson – arranger, conductor
