= This One's for Tedi =

Studio album by Johnny Hartman
- Released: 1985
- Recorded: August 23, 1980
- Venue: Hamilton, Ontario
- Studio: Grant Avenue Studios
- Genre: Vocal jazz
- Length: 36:30
- Label: Audiophile
- Producer: George H. Buck Jr.

Johnny Hartman chronology
Once in Every Life (1980)	This One's for Tedi (1985)	For Trane (1995)

Professional ratings
Review scores
Source	Rating
AllMusic	2.5/5 stars
The Penguin Guide to Jazz	3/4 stars
The Rolling Stone Jazz & Blues Album Guide	3/5 stars
The Virgin Encyclopedia of Jazz	3/5 stars

This One's for Tedi is a studio album by American jazz vocalist Johnny Hartman, released in 1985 by Audiophile Records. It was his final studio recording, made in August 1980, three years before his death. The album is dedicated to Hartman's wife Theodora (Tedi). According to producer George H. Buck Jr., This One's for Tedi "was the first digital recording to be made in Canada."

== Reception ==
Reception for This One's for Tedi has been mostly favorable.

The album "finds the 56-year-old singer still in prime form," writes Scott Yanow at AllMusic. "Hartman is as warm as usual on ballads, and also swings lightly on a few medium-tempo pieces."

Andrew Sussman, critic at Fanfare, called the album "the most satisfying I have heard from him since his landmark LP with John Coltrane. . . . If Mel Torme is the 'Velvet Fog,' then Johnny Hartman was surely pure silk, singing most often through the rain of human tears." Sussman also complimented the musicians, saying "there are no overwhelming jazz soloists here; just a superbly tasteful and sensitive group led by pianist Tony Monte." He praised Hartman's "luxurious baritone voice" on several songs and concludes by saying, "There is even a haunting fresh rendition of 'Send In the Clowns' with a truly singular piano accompaniment by Monte."

Show Music magazine praised the collection of "ten excellent tracks by the ex-Dizzy Gillespie vocalist. Mr. Hartman's rich voice caresses "That's All," "More I Cannot Wish You" ... among other tracks on the album, and more than 'hearing' these songs, you experience them." They also hailed Monte's "sensitive piano accompaniment," Lorne Lofsky's guitar playing, and the "perceptive [liner] notes by Nick Catalano."

Will Friedwald, writing in A Biographical Guide to the Great Jazz and Pop Singers, called This One's for Tedi "a fittingly sentimental dedication to his wife, who at the time of the singer's death in 1983, had been married to him for twenty-six years."

== Track listing ==
=== Side 1 ===
1. "That's All" (Bob Haymes, Alan Brandt) – 4:59
2. "They Can't Take That Away from Me" (George Gershwin, Ira Gershwin) – 3:19
3. "More I Cannot Wish You" (Frank Loesser) – 3:20
4. "Wait till You See Her" (Richard Rodgers, Lorenz Hart) – 2:07
5. "Miss Otis Regrets" (Cole Porter) - 3:51

=== Side 2 ===
1. "Then I'll Be Tired Of You" (Yip Harburg, Arthur Schwartz) – 3:36
2. "It Could Happen to You" (Jimmy Van Heusen, Johnny Burke) – 2:05
3. "Send In the Clowns" (Stephen Sondheim) – 4:26
4. "You Stepped Out of a Dream" (Nacio Herb Brown, Gus Kahn) – 2:29
5. "The Ballad of the Sad Young Men" (Fran Landesman, Tommy Wolf) – 5:28

Recorded August 23, 1980, Grant Avenue Studios, Hamilton, Ontario, Canada.

== Personnel ==
- Johnny Hartman - vocals
- Lorne Lofsky - guitar
- Tony Monte - piano, arranger
- Chris Conner - bass
- Craig "Buff" Allen - drums
- George H. Buck Jr. - producer
- Bill Garrett - co-producer
- David Dobbs - co-producer, engineer
- Nick Catalano - liner notes
