= I See Your Face Before Me =

I See Your Face Before Me is a popular song composed by Arthur Schwartz, with lyrics by Howard Dietz. It was introduced by Evelyn Laye and Adele Dixon in the 1937 Broadway musical Between the Devil. Two recordings of the song made the charts shortly after the show's debut: Guy Lombardo & His Royal Canadians reached number 12, and Glen Gray & The Casa Loma Orchestra made it to number 13.

Johnny Hartman's 1980 recording was part of the soundtrack for the 1995 film, The Bridges of Madison County. Hartman's recording accompanies a key scene where the characters Robert and Francesca dance and kiss for the first time. The song was also the first composition that Nelson Riddle wrote an arrangement for, in 1938. Riddle would later arrange "I See Your Face Before Me" for Frank Sinatra's 1955 album, In the Wee Small Hours.

== Other notable recordings ==
- Mildred Bailey - recorded January 10, 1938 for Vocalion Records (catalog No.3931).
- Mary Martin - included in the album Mary Martin – Sings for You (1949).
- Bing Crosby recorded the song on his Kraft Music Hall show on February 3, 1938. In 1955, he recorded it again for use on his radio show and it was subsequently included in the box set The Bing Crosby CBS Radio Recordings (1954-56) issued by Mosaic Records (catalog MD7-245) in 2009.
- Frank Sinatra - In the Wee Small Hours (1955)
- Miles Davis - The Musings of Miles (1955)
- Nat King Cole (piano only) - in the album The Piano Style of Nat King Cole (1956)
- Johnny Hartman - Songs from the Heart (1955), Once in Every Life (1980)
- Dave Brubeck - Plays and Plays and... (1957)
- Doris Day - in her album Day by Night (1957)
- John Coltrane - Settin' the Pace (1958)
- Carmen McRae - for her album Something to Swing About (1959)
- Andy Williams - included in his album Warm and Willing (1962)
- Jack Jones in his album Wives and Lovers (1963).
- Anthony Newley - for his album In My Solitude (1964).
- Jo Stafford - included in her album Do I Hear a Waltz? (1965)
- Hank Mobley - in his Blue Note Records album Dippin' (1966)
- Peggy Lee - for her album Bridge Over Troubled Water (1970)
- Tony Bennett - included in his album Perfectly Frank (1992)
- Mark Murphy with the Metropole Orchestra - The Dream (1995)
- Michael Feinstein - for his album Such Sweet Sorrow (1995).
- Jennifer Warnes - for her album, Another Time, Another Place (2019)
