= For Trane =

Compilation album by Johnny Hartman
- Released: 1995
- Recorded: November 25 & 29 and December 1, 1972
- Venue: Tokyo
- Studios: Shiba East Studio (Nov 25), EMI Studio 1 (Nov 29), Mouri Studio (Dec 1)
- Genre: Jazz
- Length: 54:31
- Label: Blue Note
- Producer: Michael Cuscuna

Johnny Hartman chronology
This One's for Tedi (1985)	For Trane (1995)	Thank You for Everything (1998)

Hartman Meets Hino (1972)

Hartman Sings Trane's Favorites (1973)

Professional ratings
Review scores
Source	Rating
AllMusic	2.5/5 stars
The Penguin Guide to Jazz	3/4 stars
The Rolling Stone Jazz & Blues Album Guide	3/5 stars

For Trane is a compilation album by American jazz vocalist Johnny Hartman that was released in 1995 by Blue Note Records. It contains material from two albums that Hartman recorded in Tokyo in 1972, Hartman Meets Hino and Hartman Sings Trane's Favorites. The original LPs were only available in Japan. For Trane marks the first time the songs have been released in the United States.

== Background ==
In 1995, the commercial success of the soundtrack to The Bridges of Madison County, which featured four songs by Johnny Hartman, led to a resurgence of interest in the vocalist's work. Eleven reissues and compilations were released by various record companies between 1995 and 1998, including For Trane, from Blue Note, which contained material from two albums that Hartman had recorded for Capitol Music (Japan) in 1972 but had never been available stateside.

Hartman had toured Japan with Art Blakey in 1963, and his participation in the John Coltrane and Johnny Hartman album "had given Hartman considerable credibility with the Japanese, so an invitation was extended and accepted." In late November 1972, he gave concerts with Japan's most popular jazz group, the Sharps and Flats big band, and with the Terumasa Hino quartet. He also participated in three recording sessions with Japanese musicians.

Hartman's biographer, Gregg Akkerman, has written, "What a pity that Hartman fans had to wait over twenty years before these well-chosen, well performed, and well-recorded songs found any exposure in America. Only with Hartman's posthumous popularity did Blue Note release an assortment of the Japanese recordings. . . . Had these persuasive recordings been available in the United States during the 1970s, they might very well have reignited Hartman's reputation as a jazz vocalist."

== Recording ==
On November 25, 1972, Hartman recorded five tunes with a Japanese trio, including three that would eventually appear on For Trane. According to Akkerman, Hartman had to rehearse each song several times with the group. "The quality of music captured that day was impressive, but the time expended rehearsing explains why they only completed five songs instead of enough tracks for a complete album."

That evening, Hartman performed live with the Hino quartet, which served as a rehearsal for a studio session with the group four days later. On November 29, they recorded all eight songs for a Capitol (Japan) album entitled Hartman Meets Hino that was released in December 1972. Six of these tunes are included on the For Trane compilation.

Finally, two days later, Hartman recorded a pair of songs with the Hino rhythm section that would be used to fill out a second Capitol (Japan) album entitled Hartman Sings Trane's Favorites, released in early 1973. Both of the tracks recorded that day are available on For Trane.

== Reception ==
For Trane has received a mostly positive reception.

Scott Yanow at AllMusic wrote, "The music alternates between ballads ('Violets for Your Furs' and 'The Nearness of You' are high points) and swingers and, although Hartman does not really improvise, his voice (still in its prime at the time) is appealing."

Musician magazine's critic Andrew Gilbert said, "With his deep, rich baritone and relaxed delivery, Johnny Hartman was one of jazz's great ballad singers." Gilbert lamented the lack of reissues after Hartman's death in 1983 and called For Trane an "especially welcome" release. "With his voice in fine form ... Hartman endows standards such as 'Nature Boy,' 'The Nearness of You' and 'Sposin' with almost tangible longing and smoldering sensuality."

The Skanner's Dick Bogle chose For Trane as one of "Dick's Picks," saying it "combines beautiful ballads with some uptempo selections for 11 tracks of pure Hartman. The two banner tracks are 'The Nearness of You' and 'My Funny Valentine.'" Bogle added, "Hartman isn't the only star. Trumpeter Terumaso Hino and pianist Masahiko Kikuchi fit right in the groove."

The Richmond Times-Dispatch wrote, "There isn't a richer baritone singer, or one who can turn a phrase with the husky sibilance of a reed any better than the late Johnny Hartman. . . . Backed by fine instrumentalists from the Toshiba-EMI label, Hartman extends the sentiment of past great recordings with exquisite covers."

The Omaha World-Herald called the work on the album "uneven," but with Hartman's "charming, resonant voice mostly in control."

Reviewing a 2005 reissue of the material, Ong Sor Fern at The Straits Times (Singapore) awarded the album 4.5 out of five stars, claiming that "Johnny Hartman was, arguably, the best male jazz vocalist ever. . . . The small combo setting sets off his satiny baritone to perfection. The standouts: A lazy version of Summertime where his deliberate phrasing and great breath control take centrestage; A conversational take on Why Did I Choose You?; and an unusually perky version of the unjustly neglected ballad 'S'posin'."

== Reissues ==
All of the tracks on For Trane, along with the rest of the songs that Hartman recorded for Hartman Meets Hino and Hartman Sings Trane's Favorites, are included on the 2005 compact disc The Tokyo Albums, released by Gambit Records.

== Track listing ==
1. My Favorite Things (Richard Rodgers, Oscar Hammerstein II) – 4:13
2. Violets for Your Furs (Matt Dennis, Tom Adair) – 5:00
3. Nature Boy (eden ahbez) – 3:29
4. Summertime (George Gershwin, Ira Gershwin, DuBose Heyward) – 7:08
5. Why Did I Choose You (Herbert Martin, Michael Leonard) – 3:27
6. The Nearness of You (Hoagy Carmichael, Ned Washington) – 6:56
7. I'm Glad There Is You (Jimmy Dorsey, Paul Madeira) – 4:10
8. On Green Dolphin Street (Bronislaw Kaper, Washington) – 3:19
9. My Funny Valentine (Rodgers, Lorenz Hart) – 7:31
10. Sometimes I'm Happy (Vincent Youmans, Irving Caesar) – 4:02
11. S'posin (Andy Razaf, Paul Denniker) – 5:16

Recorded in Tokyo on November 25 (tracks 1–3), November 29 (tracks 6–11), and December 1, 1972 (tracks 4–5).

== Personnel ==
- Johnny Hartman – vocals
- Terumasa Hino – trumpet (tracks 6–11)
- Mikio Masuda – piano (tracks 4–11)
- Masabumi Kikuchi – piano (tracks 1–3)
- Yoshio Ikeda – bass (tracks 4–11)
- Yoshio Suzuki – bass (tracks 1–3)
- Motohiko Hino – drums (tracks 4–11)
- Hiroshi Murakami – drums (tracks 1–3)
