= To Each His Own (Jay Livingston and Ray Evans song) =

1946 song by Jay Livingston and Ray Evans

Single by Eddy Howard and His Orchestra
- B-side: "Cynthia's In Love"
- Published: February 28, 1946 by Paramount Music Corporation
- Released: June 1946
- Recorded: April 16, 1946
- Genre: Popular music, Pop standard
- Length: 2:29
- Label: Majestic 7188
- Composer: Jay Livingston
- Lyricist: Ray Evans

"To Each His Own" is a popular song with music written by Jay Livingston and lyrics by Ray Evans. It is the title song of the movie of the same name and was published in 1946 by Paramount Music. The duo were assigned to write this song after film composer Victor Young turned it down.

== Original 1946 recordings ==
In 1946, three different versions hit number one on the Billboard charts in the United States. Two other versions reached number three and number four.

- On the Billboard "Most Played" chart for August 24, 1946, and again on September 7, September 14 and October 5, all five versions appeared simultaneously in the Top Ten. While many popular songs of the pre-rock period had multiple hit versions – for example, "Dinah" had nine top-10 covers over the years, and 15 versions of "St. Louis Blues" charted between 1916 and 1953 – according to its co-composer Ray Evans, "To Each His Own" is the only song to take up half the slots on the Top Ten at the same time.
- Eddy Howard reached number one after debuting on the Most Played On the Air chart with his version of the song on July 6, 1946. Released by Majestic Records as catalog number 7188 and 1070, the single lasted 24 weeks on the chart, reaching the top spot on August 3 for eight weeks, and scoring number-one single of 1946 The two Howard releases had different B sides – "Cynthia's in Love" on Majestic 7188 and "Careless" on Majestic 1070.
- Freddy Martin & his Orchestra, featuring vocals by Stuart Wade, and Tony Martin both had their versions debut on the chart on August 8, 1946, with each remaining on the chart for twelve weeks. While Freddy Martin, whose version was released by RCA Victor Records, was able to top the chart for two weeks, Tony Martin's version, released by Mercury Records, peaked at number four.
- The next version to reach the Billboard charts was performed by The Modernaires with Paula Kelly. Released by Columbia Records, together they debuted on the chart on August 15, 1946, lasting 14 weeks on the chart and peaking at number three.
- The third recording to reach number one was by The Ink Spots, which was released by Decca Records. Reaching the charts on August 29, 1946, it remained on the chart for 14 weeks, and topped it on September 21. This version also reached number three on the Most-Played Juke Box Race Records chart.

1946 was the first full year in which Billboard ran its three main popular charts, "Best Selling", "Most Played Jukebox", and "Most Air Play". Each week in each section, 15 points were awarded for No. 1, 9 points for No. 2, 8 points for No. 3, and so on. There were no ties. The totals of all three categories were combined, and the highest numbers won. Eddy Howard's version of "To Each His Own" was the no. 1 record of the year, leading the runner-up by more than 100 points.

== Other recordings ==
- Margie Rayburn released a version of the song as a single in 1958, but it did not chart.
- Johnny Hartman included a version on his 1959 And I Thought About You album.
- The Platters covered "To Each His Own" in 1960, their version reaching number 21 (US).
- Marty Robbins covered the song on his 1961 album Just a Little Sentimental.
- Sam Cooke recorded the song for his 1965 LP Try a Little Love.
- Frankie Laine's 1968 version reached No. 82 on the U.S. Billboard Hot 100. It also spent four weeks at number two on the Easy Listening chart.
