= Wait till You See Her =

Song
- Published: 1942
- Songwriter: Lorenz Hart
- Composer: Richard Rodgers

"Wait till You See Her" (or, optionally, "Wait till You See Him") is a popular song. The music was written by Richard Rodgers, the lyrics by Lorenz Hart.

The song was published in 1942. It was introduced in the musical play By Jupiter (1942), where it was performed by Ronald Graham. Since then, the song has been recorded by many artists.

== Selected recordings ==
- Ella Fitzgerald recorded it on her 1956 Verve release: Ella Fitzgerald Sings the Rodgers & Hart Songbook; her version was remixed by De-Phazz in 2002.
- Frank Sinatra - included the song on the CD reissue of his album Close to You (1957). His version was originally recorded on April 4, 1956.
- The Hi-Lo's with Frank Comstock And His Orchestra - Love Nest (1958)
- Doris Day - Duet with André Previn (1962)
- Nancy Sinatra - the song was featured in 1967 TV special: Movin' with Nancy, starring Nancy Sinatra, released to home video in 2000.
- Johnny Hartman - on This One's for Tedi (1985)
- Kurt Elling - Close Your Eyes, Blue Note (1995)
- John Abercrombie Quartet - Wait till you see her, ECM 2102 (2009)
