= I've Been There =

Studio album by Johnny Hartman
- Released: June 1973
- Recorded: April 1973
- Venue: New York City
- Studio: Blue Rock Studio
- Genre: Jazz
- Length: 38:39
- Label: Perception
- Producer: Boo Frazier

Johnny Hartman chronology
Today (1972)	I've Been There (1973)	Johnny Hartman, Johnny Hartman (1977)

Professional ratings
Review scores
Source	Rating
AllMusic	2/5 stars
DownBeat	3/5 stars
The Penguin Guide to Jazz	2/5 stars

I've Been There is a studio album by American singer Johnny Hartman, released in 1973 by Perception Records. It was produced by Boo Frazier, and arranged and conducted by Tony Monte. Similar to his previous album – Today (1972) – Hartman includes several popular tunes by contemporary songwriters such as Paul Simon, Kris Kristofferson, and Antonio Carlos Jobim. Jazz musician Jimmy Heath is among the musicians on the album, performing on tenor saxophone and flute.

== Reception ==
The album received mostly positive reviews when it was released. Billboard selected it as one of their "Top Album Picks," saying, "The veteran ballad singer has a fine collection of tunes here and they emphasize his fine vocal artistry." Jazz Digest praised I've Been There as "a quality LP of good songs by a good singer," and Coda called it "a pleasurable set."

DownBeat reviewer Harvey Siders was more critical of the album. "The voice is there; so is the articulation. The intonation never falters; neither does the ability to dramatize. And yet, the overall result is disappointing. The blame is not Johnny's—although he sure as hell shouldn't have allowed this album to be released. . . . On rock-flavored tunes, such as Rainy Days, the backing sounds like dedicated jazzmen self-consciously trying to appeal to the bubblegum set." Siders praised "whichever guitarist plays the single-string runs on Meditation. His backing is intelligent and sensitive. And much credit to Johnny for taking Raindrops slow, and almost bluesy."

Later reviews have been negative. Stephen Thomas Erlewine at AllMusic gives the album two out of five stars, calling it "a polished collection of contemporary pop and soul hits as sung by the gifted jazz vocalist. . . . But Hartman is simply not suited for this straightahead style – he is too idiosyncratic to put himself into this straightjacket. As a result, I've Been There sounds awkward, with only a few moments rising to the merely pleasurable status.".

In The Last Balladeer: The Johnny Hartman Story, biographer Gregg Akkerman calls I've Been There "an album of considerably poor quality. . . . It came off sounding like good musicians were asked to play music they really weren't excited or knowledgeable about, and hoping something good would come of it." The only positive note, Akkerman claims, is the song "Raindrops Keep Falling on My Head," which he calls "the highlight of the album. . . . This arrangement was as good as the song ever sounded and worthy of future imitation."

== Reissues ==
I've Been There has been reissued on compact disc with Hartman's other album for Perception, Today (1972), initially as Today/I've Been There – The Perception Years (Collectables, 1997), and then as Raindrops Keep Falling on My Head (Definitive, 2003)

== Track listing ==
=== Side 1 ===
1. "59th Street Bridge Song (Feelin' Groovy)" (Paul Simon) – 2:05
2. "Raindrops Keep Fallin' on My Head" (Burt Bacharach, Hal David) – 4:50
3. "If" (David Gates) – 5:35
4. "Rainy Days and Mondays" (Paul Williams, Roger Nichols) – 3:57
5. "You Go to My Head" (J. Fred Coots, Haven Gillespie ) – 3:40

=== Side 2 ===
1. "Meditation" (Antonio Carlos Jobim, Newton Mendonça, Norman Gimbel) – 4:13
2. "The First Time Ever I Saw Your Face" (Ewan MacColl) – 3:55
3. "Sunday Son" (Jimmy Curtiss) – 3:50
4. "For the Good Times" (Kris Kristofferson) – 4:04
5. "Easy Come Easy Go" (Diane Hildebrand, Jack Keller) – 2:30

== Personnel ==
- Johnny Hartman – vocals
- Jimmy Heath – tenor saxophone, flute
- Ken Ascher – keyboards
- Al Gafa, Bob Rose – guitar
- Earl May – bass
- Don Reid – drums
- Tony Monte – arranger, conductor
- Boo Frazier – producer
- Eddie Korvin – engineer
