= You'd Be So Easy to Love =

1934 song by Cole Porter

Song by William Gaxton
- Written: 1934
- Published: 1936 by Chappell & Co.
- Songwriter: Cole Porter

"(You'd Be So) Easy to Love" is a popular song written by Cole Porter for William Gaxton to sing in the 1934 Broadway show Anything Goes. However, Gaxton was unhappy about its wide vocal range and it was cut from the musical. Porter re-wrote it for the 1936 film Born to Dance, where it was introduced by Eleanor Powell, James Stewart, and Frances Langford under its alternate title, "Easy to Love". The song was later added to the 1987 and 2011 revivals of Anything Goes under the complete title "You’d Be So Easy to Love".

Early hit versions were by Shep Fields, Frances Langford and Ray Noble.

== Other recordings ==
External audio
- You may hear the song "You'd Be So Easy to Love" performed by the Shep Fields Rippling Rhythm Orchestra in 1936; Here on Archive.org

- Shep Fields – recorded with his Rippling Rhythm Orchestra (1936)
- Billie Holiday – Quintessential Billie Holiday: Vol. II (1936) (recorded with Teddy Wilson and His Orchestra, October 21, 1936).
- Josephine Baker – C'est si facile de vous aimer (1937)
- Maxine Sullivan – recorded for Vocalion on October 22, 1937.
- Lee Wiley – recorded April 15, 1940, Hot House Rose (1996), Legendary Song Stylist (1999)
- Judy Garland – Life Begins for Andy Hardy (1941). Cut from final film. Released on the album Collector's Gems from MGM Films (1996).
- Bing Crosby – recorded December 24, 1947 and included in the album Bing Crosby Sings Cole Porter Songs (1949)
- Charlie Parker – Charlie Parker with Strings (Studio recordings of July 1950)
- Sammy Davis Jr. – Starring Sammy Davis Jr. (1955)
- Ella Fitzgerald – Ella Fitzgerald Sings the Cole Porter Songbook (1956)
- Johnny Mathis – Johnny Mathis (1957)
- Hank Mobley – Hank (with Donald Byrd playing the lead melody) (1957)
- Sonny Stitt – Personal Appearance (1957)
- Doris Day – Hooray for Hollywood (1958)
- Lem Winchester and Ramsey Lewis trio – A Tribute to Clifford Brown (1958)
- Shirley Bassey – The Fabulous Shirley Bassey (1959)
- Oscar Peterson – Oscar Peterson Plays the Cole Porter Songbook (1959)
- Linda Lawson – Introducing Linda Lawson (1960)
- Gene Ammons – Jug (1961)
- Frank Sinatra – Ring-A-Ding-Ding (1961)
- Al Hirt – Trumpet and Strings (1962)
- Bill Evans – Conception (Studio recording of April 1962, issue 1981, reissue 2014)
- Stan Kenton – Mellophonium Moods (1962)
- Cannonball Adderley – Nippon Soul (1963)
- Julie London – All Through the Night: Julie London Sings the Choicest of Cole Porter (1965)
- Johnny Hartman – Thank You for Everything (1998), rec. 1976
- Susannah McCorkle – Easy to Love: The Songs of Cole Porter (1996),
- Howard McGillin – Anything Goes 1987 revival cast recording (1987).
- Grover Mitchell – On Track with his New Blue Devils (1997)
- Harry Connick Jr. – Come by Me (1999)

== Film appearances ==
- 1936 Born to Dance – sung by Marjorie Lane (played by Eleanor Powell) and James Stewart, Frances Langford and danced by her and Buddy Ebsen
- 1946 Night and Day – sung by chorus
- 1947 This Time for Keeps – sung by Johnnie Johnston
- 1950 Side Street – sung by Jean Hagen
- 1953 Easy to Love – sung by Tony Martin and played often throughout the picture.
