= Lorne Lofsky =

Canadian jazz guitarist (born 1954)

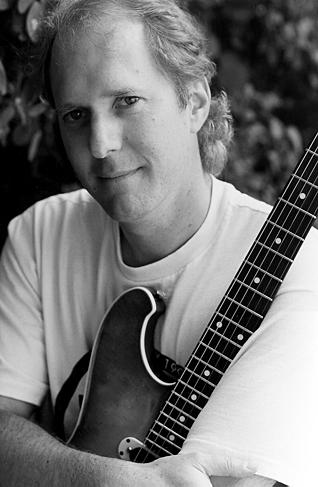
- Photo from Kincardine Summer Music Festival

Background information
- Born: May 10, 1954 (age 71); Toronto, Ontario, Canada
- Genres: Jazz
- Occupation(s): Musician, educator
- Instrument: Guitar
- Years active: 1970s–present
- Labels: Pablo
- Website: www.lornelofsky.com

Lorne Lofsky (born May 10, 1954) is a Canadian jazz guitarist. Considered a virtuoso guitarist, Lofsky is known for his collaborations with Oscar Peterson, Ed Bickert, and Kirk MacDonald.

== Early life and education ==
Lofsky was born in Toronto in 1954. He began playing rock music at school dances but later took an interest in jazz after hearing the album Kind of Blue by Miles Davis. In the 1970s, he attended York University and studied music while working at clubs in Toronto.

== Career ==
During the 1970s, Lofsky worked with Canadian musicians Butch Watanabe and Jerry Toth and visiting Americans Pepper Adams, Bob Brookmeyer, and Chet Baker.

In 1980, Lofsky met Canadian pianist Oscar Peterson, who produced his first album, It Could Happen to You. He toured with Peterson in the 1980s, and he toured and recorded as a member of Peterson's quartet and quintet in the 1990s. Lofsky has also worked with Ed Bickert, Ruby Braff, Rosemary Clooney, Kirk MacDonald, Rob McConnell, Tal Farlow, Dizzy Gillespie, Johnny Hartman, and Clark Terry.

From 1983 to 1991 Lofsky played in a quartet with jazz guitarist Ed Bickert. This collaboration yielded two recordings, This Is New, released by Concord Records, and a tour of Spain in 1991.

In the early-1980s, Lofsky began a musical association with saxophonist Kirk MacDonald, leading to the formation of a quartet. Various versions of the quartet have played festivals including the Atlantic Jazz Festival, Montreal's Upstairs Club, and Vancouver's Cotton Club.

Lofsky has taught at York University, Humber College, and the University of Toronto.

As of 2022, Lofsky was a member of the Canadian Jazz Collective.

== Discography ==
- It Could Happen to You (Pablo, 1980)
- Ed Bickert, Lorne Lofsky and Friends, (Unisson, 1985)
- This is New, with Ed Bickert (Concord, 1990)
- Lorne Lofsky (Jazz Inspiration, 1992)
- Bill Please (Jazz Inspiration, 1994)
- This Song is New (Modica Music, 2021)

With Brass Connection

- Brass Connection, (Innovation, 1982)
- A New Look, (Innovation, 1984)
- A Five Star Edition, (Innovation, 1988)

With Oscar Peterson

- Fallin'in love with Oscar (1994)
- The More I See You, (Telarc, 1995)
- An Oscar Peterson Christmas (Telarc, 1995)
- Oscar in Paris (Live at Salle Pleyel) (Telarc, 1996)

With Kirk Macdonald

- The Atlantic Sessions (Koch, 1997)
- New Beginnings (Radioland, 1998)

With others

- This One's for Tedi, by Johnny Hartman (Audiophile, 1981)
- Chet Baker in Buffalo (CCB, 1984)
- Le Rouge by Duncan Hopkins with Kenny Wheeler, (1993)
- Don't Get Around Much Anymore, Rob McConnell's Boss Brass (Concord, 1995)
- One Take, Joey DeFrancesco (Alma)
- What Is This Thing?, Inside Out (Romhog, 2004)
- Septology: The Black Forest Session by Canadian Jazz Collective (HGBS Blue Records, 2022)
