= You Stepped Out of a Dream =

1940 song by Nacio Herb Brown and Gus Kahn

Song
- Published: 1940
- Songwriters: Composer: Nacio Herb Brown; Lyricist: Gus Kahn

"You Stepped Out of a Dream" is a popular song with music written by Nacio Herb Brown and lyrics by Gus Kahn that was published in 1940. The song has become a pop and jazz standard, with many recorded versions.

It was a centerpiece in the 1941 musical film Ziegfeld Girl, in which it was sung by Tony Martin and accompanied an iconic image of Lana Turner walking down a grand staircase. Although Turner never officially sang or recorded the song, it became her theme song during her peak years as one of Hollywood's top leading ladies, often played when she entered a nightclub or restaurant. The song is played in the film The Abominable Dr. Phibes (1971) during a murder scene.

The song was added to the Chichester/London 2012 Revival version of the musical Singin' in the Rain.

== Other versions ==
- Anthony Braxton - Five Pieces 1975 (1975)
- Dave Brubeck – 1950
- Peter Cincotti
- Nat King Cole
- Ray Conniff
- Vic Damone - That Towering Feeling! (1956)
- Carla Boni (1965)
- Eddie Lockjaw Davis
- Teddy Edwards
- Stan Getz – 1950
- Dexter Gordon – A Swingin' Affair (1962)
- Johnny Griffin and Martial Solal – In and Out (1999)
- Johnny Hartman – This One's for Tedi (1985)
- Shirley Horn – You Won't Forget Me (1990)
- Ilse Huizinga - Out of a Dream (1997)
- Samara Joy - Portrait (2024)
- Barney Kessel – Kessel Plays Standards (1955)
- Kay Kyser
- Peggy Lee
- Guy Lombardo
- Julie London - Julie at Home (1960)
- Warne Marsh
- Johnny Mathis – Wonderful, Wonderful (1957)
- Glenn Miller with Ray Eberle – 1941
- Sergio Mendes & Brasil '66 - (1969)
- Oscar Peterson - Tristeza on Piano (1970)
- Sonny Rollins - Sonny Rollins, Vol. 2 (1957)
- McCoy Tyner - Fly_with_the_Wind (1976)
- Art Garfunkel - Some Enchanted Evening (2007)
