= Kirk MacDonald (musician) =

Canadian jazz musician and composer (born 1959)

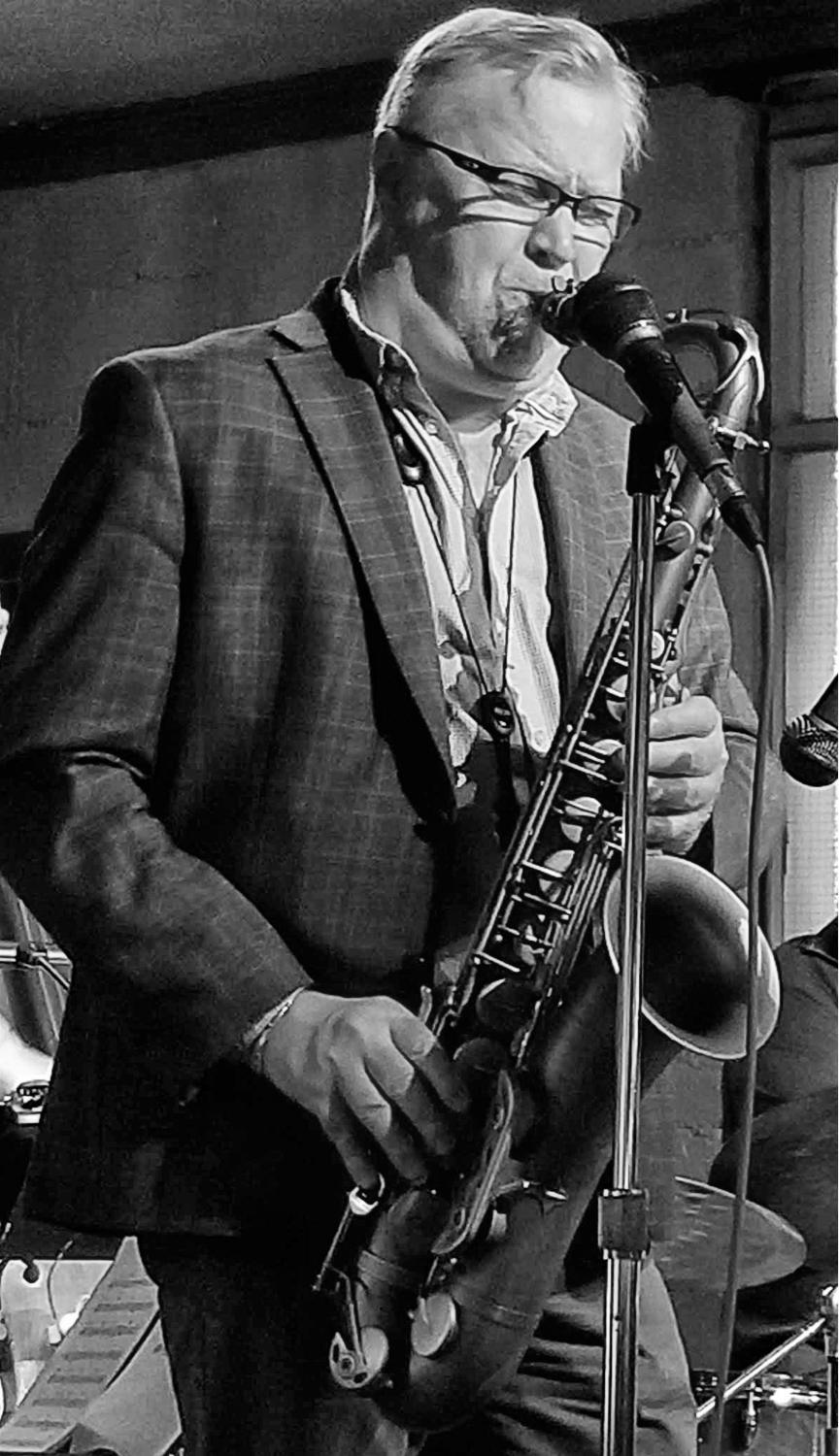
- Kirk MacDonald

Background information
- Born: October 2, 1959 (age 66); New Waterford, Cape Breton, Nova Scotia, Canada
- Genres: Jazz
- Occupations: Musician, Composer, Educator
- Instrument: Saxophone
- Website: https://kirkmacdonald.com

Kirk MacDonald (born 1959) is a Canadian jazz musician and composer. He has been nominated for four Juno Awards, with his album The Atlantic Sessions winning the 1999 Juno Award for Best Mainstream Jazz Album.

He has performed on over forty albums as leader and sideman and has participated in national broadcast recordings for CBC Radio. In addition to performing extensively throughout Canada, he has performed in the U.S., France, Spain, Italy, Holland, Monaco, Australia, Korea, Bermuda, and the Bahamas.

He has worked with Walter Bishop Jr., John Clayton, Rosemary Clooney, Brian Dickinson, Glenn Ferris, Sonny Greenwich, Eddie Henderson, Pat LaBarbera, Lorne Lofsky, Harold Mabern, Ron McClure, Jim McNeely, Vince Mendoza, James Moody, Bob Mover, Phil Nimmons, Sam Noto, Chris Potter, Bernie Senensky, Mike Stern, John Taylor, Kenny Wheeler, André White, and the Humber College Faculty Ensemble.

As a composer, he has recorded over fifty of his own compositions. His compositions have been arranged for large ensembles by Canadian and American arrangers. He has been active as an educator for almost 25 years at the college and university levels.

== Awards and nominations ==
=== As leader or soloist ===
- 2015 – Hagood Hardy Award SOCAN – Outstanding Jazz Artist of the Year
- 2015 – Juno Award for Jazz Album of the Year – Solo (Vista Obscura)
- 2015 – East Coast Music Award – Best Jazz Recording (Symmetry)
- 2015 – Toronto Musicians’ Association – Lifetime Achievement Award
- 2012 – Juno Award Nominee – Best Traditional Jazz Album (Deep Shadows)
- 2011 – Juno Award Nominee – Best Traditional Jazz Album (Songbook Vol. II)
- 2010 – Juno Award Nominee – Best Contemporary Jazz Album (Songbook Vol. 1)
- 2009 – the Canada Council's “Victor Martyn Lynch-Staunton Award”
- 2007 – Now Magazine “Saxophonist of the Year”
- 2005 – National Jazz Awards Nomination – Saxophonist of the Year
- 2004 – National Jazz Awards Nomination – Saxophonist of the Year
- 2003 – National Jazz Awards Nomination – Saxophonist of the Year
- 2002 – Winner – 4th Concours International de Soliste de Jazz – Monaco
- 2001 – Juno Award Nominee – Best Mainstream Jazz Album (New Beginnings)
- 2001 – Canadian Indie Music Award Nomination – Best Jazz Recording (New Beginnings)
- 1999 – Juno Award – Best Mainstream Jazz Album (The Atlantic Sessions)
- 1999 – Jazz Report Awards – Album of the Year (The Atlantic Sessions)
- 1999 – Jazz Report Awards – Tenor Saxophonist of the Year
- 1996 – Nomination for East Coast Music Award – Jazz Artist of the Year (Reminiscence)

=== With other artists ===
- 2009 – Juno Award Nominee – Contemporary Jazz Album of the Year (Existential Detective) (Random Access Large Ensemble)
- 2003 – Montreal Jazz Festival Prix de Jazz (Nancy Walker Quartet)
- 2001 – Juno Award Nominee – Best Vocal Jazz (This Is How Men Cry) (Marc Jordan) Blue Note Records
- 2000 – Juno Award Nominee – Best Mainstream Jazz Album (New Horizons) (Bernie Senensky) Timeless
- 1999 – Juno Award Nominee – Best Mainstream Jazz Album (Siren's Song) (Maritime Jazz Orchestra) Justin Time
- 1999 – Montreal Jazz Festival Prix de Jazz (Chris Mitchell Quintet)

=== Educational Awards ===
- 2011 Humber College – Distinguished Faculty Award
- 2009 Humber College – College Innovation of the Year Award (Music Department)
- 2008 Humber College – Teaching Excellence Certificate
- 2004/05 Humber College – Award of Excellence for Outstanding Academic Contribution

== Discography ==
=== As leader ===
- Trane of Thought Live at the Rex (Cellar Live) - Recorded at The Rex Jazz & Blues Bar in Toronto on September 20 and 21, 2018
- Generations (HGBS Blue Records Canada) - Recorded at Revolution Recording Studio, Toronto, ON, Canada on March 11 & 12, 2018
- Silent Voices (Jazz Compass) - released February 24, 2017
- Common Ground (Independent) - Recorded at Humber College Studio June 14, 15 2015
- Vista Obscura (ADDO) – Recorded July 27 and 28, 2014 in Toronto, Ontario
- Symmetry (ADDO) – Recorded June 8 and 9, 2013 in Toronto, Ontario
- Family Suite for Large Ensemble (ADDO) – Recorded January 7 and 8, 2012 at Humber Recording Studios in Toronto, Ontario
- Deep Shadows (ADDO) – Recorded May 2, 2010 in Toronto Released April 2011
- Songbook Vol 2 (ADDO) – Recorded June 18 – 21, 2009 at Humber Recording Studios in Toronto, Ontario
- Songbook Vol 1 (ADDO) – Recorded June 18 – 21, 2009 at Humber Recording Studios in Toronto, Ontario
- Family Suite (Romhog) – Recorded at Humber Recording Studios, Toronto, Ontario, August 11 – 13, 2008
- Pure and Simple (Justin Time) – Recorded April 2 & 3, 2001 at AKW Studios, Montreal
- New Beginnings (Radioland) – Recorded at: Reaction Studio, Toronto, Ontario
- The Atlantic Sessions (Koch) – Recorded July 19 & 20, 1997 at Atlantimix Studios Halifax, Nova Scotia
- Reminiscence (Cornerstone) – Recorded at: Glenn Gould Studio, Toronto, July 15–17, 1994
- The Revellers (Unity) – Recorded: March 18 & 19, 1990 at Jazz Partners Studios, Toronto

=== As sideman ===
Album	Artist	Label	Release date
World Creativity	Barry Romberg's Random Access	Romhog	2011
Code White	Andre White and Joe Sullivan	Chance	2011
Diversity	Michelle Gregoire		2010
Was, Shall, Why, Because	Barry Romberg's Random Access	Romhog	2009
Existential Detective	Barry Romberg's Random Access	Romhog	2008
More Today Than Yesterday	Kingsley Ettienne Quartet	Ettienne Music	2008
Big Giant Head	Barry Romberg's Random Access Quartet	Romhog	2007
2 Am	Brian Chahley Quartet		2005
When She Dreams	Nancy Walker Quartet	Justin Time	2004
Reaching	Michelle Gregoire	Boathouse Records	2004
Group of Seven Suite	Tony Quarrington	CBC Records	2003
Levitation	Nancy Walker Quartet	Unity/Paige Records	2003
Signal	Andre White Quartet	Cornerstone Records	2001
Shapeshift	Kieran Overs	Unity/Paige Records	1999
Sterling Silver	Ken Skinner	Village Jazz	1995
Steppin' Out	Kingsley Ettienne	S-J Records	1989
No Attachments	Gene Smith Quartet		
Past Present Future	Charlie Gray	Saluki Music	
Spectrum	Chris Mitchell Quintet	Justin Time	
New Horizons	Bernie Senesky Quintet	Timeless Records	
This Is How Men Cry	Marc Jordan		
Now Hear This	Sam Noto Quintet	Supermono	
The Witches of Red Beard	Chris Mitchell	KOCH	
Now and Now Again	Maritime Jazz Orchestra	Justin Time	
Siren's Song	Maritime Jazz Orchestra	Justin Time	
Moment's Notice	Bill King and the Jazz Report All Stars	Radioland	
Live In Session	Liberty Silver	Radioland	
One Bright Morning	Tony Quarrington		
Out on a Limb	Dave Hutchinson	Davrio Productions	
La Zona Blanca	Pat Beliveau	PABCO Music	
Manteca	Manteca	Ready Records	
Second Debut	Joe Coughlin	Innovation Records	
Sunflowers Light the Room	Howard Gladstone		

== Compositions ==
=== Original compositions recorded ===
==== As leader ====
SONGBOOK VOL. I (ADDO Jazz Recordings) New Piece Manhattan Getaway Moulage Calendula By Invitation Only Fleeting Goodbye Glenn

FAMILY SUITE (Romhog Records) Movement I Movement II Movement III Movement IV Movement V Movement VI Movement VII Movement VIII Movement IX Movement X Movement XI

PURE AND SIMPLE (Justin Time) New Piece Alicante Opal Essence Five By Five

NEW BEGINNINGS (Radioland) On The Sierra Nevada Starlight Lament For A Better Tomorrow Sideways Kirk's Blues Calendula New Beginnings

THE ATLANTIC SESSIONS (KOCH Jazz) The Mill Dam Kirk's Blues Monkie's Uncle 1000 West Two Night Stand

REMINISCENCE (Counterpoint) Reminiscence Advance Notice Moulage Deep Shadows Manhattan Getaway For Melvin Moon In Pisces Portrait Of Lucie

THE REVELLERS (Unity-Page) 224 Blues Forward Motion The Revellers Carnival

THE POWER OF BEAUTY (A Tribute To Stan Getz) (Various Artists) (Radioland) 517

==== Original compositions recorded by other artists ====
SIGNAL Andre White (Cornerstone) By Invitation Only Goodbye Glen

SHAPESHIFT Keiran Overs (Unity-Page) Moon In Pisces

THE WITCHES OF RED BEARD Chris Mitchell (KOCH-Jazz) The Buddy System You See But You Don't Hear

SPECTRUM Chris Mitchell (Justin Time) Vanda Justina Fleeting The Torch Bearers

LA DOLCE VITA New Berlin Chamber Ensemble (NBCE) Moulage

SECOND DEBUT Joe Coughlin (Innovation) Spring Lyric Waltz For A Libra Lady Seascape

UNDER A TREE Toronto Jazz Orchestra (TJO Records) Alicante (arranged by Mike Smith)

AWAKENING University of Toronto 10 O'Clock Jazz Orchestra (UTJ) Calendula (arranged by Terry Promane)
