= Today (Johnny Hartman album) =

1972 studio album by Johnny Hartman

Studio album by Johnny Hartman
- Released: November 1972
- Recorded: August 1972
- Venue: New York City
- Studio: Blue Rock Studio
- Genre: Jazz
- Length: 39:42
- Label: Perception
- Producer: Boo Frazier

Johnny Hartman chronology
I Love Everybody (1967)	Today (1972)	I've Been There (1973)

Professional ratings
Review scores
Source	Rating
AllMusic	2/5 stars
DownBeat	5/5 stars
The Virgin Encyclopedia of Jazz	3/5 stars

Today is a studio album by American singer Johnny Hartman, released in 1972 by Perception Records. It was Hartman's first recording since 1967 and marked a new phase in his career, with the inclusion of material by more contemporary songwriters such as Jimmy Webb, Kris Kristofferson, and Paul Williams. Musicians on the album include well-known jazz instrumentalists such as George Coleman, Earl May, and Billy Higgins.

Today was the only album by Hartman to ever appear on the pop charts, spending three weeks on the Cash Box Album Charts, where it peaked at No. 160.

== Reception ==
Initial reception to the album was consistently positive. DownBeat awarded Today its highest five-star rating, and reviewer Robert Rusch hailed it as Hartman's "greatest recording to date. . . . Unconditionally recommended." Rusch praised Hartman as "an exceptional ballad singer with beautiful control, sensitivity, and range," and said, "he uses his exceptional shifts in tension and phrasing to completely immerse the listener in the lyrics, mood and coloring of the tunes." The review also applauded the backing musicians, calling them "an unusually inspired combo, which on its own plays five-star jazz."

Phyl Garland, music critic for Ebony magazine, welcomed Hartman's return to the recording studio and said: "He sings with a rare ease and intimacy as apparent on the standouts Betcha By Golly Wow and a version of Didn't We that is a tour de force of vocal range."

Billboard chose Today as a four-star Special Merit Pick, and Cash Box selected it as a Pop Pick, saying that Hartman "soars above the background gentility and supercool ambience to project a style that is both original and totally involving."

Village Voice reviewer Victor Stein wrote: "Hartman's voice, for me, is the finest of any male singer's. It's a rich baritone, to be compared to such things as port wine and the mists of a summer night. Yet, for all its richness, it is lean, objective, with no sentimentality clinging to its edges." He mentions "Betcha By Golly, Wow", saying: "This is a bubble-gum tune, and by treating it as such, Hartman raises it to the level of a tender jazz ballad."

More recently, however, Stephen Thomas Erlewine at AllMusic gave the album low marks, saying: "Today, Johnny Hartman's first record for Perception, was a new beginning of sorts. It just wasn't a very good beginning." Erlewine claims that the songs, though good, don't lend themselves to Hartman's vocal style, and he criticizes the production on the album. "There are moments on Today that work," he concludes, "but by and large this is a missed opportunity.

Gregg Akkerman, in his 2012 biography of Hartman, expressed mixed views about Today, saying: "[W]hen placed in the context of its time, some special music had been created. . . . Hartman recorded 'contemporary' hits in a manner that presented him as relevant without denying his past." Akkerman highlights "By the Time I Get to Phoenix", with its "rock solid sense of time in the vocals and a devilishly technical Coleman sax solo," and "the light R&B groove of 'We've Only Just Begun' [that] provided Hartman with a comfortable backing over which to exploit the full dynamic range of his voice." On the other hand, Akkerman criticizes the album's "overall harshness of sound and the incessant vocalizing of the pianist." He concludes by saying that Today "offered an inspired collection of genres and tempos, [but] there are times it played like a demo for the album Hartman should have made."

== Reissues ==
Today has been reissued on compact disc with Hartman's other album for Perception, I've Been There (1973), initially as Today/I've Been There – The Perception Years (Collectables, 1997), and then as Raindrops Keep Fallin' on My Head (Definitive, 2003).

== Track listing ==
=== Side 1 ===
1. "By the Time I Get to Phoenix" (Jimmy Webb) – 4:00
2. "Didn't We" (Webb) – 4:25
3. "Games People Play" (Joe South) – 4:27
4. "Betcha By Golly Wow" (Thom Bell, Linda Creed) – 4:10
5. "Summer Wind" (Johnny Mercer, Heinz Meier) – 3:20

=== Side 2 ===
1. "Help Me Make It Through the Night" (Kris Kristofferson) – 4:05
2. "Folks Who Live on the Hill" (Jerome Kern, Oscar Hammerstein II) – 5:45
3. "We've Only Just Begun" (Paul Williams, Roger Nichols) – 5:00
4. "I've Got to Be Me (Walter Marks) – 4:40

A tenth song, entitled "Impossible/Something (Medley)," is listed on the front album cover but not included on the record. According to Akkerman, the track probably wasn't completed and it's doubtful an outtake exists.

== Personnel ==
- Johnny Hartman – vocals
- George Coleman – saxophone
- Roland Prince – guitar
- Herman Foster – piano
- Earl May – bass
- Billy Higgins – drums
- Boo Frazier – producer
- Eddie Korvin – engineer
