= Ken Skinner =

- Born: Kenneth Skinner Jr. June 28, 1962 (age 64); Montreal, Quebec, Canada
- Genre: Jazz
- Occupation: Pianist

Kenneth Skinner Jr. is a jazz pianist, head of the group Ken Skinner and the jazzmongers!.

Ken Skinner and the jazzmongers! recordings have showcased jazz players such as Bob Mover, Kirk MacDonald, Kevin Turcotte, Jake Wilkinson and Duncan Hopkins. Also, Skinner has sat in at jam sessions with the likes of Wynton Marsalis. His jazz material can be found on 2 CDs on the Village Jazz label. One Lucky Piano features 16 of Canada's pianists all recorded on the piano formerly housed in the famed "Montreal Bistro" in Toronto.

Skinner's music has been included in 3 feature-length films, 2 videos, with numerous appearances on television and radio. Of those films is "Pitch" produced by Kenny Hotz and Spencer Rice, also known as "Kenny and Spenny". During a period of activity in 1996, he worked with prima ballerina Kimberley Glasco, of the National Ballet of Canada, on two projects, one of those being a Bravo! video for "Jombo Memsahb" found on the jazzmongers! first release Stirling Silver. A second video, also for the Bravo! network, "Maroon" is the title track of the jazzmongers! second release, earning Ken the title of Bravo! artist of the week.

== Discography ==
- Live: Stirling Theatre (Village Jazz 9901, 1995)
- Maroon (Village Jazz 9902, 1997)
- Kin of Kensington (Global Sync Media, 1999)
- One Lucky Piano (Timely Manor, 2007)
