= All Through the Night (Cole Porter song) =

1934 song by Cole Porter

"All Through the Night" is a 1934 popular song written by Cole Porter for his 1934 musical Anything Goes. The melody's distinguishing characteristic is a descending chromatic scale, starting on the third, interrupted by an octave leap after four bars. It was introduced by William Gaxton and Betina Hume. Hit versions in 1935 were recorded by Paul Whiteman (vocal by Bob Lawrence) and by Harry Rosenthal (vocal by Helen Ward).

== Other notable recordings ==
- Bing Crosby - Anything Goes soundtrack (1956)
- Ella Fitzgerald - Ella Fitzgerald Sings the Cole Porter Songbook (1956)
- Julie London - All Through the Night: Julie London Sings the Choicest of Cole Porter (1965)
- Johnny Mathis - Wonderful, Wonderful (1957)
- Johnnie Ray – ′Til Morning (1958)
- Andy Williams – In the Arms of Love (1966)
