= Once in Every Life =

Studio album by Johnny Hartman
- Released: 1980
- Recorded: August 11, 1980
- Studio: Master Sound Productions, Franklin Square, NY
- Genre: Jazz
- Length: 39:41
- Label: Bee Hive Records BH 7012
- Producer: Jim Neumann, Susan Neumann

Johnny Hartman chronology
Johnny Hartman, Johnny Hartman (1977)	Once in Every Life (1980)	This One's for Tedi (1980)

Once in Every Life is an album by vocalist Johnny Hartman which was recorded in 1980 and released on the Bee Hive label. Analogue Productions remastered it and released it as a hybrid SACD in 2017.

Four songs from the album, "Easy Living", "I See Your Face Before Me", "It Was Almost Like a Song" and "For All We Know", were used on the soundtrack of the 1995 movie The Bridges of Madison County, posthumously burnishing Hartman's exposure and reputation.

== Reception ==
Professional ratings
Review scores
Source	Rating
AllMusic	4.5/5 stars

The AllMusic review by Scott Yanow stated, "Johnny Hartman's next-to-last album finds the 57-year-old singer still in prime form. His rich baritone voice is joined by a sextet ... The ballads range from slow to a brighter medium-tempo pace, and Hartman shows that he still had it this late in his career".

== Track listing ==
No.	Title	Writer(s)	Length
1.	"Easy Living"	Ralph Rainger, Leo Robin	5:53
2.	"It Was Almost Like a Song"	Archie Jordan, Hal David	2:33
3.	"Wave"	Antônio Carlos Jobim	6:46
4.	"By Myself"	Arthur Schwartz, Howard Dietz	4:26
5.	"For All We Know"	J. Fred Coots, Sam M. Lewis	5:02
6.	"Will You Still Be Mine"	Matt Dennis, Tom Adair	3:30
7.	"Nobody Home"	Loonis McGlohon	3:29
8.	"I Could Write a Book"	Richard Rodgers, Lorenz Hart	3:27
9.	"I See Your Face Before Me"	Schwartz, Dietz	4:37
10.	"Moonlight in Vermont"	Karl Suessdorf, John Blackburn	2:58
Total length:			39:41

== Personnel ==
- Johnny Hartman – vocals
- Joe Wilder – trumpet, flugelhorn
- Frank Wess – tenor saxophone, flute
- Billy Taylor – piano
- Al Gafa — guitar
- Victor Gaskin – bass
- Keith Copeland – drums
