= Johnny Mathis (album) =

Studio album by Johnny Mathis
- Released: July 16, 1956
- Recorded: March 14 – April 6, 1956
- Studio: CBS 30th Street Studio; New York City
- Genre: Jazz
- Length: 45:17
- Label: Columbia
- Producer: George Avakian

Johnny Mathis chronology
Johnny Mathis (1956)	Wonderful, Wonderful (1957)

Alternate cover
- UK album cover

Johnny Mathis is the first studio album by vocalist Johnny Mathis that was released by Columbia Records in 1956. The subtitle A New Sound in Popular Song can be found on the back cover but not on the front of the album or the disc label; in fact, this Mathis LP has been referred to as "the jazz album".

This release did not make it onto Billboard magazine's Best Selling Pop Albums chart, which had 15 positions available at the time.

Columbia/Legacy released the album on compact disc for the first time as a 40th Anniversary Edition on May 7, 1996, and included a previously unreleased recording of "I'm Glad There Is You".

In the UK the album was originally issued by Fontana Records with alternate artwork and a different track listing. On May 14, 2001, this version had its first pressing on compact disc as one of two albums on one CD, the other album being its 1957 follow-up, Wonderful Wonderful.

== History ==
In the liner notes for the original album, Columbia Records executive and album producer George Avakian wrote of a visit to a nightclub to hear Mathis during a trip to San Francisco in the summer of 1955: "I gave in to the blandishments of my good friend Helen Noga... and agreed to go listen to a 19-year-old local boy." The young singer's talent was immediately apparent: "Before Johnny finished his second song, I knew I was going to sign him.... Obviously he had more training than most pop singers; his extraordinary breath control and sweeping range indicated that. He could do as many different things as four very different singers might, and do them well. All he needed was experience and seasoning." Avakian knew this would take time and returned in January 1956 to see how his skills were developing. "Johnny's repertoire, already unusually broad, had grown enormously, and so had his poise and control. He had learned what to do with his hands, how to make and maintain close contact with his audience, and to program his songs most effectively. Best of all, he had grown so much in quality that I had no doubt that the time had come to record."

Avakian also described what he had in mind for this project: "I visualized a series of intimate small-band sessions with a variety of arrangers, each given carte blanche as to instrumentation and treatment within the overall interpretation of each song as taped as a guide by Johnny in San Francisco." As the head of the jazz department at Columbia, however, he had developed an ear for that vocal style. "Johnny's singing is thoroughly jazz-oriented, so naturally arrangers were chosen who had a thorough command of the jazz idiom, as well as the ability to write imaginatively for a pop vocalist." He explained that these arrangers had "done a certain amount of what might be called experimental writing. Under the circumstances, it is not surprising that these arrangements contain many elements seldom encountered in pop vocal accompaniments."

Despite this album's failure to chart, Avakian also produced the Wonderful Wonderful LP for Mathis the following year.

== Reception ==
Professional ratings
Review scores
Source	Rating
Allmusic	4.5/5 stars
The Encyclopedia of Popular Music	3/5 stars

Cub Koda of AllMusic wrote "Although Mathis swings comfortably on these sides, the fit wasn't a good one, and the album wasn't a commercial success.

== Track listing (US) ==
=== Side one ===
1. "Autumn in Rome" (Sammy Cahn, Alessandro Cicognini, Paul Weston) – 3:56
2. "Easy to Love" from Born to Dance (Cole Porter) – 2:29
3. "Street of Dreams" (Victor Young, Sam M. Lewis) – 2:15
4. "Love, Your Magic Spell is Everywhere" from The Trespasser (Edmund Goulding, Elsie Janis) – 2:59
5. "Prelude to a Kiss" (Duke Ellington, Irving Mills, Irving Gordon) – 4:26
6. "Babalu" (Margarita Lecuona) – 2:47

=== Side two ===
1. "Caravan" (Juan Tizol, Duke Ellington, Irving Mills) – 3:59
2. "In Other Words (Fly Me to the Moon)" (Bart Howard) – 3:52
3. "Star Eyes" from I Dood It (Don Raye, Gene DePaul) – 2:48
4. "It Might as Well Be Spring" from State Fair (Richard Rodgers, Oscar Hammerstein II) – 4:47
5. "Cabin in the Sky" from Cabin in the Sky (Vernon Duke, John La Touche) – 2:57
6. "Angel Eyes" from Jennifer (Matt Dennis, Earl Brent) – 4:19

=== 1996 CD bonus track ===
The album's first compact disc release in 1996 included one bonus track that was previously unavailable:

- "I'm Glad There Is You" (Jimmy Dorsey, Paul Madeira) – 3:43

=== 2017 CD bonus tracks ===
The album's CD release as part of the 2017 box set The Voice of Romance: The Columbia Original Album Collection included "I'm Glad There Is You" and one other track, which had not been available before:

- "Out of This World" (Harold Arlen, Johnny Mercer) – 2:43

== Track listing (UK) ==
=== Side one ===
1. "Wild Is the Wind" from Wild Is the Wind (Dimitri Tiomkin, Ned Washington) – 2:24
2. "Easy to Love" (Cole Porter) – 2:29
3. "Street of Dreams" (Victor Young, Sam M. Lewis) – 2:15
4. "Love, Your Magic Spell Is Everywhere" (Edmund Goulding, Elsie Janis) – 2:59
5. "Prelude to a Kiss" (Duke Ellington, Irving Mills, Irving Gordon) – 4:26
6. "No Love (But Your Love)" (Billy Myles) – 2:19

=== Side two ===
1. "Come to Me" (Robert Allen, Peter Lind Hayes) – 3:05
2. "In Other Words (Fly Me to the Moon)" (Bart Howard) – 3:52
3. "Star Eyes" (Don Raye, Gene DePaul) – 2:48
4. "It Might As Well Be Spring" (Richard Rodgers, Oscar Hammerstein II) – 4:47
5. "When I Am with You" (Al Stillman, Ben Weisman) – 2:59
6. "The Twelfth of Never" (Jerry Livingston, Paul Francis Webster) – 2:26

== Recording dates and personnel ==
The 1996 CD and 2017 box set provided the session dates. The musicians for each song were listed on the back cover of the original album and in the liner notes of the box set.

- March 14, 1956 – "Out of This World", "Street of Dreams"
  - Teo Macero – arranger, conductor
  - Art Farmer – trumpet
  - Eddie Bert – trombone
  - Don Butterfield – tuba
  - Danny Bank – flute and baritone sax
  - John La Porta – clarinet and alto sax
  - Wally Cirillo – piano
  - Milt Hinton – bass
  - Ed Shaughnessy – drums
- March 15, 1956 – "Angel Eyes", "Star Eyes"
  - Bob Prince – arranger, conductor; vibraphone and bongo drums
  - Nick Travis – trumpet
  - Al Richman – French horn
  - Phil Woods – alto sax
  - Sol Schlinger – baritone sax
  - Gerry Citron – piano
  - Teddy Kotick – bass
  - Joe Harris – drums
- March 19, 1956 – "Autumn in Rome", "Cabin in the Sky", "I'm Glad There Is You"
  - Manny Albam – arranger, conductor
  - Bernie Glow – trumpet
  - Ray Beckenstein – flute
  - Ben Harrod – oboe
  - Hal McKusick – clarinet and alto sax
  - Danny Bank – bass clarinet
  - Ed Costa – piano and vibraphone
  - Barry Galbraith – guitar
  - Milt Hinton – bass
  - Osie Johnson – drums
- March 21, 1956 – "Easy to Love", "It Might As Well Be Spring", "Love, Your Magic Spell Is Everywhere"
  - Gil Evans – arranger, conductor
  - Jimmy Maxwell – first trumpet
  - Buck Clayton – second trumpet and solos
  - J. J. Johnson – trombone
  - Tom Mitchell – bass trombone
  - John La Porta – alto sax
  - Hank Jones – piano
  - Bill Pemberton – bass
  - Billy Exiner – drums
  - The ending of "It Might As Well Be Spring" was transcribed by Evans from a trio arrangement made for Mathis by Jerry Cournoyer.
- March 23, 1956 – "Babalu", "Caravan"
  - Teo Macero – arranger, conductor
  - Nick Travis – trumpet
  - Eddie Bert – trombone
  - Hal McKusick – clarinet and alto sax
  - Danny Bank – flute and baritone sax
  - Gerry Citron – piano
  - Teddy Kotick – bass
  - Joe Harris – drums
  - Bob Prince – bongo drums and percussion
- April 6, 1956 – "In Other Words (Fly Me to the Moon)", "Prelude to a Kiss"
  - John Lewis – arranger, conductor; piano
  - Robert Di Domenica – flute
  - James Pellerite – flute
  - Harry Shulman – oboe
  - A. J. Sciacca – clarinet
  - Hal McKusick – clarinet
  - Jack Kreiselman – bass clarinet
  - Manuel Zegler – bassoon
  - Gunther Schuller – French horn
  - George Nadaf – French horn
  - John Barber – tuba
  - Janet Putnam – harp
  - Herb Ellis – guitar
  - Ray Brown – bass
  - Connie Kay – drums

Unused recordings

The liner notes for the 1996 release of the album on compact disc include a list of the songs that were also recorded at these sessions but went unused and were destroyed in 1958:

- March 14, 1956 – "I Love You"
- March 15, 1956 – "Will You Still Be Mine", "Just Friends"
- March 19, 1956 – "I Married an Angel", "You Are Too Beautiful"
- March 21, 1956 – "Stella by Starlight", "When Your Lover Has Gone"
- March 23, 1956 – "Will You Still Be Mine", "The Lady Is a Tramp", "Flamingo"
- April 6, 1956 – "Easy Living", "The Song Is You"

== Bibliography ==
- Whitburn, Joel (2010), Joel Whitburn Presents Top Pop Albums, Seventh Edition, Record Research Inc., ISBN 0-89820-183-7
