= All of Me: The Debonair Mr. Hartman =

Studio album by Johnny Hartman
- Released: 1957
- Recorded: November 1956
- Venue: New York City
- Genre: Jazz
- Length: 37:34
- Label: Bethlehem; BCP 6014
- Producer: Red Clyde

Johnny Hartman chronology
Songs from the Heart (1956)	All of Me: The Debonair Mr. Hartman (1957)	Johnny Hartman Sings...Just You, Just Me (1956)

All of Me: The Debonair Mr. Hartman is a 1957 album by Jazz singer Johnny Hartman. It was released on the Bethlehem label. The album was reissued in 2000 with four additional tracks, alternate takes of songs from the original album.

== Reception ==
Professional ratings
Review scores
Source	Rating
Allmusic	3/5 stars
The Penguin Guide to Jazz	3.5/4 stars

Scott Yanow reviewed All of Me for Allmusic and wrote that the album's "emphasis is on ballads (always Hartman's strong point) with the highlights including 'Blue Skies,' 'Tenderly,' 'The Lamp Is Low' and 'I Concentrate on You.'"

== Track listing ==
1. "Blue Skies" (Irving Berlin) – 2:57
2. "I Could Make You Care" (Sammy Cahn, Saul Chaplin) – 3:36
3. "Tenderly" (Walter Gross, Jack Lawrence) – 3:23
4. "The Lamp Is Low" (Peter DeRose, Mitchell Parish, Maurice Ravel, Bert Shefter) – 2:44
5. "While We're Young" (William Engvick, Morty Palitz, Alec Wilder) – 2:58
6. "The Birth of the Blues" (Lew Brown, Buddy DeSylva, Ray Henderson) – 2:57
7. "I'll Follow You" (Fred E. Ahlert, Roy Turk) – 3:34
8. "I Concentrate on You" (Cole Porter) – 3:50
9. "Stella by Starlight" (Ned Washington, Victor Young) – 3:47
10. "I Get a Kick Out of You" (Cole Porter) – 3:09
11. "The End of a Love Affair" (Edward Redding) – 3:21
12. "All of Me" (Gerald Marks, Seymour Simons) – 2:19

Alternate takes released on 2000 CD reissue

13. "Blue Skies" – 3:27
14. "I Get a Kick Out of You" – 3:25
15. "Birth of the Blues" – 3:00
16. "All of Me" – 2:26

== Personnel ==
From The Last Balladeer: The Johnny Hartman Story.

- Johnny Hartman – vocals

The Ernie Wilkins Group (tracks 1, 6, 10, and 12):

- Howard McGhee – trumpet
- Ernie Royal – trumpet
- Frank Rehak – trombone
- Anthony Ortega – alto saxophone
- Lucky Thompson – tenor saxophone
- Jerome Richardson – tenor saxophone, flute
- Danny Bank – baritone saxophone
- Hank Jones – piano
- Milt Hinton – double bass
- Osie Johnson – drums
- Ernie Wilkins – arranger, conductor (1,6,10, and 12)

The Bethlehem Orchestra (also referred to as Frank Hunter's Orchestra, tracks 2–5, 7–9, and 11)

- Frank Hunter – arranger, conductor
- Frank Hunter string orchestra
