= Wonderful, Wonderful (Johnny Mathis album) =

Studio album by Johnny Mathis
- Released: July 8, 1957
- Recorded: March 27, 1957; March 28, 1957; April 1, 1957
- Studio: CBS 30th Street Studio, New York City
- Genre: Vocal
- Length: 36:38
- Label: Columbia
- Producer: George Avakian

Johnny Mathis chronology
Johnny Mathis (1956)	Wonderful, Wonderful (1957)	Warm (1957)

Alternate cover
- UK album cover

Professional ratings
Review scores
Source	Rating
Allmusic	3/5 stars
The Encyclopedia of Popular Music	3/5 stars

Wonderful, Wonderful is the second album by American pop singer Johnny Mathis. It was released on July 8, 1957, on the Columbia Records label but does not include his hit song of the same name or any of his songs that were released as singles that year. The liner notes on the back of the original album cover proclaim that "he stamps as his very own such familiar rhythm tunes as 'Too Close for Comfort' and 'That Old Black Magic', injects new life in well-known ballads such as 'All Through the Night', gives new hearings to several fine standards that have been neglected in recent years, and even introduces a brand new ballad (Alex Fogarty's 'Will I Find My Love Today?')."

This sophomore effort debuted on Billboard magazine's list of the 25 Best-Selling Pop LPs in the issue dated September 9 of that year and reached number four during its 26 weeks there. The album debuted on the Cashbox albums chart in the issue dated August 19, 1957, and remained on the chart for 29 weeks, peaking at number six.

The album was initially only available in the monaural format but was reissued in 1962 with a banner added to the original cover that read, "Electronically Re-channeled for Stereo". It was issued in Great Britain by Fontana Records in 1957 with a different jacket design and cover photo and was released for the first time on compact disc on May 14, 2001, as one of two albums on one CD, the other LP being the UK version of his self-titled 1956 debut.

== Reception ==
AllMusic's Joe Viglione had high praise for Mathis here. "Even at the outset of his career, the voice that would become so familiar is in control and not just flirting with perfection -- the instrument is perfectly tuned and full of life." The reviewer also wrote, "The production is sublime and the album is a real treasure" and that "Jimmy Abato's alto sax and Ernie Royal's trumpet do wonders next to Mathis's voice."

Disc notes "Mathis swings through beat numbers and ballads through with eqeal style and pace."

== Track listing ==
=== Side one ===
1. "Will I Find My Love Today?" (Alex Fogarty, Sydney Shaw) – 3:32
2. "Looking at You" (Cole Porter) – 2:16
3. "Let Me Love You" (Bart Howard) – 3:47
4. "All Through the Night" from Anything Goes (Porter) – 2:56
5. "It Could Happen to You" from And the Angels Sing (Johnny Burke, Jimmy Van Heusen) – 3:47
6. "That Old Black Magic" (Harold Arlen, Johnny Mercer) – 2:51

=== Side two ===
1. "Too Close for Comfort" from Mr. Wonderful (Jerry Bock, George David Weiss, Larry Holofcener) – 2:34
2. "In the Wee Small Hours of the Morning" (David Mann, Bob Hilliard) – 3:13
3. "Year After Year" (Howard) – 3:12
4. "Early Autumn" (Ralph Burns, Woody Herman, Johnny Mercer) – 3:38
5. "You Stepped Out of a Dream" from Ziegfeld Girl (Nacio Herb Brown, Gus Kahn) – 2:44
6. "Day In, Day Out" (Rube Bloom, Mercer) – 2:08

== Recording dates ==
From the liner notes for The Voice of Romance: The Columbia Original Album Collection:

- March 27, 1957 — "Early Autumn", "In the Wee Small Hours of the Morning", "It Could Happen to You", "Let Me Love You"
- March 28, 1957 — "All Through the Night", "Will I Find My Love Today?", "Year After Year", "You Stepped Out of a Dream"
- April 1, 1957 — "Day In, Day Out", "Looking at You", "That Old Black Magic", "Too Close for Comfort"

== Personnel ==
- Johnny Mathis – vocals
- George Avakian – producer
- Percy Faith – arranger (except as noted); conductor
- Bob Prince – arranger ("Day In, Day Out", "Looking at You", "Too Close for Comfort")
- Jimmy Abato – alto sax
- Ernie Royal – trumpet
- Normand Menard – photography

== Bibliography ==
- Whitburn, Joel (2010), Joel Whitburn Presents Top Pop Albums, Seventh Edition, Record Research Inc., ISBN 0-89820-183-7
- Hoffmann, Frank W (1988), The Cash box album charts, 1955-1974, Scarecrow Press, ISBN 0-810-82005-6
