= Johnny Hartman, Johnny Hartman =

Studio album by Johnny Hartman
- Released: March 1977
- Recorded: May 17, 1976
- Venue: New York City
- Studio: Record Plant
- Genre: Jazz
- Length: 32:13
- Label: Musicor Records
- Producer: Gene Novello

Johnny Hartman chronology
I've Been There (1973)	Johnny Hartman, Johnny Hartman (1977)	Once in Every Life (1981)

Johnny Hartman, Johnny Hartman is a studio album by American singer Johnny Hartman, released in 1977 by Musicor Records. Gene Novello produced the record and co-wrote all of the songs. Fred Norman served as arranger and conductor. The title of the album is a play on Mary Hartman, Mary Hartman, the satirical television series popular at the time.

== Reception ==
Professional ratings
Review scores
Source	Rating
AllMusic	2/5 stars
The Penguin Guide to Jazz	2.5/5 stars

Upon its release, the album received mixed reviews. Billboard selected it as one of their "Recommended LPs for Jazz," , and said, "Hartman swings into this album, then mellows into his usual clear, smooth vocal style.... Strong string and horn sections compliment this album." The review listed "Starting Now," "Suzanne," "Onery Little Critter," and "Hello Mrs. Jones" as "Best Cuts."

Music critic Robert Palmer, writing in Record World, said, "Johnny Hartman isn't as confused as Mary, but 'Johnny Hartman, Johnny Hartman' plays on the title of the popular television series nonetheless. This Musicor release ... doesn't really do Hartman justice, although he is in excellent voice."

Dave Nathan at AllMusic reviewed the 1996 reissue, titled The Many Moods of Johnny Hartman, writing: "Hartman tries, but even his talent cannot save this material... [He] is reduced to warbling (literally) a set of inane tunes composed by Gene Novello... Not only are the songs mundane, but the arrangements are cloying and the performances, with the exception of Hartman's voice, uninspired and gimmicky." Nathan does offer a positive comment: "The one track which is a cut above the others is a catchy 'I've Only Myself to Blame,' which features some very good alto by an unidentified player. It is the only one which Hartman seems to enjoy doing." The review incorrectly states that the album had never been previously released after it was recorded in 1976.

== Reissues ==
According to Gregg Akkerman, Hartman's biographer, the master tapes of Johnny Hartman, Johnny Hartman were sold after Musicor went out of business in 1978, and the album has been "repackaged and retitled for unsuspecting Hartman fans several times after his death." Some reissues incorrectly claim that the material was previously unreleased. "It is rather implausible that all the parties concerned had no idea that the album had already been released in the late 70s." Titles of the reissues include: The Many Moods of Johnny Hartman (1996), Johnny Hartman Sings the Songs of Paul Greenwood and Gene Novello (1997), and You Came a Long Way from St. Louis (2003).

== Track listing ==
=== Side 1 ===
1. "Starting Now" (Paul Greenwood, Gene Novello) – 4:53
2. "When" (Sammy Cahn, Novello) – 4:43
3. "Suzanne" (Greenwood, Novello) – 5:06
4. "That's What Makes a House a Home" (Greenwood, Novello) – 3:57

=== Side 2 ===
1. "Ornery Little Critters" (Greenwood, Novello) – 2:58
2. "If I Could Only See You Again" (Novello) – 2:58
3. "Hello Mrs. Jones" (Greenwood, Novello) – 4:08
4. "I've Only Myself to Blame" (Greenwood, Novello) – 3:30

== Personnel ==
1. Johnny Hartman – vocals
2. Fred Norman - arranger, conductor
3. Gene Novello – producer
4. Craig Bishop – engineer
