= I Love Everybody (Johnny Hartman album) =

Studio album by Johnny Hartman
- Released: April 1967
- Recorded: September 27–28, 1966
- Venue: Los Angeles
- Studio: Western Recorders (Hollywood, California)
- Genre: Jazz
- Length: 32:00
- Label: ABC Records
- Producer: Bob Thiele

Johnny Hartman chronology
Unforgettable Songs by Johnny Hartman (1966)	I Love Everybody (1967)	Today (1972)

Professional ratings
Review scores
Source	Rating
AllMusic	4/5 stars
The Penguin Guide to Jazz Recordings	3/4 stars

I Love Everybody is a studio album by American jazz vocalist Johnny Hartman, released in 1967 by ABC Records. It was produced by Bob Thiele and features arrangements and conducting by Jack Pleis and Oliver Nelson.

Side One consists of six ballads performed by an orchestra, with string arrangements by Pleis. Side Two features a big band, arranged and conducted by Nelson, in a faux-live setting, with audience noise added afterwards to the studio recordings.

According to Hartman biographer Gregg Akkerman, ABC wasn't sure what to name the album, listing it at one point as Soul in the Night and even assigning it a catalog number of 574. ABC eventually gave that title to another artist. "The label finally came up with the title I Love Everybody, but the nonexistent ABC-574 has misled many Hartman fans to believe an entire unreleased album may exist. It does not."

I Love Everybody was the last of five Hartman albums produced by Bob Thiele for ABC and its jazz subsidiary Impulse!. When the album failed commercially upon its release in 1967, Hartman was let go by the company. He would not record again until 1972.

In 2005, Gambit Records reissued all of the material from the album on a compact disc entitled Johnny Hartman and Oliver Nelson: I Love Everybody, but with the original two sides of the LP in reverse order, along with additional material from 1958. Impulse! released Side Two of I Love Everybody on the 1995 CD Unforgettable, which also included the entirety of Unforgettable Songs by Johnny Hartman (1966), his other LP for ABC.

== Reception ==
AllMusic awards I Love Everybody four stars, and reviewer Mark Richardson lauds Hartman's "incredible voice." He praises the choice of songs on Side One but considers Side Two better overall. "The two sides of I Love Everybody seem like separate mini-albums, but both are strong and offer a good showcase for Hartman's impressive vocal technique."

Music critic Will Friedwald says, "a couple of cuts and arrangements on [Everybody] are below Hartman's usual standard." He calls Pleis' arrangements on Side One "a trifle jukeboxy," and says "the beat is rather businesslike," but he considers the six ballads "superior pop music" and praises "I Cover the Waterfront" as "a particularly tasty Pleis chart that includes the verse."

In his Hartman biography, Akkerman writes, "I Love Everybody could have been a pretty good crooner-based pop album, or a pretty good big-band-with-vocal album, but instead, the producer tried to have it both ways and unify the disparate parts by collectively drowning the whole thing in a reverb chamber."

== Track listing ==
=== Side 1 ===
1. "If I Had You" (Jimmy Campbell, Reg Connelly, Ted Shapiro) – 2:41
2. "When I Get The Time" (Hugo & Luigi, George David Weiss) – 2:47
3. "Goodbye, Goodbye" (David MacKechnie, David Dillon) – 2:22
4. "I Cover The Waterfront" (Johnny Green, Edward Heyman – 3:34
5. "Go Away" (Harold Spina, Don Robertson) – 2:40
6. "As You Desire Me" (Allie Wrubel) – 2:42

=== Side 2 ===
1. "Today I Love Everybody" (Harold Arlen, Dorothy Fields) – 2:40
2. "T'Aint No Need" (Nat Jones) – 3:11
3. "For The Want of a Kiss" (Redd Evans, Sol Winkler) – 3:00
4. "Girl Talk" (Neal Hefti, Bobby Troup) – 3:02
5. "Old Black Magic / Matilda" (Johnny Mercer, Arlen / Norman Span) – 3:16

== Personnel ==
- Johnny Hartman – vocals
- Bob Thiele – producer

=== Side 1 ===
- Dave Grusin – piano, keyboards
- Dennis Budimir, Tommy Tedesco – guitar
- Max Bennett, Melvin Pollan – bass
- Alvin Stoller – drums, percussion
- Strings and eight-person choir
- Jack Pleis – arranger, conductor

=== Side 2 ===
- Mike Melvoin – piano
- Herb Ellis, Howard Roberts – guitar
- Joe Mondragon – double bass
- Shelly Manne – drums
- James R. Lockert – percussion
- Conte Candoli, Oliver Mitchell, Al Porcino – trumpet
- Michael Barone, Billy Byers – trombone
- William E. Green, Plas Johnson – tenor saxophone
- Bill Hood – baritone saxophone
- Gabriel Baltazar – alto saxophone
- Oliver Nelson – arranger, conductor
