= Songs from the Heart (Johnny Hartman album) =

Studio album by Johnny Hartman
- Released: 1956
- Recorded: Late Oct/Early Nov, 1955
- Venue: New York City
- Genre: Jazz
- Length: 56:27
- Labels: Bethlehem; BCP 43
- Producer: Red Clyde

Johnny Hartman chronology
Songs from the Heart (1956)	All of Me: The Debonair Mr. Hartman (1957)

Songs from the Heart is an album by jazz singer Johnny Hartman. Bethlehem recorded it in 1955 and released it in 1956. It was Hartman's debut album and is from his middle period between his time as a singer in front of a band and his later, well deserved fame for his work on the Impulse label. The album was reissued in 2000 with six additional tracks, alternate takes of songs from the original album.

== Reception ==
Professional ratings
Review scores
Source	Rating
Allmusic	4.5/5 stars

John Bush reviewed Songs from the Heart for Allmusic and wrote that the album was "...a set of tender ballads, each word of which is treasured by Hartman's expansive, evocative voice." Bush described Hartman's musical support as "...soft, spare, and completely supportive".

== Track listing ==
1. "What Is There to Say?" (Vernon Duke, E.Y. "Yip" Harburg) – 2:52
2. "Ain't Misbehavin'" (Harry Brooks, Andy Razaf, Fats Waller) – 2:50
3. "I Fall in Love Too Easily" (Sammy Cahn, Jule Styne) – 2:26
4. "We'll Be Together Again" (Carl T. Fischer, Frankie Laine) – 3:03
5. "Down in the Depths (On the Ninetieth Floor)" (Cole Porter) – 3:01
6. "They Didn't Believe Me" (Jerome Kern, Herbert Reynolds) – 2:36
7. "I'm Glad There Is You" (Jimmy Dorsey, Paul Mertz) – 2:32
8. "When Your Lover Has Gone" (Einar A. Swan) – 3:10
9. "I'll Remember April" (Gene DePaul, Patricia Johnston, Don Raye) – 3:12
10. "I See Your Face Before Me" (Howard Dietz, Arthur Schwartz) – 3:34
11. "September Song" (Maxwell Anderson, Kurt Weill) – 3:52
12. "Moonlight in Vermont" (John Blackburn, Karl Suessdorf) – 3:08

Alternate takes released on 2000 CD reissue

13. "Down in the Depths" – 3:01
14. "They Didn't Believe Me" – 2:43
15. "I'm Glad There Is You" – 2:38
16. "I'll Remember April" – 3:43
17. "I See Your Face Before Me" – 4:10
18. "September Song" – 3:56

== Personnel ==
- Johnny Hartman – vocals
- Howard McGhee – trumpet
- Ralph Sharon – piano
- Jay Cave – bass
- Christy Febbo – drums
