= And I Thought About You (Johnny Hartman album) =

Studio album by Johnny Hartman
- Released: March 1959
- Recorded: Dec 1958 or Jan 1959
- Venue: New York City
- Genre: Vocal jazz
- Length: 32:51
- Label: Roost
- Producer: Teddy Reig

Johnny Hartman chronology
Johnny Hartman Sings...Just You, Just Me (1957)	And I Thought About You (1959)	John Coltrane and Johnny Hartman (1963)

Professional ratings
Review scores
Source	Rating
Allmusic	3.5/5 stars
The Penguin Guide to Jazz	3.5/4 stars

And I Thought About You is a studio album by American jazz singer Johnny Hartman, released in 1959 by Roost Records. Teddy Reig, owner of Roost, served as producer, and Rudy Traylor did the arrangements. It was the only album Hartman managed to record between December 1956 and his session with John Coltrane in March 1963.

== Reception ==
Scott Yanow, reviewing the album at AllMusic, calls Hartman "one of the warmest ballad singers of this century" and says, "his deep baritone voice is well showcased on this 1958 date, which emphasizes slower tempos." Yanow highlights the tracks "To Each His Own," "Little Girl Blue" and "There's a Lull in My Life," stating that Hartman is in "fine form."

Hartman biographer Gregg Akkerman calls And I Thought About You "an exquisite album" and claims "it contained some of Hartman's best work." Though the album prominently features ballads, Akkerman states that "The take of 'After You've Gone' serves as a reminder that the jazz saxophone section is one of the greatest American contributions to world music and proof that Hartman was capable of swinging with the best." Akkerman also notes that "Little Girl Blue" was "a song Hartman thoroughly enjoyed, as it stayed on his working set list the rest of his life."

When the album was released in 1959, Billboard magazine wrote, "Warm, rich baritone by Hartman on a set of standards with romantic [orchestral] support.... The artist has a distinctive sound."

== Track listing ==
=== Side 1 ===
1. "Mam'selle" (Edmund Goulding, Mack Gordon) – 2:33
2. "To Each His Own" (Jay Livingston, Ray Evans) – 2:50
3. "Sunday" (Chester Conn, Benny Krueger, Ned Miller, Jule Styne) – 2:15
4. "Alone" (Arthur Freed, Nacio Herb Brown) – 2:22
5. "Long Ago and Far Away" (Jerome Kern, Ira Gershwin) – 2:47
6. "I Should Care" ( Axel Stordahl, Paul Weston, Sammy Cahn) – 3:15

=== Side 2 ===
1. "Little Girl Blue" (Richard Rodgers, Lorenz Hart) – 3:03
2. "But Beautiful" (Jimmy Van Heusen, Johnny Burke) – 3:30
3. "After You've Gone" (Turner Layton, Henry Creamer) – 2:06
4. "There's a Lull in My Life" (Harry Revel, Gordon) – 3:13
5. "How Long Has This Been Going On?" (George Gershwin, I. Gershwin) – 2:42
6. "I Thought About You" (Van Heusen, Johnny Mercer) – 3:10

== Personnel ==
- Johnny Hartman – vocals
- Rudy Traylor – arranger
- Teddy Reig – producer
