= I Just Dropped by to Say Hello =

I Just Dropped By to Say Hello

Studio album by Johnny Hartman
- Released: 1964
- Recorded: October 9 & 17, 1963; Van Gelder Studio, Englewood Cliffs
- Genre: Vocal jazz
- Length: 33:09
- Label: Impulse! A-57
- Producer: Bob Thiele

Johnny Hartman chronology
John Coltrane and Johnny Hartman (1963)	I Just Dropped By to Say Hello (1964)	The Voice That Is! (1965)

Professional ratings
Review scores
Source	Rating
Allmusic	4.5/5 stars
The Rolling Stone Jazz Record Guide	4/5 stars
The Penguin Guide to Jazz	3.5/4 stars

I Just Dropped by to Say Hello is a studio album by jazz singer Johnny Hartman, released by Impulse! Records in 1964. It was the second of three albums Hartman recorded for Impulse!, and followed John Coltrane and Johnny Hartman, recorded a few months earlier.

== Track listing ==
1. "Charade (from Charade)" (Henry Mancini, Johnny Mercer) – 2:38
2. "In the Wee Small Hours of the Morning" (Bob Hilliard, David Mann) – 2:49
3. "A Sleepin' Bee" (Harold Arlen, Truman Capote) – 2:15
4. "Don't You Know I Care (Or Don't You Care to Know)" (Mack David, Duke Ellington) – 4:14
5. "Kiss & Run" (Rene Denoncin, William Engvick, Jack Ledru) – 3:35
6. "If I'm Lucky" (Eddie DeLange, Josef Myrow) – 2:52
7. "I Just Dropped by to Say Hello" (Sid Feller, Rick Ward) – 4:10
8. "Stairway to the Stars" (Matty Malneck, Mitchell Parish, Frank Signorelli) – 3:09
9. "Our Time" (Stanley Glick, Johnny Hartman) – 3:00
10. "Don't Call It Love" (Ronnell Bright) – 2:07
11. "How Sweet It Is to Be in Love" (George Cardini, Danny DiMinno) – 2:20

Tracks 1, 6 recorded on October 9, 1963; the remainder on October 17, 1963.

== Personnel ==
- Johnny Hartman - vocals
- Illinois Jacquet - tenor saxophone
- Kenny Burrell - guitar (tracks 2–5, 7–11)
- Jim Hall - guitar (tracks 1, 6)
- Hank Jones - piano
- Milt Hinton - double bass
- Elvin Jones - drums
