= Thank You for Everything =

Studio album by Johnny Hartman
- Released: 1998
- Recorded: Mid 1976
- Venue: Lexington, SC
- Studio: Dick Phipps' Music Room
- Genre: Vocal Jazz
- Length: 69:30
- Label: Audiophile
- Producers: Dick Phipps, George H. Buck Jr.

Johnny Hartman chronology
| For Trane (1995) | Thank You for Everything (1998) |

Professional ratings
Review scores
| Source | Rating |
|---|---|
| AllMusic | 4/5 stars |
| The Penguin Guide to Jazz | 3/4 stars |
| The Virgin Encyclopedia of Jazz | 3/5 stars |

Thank You for Everything is a studio album by American jazz vocalist Johnny Hartman, released in 1998 by Audiophile Records. The material was originally recorded in mid-1976 for two episodes of Alec Wilder's National Public Radio series entitled American Popular Song. Each episode focused on one composer, and Hartman chose works by Billy Strayhorn (originally broadcast November 7, 1976) and Cole Porter (originally broadcast March 13, 1977). Most of the songs from the two episodes are included on Thank You for Everything and marked the first time they had been commercially released.

== Reception ==
Scott Yanow at AllMusic gave the album four out of five stars, writing "Fifty-five at the time, Hartman was still in prime form, as he shows throughout the lengthy set of ballads. [...] [H]ighlights include 'I'm Glad There Is You,' 'Easy To Love,' two versions of 'Warm Valley' and a remake of 'Lush Life.'" Yanow also notes that Hartman is "tastefully accompanied by pianist Loonis McGlohon."

The Penguin Guide to Jazz said the recordings "find an older-sounding Hartman in very good form."

Hartman's biographer Gregg Akkerman calls the Cole Porter material from the second broadcast "the stronger of the two episodes. By this point in the original session, Hartman was firing on all cylinders and turned in excellent renditions of both familiar and lesser-known works."

== Track listing ==
1. "I'm Glad There Is You" (Jimmy Dorsey, Paul Madeira) – 2:58
2. "What Is This Thing Called Love?" (Cole Porter) – 1:50
3. "The Morning After" (John Weiner, Robert Sour) – 3:37
4. "I Concentrate on You" (Porter) – 2:52
5. "Take the "A" Train" (Billy Strayhorn) – 4:40
6. "Miss Otis Regrets" (Porter) – 3:29
7. "Thank You For Everything (Lotus Blossom)" (Strayhorn, Edmund Anderson) – 2:51
8. "Anything Goes" (Porter) – 3:04
9. "Lush Life" (Strayhorn) – 4:06
10. "You Better Know It" (Strayhorn, Duke Ellington) – 1:46
11. "Easy To Love" (Porter) – 2:43
12. "Warm Valley" (Larry Carr, Ellington) – 1:59
13. "Warm Valley" (Bob Russell, Ellington) – 2:05
14. "Just One of Those Things" (Porter) – 1:54
15. "My Little Brown Book" (Strayhorn) – 3:22
16. "Let's Do It, Let's Fall in Love" (Porter) – 3:03
17. "While We're Young" (Alec Wilder, Morty Palitz, Bill Engvick) – 2:50
18. "I've Got You Under My Skin" (Porter) – 3:39
19. "Satin Doll" (Strayhorn, Ellington, Johnny Mercer) – 3:00
20. "Ev'ry Time We Say Goodbye" (Porter) – 3:42

Recorded in Dick Phipps' Music Room, Lake Murray, Lexington, South Carolina in mid-1976.

== Personnel ==
1. Johnny Hartman - vocals
2. Loonis McGlohon - piano, arranger, liner notes
3. Terry Lassiter - bass
4. James Lackey - drums

=== Technical ===
1. Dick Phipps - producer, music director
2. George H. Buck Jr. - producer of compact disc
3. William D. Hay - engineer
