= Plays and Plays and... =

Studio album by Dave Brubeck
- Released: Mid October 1957
- Recorded: February 8, 1957; Dave Brubeck Home, Oakland
- Genre: Jazz
- Length: 38:00
- Label: Fantasy; F 3259

Dave Brubeck chronology
Jazz Impressions of the U.S.A. (1956)	Plays and Plays and... (1957)	Dave Digs Disney (1957)

Professional ratings
Review scores
Source	Rating
AllMusic	2.5/5 stars
The Penguin Guide to Jazz	3/4 stars

Plays and Plays and... is a jazz album by pianist Dave Brubeck. It's Brubeck's second solo piano album (the first being Brubeck Plays Brubeck). It was originally released on Fantasy Records in 1957. The cover artwork was created by Arnold Roth.

Plays and Plays and... mainly features old standards, most of which improvised on the spot, or rehearsed roughly. "To me," Brubeck says, "improvisation is the core of the jazz. [...] Only through improvisation jazz is going to survive. When there is not complete freedom of the soloist, it ceases to be jazz." "Sweet Cleo Brown", one of the two Brubeck originals on the album, is dedicated to pianist Cleo Patra Brown, who had a great influence on him. Brubeck first met her in 1941, during a performance in a club. "She had the fastest left hand I've ever heard, except for Tatum's. [...] It was mostly from her I learned the importance of the left hand fulfilling the role of the string bass." Brubeck's favourite piece on Plays and Plays and... is "Imagination".

== Track listing ==
1. "Sweet Cleo Brown" (Dave Brubeck) - 3:56
2. "I'm Old Fashioned" (Jerome Kern, Johnny Mercer) - 5:00
3. "Love Is Here to Stay" (George Gershwin, Ira Gershwin) - 2:51
4. "Indian Summer" (Victor Herbert, Al Dubin) - 3:51
5. "In Search of a Theme" (Brubeck) - 2:29
6. "You'd Be So Nice to Come Home To" (Cole Porter) - 2:29
7. "I See Your Face Before Me" (Howard Dietz, Arthur Schwartz) - 4:58
8. "They Say It's Wonderful" (Irving Berlin) - 2:43
9. "Imagination" (Jimmy Van Heusen, Johnny Burke) - 6:12
10. "Two Sleepy People" (Carmichael, Loesser) - 3:31 Bonus track on CD

== Personnel ==
- Dave Brubeck - piano
