= Down in the Depths (On the Ninetieth Floor) =

"Down in the Depths (on the Ninetieth Floor)" is a torch song written by Cole Porter, for his 1936 musical Red, Hot and Blue, in which it was introduced by Ethel Merman. The lyric scheme juxtaposes images of high and low. It is a lament from the point of view of a rich woman in a penthouse apartment higher than any building but the Empire State Building, who looks down on the busy city life below her but nevertheless feels she is at the lowest and poorest point of her life because she is lonely. Porter's melody is musically intertwined with the lyric scheme in a similar manner to his song "Ev'ry Time We Say Goodbye."

The song was a late addition to the show only being added during the Boston tryout.

== Notable recordings ==
- Sylvia Syms - Songs By Sylvia Syms (1952)
- Johnny Hartman - Songs from the Heart (1956)
- Ella Fitzgerald - Ella Loves Cole (1972), Newport Jazz Festival: Live at Carnegie Hall (1973)
- Lisa Stansfield recorded "Down in the Depths" for Red Hot + Blue, a 1990 Cole Porter tribute album in aid of HIV/AIDS awareness.
- Tony Bennett included the song in his album Here's to the Ladies (1995)

== Popular culture ==
- In Mart Crowley's 1968 play The Boys in the Band one of the gay characters refers to the song as "the gay national anthem."
