= Nick Catalano =

American academic

Dr. Nick Catalano is an American university educator and author. He is a professor of Literature and Music at Pace University in Pleasantville, New York.

He is director of the university's Performing Arts Music and Literature Program. In addition, he is a music columnist (Allaboutjazz.com), book reviewer (The Internet Review of Books), contributing editor to Arts&Opinion magazine, and a writer/producer of documentaries for film and television (Greece [1990], The Hamptons [1991]).

== Author ==
- Clifford Brown: The Life and Art of the Legendary Jazz Trumpeter (Oxford University Press, ISBN 0-19-514400-7)
- New York Nights (Auburndale 2009), a book about writing, performing and producing in New York City
- A New Yorker at Sea (Aegeon Press 2012), his account of participating in an around-the-world sailing trip.
- Tales of a Hamptons Sailor (Aegeon Press 2015), stories of The Hamptons in the 80's, and a circumnavigation
- Scribble from the Apple (Aegeon Press 2019), essays on music, politics, culture, philosophy, art, and The Holocaust.

== Personal ==
Catalano maintains residences in New York City, East Hampton NY, and Delray Beach, Florida.
