= Little Satchmo =

Documentary on the daughter of Louis Armstrong

- Directed by: John Alexander
- Written by: John Alexander, Sharon Preston-Folta
- Produced by: JC Guest, Lea Umberger
- Starring: Sharon Preston-Folta
- Edited by: John Alexander
- Music by: Eddie Korvin
- Production companies: Crook & Nanny Productions
- Distributed by: PBS
- Release date: 2022
- Country: United States
- Language: English

Little Satchmo is a 2022 documentary film about Louis Armstrong's secret daughter, Sharon Preston-Folta. The film is distributed by PBS International and won an EMMY Award (2023 Outstanding Historical Documentary, Southeast). It is directed by John Alexander and produced by Lea Umberger and JC Guest. It is based on the memoir of Sharon Preston-Folta, the only child of Louis Armstrong whom he himself acknowledged.
