= Ken Burns Jazz: John Coltrane =

Compilation album by John Coltrane
- Released: 2000-11-07
- Recorded: September 10, 1956 – February 22, 1967
- Genre: Jazz
- Label: Verve

Professional ratings
Review scores
Source	Rating
Allmusic	4/5 stars
And It Don't Stop	(3-star Honorable Mention)

Ken Burns Jazz: John Coltrane is a compilation album by jazz musician John Coltrane. It is part of a series of tie-in compilations from various labels to the PBS miniseries Ken Burns Jazz.

== Track listing ==
1. "’Round Midnight" (Cootie Williams; Thelonious Monk; Bernie Hanighen) – 5:58
2. "Mr. P.C." (John Coltrane) – 7:00
3. "Naima" (John Coltrane) – 4:23
4. "My Favorite Things" (Richard Rodgers; Oscar Hammerstein II) – 13:44
5. "Chasing the Trane" (John Coltrane) – 16:04
6. "In a Sentimental Mood" (Irving Mills; Duke Ellington; Manny Kurtz) – 4:16
7. "Afro Blue" (Mongo Santamaria) – 8:09
8. "Alabama" (John Coltrane) – 5:11
9. "A Love Supreme: Part I: Acknowledgement" (John Coltrane) – 7:48
10. "Jupiter" (John Coltrane) – 5:22
