= Bob Mover =

American jazz saxophonist and vocalist

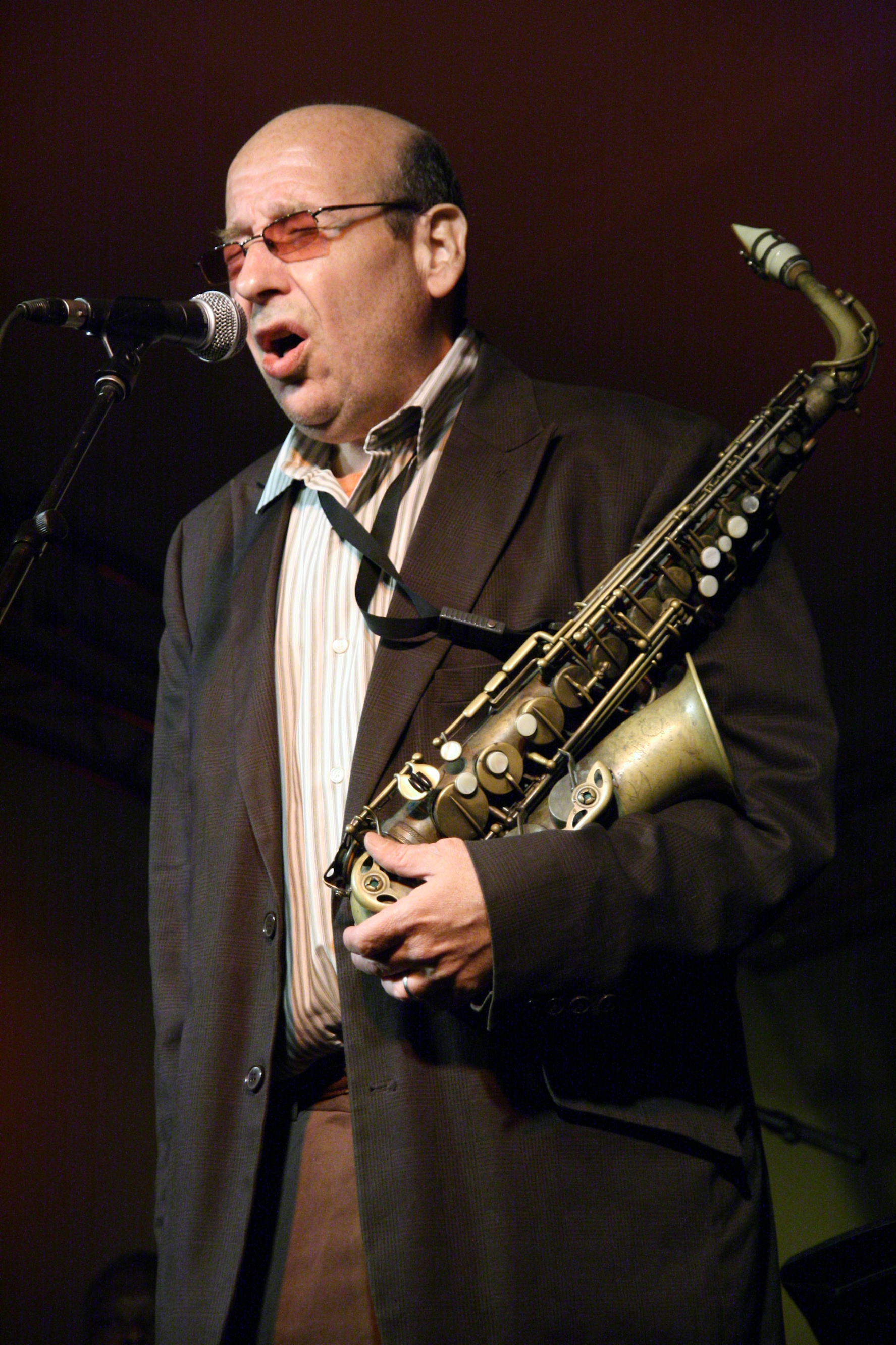
- Bob Mover performing at Ghent Jazz Festival in 2008

Background information
- Born: 1952 (age 73–74); Boston, Massachusetts
- Genres: Jazz
- Occupation: Musician
- Instrument: Saxophone

Bob Mover (born 1952) is an alto, tenor and soprano jazz saxophonist and a vocalist. He has been described as "the highly respected and extraordinary alto saxophonist, teacher, and theoretician".

== Early years and education ==
His father, Jim Mover was a trumpet player who played professionally including stints with the Charlie Spivak and Tommy Dorsey orchestras, as well as leading his own big band in the Boston area. When the family moved to Miami, Bob started playing the saxophone at age 13. At this time, he came under the mentorship of the great Ira Sullivan. He studied with Phil Woods at a summer music camp at 15. Before the age of 20, he had established important relationships with Lee Konitz,Sonny Rollins and Zoot Sims.

== Career ==
In 1973, at the age of 21, Mover was a sideman for Charles Mingus for a five-month period at New York City's 5 Spot Café. By 1975 Mover was working regularly in New York City jazz clubs with Chet Baker, and he made his first European appearances with Baker at La Grande Parade du Jazz in (Nice, France), Jazz Festival Laren (the Netherlands), and the Middelheim Jazz Festival (Antwerp, Belgium).

In late 1975, Mover started leading his own groups around the New York area and made his first two albums as a leader in 1976 and 1977: On the Move (Choice) and Bob Mover (Vanguard). Weekly gigs at the Sweet Basil in Greenwich Village included Tom Harrell, Jimmy Garrison, Kenny Barron, Albert Dailey, Ben Riley, Mike Nock, and Ron McCLure.

In 1977, he was teaching; students included Russ Gershon.

Mover reunited with Chet Baker in 1981 for a European tour, playing in France, Belgium, Netherlands, Austria, and Germany, where they recorded Chet Baker Live at Club Salt Peanuts Koln, Volumes 1 and 2 (Circle). Mover recorded two more albums as a leader in 1981 and 1982, In the True Tradition and Things Unseen, both issued by Xanadu.

In 1983, he moved to Montreal and taught at Concordia University (Quebec). Three years later he recorded his fifth album as leader, The Nightbathers, with pianist Paul Bley and guitarist John Abercrombie, which was an experiment in free improvisation. From 1987 to 1997, Mover lived in Toronto and toured Europe with pianists Walter Davis Jr. and Tony Castillano. With Don Thompson and Archie Alleyne, he helped found the Toronto Jazz Quartet. He accepted a teaching position at York University, giving saxophone master classes and teaching a course called "Musicianship for Jazz Singers". Mover released another album as leader called You Go to My Head with Rufus Reid, Benny Green, Victor Lewis and Steve Hall. He released an album recorded in Montreal in 1997 called Television (DSM) featuring John Hicks and Jake Wilkinson.

== Discography ==
=== As leader ===
- Bob Mover (Vanguard, 1978)
- On the Move (Choice, 1978)
- In the True Tradition (Xanadu, 1981)
- Things Unseen! (Xanadu, 1983)
- The Night Bathers (Justin Time, 1986)
- You Go to My Head (Bellaphon/Jazz City, 1989)
- Yesterdays (Jazzette, 1996)
- Television (DSM, 1997)
- It Amazes Me... (Zoho, 2008)
- My Heart Tells Me (Motema, 2013)

=== As sideman ===
- Dolo Coker, Anniversary (Xanadu, 1985)
- Walter Davis Jr., Illumination (Bellaphon/Jazz City, 1988)
- Steve Holt, The Lion's Eyes (Plug, 1983)
- Lee Konitz, Affinity (Chiaroscuro, 1977)
- Gianni Lenoci, Old Ground, New Ground (Modern Times, 1993)
- Players Association, The Players Association (Vanguard, 1977)
- Players Association, Turn the Music Up! (Vanguard, 1979)
- Ken Skinner, Maroon (Village Jazz, 1998)
