= Eddie Korvin =

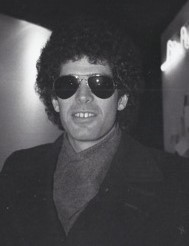
- Eddie Korvin at Blue Rock Studio reception area, c. 1975

Background information
- Born: New York City, New York, US
- Occupations: Recording engineer, mixer, editor, studio owner, music producer, arranger, composer
- Labels: Various

Edouard "Eddie" Korvin (born 1945) is an American recording engineer, composer, and music producer.

Korvin co-composed the score for the Emmy Award-winning documentary series This Was America alongside Ron Frangipane.

== Early years ==
Korvin was born in New York City in 1945 and raised in the Manhattan area. His stepfather was actor Charles Korvin.

Family friends and acquaintances in the music field included composers Burton Lane and Johnny Mercer, singer Anita Ellis, conductor Ted Saidenberg, violinist Issac Stern, bass-baritone George London, record store owner, Sam Goody, Arturo Toscanini, and Murray the K.

== Blue Rock Studio ==
Korvin owned the Blue Rock Studio from 1970 to 1986. The studio was located in SoHo, Manhattan.

Blue Rock Studio was intentionally created as a one-room-only facility.

== Work in television and film ==
Korvin began composing music commercially around 1980, scoring for projects in film, television and commercials. In 1982, he won an Emmy Award for scoring an episode of the documentary series, “This Was America”. Working with film director David Sutherland, a former classmate at Tufts University, Korvin was composer and assistant director for the film Jack Levine: A Feast Of Pure Reason. Other scoring projects included two more films with Sutherland for PBS as well as shows for HBO, Cinemax and an ABC TV Christmas special. Still active today, he has worked with director John Alexander as music supervisor on Bender and on Little Satchmo as assistant director, music supervisor, and composer. In 2023, he won a second Emmy for his work on Little Satchmo. In 2024, in partnership with his son, Edouard Korvin, he opened a post production audio facility, Studio 26, in Santa Monica, CA and completed music and sound design on a feature documentary, God As My Witness, directed by Lindsay Q. Pitre.
