= John Coltrane and Johnny Hartman =

1963 album by John Coltrane and Johnny Hartman

Studio album by John Coltrane and Johnny Hartman
- Released: July or August 1963
- Recorded: March 7, 1963
- Studio: Van Gelder (Englewood Cliffs)
- Genre: Jazz
- Length: 31:11
- Labels: Impulse! A-40
- Producer: Bob Thiele

John Coltrane chronology
Stardust (1963)	John Coltrane and Johnny Hartman (1963)	Live at Birdland (1964)

Johnny Hartman chronology
And I Thought About You (1959)	John Coltrane and Johnny Hartman (1963)	I Just Dropped by to Say Hello (1963)

Professional ratings
Review scores
Source	Rating
AllMusic	5/5 stars
The Baltimore Sun	(favourable)
The Encyclopedia of Popular Music	4/5 stars
The Penguin Guide to Jazz	3/4 stars
The Rolling Stone Jazz Record Guide	5/5 stars

John Coltrane and Johnny Hartman is a studio album by saxophonist John Coltrane and vocalist Johnny Hartman which was released through Impulse! Records in July or August 1963. It was inducted into the Grammy Hall of Fame in 2013.

== Background ==
Although it is often reported that Coltrane and Hartman had known each other since their days playing with Dizzy Gillespie's band in the late 1940s, their time in the band never overlapped. Coltrane may have heard Hartman sing at a 1950 Apollo Theater performance at which they shared the stage. Hartman is the only vocalist with whom the saxophonist recorded as a leader.

Initially, when producer Bob Thiele approached Hartman with Coltrane's request that the two record together, Hartman was hesitant, as he did not consider himself a jazz singer and did not think he and Coltrane would complement one another musically. However, Thiele encouraged Hartman to go to hear Coltrane perform at Birdland in New York City to see if they could work something out. Hartman did and after the club closed, he, Coltrane and Coltrane's pianist, McCoy Tyner, went over some songs together. On March 7, 1963, Coltrane and Hartman had decided on 10 songs for the record album, but en route to the studio they heard Nat King Cole on the radio performing "Lush Life", and Hartman immediately decided that song had to be included in their album.

== Recording and music ==
The album was recorded on March 7, 1963, at the Van Gelder Studio in Englewood Cliffs, New Jersey. Hartman later said that each song was done in only one take, except for "You Are Too Beautiful", which required two takes because Elvin Jones dropped one of his drumsticks during the first take.

Jazz writer Michael Cuscuna explains the speculation of two different versions of the album: "At a later date, Coltrane decided to overdub some additional obbligato saxophone phrases behind Hartman's vocals on 'My One and Only Love', 'Lush Life' and 'You Are Too Beautiful'. A new master was made by Rudy Van Gelder, who added some additional echo to the three tracks. Although the first release of the album used the original master without Coltrane's additional obbligatos, it was later substituted with the new master."

In 2005, the raw tapes were reviewed by jazz archivist Barry Kernfeld, who documented there were actually complete alternate takes for all six songs that he considered "absolutely riveting". Until clear ownership of these tapes is established between the Coltrane family and Universal Music, there are no plans for their release.

== Release and reception ==
The album was announced on July 6, 1963, in Billboard. Bob Thiele produced it and Impulse! released it toward the end of the month. It has become a classic ballad jazz album, and the renditions of "Lush Life", "My One and Only Love", and "They Say It's Wonderful" are considered definitive. Scott Yanow's five-star review for AllMusic describes the album as "essential for all jazz collections".

Kurt Elling recorded an album in 2009 Dedicated to You: Kurt Elling Sings the Music of Coltrane and Hartman in tribute to John Coltrane and Johnny Hartman.

== Track listing ==
Side one
No.	Title	Length
1.	"They Say It's Wonderful" (Irving Berlin)	5:20
2.	"Dedicated to You" (Sammy Cahn, Saul Chaplin, Hy Zaret)	5:32
3.	"My One and Only Love" (Guy Wood, Robert Mellin)	4:55

Side two
No.	Title	Length
4.	"Lush Life" (Billy Strayhorn)	5:29
5.	"You Are Too Beautiful" (Richard Rodgers, Lorenz Hart)	5:36
6.	"Autumn Serenade" (Peter DeRose, Sammy Gallop)	4:19

== Personnel ==
- Johnny Hartman – vocals
- John Coltrane – tenor saxophone
- McCoy Tyner – piano
- Jimmy Garrison – double bass
- Elvin Jones – drums

== Charts ==
Chart performance for John Coltrane and Johnny Hartman
Chart (2022)	Peak position
German Albums (Offizielle Top 100)	57
