= Johnny Hartman =

American jazz singer (1923–1983)

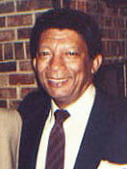
- Hartman at the Village Jazz Lounge in Walt Disney World

Background information
- Born: John Maurice Hartman; July 3, 1923; Houma, Louisiana, U.S.
- Died: September 15, 1983 (aged 60) New York City, U.S.
- Genre: Jazz
- Occupation: Singer
- Instruments: Vocals; piano
- Years active: 1946–1983
- Labels: RCA Victor; Bethlehem; Impulse!; ABC; Perception; Blue Note; Savoy
- Formerly of: Earl Hines; Marl Young; Dizzy Gillespie

John Maurice Hartman (July 3, 1923 – September 15, 1983) was an American jazz and pop singer known for his rich baritone voice and recordings of ballads. He sang and recorded with Earl Hines' and Dizzy Gillespie's big bands and with Erroll Garner. Hartman is best remembered for John Coltrane and Johnny Hartman, a landmark 1963 album for both him and saxophonist John Coltrane.

== Biography ==
Born to an African-American family in Louisiana and raised in Chicago, Hartman began singing and playing the piano by the age of eight. He attended DuSable High School studying music under Walter Dyett before receiving a scholarship to the Chicago Musical College. He sang as a private in the Army's Special Services during World War II, but his first professional break came in September 1946 when he won a singing contest at the Apollo Theater, earning him a one-week engagement with Earl Hines, which lasted a year. Hartman's first recordings were with Marl Young during that time, though it was his collaboration with Hines that gave him notable exposure. After the Hines orchestra broke up, Dizzy Gillespie invited Hartman to join his big band for an eight-week tour of California in 1948. After leaving Gillespie, Hartman worked for a short time with pianist Erroll Garner before beginning as a soloist early in 1950.

After recording several singles with different orchestras, Hartman finally made a breakthrough in 1956 with the release of his first solo album, Songs from the Heart, for Bethlehem Records, featuring a quartet led by trumpeter Howard McGhee. The album showcased Hartman's romantic and tender style of ballad singing. While these ballads were his bread and butter, he was also capable of swinging. For his next album, All of Me: The Debonair Mr. Hartman (1957), also for Bethlehem, he worked with Ernie Wilkins' orchestra and the Frank Hunter Strings. Most of the album's tracks are ballads, with a few up-tempo numbers including the title track and the song "The Birth of the Blues".

Releasing two more albums with small, independent labels, Hartman got a career-altering offer in 1963 to record with John Coltrane. The album from that session, John Coltrane and Johnny Hartman, is widely considered Hartman's best work. It is also Coltrane's only album with a singer. Its popularity led to Hartman recording four more albums with Impulse! Records and its parent label ABC, all produced by Bob Thiele, Coltrane's producer at Impulse!. Hartman was dubious when, at Coltrane's request, Thiele approached him about working with Coltrane. "I didn't know if John could play that kind of stuff I did," he told writer Frank Kofsky a decade later, "So I was a little reluctant at first. John was working at Birdland, and he asked me to come down there, and after hearing him play ballads the way he did, man, I said, 'Hey ..., beautiful.' So that's how we got together." After the club closed, Hartman, Coltrane, and Coltrane's pianist, McCoy Tyner, went over some songs together. Some time after the initial recordings, Coltrane returned to the studio to fill in some solo parts. The myth of additional tracks or alternate takes gained credibility when Impulse! released an early pressing of the album without Coltrane's additions. They quickly replaced that album with the completed versions but some people, having heard both pressings and noticing more saxophone in places, assumed they were hearing entirely different takes rather than the same takes with added tracks.

Coltrane was very much in favor of recording a third album of ballads at that time and specifically sought out Hartman. Later, in an interview with Frank Kofsky, he said,

"I just felt something about him; I don't know what it was. I like his sound, I thought there was something there I had to hear, so I looked him up and did that album."

By the mid-1960s, popular tastes were embracing rock and roll, and Hartman's style had much less commercial appeal. With the 1970s being difficult times for singers working from the Great American Songbook, Hartman turned to playing cocktail lounges in New York City and Chicago. He did a television special in Australia and recorded several albums in Japan, including a tribute to Coltrane after the saxophonist's death in 1967.

Recording with small, independent labels such as Perception and Musicor, Hartman produced music of mixed quality as he attempted to be viewed as a more versatile vocalist. Speaking about his approach to interpreting a song, he said, "Well, to me a lyric is a story, almost like talking, telling somebody a story, try to make it believable." When he returned to the jazz combo format of his earlier albums, Hartman recorded Once in Every Life for the Bee Hive label, which earned him a Grammy nomination for Best Male Jazz Vocalist in 1981. He quickly followed this up with his last album of new material, This One's for Tedi, a tribute to his wife, Theodora.

Hartman recorded new tracks for Grenadilla Records on their jazz label, Grapevine. These were dance tracks like "Beyond the Sea" and "Caravan", with the latter also having an extended six-minute version.

In the early 1980s, Hartman gave several performances at jazz festivals and for television and radio before succumbing to lung cancer at the age of 60. He died at the Memorial Sloan Kettering Cancer Center in New York City. More than a decade after he died, Clint Eastwood featured four songs from the then out-of-print album Once in Every Life for the dreamy, romantic scenes in The Bridges of Madison County (1995).

A biography, The Last Balladeer: The Johnny Hartman Story by Dr. Gregg Akkerman, was published in June 2012 by Scarecrow Press as part of their "Studies in Jazz" series.

== Personal life ==
Hartman had a brief first marriage that did not last. He later married Theodora ("Tedi") Boyd, a dancer and secretary. They had two daughters: Lori and Tedi. Lori Hartman is a minister of the United Methodist Church in New York City and a vocalist.

== Memorial ==
In 1984, the New York City Council designated the area formed by Amsterdam Avenue, Hamilton Place, and West 143rd Street in the Hamilton Heights neighborhood of Manhattan as Johnny Hartman Plaza.

== Discography ==
Sources:

- Dizzy Gillespie, The Complete RCA Victor Recordings (Bluebird, 1995) – four studio tracks with Gillespie's orchestra
- The Complete Regent Recordings (Disconforme / Jazz Factory, 2001) – plus three tracks from 1961 with Andrew Hill
- The Complete Bethlehem Sessions (Essential Jazz Classics, 2015) – both Bethlehem albums with extra tracks, the four studio sides with Dizzy Gillespie's Orchestra, the four Erroll Garner Trio singles, and the six singles with Earl Hines and His Orchestra
- First, Lasting & Always (Regent, 1947) – reissued in 1984 by Savoy
- Just You, Just Me (Regent, 1956) – reissued in 1984 by Savoy
- Songs from the Heart (Bethlehem, 1956)
- All of Me: The Debonair Mr. Hartman (Bethlehem, 1957)
- And I Thought About You (Roost, 1959)
- John Coltrane and Johnny Hartman (Impulse!, 1963)
- The Voice That Is! (Impulse!, 1964)
- I Just Dropped by to Say Hello (Impulse!, 1964)
- Unforgettable Songs by Johnny Hartman (ABC-Paramount, 1966)
- I Love Everybody (ABC, 1966)
- Today (Perception, 1972)
- Hartman Meets Hino (Capitol Music Japan, 1972)
- For Trane (Blue Note, 1972) – rel. 1995
- Hartman Sings Trane's Favorites (Capitol Music Japan, 1973)
- I've Been There (Perception, 1973)
- Johnny Hartman, Johnny Hartman (Musicor, 1977)
- Thank You for Everything (Audiophile, 1998) – privately recorded in 1978
- Once in Every Life (Bee Hive, 1980)
- This One's for Tedi (Audiophile, 1980)
