= 1960s in jazz =

In the 1960s in jazz, free jazz and the related form of avant-garde jazz broke through into an open space of "free tonality" in which meter, beat, and formal symmetry all disappeared, and a range of World music from India, Africa, and Arabia were melded into an intense, even religiously ecstatic or orgiastic style of playing. While loosely inspired by bebop, free jazz tunes gave players much more latitude; the loose harmony and tempo was deemed controversial when this approach was first developed. The bassist Charles Mingus is also frequently associated with the avant-garde in jazz, although his compositions draw from myriad styles and genres. The first major stirrings came in the 1950s, with the early work of Ornette Coleman and Cecil Taylor. In the 1960s, performers included John Coltrane, Archie Shepp, Sun Ra, Albert Ayler, Pharoah Sanders, and others. Free jazz quickly found a foothold in Europe– in part because musicians such as Ayler, Taylor, Steve Lacy and Eric Dolphy spent extended periods in Europe. A distinctive European contemporary jazz (often incorporating elements of free jazz but not limited to it) flourished also because of the emergence of musicians (such as John Surman, Zbigniew Namyslowski, Albert Mangelsdorff, Kenny Wheeler and Mike Westbrook) anxious to develop new approaches reflecting their national and regional musical cultures and contexts.

In the late 1960s, Latin jazz, combining rhythms from African and Latin American countries, often played on instruments such as conga, timbale, güiro, and claves, with jazz and classical harmonies played on typical jazz instruments (piano, double bass, etc.) broke through. There are two main varieties: Afro-Cuban jazz was played in the US right after the bebop period, while Brazilian jazz became more popular in the 1960s. Afro-Cuban jazz began as a movement in the mid-1950s as bebop musicians such as Dizzy Gillespie and Billy Taylor started Afro-Cuban bands influenced by such Cuban and Puerto Rican musicians as Xavier Cugat, Tito Puente, and Arturo Sandoval. Brazilian jazz such as bossa nova is derived from samba, with influences from jazz and other 20th-century classical and popular music styles. Bossa is generally moderately paced, with melodies sung in Portuguese or English. The style was pioneered by Brazilians João Gilberto and Antônio Carlos Jobim. The related term jazz-samba describes an adaptation of bossa nova compositions to the jazz idiom by American performers such as Stan Getz and Charlie Byrd.

Bossa nova was made popular by Elizete Cardoso's recording of Chega de Saudade on the Canção do Amor Demais LP, composed by Vinícius de Moraes (lyrics) and Antonio Carlos Jobim (music). The initial releases by Gilberto and the 1959 film Black Orpheus brought significant popularity in Brazil and elsewhere in Latin America, which spread to North America via visiting American jazz musicians. The resulting recordings by Charlie Byrd and Stan Getz cemented its popularity and led to a worldwide boom with 1963's Getz/Gilberto, numerous recordings by famous jazz performers such as Ella Fitzgerald (Ella Abraça Jobim) and Frank Sinatra (Francis Albert Sinatra & Antônio Carlos Jobim), and the entrenchment of the bossa nova style as a lasting influence in world music for several decades and even up to the present.

== 1960s jazz standards ==
=== 1960–1964 ===
Herbie Hancock emerged as an influential pianist in the 1960s both as a leader and as part of Miles Davis's "second great quintet". Later he became one of the most popular jazz fusion artists. Standards composed by him include "Watermelon Man" (1963), "Cantaloupe Island" (1964), "Maiden Voyage" (1965) and "Chameleon" (1973).

- 1961 – "Impressions". Composed by John Coltrane.
- 1963 – "Once I Loved" (a.k.a. "Amor em Paz", also "Love in Peace"). Composed by Antonio Carlos Jobim with lyrics by Vinicius de Moraes (Portuguese) and Ray Gilbert (English).
- 1961 – "One Note Samba" (a.k.a. "Samba de Uma Nota Só"). Composed by Antonio Carlos Jobim with lyrics by Newton Mendonça (Portuguese) and Antonio Carlos Jobim (English).
- 1961 – "Stolen Moments". Composed by Oliver Nelson.
- 1962 – "Corcovado" (a.k.a. "Quiet Nights of Quiet Stars"). Composed by Antonio Carlos Jobim with lyrics by Antonio Carlos Jobim (Portuguese) and Gene Lees (English).
- 1962 – "Days of Wine and Roses". Composed by Henry Mancini with lyrics by Johnny Mercer.
- 1962 – "Meditation" (a.k.a. "Meditação"). Composed by Antonio Carlos Jobim Newton Mendonça (Portuguese) Norman Gimbel (English).
- 1962 – "Up Jumped Spring". Composed by Freddie Hubbard.
- 1963 – "Blue Bossa". Composed by Kenny Dorham.
- 1963 – "Bluesette". Composed by Jean Thielemans with lyrics by Norman Gimbel.
- 1963 – "Four". Composed by Miles Davis.
- 1963 – "The Girl from Ipanema" (a.k.a. "Garôta de Ipanema"). Composed by Antonio Carlos Jobim with lyrics by Vinicius de Moraes (Portuguese) and Norman Gimbel (English).
- 1963 – "How Insensitive" (a.k.a. "Insensatez"). Composed by Antonio Carlos Jobim with lyrics by Vinicius de Moraes (Portuguese) and Norman Gimbel (English).
- 1963 – "If You Never Come to Me" (a.k.a. "Inútil Paisagem"). Composed by Antonio Carlos Jobim with lyrics by Aloysio de Oliveira (Portuguese) and Ray Gilbert (English).
- 1963 – "Oye Como Va". Written by Tito Puente.
- 1963 – "Recorda-Me". Composed by Joe Henderson.
- 1963 – "The Sidewinder". Composed by Lee Morgan.
- 1963 – "Só Danço Samba" (a.k.a. "Jazz 'N' Samba"). Composed by Antonio Carlos Jobim with lyrics by Vinicius de Moraes (Portuguese) and Norman Gimbel (English).
- 1963 – "St. Thomas". Composed by Sonny Rollins.
- 1963 – "Water to Drink" (a.k.a. "Água de Beber"). Composed by Antonio Carlos Jobim with lyrics by Vinicius de Moraes (Portuguese) and Norman Gimbel (English).
- 1963 – "Watermelon Man". Composed by Herbie Hancock.
- 1964 – "Cantaloupe Island". Composed by Herbie Hancock.
- 1964 – "Inner Urge". Composed by Joe Henderson.
- 1964 – "JuJu". Composed by Wayne Shorter.
- 1964 – "Mahjong". Composed by Wayne Shorter.
- 1964 – "Song for My Father". Composed by Horace Silver.
- 1964 – "Linus and Lucy, Composed by Vince Guaraldi.

=== 1965–1969 ===
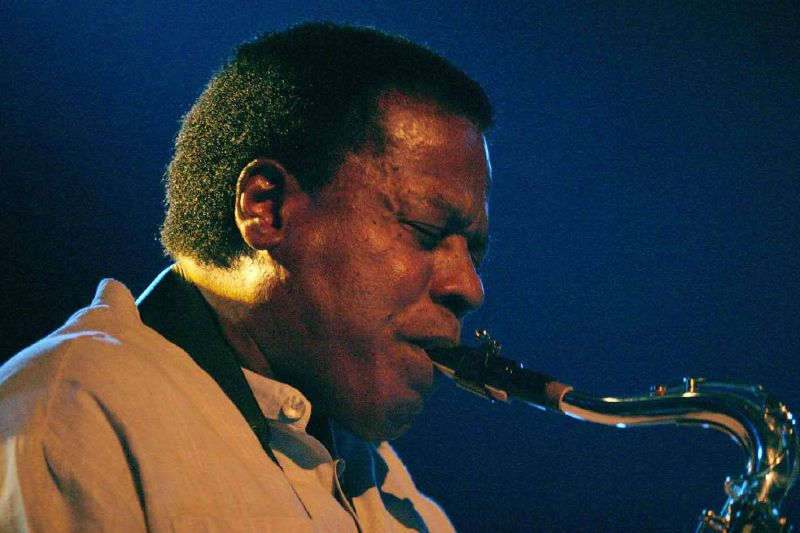
Wayne Shorter's compositions that have become standards include "Mahjong" (1964), "Speak No Evil" (1965) and "Footprints" (1966).

- 1965 – "Ceora". Written by Lee Morgan.
- 1965 – "Dindi". Composed by Antonio Carlos Jobim with lyrics by Aloysio de Oliveira (Portuguese) Ray Gilbert (English).
- 1965 – "Dolphin Dance". Composed by Herbie Hancock.
- 1965 – "E.S.P.". Composed by Wayne Shorter.
- 1965 – "The Gentle Rain" (a.k.a. "Chuva Delicada"). Written by Luiz Bonfá with English lyrics by Matt Dubey.
- 1965 – "The Gift!" (a.k.a. "Recado Bossa Nova"). Composed by Djalma Ferreira, with lyrics by Luiz Antônio (Portuguese) Paul Francis Webster (English).
- 1965 – "Maiden Voyage". Modal jazz composition by Herbie Hancock from his album Maiden Voyage. It was used in a Fabergé commercial and originally called "TV Jingle".
- 1965 – "Speak No Evil". Wayne Shorter.
- 1966 – "Footprints". Composed by Wayne Shorter.
- 1966 – "Mercy, Mercy, Mercy". Composed by Joe Zawinul with lyrics by Johnny "Guitar" Watson and Larry Williams.
- 1966 – "Summer Samba" (a.k.a. "Samba de Verão", also "So Nice") Composed by Marcos Valle with lyrics by Paulo Sérgio Valle (Portuguese) Norman Gimbel (English).
- 1967 – "Freedom Jazz Dance". Composed by Eddie Harris.
- 1967 – "Triste". Written by Antonio Carlos Jobim.
- 1967 – "Wave" (a.k.a. "Vou Te Contar"). Written by Antonio Carlos Jobim.

== 1960 ==
=== Events ===
- The Cannonball Adderley Quintet records At the Lighthouse at the Lighthouse Café in Hermosa Beach, California.

=== Album releases ===
- John Coltrane: Giant Steps
- Ornette Coleman: Free Jazz
- Max Roach: Freedom Now Suite
- Charles Mingus: Presents
- Gunther Schuller [John Lewis]: Jazz Abstractions
- George Russell: Jazz in the Space Age
- Eric Dolphy: Far Cry
- Joe Harriott: Free Form
- Tina Brooks: True Blue
- Randy Weston: Uhuru Afrika
- Cecil Taylor: The World of Cecil Taylor
- Gil Evans: Out of the Cool
- Lennie Tristano: The New Tristano
- Clark Terry: Color Changes
- Jimmy Giuffre: Piece for Clarinet and String Orchestra/Mobiles
- Hank Mobley: Soul Station
- Horace Silver: Horace-Scope
- Art Blakey: The Big Beat
- Art Blakey: A Night in Tunisia
- Modern Jazz Quartet: Pyramid
- Modern Jazz Quartet: European Concert
- Betty Carter: The Modern Sound of Betty Carter
- Oliver Nelson: Takin' Care of Business
- Wes Montgomery: The Incredible Jazz Guitar
- Sam Jones: The Soul Society
- George Russell: Stratusphunk
- David Newman and James Clay: The Sound of the Wide Open Spaces!!!!
- Duke Jordan: Flight to Jordan
- Herbie Mann: Flute, Brass, Vibes and Percussion
- the Jazztet: Meet the Jazztet
- Phil Woods: Rights of Swing
- Art Pepper: Gettin' Together
- Jimmy Smith: Back at the Chicken Shack
- Don Ellis: How Time Passes

=== Births ===
- Branford Marsalis (August 26, 1960–), saxophonist

=== Deaths ===
- Beverly Kenney (January 29, 1932 – April 13, 1960), singer
- Oscar Pettiford (September 30, 1922 – September 8, 1960)

=== Awards ===
- Grammy Awards of 1960
  - Best Jazz Performance Solo or Small Group
    - Jonah Jones for I Dig Chicks

== 1961 ==
=== Album releases ===
- Basie at Birdland - Count Basie Orchestra (Roulette)
- Buhaina's Delight - Art Blakey (Blue Note)
- A Jazz Hour with Art Blakey's Jazz Messengers: Blues March - Art Blakey (Movieplay)
- Mosaic - Art Blakey (Blue Note)
- Pisces - Art Blakey (Blue Note)
- Time Further Out - The Dave Brubeck Quartet (Columbia)
- Free Jazz: A Collective Improvisation - Ornette Coleman (Atlantic)
- Coltrane Jazz - John Coltrane (Atlantic)
- My Favorite Things - John Coltrane (Atlantic)
- Live in Stockholm 1961 - John Coltrane (LeJazz)
- American Freedom - Duke Ellington and Louis Armstrong (Blue Note)
- Out of the Cool - Gil Evans Orchestra (Impulse!)
- Focus - Stan Getz (Verve)
- The Futuristic Sounds of Sun Ra (aka, We are in the future) - Sun Ra and his Arkestra (Savoy Records)
- We Travel the Spaceways - Sun Ra and his Myth Science Arkestra
- Secrets of the Sun - by Sun Ra and his Solar Arkestra (El Saturn Records)
- Cosmic Tones for Mental Therapy - Sun Ra and his Myth Science Arkestra
- Bad and Beautiful - Sun Ra and his Myth Science Arkestra (El Saturn Records, Impulse!)
- Fate in a Pleasant Mood - Sun Ra and his Myth Science Arkestra (El Saturn Records, Impulse!)
- Percussion Bitter Sweet - Max Roach (Impulse!)
- Forbidden Fruit - Nina Simone (Colpix)
- New Ideas - Don Ellis (New Jazz - Prestige Records)
- On the Spur of the Moment - Horace Parlan (Blue Note)

== 1962 ==
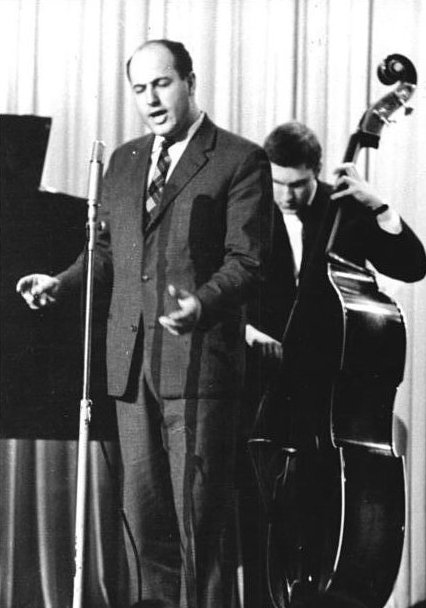
Jazz-Optimisten - Jamboree (1962)

=== Events ===
- Several recordings are made at the Lighthouse Café in Hermosa Beach, California: Curtis Amy, Tippin' on Through; The Jazz Crusaders, The Jazz Crusaders at the Lighthouse.

=== Album releases ===
- Bill Evans: Waltz for Debby
- Charles Mingus: Epitaph
- Cecil Taylor: Nefertiti
- Jimmy Giuffre: Free Fall
- Joe Harriott: Abstract
- Jackie McLean: Let Freedom Ring
- Sonny Rollins: The Bridge
- Dexter Gordon: Go
- Freddie Hubbard: The Artistry of Freddie Hubbard
- Jimmy Woods: Awakening!!
- George Russell: The Stratus Seekers
- Oscar Peterson: Night Train
- Prince Lasha: The Cry!
- Sheila Jordan: Portrait of Sheila
- Don Ellis: Essence
- Modern Jazz Quartet: The Comedy

=== Deaths ===
- Doug Watkins (March 2, 1934 – February 5, 1962)

== 1963 ==
=== Album releases ===
- Charles Mingus: The Black Saint and the Sinner Lady
- Sun Ra: Cosmic Tones For Mental Therapy
- Joe Harriott: Movement
- Andrew Hill: Black Fire
- Bill Evans: Conversations with Myself
- Thelonious Monk: Criss Cross
- Jackie McLean: Destination... Out!
- Stanley Turrentine: Soul Shoutin'
- Eric Dolphy: Iron Man
- Jackie McLean: One Step Beyond
- Joe Henderson: Page One
- Kai Winding: Solo
- Art Blakey: Ugetsu
- Lee Morgan: The Sidewinder
- Donald Byrd: A New Perspective
- Chico Hamilton: Man from Two Worlds
- Grant Green: Idle Moments
- Kenny Burrell: Midnight Blue

=== Deaths ===
- Dinah Washington (August 29, 1924 – December 14, 1963)
- Sonny Clark (July 21, 1931 – January 13, 1963)
- Ike Quebec (August 17, 1918 - January 16, 1963)
- Herbie Nichols (January 3, 1919 – April 12, 1963)

== 1964 ==
=== Album releases ===
- John Coltrane: A Love Supreme
- Albert Ayler: Spiritual Unity
- Eric Dolphy: Out to Lunch!
- Albert Ayler: New York Eye And Ear Control
- Albert Ayler: Witches and Devils
- Andrew Hill: Point of Departure
- Sam Rivers: Fuchsia Swing Song
- Wayne Shorter: Speak No Evil
- Herbie Hancock: Empyrean Isles
- New York Art Quartet: New York Art Quartet
- Albert Ayler: Vibrations
- Sun Ra: Other Planes of There
- Horace Silver: Song for My Father
- André Previn: My Fair Lady
- Denny Zeitlin: Carnival
- Kenny Burrell: Guitar Forms
- Ben Webster: See You at the Fair
- Oscar Peterson: Canadiana Suite
- Cal Tjader: Soul Sauce
- Denny Zeitlin: Cathexis
- Randy Weston: African Cookbook
- Duke Pearson: Wahoo
- Freddie Hubbard: Breaking Point
- Joe Henderson: In 'n Out
- Tony Scott: Music for Zen Meditation
- Joe Henderson: Inner Urge
- Larry Young: Into Somethin'
- Lee Morgan: Search For The New Land
- John Coltrane: Crescent
- Oscar Peterson: Trio Plus One
- Shirley Scott: Blue Flames
- Wayne Shorter: JuJu
- Tony Williams: Life Time
- Guenter Hampel: Heartplants

=== Deaths ===
- Eric Dolphy (June 20, 1928 – June 29, 1964), American alto saxophonist, flautist, and bass clarinetist
- Jack Teagarden (August 20, 1905 – January 15, 1964)
- Cecil Scott (November 22, 1905 – January 5, 1964)

== 1965 ==
=== Album releases ===
- John Coltrane: Ascension
- Sun Ra: The Magic City
- Marion Brown: Marion Brown Quartet
- Don Cherry: Complete Communion
- Sam Rivers: Contours
- Herbie Hancock: Maiden Voyage
- Roland Kirk: Rip, Rig and Panic
- Sun Ra: The Heliocentric Worlds of Sun Ra, Volume Two
- John Coltrane: Meditations
- Milford Graves: Percussion Ensemble
- Patty Waters: Sings
- Wayne Shorter: The All Seeing Eye
- Andrew Hill: Compulsion
- Ornette Coleman: Chappaqua Suite
- Wayne Shorter: Soothsayer
- Bobby Hutcherson: Components
- New York Art Quartet: Mohawk
- Horace Silver: The Cape Verdean Blues
- Bobby Hutcherson: Dialogue
- Ben Webster: Stormy Weather
- Lee Morgan: Cornbread
- Prince Lasha: Inside Story
- Lee Morgan: The Gigolo
- Archie Shepp: Fire Music
- Roswell Rudd: Roswell Rudd
- Eddie Palmieri: Mozambique
- Gabor Szabo: Gypsy
- Vince Guaraldi: A Charlie Brown Christmas soundtrack

=== Deaths ===
- Nat King Cole (March 17, 1919 – February 15, 1965)
- Tadd Dameron (February 21, 1917 – March 8, 1965)
- Claude Thornhill (August 10, 1908 – July 1, 1965)
- Earl Bostic (April 25, 1913 – October 28, 1965)

=== Births ===
- Sylvain Luc (April 7), French guitarist

== 1966 ==
=== Events ===
- The Jazz Crusaders record Live at the Lighthouse '66 at the Lighthouse Café in Hermosa Beach, California

=== Album releases ===
- Cecil Taylor: Unit Structures
- Roscoe Mitchell: Sound
- Don Cherry: Symphony For Improvisers
- Cecil Taylor: Conquistador!
- Alexander von Schlippenbach: Globe Unity
- Archie Shepp: Mama Too Tight
- Steve Lacy: The Forest And The Zoo
- Joe Harriott: Indo-Jazz Suite
- Steve Lacy: Sortie
- Duke Ellington: The Far East Suite
- Chick Corea: Tones For Joan's Bones
- Sun Ra: Strange Strings
- Patty Waters: College Tour
- Joseph Jarman: Song For
- Guenter Hampel: Assemblage
- Joe Harriott: Indo-Jazz Fusions
- Bobby Hutcherson: Happenings
- Wayne Shorter: Adam's Apple
- Bobby Hutcherson: Stick-Up!
- Charles Lloyd: Dream Weaver
- Charles Tyler: Charles Tyler Ensemble
- Denny Zeitlin: Zeitgeist
- Jaki Byard: Sunshine of My Soul
- Horace Silver: The Jody Grind
- Larry Young: Of Love And Peace
- Lee Morgan: Delightfulee
- Sonny Simmons: Music from the Spheres
- Dewey Redman: Look for the Black Star
- Sunny Murray: Sunny Murray Quintet
- Frank Wright: Frank Wright Trio

=== Deaths ===
- Bud Powell (September 27, 1924 – July 31, 1966)
- Dave Lambert (June 19, 1917 - October 3, 1966)
- Billy Kyle (July 14, 1914 - February 23, 1966)

== 1967 ==
=== Album releases ===
- Sun Ra: Atlantis
- Gary Burton: A Genuine Tong Funeral
- Sam Rivers: Dimensions and Extensions
- Roscoe Mitchell: Old Quartet
- Bill Dixon: Intents and Purposes
- George Russell: Othello Ballet Suite/Electronic Organ Sonata No. 1
- Muhal Richard Abrams: Levels and Degrees of Light
- Archie Shepp: The Magic of Ju-Ju
- Don Ellis: Turkish Bath
- Jackie McLean: New and Old Gospel
- Roland Kirk: The Inflated Tear
- Frank Wright: Your Prayer
- Spontaneous Music Ensemble: Withdrawal
- Peter Brötzmann: For Adolphe Sax
- Miles Davis: Nefertiti
- Jackie McLean: Demon's Dance
- Miles Davis: Sorcerer
- Gary Burton: Duster
- John Coltrane: Expression
- McCoy Tyner: The Real McCoy
- Wayne Shorter: Schizophrenia
- Lee Konitz: The Lee Konitz Duets
- Paul Bley: Virtuosi
- Lester Bowie: Numbers 1 & 2
- Paul Bley: Ballads

=== Deaths ===
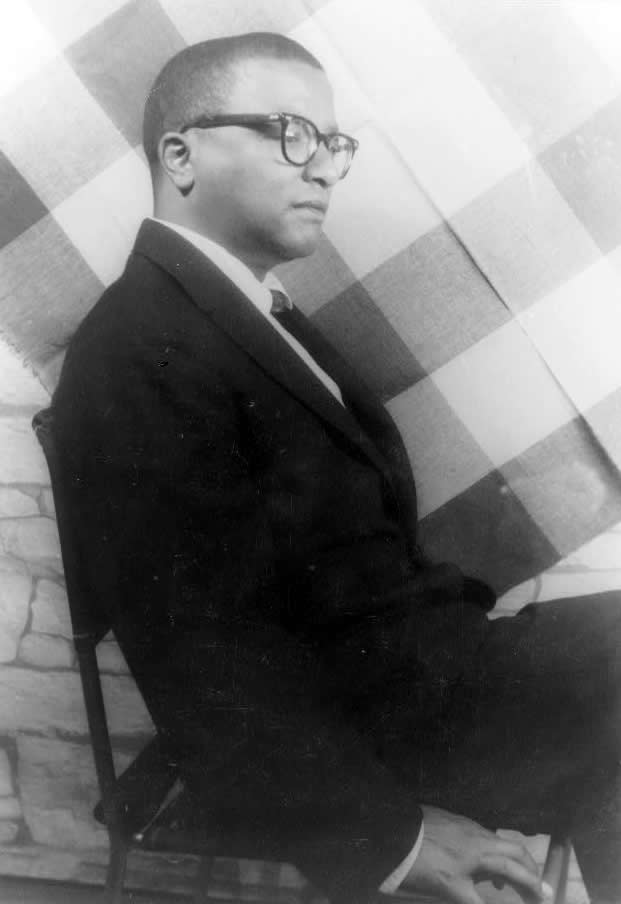
Billy Strayhorn

- Billy Strayhorn (November 29, 1915 – May 31, 1967), composer and pianist
- John Coltrane (September 23, 1926 – July 17, 1967), American saxophonist and composer
- Paul Whiteman (March 28, 1890 – December 29, 1967)
- Stuff Smith (August 14, 1909 - September 25, 1967)
- Rex Stewart (February 22, 1907 – September 7, 1967)
- Red Allen (January 7, 1906 – April 17, 1967)
- Edmond Hall (May 15, 1901 – February 11, 1967)
- Willie Smith (November 25, 1910 – March 7, 1967)

== 1968 ==
=== Album releases ===
- Chick Corea: Now He Sings, Now He Sobs
- Roscoe Mitchell: Congliptious
- Don Cherry: Eternal Rhythm
- Miles Davis: Filles de Kilimanjaro
- Peter Brötzmann: Machine Gun
- John Surman: John Surman
- Spontaneous Music Ensemble: Karyobin
- Kenny Wheeler: Windmill Tilter
- Modern Jazz Quartet: Under the Jasmin Tree
- Roland Kirk: Left & Right
- Sun Ra: Outer Spaceways Incorporated
- Horace Silver: Serenade to a Soul Sister
- Paul Horn: Inside the Taj Mahal
- McCoy Tyner: Expansions
- Gary Bartz: Another Earth
- Pat Martino: Baiyina (The Clear Evidence)
- Charles Tolliver: Paper Man
- Herbie Hancock: Speak Like a Child
- Miles Davis: Miles in the Sky
- John Coltrane: Om

=== Births ===
- Kyle Eastwood -bassist (May 19, 1968-)

=== Deaths ===
- Wes Montgomery (March 6, 1923 - June 15, 1968)
- Luckey Roberts (August 7, 1887 – February 5, 1968)

== 1969 ==
=== Events ===
- Trumpeter Miles Davis uses a wah-wah pedal on Bitches Brew.

=== Album releases ===
- Don Cherry: Mu
- Miles Davis: Bitches Brew
- Pharoah Sanders: Karma
- Miles Davis: In a Silent Way
- Art Ensemble of Chicago: People in Sorrow
- George Russell: Electronic Sonata For Souls Loved By Nature
- Art Ensemble of Chicago: Reese and the Smooth Ones
- Kalaparusha Maurice McIntyre: Humility in the Light of the Creator
- Charlie Haden: Liberation Music Orchestra
- Dollar Brand: African Piano
- Guenter Hampel: The 8th of July 1969
- Roland Kirk: Rahsaan Rahsaan
- Pharoah Sanders: Jewels of Thought
- Archie Shepp: Yasmina, a Black Woman
- Art Ensemble of Chicago: A Jackson In Your House
- Charles Tolliver: The Ringer
- Joe McPhee: Underground Railroad
- Jan Garbarek: Esoteric Circle
- Pharoah Sanders: Izipho Zam
- Sunny Murray: Homage to Africa
- Chick Corea: Is
- Dewey Redman: Tarik
- Willem Breuker: Lunchconcert For Three Barrel-organs
- Joe Harriott: Hum-Dono
- Peter Brötzmann: Nipples
- Charles Earland: Black Talk
- Wolfgang Dauner: Fuer
- Eric Kloss: To Hear Is To See
- Leon Thomas: Spirits Known and Unknown
- Miroslav Vitous: Mountain in the Clouds
- Tony Williams: Emergency!
- Archie Shepp: Blasé
- Dollar Brand: African Sketchbook
- John McLaughlin: Extrapolation
- Stanley Cowell: Blues for the Viet Cong
- Stanley Cowell: Brilliant Circles
- Wolfgang Dauner: The Oimels
- Horace Tapscott: West Coast Hot
- Liberation Music Orchestra: Song for Che

=== Births ===
- Joshua Redman (February 1, 1969-), saxophonist

=== Deaths ===
- Paul Chambers (April 22, 1935 – January 4, 1969)
- Coleman Hawkins (November 21, 1904 – May 19, 1969)
- Pee Wee Russell (March 27, 1906 – February 15, 1969)

== Bibliography ==
- The New Real Book, Volume I. Sher Music. 1988. ISBN 0-9614701-4-3.
- The New Real Book, Volume II. Sher Music. 1991. ISBN 0-9614701-7-8.
- The New Real Book, Volume III. Sher Music. 1995. ISBN 1-883217-30-X.
- The Real Book, Volume I (6th ed.). Hal Leonard. 2004. ISBN 0-634-06038-4.
- The Real Book, Volume II (2nd ed.). Hal Leonard. 2007. ISBN 1-4234-2452-2.
- The Real Book, Volume III (2nd ed.). Hal Leonard. 2006. ISBN 0-634-06136-4.
- The Real Jazz Book. Warner Bros. ISBN 978-91-85041-36-7.
- The Real Vocal Book, Volume I. Hal Leonard. 2006. ISBN 0-634-06080-5.
