= Four Days in December =

Jazz festival in NYC in 1964

- Poster advertising Four Days in December
- Genre: Jazz, Free jazz
- Dates: December 28–31, 1964
- Locations: 165 West 57th Street, New York City
- Years active: 1964
- Founders: Jazz Composers Guild
- Attendance: 750

Four Days in December (also listed as 4 Days in December) was a four-day festival of new jazz music that took place at Judson Hall in New York City. Sponsored by the Jazz Composers Guild, it occurred from December 28–31, 1964, and was the group's most visible event. Along with the October Revolution in Jazz, held two months prior and organized by Bill Dixon, it led to a sense of optimism regarding the possibility of producing concerts via non-traditional means.

== Background ==
Following the success of the October Revolution and the subsequent formation of the Jazz Composers Guild, the group sponsored a series of concerts featuring the Sun Ra Arkestra, the Roswell Rudd-John Tchicai Quartet (later renamed the New York Art Quartet), the Paul Bley Quintet, the Alan Silva Quartet, the Cecil Taylor Unit, the Bill Dixon Sextette, the Free Form Improvisation Ensemble, and the Archie Shepp Septette, at various locations. One of these concerts, called the "Pre-Halloween Jazz Party," ran from 9:00 p.m. – 6:00 a.m. on October 30–31 and was put on "to raise funds to provide a permanent home for the Guild."

According to Bill Dixon, the December concert series, which featured two groups each evening, was put together on a very tight budget. He reflected: "We didn't have any money... I got a bunch of newspapers and showed everyone how to make signs with magic marker, and from 91st Street down to 57th Street, we put them up in every damn subway station there was." Dixon was also able to purchase small advertisements in The Village Voice, The New York Times, and DownBeat. Advance tickets were sold at the Sam Goody and Jazz Record Center stores, as well as the apartment of trombonist Roswell Rudd, and could be purchased for two dollars.

== Event schedule ==
The following performers appeared at the event:

=== December 28, 1964 (Monday) ===
- Cecil Taylor Unit with Jimmy Lyons, Michael Mantler, Buell Neidlinger, and Andrew Cyrille
- Bill Dixon Quintet with Robin Kenyatta, Bob Ralston, Reggie Johnson, and Rashied Ali

=== December 29, 1964 (Tuesday) ===
- Paul Bley Quintet with Marshall Allen, Manny Smith, Eddie Gómez, and Milford Graves
- Jazz Composers' Guild Orchestra with Michael Mantler, Willie Ruff, Roswell Rudd, Steve Lacy, Jimmy Lyons, John Tchicai, Archie Shepp, Fred Pirtle, Eddie Gómez, Paul Bley, and Milford Graves

=== December 30, 1964 (Wednesday) ===
- Free Form Improvisation Ensemble with John Winter, Gary William Friedman, Burton Greene, Alan Silva, and Clarence Walker
- Archie Shepp Sextet with Charles Tolliver, Benny Jacobs-El, Marion Brown, Reggie Johnson, and Roger Blank

=== December 31, 1964 (Thursday) ===
- Sun Ra Arkestra with Chris Capers, Al Evans, Teddy Nance, Bernard Pettaway, Black Harold, Marshall Allen, Danny Davis, Pharoah Sanders, Pat Patrick, Ronnie Boykins, Alan Silva, Clifford Jarvis, Jimhmi Johnson, and Art Jenkins
- Roswell Rudd-John Tchicai Quartet with Don Moore and Milford Graves

== Reception and impact ==
Bill Dixon recalled that "On the opening night, you couldn't get in!" Approximately 300 people attended the first concert, while the remaining concerts each drew about 150. Press coverage was unusually extensive for such an event, and reviewers included John S. Wilson of The New York Times, Don Heckman of DownBeat, A. B. Spellman of The Nation, and Whitney Balliett of The New Yorker. Following the success of the concert series, the Jazz Composers Guild continued to present live music at the Contemporary Center, a loft space above the Village Vanguard on Seventh Avenue.

== Recordings ==
Dixon hired recording engineer Jerry Newman to tape the performances; however, only some of the recordings were released to the public. Carla Bley's first large-scale composition, titled "Roast," was premiered at the December 29 concert, and was included on the 1965 Jazz Composers Orchestra release Communication. The New York Art Quartet album Call It Art, issued in 2013, features five tracks recorded at the December 31 event. Sun Ra's portion of the December 31 concert was included on the 2012 Pharoah Sanders album In the Beginning 1963–1964.
