= Robin Kenyatta =

American saxophonist (1942–2004)

- Born: Robert Prince Haynes; March 6, 1942; Moncks Corner, South Carolina, U.S.
- Origin: New York City, New York, U.S.
- Died: October 26, 2004 (aged 62) Lausanne, Switzerland
- Genres: Jazz
- Instruments: Alto saxophone, soprano saxophone, flute

Robin Kenyatta (March 6, 1942 – October 26, 2004) was an American jazz alto saxophonist.

== Early life ==
Born Robert Prince Haynes in Moncks Corner, South Carolina, Kenyatta grew up in New York City and began playing the saxophone at the age of 14. He was mostly self-taught, learning alto, tenor, and soprano saxophones and flute, but received encouragement and help from professional musicians such as John Handy.

== Career ==
Kenyatta joined the United States Army in 1962 and played in a military band for two years. Upon being discharged, he returned to New York and adopted the name Kenyatta as a tribute to Jomo Kenyatta, the Kenyan anti-colonial activist, and began pursuing a career as a professional musician.

In 1964, Bill Dixon heard Kenyatta and invited him to participate in the October Revolution in Jazz. On December 28 of that year, Kenyatta played as a member of the Bill Dixon Quintet as part of the "Four Days in December" concert series at Judson Hall, substituting for Giuseppi Logan, who was injured. According to Dixon biographer Benjamin Young, "Kenyatta became such an effective part of the group as Logan was recovering that the latter never rejoined Dixon's outfit." During this time, he met John Coltrane, who praised his playing. Kenyatta performed with Dixon's group again at the Contemporary Center from March 19 to March 20, 1965, and with the Jazz Composer's Orchestra at the same location from April 9 to April 11 of that year. He also appeared on the Jazz Composer's Orchestra album Communication, recorded on April 10.

Later that year, Kenyatta made his first recorded appearance on the album Portrait In Soul by pianist and composer Valerie Capers. In 1966, he appeared on Sonny Stitt's album Deuces Wild, as well as Roswell Rudd's Everywhere and Dixon's Intents and Purposes. Kenyatta released Until, his first album as a leader, the following year.

In 1969, Kenyatta moved to Paris, France, where he continued to perform and record, releasing Beggars & Stealers and Girl from Martinique under his own name. In 1972, he moved back to New York, and recorded three albums that were more mainstream than his previous releases – Gypsy Man, Terra Nova, and Stompin' at the Savoy, for Atlantic Records. He also released a version of the theme from the 1972 film Last Tango in Paris during this time. In the mid-1970s, he moved to Lausanne, Switzerland, where he taught music at the Ecole de Jazz Musique Actuelle and founded the Hello Jazz Music School and shop. Throughout the 1970s, he recorded as a sideman for Alan Silva, Andrew Hill, Magma, Oscar Brown, Ted Curson, Sam Rivers, and Archie Shepp.

During the 1980s and 1990s, Kenyatta performed at major jazz festivals with Dizzy Gillespie, Paul Simon, George Benson, B.B. King, The Isley Brothers, and other major artists. Kenyatta also continued to record under his own name, trying "to find a comfortable middle ground between fusion, instrumental pop, and his hard bop and free music roots."

In 2001, he moved back to New York and commuted to a teaching position at Bentley University in Waltham, Massachusetts. In 2003, he released a funk and blues-influenced album titled Cool Blue.

== Death ==
In 2004, Kenyatta flew to Lausanne for a performance, but died in his sleep on October 26.

== Discography ==
=== As leader ===
- 1966–1967: Until (Vortex, 1967) – reissued on Wounded Bird
- 1970: Girl from Martinique (ECM, 1971)
- 1972?: Free State Band (America, 1972)
- 1972–1973: Gypsy Man (Atlantic, 1973)
- 1973: Terra Nova (Atlantic, 1973)
- 1974: Stompin' at the Savoy (Atlantic, 1974)
- 1969, 1975: Beggars & Stealers (Muse, 1977)
- 1975: Nomusa (Muse, 1975)
- 1976?: Encourage the People (Wolf, 1976)
- 1977: Beggars And Stealers (Muse, 1977)
- 1979: Take the Heat off Me (Jazz Dance, 1979)
- 1987, 1989: Live at Cully: Blues for Mama Doll (Jazz Dance, 1989)
- 1991?: Ghost Stories featuring Ronnie Burrage (ITM Pacific, 1991)
- 2001?: Cool Blue (Jazz Dance, 2001)

=== As a member ===
Jazz Composer's Orchestra

- Communication (JCO, 1965)

=== As sideman ===
With Roswell Rudd

- Everywhere (Impulse!, 1966) – also released as part of Mixed (1998)
- Blown Bone (Emanem, 2006) – 1 track

With Archie Shepp

- For Losers (Impulse!, 1971)
- Kwanza (Impulse!, 1974)

With Alan Silva

- Seasons (BYG Actuel, 1971)
- My Country (Leo, 1989)

With others

- Oscar Brown Jr., Brother Where Are You (Atlantic, 1974)
- Valerie Capers, Portrait in Soul (Atlantic, 1966)
- Ted Curson, Quicksand (Atlantic, 1974)
- Bill Dixon, Intents and Purposes (RCA Victor, 1967)
- Andrew Hill, Spiral (Freedom, 1975)
- Sam Rivers, Crystals (Impulse!, 1974)
- Sonny Stitt, Deuces Wild (Atlantic, 1966)
