= Lewis Worrell =

American jazz double bassist

- Born: Lewis James Worrell; November 7, 1934; Charlotte, North Carolina
- Genres: Jazz, free jazz, avant-garde jazz
- Occupation: Musician
- Instrument: double bass

Lewis Worrell (born November 7, 1934) is a jazz double bassist best known for his work during the 1960s with Albert Ayler, the New York Art Quartet, Roswell Rudd, and Archie Shepp.

== Biography ==
Worrell was born in Charlotte, North Carolina, and began playing the tuba at age 11, switching to double bass six years later. In 1953 he graduated from Second Ward High School in Brooklyn (Charlotte, North Carolina), after which he served in the United States Military in France. He was a member of John Lewis' Orchestra USA and played with Bud Powell and Elmo Hope. Worrell's first recording was in 1963, on Hank Crawford's album True Blue.

In 1964, Worrell joined the New York Art Quartet, replacing Don Moore, and participated in the recording of their first, self-titled album. He also performed with the NYAQ as part of the October Revolution in Jazz. The following year, he recorded with Albert Ayler on the live album Bells, and with Sunny Murray on his album Sonny's Time Now. In 1966, he appeared on Ayler's At Slug's Saloon, Vol. 1 & 2 and also recorded two albums with Archie Shepp (Live in San Francisco and Three for a Quarter, One for a Dime, both released on Impulse!), as well as on Roswell Rudd's album Everywhere. Worrell made a handful of recordings in the late 1960s and early 1970s, then disappeared from the music scene.

== Discography ==
=== As sideman ===
With Albert Ayler

- Bells (ESP-Disk, 1965)
- The New Wave in Jazz (Impulse!, 1966) (one track)
- At Slug's Saloon, Vol. 1 (Base Record, 1982)
- At Slug's Saloon, Vol. 2 (Base Record, 1982)

With Hank Crawford

- True Blue (Atlantic, 1964)

With Robin Kenyatta

- Until (Vortex, 1967)
- Stompin' at the Savoy (Atlantic, 1974)

With Sunny Murray

- Sonny's Time Now (Jihad, 1965)

With the New York Art Quartet

- New York Art Quartet (ESP-Disk, 1964)
- Call It Art (Triple Point, 2013)

With Sam Rivers

- Live (Impulse!, 1998)

With Roswell Rudd

- Everywhere (Impulse!, 1966) (tracks reissued on Mixed (Impulse!, 1998)
- Blown Bone (Emanem, 2006)

With Archie Shepp

- Live in San Francisco (Impulse!, 1966)
- Three for a Quarter, One for a Dime (Impulse!, 1966)
