= 35th Reunion =

Studio album by New York Art Quartet
- Released: 2000
- Recorded: June 14, 1999
- Studio: Avatar (New York, New York)
- Genre: Free jazz
- Label: DIW Records
- Producer: Verna Gillis

New York Art Quartet chronology
Mohawk (1965)	35th Reunion (2000)	Old Stuff (2010)

35th Reunion is the third album by the New York Art Quartet. It was recorded at Avatar Studios in New York City on June 14, 1999, and was released in 2000 by DIW Records. It features John Tchicai on alto saxophone, Roswell Rudd on trombone, Reggie Workman on bass, and Milford Graves on percussion. Amiri Baraka, whose poem "Black Dada Nihilismus" was included on the group's debut album, also appears.

On June 13, 1999, nearly 35 years after their inception, the NYAQ reunited for a performance at the Bell Atlantic Jazz Festival, opening for Sonic Youth. The group recorded 35th Reunion the following day.

== Reception ==
Professional ratings
Review scores
Source	Rating
AllMusic	3/5 stars

In a review for AllMusic, Steve Loewy wrote: "the group ... sounds as fresh and, yes, revolutionary as it did back in the heyday of 1960s radicalism. To be sure, each member has changed, but the sounds here are surprisingly recognizable after all these years. Rudd remains unconventionally rough-toned, while Graves squeezes colors from his percussive conglomerations. Baraka crafts his poems with shocking alacrity, spewing sounds of the angry prophet in deceptively soothing salve. Some may decry the emphasis on the verbal, but you can't bemoan its power."

Writing for All About Jazz, Mark Corroto commented: "Thirty-five years after their self-titled ESP recording, the quartet plus Amiri Baraka... is back to remind us that the New Thing has yet to become an old thing. Baraka asks, 'of what use is poetry?' and is answered by a collective and spontaneous creation. Rudd, who takes me back to Steve Lacy and their interpretations of Thelonious Monk and Herbie Nichols, plays with such superb vocalization while Graves's throaty accompaniment of his percussion leaves a magic picture in the minds eye. Baraka's recollection of the turbulent sixties on 'Seek Light At Once' is the highlight of the recording, acting as the most creative bridge to the 21st century so far."

== Track listing ==
No.	Title	Length
1.	"A Meeting of Remarkable Journeys" (Baraka/Graves)	6:48
2.	"Reentering" (Baraka/Workman)	13:59
3.	"Llanto del Indio" (Tchicai)	7:59
4.	"Vg's Birthday Jamboree" (Rudd)	8:42
5.	"Visiting Ogun" (Workman)	4:15
6.	"Perceiving Passerby's" (Graves)	4:10
7.	"Seek Light at Once" (Baraka/Tchicai)	10:34
8.	"Music's Underwear" (Baraka/Rudd)	10:32
Total length:		66:59

Recorded on June 14, 1999, at Avatar Studios, New York City.

== Personnel ==
- John Tchicai – alto saxophone
- Roswell Rudd – trombone
- Reggie Workman – bass
- Milford Graves – drums
- Amiri Baraka – poetry reading
