= Everywhere (Roswell Rudd album) =

Studio album by Roswell Rudd
- Released: 1967
- Recorded: July 8, 1966
- Genre: Jazz
- Length: 47:15
- Label: Impulse!
- Producer: Bob Thiele, Roswell Rudd

Roswell Rudd chronology
| Everywhere (1967) | Roswell Rudd (1971) |

Everywhere is an album by American jazz trombonist Roswell Rudd featuring studio performances recorded in July 1966 for the Impulse! label.

In the album's liner notes, Rudd says that "the idea for this album, i.e. what players and compositions to use, came to me while in San Francisco with Archie Shepp's band in February of 1966." A preceding Impulse! release, Archie Shepp Live in San Francisco featured that group's February 19, 1966 performance at the Both/And Club.

Since the time of the album's initial release it has been re-issued once in the United States: on the 1998 compilation CD Mixed, joined with October 1961 performances by the Cecil Taylor Unit (originally released as part of Gil Evans' album Into the Hot). The album had only previously been issued on CD (catalog # MVCI-23046) with its original title and artist name, in 1991 by MCA Victor, Japan.

== Reception ==
Professional ratings
Review scores
| Source | Rating |
|---|---|
| AllMusic | 2.5/5 stars |

The AllMusic review written in the 1990s by Scott Yanow awarded the album 2½ stars, calling it "An intriguing but far from essential date". However, Yanow qualified the "far from essential" remark in his other review of Everywhere's four tracks on the 1998 compilation CD Mixed, where he stated "Although not Roswell Rudd's greatest album, there are enough fascinating ensembles on this set for it to nearly hold its own with Cecil Taylor's more essential session".

In a review for KPCC, Peter Stenshoel stated that the album was "burnt into [his] brain" when he awoke during the night "to hear the man's trombone exhorting like Ian McKellen strutting a stage: barking, growling, teasing the language. All around him a conflagration was fed by high-pitched reeds, two string basses, and a drummer with six arms." He praised "Yankee No-How," writing: "The fun melody gives way to a healthy group improvisation that flows organically, functions as single working unit and reveals the impromptu skills of his fellow musicians."

Writer Todd Jenkins stated that although "the saxophonists provide some valuable textural support," it is "clearly the trombonist's show." He wrote: "as an illustration of his formative days this recording is of interest."

== Track listing ==
1. "Everywhere" (Bill Harris) - 11:32
2. "Yankee No-How" - 12:03
3. "Respects" - 11:39
4. "Satan's Dance" (Giuseppi Logan) - 12:01

All compositions by Roswell Rudd except as indicated

- Recorded in New York City on July 8, 1966

== Personnel ==
- Roswell Rudd - trombone
- Giuseppi Logan - flute, bass clarinet
- Robin Kenyatta - alto saxophone
- Lewis Worrell, Charlie Haden - bass
- Beaver Harris - drums
