= Eli's Chosen Six =

US musical group

Eli's Chosen Six was the ensemble that appeared in the influential 1958 concert film Jazz On A Summer's Day played Dixieland as they drove around Newport in a convertible jalopy. It was a famous Yale University Dixieland band of the 1950s that played the boisterous trad-jazz style of the day. The ensemble of white college-student jazz revivalists rose into popular prominence in the mid-1950s, when "college jazz" was a catchphrase. The sextet was founded and managed by Dick Voigt, and counted as members the later-legendary trombonist Roswell Rudd, bassists Buell Neidlinger (succeeded by Bob Morgan), cornetist and cartoonist Lee Lorenz, clarinetist Pete Williams (who was succeeded by Leroy Sam Parkins) and drummer Lyman "House" Drake (who was succeeded by Steve Little). With the help of the producer and Yale alumnus George Avakian, the band recorded an album for Columbia Records in 1955.

Eli’s Chosen Six appeared not only in the 1958 film, but also performed at Carnegie Hall, toured most of the major college campuses in the northeast and appeared at many top jazz clubs around the country. After Yale, founder Dick Voigt performed in combos led by Wild Bill Davison, Vic Dickenson, Bob Wilber, Henry Goodwin, J. C. Higginbotham and Doc Cheatham. The most prominent alumnus of the group was Rudd, of whom it was said “all his future endeavors--including his landmark collaborations with Cecil Taylor, Archie Shepp, John Tchicai and Steve Lacy--grew out of the lessons learned while playing rags and stomps for drunken college kids in Connecticut.”
