= Jazz on a Summer's Day =

1959 American concert film

- Film poster
- Directed by: Aram Avakian; Bert Stern
- Written by: Albert D'Annibale; Arnold Perl
- Produced by: George Avakian
- Cinematography: Aram Avakian
- Edited by: Aram Avakian
- Production company: Raven Films
- Distributed by: Galaxy Attractions
- Release date: August 1959 (Venice Film Festival)
- Running time: 85 minutes
- Country: United States
- Language: English

Jazz on a Summer's Day is a 1959 concert film set at the 1958 Newport Jazz Festival in Newport, Rhode Island (which took place from July 3 to July 6 of 1958). The film was directed and edited by Aram Avakian; he also was the principal cinematographer. It was co-directed by Bert Stern, a commercial and fashion photographer, who directed the party scenes that featured his friends, as well as the water scenes. George Avakian was the music supervisor. In 1999, the film was selected for preservation in the United States National Film Registry by the Library of Congress as being "culturally, historically, or aesthetically significant".

== Synopsis ==
The film mixes images of water with the performers and audience at the festival. It also features scenes of the 1958 America's Cup yacht races. The film is largely without dialogue or narration barring the periodic announcements by emcee Willis Conover.

The film features performances by Jimmy Giuffre, Thelonious Monk, Sonny Stitt, Anita O'Day, Dinah Washington, Gerry Mulligan, Chuck Berry, Chico Hamilton (with Eric Dolphy), and Louis Armstrong (with Jack Teagarden). Also appearing are Buck Clayton, Jo Jones, Armando Peraza, and Eli's Chosen Six, and the Yale College student ensemble that included trombonist Roswell Rudd, shown driving around Newport in a convertible jalopy, playing Dixieland.

As was scheduled in advance and announced in the program, the last performer Saturday night was Mahalia Jackson, who sang a one-hour program beginning at midnight, thus ushering in Sunday morning. The film concluded with her performance of The Lord's Prayer.

Beat poet Gregory Corso can be seen in the audience a few times.

== Lineup ==
- Jimmy Giuffre 3: Jimmy Giuffre, Bob Brookmeyer, Jim Hall
- Thelonious Monk Trio: Thelonious Monk, Henry Grimes, Roy Haynes
- Sonny Stitt and Sal Salvador
- Anita O'Day
- George Shearing
- Dinah Washington with Terry Gibbs, Urbie Green, and Max Roach
- Gerry Mulligan Quartet with Art Farmer
- Big Maybelle
- Chuck Berry
- Chico Hamilton Quintet with Eric Dolphy
- Louis Armstrong and his All-Stars: Trummy Young, Danny Barcelona, and Jack Teagarden
- Mahalia Jackson

== Premiere ==
The film premiered at the 1959 Venice Film Festival.

== Reception ==
The film received a 100% score on Rotten Tomatoes.

== Home media ==
The film was also re-released in 2009 by Charly Records and sold with an audio CD of the music and some of the commentary on a 60th anniversary edition. In 2021, Kino Lorber released a version restored in 4K from the best surviving elements on Blu-ray and DVD.

== See also ==
- List of American films of 1959
- 1959 in jazz
- Bert Stern
