= Quintessence (Spontaneous Music Ensemble album) =

Live album by Spontaneous Music Ensemble
- Released: 1986
- Recorded: October 11 & 18, 1973 and February 3, 1974
- Venue: Little Theatre Club and Institute of Contemporary Arts, London
- Genre: Free jazz
- Length: 135:59
- Label: Emanem; 4217

Spontaneous Music Ensemble chronology
Face to Face (1973)	Quintessence (1986)	Biosystem (1977)

Quintessence is a live album by the Spontaneous Music Ensemble featuring percussionist/cornetist John Stevens saxophonists Trevor Watts and Evan Parker, guitarist Derek Bailey, and bassist Kent Carter which was recorded in 1973 and released on the Emanem label. The album was first released in two parts on separate LPs entitles Eighty Five Minutes in 1986 then with additional material as two separate CDs entitled Quintessence in 1997 and finally as a single 2-CD set in 2007.

== Reception ==
Professional ratings
Review scores
Source	Rating
Allmusic	4/5 stars
Penguin Guide to Jazz	4/4 stars

Allmusic's François Couture noted "The true quintessence of Stevens' vision can be heard as the musicians give the best of themselves, remaining very personal in their playing (just compare Parker and Watts all the way through), while constantly keeping the focus on the group and the music happening here and now. Beautiful". On All About Jazz Nic Jones called it "one of the seminal recorded documents of free improvisation" and said "Viewed overall, this is a release that should appeal to anyone tired of the predictable. It captures an important moment in the individual creative development of each musician, and also an enduring moment in improvised music's development. Deeply compelling". The Penguin Guide to Jazz selected this album as part of its suggested Core Collection.

== Track listing ==
All compositions by John Stevens, Kent Carter, Trevor Watts, Derek Bailey and Evan Parker except where noted.

Disc one

1. "Forty Minutes (part 1)" - 19:32 Originally released on Eighty Five Minutes - Part 1
2. "Forty Minutes (part 2)" - 20:39 Originally released on Eighty Five Minutes - Part 1
3. "Thirty-five Minutes (part 1)" - 25:42 Originally released on Eighty Five Minutes - Part 2
4. "Thirty-five Minutes (part 2)" - 8:56 Originally released on Eighty Five Minutes - Part 2

Disc two

1. "Ten Minutes" - 10:07 Originally released on Eighty Five Minutes - Part 2
2. "Rambunctious 1" (Carter, Stevens, Watts) - 18:36 Originally released on Quintessence 1
3. "Rambunctious 2" (Carter, Stevens, Watts) - 4:47 Originally released on Quintessence 1
4. "Daa-Oom" [trio version] (Carter, Stevens, Watts) - 5:05 Originally released on Quintessence 1
5. "Corsop" (Stevens, Watts) - 11:08 Originally released on Quintessence 2
6. "Daa-Oom" [duo version] (Stevens, Watts) - 10:19 Originally released on Quintessence 2

Note

- Recorded at the Little Theatre Club on October 11, 1973 (disc two: tracks 5 & 6) and October 18, 1973 (disc two: tracks 2–4) and at the ICA Theatre on February 3, 1974 (disc one and disc two: track 1)

== Personnel ==
- John Stevens - percussion, cornet, voice
- Trevor Watts - soprano saxophone
- Evan Parker - soprano saxophone (Disc One and Disc Two, track 1)
- Derek Bailey - guitar (Disc One and Disc Two, track 1)
- Kent Carter - cello, bass (Disc One and Disc Two, tracks 1–4)
