= Gypsy Man =

Studio album by Robin Kenyatta
- Released: 1973
- Recorded: August 15, October 24–27 and November 3, 1972, and February 7, 1973
- Studio: The Hit Factory, New York City
- Genre: Jazz
- Label: Atlantic; SD 1633
- Producer: Michael Cuscuna

Robin Kenyatta chronology
Free State Band (1972)	Gypsy Man (1973)	Terra Nova (1974)

Gypsy Man is an album by saxophonist Robin Kenyatta released on the Atlantic label in 1973.

== Reception ==
Professional ratings
Review scores
Source	Rating
Allmusic	4/5 stars

In his review for Allmusic, Thom Jurek stated "Gypsy Man stands out mightily as one of the great jazz-funk outings of the '70s; it is an all but forgotten jazz classic".

== Track listing ==
All compositions by Robin Kenyatta except as indicated

1. "Last Tango in Paris" (Gato Barbieri) – 4:50
2. "Another Freight Train" – 3:36
3. "Werewolf" (Robert W. McPherson) – 4:27
4. "Reflective Silence" – 5:20
5. "Seems So Long" (Stevie Wonder) – 3:53
6. "Gypsy Man" – 5:23
7. "Melodie Chinoise" – 5:46
8. "I've Got Dreams to Remember" (Otis Redding, Zelma Redding) – 6:15

== Personnel ==
- Robin Kenyatta – alto saxophone, soprano saxophone, flute
- Pat Rebillot, George Butcher – piano, organ
- Larry Willis – electric piano
- Keith Loving, Skip Pitts, David Spinozza, Jimmy Wood – guitar
- Stanley Clarke – bass, electric bass
- Billy Cobham, Charles Collins, Ray Lucas, Rick Marotta – drums
- Ralph MacDonald – percussion
- Al Deville – trumpet (track 6)
- George Patterson, Jack Philpot, Seldon Powell – saxophone (track 6)
- Don Belamy (track 1), Lalome Washburn (track 5) – vocals
