= Numatik Swing Band =

Live album by Roswell Rudd & The Jazz Composer's Orchestra
- Released: 1973
- Recorded: July 6, 1973
- Genre: Free jazz
- Label: JCOA
- Producer: Roswell Rudd & The Jazz Composer's Orchestra

Roswell Rudd chronology
Roswell Rudd (1971)	Numatik Swing Band (1973)	Flexible Flyer (1975)

Jazz Composer's Orchestra chronology
Relativity Suite (1973)	Numatik Swing Band (1973)	The Gardens of Harlem (1975)

Numatik Swing Band is a live album by Roswell Rudd and the Jazz Composer's Orchestra released on the JCOA label in 1973.

== Reception ==
Professional ratings
Review scores
Source	Rating
AllMusic	4/5 stars

The AllMusic review by Scott Yanow awarded the album 4 stars stating "The music on this date is avant-garde, but has its melodic and accessible sections".

The authors of The Harmony Illustrated Encyclopedia of Jazz wrote that the album "shows [Rudd's] concern for textures, French horns rising over drum beat, piano and basses in unison, the scampering piccolo. Rudd himself plays well but the star of the session is drummer Beaver Harris, tirelessly inventive."

Trombonist and composer Jacob Garchik wrote: "Fascinating writing for a 25 piece large ensemble, another one of his under-explored talents! And consequently another obscure, impossible to find record, his third as a leader. Perhaps in a parallel universe we would be reverentially talking about him as a big band composer."

In an article for One Final Note, David Dupont called the album "Rudd's tribute to the art of wind playing," and noted: "Over four of its five movements, Rudd explores the continuing implications of humanity's discovery that such beautiful noise can be made by blowing into hollow devices." He commented: "The recording showed his more adventurous side... and it featured one of the masterpieces of Rudd's career: The solo on the 'Circulation' movement. As that solo built to its climax, Rudd turned a perfectly formed lyrical gem—so perfect, I always assumed it was part of the composition."

== Track listing ==
All compositions by Roswell Rudd

1. "Vent" – 4:50
2. "Breathahoward" – 2:52
3. "Circulation" – 10:15
4. "Lullaby For Greg" (lyrics by Rudd, Barry Galbraith, & Sheila Jordan) – 11:10
5. "Aerosphere" – 14:15

Recorded at New York University's Loeb Student Center on July 6, 1973.

== Personnel ==
- Roswell Rudd – trombone, French horn, producer
- Enrico Rava, Michael Krasnov, Mike Lawrence, Charles Sullivan – trumpet
- Janet Donaruma, Jeffrey Schlegel, Sharon Freeman – French horn
- Art Baron, Gary Brooks – trombone
- Perry Robinson – clarinet
- Dewey Redman – clarinet, tenor saxophone
- Martin Alter – flute, oboe, alto saxophone
- Carlos Ward – flute, alto saxophone
- Mike Bresler – piccolo, flute, soprano saxophone
- Charles Davis – soprano saxophone, baritone saxophone
- Howard Johnson, Bob Stewart – tuba
- Hod O'Brien – piano
- Charlie Haden, Sirone – bass
- Lou Grassi (track 4), Beaver Harris – drums
- Sue Evans, Dan Johnson (track 5) – percussion
- Sheila Jordan – vocals
