= Communication (Jazz Composer's Orchestra album) =

Live album by Jazz Composer's Orchestra
- Released: 1965
- Recorded: December 29, 1964 & April 10, 1965
- Venue: Judson Hall and Contemporary Center, New York City
- Genre: Free jazz
- Length: 40:18
- Label: Fontana

Jazz Composers Orchestra chronology
Communication (1965)	The Jazz Composer's Orchestra (1968)

Carla Bley chronology
Communication (1965)	Jazz Realities (1966)

Communication is the debut album by the Jazz Composer's Orchestra featuring compositions by Michael Mantler and Carla Bley performed by Paul Bley, Steve Lacy, Jimmy Lyons, Roswell Rudd, Archie Shepp, John Tchicai, Fred Pirtle, Willie Ruff, Ken McIntyre, Robin Kenyatta, Bob Carducci, Kent Carter, Steve Swallow, Milford Graves, and Barry Altschul. The album was released on the Fontana label in 1965. AllMusic described it as "one of the masterpieces of creative music in the '60s".

== Track listing ==
1. "Roast" (Carla Bley) - 11:49
2. "Day (Communications No. 4)" (Michael Mantler) - 2:25
3. "Day (Communications No. 5)" (Michael Mantler) - 24:55

Recorded at Judson Hall, New York City, December 29, 1964 (track 1) and the Contemporary Center, New York City, April 10, 1965 (tracks 2 & 3).

== Personnel ==
- Michael Mantler - Trumpet
- Roswell Rudd - Trombone
- Steve Lacy - Soprano saxophone
- Jimmy Lyons - Alto saxophone
- Fred Pirtle - Baritone saxophone
- Paul Bley - Piano
- Willie Ruff - French horn (track 1)
- John Tchicai - Alto saxophone (track 1)
- Archie Shepp - Tenor saxophone (track 1)
- Eddie Gómez - Bass (track 1)
- Milford Graves - Drums (track 1)
- Ray Codrington - Trumpet (tracks 2 & 3)
- Robin Kenyatta, Ken McIntyre - Alto saxophone (tracks 2 & 3)
- Bob Carducci - Tenor saxophone (tracks 2 & 3)
- Kent Carter, Steve Swallow - Bass (tracks 2 & 3)
- Barry Altschul - Drums (tracks 2 & 3)
