= Blown Bone =

Studio album by Roswell Rudd
- Released: 1979
- Recorded: March 27–28, 1976
- Studio: Blue Rock Studios, New York City
- Genre: Jazz
- Label: Philips; RJ-7490; Emanem Records; 4131

Roswell Rudd chronology
Sharing (1978)	Blown Bone (1979)	The Definitive Roswell Rudd (1979)

2006 CD reissue cover

Blown Bone is an album by trombonist Roswell Rudd. It was recorded in March 1976 at Blue Rock Studios in New York City, and was released on LP by Philips Japan in 1979. On the album, Rudd is joined by clarinetist Kenny Davern, saxophonists Steve Lacy and Tyrone Washington, trumpeter Enrico Rava, vocalist Sheila Jordan, pianist Patti Bown, guitarist and vocalist Louisiana Red, bassist Wilbur Little, and drummers Jordan Steckel and Paul Motian. The album was reissued on CD by Emanem Records in 2006 with a different track sequence, and with an additional track recorded in 1967 featuring another ensemble.

According to Rudd, "Blown Bone," "Cement Blues," "Street Walking," and "Bethesda Fountain" formed a suite titled "Blown Bone," dating back to the late 1960s, and about "New York City and the beauty, the energy, and the struggle." "It's Happening" was part of a suite from the mid-1970s that was dedicated to Albert Ayler, while "Blues For the Planet Earth" and "You Blew It" were a reaction to "garbage scows polluting New York Harbor."

In the CD reissue liner notes, Rudd reflected: "the players on this album just happened to be available on these two days... The chances of getting all these people together at one time would be one in a million and this was that time... the players and the music converged in a way that made it noumenal."

== Reception ==
Professional ratings
Review scores
Source	Rating
All About Jazz	4.5/5 stars
The Penguin Guide to Jazz	4/4 stars

In a review for All About Jazz, John Eyles called the album "a little lost gem," and wrote: "Central to the album's success are the quality of the band and the quality of Rudd's writing and arranging. The band brims over with talent... Every member of the band is on top form; no one disappoints... Impressively, this album manages to integrate seemingly diverse elements into a coherent and highly listenable totality." In a separate AAJ review of the 2006 reissue, Clifford Allen commented: "Blown Bone cements the breadth and diversity of Rudd's art... It's a shame, though, that such a telling document as this was virtually buried until almost thirty years after its initial release."

The authors of the Penguin Guide to Jazz Recordings awarded the album 4 stars, and singled out "It's Happening" for praise, stating that it is "almost worth the whole set," and expressing admiration for "a completely outrageous Lacy solo which seems to use the entire range of the horn."

Dan Warburton, writing for Paris Transatlantic, called the group a "stellar 1976 pick-up band," and stated: "Not a great album but a darn good one."

Dusted Magazine's Derek Taylor remarked: "Rudd has always been about placing his slippery slide-calibrated brass in unexpected contexts. This consistently entertaining hodgepodge doesn't disappoint a whit on that score... More please."

== Track listings ==
All compositions by Roswell Rudd.

=== 1979 LP release ===
Track timings not provided.

1. "Bethesda Fountain"
2. "Street Walking"
3. "Blues For the Planet Earth"
4. "You Blew It"
5. "Cement Blues – part 1"
6. "Blown Bone"
7. "Cement Blues – part 2"
8. "It's Happening"
- Tracks 1, 2, 5, 6, and 7 recorded on March 27, 1976, at Blue Rock Studios in New York City. Tracks 3, 4, and 8 recorded on March 28, 1976, at Blue Rock Studios in New York City.

=== 2006 CD release ===
1. "It's Happening" – 10:59
2. "Blues For the Planet Earth" – 3:57
3. "You Blew It" – 5:35
4. "Long Hope" – 4:27
5. "Blown Bone" – 3:32
6. "Cement Blues" – 8:55
7. "Street Walking" – 2:21
8. "Bethesda Fountain" – 11:08
- Tracks 1–3 recorded on March 28, 1976, at Blue Rock Studios in New York City. Track 4 recorded in September 1967 at Downeast Studio in New York City. Tracks 5–8 Recorded on March 27, 1976, at Blue Rock Studios in New York City.

== Personnel ==
=== 1979 LP release ===
- Roswell Rudd – trombone, mbira, sanza, percussion
- Kenny Davern – clarinet, soprano saxophone (tracks 1, 2, 5, 6, and 7)
- Steve Lacy – soprano saxophone, percussion
- Tyrone Washington – tenor saxophone (tracks 1, 2, 5, 6, and 7)
- Enrico Rava – trumpet (tracks 3, 4, and 8)
- Sheila Jordan – vocals (tracks 3 and 4)
- Patti Bown – electric piano (tracks 1, 2, 5, 6, and 7)
- Louisiana Red – guitar, vocals (tracks 5 and 7)
- Wilbur Little – double bass
- Jordan Steckel – bata drum (track 1)
- Paul Motian – drums

=== 2006 CD release ===
Tracks 1–3

- Roswell Rudd – trombone, mbira, sanza, percussionne, misc perc
- Enrico Rava – trumpet
- Steve Lacy – soprano saxophone, percussion
- Wilbur Little – double bass
- Paul Motian – drums
- Sheila Jordan – vocals (tracks 2 and 3)

Track 4

- Roswell Rudd – piano
- Robin Kenyatta – alto saxophone
- Karl Berger – vibraphone
- Lewis Worrell – double bass
- Richard Youngstein – double bass
- Horace Arnold – drums

Tracks 5–8

- Roswell Rudd – trombone, mbira, sanza, percussionne, misc perc
- Kenny Davern – clarinet, soprano saxophone
- Steve Lacy – soprano saxophone, percussion
- Tyrone Washington – tenor saxophone
- Patti Bown – electric piano
- Wilbur Little – double bass
- Paul Motian – drums
- Louisiana Red – guitar, vocals (track 6)
- Jordan Steckel – bata drum (track 8)
