= Inside Job (Roswell Rudd album) =

Live album by Roswell Rudd
- Released: 1976
- Recorded: May 21, 1976
- Venue: Studio Rivbea, New York City
- Genre: Free jazz
- Label: Freedom; AL 1029
- Producer: Michael Cuscuna

Roswell Rudd chronology
Flexible Flyer (1975)	Inside Job (1976)	Sharing (1978)

Inside Job is a live album by trombonist Roswell Rudd. It was recorded on May 21, 1976, at Sam Rivers' Studio Rivbea in New York City, and was released later that year by Freedom Records. On the album, Rudd is joined by trumpeter Enrico Rava, pianist Dave Burrell, bassist Stafford James, and drummer Harold White.

Inside Job was recorded during the loft jazz festival documented on Wildflowers: The New York Loft Jazz Sessions.

== Reception ==
Professional ratings
Review scores
Source	Rating
AllMusic	3/5 stars
The Encyclopedia of Popular Music	3/5 stars
The Virgin Encyclopedia of Jazz	3/5 stars

In a review for AllMusic, Ron Wynn described the album as a "solid quintet date."

Jacob Garchik, writing for Ethan Iverson's web site, noted that, in comparison with Rudd's previous releases, "Mysterioso" finds him "really playing quite inside, with a more grounded vocabulary, but still with his characteristic bravado and inventiveness."

Author Todd S. Jenkins stated that the album has an "aura of relaxed inventiveness."

== Track listings ==
1. "Sacred Song" (Roswell Rudd) – 8:01
2. "Mysterioso" (Thelonious Monk) – 7:42
3. "Inside Job" (Roswell Rudd) – 16:26

== Personnel ==
- Roswell Rudd – trombone
- Enrico Rava – trumpet
- Dave Burrell – piano
- Stafford James – acoustic bass
- Harold White – drums
