= Old Stuff =

Live album by New York Art Quartet
- Released: 2010
- Recorded: October 14 and 24, 1965
- Venue: Montmartre Jazzhus and Concert Hall of the Radio House, Danish Broadcasting Corporation, Copenhagen, Denmark
- Genre: Free jazz
- Label: Cuneiform Records

New York Art Quartet chronology
| 35th Reunion (2000) | Old Stuff (2010) | Call It Art (2013) |

Old Stuff is the fourth album by the New York Art Quartet. It was recorded live at the Montmartre Jazzhus and Concert Hall of the Radio House, Danish Broadcasting on October 14 and 24, 1965, and was released in 2010 by Cuneiform Records. It features John Tchicai on alto saxophone, Roswell Rudd on trombone, Finn Von Eyben on bass, and Louis Moholo on drums.

In the fall of 1965, Tchicai lined up dates for the NYAQ in Copenhagen, Gothenburg (Sweden), Hilversum (Holland), and Amsterdam (where they opened for Ornette Coleman's group), with Von Eyben and Moholo substituting for Reggie Workman and Milford Graves, who were unavailable. Recordings from two of the Copenhagen dates appear on Old Stuff. An unauthorized recording of music from Hilversum was released on the French label America Records in 1971 with the title Roswell Rudd.

== Reception ==
Professional ratings
Review scores
| Source | Rating |
|---|---|
| AllMusic | 4/5 stars |
| DownBeat | 4/5 stars |
| All About Jazz #1 | 4/5 stars |
| All About Jazz #2 | 5/5 stars |
| The Village Voice | A− |

In a review for AllMusic, James Allen wrote: "the band's two Copenhagen gigs find them firing on all cylinders. Only a couple of tunes... are reprised from the studio albums, but Rudd and Tchicai brought a hot batch of new pieces with them, as well as an artful deconstruction of Thelonious Monk's 'Pannonica.' Rudd's forceful, searching lines move in and around the darting, visceral sax stings of Tchicai in a dance that's both elegant and explosive, suggesting how much more they could have done if they had remained a team. Moholo and von Eyben bring a new feeling to the group, with the latter alternating between perky walking lines and in-your-face flurries of frenzied notes as the moment demands, and Moholo displaying the coloristic skills that would make him a legend of U.K. jazz in the years to come. Barring a one-off reunion decades later, these would be the New York Art Quartet's last recordings, as they went their separate ways shortly after the Denmark stint, but Old Stuff illuminates a whole new chapter in the Art Quartet's story, a chapter most folks never knew existed."

Bill Meyer, in a review for DownBeat, stated that, in relation to the original NYAQ lineup, the group on Old Stuff "isn't as challenging, but just as exciting. They negotiate the twisty tunes on this set... with even greater panache, spicing their solos with a dash of ribald humor... bassist Finn von Eyben and... drummer Louis Moholo's more time-based rhythms give the music a less fractured feel."

Writing for All About Jazz, Troy Collins commented: "Old Stuff helps reinforce the quartet's place in history as a cutting-edge ensemble... Culled from two live radio broadcasts..., this collection presents the quartet in front of an enthusiastic audience, capturing their freewheeling interplay... Old Stuff fills a gap in the discography of one of the most important, under-documented groups to come out of the October Revolution."

In a separate review for All About Jazz, Nic Jones stated: "Old Stuff it might be, but the music still resonates with extraordinary vitality. We would be spoiled indeed if music was caught at such seminal moments as this more often, but the fact that it isn't adds further luster to something that's already very special."

== Track listing ==
1. "Rosmosis" (Rudd) - 15:47
2. "Sweet Smells" (Tchicai) - 6:22
3. "Old Stuff" (Rudd) - 7:18
4. "Pannonica" (Thelonious Monk) - 3:02
5. "Kvintus T" (Tchicai) - 2:52
6. "Pa Tirsdag" (Tchicai) - 5:51
7. "Old Stuff" (Rudd) - 8:11
8. "Cool Eyes" (Tchicai) - 7:28
9. "Sweet V" (Rudd) - 2:29
10. "Karin's Blues" (Rudd) - 6:20
11. "Kirsten" (Tchicai) - 5:32

Tracks 1–6 recorded at the Montmartre Jazzhus, Copenhagen, Denmark on October 14, 1965. Tracks 7–11 recorded at the Concert Hall of the Radio House, Danish Broadcasting Corporation, Copenhagen, Denmark on October 24, 1965.

== Personnel ==
- John Tchicai – alto saxophone
- Roswell Rudd – trombone
- Finn Von Eyben – bass
- Louis Moholo – drums
