= Big Chief Dreaming =

2005 studio jazz album

Studio album by John Tchicai, Garrison Fewell, Tino Tracanna, Paolino Dalla Porta, and Massimo Manzi
- Released: 2005
- Recorded: June 15–16, 2003
- Studio: Cavo Studio, Bergamo, Italy
- Genre: Jazz
- Length: 51:38
- Label: Soul Note; 121385-2

Dudu Pukwana chronology
John Tchicai with Strings (2005)	Big Chief Dreaming (2005)	Hymne til Sofia (2005)

Big Chief Dreaming is an album by saxophonists John Tchicai and Tino Tracanna, guitarist Garrison Fewell, double bassist Paolino Dalla Porta, and drummer Massimo Manzi. It was recorded on June 15 and 16, 2003, at Cavo Studio in Bergamo, Italy, and was released in 2005 by the Soul Note label.

== Reception ==
Professional ratings
Review scores
Source	Rating
All About Jazz	4.5/5 stars
All About Jazz	4.5/5 stars
AllMusic	4/5 stars
The Penguin Guide to Jazz	3/4 stars
Tom Hull – on the Web	B+

In a review for AllMusic, Scott Yanow wrote: "The music tends to be tightly controlled, hinting at 1950s West Coast jazz while being a bit more modern. Tchicai... is in excellent if laid-back form. Several of the songs... deserve to be covered by other musicians. Recommended."

The authors of The Penguin Guide to Jazz Recordings stated: "The music is quite accommodating, and slightly retro in feel, but the original writing... is a nice balance of tradition and innovation."

Dennis Hollingsworth of All About Jazz noted: "the instruments are precisely delivered and well-balanced. Each tune is marked by freshness and outstanding musicianship, making this date worthy of deliberate attention and extended listening." AAJ's Jerry D'Souza commented: "Inspiration is forged on the empathy of the musicians, and all five pick up that invisible emotional thread and weave it into appealing patterns. They do so with a quiet demeanour, a tonal delectability that gently inveigles the senses."

Writing for JazzTimes, Chris Kelsey described the album as "an unusual mixture of leftward-leaning (if not quite free) jazz by a multicultural cooperative," and remarked: "Everyone minds his manners. There's not much peering out over the precipice. Still, there's some good stuff, and it's always a treat to hear Tchicai."

In an article for Point of Departure, Bill Shoemaker stated that the music is characterized by "a folk music-informed lyricism, smart approaches to structure, and a swing feel that doesn't lose its suppleness with increases of heat." He wrote: "Though the materials range from Ornettish dirges to puckish, Monk-inspired romps and workouts driven by oddly accented grooves, the quintet has an appealing, quietly urgent temperament that coheres the date."

One Final Note's Dan Rose commented: "Like no other album to come across my desk this year, this one demands to be heard again and again. It unfolds over time and reveals no small charms. Tchicai and company make an evocative team. They also bring the scorched earth of free jazz back to life with a flower or two."

== Track listing ==
1. "Instant Intuition" (Garrison Fewell / Garrison Tracanna) – 2:05
2. "Prayer for Right Guidance" (John Tchicai) – 4:58
3. "Big Chief Dreaming" (John Tchicai / Garrison Fewell) – 2:53
4. "Simplicity" (Tino Tracanna) – 7:14
5. "The Queen of Ra" (Garrison Fewell) – 7:09
6. "Thrift Shopping + Extension" (John Tchicai) – 4:38
7. "Basetto" (Tino Tracanna) – 5:19
8. "X-Ray Vision" (Garrison Fewell) – 4:28
9. "Grappa to Go" (Fewell / Tracanna) – 2:50
10. "Splinters No. 1" (Manzi / Tracanna) – 2:03
11. "Haengende Skaerm" (John Tchicai) – 3:22
12. "Yogi in Disguise" (John Tchicai) – 4:48

== Personnel ==
- John Tchicai – tenor saxophone, bass clarinet
- Garrison Fewell – guitar
- Tino Tracanna – soprano saxophone, tenor saxophone
- Paolino Dalla Porta – double bass
- Massimo Manzi – drums
