= Willi the Pig =

Willi the Pig: Live at the Willisau Jazz Festival

Live album by John Tchicai–Irène Schweizer Group
- Released: 1976
- Recorded: August 30, 1975
- Venue: Willisau Jazz Festival, Willisau, Switzerland
- Genre: Free jazz
- Label: Willisau Live Records; WIL-1
- Producer: Niklaus Troxler

John Tchicai chronology
Afrodisiaca (1969)	Willi the Pig: Live at the Willisau Jazz Festival (1976)	Darktown Highlights (1977)

Willi the Pig: Live at the Willisau Jazz Festival is a live album by the John Tchicai–Irène Schweizer Group, led by saxophonist Tchicai and pianist Schweizer, who are joined by bassist Buschi Niebergall, and drummer Makaya Ntshoko. Featuring a single, 46-minute performance, it was recorded on August 30, 1975, at the Willisau Jazz Festival in Willisau, Switzerland, and was released on vinyl in limited quantities in 1976 by Willisau Live Records. In 2000, the album was reissued on CD by Atavistic Records as part of their Unheard Music Series.

== Reception ==
Professional ratings
Review scores
Source	Rating
AllMusic	2.5/5 stars
Tom Hull – on the Web	A−
The Virgin Encyclopedia of Jazz	3/5 stars

In a review for AllMusic, William York described the music as "quietly (and occasionally not so quietly) intense free jazz that, despite some turbulent moments, never becomes fully explosive or over the top," and praised the "stellar interplay" of the musicians, as well as the presence of "moments of reflective, almost meditative beauty."

Harvey Pekar of JazzTimes called the performance "very coherent," noting the fact that Tchicai pays "attention to things like motivic development," while Schweizer "develops her ideas intelligently."

Writing for All About Jazz, Derek Taylor wrote: "countless moments of brilliant and inspired invention crop up... Whether the quartet had other opportunities to record is unclear, but what is a certainty is that their work here is well deserving of the careful and reverential treatment afforded by the folks at Unheard." Another AAJ reviewer called the album "an unusually fresh-sounding spontaneous improvisation," and commented: "The particularly satisfying feature of this performance is the way Tchicai and Schweizer coordinate their playing to bring the improvisation to a higher level."

Exclaim!'s David Dacks stated that Tchicai "spends more than 20 minutes in the uppermost octaves of the soprano without sounding strident, then goes on to create soulful sounds with the lower register of his alto," while Schweizer "tears into solo statements that recall Lennie Tristano and Bill Evans."

A writer for La Folia described Niebergall and Ntshoko as "excellent partners," and remarked: "High energy doesn't always mean loud and fast. Another must-have."

== Track listing ==
1. "Willi the Pig, Part 1" – 24:26
2. "Willi the Pig, Part 2" – 21:58

== Personnel ==
- John Tchicai – alto saxophone, soprano saxophone, piano
- Irène Schweizer – piano
- Buschi Niebergall – bass
- Makaya Ntshoko – drums
