= Jazz Realities =

Studio album by Carla Bley, Michael Mantler & Steve Lacy
- Released: 1966
- Recorded: January 11, 1966
- Genre: Jazz
- Length: 38:07
- Label: Fontana

Carla Bley chronology
Communication (1965)	Jazz Realities (1966)	Escalator Over the Hill (1968)

Michael Mantler chronology
Communication (1965)	Jazz Realities (1966)	The Jazz Composer's Orchestra (1968)

Jazz Realities is an album by Carla Bley, Michael Mantler and Steve Lacy with Kent Carter and Aldo Romano. The album was released on the Fontana label in 1966.

== Reception ==
The Allmusic review awarded the album 3 stars.

Professional ratings
Review scores
Source	Rating
Allmusic	3/5 stars

== Track listing ==
All compositions by Carla Bley except as indicated

1. "Doctor" - 7:45
2. "Oni Puladi" - 5:25
3. "J.S." (Michael Mantler, Carla Bley) - 3:35
4. "Walking Batterie Woman" (Carla Bley, Michael Mantler) - 6:18
5. "Closer" - 5:30
6. "Communications No.7" (Michael Mantler) - 9:34

Recorded in Baarn, Holland on January 11, 1966.

== Personnel ==
- Carla Bley - piano
- Michael Mantler - trumpet
- Steve Lacy - soprano saxophone
- Kent Carter - bass
- Aldo Romano - drums
