= Call It Art =

Box set by New York Art Quartet
- Released: 2013
- Recorded: 1964–1965
- Venue: various
- Genre: Jazz
- Label: Triple Point Records; TPR 161

New York Art Quartet chronology
Old Stuff (2010)	Call It Art (2013)

Call It Art is an album by the New York Art Quartet. It contains previously unissued live and studio tracks recorded in 1964 and 1965, and was released in limited quantities as a five-LP box set by Triple Point Records in 2013. The album includes a 156-page clothbound book containing liner notes by Ben Young, photos, reproductions of manuscripts, and a complete history and itinerary of the group, housed in a custom wooden box. Musicians featured on the album are saxophonist John Tchicai, trombonist Roswell Rudd, bassists Bob Cunningham, Don Moore, Eddie Gómez, Lewis Worrell, and Reggie Workman, and drummers J. C. Moses and Milford Graves. Trumpeter Alan Shorter appears on several tracks, and Amiri Baraka also makes a guest appearance.

== Reception ==
The album was nominated for 2014 Grammy Awards in the "Best Album Notes" and "Best Historical Album" categories.

In a 2013 article for The New York Times, Nate Chinen wrote: "there's reason to hail Call It Art... as this year's most significant release for partisans of free jazz... These performances... capture the band's unmistakable peak, when it stood for an airier, more collectivist ideal of open improvisation than the combustible norm at the time. There's a sleek, furtive magic in the interplay between Mr. Tchicai and Mr. Rudd, and something just as bewitching in the abstract polyrhythms of Mr. Graves. Maybe it's fitting that music so far on the margins would be available only as a collector's splurge, but the level of artistry here begs for broader exposure." In a separate article for WBGO, Chinen stated that the album "further solidified the band's stature as a visionary unit in the avant-garde."

Clifford Allen, writing for Point of Departure, called the album "an extraordinary, redefining set," and commented: "the WBAI session is a valuable expansion on the NYAQ's work with Jones' poetry and captures a tense, volatile aspect of the music rarely heard elsewhere... Call It Art is a reaffirmation of what they did together for a time, however brief that might have been."

In a review for The New York City Jazz Record, Andrey Henkin wrote: "The New York Art Quartet suffered in reputation next to other bands of the period... It only took nearly half a century but with Call It Art, the NYAQ has finally gotten the treatment it deserves."

Michael J. West, writing for Jazz Times, remarked: "Collectors will drool... The musical content is odds-and-ends stuff... Most of it is quite good, including a number of pieces that the NYAQ never otherwise recorded. The band shines: Graves is particularly brilliant as a frontline drummer with percussive color, while Rudd and Tchicai demonstrate remarkable sensitivity to each other's sounds."

Tom Hull wrote: "Hard for me to evaluate -- among other things I'm no longer accustomed to 15-20 minute chunks -- but everything I play has its fascinating points."

== Track listing ==
=== Disc 1 ===
1. "Banging on the White House Door" (Rudd) – 6:29
2. "Rosmosis" (Rudd) – 16:39
3. "Uh-Oh" (collective composition) – 12:31
4. "No. 6" (Tchicai) – 8:11
- Track 1 recorded on July 16, 1965, at Van Gelder Studio in Englewood Cliffs, New Jersey. Tracks 2–4 recorded on December 31, 1964, at Judson Hall in New York City as part of the "Four Days in December" series.

=== Disc 2 ===
1. "Old Stuff" (Rudd) – 10:28
2. "Asprokhaliko" (Rudd) – 4:24
3. "Spoken introduction by Amiri Baraka" – 0:17
4. "Ballad Theta" (Tchicai) (includes the poem "Western Front" by Amiri Baraka) – 7:45
5. "Now's the Time" (Charlie Parker) – 7:31
6. "Old Stuff" (Rudd) (includes the poems "Bad Mouth" and "In One Battle" by Amiri Baraka) – 10:22
7. "No. 6" (Tchicai) – 6:38
8. "Closing announcement" – 0:32
- Tracks 1–2 recorded on December 31, 1964, at Judson Hall in New York City as part of the "Four Days in December" series. Tracks 3–8 recorded on January 17, 1965, at WBAI Studios in New York City.

=== Disc 3 ===
1. "Sweet V" (Rudd) (breakdown) – 1:36
2. "Sweet V" (Rudd) (complete take) – 8:26
3. "Nettus II" (Tchicai) (warm-up/false start/breakdown/false start/incomplete) – 1:16
4. "Nettus II" (Tchicai) (nearly complete take) – 10:48
5. "For Eric: Memento Mori" (Tchicai) (warm-up/false start/take 1) – 1:32
6. "For Eric: Memento Mori" (Tchicai) (complete/take 2) – 8:26
7. "For Eric: Memento Mori" (Tchicai) (complete/take 3) – 10:31
8. "Eventuality" (Rudd) (incomplete) – 5:50
- Probably recorded in early 1965 at the loft of Michael Snow in New York City.

=== Disc 4 ===
1. "Quintus T." (Tchicai) – 2:39
2. "Mohawk" (Charlie Parker) – 3:42
3. "Sweet V" (Rudd) – 3:23
4. "Banging on the White House Door" (Rudd) – 6:38
5. "For Eric: Memento Mori" (Tchicai) – 12:40
6. "Uh-Oh" (collective composition) – 26:58
- Tracks 1–4 recorded on July 15, 1965, at the Museum of Modern Art in New York City. Tracks 5–6 recorded on October 31, 1964, at the loft of Marzette Watts in New York City.

=== Disc 5 ===
1. "O.C." (Ornette Coleman) – 14:12
2. "Ballad Theta" (Tchicai) – 10:08
3. "No. 6" (Tchicai) – 22:17
- Recorded on October 31, 1964, at the loft of Marzette Watts in New York City.

== Personnel ==
- John Tchicai – alto saxophone
- Roswell Rudd – trombone, euphonium
- Bob Cunningham – bass (disc 3)
- Don Moore – bass (disc 1, tracks 2–4; disc 2, tracks 1–2)
- Eddie Gómez – bass (disc 2, tracks 4–7)
- Lewis Worrell – bass (disc 4, tracks 5–6; disc 5)
- Reggie Workman – bass (disc 1, track 1; disc 4, tracks 1–4)
- J. C. Moses – drums (disc 4, track 6; disc 5, track 1)
- Milford Graves – drums, conga, voice
- Alan Shorter – trumpet (disc 4, track 6; disc 5, track 2)
- Amiri Baraka – recitation (disc 2, tracks 4 and 6)
