= New York Art Quartet (album) =

Studio album by New York Art Quartet
- Released: 1965
- Recorded: November 26, 1964
- Studio: Bell Sound (New York City)
- Genre: Free jazz
- Label: ESP-Disk

New York Art Quartet chronology
New York Art Quartet (1965)	Mohawk (1965)

New York Art Quartet is the debut album by the group of the same name. It was recorded on November 26, 1964, at Bell Sound Studios in New York City, and was released in 1965 by ESP-Disk as the fourth item in their catalog, following Albert Ayler's Spiritual Unity and Pharoah Sanders's Pharoah's First. It features John Tchicai on alto saxophone, Roswell Rudd on trombone, Lewis Worrell on bass, and Milford Graves on percussion. In addition, LeRoi Jones recites his controversial poem "Black Dada Nihilismus" on one track.

The album was recorded roughly two months after the group, calling itself "The John Tchicai Quartet," participated in the "October Revolution in Jazz" festival organized by Bill Dixon, and roughly one month before they played in the "Four Days in December" festival, where, calling themselves the "Roswell Rudd - John Tchicai Quartet," they shared a bill with Sun Ra.

== Reception ==
Professional ratings
Review scores
Source	Rating
AllMusic	4/5 stars
Down Beat	4.5/5 stars
The Penguin Guide to Jazz	3/4 stars

In a review for AllMusic, Al Campbell wrote: "The unique front-line horn arrangement of trombonist Roswell Rudd and Danish alto saxophonist John Tchicai weaves rapid intricate lines around Lewis Worrell's bass and the frenzied drums of Milford Graves. Poet Leroi Jones (now Amiri Baraka) is added to the quartet for his revolutionary/militant spoken word diatribe "Black Dada Nihilismus." While it may sound like an intrusion to some listeners, it must be kept in mind that Jones was an active participant in the early avant-garde scene of New York, making his contribution to this disc vital in capturing the radical surroundings in which the music thrived."

Writing for All About Jazz, Clifford Allen commented: "Cooking through contradiction, the New York Art Quartet cut some of the most powerful music in the free jazz underground," and praised Graves' drumming, stating: "Graves is defiantly in his own orbit. Rather than providing a canvas to free the soloist a la Sunny Murray, Graves is impulsive and either ignores or counteracts the soloist with non-isometric phrases, creating tension through non-unison collectivity. Yet there's propulsion and swing by dint of disparity, a pulse that's kinetic even if it's multidirectional." Regarding the inclusion of "Black Dada Nihilismus", Allen wrote: "'Nihilismus' is a beat follow-up to Eliot's 'The Wasteland' in the clothes of mid-60s New York, 'cool' as dead, disheartened and disaffected with no place in any artistic or racial community, yet somehow affirming singularity as solitude. In a way, the inclusion of Baraka's (Jones) poem perfectly mirrors the in-betweenness of the group, who certainly had grand claims as to their music as art-music, creative and experimental, but whose approach to that very artfulness was always brusque and extremely 'street'."

Michael Nelson, in an article for Stereogum, remarked: "The group... made music that was radically different from the free jazz of the time. It was much more sparse and spacious, almost like chamber music — Worrell's bowed bass had the emotional resonance of a cello, and behind him, Graves' drumming was free but highly complex and intuitive. His sticks landed like snow flurries, drifting across the kit in skittering rushes, never worrying about timekeeping but focused on an overall vitality and energy... The horn players stayed away from volcanic solos, instead allowing their lines to unfold slowly, and interacting with each other like they were composing funeral hymns on the spot. And on the second track, 'Black Dada Nihilismus,' they stepped away entirely, allowing poet Amiri Baraka to take the microphone with Worrell and Graves surging and rippling behind him. Living up to their name, the New York Art Quartet proved that free jazz could be subtle and artistic beyond the superficial fire and fury that was its image with the broader public."

David Toop described the group's sound on the album as "deliberately ragged, bleary themes tumbling out in spasms, notes tailing away as if lost to daydream, the music so open that total collapse seems perpetually imminent... quite unlike the music of their peers."

== Track listing ==
1. "Short" (Rudd) - 8:20
2. "Sweet" (Rudd) / "Black Dada Nihilismus" (LeRoi Jones) - 12:10
3. "Rosmosis" (Rudd) - 14:48
4. "No. 6" (Tchicai) - 8:07

Recorded on November 26, 1964, at Bell Sound Studios in New York City.

== Personnel ==
- John Tchicai – alto saxophone
- Roswell Rudd – trombone
- Lewis Worrell – bass
- Milford Graves – percussion
- LeRoi Jones – recitation on "Black Dada Nihilismus"
