= Flexible Flyer (album) =

Studio album by Roswell Rudd
- Released: 1975
- Recorded: March 1974
- Studio: Blue Rock Studios, New York City
- Genre: Jazz
- Label: Freedom; AL 1006
- Producer: Moselle Galbraith

Roswell Rudd chronology
Numatik Swing Band (1973)	Flexible Flyer (1975)	Inside Job (1976)

Flexible Flyer is an album by trombonist Roswell Rudd. It was recorded in March 1974 at Blue Rock Studios in New York City, and was released in 1975 by Freedom Records. On the album, Rudd is joined by vocalist Sheila Jordan, pianist Hod O'Brien, bassist Arild Andersen, and drummer Barry Altschul.

== Reception ==
Professional ratings
Review scores
Source	Rating
AllMusic	4/5 stars

In a review for AllMusic, Scott Yanow wrote: "The trombonist plays quite well; the rhythm section is tight yet adventurous; and the use of Jordan (who also has some individual spots) as part of some of the ensembles helps make the date something special. Recommended."

Bill Shoemaker, writing for Jazz Times, called the album "an against-the-grain gem," and noted: "At a time when AACM and BAG artists were writing the new chapter in jazz history, Rudd moved as far away as he could from the '60s new thing that initially brought him international recognition." Shoemaker commented: "The finesse-oriented team of bassist Arild Anderson and drummer Barry Altschul was well attuned to Rudd's delicate balance of joyous swing and introspective lyricism. The result is an album that has just not stood up well over the years, but has gained gravity with the passage of time."

In a New York Magazine article, Gary Giddins stated that Rudd "casts an unexpected eye on bebop, possibly under the influence of... Hod O'Brien. The phlegmatically humorous 'Waltzing in the Sagebrush' and 'Moselle Variations' are amusing, but the more adventuresome readings of two standards are pretentious, largely due to Sheila Jordan's vocals."

== Track listing ==
1. "What Are You Doing the Rest of Your Life?" (Michel Legrand) – 5:06
2. "Maiden Voyage" (Herbie Hancock ) – 8:43
3. "Suh Blah Blah Buh Sibi" (Roswell Rudd) – 9:40
4. "Waltzing in the Sagebrush" (Hod O'Brien) – 5:34
5. "Moselle Variations: Whatever Turns You On Baby / Tuff Muffins / Moselle" (Roswell Rudd) – 16:10

== Personnel ==
- Roswell Rudd – trombone, French horn
- Sheila Jordan – vocals
- Hod O'Brien – piano
- Arild Andersen – bass
- Barry Altschul – drums
