= October Revolution in Jazz =

Jazz festival in New York City in 1964

- Poster advertising the October Revolution in Jazz
- Genre: Jazz, Free jazz
- Dates: October 1–4, 1964
- Locations: 251 West 91st Street, New York City
- Years active: 1964
- Founders: Bill Dixon
- Attendance: 700

The October Revolution in Jazz was a four-day festival of new jazz music that took place at the Cellar Café in New York City. It occurred from October 1–4, 1964, and was organized by composer and trumpeter Bill Dixon. The success of the festival was directly responsible for the formation of the Jazz Composer's Guild.

== Background ==
During a trip to Helsinki, Finland with Archie Shepp in the summer of 1962, Dixon began to develop embouchure difficulties. The situation deteriorated to the point where, by the following summer, Dixon stopped playing in public in order to focus on correcting the issue. He also began concentrating on writing and arranging. Shepp, meanwhile, began collaborating with John Tchicai, with whom he would soon form the New York Contemporary Five. Dixon composed and arranged a number of the pieces that would be performed and recorded by the NYCF, and also managed their weekly rehearsals. By early 1964, Dixon had recovered to the point where he was able to record the A-side of the album Bill Dixon 7-tette/Archie Shepp and the New York Contemporary 5, a split LP with the NYCF that came about in order to fulfill Dixon's and Shepp's contractual obligations to Savoy Records. Dixon, however, was still unhappy with his sound, and stated: "After that record date, when I started freelancing, I needed things to do to make money. I can transcribe, so I began to transcribe Savoy's gospel music to create lead sheets..."

In April 1964, while Dixon was living on 103rd Street in Manhattan and working on the gospel transcriptions, he stumbled on the Cellar Café, a coffee shop located at 251 West 91st Street. The Café, run by Peter Sabino, had opened in late February, and "was serving up an eclectic and inchoate fare of poetry, film, folk music, and jazz for an audience largely of Columbia University students." Dixon recalled: "I happened to come down to 91st Street and saw the Cellar Café. You actually went into the cellar coming off the street. I would have walked on past, but they had a sign up that read 'JAZZ TONIGHT', with the name of a very fine musician, [alto saxophonist] Bobby Brown. So I went in, and Bobby Brown never showed. That's how I met [the club's manager Peter Sabino...]" Dixon described the atmosphere as "very relaxed, like a Viennese coffee house, lots of things going on."

After discussions with Sabino, Dixon soon began arranging and producing concerts at the Café. Between May and September, 1964, Dixon staged a series of concerts at 4 p.m. on Sundays, featuring Paul Bley, the Free Form Improvisation Ensemble, Jimmy Giuffre, and Sun Ra. Dixon stated: "I had let people know when I started doing things at the Cellar that the only groups that I was interested in were those with no other place to play... if they weren't allowed to work anywhere else, the Cellar was open to them. It wasn't up to me to say that these players were either good or bad. I had to have a place where people could come and hear what the musical ferment of their time comprised." Trombonist Roswell Rudd remarked: "You know, they could pay their money and take their chances at the commercial... clubs. But at least here, they were guaranteed a taste of the unexpected, the unforeseen." Dixon also recalled: "You had to have two things to run a club successfully: you had to make it so people could afford to go to the place, and so musicians were comfortable enough to play and not bullshit the public. So right away I let musicians play as long as they wanted... So the place developed an ambience of the music being carried out with integrity." In addition, the Café allowed musicians to rehearse there during the day; according to Dixon, "There wasn't that much work at the time, but people rehearsed incessantly. Rehearsing was the work."

At this point, Dixon began planning something more substantial:

One day I went to the operator of the Cellar, Peter Sabino, and he and I came up with the idea for this thing. Sabino and I were going to go into business; we would get a liquor license and open this place as a club, and he wanted to do a concert. I told him everyone does a concert; why don't we do a week-long event, a festival? The festival was going to be an official opening for the club. We had no money, so I got on the phone. For that first festival I ran my telephone bill up to an unheard of amount of $500.00 and stalled the telephone company from turning my service off. I went one solid year without paying my rent. I owed every grocer in the West Village. I was a believer; I believed in this stuff and poured everything I could into the festival and (later) into the Guild operation.

Regarding his motivations, Dixon stated:

I did the October Revolution completely by myself – irrespective of what anyone says. I did it for a single reason. I had a point that I had to prove to people. All these writers... were telling me that this music I saw wasn't worth anything, that no one could be interested in it. I knew people could be interested in anything if it was presented to them in the proper way. I knew that. And of the people I admired who were in the first wave of this music, the only person who ever lent any moral or philosophical support for the new music was John Coltrane. The rest of them were negative or jealous; they wouldn't help us or endorse what we did..."

By the third week of September, Dixon had finalized the schedule and personnel for the four-day October Revolution in Jazz, named after the Bolshevik Revolution of 1917. This gave him time to place advance notices in newspapers such as the Columbia Daily Spectator, The Villager, and the Village Voice. The festival was also included in the concert listings of The New York Times, and was mentioned in the October 8 issue of DownBeat. Performances would begin at 4:00 p.m. each day, ending at midnight, at which point there would be panel discussions, moderated by Dixon, with topics such as "Jim Crow and Crow Jim", "The Economics of Jazz", "The Rise of Folk Music and the Decline of Jazz", and "Jazz Composition".

== Event schedule ==
The following performers appeared at the event:

=== October 1, 1964 (Thursday) ===
- Joe Maneri
- Ali Jackson Quartet
- John Tchicai/Roswell Rudd/Lewis Worrell with Milford Graves
- Paul Bley Quintet with Marshall Allen, Dewey Johnson, Eddie Gómez, and Milford Graves
- Jimmy Giuffre (unaccompanied)
- Charles Whittenberg

=== October 2, 1964 (Friday) ===
- Joe Scianni-David Izenzon
- Julian Hayter Quartet
- Martin Siegel Quartet
- Bobby Brown Quartet
- Alan Silva Trio, with (possibly) Burton Greene and Clarence Walker
- Lowell Davidson Quartet (listed on festival poster but not in Friday schedule in Dixonia)

=== October 3, 1964 (Saturday) ===
- Giuseppi Logan Trio with Lewis Worrell, Don Pullen, and Milford Graves
- Arthur Keyes Octet
- Barry Milroad Duo
- Louis Brown Quartet
- Bill Dixon Sextet with Giuseppi Logan, Bob Ralston, Gary Porter, Reggie Johnson, and Rashied Ali

=== October 4, 1964 (Sunday) ===
- Valdo Williams Trio
- Ken McIntyre Octet
- Sun Ra Sextet
- Don Heckman Octet with Don Friedman, Alan Silva, Joe Hunt, and Sheila Jordan
- Midge Pike Duo
- Robert Wales
- Free Form Improvisational Ensemble with John Winter, Gary William Friedman, Burton Greene, Alan Silva, and Clarence Walker

== Reception ==
The October Revolution was a success on a number of levels. On the afternoon of the first concert, Dixon received a call from Sabino:

[H]e says, "Bill, can you get over here right away?" I said, "Why?" He says, "Just get over here right away." So I went over, and I got downstairs, and there was this huge crowd in the street, between Broadway and West End. So I said, "Gee, I wonder what happened." I got to the Cellar, I walked in, and Peter said, "They're all trying to get in!" That's the way it was, for the entire thing.

According to Val Wilmer, "Dixon had maintained that there was an audience for the new music, at that time still in its infancy, and the nightly turnout that squeezed into the club and spilled out on the sidewalk confirmed this." Total attendance over the four days was roughly seven hundred people. Bernard Gendron wrote:

With advanced advertising in the Village Voice, each of the four nights drew capacity crowds with long lines of people waiting their turn in these marathon events. The audience included a number of jazz musicians, some who came without prompting (Ornette Coleman and Gil Evans), and others who came to participate in the panel discussions (Cecil Taylor, Archie Shepp, and Steve Lacy, among others). Though spearheaded by relatively unknown musicians performing in an out-of-the-way place, the October Revolution created enough of a stir to merit two substantial reviews by DownBeat writers Martin Williams and Dan Morgenstern, in side by side columns...

Writer A. B. Spellman noted: "Almost everybody who's doing anything at all in the way of avant-garde jazz in New York passed through the Cellar during these programs, if not to play, then to participate in the panels or to listen." Roswell Rudd recalled: "I just remember it... [being] very professional. The players were seriously digging in... Serious business... And I don't mean to make it sound like a funeral. It was anything but. What I mean by the word 'focused' is a lot of humor, good feeling, certain amount of good competitiveness. My recollection is very positive." Ekkehard Jost wrote:

With his festival Bill Dixon was able to show, first of all, that there was an enormous pool of musicians in New York who deserved a hearing, and second, that there was a (predominantly young) public which was just as fed up with ossified musical norms – and with the commercial hustle of established jazz clubs too – as were the musicians themselves. The October Revolution did nothing to relieve the financial insecurity of free jazz musicians at first. But it did indicate how musicians could take the initiative into their own hands and secure for themselves what the establishment – content to earn on Brubeck and Peterson – denied them.

== Impact ==
Writer Bill Shoemaker called the October Revolution in Jazz "arguably the most seminal jazz concert series ever held" and stated that it "marked the beginning of the Golden Era of do-it-yourself jazz culture in the U.S." The success of the October Revolution led directly to the formation of the Jazz Composers Guild. Val Wilmer wrote: "Dixon discussed with Cecil Taylor the possibilities of forming an organization that would protect the jazz musician/composer from the exploitation that had hitherto prevailed. 'You can't kill an organisation, but you can kill an individual,' said Dixon..." Dixon also declared that the purpose of the Guild was "to establish the music to its rightful place in society; to awaken the musical conscience of the masses of people to that music which is essential to their lives; to protect musicians and composers from the existing forces of exploitation; to provide an opportunity for the audience to hear the music; to provide facilities for the proper creation, rehearsal, performance, and dissemination of the music." In mid-October, the following announcement appeared:

THE OCTOBER REVOLUTION CONTINUES: musicians-composers Cecil Taylor, Archie Shepp, Sun Ra, Mike Mantler, Burton Greene, Roswell Rudd, John Tchicai, and Bill Dixon have united as the JAZZ COMPOSERS GUILD with the idea in mind that the music as represented by the above-named and others must and will no longer remain a part of the "underground" scene.

(These musicians, along with Paul and Carla Bley, would form the core membership of the Jazz Composers Guild.) The following weeks saw a series of Guild-sponsored concerts, featuring the Sun Ra Arkestra, the Roswell Rudd-John Tchicai Quartet (later renamed the New York Art Quartet), the Paul Bley Quintet, the Alan Silva Quartet, the Cecil Taylor Unit, the Bill Dixon Sextette, the Free Form Improvisation Ensemble, and the Archie Shepp Septette, at the Cellar Café and several other locations. One of these concerts, called the "Pre-Halloween Jazz Party," ran from 9:00 p.m. – 6:00 a.m. on October 30–31 and was put on "to raise funds to provide a permanent home for the Guild." These concerts were followed by the Guild's most visible event, a four-day series called "Four Days in December", running from December 28–31 at Judson Hall. Participants were the Cecil Taylor Unit, the Bill Dixon Sextette, the Paul Bley Quintet, the Jazz Composer's Guild Orchestra, the Free Form Improvisation Ensemble, the Archie Shepp Quartet, the Roswell Rudd-John Tchicai Quartet, and the Sun Ra Arkestra. According to Ingrid Monson, "The first night pulled a standing-room-only crowd of 300, while the remaining nights drew about 150 each. In any case, the success of these two concert series served as a basis for optimism about the possibilities of alternative means of organizing musical events."

The Guild soon abandoned the Cellar Café when the owner of the building more than doubled the rent. The Café was also issued a summons for presenting music without a proper license, and closed its doors. The Guild itself proved to be short-lived, but did "light the way for the organisations that were to follow," such as the Jazz and People's Movement, the Collective Black Artists group, and the AACM.

== Tributes ==
In 1994, in celebration of the thirtieth anniversary of the October Revolution in Jazz, Rashied Ali (who had participated in the 1964 concerts), Borah Bergman, Joe McPhee, Wilber Morris, and the Myra Melford Trio recorded an album titled The October Revolution, released on the Evidence label.
