= New York Art Quartet =

The New York Art Quartet was a free jazz ensemble, originally made up of saxophonist John Tchicai, trombonist Roswell Rudd, drummer Milford Graves and bassist Lewis Worrell, that came into existence in 1964 in New York City. Worrell was later replaced by various other bassists, including Reggie Workman, Finn Von Eyben, Harold Dodson, Eddie Gómez, Steve Swallow, and Buell Neidlinger. All About Jazz reviewer Clifford Allen wrote that the group "cut some of the most powerful music in the free jazz underground".

In November 1962, Tchicai moved from his home country of Denmark to New York City at the suggestion of Archie Shepp and Bill Dixon, whom he had met at the Helsinki Jazz Festival earlier that year. Upon arriving in New York, Tchicai began playing with Dixon's group, which included Shepp and Roswell Rudd among others, and also sat in with Don Cherry and various other musicians. By the summer of 1963, Tchicai, Shepp, and Cherry had formed the New York Contemporary Five with bassist Don Moore and drummer J. C. Moses, while Rudd, with Shepp, continued to play with Dixon. According to Rudd, the idea of forming a new quartet originated with Tchicai, and the two began playing in filmmaker Michael Snow's loft space with Moore and Moses. Moses soon left as a result of mutual dissatisfaction with his role, and Rudd and Tchicai were soon introduced to drummer Milford Graves by saxophonist Giuseppi Logan. Tchicai recalled: "this was a very pleasant surprise and more than that, because Graves simply baffled both Rudd and I in that we, at that time, hadn't heard anybody of the younger musicians in New York that had the same sense of rhythmic cohesion in poly-rhythmics or the same sense of intensity and musicality." Graves "wound up playing with them for half an hour, astonishing Rudd and Tchicai, who promptly invited him to join what became The New York Art Quartet". Graves later stated that his invitation to join the group came "at a time when the evolutive phases of my spiritual and creative potential were in need of being expressed without limitation". However, Tchicai also recalled that "bassist Don Moore became so frightened of this wizard of a percussionist that he decided that this couldn't be true or possible and, therefore, refused to play with us", and the group brought in bassist Lewis Worrell in his place.

In July 1964, Tchicai and Rudd briefly joined Albert Ayler's quartet, which consisted of Ayler, Cherry, Gary Peacock, and Sunny Murray, to record New York Eye and Ear Control, the soundtrack for a film by Michael Snow. That fall, the NYAQ, calling themselves "The John Tchicai Quartet", played their debut concert, participating in the "October Revolution in Jazz" organized by Bill Dixon. In November, the NYAQ recorded their first album as part of ESP Disk's original roster of jazz artists, and a month later they performed at the Dixon-organized festival "Four Days in December" as the "Roswell Rudd - John Tchicai Quartet", playing opposite Sun Ra at Judson Hall. The group's second album, Mohawk, was recorded in July 1965 with Reggie Workman on bass (Worrell left the group in December 1964), and was released on the Fontana label. In the fall of 1965, Tchicai lined up dates for the NYAQ in Copenhagen, Gothenburg (Sweden), Hilversum (Holland), and Amsterdam (where they opened for Ornette Coleman's group), with Finn Von Eyben playing bass and Louis Moholo playing drums as a result of scheduling issues with the original musicians. Recordings from this tour were issued on Roswell Rudd, released in 1971 without Rudd's consent, and in 2010 on the album Old Stuff. The group broke up in February 1966, with Tchicai returning to Denmark.

On June 13, 1999, the NYAQ, with Workman on bass, reunited for a performance at the Bell Atlantic Jazz Festival, opening for Sonic Youth. Amiri Baraka, whose poem "Black Dada Nihilismus" was included on their debut album 35 years earlier, also appeared. The group recorded the album 35th Reunion the following day. In 2000 they played the Paris Banlieues Blues Festival, followed by a performance at the Lisboa festival in 2001. In 2013, after Tchicai's death, Triple Point Records released a limited-edition five-LP box set, along with a 156-page coffee-table book and miscellaneous artifacts, entitled Call It Art.

According to Tchicai, one of the most unique aspects of the NYAQ was "the polyphonic part of the music that came into play; the whole collective style of playing that also existed in New Orleans Jazz and classical music. The polyphonic aspect of our music was something quite new compared to what other people were doing in contemporary jazz." David Toop described the group's signature sound as "deliberately ragged, bleary themes tumbling out in spasms, notes tailing away as if lost to daydream, the music so open that total collapse seems perpetually imminent". In his liner notes to Mohawk, Tchicai wrote: "The important thing about our music is that it must be heard and listened to without preconceived ideas as to how jazz should sound – listen to it as MUSIC and let that be the only label!"

A documentary on the NYAQ, entitled The Breath Courses Through Us, was released in 2013 by director Alan Roth.

== Discography ==
- 1965: New York Art Quartet (ESP-Disk)
- 1965: Mohawk (Fontana Records)
- 2000: 35th Reunion (DIW Records)
- 2010: Old Stuff (Cuneiform)
- 2013: Call It Art (Triple Point): contains five LPs (four hours) of previously unreleased material and a 150-plus-page coffee-table book
