= Live in Stockholm 1961 =

Live album by John Coltrane
- Recorded: November 23, 1961
- Venue: Koncerthusen, Stockholm, Sweden
- Label: LeJazz

Live in Stockholm 1961 is an album by featuring live performances by jazz musician John Coltrane recorded in November 1961 at the Koncerthusen, Stockholm.

== Reception ==
Professional ratings
Review scores
Source	Rating
AllMusic	4.5/5 stars

AllMusic awarded the album 4½ stars.

== Track listing ==
1. "My Favorite Things" – 20:48
2. "Blue Train" – 8:54
3. "Naima" – 4:00
4. "Impressions" – 7:11

== Personnel ==
- John Coltrane – tenor saxophone/soprano saxophone
- Eric Dolphy – flute/alto saxophone
- McCoy Tyner – piano
- Reggie Workman – double bass
- Elvin Jones – drums
