= Archie Shepp Live in San Francisco =

Live album by Archie Shepp
- Released: October 1966
- Recorded: February 19, 1966
- Genre: Jazz
- Length: 33:53 (LP); 74:43 (CD)
- Label: Impulse!
- Producer: Bob Thiele

Archie Shepp chronology
New Thing at Newport (1965)	Archie Shepp Live in San Francisco (1966)	Mama Too Tight (1966)

Three for a Quarter, One for a Dime Cover

Professional ratings
Review scores
Source	Rating
AllMusic	4/5 stars
DownBeat	3.5/5 stars

Archie Shepp Live in San Francisco is a live album by Archie Shepp released on Impulse! Records in 1966. The album contains a performance recorded by Shepp, trombonist Roswell Rudd, bassists Donald Garrett and Lewis Worrell and drummer Beaver Harris at the now defunct Both/And Club in San Francisco, CA, on February 19, 1966. The CD edition also contains an extended track that was released on LP as Three for a Quarter, One for a Dime in 1969.

== Reception ==
The AllMusic review by Scott Yanow states that "This Impulse recording features the fiery tenor Archie Shepp with his regularly working group of the period, a quintet also featuring trombonist Roswell Rudd, drummer Beaver Harris and both Donald Garrett and Lewis Worrell on basses. Although two pieces (Shepp's workout on piano on the ballad 'Sylvia' and his recitation on 'The Wedding') are departures, the quintet sounds particularly strong on Herbie Nichols' 'The Lady Sings the Blues' and 'Wherever June Bugs Go' while Shepp's ballad statement on 'In a Sentimental Mood' is both reverential and eccentric".

== Track listing ==
1. "Keep Your Heart Right" (Roswell Rudd) – 1:15
2. "Lady Sings the Blues" (Herbie Nichols) – 7:32
3. "Sylvia" (Oley Speaks) – 5:35
4. "The Wedding" – 2:52
5. "Wherever June Bugs Go" – 10:25
6. "In a Sentimental Mood" (Duke Ellington, Manny Kurtz, Irving Mills) – 6:14
7. "Things Ain't What They Used to Be" (Mercer Ellington, Ted Persons) – 7:56 Bonus track on CD
8. "Three for a Quarter, One for a Dime" – 32:54 Bonus track on CD

All compositions by Archie Shepp except as indicated
- Recorded at the Both/And Club in San Francisco, CA, on February 19, 1966

== Personnel ==
- Archie Shepp – tenor saxophone, piano, recitation
- Roswell Rudd – trombone
- Donald Garrett – bass
- Lewis Worrell – bass
- Beaver Harris – drums
