= Roswell Rudd (album) =

Live album by Roswell Rudd
- Released: 1971
- Recorded: November 1965
- Studio: Hilversum, Netherlands
- Genre: Jazz
- Label: America Records; 30 AM 6114

Roswell Rudd chronology
Everywhere (1967)	Roswell Rudd (1971)	Numatik Swing Band (1973)

Roswell Rudd is a live album by the trombonist Roswell Rudd, the first recording under his name. It was recorded in November 1965 in Hilversum, Netherlands, and was released by America Records in 1971. On the album, Rudd is joined by saxophonist John Tchicai, bassist Finn Von Eyben, and drummer Louis Moholo.

In the fall of 1965, Tchicai lined up dates for the New York Art Quartet, a group that he co-led with Rudd, in Copenhagen, Gothenburg (Sweden), Hilversum (Holland), and Amsterdam (where they opened for Ornette Coleman's group), with Von Eyben and Moholo substituting for band members Reggie Workman and Milford Graves, who were unable to make the trip. The NYAQ album Old Stuff, featuring these four players, was recorded in Copenhagen in October, while the album Roswell Rudd was recorded for a radio broadcast while the group was in Hilversum in November. (The date listed on the album jacket, February 1965, is incorrect.) The French label America Records released the album in 1971 without Rudd's consent.

== Reception ==
Professional ratings
Review scores
Source	Rating
AllMusic	3.5/5 stars
The Penguin Guide to Jazz	3/4 stars
Tom Hull – on the Web	B+

In a review for AllMusic, Matt Collar wrote: "Fans of Rudd will immediately recognize his peculiar slide-heavy and note-bending style. While the album is primarily a free jazz effort, tracks such as 'Old Stuff' and 'Respects' do belie a quasi-boppish influence not dissimilar to the work of avant-garde icon saxophonist Ornette Coleman."

The authors of the Penguin Guide to Jazz Recordings called the album "a tight, intensely swinging record, best heard as bop with freeish elements," and described Moholo's drumming as "a revelation."

A writer for All About Jazz commented: "Rudd embellishes free expressions with an unflappable empathy.... 'Sweet Smells'... is introspective in its opening repeated bass and horn lines, though a real thrust and underlying swing carry the tune... bassist Finn Von Eyben and... drummer Louis Moholo allow the horns to play anything at any given juncture, without a single gratuitous moment... Moholo's loping beats, unique timing, and Elvin Jones-influenced polyrhythms push both horns with a subtlety of slowing then speeding up the meter, which takes 'Sweet Smells' out in an unaccompanied break that will make you want to replay its last thirty seconds. Closing the session is Monk's ever-familiar 'Pannonica', a densely packed three minutes by the group which proves that their spontaneous creations run parallel to a compositional grounding."

Francis Davis of The Village Voice stated that the album's mediocre sound quality is "not bad enough to muffle the Rudd-and-John Tchicai polyphony that was the group's mark of distinction—and one of the greatest joys of '60s free."

Clifford Allen of Paris Transatlantic remarked: "Rudd's gritty freedom and bawdy humor are matched perfectly by the dry, acerbic surrealism of Tchicai's solos, which look back to Steve Lacy and forward to the less-bluesy Anthony Braxton recitals." He praised Moholo's "subtly complex drumming," calling it "in many ways the focus of this recording," and "the expansion and contraction of breathing, a constancy that supports Rudd and Tchicai's flights."

== Track listing ==
1. "Respects" (Rudd) – 10:30
2. "Old Stuff" (Rudd) – 8:55
3. "Jabulani" (Tchicai) – 4:57
4. "Sweet Smells" (Rudd) – 10:17
5. "Pannonica" (Thelonious Monk) – 3:08

== Personnel ==
- Roswell Rudd – trombone
- John Tchicai – alto saxophone
- Finn Von Eyben – bass
- Louis Moholo – drums
