= Mohawk (album) =

Studio album by New York Art Quartet
- Released: 1965
- Recorded: July 16, 1965
- Studio: Van Gelder Studio, Englewood Cliffs, New Jersey
- Genre: Free jazz
- Label: Fontana Records

New York Art Quartet chronology
New York Art Quartet (1965)	Mohawk (1965)	35th Reunion (2000)

Mohawk is the second album by the New York Art Quartet. It was recorded by Rudy Van Gelder on July 16, 1965, and was released later that year by Fontana Records. It features John Tchicai on alto saxophone, Roswell Rudd on trombone, Reggie Workman on bass, and Milford Graves on percussion.

In the album liner notes, Tchicai wrote: "The important thing about our music is that it must be heard and listened to without preconceived ideas as to how jazz should sound – listen to it as MUSIC and let that be the only label!"

== Reception ==
Professional ratings
Review scores
Source	Rating
AllMusic	4/5 stars
DownBeat	4.5/5 stars

John Corbett wrote: "it's the remarkable drumming of Milford Graves that makes this record more than another nice entry in the 'New Thing' discography. Indeed, this lp is a major event, perhaps the best evidence of what a totally new rhythmic concept Graves had invented, and the top recording of unpulsed drumming, bar none... his playing is as shocking and revelatory as Tony Williams on Eric Dolphy's Out to Lunch, and perhaps more so... Graves proves that it's possible to imply forward motion and at the same time resist the simple groove. His metrical overlays and wavelike fluidity are as astonishing now as they must have been then, in part because so few players have had the discipline to pick up on and develop them. Here's an example of free jazz that's ceaselessly creative and puts something new on the table."

David Toop described the group's sound on the album as "deliberately ragged, bleary themes tumbling out in spasms, notes tailing away as if lost to daydream, the music so open that total collapse seems perpetually imminent... quite unlike the music of their peers."

== Track listing ==
1. "Rufus 3rd" (Tchicai) - 6:35
2. "Mohawk" (Charlie Parker) - 4:40
3. "Banging On The White House Door" (Rudd) - 9:10
4. "No. 6" (Tchicai) - 6:15
5. "Everything Happens to Me" (Dennis, Adair) - 6:35
6. "Quintus T." (Tchicai) - 2:45
7. "Sweet V." (Rudd) - 3:35

Recorded on July 16, 1965.

== Personnel ==
- John Tchicai – alto saxophone
- Roswell Rudd – trombone
- Reggie Workman – bass
- Milford Graves – percussion
