= John Tchicai =

Danish jazz saxophonist and composer (1936–2012)

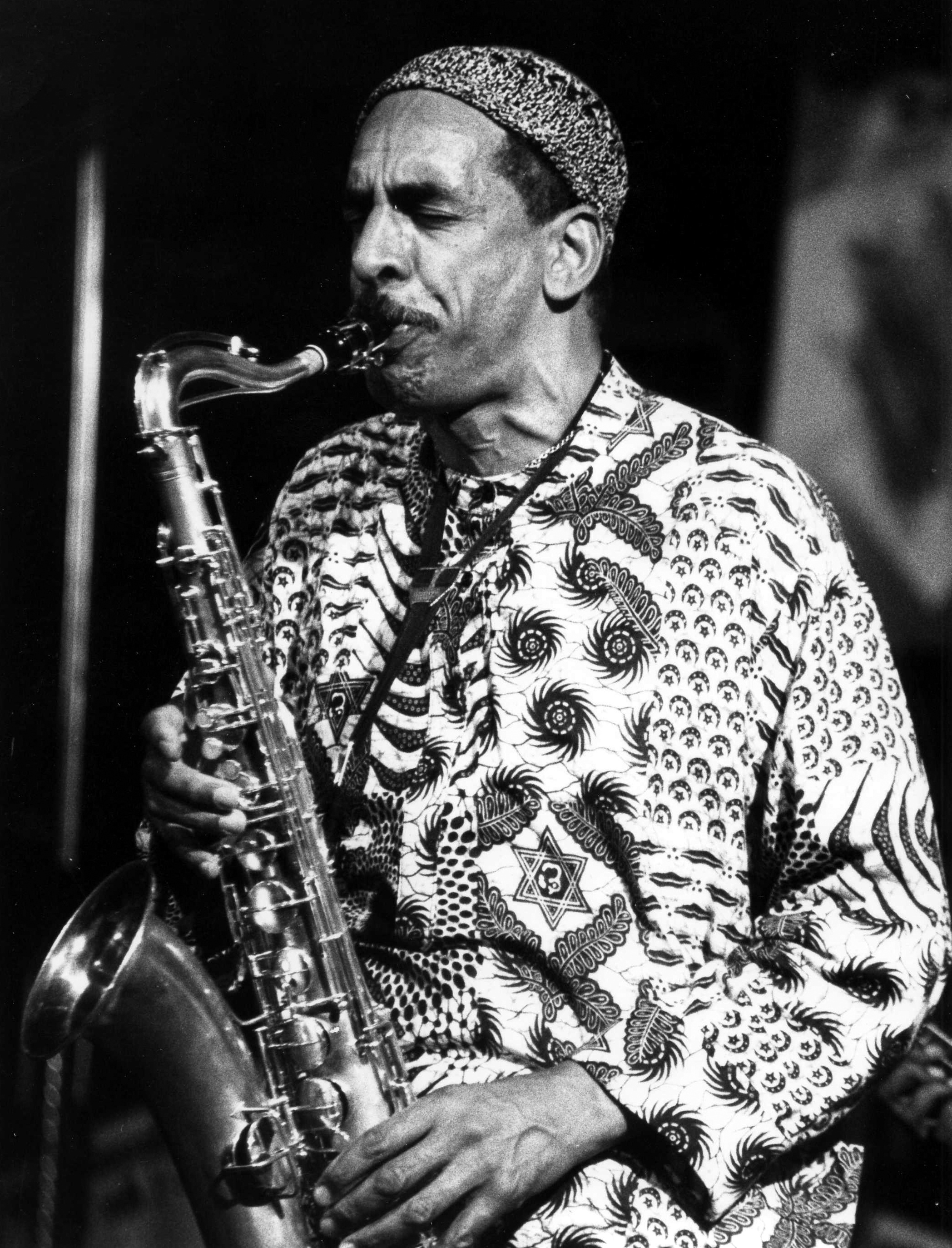
- Tchicai at Münster Jazz Festival, 1987)

Background information
- Born: John Martin Tchicai; 28 April 1936; Copenhagen, Denmark
- Died: 8 October 2012 (aged 76) Perpignan, France
- Genres: Free jazz
- Occupations: Musician, composer
- Instrument: Saxophone
- Years active: 1962–2012

John Martin Tchicai (/tʃɪˈkaɪ/ chih-KYE; 28 April 1936 – 8 October 2012) was a Danish free jazz saxophonist and composer.

== Biography ==
Tchicai was born in Copenhagen, Denmark, to a Danish mother and a Congolese father. The family moved to Aarhus, where he studied violin when young, and in his mid-teens began playing clarinet and alto saxophone, focusing on the latter. By the late 1950s, he was travelling around northern Europe, playing with many musicians.

In 1962, he met trumpeter Bill Dixon and saxophonist Archie Shepp at a festival in Helsinki, Finland. At their suggestion, he moved to New York City the following year, and went on to participate in the October Revolution in Jazz and join the New York Contemporary Five and the New York Art Quartet. He also played on a number of influential free jazz recordings, including Shepp's Four for Trane, Albert Ayler's New York Eye and Ear Control, John Coltrane's Ascension, and the Jazz Composer's Orchestra's Communication.

Following his work in New York, Tchicai returned to Denmark in 1966, and shortly thereafter focused most of his time on music education. He formed the small orchestra Cadentia Nova Danica with Danish and other European musicians; this group collaborated with Musica Elettronica Viva and performed in multi-media events. Tchicai was a founding member of Amsterdam's Instant Composers Pool in 1968, and in 1969 took part in the recording of John Lennon and Yoko Ono's Unfinished Music No.2: Life with the Lions.

On 30 August 1975 Tchicai's appearance at the Willisau Jazz Festival was recorded and released later that year as Willi the Pig. On this record, he plays with Swiss pianist Irène Schweizer. Tchicai returned to a regular gigging and recording schedule in the late 1970s. In the early 1980s, he switched to the tenor saxophone as his primary instrument. In 1990, he was awarded a lifetime grant from the Danish Ministry of Culture.

Tchicai and his wife relocated to Davis, California, in 1991, where he led several ensembles. He was awarded a National Endowment for the Arts fellowship in 1997. He was a member of Henry Kaiser and Wadada Leo Smith's "Yo Miles" band, a loose aggregation of musicians exploring Miles Davis's electric period.

Since 2001, he had been living near Perpignan in southern France. On 11 June 2012, he suffered a brain hemorrhage in an airport in Barcelona, Spain. He was recovering and had canceled all appearances when he died in a Perpignan hospital on 8 October 2012, aged 76.

2021 saw the publication of a biography titled A Chaos with Some Kind of Order, written by Margriet Naber, Tchicai's former wife and collaborator for 20 years, and published by Ear Heart Mind Media. Writer Richard Williams called the book an "intimate and valuable account of (Tchicai's) life and work".

== Discography ==
=== As leader / co-leader ===
- 1968: Cadentia Nova Danica (Polydor) with Karsten Vogel, Hugh Steinmetz, Kim Menzer, Max Brüel, Steffen Andersen, Giorgio Musoni, Yvan Krill, Robidoo
- 1969: Afrodisiaca (MPS) with Cadentia Nova Danica
- 1975: Willi the Pig (Willisau) with Irène Schweizer, Buschi Niebergall, Makaya Ntshoko
- 1977: Darktown Highlights (Storyville) with Simon Spang-Hanssen, Peter Danstrup, Ole Roemer
- 1977: Real Tchicai (SteepleChase) with Pierre Dørge, Niels-Henning Ørsted Pedersen
- 1977: Solo (FMP) with Albert Mangelsdorff
- 1978: Barefoot Dance (Marge) with André Goudbeek
- 1978: Duets (SVM) with André Goudbeek
- 1978: John Tchicai & Strange Brothers (FMP) with Peter Danstrup, Ole Rømer, Simon Spang-Hansen
- 1980: Live In Athens (Praxis) (solo concert)
- 1981: Continent (Praxis) with Hartmut Geerken
- 1983: Merlin Vibrations (Plainisphare) with the John Tchicai Orchestra
- 1985: Cassava Balls (Praxis) with Hartmut Geerken, Don Moye
- 1987: The African Tapes Volume 1 (Praxis) with Hartmut Geerken, Don Moye
- 1987: Timo's Message (Black Saint) with Christian Kuntner, Thomas Dürst, Timo Fleig
- 1987: Put Up The Fight (Storyville)
- 1988: The African Tapes Volume 2 (Praxis) with Hartmut Geerken, Don Moye
- 1988: Tchicai / Clinch (Olufsen Records) with Clinch (Christer Irgens-Møller, Peter Friis-Nielsen, Pierre Oliver Jürgens)
- 1992: Satisfaction (Enja) with Vitold Rek
- 1993: Grandpa's Spells (Storyville) with Misha Mengelberg
- 1995: Love Is Touching (B&W) with the Archetypes
- 1998: Love Notes From The Madhouse (8th Harmonic Breakdown) with Yusef Komunyakaa
- 1999: Life Overflowing (Nada) with Charlie Kohlhase
- 2000: John Tchicai's Infinitesimal Flash (Buzz Records) with Francis Wong, Adam Lane, Mat Marucci
- 2001: Anybody Home? (Tutl)
- 2001: 2 X 2 (Taso) with Vitold Rek and Karl Berger
- 2002: On Top of Your Head (Ninth World)
- 2003: Hope Is Bright Green Up North (CIMP) with Pierre Dørge and Lou Grassi
- 2003: Dos (CIMP) with Adam Lane
- 2005: John Tchicai With Strings (Treader)
- 2005: Big Chief Dreaming (Soul Note) with Garrison Fewell, Massimo Manzi, Tino Tracanna, Paolino Dalla Porta
- 2005: Hymne til Sofia – Hymn to Sophia (Calibrated) with Kristian Høeg, Ib Bindel, Frederik Magle, Peter Ole Jørgensen, and others
- 2006: Witch's Scream (TUM) with Andrew Cyrille and Reggie Workman
- 2006: Good Night Songs (Boxholder) with Charlie Kohlhase and Garrison Fewell
- 2007: Boiler (Ninth World Music) with Thomas Agergaard, Peter Ole Jørgensen, Sirone
- 2008: Coltrane In Spring (ILK Music) with Jonas Müller, Nikolas Munch-Hansen, and Kresten Osgood
- 2008: No Trespassing (Azzurra) with Ice9
- 2008: One Long Minute (NuBop) with John Tchicai's Five Points
- 2008: Schlachtfest Session II (Klangbad)
- 2009: Treader Duos (Treader) with Tony Marsh (one track)
- 2009: In Monk's Mood (SteepleChase) with George Colligan, Steve LaSpina, Billy Drummond
- 2009: Look To The Neutrino (Zerozerojazz) with the Lunar Quartet
- 2010: Truth Lies In-Between (Hôte Marge)
- 2012: West Africa Tour (Sierra Leone, Liberia & Guinea), April 1985 (Sagittarius A-Star)
- 2013: Tribal Ghost (NoBusiness) with Charlie Kohlhase, Garrison Fewell, Cecil McBee, and Billy Hart
- 2015: Clapham Duos (Treader) with Evan Parker
- 2015: 27 September 2010 (Otoroku) with Tony Marsh and John Edwards
- 2017: Du Maurier, Vancouver Jazz Festival, 1988 (Condition West) with Vinny Golia, Bill Smith, Clyde Reed, Gregg Simpson
- 2020: Live at the Stone (Minus Zero)

=== As sideman ===
With Albert Ayler

- New York Eye and Ear Control (1964, ESP-Disk)

With the Berlin Jazz Workshop Orchestra

- Who Is Who? (1979, FMP)

With the Binder Quintet

- Binder Quintet Featuring John Tchicai (1983, Krém)

With Willem Breuker and Johan van der Keuken

- Music For His Films 1967 / 1994 (1997, BV Haast)

With Brotherhood of Breath

- Yes Please (1981, In and Out)

With the Brus Trio

- Soaked Sorrows (1988, Dragon)

With Burnin' Red Ivanhoe

- M 144 (1969, Sonet)

With Curtis Clark

- Letter to South Africa (1987, Nimbus) with Ernst Reijseger, Ernst Glerum, Louis Moholo

With John Coltrane

- Ascension (1965, Impulse!)

With Peter Danstrup

- Reptiles in the Sky (2010, Gateway)
- Beautiful Untrue Things (2012, Gateway)

With Dell – Westergaard – Lillinger

- Dell – Westegaard – Lillinger feat. John Tchicai (2012, Jazzwerkstatt)

With Pierre Dørge

- Ballad Round the Left Corner (1980, Steeplechase) with Niels-Henning Ørsted Pedersen, Billy Hart
- Ball At Louisiana (1983, Steeplechase)
- Brikama (1984, Steeplechase) with New Jungle Orchestra
- Very Hot, Even The Moon Is Dancing (1985, Steeplechase) with New Jungle Orchestra
- Johnny Lives (1987, Steeplechase) with New Jungle Orchestra
- Different Places - Different Bananas (1989, Olufsen) with New Jungle Orchestra
- Peer Gynt (1989, Olufsen) with New Jungle Orchestra
- Live In Chicago (1991, Olufsen) with New Jungle Orchestra
- Giraf (1998, Dacapo Records) with New Jungle Orchestra

With Johnny Dyani

- Witchdoctor's Son (1978, SteepleChase) with Dudu Pukwana
- Angolian Cry (1985, SteepleChase)

With John Ehlis

- John Ehlis Ensemble (1996, Sivac)
- Along the Way (2012, Sivac)

With The Engines

- Other Violets (2013, Not Two)

With Garrison Fewell's Variable Density Sound Orchestra

- Evolving Strategies (2012, Not Two)

With Charles Gayle

- Always Born (1988, Silkheart)

With George Gruntz

- Monster Sticksland Meeting Two – Monster Jazz (1974, MPS / BASF)

With Paul Hemmings

- Letter From America (2007, Leading Tone Records)

With The Instant Composers Pool

- Instant Composers Pool with Misha Mengelberg and Han Bennink (1968, ICP)
- Fragments with Misha Mengelberg, Han Bennink, and Derek Bailey (1978, ICP)
- Tetterettet (1977, ICP)

With The Jazz Composer's Orchestra

- Communication (1965, Fontana)

With Henry Kaiser and Wadada Leo Smith

- Yo Miles! Sky Garden (2003, Cuneiform Records)
- Yo Miles! Upriver (2013, Cuneiform Records)

With Adam Lane

- Fo(u)r Being(s) (2002, CIMP)

With John Lennon and Yoko Ono

- Unfinished Music No. 2: Life with the Lions (1969, Zapple)

With Jorgen Leth

- Jazz Jamboree 1962 Vol.4 (2013, Jazzhus Disk) (Leth's name is on the album although he is not a musician and does not play on it.)

With New York Art Quartet

- New York Art Quartet (1964 [1965], ESP-Disk)
- Mohawk (1965, Fontana)
- Roswell Rudd (1965 [1971], America)
- 35th Reunion (1999 [2000], DIW Records)
- Old Stuff (1965 [2010], Cuneiform)
- Call It Art (1964–1965 [2013], Triple Point)

With New York Contemporary Five

- Consequences (1963, Fontana)
- Rufus (1963, Fontana)
- New York Contemporary Five Vol. 1 (1963, Sonet)
- New York Contemporary Five Vol. 2 (1963, Sonet)
- Bill Dixon 7-tette/Archie Shepp and the New York Contemporary Five (1964, Savoy). One side of LP

With Giancarlo Nicolai

- Giancarlo Nicolai Trio & John Tchicai (1987, Leo Records)

With the Open Orchestra

- The Spiritual Man (2009, Terre Sommerse)

With Francisco Mondragon Rio

- Ancient Civilizations (1997, Pulque) with Karl Berger

With Rent Romus

- Adapt... or DIE! (1997, Jazzheads) with Lords of Outland

With Archie Shepp

- Four for Trane (1964, Impulse!)

With Katrine Suwalski and Another World

- Message of Love (2013, Gateway)

With Cecil Taylor

- Winged Serpent (Sliding Quadrants) (1985, Soul Note)

With Triot

- Sudden Happiness (2004, TUM)

With Wiebelfetzer

- Live (1971, Bazillus)

With Yggdrasil

- Den Yderste Ø (1981, Tutl)
- Yggdrasil (2002, Tutl)
- Concerto Grotto (1984, Tutl)
- Askur (2007, Tutl)

With De Zes Winden (The Six Winds)

- Live At The Bim And More (1986, BV Haast)
- Elephants Can Dance (1988, Sackville)
- Man Met Muts (1990, BV Haast)
- Anger Dance (1993, BV Haast)
- Manestraal (1997, BV Haast)

With Either/Orchestra

- Across the Omniverse (1996, Accurate Records)

== Filmography ==
- Looking For Ornette (La Huit / Mezzo, 2016)

== Gallery ==
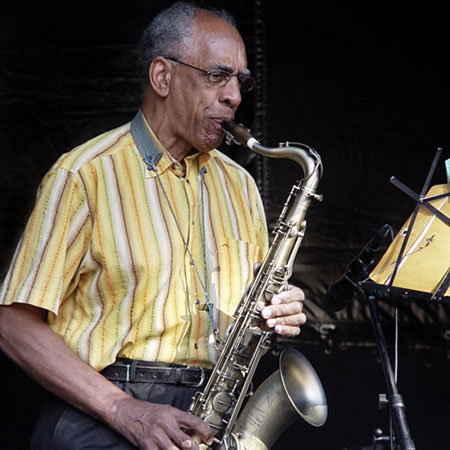

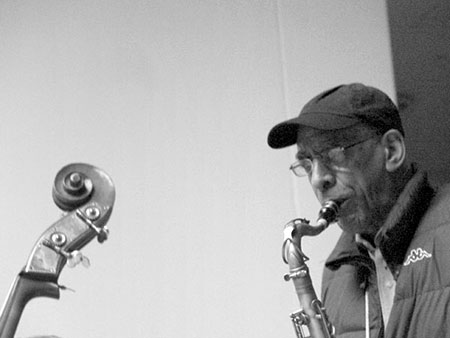

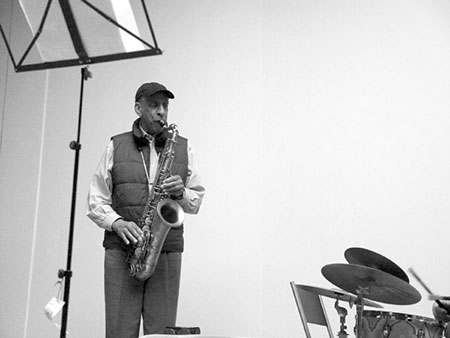

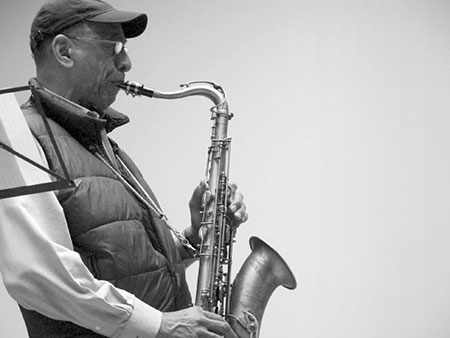

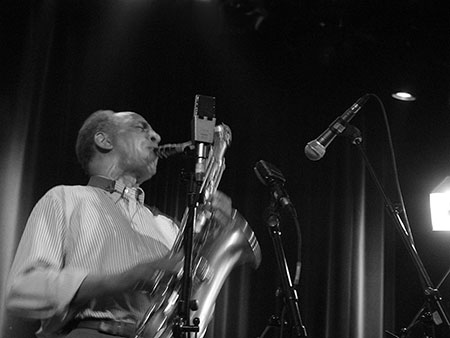

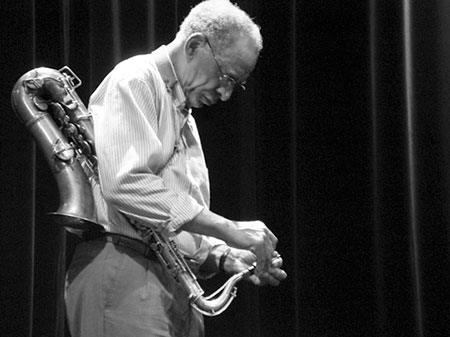
