= Jazz Composer's Orchestra =

American jazz group

The Jazz Composer's Orchestra was an American jazz group, founded by Carla Bley and Michael Mantler in 1965, to perform orchestral avant-garde jazz.

Its origins lay in the Jazz Composers Guild, an organization founded by Bill Dixon which grew out of the series of 1964 concerts in New York, known as the "October Revolution in Jazz" and subsequent regular performance settings. A big band, formed by Bley and Mantler, became known as the Jazz Composers Guild Orchestra, which made its first record in April 1965. After the demise of the Guild, the big band continued as the Jazz Composer's Orchestra. A non-profit organisation was established in 1966, the Jazz Composers Orchestra Association Inc. (JCOA).

The Orchestra's first release was Communication in 1965. Their 1968 double-album The Jazz Composer's Orchestra featured soloists Cecil Taylor, Don Cherry, Roswell Rudd, Pharoah Sanders, Larry Coryell, and Gato Barbieri.

JCOA Records was founded for releases from the Orchestra and its members.

The albums included commissioned works by Roswell Rudd, Clifford Thornton, Don Cherry, Leroy Jenkins and Grachan Moncur III. The group's last performance was in 1975. The activities of the group led to the creation of a record distribution company known as New Music Distribution Service (NMDS).

== Discography ==
- Communication (Fontana, 1965)
- The Jazz Composer's Orchestra (JCOA, 1968)
- Escalator over the Hill with Carla Bley (JCOA, 1971)
- Relativity Suite with Don Cherry (JCOA, 1973)
- Numatik Swing Band with Roswell Rudd (JCOA, 1973)
- The Gardens of Harlem with Clifford Thornton (JCOA, 1975)
- Echoes of Prayer with Grachan Moncur III (JCOA, 1975)
- For Players Only with Leroy Jenkins (JCOA, 1975)
