= Roswell Rudd =

American jazz trombonist and composer (1935–2017)

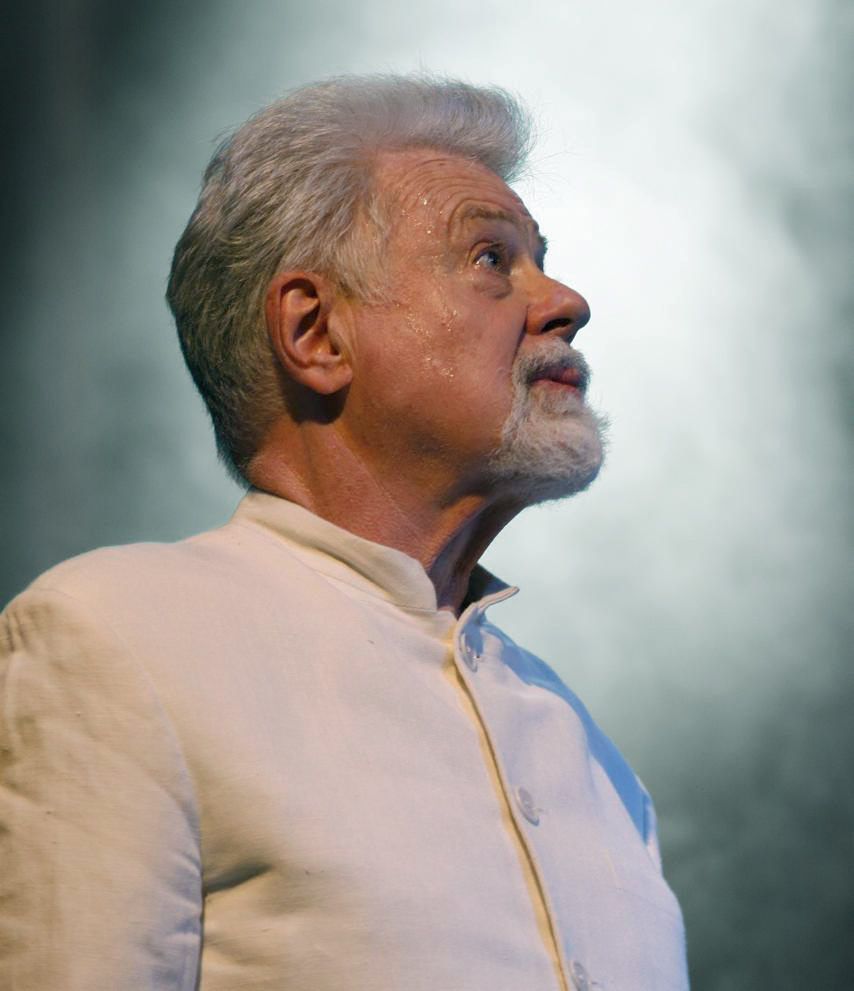
- Rudd in 2006

Background information
- Born: Roswell Hopkins Rudd Jr. 17 November 1935; Sharon, Connecticut, U.S.
- Died: 21 December 2017 (aged 82) Kerhonkson, New York, U.S.
- Genres: Avant-garde jazz, free jazz
- Occupations: Musician, composer, educator
- Instrument: Trombone
- Years active: 1957–2017
- Labels: Columbia, Sunnyside, Universal, DIW, Verve
- Website: www.roswellrudd.com

Roswell Hopkins Rudd Jr. (November 17, 1935 – December 21, 2017) was an American jazz trombonist and composer.

Although skilled in a variety of genres of jazz (including Dixieland, which he performed while in college), and other genres of music, he was known primarily for his work in free and avant-garde jazz. Beginning in 1962 Rudd worked extensively with saxophonist Archie Shepp.

== Biography ==
Rudd was born in Sharon, Connecticut, United States. He attended the Hotchkiss School and graduated from Yale University, where he played with Eli's Chosen Six, a dixieland band of students that Rudd joined in the mid-1950s. The sextet played the boisterous trad jazz style of the day and recorded two albums, including one for Columbia Records. His collaborations with Shepp, Cecil Taylor, John Tchicai, and Steve Lacy grew out of the lessons learned while playing rags and stomps for college audiences in Connecticut. Rudd later taught ethnomusicology at Bard College and the University of Maine.

On and off, for a period of three decades, he assisted Alan Lomax with his world music song style (Cantometrics) and Global Jukebox projects.

In the 1960s, Rudd participated in free jazz recordings such as the New York Art Quartet; the soundtrack for the 1964 film New York Eye and Ear Control; the album Communications by the Jazz Composer's Orchestra; and in collaborations with Don Cherry, Larry Coryell, Pharoah Sanders, and Gato Barbieri. Rudd had lifelong friendships with saxophonists Shepp and Lacy and performed and recorded the music of Thelonious Monk with Lacy.

Rudd and his producer and partner Verna Gillis went to Mali in 2000 and 2001. His album MALIcool (2001) is a cross-cultural collaboration with kora player Toumani Diabaté and other Malian musicians.

In 2004, Rudd brought his Trombone Shout Band to perform at the 4th Festival au Désert in Essakane, Tombouctou Region, Mali. In 2005, he extended his work further, recording an album with the Mongolian Buryat Band, a traditional music group from Mongolia and Buryatia, entitled Blue Mongol. He also conducted master classes and workshops in the United States and internationally.

Rudd died of prostate cancer on December 21, 2017, at home in Kerhonkson, New York. His archives were donated to the Worcester Polytechnic Institute.

== Awards and honors ==
- Nomination: Grammy Award for Best Vocal Performance Male and Best Jazz Instrumental Album, Monk's Dream (1999)
- Trombonist of the Year, Jazz Journalists Association (2003–05, 2009–10)
- Best Trombonist, Down Beat Critics' Poll (2010)

== Discography ==
=== As leader/co-leader ===
Recording date	Album	Label	Year released	Notes
1965-11	Roswell Rudd	America Records	1971	
1966-07	Everywhere	Impulse!	1967	Also released as part of Mixed
1973-07	Numatik Swing Band	JCOA	1973	Live with the Jazz Composer's Orchestra
1974-03	Flexible Flyer	Freedom	1975	Live
1976-03	Blown Bone	Philips / Emanem	1979	
1976-05	Inside Job	Freedom	1976	Live
1978-07	Sharing	Dischi Della Quercia	1978	With Giorgio Gaslini
1979-03	The Definitive Roswell Rudd	Horo	1979	Rudd plays all instruments
1982-05	Regeneration	Soul Note	1983	With Steve Lacy, Misha Mengelberg, Kent Carter, Han Bennink
1996-11	The Unheard Herbie Nichols, Vol. 1	CIMP	1997	
1996-11	The Unheard Herbie Nichols, Vol. 2	CIMP	1997	
1999-06	Monk's Dream	Verve	2000	
1999-03 – 2000-01	Broad Strokes	Knitting Factory	2000	
2000-01	Eventuality: The Charlie Kohlhase Quintet Plays the Music of Roswell Rudd	Nada	2000	
2000-09	Live in New York	Verve	2001	Live with Archie Shepp
2001-01	Malicool	Sunnyside	2002	With Toumani Diabaté
2002-01– 2004-03	Roswell Rudd & Duck Baker: Live	Dot Time	2021	Live with Duck Baker
2004-08	Airwalkers	Clean Feed	2006	With Mark Dresser
2005-10	Blue Mongol	Sunnyside	2005	
2002-06, 2002-07, 2003-01, 2006-05	El Espíritu Jíbaro	Sunnyside	2007	With Yomo Toro
2008-06	Keep Your Heart Right	Sunnyside	2008	
2008?	El Encuentro	Mojito	2008	With David Oquendo
2009?	Trombone Tribe	Sunnyside	2009	
2011?	The Incredible Honk	Sunnyside	2011	
2013?	Trombone for Lovers	Sunnyside	2013	
2014-07	Strength & Power	RareNoiseRecords	2016	
2016	August Love Song	Red House	2016	With Heather Masse
2017?	Embrace	RareNoiseRecords	2017	

=== As a member ===
Yale University Dixieland Band, Eli's Chosen Six

- College Jazz: Dixieland (Columbia, 1957)
- Ivy League Jazz (Golden Crest, 1957)

The New York Art Quartet

- 1964: New York Art Quartet (ESP-Disk, 1965)
- 1965: Mohawk (Fontana, 1965)
- 1965: Old Stuff (Cuneiform, 2010) – Live
- 1999: 35th Reunion (DIW, 2000)
- box set: Call It Art (Triple Point, 2013)[5LP] – contains four hours of previously unreleased material and a 150-plus-page coffee-table book

=== As sideman ===
With Carla Bley

- Escalator over the Hill (JCOA, 1971)
- Dinner Music (Watt, 1976)
- European Tour 1977 (Watt, 1977)
- Musique Mecanique (Watt, 1979)

With Elton Dean

- Rumors of an Incident (Slam, 1996)
- Newsense (Slam, 1997)

With Archie Shepp

- Four for Trane (Impulse!, 1964)
- Archie Shepp Live in San Francisco (Impulse!, 1966)
- Mama Too Tight (Impulse!, 1967) – rec. 1966
- Life at the Donaueschingen Music Festival (SABA, 1968)

With others

- Buell Neidlinger, Cecil Taylor, New York City R&B (Mosaic, 1961)
- Gil Evans, Into the Hot (Impulse!, 1962)
- Steve Lacy, Dennis Charles, Henry Grimes School Days (Hathut, 1963)
- Robin Kenyatta, Until (Atlantic, 1966)
- Don Cherry, Albert Ayler, John Tchicai and Gary Peacock, New York Eye and Ear Control (ESP-Disk, 1967)
- Michael Mantler, The Jazz Composer's Orchestra (JCOA, 1968)
- Gato Barbieri, The Third World (Flying Dutchman, 1969)
- Charlie Haden, Liberation Music Orchestra (Impulse!, 1971)
- Marcello Melis and Don Moye, Village on the Left (Soul Note, 1974)
- Steve Lacy, Beaver Harris, Kent Carter, Trickles (Soul Note, 1975)
- Hans Dulfer, Arjen Gorter, and Martin van Duynhoven, Maine (Bvhaast, 1976)
- Marcello Melis and Enrico Rava, Don Moye, Gruppo Rubanu, The New Village on the Left (Black Saint, 1977)
- Enrico Rava, J.F. JennyClarke and Aldo Romano, Enrico Rava Quartet (ECM, 1978)
- Sangeeta Michael Berardi, Rashied Ali, Eddie Gomez, Archie Shepp, Divine Song (Sunjump, 1979)
- V.A., Interpretations of Monk (DIW, 1981)
- Hal Willner, That's the Way I Feel Now: A tribute to Thelonious Monk (A&M, 1984)
- Paul Haines, Darn it (American Clave, 1992)
- Allen Lowe, Dark Was the Night (Music & Arts, 1994)
- NRBQ and Terry Adams, Wild Weekend (Virgin, 1995)
- Allen Lowe, Woyzeck's Death (Enja, 1995)
- Keith Tippett et al., Bladik (Cuneiform, 1996)
- NRBQ and Terry Adams, Terrible (New World, 1996)
- Nexus Orchestra, Seize the Time (Splasch, 2002)
- Dime Grind Palace, Sex Mob (Ropeadope, 2003)
- one track with Sonic Youth, The Harry Smith Project (Shout! Factory, 2006)
- Michael Mantler, Concertos (ECM, 2008) – rec. 2007
- The Second Approach Trio, The Light (Solyd, 2009)
