= The Copenhagen Tapes =

Live album with studio recordings by Albert Ayler
- Released: 2002
- Recorded: September 3 and 10, 1964
- Venues: Club Montmartre, Copenhagen, Denmark
- Studios: Danmarks Radio, Copenhagen
- Genre: Free jazz
- Label: Ayler Records

Albert Ayler chronology
New York Eye and Ear Control (1964)	The Copenhagen Tapes (2002)	Ghosts (1964)

The Copenhagen Tapes is an album by American free jazz saxophonist Albert Ayler consisting of six tracks recorded live at the Club Montmartre in Copenhagen, Denmark on September 3, 1964 plus three tracks recorded in a studio by Danish Radio in Copenhagen on September 10 of the same year. The album was released in 2002 by Ayler Records. The live tracks were also included on disc two of the 2004 compilation album Holy Ghost released by Revenant Records, and were also reissued in 2017 on Copenhagen Live 1964, released by hatOLOGY. In 2016, the three studio tracks were included in the album European Radio Studio Recordings 1964 released by hatOLOGY.

== Background ==
In August 1964, the Cafe Montmartre in Copenhagen, where Ayler had previously played with Cecil Taylor, invited Ayler and his trio, which included bassist Gary Peacock and drummer Sunny Murray, to return for an extended engagement. Despite having been offered only a one-way ticket, Ayler accepted the terms with the goal of exposing his music to a wider audience, given the bleak prospects and lack of interest in the United States. (According to Val Wilmer, "Peacock had been without food for fifteen days when Ayler dragged him from his bed to make the trip.") Don Cherry was already in Europe when the trio arrived, and joined them when they arrived. During the tour, which included Holland, Sweden, and Denmark, the group recorded material that would later be released on The Hilversum Session (recorded at a radio studio in Hilversum, The Netherlands on November 9, 1964), Ghosts (later released as Vibrations, recorded September 14 in Copenhagen), and The Copenhagen Tapes, which consists of performances of familiar Ayler tunes such as "Vibrations" and "Spirits".

== Reception ==
Professional ratings
Review scores
Source	Rating
Allmusic	3/5 stars
The Penguin Guide to Jazz	3/4 stars

In a review for AllMusic, François Couture wrote: "The live set is emotionally ferocious, sax and trumpet crying with clamped fists in a way that has rarely been heard," while "the studio set is a different story, sounding warm and clean." He concluded: "The Copenhagen Tapes are not the Holy Grail of the Ayler fan and surely not a good place for newcomers to start... But it makes a highly welcomed addition to the discography of free jazz." Writing for All About Jazz, Derek Taylor called the album "a package destined to be deemed one of the finest releases of the year. Hell, make that the decade."

In a review of the reissue of the six live tracks, Mark Corroto called the recordings "a free jazz aficionado's manna from heaven", and wrote: "Peacock's agility at the bass is equaled by the grace with which he maintains the architecture of the music. While Ayler is blowing down walls (and tradition), Cherry acts as his lieutenant, at times escorting Ayler before pushing him into new directions." He also noted "Murray's ghostly moans and his abandonment of constant pulse for a fragmented sound." In another review of the live recordings, Colin Fleming declared: "It takes all of two bars on the opening 'Spirits'... for the Albert Ayler Quartet to establish technical mastery. Gary Peacock's bass is instantly embroiled in virtuosic cycling patterns, Don Cherry has traced a melody on trumpet, Sunny Murray's drums have woven a path interconnecting the interests of the other players, and Ayler is clearly ready to reach for the planets on tenor." He continued: "Murray and Peacock are a wonder as a rhythm team that provides more in the way of counterpoint and color than rhythm and flow, while you never know what direction Cherry might move in next; the dude is fast, faster, fastest in formulating his ideas. Ayler sometimes has a full-bodied tone reminiscent of a midcentury tenor master like Sonny Rollins, but there's nothing else remotely Rollins-like—or anybody-like—about his playing. That they work in strands of New Orleans funeral music to complement the interstellar stylings makes this a rogue outfit no other jazz band could touch."

Regarding Don Cherry's contribution, Val Wilmer wrote: "The more lyrical extrovert Cherry, with his quick-thinking and open mind, was the ideal partner for Ayler's loosely assembled melodies and darker moods." In a similar vein, John Litweiler wrote: "On the Copenhagen LP Cherry appropriates aspects of Ayler's style – never before or since has he played so many notes so fast – but he is no extension of Ayler. Rather, in the way he commented upon Sonny Rollins, he became a leavening agent in Ayler's music, too. His blasts of punctuation, his joining in ensemble improvisations, his broken phrase responses lend the music the intimacy of sympathetic, recognizable emotion, as opposed to Ayler's extravagance."

Jeff Schwartz, bassist, Ayler biographer, and author of "Free Jazz: A Research and Information Guide", referred to the recordings made during the 1964 European tour as "amongst the greatest jazz ever recorded.". He also wrote: "The addition of Cherry to the group is only one of the many things that makes these performances so outstanding. Peacock plays arco (bowing) at length for the first time on record with Ayler and this enables him to play long tones with vibrato and extract waves of harmonics, both in imitation of Ayler, and to function as a third melodic voice... Murray too plays a greater variety of textures... perhaps aware that he is being decently recorded, for the first time with Ayler... There is a much greater sense of ensemble and textural variety in this group than in prior Ayler aggregations. The quartet conjures the sounds of marching bands and chamber music, as well as those of traditional and avant-garde jazz. Murray introduces vast plains of silence into his playing, leaving one horn alone with the bass, the two horns in duet, or the soloist a cappella. Sometimes also, all four players will improvise together, making the New Orleans collective improvisation that was latent on Spiritual Unity explicit. All of these possibilities would be further explored by Ayler in future, larger, ensembles."

== Track listing ==
All compositions by Albert Ayler.

1. "Spirits" - 9:40
2. "Vibrations" - 8:14
3. "Saints" - 9:09
4. "Mothers" - 7:53
5. "Children" - 8:39
6. "Spirits" - 1:24
7. "Introductions by Albert Ayler and Børje Roger Hensen" - 3:24
8. "Vibrations" - 7:42
9. "Saints" - 7:09
10. "Spirits" - 4:55

== Personnel ==
- Albert Ayler - tenor saxophone
- Don Cherry - cornet
- Gary Peacock - bass
- Sunny Murray - drums
