= Mixed (album) =

Compilation album by Cecil Taylor/Roswell Rudd
- Released: 1998
- Recorded: October 10, 1961 & July 8, 1966
- Genre: Jazz
- Length: 69:56
- Label: Impulse!
- Producer: Creed Taylor

Cecil Taylor chronology
New York City R&B (1961)	Mixed (1998)	Nefertiti, the Beautiful One Has Come (1962)

Roswell Rudd chronology
Roswell Rudd (1965)	Everywhere (1966)	Numatik Swing Band (1973)

Mixed is a compilation album of two avant-garde jazz sessions featuring performances by the Cecil Taylor Unit and the Roswell Rudd Sextet. The album was released on the Impulse! label in 1998 and collects three performances by Taylor with Archie Shepp, Jimmy Lyons, Henry Grimes and Sunny Murray with Ted Curson and Roswell Rudd added on one track which were originally released under Gil Evans' name on Into the Hot (1961). The remaining tracks feature Rudd with Giuseppi Logan, Lewis Worrell, Charlie Haden, Beaver Harris and Robin Kenyatta and were originally released as Everywhere (1966). Essentially these are the three Cecil Taylor tracks from the "Gil Evans album" (i.e. Evans was not meaningfully involved but Impulse had printed the album covers) teamed with Roswell Rudd's Impulse album Everywhere, in its entirety.

The three Taylor tracks were reissued by the ezz-thetics label in 2021 on Mixed To Unit Structures Revisited.

== Reception ==
Professional ratings
Review scores
Source	Rating
AllMusic	4/5 stars
The Penguin Guide to Jazz	3.5/4 stars

The AllMusic review by Scott Yanow notes that "This date as a whole was one of Cecil Taylor's last ones on which he still had a connection (if loose) to more traditional straight-ahead jazz", and states: "Although not Roswell Rudd's greatest album, there are enough fascinating ensembles on this set for it to nearly hold its own with Cecil Taylor's more essential session".

The authors of The Penguin Guide to Jazz awarded the album 3½ stars, and, regarding Taylor's contribution, commented: "Still poised between some measure of hard-bop language and his own developments, the music has a somewhat jolted feel, as if three tracks and 22 minutes simply wasn't sufficient to project the wealth of ideas Taylor had going on; even though this is the first disc to feature such collaborators as Lyons and Murray, everything is still trying to fall into place... it feels like an unexplored nook in the music."

Writing for All About Jazz, Jim Santella stated that the Taylor tracks possess "a fascinating sense of direction and cohesion", and commented: "At times sharing a unison melody or riff, and at times improvising simultaneously, the ensemble provides a meaty subject and an enjoyable rainbow of sound patterns. The album stretches from readily accessible material to avant-garde fringe jazz. Recommended."

In a review of the 2021 ezz-thetics reissue of the Taylor tracks for All About Jazz, Chris May commented: "In 1961, Taylor's style, though already individual, was some distance from being fully formed. But the sublime 'Mixed,' at just short of thirteen minutes the longest of the three tracks, is getting there. Roswell Rudd and trumpeter Ted Curson turn the quintet into a sextet and the dense ensemble passages are signature Taylor, as is his warp-speed pianism and the solo by his longtime alto saxophonist Jimmy Lyons. Tenor saxophonist Archie Shepp, still at the start of his recording career but already a seasoned Taylor sideperson, also kicks it out." In a separate All About Jazz review of the reissued tracks, Mark Corroto wrote: "The music from Mixed is, for lack of a better term, swingin.' Lyons and Shepp's saxophones address the growing storm whipped up by Ornette Coleman while the pulse of the music threatens to tear itself away from the bebop revolution. Revisiting this skillfully remastered music sixty years on might not give us that original 'shock of the new' experience, but it remains quite surprising. Taylor orchestrates not unlike Charles Mingus as a means to proffer his growing confidence in his keyboard language."

== Track listing ==
1. "Bulbs" (Cecil Taylor) – 6:49
2. "Pots" (Taylor) – 5:44
3. "Mixed" (Taylor) – 10:08
4. "Everywhere" (Beaver Harris) – 11:32
5. "Yankee No-How" (Roswell Rudd) – 12:03
6. "Respects" (Rudd) – 11:39
7. "Satan's Dance" (Giuseppi Logan) – 12:01

- Recorded in New York City on October 10, 1961 (tracks 1–3) & San Francisco on February 1, 1966 (tracks 4–7)

== Personnel ==
- Cecil Taylor - piano (tracks 1–3)
- Jimmy Lyons - alto saxophone (tracks 1–3)
- Archie Shepp - tenor saxophone (tracks 1–3)
- Henry Grimes - bass (tracks 1–3)
- Sunny Murray - drums (tracks 1–3)
- Ted Curson - trumpet (track 3)
- Roswell Rudd - trombone (tracks 3–7)
- Giuseppi Logan - flute, bass clarinet (tracks 4–7)
- Lewis Worrell - bass (tracks 4–7)
- Charlie Haden - bass (tracks 4–7)
- Beaver Harris - drums (tracks 4–7)
- Robin Kenyatta - alto saxophone (tracks 4–7)
