= Call Cobbs Jr. =

American jazz keyboardist

Call Cobbs
- Birth name: Harvey Call Cobbs Jr.
- Born: January 30, 1911 Urbana, Ohio, U.S.
- Died: September 21, 1971 (aged 60) The Bronx, New York, U.S.
- Genres: Jazz · free jazz
- Instrument(s): Piano · electric harpsichord · electric organ

Harvey Call Cobbs Jr. (January 30, 1911 – September 21, 1971) was an American jazz pianist, electric harpsichordist, and organist. He is remembered for his work with saxophonist Albert Ayler in the mid- and late-1960s.

== Early life ==
Cobbs was born in Urbana, Ohio, to Harvey Call Cobbs Sr. and Ethel Hill Cobbs. His father, known as Harry Cobbs, was a church janitor. In his youth, Cobbs served as companion and guide to the pianist Art Tatum and later accompanied Billie Holiday and replaced Hampton Hawes in the band of Wardell Gray.

== Career ==
Cobbs worked and recorded with the alto saxophonist Johnny Hodges in 1954, when Hodges' band included John Coltrane. He studied the Schillinger System of musical composition.

He is best remembered for his work with the free jazz saxophonist Albert Ayler from 1964 through 1970, playing piano, rocksichord, and electronic organ in live performances and recordings. He also acted as Ayler's copyist and musical director. When Ayler's body was found floating in the East River in New York City on November 25, 1970, Cobbs was called upon to identify the body.

== Death ==
Cobbs was killed in a hit and run collision on September 21, 1971. He died at Jacobi Medical Center in The Bronx at the age of 60.

== Discography ==
With Albert Ayler

- Swing Low Sweet Spiritual (Osmosis, 1964 [1971])
- Spirits Rejoice (ESP-Disk, 1965)
- Love Cry (Impulse!, 1967)
- Live in Greenwich Village
- New Grass (Impulse!, 1969)
- Nuits de la Fondation Maeght Vols. 1 & 2 (Shandar, 1970)
- Holy Ghost: Rare & Unissued Recordings (1962–70) ( Revenant, 2004)
- Live on the Riviera (ESP-Disk, 2005)

With John Coltrane

- First Giant Steps. Rare Live Recordings

With Johnny Hodges

- The Blues (Norgran, 1952–54, [1955])
- Used to Be Duke (Norgran, 1954)

With Jack McVea

- Two Timin' Baby (Juke Box Lil)

With Jimmy Rushing

- 1946–1953 (Jazz Classics)

== Sources ==
- Call Cobbs: Credits. Allmusic. Accessed July 2, 2007.
- "Final Bar." Downbeat, November 11, 1971: p. 9.
