= Stockholm, Berlin 1966 =

Live album by Albert Ayler
- Released: 2011
- Recorded: November 3 & 10, 1966
- Venue: Berlin, Germany and Stockholm, Sweden
- Genre: Jazz
- Length: 59:11
- Label: hatOLOGY hatOLOGY 717
- Producer: Bosse Broberg, Ralph Schulte-Bahrenberg

Stockholm, Berlin 1966 is a live album by saxophonist and composer Albert Ayler, recorded in Europe in 1966 and released on the Swiss hatOLOGY label in 2011. The Berlin tracks were previously released on The Berlin Concerts - 1966 (Relyable Records), Albert Ayler Live In Europe 1964 - 1966 (Landscape Records), and the compilation Holy Ghost: Rare & Unissued Recordings (1962–70) (Revenant). All of the tracks were reissued on a 2021 Hat Hut release titled Albert Ayler Quintet 1966: Berlin, Lörrach, Paris & Stockholm. Revisited.

== Background ==
The Stockholm and Berlin recordings were made during Ayler's thirty-day 1966 European tour, which lasted from November 3 through December 2. The tour, which also included Lörrach, Rotterdam, Paris, and Copenhagen, came about when Joachim-Ernst Berendt, director of the Berlin Jazz Festival, asked promoter George Wein to include Ayler's group in his annual festival tour. (John Coltrane had also been invited to participate, but declined due to health issues.) Henry Grimes and Sunny Murray were unable to accompany the band on the tour, so Ayler asked bassist William Folwell and drummer Beaver Harris to join him. The group also included Ayler's brother Donald on trumpet and violinist Michel Sampson.

According to Ayler biographer Jeff Schwartz, the recordings show Ayler using a modular approach to his music, with thematic sections that can be reshuffled interspersed with improvisations, including brief solos by Harris and Folwell. Schwartz noted that Ayler's vocalizations on Pharoah Sanders' "Japan" on the European recordings are the first time he is heard as a singer. He also suggested that the singing may be an extension of the moaning sounds that Sunny Murray emitted while playing the drums.

== Reception ==
Professional ratings
Review scores
Source	Rating
All About Jazz	5/5 stars
The Guardian	4/5 stars
Jazzwise	5/5 stars

In a review for The Guardian, John Fordham wrote: "Ayler's blazing shows were following sets by Dave Brubeck, Stan Getz and other more orthodox jazz artists, but his finales roused the European crowds to ecstatic acclaim just the same. Sometimes the music sounds like the work of a dishevelled Salvation Army band, sometimes like a series of strange, hooting operatic arias, in which jaunty themes Sonny Rollins might edge their way into the midst of big, rapturously lamenting harmonies. The repertoire is much the same from both gigs..., and has an even more emotional quiver for the addition of fine Dutch violinist Michel Samson, meshing evocatively with the vibrato and clarion lead-lines of Ayler's trumpeter brother Donald."

Writing for Jazzwise, Edwin Pouncey called the album an "astonishing document", and stated that "both performances feature Ayler and his group at the peak of their collective powers. Already legendary among free jazz enthusiasts, they were greeted in Europe with the kind of enthusiasm that was usually reserved for groups like The Beatles." He commented: "The music played here is a selection of his more famous compositions..., spiritual anthems that have their roots in the New Orleans jazz tradition, but are also teetering on the brink of abandoning jazz altogether – sounding at times like contemporary classical scores."

Glenn Astarita, in a review for All About Jazz, referred to the recording as "a desert island quality album", and praised "Truth is Marching In", stating that it "could be a cleverly articulated slant on Stephen Foster or Daniel S. Warner's 'The Truth is Marching On.' It's a heavy duty yet harmonically enticing ballad, sprinkled by the saxophonist's authoritative spiritual presence overtop; a prayerful motif summoning Americana lore, where the resounding primary theme segues into a buoyant march-groove spiked with notions of triumph and turmoil. With brazen outbursts amid dips in the action, the band reenergizes via a sweet-toned finale."

Phil Johnson called the album "revelatory", and wrote: "the music is startlingly melodic in both cases, with the leader's sax singing more than squawking. I'm converted: this is extraordinary stuff."

== Track listing ==
Tracks 3a and 7a by Donald Ayler. Track 4b by Pharoah Sanders. Remaining tracks by Albert Ayler.

1. "Truth Is Marching In" - 9:15
2. "Omega (Is The Alpha)" - 10:36
3. "Our Prayer - Bells" - 7:51
4. "Infinite Spirit - Japan" - 3:53
5. "Truth Is Marching In" - 7:25
6. "Omega (Is The Alpha)" - 3:36
7. "Our Prayer - Truth Is Marching In" - 5:06
8. "Ghosts - Bells" - 11:29

Tracks 1–4 recorded November 10, 1966 by Swedish Radio Ltd. at Konserthuset, Stockholm. Tracks 5–8 recorded November 3, 1966 by WDR at Philharmonie Berlin, Jazzfestival.

== Personnel ==
- Albert Ayler – tenor saxophone
- Don Ayler – trumpet
- Michel Sampson – violin
- William Folwell – bass
- Beaver Harris – drums
