= Nefertiti, the Beautiful One Has Come =

Live album by Cecil Taylor
- Released: 1963
- Recorded: November 23, 1962
- Venues: Café Montmartre, Copenhagen, Denmark
- Genres: Avant-garde jazz; free jazz
- Length: 118:13
- Label: Revenant
- Producer: Alan Bates

Cecil Taylor chronology
| Into the Hot (1961) | Nefertiti, the Beautiful One Has Come (1963) | Unit Structures (1966) |

Professional ratings
Review scores
| Source | Rating |
|---|---|
| Allmusic | 4.5/5 stars |
| Penguin Guide to Jazz | 👑 |
| The Rolling Stone Jazz Record Guide | 5/5 stars |

Nefertiti, the Beautiful One Has Come is a 1963 live album by the American jazz pianist Cecil Taylor, recorded at the Café Montmartre in Copenhagen on November 23, 1962. This concert is nearly all that Taylor recorded from 1962 to 1966.

== Background ==
In 1962, Taylor went to Europe with saxophonist Jimmy Lyons and drummer Sunny Murray. Bassist Henry Grimes was also slated to join the tour, but fell ill at the last moment. During that time, the group made a stylistic breakthrough. Murray stated in 2000 that "we were in Sweden and we had finally decided to be free... The way Cecil and Jimmy and I were playing, we could absorb any different thing at that period, because we were so fresh!"

Part of the Copenhagen concert was released on the album Live at the Café Montmartre with more following on Nefertiti, the Beautiful One Has Come. Material from the concert was also issued as Trance (Black Lion), Innovations, and What's New. The complete Café Montmartre recordings were released by Revenant in 1997. The one extant recording of Albert Ayler performing with Taylor's group at Café Montmartre was released in 2004 on the box set Holy Ghost.

== Reception ==
Nefertiti, the Beautiful one Has Come has been praised as "a landmark performance." David Borgo wrote that it "marks... the unalterable trajectory of Taylor's music to move without standard song forms and uniform rhythmic pulse." According to the authors of The Penguin Guide to Jazz, awarding it a perfect score, it "...should be accounted among the greatest live recordings in jazz...the playing has an irresistible momentum that creates its own kind of rocking swing, the pulse indefinable but palpable, the rhythm moving in waves from the drummer's kit. Lyons shapes his bebopper's vocabulary into gritty flurries of notes, a man caught in a squall and fighting his way through it and over it...Here he is sharing in the discovery of a fierce new world."

Regarding the title track, Shaun Brady wrote: "Murray begins with stuttering accents that grow increasingly clamorous and eventually cohere into a tsunami of sheer momentum, lifting, propelling and unsettling Taylor and saxophonist Jimmy Lyons. At one moment he batters them forward with monolithic force, the next slamming on the brakes, leaving them suspended in mid-air."

== Track listing ==
All compositions by Cecil Taylor except where noted.

1. "Trance" – 9:12
2. "Call" – 9:00
3. "Lena" – 6:58
4. "D Trad, That's What" – 21:26
5. "Call [Second Version]" – 6:37
6. "What's New?" (Johnny Burke, Bob Haggart) – 12:11
7. "Nefertiti, the Beautiful One Has Come" – 9:11
8. "Lena [Second Version]" – 14:21
9. "Nefertiti, the Beautiful One Has Come [Second Version]" – 8:07
10. "D Trad, That's What [Second Version]" – 20:08

1–4 first issued on Live at the Café Montmartre (1963)
6–9 first issued on Nefertiti, the Beautiful One Has Come (1965)
1–4 and 6–9 first collected on Nefertiti, the Beautiful One Has Come (1976)
5 first issued on Trance (1996)
10 first issued on the Revenant issue of Nefertiti, the Beautiful One Has Come (1997)

== Personnel ==
- Cecil Taylor – piano
- Jimmy Lyons – alto saxophone
- Sunny Murray – drums
