= Live at Slug's Saloon =

Live album by Albert Ayler
- Released: 1982
- Recorded: May 1, 1966
- Venue: Slugs' Saloon, New York City
- Genre: Jazz
- Label: Base Records / DIW / ESP-Disk

Albert Ayler chronology
Spirits Rejoice (1965)	Live at Slug's Saloon (1982)	Albert Ayler (1964-1966)

Live at Slug's Saloon is a live album by the American jazz saxophonist Albert Ayler recorded on May 1, 1966, at Slugs' Saloon in New York City. The music was originally released in 1982 as Albert Ayler Quintet Live at Slug's Saloon volumes 1 and 2 on Base Records (Italy), DIW Records (Japan), and ESP-Disk (U.S.), and, over the years, was reissued by a variety of small labels under different titles. A CD containing both volumes, plus an additional track recorded at the same concert, was released by ESP-Disk with the title Slugs' Saloon. On the album, Ayler plays tenor saxophone, and is accompanied by his brother Donald Ayler on trumpet, Michel Samson on violin, Lewis Worrell on bass, and Ronald Shannon Jackson on drums.

== Background ==
Slugs' Saloon, which opened in 1964, was a small club on the Lower East Side of Manhattan, and had a reputation for being conducive to the presentation of adventurous music. Ayler frequently played there during 1965 and 1966, and Sun Ra's Arkestra performed there every Monday night beginning in March 1966, and continuing for eighteen months. Slugs' was also known as a dirty and dangerous place located in a rough area, and was described by jazz critic Bill Smith as featuring "spit and sawdust" with knife-wielding audience members.

According to bassist and Ayler biographer Jeff Schwartz, the May 1, 1966 recording heard on the album is "an authorized bootleg, a tape made by an audience member," with poor sound quality and mis-labeled song titles. However, Schwartz also wrote that the album is "essential" in that it "shows the beginnings of profound change in Ayler's music, and it represents a structural experiment... that is exceptional within his recordings." Schwartz noted that the music on the album is organized as a continuous medley, with themes from a grab-bag of sources, and with Ayler leading the group from one theme to the next via cues, and that it represents a turn from free improvisation toward composed material. Ayler commented: "I'd like to play something... that people can hum. And I want to play songs like I used to sing when I was real small. Folk melodies that all the people will understand. I'd use those melodies as a start and have different simple melodies going in and out of a piece. From simple melody to complicated textures to simplicity again and then back to the more dense, the more complex sounds." At the same time, Ayler's soloing "was becoming more violent than ever. Often... he will spend his entire solo wailing the highest note he can reach, pausing only for breath. He may be imitating the sound of glossolalia, speaking in tongues..."

The album, along with the April 16–17, 1966 tracks on the compilation Holy Ghost: Rare & Unissued Recordings (1962–70), represents the entirety of Ronald Shannon Jackson's recorded appearances with Ayler. Jackson recalled: "I'd been playing by myself a lot, and I'd played with duos and trios and orchestras and choirs, but never with someone who told me to play everything I could possibly play. It blew my mind. I could try anything. All four mediums--both feet, both hands--used to the maximum, with total concentration in each one. You know, the whole set-up was so massive: the total spiritual self, which can be a million different things at one time, but trying to make it concise and particular at a given moment. It was like someone taking a plug out of a dam... Albert really opened me up as far as playing. I had never experienced totally playing before. Up until then my work had been playing background: the 'ching-ching-a-ding' line... Albert was the type of person who wouldn't say 'I want this' or 'I want that.' He'd just say 'Play! Fill it up with sound!' So from that being ingrained in me, it allowed me to just play. It was a very good experience of my life. We played together for six to eight months." Jackson would leave Ayler's band shortly after the recording was made due to the fact that gigs with Ayler were infrequent and did not pay well.

== Reception ==
Professional ratings
Review scores
Source	Rating
AllMusic (Volume 1)	4.5/5 stars
AllMusic (Volume 2)	3/5 stars
The Penguin Guide to Jazz	3/4 stars

In a review for AllMusic, Scott Yanow described the music as "both futuristic (with extroverted emotions expressed in free improvisations) and ancient (New Orleans marching band rhythms, group riffing, and folkish melodies)". Thom Jurek wrote: "The Slug's Saloon dates are among the recordings that established Albert Ayler's reputation as the iconoclastic legend he was... This is Ayler at his most beguiling and powerful." Regarding "Truth Is Marching In", he commented: "Ayler just turns his saxophone on the audience like he's some Old Testament prophet, screaming and screeching through the middle as Jackson sticks with him every step of the way, triple timing his bull-roaring wail... speaking in tongues has been realized, although everyone on the bandstand and in the audience realizes what's happening." Jurek called "Our Prayer" "an atonal fury of pure gospel shouting and blues hollering to the heavens", and referred to "Bells" as "truly astonishing" and "Ayler's masterpiece", stating: "By 16 minutes the cover has melted from your skull and the sun is shining from within and without and you have been transformed forever. Yeah, you need this that bad...what are you waiting for?"

In an article for Pitchfork, Mark Richardson described the music as "long medleys where one song segued into the next, and the wild energy of [Ayler's] earlier solos were being channeled into unbearably intense statements of melody. The music was not 'free' in the strict sense of the word, but it was open and welcoming and utterly unique, with a deep feeling of joy permeating the whole." Writing for All About Jazz, Francis Lo Kee commented that the album "offers catharsis", and wrote: "This music as a whole doesn't use harmony as a basis for improvisation. It has a kind of trance-like quality that arises from repeating the nursery rhyme-ish, calypso-like melodies over and over again. It brings jazz back to an earlier time, perhaps before Louis Armstrong and New Orleans jazz, which emphasized collective improvisation based on simple melodies."

The authors of the Penguin Guide to Jazz Recordings wrote: "this is a session of incendiary power and ranks with some of the very best Ayler performances... However, there are some strange sound problems in this edition which can make listening very difficult."

== Track listing ==
Tracks 1, 3, 4, 5 by Albert Ayler; track 2 by Donald Ayler

1. "Truth Is Marching In" - 10:10
2. "Our Prayer" - 12:19
3. "Bells" - 18:00
4. "Ghosts" - 23:08
5. "Initiation" - 16:32
- Tracks 1 and 2 originally released on Albert Ayler Quintet Live at Slug's Saloon Volume 1. Tracks 3 and 4 originally released on Albert Ayler Quintet Live at Slug's Saloon Volume 2.
- Recorded May 1, 1966, at Slugs' Saloon, New York City

== Personnel ==
- Albert Ayler - tenor saxophone
- Donald Ayler - trumpet
- Michel Samson - violin
- Lewis Worrell - bass
- Ron Jackson - drums
