= Spirits (Albert Ayler album) =

Studio album by Albert Ayler
- Released: 1966
- Recorded: February 24, 1964
- Studio: Atlantic Studios, New York City
- Genre: Free jazz
- Length: 35:35
- Label: Debut (Denmark) DEB 146; Freedom AL 1018
- Producer: Robert Altshuler and Jørgen Frigaard

Albert Ayler chronology
Ghosts (1965)	Spirits (1966)	Swing Low Sweet Spiritual (1964)

Witches & Devils Cover

Spirits is an album by American free jazz saxophonist Albert Ayler recorded in New York City in 1964 and first released on the Danish Debut label then later released on the Freedom label as Witches & Devils.

== Reception ==
Professional ratings
Review scores
Source	Rating
Allmusic	3/5 stars
The Rolling Stone Jazz Record Guide	5/5 stars
The Penguin Guide to Jazz Recordings	3.5/4 stars

The Allmusic review by Thom Jurek awarded the album 3 stars stating "This is a revealing if not completely satisfying recording". Jurek wrote "the quartet with Grimes and Murray... offers the first real glimpse of Ayler in command. His statuesque take on the tonal and timbral fronts comes from both Ornette Coleman and the honking R&B bar-walkers. And in looking inside the various registers on the title cut, he explores the emotions inherent in timbral modulation without refracting the notes themselves too much. He moves from a whisper of great tenderness to a bloodcurdling scream, and it all sounds natural... On 'Holy, Holy'... he goes for the upper register... screeching to the point of sounding like a crying child, quoting hymns and blues tunes throughout."

The authors of The Penguin Guide to Jazz awarded the album 3½ stars, and commented: "This is the first recorded glimpse of Ayler in full flow. He reaches peaks of intensity here that are among the most arresting and evocative in his brief career... The real action... is between saxophone and drums and Murray is a towering presence throughout."

All About Jazz stated "The names on the cover look good: Albert Ayler, Henry Grimes, and Sunny Murray. But somehow the parts never add up, though. Sure, the album's four tunes wiggle plenty, producing the agitated jazz Ayler often preached; but, the motions on Spirits, unlike Ayler's better moments, resolve too very little... True Ayler diehards will undoubtedly gobble this recording up, but those in search of quality best look elsewhere".

Val Wilmer wrote that Spirits "contains some of Ayler's most majestic playing and marks his first appearance on record with musicians of his own stature."

Amiri Baraka wrote that Ayler's playing on Spirits is "a revelation" and that the musicians on the album "seem interested in getting to where they, themselves, are, rather than just showing up 'hip,' playing all the accepted licks of the day." He states that the tune Witches and Devils "should frighten anyone given to mystical involvement or even simple impressionistic reaction. It is a scary tune, going deep beneath what we say is real to that other portion of ourselves that is, finally, realer and much less familiar."

== Track listing ==
All compositions by Albert Ayler, although according to Mutawaf Schaheed, the song "Witches and Devils" was actually composed by Norman Howard althoght credited to Ayler

1. "Spirits" - 6:35
2. "Witches and Devils" - 11:55
3. "Holy, Holy" - 11:00
4. "Saints" - 6:05

== Personnel ==
- Albert Ayler - tenor saxophone
- Norman Howard - trumpet
- Henry Grimes - bass (tracks 1, 2 & 4)
- Earle Henderson - bass (tracks 2 & 3)
- Sonny Murray - drums
