= Prophecy (Albert Ayler album) =

Live album by Albert Ayler
- Released: 1975
- Recorded: June 14, 1964 at the Cellar Café, West 90th Street, New York City
- Genre: Free jazz
- Length: 41:55
- Label: ESP-Disk ESP 3030

Albert Ayler chronology
Swing Low Sweet Spiritual (1964)	Prophecy (1975)	Spiritual Unity (1964)

Prophecy is a live album by American free jazz saxophonist Albert Ayler recorded in New York City on June 14, 1964 and first released in 1975 on the ESP-Disk label.

== Background ==
The album features Ayler's trio, with bassist Gary Peacock and drummer Sunny Murray, and contains five tracks representing roughly half of that evening's concert, which was taped by Paul Haines. A recording of the entire concert, including five additional pieces, was released by the German label In Respect as Albert Smiles With Sunny. According to Sunny Murray, Bernard Stollman, founder of ESP-Disk, "released Prophecy after Albert died, without Albert's signature, but because I also had a copy of the same tape I released mine through a company in Germany... as a correct move for me and Al... [M]y tape was better quality than his and also at the correct speed, so mine sounds better." (According to Val Wilmer, Ayler's recordings for ESP-Disk were made "against the advice of Cecil Taylor and other musicians who thought that artists should hold out for a price commensurate with their talent." Ayler justified his decision, stating: "I felt my art was so important that I had to get it out. At that time I was musically out of this world. I knew I had to play this music for the people.")

The additional tracks from Albert Smiles with Sunny were reissued by Revenant Records on Holy Ghost: Rare & Unissued Recordings (1962–70). In addition, all of the June 14, 1964 tracks, plus the single May 1, 1965 track from the album Bells, were reissued by ESP-Disk as Bells & Prophecy: Expanded Edition.

The Ayler trio would go on to record Spiritual Unity less than a month later.

== Reception ==
Professional ratings
Review scores
Source	Rating
Allmusic	3/5 stars
The Rolling Stone Jazz Record Guide	5/5 stars
The Penguin Guide to Jazz	3.5/4 stars

The Allmusic review by Scott Yanow awarded the album 3 stars stating: "Ayler alternated the simple march-like themes with wild and very free improvisations which owe little if anything to the bop tradition, or even his contemporaries in the avant-garde. Ayler always had his own individual message, and his ESP sessions find him in consistently explorative form".

The authors of The Penguin Guide to Jazz awarded the album 3½ stars, and stated that the album "was an important session in laying down some of the basic language of the saxophonist's career."

All About Jazz commented: "Though the trio had honed a group sound and method comprising slow and loping or extremely fast themes; Murray's constant percussive chatter and vocal wailing providing an alternate pure-sound springboard; Peacock's constant harmonic filigree creating yet another aural web, these are presented in Prophecy as a much looser framework".

== Track listing ==
All compositions by Albert Ayler

1. "Spirits" - 7:15
2. "Wizard" - 8:00
3. "Ghosts (First Variation)" - 10:00
4. "Prophecy" - 6:35
5. "Ghosts (Second Variation)" - 7:40

== Personnel ==
- Albert Ayler - tenor saxophone
- Gary Peacock - bass
- Sonny Murray - drums
