= The Hilversum Session =

Studio album by Albert Ayler
- Released: 1980
- Recorded: November 9, 1964
- Studio: A radio studio in Hilversum, The Netherlands
- Genre: Free jazz
- Length: 40:21
- Label: Osmosis

Albert Ayler chronology
| Ghosts (1964) | The Hilversum Session (1980) | Bells (1965) |

The Hilversum Session is an album by American free jazz saxophonist Albert Ayler recorded at a radio studio in Hilversum, The Netherlands on November 9, 1964 and first released in 1980 on the now-defunct Dutch Osmosis label. It was later re-released on DIW, Coppens, ESP, and Modern Silence. In 2016, the tracks that appeared on The Hilversum Session were re-released by hatOLOGY on the European Radio Studio Recordings 1964.

== Background ==
In August 1964, the Cafe Montmartre in Copenhagen, where Ayler had previously played with Cecil Taylor, invited Ayler and his trio, which included bassist Gary Peacock and drummer Sunny Murray, to return for an extended engagement. Despite having been offered only a one-way ticket, Ayler accepted the terms with the goal of exposing his music to a wider audience, given the bleak prospects and lack of interest in the United States. (According to Val Wilmer, "Peacock had been without food for fifteen days when Ayler dragged him from his bed to make the trip.") Don Cherry was already in Europe when the trio arrived, and joined them when they arrived. During the tour, which included Holland, Sweden, and Denmark, the group recorded material that would later be released on The Copenhagen Tapes (recorded September 3 at the Cafe Montmartre and September 10 at a Danish Radio studio), Ghosts (later released as Vibrations, recorded September 14 in Copenhagen), and The Hilversum Session, which consists of performances of familiar Ayler tunes such as "Ghosts" and "Spirits" ("C.A.C." is nearly identical to "The Wizard", which appeared on Spiritual Unity) plus one by Cherry ("Infant Happiness"), as well as one new Ayler tune ("No Name").

== Reception ==
Professional ratings
Review scores
| Source | Rating |
|---|---|
| AllMusic | 4.5/5 stars |
| The Penguin Guide to Jazz | 3/4 stars |

The AllMusic review by Thom Jurek awarded the album 4.5 stars stating: "The band... had been playing Ayler's tunes for months and were uncanny in their ability to hear one another and improvise together at that point... This set is a defining moment, not just historically, but musically. The intense listening and interplay that goes on here is inspiring... These cats play together with the kind of intuition and foresight only a seasoned group can; they understand the nuances of the language they are speaking and know how to offer those to the listener emotionally, musically, and even culturally." Concerning the contributions of Peacock and Murray, Jurek wrote that they "may have played better elsewhere, but they never played with the kind of deep communication they enjoyed together as a rhythm section and with other front-line players than they do here." Regarding Cherry's playing, Jurek wrote: "the inveterate and outrageously talented listener/musician is in full bloom, untethered as a soloist, yet, like the other three, remaining an inextricable part of a band."

Scott Yanow wrote that the quartet is a "fairly ideal group" for Ayler, and that the recording is "not for the faint of heart." Concerning the chemistry between the members of the quartet, Val Wilmer wrote: "The more lyrical extrovert Cherry, with his quick-thinking and open mind, was the ideal partner for Ayler's loosely assembled melodies and darker moods." Mark Richardson wrote that "every note they recorded together remains worth hearing" and stated that The Hilversum Session is a demonstration of "how brilliantly the group gelled."

Jeff Schwartz, bassist, Ayler biographer, and author of "Free Jazz: A Research and Information Guide", referred to the recordings made during the 1964 European tour as "amongst the greatest jazz ever recorded.". Regarding The Hilversum Session, Schwartz stated that it "seems more like a live performance in the openness of the players' approach, with more energy in the rhythm section and more simultaneous blowing by the horns." He also wrote: "The addition of Cherry to the group is only one of the many things that makes these performances so outstanding. Peacock plays arco (bowing) at length for the first time on record with Ayler and this enables him to play long tones with vibrato and extract waves of harmonics, both in imitation of Ayler, and to function as a third melodic voice... Murray too plays a greater variety of textures on this recording, perhaps aware that he is being decently recorded, for the first time with Ayler... There is a much greater sense of ensemble and textural variety in this group than in prior Ayler aggregations. The quartet conjures the sounds of marching bands and chamber music, as well as those of traditional and avant-garde jazz. Murray introduces vast plains of silence into his playing, leaving one horn alone with the bass, the two horns in duet, or the soloist a cappella. Sometimes also, all four players will improvise together, making the New Orleans collective improvisation that was latent on Spiritual Unity explicit. All of these possibilities would be further explored by Ayler in future, larger, ensembles."

== Track listing ==
1. "Angels" (Ayler) - 6:50
2. "C.A.C." (Ayler) - 4:58
3. "Ghosts" (Ayler) - 7:28
4. "Infant Happiness" (Cherry) - 6:04
5. "Spirits" (Ayler) - 9:10
6. "No Name" (Ayler) - 5:40

== Personnel ==
- Albert Ayler - tenor saxophone
- Don Cherry - cornet
- Gary Peacock - bass
- Sunny Murray - drums
