= Homework (Sunny Murray, Bob Dickie, and Robert Andreano album) =

Live album by Sunny Murray, Bob Dickie, and Robert Andreano
- Released: 1997
- Recorded: May 30, 1994
- Venue: 816 South Street, Philadelphia, Pennsylvania
- Genre: Free jazz
- Label: Super Secret Sound; 3SLP010

Sunny Murray chronology
Illuminators (1996)	Homework (1997)	We Are Not at the Opera (1998)

Homework is a live album by drummer Sunny Murray, bassist Bob Dickie, and guitarist Robert Andreano. It was recorded in May 1994 in Philadelphia, Pennsylvania, and was released in 1997 by Super Secret Sound. The album was remastered and reissued in 2019 by NoBusiness Records.

== Reception ==
Professional ratings
Review scores
Source	Rating
DownBeat	4/5 stars
All About Jazz	3.5/5 stars

In a review for DownBeat, Herb Boyd stated that, in comparison with his work with Cecil Taylor and Albert Ayler, "on Homework... Murray is no less relentless, and the signature musicality he derived from his drums is readily apparent on the occasions when they blend with Bob Dickie's bass clarinet. Years ago, musicologist and writer Valerie Wilmer commented that Murray possessed the ability to lead whoever performed with him. It's true on this date and guitarist Robert Andreano is a most attentive compatriot, one who has done his homework."

Pierre Crépon and Marc Chaloin, writing for The New York City Jazz Record, commented: "The session sounds completely improvised, of the 'let's go in and see what happens' variety. And what happens is quite surprising: Murray's main register here is not the free pulse he is known for, but grooves that tread binary grounds... 'Why You Need a Lawyer When Your Pants on Fire' is... a remarkable opportunity to listen to elements of the drummer's classic style, as he goes into a fascinating interiorized dancing, anchored by his left foot hi-hat work... Homework documents a brief moment in his musical life, whose richness made it possible for it to be unique."

In an article for All About Jazz, John Sharpe stated: "Murray tailors his playing to the situation, fitting in with his confreres, though also displaying enough of the unruly embellishments and dashes of brilliance which made his name. He maintains momentum throughout, often but not always without recourse to regular meter... In spite of Murray's legendary status, both Andreano and Dickie avoid being overwhelmed. In fact, during the finest episodes, they more than hold their own in bracing three-way conversations... This is a welcome opportunity to hear Murray in relaxed form during a less well-documented phase of his career."

Edwin Pouncey of JazzWise remarked that the recording finds Murray in "fine form as he effortlessly jams along with Dickie's weaving bass patterns and Andreano's bouts of Hendrix-meets-Sharrock styled fluid guitar-playing... the intimate vibe that permeates the set is both endearing and, after several replays, teetering on the edge of becoming enduring."

Jazz Weekly's George W. Harris commented: "Murray is loose as a goose as Andreano abstractly rocks out on 'Homework' while he lays down a mellow groove on a bluesy 'Swell.' The team trudges through a tribal 'Memorial Day' with some palpable guitar pickings, and the team slashes through the acid rock of 'In.' Jazzy head bangers."

== Track listing ==
All compositions by Sunny Murray, Bob Dickie, and Robert Andreano.

1. "Swell" – 9:07
2. "Homework" – 13:15
3. "Good Things" – 3:39
4. "Why You Need a Lawyer When Your Pants on Fire" – 11:12
5. "Memorial Day" – 6:37
6. "In" – 1:36

== Personnel ==
- Sunny Murray – drums
- Bob Dickie – bass, bass clarinet
- Robert Andreano – guitar, bass
