= Spiritual Unity =

Studio album by the Albert Ayler Trio
- Released: May 1965
- Recorded: July 10, 1964
- Studio: Variety Arts (Manhattan)
- Genre: Free jazz
- Length: 29:13
- Label: ESP-Disk
- Producer: Bernard Stollman

Albert Ayler chronology
Prophecy (1964)	Spiritual Unity (1965)	New York Eye and Ear Control (1965)

Spiritual Unity is a 1965 studio album by the American free jazz saxophonist Albert Ayler. It was recorded on July 10, 1964, with bassist Gary Peacock and drummer Sunny Murray. It was the first album recorded for Bernard Stollman's ESP-Disk label, and it brought the "shockingly different" Ayler to international attention. It also established ESP-Disk as "a major source for avant-garde jazz".

== Background ==
In late December 1963, Bernard Stollman, who had been toying with the idea of starting a record label, went, at the insistence of a friend, to hear Ayler at the Baby Grand Café on 125th Street in Harlem. Ayler had moved to New York City earlier in the year, and had recently been playing with a variety of musicians, including Ornette Coleman, with whom Ayler made an informal recording earlier that month, and Cecil Taylor, with whom he would perform on New Years Eve on a concert at Philharmonic Hall, Lincoln Center that would also feature the John Coltrane quintet and Art Blakey and the Jazz Messengers. According to Stollman, upon arriving at the Baby Grand Cafe,

Elmo Hope was at the piano, with his trio, on an elevated stage. I sat and listened to them. Several minutes later, a small man in a gray leather suit, holding a large saxophone, brushed by me and jumped up on the stage. He had a black beard, with a little patch of white in it. He was not introduced and, ignoring the trio, he began to blow his horn. The other musicians stopped and looked at him. No words were exchanged. Elmo Hope quietly closed his piano, the bass player parked his bass, the drummer put his sticks down, and they all sat back to listen. He was playing solo, and he kept right on playing for twenty to thirty minutes, just a burst of music. It seemed like a second; it was no time at all! Then he stopped and jumped down from the platform, covered with sweat.

Stollman then approached Ayler, told him he was starting a record label, and asked him to be his first artist, offering a $500 advance. Ayler agreed, and stated that he would contact Stollman after fulfulling a commitment to record material at Atlantic Studios.

In early 1964, Ayler briefly joined a quartet led by Paul Bley. This occasion introduced Ayler to bassist Gary Peacock, who had been playing with Bley for several years, and who had also recently recorded with Bill Evans. Bley's group also included drummer Sunny Murray, with whom Ayler had played in Cecil Taylor's group. The Bley quartet did not record, and made only one public appearance at the Take 3 coffeehouse in Greenwich Village. By late spring, Ayler, Peacock, and Murray had formed a trio after Peacock left Miles Davis' group, where he was substituting for Ron Carter. On June 14, the trio played at the Cellar Café in New York and recorded the material that would be released on the album Prophecy, which features some of the pieces that would be recorded for Spiritual Unity less than a month later.

== Recording and release ==
That same month, Ayler called Stollman and told him he would like to make a recording. According to Val Wilmer, Ayler's decision to join Stollman's label, which would be called ESP-Disk, was made "against the advice of Cecil Taylor and other musicians who thought that artists should hold out for a price commensurate with their talent." Ayler justified his decision, stating: "I felt my art was so important that I had to get it out. At that time I was musically out of this world. I knew I had to play this music for the people."

Stollman booked a session for July 10, 1964, at Variety Arts Studio, a small and inexpensive studio near Times Square which had been used frequently by Moses Asch, the owner of Folkways Records, for whom Stollman had done legal work. Stollman recalled:

Just before 1 PM, Sunny Murray arrived, a large, genial walrus, moving and speaking with an easy agility that belied his appearance. Gary Peacock was next, tall, thin, ascetic looking, and soft spoken, with an introspective and kindly demeanor. Albert Ayler was last, small, wary and laconic.

The recording engineer left the studio door open, and Stollman and Peacock's then-wife Annette sat in the reception area. According to Stollman,

As the music played, I was enthralled, exhilarated, jubilant. I exchanged glances with Annette and said, "What an auspicious beginning for a record label!" She nodded her head in agreement.

At one point, "the engineer fled the control room for a few minutes, but returned in time to change the tape for the next selection". Stollman was "horrified" to learn that the session had been recorded in mono, though he later reflected that "In forty-plus years, no one has ever cared". The musicians were paid and signed recording agreements after the session, in a nearby cafe.

Stollman hired Jordan Matthews, formerly a producer for ABC, as his art director, and Matthews brought in Howard Bernstein to do the cover art. Stollman stated that he decided to silkscreen the cover, lending it "a primal quality". Though it was the first dedicated ESP-Disk recording, Spiritual Unity was released in 1965 as the second item in the label's catalog, following a record titled Ni Kantu En Esperanto, which Stollman described as "just an exercise" resulting from his interest in Esperanto.

Early releases of Spiritual Unity contained a booklet titled "Ayler - Peacock - Murray - You and the Night and the Music" with text by Paul Haines. The album liner notes state that the symbol "Y" that appears on the back cover "pre-dates recorded history and has always represented the rising spirit of man. We thought the sign particularly apt for this album." The booklet has never been included in any CD reissue, but it was included in the "Holy Ghost" box set.

Ayler reflected on the session that "Most people would have thought this impossible but it actually happened. The most important thing is to stay in tune with each other but it takes spiritual people to do this... We weren't playing, we were listening to each other." Following its release, Ayler sent a copy of the album to John Coltrane; soon afterwards, Coltrane urged Impulse! Records to sign Ayler. In June 1965, Coltrane recorded the album Ascension; following the recording session, Coltrane "called Ayler and told him, 'I recorded an album and found that I was playing just like you.' Albert's reply: 'No man, don't you see, you were playing like yourself. You were just feeling what I feel and were just crying out for spiritual unity."

Stollman was energized by the experience, and recalled: "I was thrilled with that record, so I was very much charged up with the idea of going forward. I wanted to explore this new music." A week following the Spiritual Unity session, Ayler, Peacock, and Murray, along with Don Cherry, John Tchicai, and Roswell Rudd, recorded New York Eye and Ear Control, which would also be released by ESP-Disk. The label would issue several additional Ayler albums, including Bells and Spirits Rejoice. According to Stollman, following Ayler's death in 1970, he represented the musician's estate.

== Critical reception ==
Professional ratings
Review scores
Source	Rating
AllMusic	5/5 stars
Penguin Guide to Jazz	4/4 stars
Pitchfork	9.3/10
The Rolling Stone Jazz Record Guide	5/5 stars

Initial critical reaction to Spiritual Unity was polarized. Scott Deveaux and Gary Giddins observed that the album "was both cheered and ridiculed" and Ayler's playing "evoked lusty hysteria". In July 1965, DownBeat magazine published an article which featured a zero-star review of the album by trumpeter Kenny Dorham, who called it "not worth the paper it takes to review it," alongside a positive review by Bill Mathieu, who wrote: "Ayler's music, as well as most avant-garde music, is, at best, difficult to listen to. It is nevertheless a very direct statement, the physical manifestation of a spiritual or mystical ritual. Its logic is the logic of human flesh in the sphere of the spirit."

Retrospectively, the album has come to be regarded as a pioneering classic of free jazz. The authors of The Penguin Guide to Jazz selected the album as part of their suggested "Core Collection," awarding it a "crown" in addition to a four-star rating, and commenting: "the 1964 Ayler trio was quintessentially a listening band, locked in a personal struggle which it is possible only to observe, awestruck, from the sidelines." In 2013, Spin included it on the "Top 100 Alternative Albums of the 1960s" list. In 2017, Pitchfork placed it at number 30 on the "200 Best Albums of the 1960s" list.

John Fordham, writing in The Guardian, commented: "Half a century since the trio unleashed this music in a tiny Times Square studio, it still blazes, uplifts and unnerves. Ayler emerges from a Sonny Rollins-like jauntiness into slurred-pitch flurries and klaxon hoots over Peacock's prodding lines and Murray's shadings on the opening 'Ghosts'; barges ferociously through seamless runs on 'The Wizard'; and calls imploringly in a tone somewhere between an impassioned singer and a microtonal viola player on the meditative 'Spirits'. It still sounds like music on the edge".

Shabaka Hutchings wrote that the first time he listened to Spiritual Unity, he "didn't understand anything!... My brain couldn't compute it." He commented: "It sounded like he was crying through the saxophone. You can hear vocalisation in Sidney Bechet and the older guys, but this was the first time I'd heard someone follow through on that and not try to mesh it with something more conventional". Eventually, he stated, "The more I listened, the more I realised that it's in what Anthony Braxton calls 'an emotional zone' – whatever Ayler does, it's about the emotional intent behind it. I wanted to see whether I could get into that space where you're free to do that. It's all about the big picture – more like painting."

== Track listing ==
All tracks are written by Albert Ayler.

No.	Title	Length
1.	"Ghosts: First Variation"	5:12
2.	"The Wizard"	7:20
3.	"Spirits"	6:46
4.	"Ghosts: Second Variation"	10:01
Total length:		29:13

2014 reissue edition bonus track
No.	Title	Length
5.	"Vibrations"	7:49
Total length:		37:17

== Personnel ==
Credits adapted from liner notes.

- Albert Ayler – tenor saxophone
- Gary Peacock – double bass
- Sunny Murray – percussion
