= Donald Ayler =

American jazz trumpeter (1942–2007)

Donald Ayler (October 5, 1942 – October 21, 2007) was an American jazz trumpeter. He was best known for his participation in concerts and recordings by groups led by his older brother, saxophonist Albert Ayler. An obituary in The Wire praised his "buzzing, declamatory trumpet playing, which was part Holy Roller primitive, part avant garde firebrand".

== Biography ==
Ayler was born in Cleveland Heights, Ohio, United States, and grew up in Shaker Heights, graduating from John Adams High School. He started out playing alto saxophone; however, according to Val Wilmer, he "became frustrated when he could not achieve the mobility and sound that had come so easily to his brother. At one point he even put a tenor reed into his alto in an attempt to 'sound like Coltrane'." At the urging of his brother, who was in the process of establishing himself musically, and who was about to leave for a European tour, he switched to trumpet, and began practicing up to nine hours a day, working with his friend and distant relative Charles Tyler, and attending the Cleveland Institute of Music.

When Albert returned to the United States, he formed a new band, which included both his brother and Charles Tyler, along with bassist Lewis Worrell and drummer Sunny Murray. Donald went on to tour and record with the group from 1965-1968, participating in the recording of Bells, Spirits Rejoice, Albert Ayler in Greenwich Village, Love Cry, and several other albums, and also worked with Paul Bley and Elvin Jones. Val Wilmer described the band's sound: "Don Ayler's skittery, up-tempo streaking, [Albert] Ayler's nagging at an idea like a dog worrying a bone, Murray's shivering cymbal-work and the banshee wail he kept up throughout the performance. The intense, braying ensembles and raggedy bugle-calls and marches - the younger Ayler's idea... became standard practice for any ensemble of the period that considered itself hip. To Ayler... the musicians were playing in a 'spiritual dimension'." In a 1966 interview with Nat Hentoff, when asked how he would advise people to listen to their music, Donald stated the following: "One way not to [listen to it] is to focus on the notes and stuff like that. Instead, try to move your imagination toward the sound. It's a matter of following the sound... Follow the sound, the pitches, the colours. You have to watch them move." Other notable performances included a concert with John Coltrane at Lincoln Center on February 19, 1966, featuring an expanded group that included Albert and Donald, Pharoah Sanders, Carlos Ward, Alice Coltrane, Jimmy Garrison, Rashied Ali, and J. C. Moses.

Following Coltrane's death on July 17, 1967, the Ayler quartet, now featuring the Ayler brothers plus bassist Richard Davis and drummer Milford Graves, played at his funeral on July 21. They performed three pieces including Donald's Our Prayer. Val Wilmer stated that, at the funeral service, "Donald Ayler stood on a balcony beside his saxophonist brother and played a spine-chilling lament. Wildly flagging his trumpet valves and swaying backwards and forwards, he seemed to scream through the instrument." A recording of this performance was released in 2004 on the compilation Holy Ghost.

By the late 1960s, Donald began to exhibit signs of mental instability, and had what he called a "nervous breakdown," for which Albert apparently blamed himself. In 1968, he departed the band, as "Albert's record company was grooming him for the rock market and did not want Donald." Donald managed to start a new band, and in 1969, Albert joined them onstage for a concert. (The Holy Ghost compilation includes recordings of two previously unreleased Donald Ayler compositions, "Prophet John" and "Judge Ye Not", from this concert, which also featured saxophonist Sam Rivers.) However, in late 1970 Albert was found dead in New York, devastating his brother. Donald returned to Cleveland, and did not play music for nearly three years.

By the late 1970s, with the help and encouragement of saxophonists Mustafa Abdul Rahim and Al Rollins (who ran a barbershop), Ayler began to play again. In 1981, he performed in Florence, Italy and recorded a three-volume album that also featured Rahim and saxophonist Frank Doblekar. However, "he was unable to sustain a career", and spent much of his remaining life in assisted living or nursing home facilities. He appeared in the 2005 documentary film My Name Is Albert Ayler, where he talked about his and Albert's life, their music and their relationship, and also appeared in archival footage from various years.

Ayler suffered a heart attack on October 21, 2007, and died at Northcoast Behavioral Healthcare in Northfield, Ohio. He was survived by his father, and was buried next to his mother in Highland Park Cemetery in Highland Hills, Ohio.

== Discography ==
As a leader

- In Florence 1981 - Vol. 1 (Frame, 1981)
- In Florence 1981 - Vol. 2 (Frame, 1981)
- In Florence 1981 - Vol. 3 (Frame, 1981)

With Albert Ayler

- Bells (ESP-Disk, 1965)
- Spirits Rejoice (ESP-Disk, 1965)
- Lörrach / Paris 1966 (hat Musics, 1966 [1982])
- The New Wave in Jazz (on one track; Impulse!, 1966)
- Albert Ayler in Greenwich Village (Impulse!, 1967)
- Love Cry (Impulse!, 1968)
- The Village Concerts (Impulse!, 1980)
- At Slug's Saloon, Vol. 1 (Base Record, 1982)
- At Slug's Saloon, Vol. 2 (Base Record, 1982)
- Holy Ghost: Rare & Unissued Recordings (1962–70) (Revenant, 2004)
- Stockholm, Berlin 1966 (hatOLOGY, 2011)
- La Cave Live, Cleveland 1966 Revisited (ezz-thetics, 2022)
