= The Cricket (magazine) =

US music magazine

The Cricket: Black Music in Evolution
- Editor: Amiri Baraka (then LeRoi Jones), Larry Neal, and A. B. Spellman
- Categories: Music magazine
- Founded: 1968
- Final issue: 1969
- Company: Drum Publications Ltd
- Country: United States
- Based in: New York City
- Language: English
- Website: The Cricket

The Cricket, subtitled "Black Music in Evolution", was a magazine created in 1968 by Amiri Baraka (then known as LeRoi Jones), Larry Neal and A. B. Spellman. Baraka has said: "Larry Neal, AB and I realized the historical influence of music on African /Afro American Culture. I saw the magazine as a necessary dispenser of this influence as part of a continuum. And that attention to the culture was a way of drawing attention to the people's needs and struggle." The headquarters was in New York City.

Four issues of The Cricket were published from 1968 to 1969. Contributors included Sonia Sanchez, Don L. Lee, Milford Graves, Oliver Nelson, Sun Ra, Stanley Crouch, Askia Muhammad Touré, Albert Ayler, Willie Kgositsile, Ishmael Reed, and many others.
