= Illuminators (album) =

Live album by Sunny Murray
- Released: 1996
- Venue: The Knitting Factory, New York City
- Genre: Free jazz
- Label: Audible Hiss; 008

Sunny Murray chronology
Illumination (1995)	Illuminators (1996)	Homework (1997)

Illuminators is a live album by drummer Sunny Murray. It was recorded at The Knitting Factory in New York City and was released in 1996 by Audible Hiss. On the album, Murray is joined by saxophonist and pianist Charles Gayle.

== Reception ==
Professional ratings
Review scores
Source	Rating
AllMusic	3/5 stars
The Penguin Guide to Jazz	3.5/4 stars

In a review for AllMusic, Rob Ferrier wrote: "Sunny Murray and Charles Gayle... here engage in an intense musical discussion... While the mood can only be described as tense, these musicians pay careful attention to each other, not arguing so much as conversing. This music is dense but never crowded, and never ever directionless... Not many instrumentalists could keep up with Murray's volcano. In Gayle, Murray has found a voice to rival the visceral power he once grappled with in Ayler's band. To both musicians' credit, each seems content to flex their muscle rather than knock the listener about the head and shoulders with it."

The authors of the Penguin Guide to Jazz Recordings awarded the album 3½ stars, and commented: "The duo with Gayle was to provide some of the most ferociously beautiful live moments of the '90s. Inevitably, it transfers to record only with an overall loss of drive, but these five pieces... are as clear a representation of his art as one could hope for.... Murray still cleaves to a dark, punchy groove, the percussion equivalent of what Cecil Taylor was doing, but with more song in it."

== Track listing ==
Track timings not provided.

1. "Truth Queen" (Murray)
2. "Spiritual Grace" (Gayle)
3. "Ascentual Spirit" (Murray)
4. "Don't Touch This" (Murray)
5. "Blast From The Past" (Murray)

== Personnel ==
- Sunny Murray – percussion
- Charles Gayle – tenor saxophone, piano
