= Live at Moers Festival =

Live album by Sunny Murray
- Released: 1979
- Recorded: June 3, 1979
- Venue: Moers Festival, Moers, Germany
- Genre: Free jazz
- Length: 48:18
- Label: Moers Music; Momu 01054
- Producer: Burkhard Hennen

Sunny Murray chronology
Apple Cores (1978)	Live at Moers Festival (1979)	Aigu-Grave (1980)

Live at Moers Festival is a live album by drummer Sunny Murray. It was recorded in June 1979 at the Moers Festival in Moers, Germany, and was released later that year by Moers Music. On the album, Murray is joined by saxophonist and bass clarinetist David Murray, and bassist Malachi Favors, and percussionist Cheikh Tidiane Fall.

== Reception ==
Professional ratings
Review scores
Source	Rating
AllMusic	3/5 stars
The Penguin Guide to Jazz	3.5/4 stars
The Virgin Encyclopedia of Jazz	3/4 stars

The editors of AllMusic awarded the album 3 stars.

The authors of the Penguin Guide to Jazz Recordings awarded the album 3½ stars, and wrote: "The leader's playing... remains utterly distinctive, using a simple kit to create waves of rhythm and colour, dispersing marked time and controlling without dominating all the different areas of the music. David Murray is at something near his early, blistering best and, while the music is more a jam session than a charted course, the four themes provide enough material for the group to roister along. The in-concert sound is no more than acceptable, but the excitement survives any fidelity problems."

== Track listing ==
All compositions by Sunny Murray.

1. "Sweet Lovely" – 9:27
2. "German Dilemma" – 15:01
3. "Tree Tops" – 8:15
4. "Happiness Tears" – 14:00

== Personnel ==
- Sunny Murray – drums
- David Murray – tenor saxophone, bass clarinet
- Malachi Favors – double bass, percussion
- Cheikh Tidiane Fall – congas
- Recorded on June 3, 1979, at the Moers Festival in Moers, Germany.
