= Sonny's Time Now =

Studio album by Sunny Murray
- Released: 1965
- Recorded: November 17, 1965
- Studio: New York City
- Genre: Free jazz
- Length: 36:07
- Label: Jihad

Sunny Murray chronology
Sonny's Time Now (1965)	Sunny Murray (1966)

Sonny's Time Now is an album by American free jazz drummer Sunny Murray, his first as a leader. It was recorded in New York City on November 17, 1965 and first released on LeRoi Jones' Jihad label. It was later reissued on the DIW and Skokiaan labels.

The album features Albert Ayler and Don Cherry, with whom Murray had recorded and toured during the previous year, along with two bassists, Henry Grimes and Lewis Worrell. (Sonny's Time Now is one of the few recordings on which Ayler appears as a guest artist.) The track titled "Black Art" features Jones reading his poem of the same name, backed by the musicians. ("Black Art" is one of Baraka's most controversial poems, and it "became a central icon of the Black Arts Movement, and at the same time, it also became a favorite target of those critics who regarded the black aesthetic as an anti-aesthetic.") According to Jeff Schwartz, bassist, Ayler biographer, and author of "Free Jazz: A Research and Information Guide", Jones financed the recording, with Murray's choice of performers.

The Jihad label released only three recordings: Black & Beautiful, which featured Jones reading poetry backed by Yusef Iman, his wife, and a Doo-wop group; A Black Mass, a play written by Jones about a mad scientist, with music by Sun Ra's Myth Science Arkestra; and Sonny's Time Now.

When asked if he had been composing since leaving Cecil Taylor's band in 1964, Murray recalled: "After I left Cecil I didn't have much choice, because nobody was giving me a job. So I did a small job. Cecil came to it, and I played all of Max Roach's pieces. They were correct, and then I wrote some music, and I asked my children did they like it. They said, 'Yeah, Dad.' So I found out I could write. My first record, Sonny's Time Now, they're all my pieces: 'Virtue,' 'The Lie,' 'Justice.' It's a strange record because Albert and Don [Cherry] are playing like this [makes screeching sound]."

== Reception ==
Professional ratings
Review scores
Source	Rating
Allmusic	3/5 stars
DownBeat	4/5 stars

Writing for AllMusic, Brandon Burke stated: "Were it not for Murray's name on the cover, Sonny's Time Now could probably be misinterpreted as an Albert Ayler record... this is a much more fractured affair than most Ayler records of the time... one is presented with some exceptionally free music that doesn't appear, on the surface anyway, to be based on any predetermined structures... This is some very serious music by some very serious cats."

In his book The Freedom Principle, John Litweiler wrote: "Trumpet and tenor improvise in opposition to the grim Murray tides, and the two rumbling basses in 'Virtue', and an intense LeRoi Jones poem... answered by the flutter of drums and the tempoless, free-form quintet. Ayler does not dominate this recording... and he opens up in the 'Justice' collective improvisations, responding to Cherry's longer lines with snapping and snarling."

Thurston Moore included Sonny's Time Now in his "Top Ten From The Free Jazz Underground" list, first published in 1995 in the second issue of the defunct Grand Royal magazine. Moore wrote: "This recording is super-lo-fi and is awesome... This music is very Ayler but more fractured and odd."

In the album liner notes, Jones wrote: "At last Sonny Murray, the mythical red-black man from Oklahoma, has an album of his own. Where he is given his long overdue." Regarding Murray's outlook, Jones stated: "He is so purely and absolutely committed to making music, to thinking about, living within his music. 'Freedom,' Sonny has always said. 'Free,' about this music, about his playing. 'I'm trying to play the music, like I feel it. Free'... Sonny makes it about energy and strength. These are keys to his method and style. Freedom, energy, and strength. 'To play strong, forever,' is the holy man's wish. It is Sonny Murray's wish." Concerning the album, Jones wrote: "Listen to the Cherry-Ayler duets... They make you slide around chortling. Don, instinctively placing his bullet-like metallic against wild Albert, getting in, getting in, describing the other space. When Albert might make you think there is no more space. But it's freedom. You can go any where, you can." Grimes and Worrell "make a droning getup sound, behind and on top of everybody, that 'collects' the music and drives it at the same time." He concludes: "This is deep music... It goes all through you, makes the circle of excitement and adventure, from earth to heaven, man in between going both ways, elliptical and perfect as anything. Get to this music, if you can. Get to it, and it will, in turn, get to you."

== Track listing ==
All musical compositions by Sunny Murray. The poem "Black Art" is by LeRoi Jones.

1. "Virtue" - 11:07
2. "Justice" - 12:43 (originally released in two parts)
3. "Black Art" - 06:33
4. "The Lie" - 05:44 (not included in original release)

== Personnel ==
- Albert Ayler - tenor saxophone
- Don Cherry - cornet
- Henry Grimes - bass
- Lewis Worrell - bass
- Sunny Murray - drums
- Leroi Jones - voice on "Black Art"
