= John Carisi =

American trumpeter and composer (1922–1992)

- Born: John E. Carisi; February 23, 1922; Hasbrouck Heights, New Jersey, U.S.
- Died: October 3, 1992 (aged 70) New York, New York
- Genre: Jazz
- Occupations: Musician; composer; arranger
- Instrument: Trumpet
- Years active: 1938–1992
- Labels: Impulse!; ABC-Paramount, Verve; Columbia

John E. Carisi (February 23, 1922 – October 3, 1992) was an American trumpeter and composer.

== Early life and career ==
Carisi was born in Hasbrouck Heights, New Jersey on February 22, 1922, the youngest of three children born to John G. and Philomena Carisi. Raised in Jamaica, Queens, Carisi attended Jamaica High School, where he taught himself trumpet while playing in dance bands in 1937.

Early in his career, Carisi was a member of Herbie Fields's Orchestra (1938–1943) and Glenn Miller's Army Air Force Band. After the war he worked with Ray McKinley, Claude Thornhill, Charlie Barnet, Urbie Green, and Benny Goodman, among others and studied with acclaimed composer Stefan Wolpe.

His minor-blues composition "Israel" was quickly recognized as a unique jazz classic, after it was recorded by Miles Davis at the sessions which later became known as the Birth of the Cool. Other notable versions have been recorded by Bill Evans, and the Gerry Mulligan Concert Jazz Band. Another well known Carisi piece, "Springsville", was recorded by Miles Davis, as arranged by Gil Evans on the album Miles Ahead.

In 1957, he arranged the music for Urbie Green's album, All About Urbie Green. He shared an album with Cecil Taylor that was released as Into the Hot under Gil Evans' name for Impulse! in 1961, and arranged Marvin Stamm's 1968 album Machinations.

Carisi also taught, at Queens College and later at Manhattan School of Music.

On October 3, 1992, at the age of 70, Carisi died in New York as a result of complications stemming from open heart surgery undergone in February of that year.

== Selected discography ==
- Urbie Green: All About Urbie Green and His Big Band (ABC-Paramount, 1956)
- Miles Davis & Gil Evans Orchestra: Miles Ahead (Columbia, 1957)
- Gil Evans: Gil Evans & Ten (Prestige, 1957)
- John Carisi: The New Jazz Sound of Showboat (Columbia, 1960)
- Gil Evans: Into the Hot (Impulse! Records; 1961)
- Marvin Stamm: Machinations (Verve, 1968)
- John Carisi, Eddie Sauter, Christian Wolff, Stefan Wolpe: Counterpoise (hat(now)ART; 2000)

== Literature ==
- Hentoff, Nat: Liner Notes to Into The Hot (Impulse!, 1961)
- Morton, Richard & Cook, Brian: The Penguin Guide To Jazz on CD, Second Edition, 1994 & Sixth Edition, London, Penguin, 2002 ISBN 0-14-051521-6
