= Sunny Murray (album) =

Studio album by Sunny Murray
- Released: 1966
- Recorded: January 1966
- Studio: New York City
- Genre: Free jazz
- Length: 41:01
- Label: ESP-Disk 1032

Sunny Murray chronology
Sonny's Time Now (1965)	Sunny Murray (1966)	Sunshine (1969)

Sunny Murray, also known as Sunny Murray Quintet, is an album by American free jazz drummer Sunny Murray, his second as a leader. It was recorded in New York City in January, 1966, and released on the ESP-Disk label. The album features Murray on drums along with alto saxophonists Byard Lancaster and Jack Graham, trumpeter Jacques Coursil, and bassist Alan Silva. A remastered version, which includes an interview between Murray and ESP founder Bernard Stollman, was issued by ESP-Disk in 2007.

According to Murray, he used a thirty-six-inch bass drum on the album "because there's something about that instrument that homogenizes the group." Murray recalled that he met Coursil at a restaurant after saxophonist Clarence Sharpe recommended that he speak with the dishwasher: "There's a cat works in the kitchen. He's pretty good, Murray. You ought to check him out."

Following the release of the album, Murray was awarded DownBeat magazine's "New Star" award in the drum category. When he learned that the award did not involve a cash component, Murray went to DownBeat offices and "revolted": "I took some paper from the secretary's trash can, and I made a bonfire on the floor and I started to burn my Downbeat award. The secretary called the police. There was smoke everywhere, and Don [DeMichael, Editor] came out of the office throwing water on the fire..."

== Reception ==
Professional ratings
Review scores
Source	Rating
AllMusic	4.5/5 stars
The Penguin Guide to Jazz	3/4 stars

In a review for AllMusic, Scott Yanow awarded Sunny Murray 4.5 stars, and wrote: "the band is fairly coherent but also full of fire and chance-taking solos. In ways, this is a typical ESP free-form blowing session, and certainly will be most enjoyed by open-eared listeners." The authors of The Penguin Guide to Jazz awarded the album 3 stars, calling it Murray's "real coming-out as a leader" and "pretty uncompromising fare." Writing for All About Jazz, Jerry D'Souza commented: "The music is intense, but it is also passionate... [it] ferments, roils, and fascinates."

== Track listing ==
Tracks 1, 2, and 4 by Sunny Murray. Track 3 by Jacques Coursil.

1. "Phase 1,2,3,4" – 9:45
2. "Hilariously" – 11:12
3. "Angels And Devils" – 11:09
4. "Giblet" – 8:55

== Personnel ==
- Byard Lancaster – alto saxophone
- Jack Graham – alto saxophone
- Jacques Coursil – trumpet
- Alan Silva – bass
- Sunny Murray – drums

== Production ==
- David Hancock – engineer
- Ray Gibson – cover photo
- J. Dillon – art director
