= Swing Low Sweet Spiritual =

Studio album by Albert Ayler
- Released: 1981
- Recorded: February 24, 1964 at Atlantic Studios, New York City
- Genre: Free jazz
- Length: 45:26 Goin'Home with bonus tracks
- Label: Osmosis (Denmark) 4001; Black Lion BLCD 760197
- Producer: Robert Altshuler and Jørgen Frigaard

Albert Ayler chronology
Spirits (1964)	Swing Low Sweet Spiritual (1981)	Prophecy (1964)

Goin'Home Cover

Swing Low Sweet Spiritual is an album by American free jazz saxophonist Albert Ayler recorded in New York City at the same session that produced Spirits in 1964 and intended for release on the Danish Debut label but first released in 1981 on the Dutch Osmosis label then re-released on CD with bonus tracks on the Black Lion label as Goin' Home.

== Reception ==
Professional ratings
Review scores
Source	Rating
Allmusic	3/5 stars
The Rolling Stone Jazz Record Guide	2/5 stars

The Allmusic review by Scott Yanow stated: "Ayler works well with his backup group (pianist Call Cobbs, bassist Henry Grimes, and drummer Sunny Murray) and creates very emotional music (really hanging onto the themes)". Al Campbell commented: "These traditional compositions are treated with reverence and a lack of improvisation, played in a quietly passionate but respectful manner. They reveal a sensitivity that was obscured with the emotionally charged tenor screeching of the Ayler originals that were also recorded at this session".

== Track listing ==
1. "Goin' Home" (Antonín Dvořák) - 4:26
2. "Ol' Man River" [take 2] (Oscar Hammerstein II, Jerome Kern) - 5:25
3. "Down by the Riverside" [take 6] (Traditional) - 4:39
4. "Swing Low, Sweet Chariot" [take 3] (Traditional) - 4:30
5. "Deep River" (Traditional) - 4:15
6. "When the Saints Go Marching In" (Traditional) - 4:12
7. "Nobody Knows the Trouble I've Seen" (Traditional) - 4:44
8. "Ol' Man River" [take 1] (Hammerstein, Kern) - 3:58 Additional track on Goin Home CD release
9. "Swing Low, Sweet Chariot" [take 1] (Traditional) - 4:49
10. "Down by the Riverside" [take 5] (Traditional) - 4:28

== Personnel ==
- Albert Ayler - tenor saxophone, soprano saxophone
- Call Cobbs - piano
- Henry Grimes - bass (tracks 2–10)
- Sunny Murray - drums (tracks 2–10)
