= Slugs' Saloon =

Jazz club in New York City

Coordinates: 40.7220°N 73.9815°W

Slugs' Saloon was a jazz club at 242 East 3rd Street, between Avenue B and C in Manhattan's East Village, operating from the mid-1960s to 1972.

The location, in what was then a run-down part of New York City, first hosted a Ukrainian restaurant and bar, and later a bar that served as a meeting point for drug dealers. In 1964, Robert Schoenholt and Jerry Schultz opened it as a club and initially called it "Slugs' Saloon", the "slugs" being a reference to the "three-centered beings" and "terrestrial three-brained beings" mentioned in the book Beelzebub's Tales to His Grandson by George Gurdjieff. Due to New York City regulations, the word "saloon" had to be dropped from the name. The venue was called "Slugs' in the Far East", due to its easterly location in the East Village. The interior of the club was longer than it was wide and the bandstand all the way in the back. It could fit 75 people but often held twice that. The bar was on the left side as one entered the venue. The wooden sign that hung outside the venue was carved by James Jackson.

Sun Ra and His Astro-Infinity Music at Slugs' in the Far East

During the mid-1960s it slowly started attracting regular jazz performances, developing a reputation as a musician's bar. In this period it became closely associated with free-jazz musician Sun Ra: from March 1966 through late 1967, Sun Ra and his Arkestra (billed as "Sun Ra and His Astro-Infinity Music") played regular gigs every Monday, and continued to play the venue irregularly thereafter.

By the late 1960s the club had grown a vibrant scene in its out-of-the-way location, with performances from prominent jazz musicians including Sonny Rollins, Albert Ayler and Ornette Coleman, among many others. Some of these performances were recorded, often surreptitiously, and appear on officially released or on bootleg albums. Audiences included a number of well-known artists and musicians, ranging from Larry Rivers to Paul H. Brown to Bob Thompson and Salvador Dalí. The venue saw the death of Lee Morgan on February 19, 1972, when he was shot at the bar by his common-law wife Helen Moore. The general demise of the neighborhood and his hard lifestyle as a club owner led Jerry Schulz to leave, and the club shut down in late 1972.
