= Into the Hot (Gil Evans album) =

Studio album by Gil Evans
- Released: January 1962
- Recorded: September 14, October 6, 10 & 31, 1961
- Studio: Van Gelder Studio, Englewood Cliffs, NJ
- Genre: Jazz
- Length: 41:30
- Label: Impulse! A-9
- Producer: Creed Taylor

Gil Evans chronology
Out of the Cool (1961)	Into the Hot (1962)	The Individualism of Gil Evans (1964)

Cecil Taylor chronology
New York City R&B (1961)	Into the Hot (1962)	Nefertiti, the Beautiful One Has Come (1962)

Into the Hot is an album released under the auspices of Gil Evans featuring a large ensemble under the direction of John Carisi and the Cecil Taylor Unit. The album was released on the Impulse! label in 1962.

Composer/trumpeter John Carisi's three tracks are performed by an orchestra drawn from the top ranks of New York jazz and studio musicians and features solos by Phil Woods.

Cecil Taylor's contribution consists of two tracks by Taylor and a quintet with Archie Shepp, Jimmy Lyons, Henry Grimes and Sunny Murray. The group expanded to a septet with the addition of Ted Curson and Roswell Rudd on a third track.

The Cecil Taylor recordings from this album were also released on Mixed in 1998, along with tracks by Roswell Rudd's sextet, as well as on The Dedication Series Vol. III: The New Breed (1978).

== Background ==
Evans had recorded his previous album, Out of the Cool, for Impulse! in late 1960. Despite the fact that it received excellent reviews, Evans decided to back out of his contract with the label, as he wasn't sure he had enough material for a new album, and had also decided to leave Impulse! for Verve, following producer Creed Taylor. Evans then handed over his remaining Impulse! session dates to Johnny Carisi and Cecil Taylor, each of whom produced enough material for one side of an LP. Impulse! released the new album, Into the Hot, with Evans' photo on the cover, which was visually similar to that of Out of the Cool, and the music attributed to "The Gil Evans Orchestra". However, according to Evans biographer Stephanie Stein Crease, the album "was not at all a Gil Evans album. Gil did not perform on it, nor did his orchestra, nor was there any of his music on it. When asked why he chose Carisi and Taylor for this windfall, Evans, who'd admired their work as composers, said that was the only way he could hear their music."

Carisi recalled: Evans "got ahold of Cecil Taylor and me... He got his own group, I got up my own group, and Gil acted as an A&R man. He sat there in the booth, and asked for certain things to be played over again... he didn't write one note. If you read the liner notes, you see that everything was done by other people." Similarly, Creed Taylor reflected: "We just kind of wound up with that Into the Hot thing... I just don't look back. I was there and that was that."

== Reception ==
Professional ratings
Review scores
Source	Rating
Down Beat	4.5/5 stars
AllMusic	3/5 stars
The Penguin Guide to Jazz	3/4 stars

In a review for AllMusic, Scott Yanow described Carisi's contributions to the album as "disappointingly forgettable", but called Taylor's music "quite adventurous and exciting, the main reason to acquire this somewhat misleading set." Mark Corroto, writing for All About Jazz, commented: "Evans' release introduced many listeners to Taylor and the revolutionary artists Jimmy Lyons, Archie Shepp, Roswell Rudd, Henry Grimes, and Sunny Murray. The music... is, for lack of a better term, swingin.' Lyons and Shepp's saxophones address the growing storm whipped up by Ornette Coleman while the pulse of the music threatens to tear itself away from the bebop revolution. Revisiting this skillfully remastered music sixty years on might not give us that original 'shock of the new' experience, but it remains quite surprising. Taylor orchestrates not unlike Charles Mingus as a means to proffer his growing confidence in his keyboard language."

In an interview, pianist Alexander Hawkins remarked on Taylor's contribution to the album: "it's absolutely gripping; and more than all of his other albums, it's a Rosetta Stone for understanding where he came from, and what was to come, and how he fits into contemporary music generally – not just jazz. It's got the characteristic of a manifesto. I can't think of anything like it! It somehow shows directions he didn't take, which makes it even more rewarding and inspirational. He's so quixotic that you can't say his entire language was mapped out – but there's a lot here... It grabbed me from the start. I'm a complete Ellington junkie, so I understood this record immediately – if not fully, then intuitively. It's so Ellingtonian in concept as far as composition goes. Plus, there are definitely pianistic precedents in there – not just Ellington, but Tatum, Powell and Monk."

Pierre Giroux, writing for MusicWeb International, remarked: "John Carisi... was a self-taught trumpeter of little note, with one exception. He penned the composition 'Israel' which Miles Davis recorded as part of his Birth Of The Cool album and also for which Bill Evans had a particular affinity. None of Carisi's compositions written for this session... come even remotely close to the quality of that previously mentioned piece, even though he tries to emulate some of the touches and flourishes that Evans produced with such luminescent ease. Cecil Taylor's efforts are purely in the 'avant-garde' style and are not for the faint of heart. While the quality of the musicianship is undoubted and the execution is assertive, it is well beyond anything Evans would have imagined."

In a review for Jazz History Online, Amy Duncan wrote: "Following his 1961 big band masterpiece, Out of the Cool, one might expect Gil Evans' next album to be a further development of the same theme, but that's not what happened. Instead, Into the Hot gave exposure to two other musician/composers, trumpeter John Carisi and pianist Cecil Taylor. According to one of the participants, Evans' only role was go out and get the sandwiches at lunchtime... Overall, Into the Hot isn't everyone’s cup of tea, but it's an excellent showcase for two of jazz's outstanding figures."

== Track listing ==
1. "Moon Taj" (John Carisi) - 8:25
2. "Pots" (Cecil Taylor) - 5:50
3. "Angkor Wat" (Carisi) - 6:24
4. "Bulbs" (Taylor) - 6:55
5. "Barry's Tune" (Carisi) - 3:43
6. "Mixed" (Taylor) - 10:13

Recorded September 14 (track 3), October 6 (track 5), October 10 (tracks 2, 4, & 6) & October 31 (track 1), 1961

== Personnel ==
All sessions were supervised and conducted by Gil Evans.

The John Carisi Orchestra: tracks 1, 3, & 5

- John Carisi: trumpet, arranger
- John Glasel: trumpet
- Joe Wilder: trumpet (track 1), Doc Severinsen: trumpet (track 3), Clark Terry: trumpet (track 5)
- Urbie Green: trombone
- Bob Brookmeyer: valve trombone (tracks 1 & 5)
- Jim Buffington: french horn (track 3)
- Harvey Phillips: tuba
- Phil Woods: alto saxophone (solo)
- Gene Quill: alto saxophone, clarinet
- Eddie Costa: piano, vibes
- Barry Galbraith: guitar
- Art Davis: bass (tracks 1 & 5), Milt Hinton: bass (track 3)
- Osie Johnson: drums

The Cecil Taylor Unit; tracks 2, 4, & 6

- Cecil Taylor: piano
- Jimmy Lyons: alto saxophone
- Archie Shepp: tenor saxophone
- Henry Grimes: bass
- Sunny Murray: drums
- Ted Curson: trumpet (added on track 6)
- Roswell Rudd: trombone (added on track 6)
