= Spirits Rejoice =

Live album by Albert Ayler
- Released: 1965
- Recorded: September 23, 1965 at Judson Hall, NYC
- Genre: Free jazz
- Length: 32:58
- Label: ESP-Disk ESP 1020

Albert Ayler chronology
Bells (1965)	Spirits Rejoice (1965)	Live at Slug's Saloon (1966)

Spirits Rejoice is a live album by American free jazz saxophonist Albert Ayler recorded in New York City in 1965 and first released on the ESP-Disk label. The recording session took place without an audience at Judson Hall, which had been rented solely for recording purposes.

The album marks bassist Gary Peacock's last appearance with Ayler.

Regarding the two-minute track titled "Holy Family", ESP founder Bernard Stollman recalled:

As Albert was recording his session at Judson Hall, I asked him whether he would be willing to do a short work. He smiled resignedly and nodded in agreement. One of the songs on Spirits Rejoice, "Holy Family," is the result. It is less than three minutes in length. I realized, to my chagrin, that I had violated our commitment to recognize the artist as the sole authority to determine the content of his work, and I vowed to myself that it would never happen again.

== Reception ==
Professional ratings
Review scores
Source	Rating
Allmusic	4.5/5 stars
DownBeat	3.5/5 stars
The Rolling Stone Jazz Record Guide	5/5 stars
The Penguin Guide to Jazz Recordings	3/4 stars

The Allmusic review by Steve Huey awarded the album 4½ stars, calling it "one of Albert Ayler's wildest, noisiest albums", and stating: "For all its apparent chaos, Spirits Rejoice is often surprisingly pre-arranged – witness all the careening harmony passages that accompany the theme statements, and the seamless transitions of the title track. Spirits Rejoice is proof that there was an underlying logic even to Ayler's most extreme moments, and that's why it remains a tremendously inspiring recording". Writing for All About Jazz, Mark Corroto commented: "When this music was first heard, it angered many 'experts' who couldn't connect the dots between New Orleans and European military bands, spirituals and the naive nature of Ayler's art... The title track borrows from 'La Marseillaise,' accelerating from zero to sixty... The music has a revival feel with 'Holy Family,' a catch me if you can tone, 'D.C.' and 'Prophet,' and the medieval churchiness of 'Angels'... It is well worth the effort to listen to this music for the first time, literally and, well, figuratively."

Ayler biographer Jeff Schwartz called the title track "a long march medley... with harmonies for the three horns and a clearly determined order of themes," and praised "D. C." and "Prophet", noting: "While there is chaotic group improvisation on these tunes, the band also shows incredible tightness by staying perfectly together as they accelerate the composed parts of these pieces." Schwartz also stated: "Peacock and Grimes collaborate brilliantly throughout this program... On 'D.C.,' the communication between the two of them becomes so tense that the performance is brought from its loud, fast, dense beginning to complete silence during their solos. Albert was never satisfied with any of his bassists after Peacock and, in his music from here on, began to use strings in different ways, with more pre-arranged roles and composed parts, depending on which players he could get."

Writing for DownBeat magazine, Harvey Pekar commented on Ayler's playing: "he hurls himself violently into almost everything he plays, seldom improvising with restraint for very long. His work is often extremely violent. Speed is a very important element of his playing. He sometimes plays so fast that the notes in his phrases nearly seem to lose their identities; it's almost as if these extremely complex lines were not composed of individual notes but were ascending and descending unbroken ribbons of sounds... His playing derives its interest from its speed and from its author's use of varied textures and colors and freak effects, i.e., rasped and honked tones and high notes that are above the normal upper register of the tenor saxophone. When he plays fast, his tone is extremely dry and cuts like a knife." He concluded: "There are better Ayler albums available, but anything he does now is worth having."

In a review for Hit Parader magazine, Patti Smith wrote: "any ayler lp is worth it. he created his own space. you enter into this space - it's a separate universe. you don't get one phone call. you're immediately cut off. you feel a slow cellular ache shorting through your navel... you're out to sea. out to lunch. out on a limb w/albert ayler. a tree felled in a forest so dense there's no room to fall no place to go so you stay cut off and standing... and rotting... any albert ayler record is great when you want to circulate w/ yourself. his sweet chaos. pushes and rushes. cool air permeating ravaged nostrils... sound? take the manic snorts of captain liberty. dissonant chalk. the next moment as melodic as sharp yet slick metal teeth..."

== Legacy ==
Canadian artist Stan Douglas, in collaboration with George E. Lewis, created the video installation Hors-champs in 1992. The installation features Lewis in an improvisation of Ayler's "Spirits Rejoice" with musicians Douglas Ewart, Kent Carter and Oliver Johnson. The installation was featured at documenta 9 in Kassel, Germany.

The title track is featured as the main theme at the end of the 2023 film Passages, directed by Ira Sachs.

== Track listing ==
All compositions by Albert Ayler

1. "Spirits Rejoice" - 11:41
2. "Holy Family" - 2:11
3. "D. C." - 8:00
4. "Angels" - 5:30
5. "Prophet" - 5:36

== Personnel ==
- Albert Ayler - tenor saxophone
- Donald Ayler - trumpet (tracks 1–3 & 5)
- Charles Tyler - alto saxophone (tracks 1–3 & 5)
- Call Cobbs - harpsichord (track 4)
- Henry Grimes, Gary Peacock - bass
- Sunny Murray - drums
