= Bells (album) =

Live album by Albert Ayler
- Released: 1965
- Recorded: May 1, 1965
- Venue: The Town Hall, NYC
- Genre: Free jazz
- Length: 20:03
- Label: ESP-Disk 1010
- Producer: Richard L. Alderson

Albert Ayler chronology
The Hilversum Session (1964)	Bells (1965)	Spirits Rejoice (1965)

Bells is a live album by American free jazz saxophonist Albert Ayler recorded at The Town Hall in New York City in 1965 and first released as a single sided LP on the ESP-Disk label. The album was released in many variations including clear and coloured vinyl and with a variety of colored covers and also on CD combined with Ayler’s live Prophecy album.

== Reception ==
Professional ratings
Review scores
Source	Rating
AllMusic	3.5/5 stars
Down Beat	0/5 stars
The Rolling Stone Jazz Record Guide	4/5 stars
The Penguin Guide to Jazz	3/4 stars

A critical contemporary review in the magazine Down Beat declined to award any stars to the album.

The Allmusic review by Michael G. Nastos states: "As Albert Ayler recorded several definitive recordings before or after this one, and due to the very short length of Bells, it cannot be considered a magnum opus. But it does contain music played by his most powerful unit, a small window into the mind and heart of the most iconic maverick in the free jazz movement, and a magnet for discussion that lingers on well past his death".

The authors of The Penguin Guide to Jazz awarded the album 3 stars, stating that it was "a token that here was music so powerful you'd probably only manage 20 minutes of it before switching off the hi-fi and taking deep gulps of air."

All About Jazz commented: "Part of the lasting brilliance of Bells is that the group is much more roughshod at this early stage, the ensemble not yet formed into a cohesive, balanced whole but a rickety patchwork, its seams (and therefore process) showing proudly through".

== Track listing ==
All compositions by Albert Ayler

1. "Bells" - 20:03

== Personnel ==
- Albert Ayler - tenor saxophone
- Donald Ayler - trumpet
- Charles Tyler - alto saxophone
- Lewis Worrell - bass
- Sonny Murray - drums
