= Sunny Murray =

American jazz drummer (1936–2017)

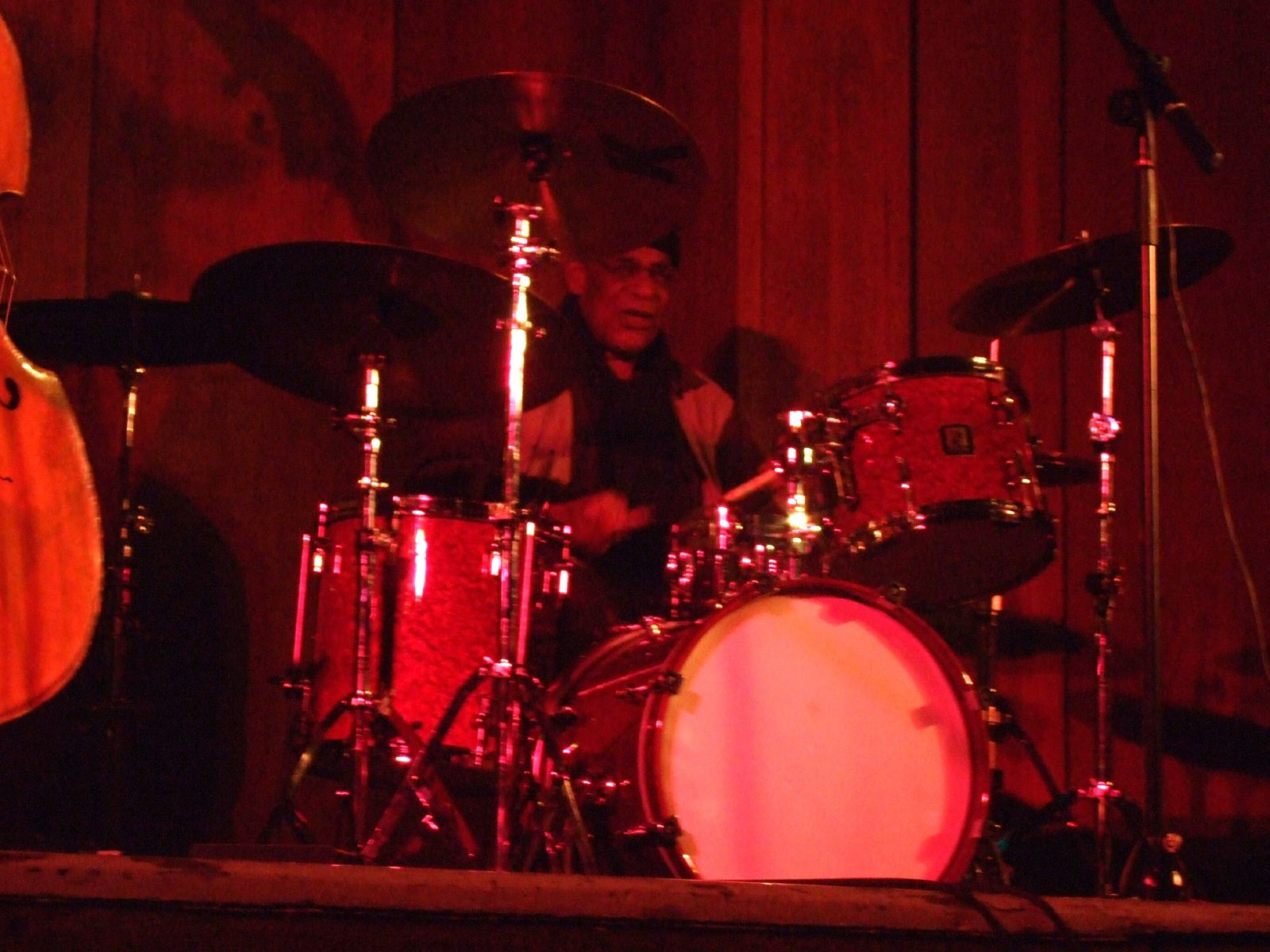

Background information
- Born: James Marcellus Arthur Murray; September 21, 1936; Idabel, Oklahoma, U.S.
- Died: December 7, 2017 (aged 81) Paris, France
- Genres: Free jazz
- Occupation: Drummer

James Marcellus Arthur "Sunny" Murray (September 21, 1936 – December 7, 2017) was an American musician, and was one of the pioneers of the free jazz style of drumming.

== Biography ==
Murray was born in Idabel, Oklahoma, where he was raised by an uncle who later died after being refused treatment at a hospital because of his race. He began playing drums at the age of nine. As a teen, he lived in a rough part of Philadelphia, and spent two years in a reformatory. In 1956, he moved to New York City, where he worked in a car wash and as a building superintendent. During this time, he played with musicians such as trumpeters Red Allen and Ted Curson, pianist Willie "The Lion" Smith, and saxophonists Rocky Boyd and Jackie McLean.

In 1959, he played for the first time with pianist Cecil Taylor and, according to Murray, "[f]or six years all the other things were wiped from my mind..." "With Cecil, I had to originate a complete new direction on drums." Murray stated: "We played for about a year, just practicing, studying — we went to workshops with Varèse, did a lot of creative things, just experimenting, without a job." In 1961, Murray made a recording with Taylor's group that was released under the auspices of Gil Evans as one side of Into the Hot.

In 1962, Murray went to Europe for the first time with Taylor and saxophonist Jimmy Lyons. (Bassist Henry Grimes was supposed to join them, but fell ill at the last moment.) During that time, the group made a stylistic breakthrough; Murray stated: "We were in Sweden and we had finally decided to be free... The way Cecil and Jimmy and I were playing, we could absorb any different thing at that period, because we were so fresh!" While in Denmark later that year, the trio recorded the influential concerts released as Nefertiti the Beautiful One Has Come.

That same year, while in Sweden with Taylor, Murray met saxophonist Albert Ayler. (According to Murray, after hearing Taylor's group perform, Ayler approached them and said "I've been waiting for you, man. You're the guys I've been waiting for." He also recalled that Taylor "jumped half out of his chair" the first time Ayler played with the group.) With Ayler, the group recorded together for Danish television as the Cecil Taylor Unit (the track "Four," featured on the Ayler box set Holy Ghost, was recorded during this time), and, upon returning to the United States, the group (with Ayler) performed at the Take Three club in Greenwich Village and at Philharmonic Hall, Lincoln Center in New York City on December 31, 1963, as the Cecil Taylor Jazz Unit, with Grimes back on bass. (The concert also featured Art Blakey and The Jazz Messengers and the John Coltrane Quintet featuring Eric Dolphy.) Murray stated that Ayler "didn't know New York from a can of beans. So, he came over to my house, and I took him to meet Archie (Shepp) and all the cats." Murray continued to play with Ayler, and went on to join Ayler's trio with bassist Gary Peacock. Murray recorded a number of albums with Ayler, including the historic Spiritual Unity. Val Wilmer wrote that Murray was "one of those crucial figures in jazz who appear just at the time they are needed. His unchained approach to percussion gave Ayler the freedom to travel his own road that had hitherto been lacking." Murray also stated that he played with John Coltrane in 1964, and was offered a spot in Coltrane's band, but turned it down.

Murray went on to record his own compositions under his own name, beginning in 1965 with Sonny's Time Now, which was released on Leroi Jones's Jihad label. The album features Ayler, Don Cherry, Henry Grimes, and Lewis Worrell, as well as Jones, who recites his poem "Black Art". (Murray stated "It’s a strange record because Albert and Don [Cherry] are playing like this [makes screeching sound].") Later, when he moved to Europe, he released three recordings on BYG Actuel. In addition, he continued to play and record as a sideman for a variety of musicians. In 1980, he reunited with Cecil Taylor for the recording of It Is in the Brewing Luminous, and in 1996, he recorded with Taylor again, resulting in the album Corona, released in 2018. He died on December 7, 2017, from multiple organ failure at the age of 81.

A documentary on Murray, entitled Sunny's Time Now: A Portrait of Jazz Drummer Sunny Murray, was released on DVD in 2008 by director Antoine Prum.

== Style ==
Murray was among the first to forgo the drummer's traditional role as timekeeper in favor of purely textural playing. Val Wilmer wrote:

Murray's aim was to free the soloist completely from the restrictions of time, and to do this he set up a continual hailstorm of percussion. His concept relied heavily on continuous ringing stick-work on the edge of the cymbals, an irregular staccato barrage on the snare, spasmodic bass drum punctuation and constant, but not metronomic, use of the sock-cymbal (hi-hat). He played with his mouth open, emitting an incessant wailing which blended into the overall percussion backdrop of shifting pulses... [H]is playing often seems to bear little relation to what the soloist is doing. What he did do, though, was to lay down a shimmering tapestry behind the soloist, enabling him to move wherever he wanted."

Concerning Murray's tenure with Albert Ayler, John Litweiler wrote: "Sunny Murray and Albert Ayler did not merely break through bar lines, they abolished them altogether." Amiri Baraka described Murray's playing as follows:

Watching Sonny play, as he swoops and floats, hovers, lunges, above and into the drums, it is immediate... his body-ness, his physicality in the music. Not just as a drum beater but as a conductor of energies, directing them this way and that way. Just scraping a cymbal this time, smashing it the next. Both feet straight out with the bass drums. His rolls and bombs the result of body-mined spirit feel. He wants "natural sounds," natural rhythms. The drum as a reactor and manifestor of energies coursing through and pouring out of his body. Rhythm as occurrence. As natural emphasis... You hear him moaning behind his instrument, with his other beautiful instrument. His voice. The sound of feeling. The moan, a ragged body-spasm sound, like some kind of heavy stringed instrument, lifting all the other sounds into prayers.

Author Norman C. Weinstein wrote:

[Murray] radically rethinks the role of the drum kit, sees the kit as a kinetic sculpture... The drums are a sculpture he dances around, giving the drum kit a numinosity like African drums utilized for ritual purposes. By dancing about the drums, not merely alertly sitting before them, he maximizes the force of his contact with all surfaces, not just skins but metal and wood as well. The sheer physicality of his approach assures a broader spectrum of timbres than those usually achieved by players utilizing conventional posture. Murray's dance in fast motion... creates the illusion of several drummers performing simultaneously, a stuttering strobe effect akin to how Duchamp caused his nude to trip the light fantastic down a staircase... The richness of Murray's cymbal crashes and vocals is beautifully reinforced by his drum attacks, particularly his sonorous tattoos on the bass drum. He has an astute gift for playing off extreme tonal contrasts, high-pitched cymbals ringing in counterpoint to earth-moaning bass drum tones... He... creates a sense of time which might be appreciated by a tradition-minded African, not time measured by Timex, not shaped by a cymbal's metronomic insistences, but time as the poet Blake understood it, found in the pulsation of an artery.

Murray acknowledged the influence of Hermann Helmholtz in developing his unique approach to the drum kit, stating that "Helmholtz gave me the technique I needed." Referring to Murray's rapid fluttering of the bass drum and washes and waves of cymbal noise, bassist Alan Silva stated "...it was the end of swing as we know it. It became so fast it became slow. Sunny Murray is the first drummer who ever played the theory of relativity." Murray described his own musical goals as follows: "I work for natural sounds rather than trying to sound like drums. Sometimes I try to sound like car motors or the continuous crackling of glass... not just the sound of drums but the sound of the crashing of cars and the upheaval of a volcano and the thunder of the skies." At one point he attempted to design a different kind of drum set that would be "more in touch with the human voice in terms of humming and screaming and laughing and crying."

== Discography ==
=== As leader ===
- Sonny's Time Now (Jihad, 1965)
- Sunny Murray (ESP Disk, 1966)
- Sunshine (BYG, 1969)
- Big Chief (Pathe, 1969)
- Homage to Africa (BYG, 1970)
- An Even Break (Never Give a Sucker) (BYG, 1970)
- Charred Earth (Kharma, 1977)
- Apple Cores (Philly Jazz, 1978)
- Live at Moers Festival (Moers Music, 1979)
- Aigu-Grave (Marge, 1980)
- 13# Steps On Glass (Enja, 1995)
- Illumination (InRespect, 1995)
- Illuminators (Audible Hiss, 1996)
- Homework (Super Secret Sound, 1997)
- We Are Not at the Opera (Eremite, 1998)
- Home Cooking in the UK (Foghorn, 2004)
- Perles Noires (Eremite, 2005)
- The Gearbox Explodes! (Foghorn, 2008)
- Sonic Liberation Front Meets Sunny Murray (High Two, 2010)
- I Stepped Onto a Bee (Foghorn, 2011)
- Boom Boom Cat (Foghorn, 2011)

=== As sideman ===
With Albert Ayler

- Spirits (Debut, 1964)
- Ghosts (Debut, 1965)
- Spirits Rejoice (ESP Disk, 1965)
- Spiritual Unity (ESP Disk, 1965)
- Bells (ESP Disk, 1965)
- The New Wave in Jazz (Impulse!, 1965)
- New York Eye and Ear Control (ESP Disk, 1966)
- Swing Low Sweet Spiritual (Osmosis, 1971)
- Prophecy (ESP Disk, 1975)
- The Hilversum Session (Osmosis, 1980)
- Albert Ayler (Philology, 1990)
- Albert Smiles with Sunny (InRespect, 1996)
- Bells Prophecy (ESP Disk, 1997)
- Live in Greenwich Village (Impulse!, 1998)
- The Copenhagen Tapes (Ayler 2002)
- Holy Ghost: Rare & Unissued Recordings (1962–70) (Revenant, 2004)
- The Impulse Story (Impulse!, 2006)
- Copenhagen Live 1964 (hatOLOGY, 2017)

With Louie Belogenis

- Tiresias (Porter, 2011)

With Dave Burrell

- Echo (BYG, 1969)
- High (Douglas, 1969)
- High Won-High Two (Arista/Freedom, 1976)

With Arthur Doyle

- Dawn of a New Vibration (Fractal, 2000)
- Live at Glenn Miller Café (Ayler, 2001)
- Live at the Tunnel (Sinner Lady Gloria, 2017)

With Khan Jamal

- Infinity (Jambrio 1984)
- Speak Easy (Gazell, 1989)

With Keshavan Maslak

- Mayhem in Our Streets (Waterland 1980)
- Loved by Millions (Leo 1981)

With David Murray

- Recording N.Y.C. 1986 (DIW, 1986)
- A Sanctuary Within (Black Saint, 1992)

With Archie Shepp

- Black Gipsy (America, 1970)
- Live at the Pan-African Festival (BYG, 1971)
- Pitchin Can (America, 1970)
- Yasmina, a Black Woman (BYG, 1969)

With Alexander von Schlippenbach

- Smoke (FMP, 1990)
- Light Blue (Enja, 1997)

With Cecil Taylor

- Live at the Cafe Montmartre (Debut, 1963)
- Nefertiti, the Beautiful One Has Come (Debut, 1965)
- Innovations (Freedom, 1972)
- Into the Hot (Impulse!,1962)
- The New Breed (ABC Impulse!, 1978) (reissue of tracks from Into the Hot)
- It Is in the Brewing Luminous (Hat Hut, 1981)
- Air (Candid, 1990)
- Corona (FMP, 2018)

With others

- Billy Bang, Outline No. 12 (Celluloid, 1982 [1983])
- Borah Bergman, Monks (Somerealmusic, 2019)
- John Blum, In the Shade of Sun (Ecstatic Peace!, 2009)
- Jacques Coursil, Trails of Tears (Sunnyside, 2010)
- Bill Dixon, Bill Dixon 7-tette/Archie Shepp and the New York Contemporary 5 (Savoy, 1964])
- David Eyges, Crossroads (Music Unlimited 1982)
- Charles Gayle, Kingdom Come (Knitting Factory, 1994)
- Burton Greene, Firmanence (Fore, 1980)
- Gunter Hampel, Journey to the Song (Within Birth 1974)
- Jimmy Lyons, Jump Up / What to Do About (Hat Hut, 1981)
- Itaru Oki, Paris Ohrai (Ohrai 2001)
- Odean Pope, Plant Life (Porter, 2008)
- Aki Takase, Clapping Music (Enja, 1995)
- Telectu, Quartetos (Clean Feed, 2002)
- Clifford Thornton, Ketchaoua (BYG, 1969)
- Assif Tsahar, Ma (Hopscotch, 2003)
- Francois Tusques, Intercommunal Music (Shandar, 1971)
- Mark O'Leary, Ode to Albert Ayler (Ayler Records, 2009)
