= Ghosts (Albert Ayler album) =

Studio album by Albert Ayler Quartet
- Released: 1965
- Recorded: September 14, 1964 in Copenhagen, Denmark
- Genre: Free jazz
- Length: 37:35
- Label: Debut (Denmark) DEB 144; Freedom AL 1000
- Producer: Ole Vestegaard Jensen

Albert Ayler chronology
New York Eye and Ear Control (1964)	Ghosts (1965)	The Hilversum Session (1965)

Vibrations Cover

Ghosts is the second album release by American free jazz saxophonist Albert Ayler's quartet featuring Don Cherry, Gary Peacock and Sonny Murray recorded in Copenhagen in 1964 and first released on the Dutch Debut label then later released on the Freedom label as Vibrations.

== Reception ==
Professional ratings
Review scores
Source	Rating
AllMusic	3/5 stars
The Rolling Stone Jazz Record Guide	5/5 stars
The Penguin Guide to Jazz	3/4 stars

The AllMusic review by Scott Yanow awarded the album 3 stars stating: "It helps greatly to have open ears to appreciate this music, although Ayler's jams would become a bit more accessible the following year. Recommended". Michael Toland wrote: "Vibrations is practically a primer on sixties free jazz... Both horn blowers are in top form here, with Cherry blazing on the second version of 'Ghosts' like a man possessed and Ayler powering through the title track as in pursuit of the demons that did it. Vibrations is a fine introduction to the style for free jazz neophytes." Ethan Iverson wrote that Vibrations is "well-recorded and has marvelous playing by all members of the quartet. Don Cherry's casual, unfettered melodies offset Ayler's fulminations perfectly; Gary Peacock's initial virtuosic salvo with Ayler remains one of the glories of his extensive discography."

== Track listing ==
All compositions by Albert Ayler.

1. "Ghosts (short version)" - 2:08
2. "Children" - 6:53
3. "Holy Spirit" - 8:30
4. "Ghosts (extended version)" - 7:58
5. "Vibrations" - 5:00
6. "Mothers" - 7:06

== Personnel ==
- Albert Ayler - tenor saxophone
- Don Cherry - cornet
- Gary Peacock - bass
- Sonny Murray - drums
