= Albert Ayler =

American jazz saxophonist (1936–1970)

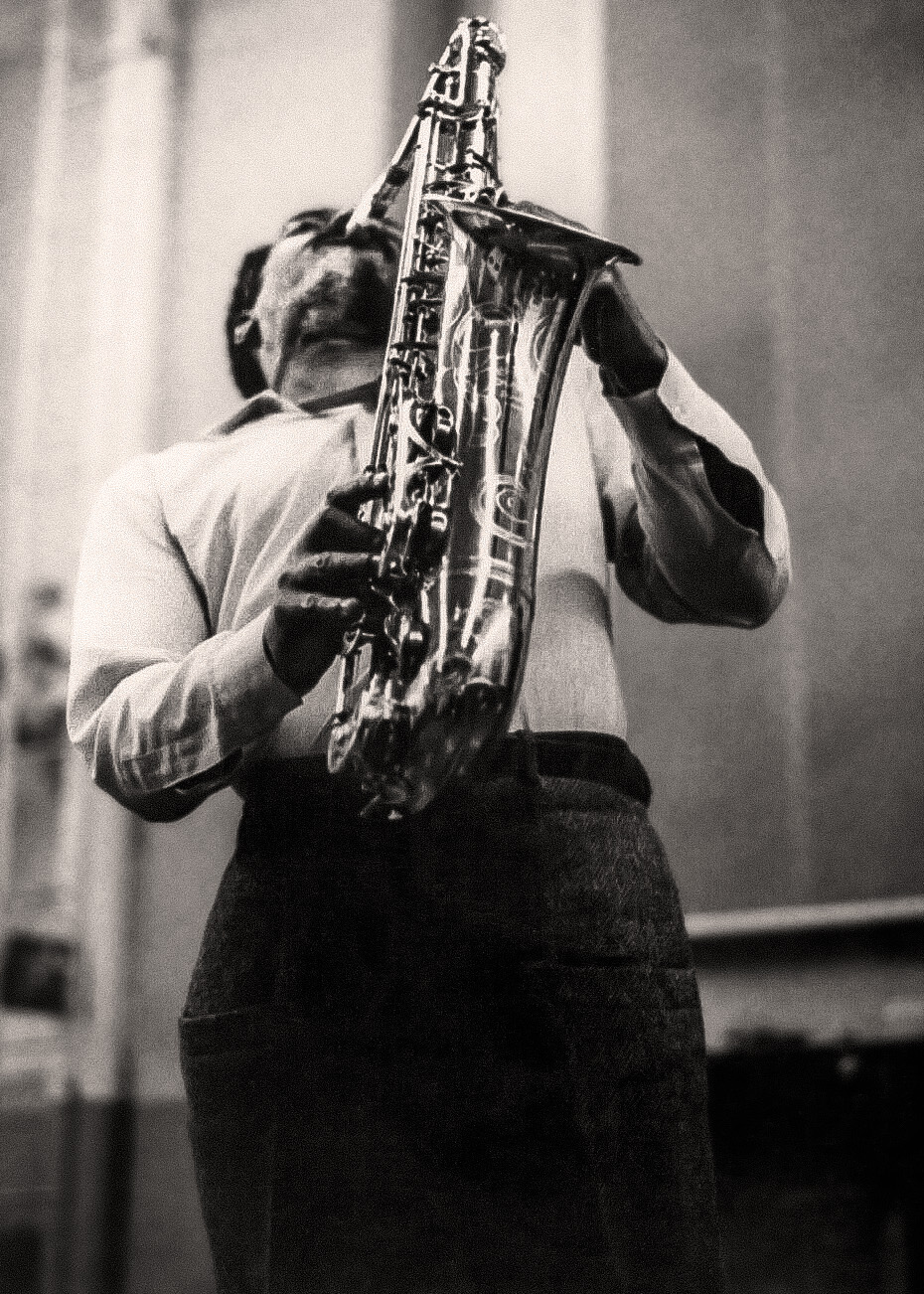
- Ayler c. 1967–68

Background information
- Born: July 13, 1936; Cleveland, Ohio, U.S.
- Died: November 25, 1970 (aged 34) New York City, New York, U.S.
- Genres: Avant-garde jazz, free jazz
- Occupations: Saxophonist, bandleader, composer
- Instruments: Tenor saxophone, alto saxophone, soprano saxophone, bagpipes
- Years active: 1952–1970
- Labels: Bird Notes, ESP-Disk, Impulse!, Ayler

Albert Ayler (/ˈaɪlər/; July 13, 1936 – November 25, 1970) was an American avant-garde jazz saxophonist and composer.

After early experience playing rhythm and blues and bebop, Ayler began recording music during the free jazz era of the 1960s. However, some critics argue that while Ayler's style is undeniably original and unorthodox, it does not adhere to the generally accepted critical understanding of free jazz. In fact, Ayler's style is difficult to categorize, and it evoked incredibly strong and disparate reactions from critics and fans alike. His innovations have inspired many subsequent jazz musicians.

His trio and quartet records of 1964, such as Spiritual Unity and The Hilversum Session, show him advancing the improvisational notions of John Coltrane and Ornette Coleman into abstract realms where whole timbre, and not just mainly harmony with melody, is the music's backbone. His ecstatic music of 1965 and 1966, such as "Spirits Rejoice" and "Truth Is Marching In", has been compared by critics to the sound of a brass band, and involved simple, march-like themes which alternated with wild group improvisations and were regarded as retrieving jazz's pre-Louis Armstrong roots.

== Biography ==
=== Early life and career ===
Born in Cleveland, Ohio, and raised in Shaker Heights, Ayler was first taught alto saxophone by his father Edward, who was a semiprofessional saxophonist and violinist. Edward and Albert played alto saxophone duets in church and often listened to jazz records together, including swing era jazz and then-new bop albums. Ayler's upbringing in the church had a great impact on his life and music, and much of his music can be understood as an attempt to express his spirituality, including the aptly titled Spiritual Unity, and his album of spirituals, Goin' Home, which features "meandering" solos that are meant to be treated as meditations on sacred texts, and at some points as "speaking in tongues" with his saxophone. Ayler's experience in the church and exposure to swing jazz artists also impacted his sound: his wide vibrato was similar to that of gospel saxophonists, who sought a more vocal-like sound with their instruments, and to that of brass players in New Orleans swing bands.

Ayler attended John Adams High School on Cleveland's East Side, and graduated in 1954 at the age of 18. He later studied at Academy Music in Cleveland with jazz saxophonist Benny Miller. Ayler also played the oboe in high school. As a teenager, Ayler's understanding of bebop style and mastery of standard repertoire earned him the nickname of "Little Bird", after Charlie "Bird" Parker, in the small Cleveland jazz scene.

In 1952, at the age of 16, Ayler began playing bar-walking, honking, R&B-style tenor with blues singer and harmonica player Little Walter, spending two summer vacations with Walter's band. In 1958, after graduating from high school, Ayler joined the United States Army, where he switched from alto to tenor sax and jammed with other enlisted musicians, including tenor saxophonist Stanley Turrentine. Ayler also played in the regiment band, along with future composer Harold Budd. In 1959 he was stationed in France, where he was further exposed to the martial music that would be a core influence on his later work. After his discharge from the army, Ayler tried to find work in Los Angeles and Cleveland, but his increasingly iconoclastic playing, which had moved away from traditional harmony, was not welcomed by traditionalists.

Ayler relocated to Sweden in 1962, where his recording career began, leading Swedish and Danish groups on radio sessions and jamming as an unpaid member of Cecil Taylor's band in the winter of 1962–63. (Long-rumored tapes of Ayler performing with Taylor's group were released by Revenant Records in 2004, as part of a 10-CD set.) The album My Name Is Albert Ayler is a session of standards recorded for a Copenhagen radio station with local musicians including Niels-Henning Ørsted Pedersen and drummer Ronnie Gardiner, with Ayler playing tenor and soprano on tracks such as "Summertime".

=== Early recording career ===
In 1963, Ayler returned to the US and settled in New York City, where he continued to develop his personal style and occasionally played alongside free jazz pianist Cecil Taylor. 1964 was the most well-documented year of Ayler's career, during which he recorded many albums, the first of which was Spirits (re-released later as Witches and Devils) in March of that year. Ayler also began his rich relationship with ESP-Disk Records in 1964, recording his breakthrough album (and ESP's very first jazz album) Spiritual Unity for the then-fledgling record label. ESP-Disk came to play an integral role in recording and disseminating free jazz. Spiritual Unity featured the trio that Ayler had just assembled that summer, including bassist Gary Peacock and drummer Sunny Murray. The liner notes of Spiritual Unity include a brief description of the musicians on that day, July 10, 1964, in the Variety Arts Recording Studio:

Just before 1 PM, Sunny Murray arrived, a large, genial walrus....Gary Peacock was next, tall, thin, ascetic looking, and soft spoken....Albert Ayler was last, small, wary, and laconic.

On July 17, 1964, the members of this trio, along with trumpet player Don Cherry, alto saxophonist John Tchicai, and trombonist Roswell Rudd, collaborated in recording New York Eye and Ear Control, a freely improvised soundtrack to Canadian artist and filmmaker Michael Snow's film of the same name. During this time, Ayler began to garner some attention from critics, although he was not able to foster much of a fan following. However, later in 1964, Ayler, Peacock, Murray, and Cherry were invited to travel to Europe for a brief Scandinavian tour, which too yielded some new recordings, including The Copenhagen Tapes, Ghosts (re-released later as Vibrations), and The Hilversum Session.

Ayler recorded Bells on May 1, 1965. It is a ferociously paced 20-minute improvisation featuring his signature military-march influenced melodies. Spirits Rejoice was recorded on September 23, 1965, at Judson Hall in New York City, and features a much larger band than the sparse trio of his earlier album Spiritual Unity. The Encyclopedia of Popular Music describes Spirits Rejoice as a "riotous, hugely emotional and astonishingly creative celebration of the urge to make noise." Both albums feature Albert's brother, trumpet player Donald Ayler, who translated his brother's expansive approach to improvisation to the trumpet. Donald played with Albert until he experienced a debilitating nervous breakdown in 1967.

In 1966 Ayler was signed to Impulse Records at the urging of Coltrane, the label's star attraction at that time. But even on Impulse, Ayler's radically different music never found a sizable audience. Ayler's first set for Impulse was recorded a few weeks before Christmas in 1966, entitled Albert Ayler in Greenwich Village. Ayler performed with his brother, Michel Samson, Beaver Harris, Henry Grimes, and Bill Folwell, while Coltrane was in attendance. For a tune titled "For John Coltrane", Ayler returned to the alto saxophone for the first time in years.

Ayler first sang on a recording in a version of "Ghosts" performed in Paris in 1966, in which his vocal style was similar to that of his saxophone, with an eerie disregard for pitch. Ayler continued to experiment with vocals for the rest of his career (see, for example, the wordless vocalising near the end of "Love Cry" from the album of the same name); however, his singing on later albums such as New Grass and Music Is the Healing Force of the Universe has been the subject of some derision. Val Wilmer referred to his singing as "tortuous", and critics have stated that "his words and vocal delivery are truly frightening", describing him as having "a bellowing, untrained voice that was wavering at its most controlled," and delivering lyrics in "a manic wail".

In 1967, John Coltrane died of liver cancer, and Ayler was asked to perform at his funeral. (One of Coltrane's last wishes was that Ayler and Ornette Coleman should play at his funeral.) It is said that during his performance, Ayler ripped his saxophone from his mouth at two points: once, to emit a cry of anguish, the other a cry of joy to symbolize his friend and mentor's ascension into heaven. Ayler later recalled: "John was like a visitor to this planet. He came in peace and he left in peace; but during his time here, he kept trying to reach new levels of awareness, of peace, of spirituality. That's why I regard the music he played as spiritual music - John's way of getting closer and closer to the Creator." In the liner notes for Ayler's album Love Cry, Frank Kofsky wrote that Ayler said the following concerning Coltrane's album Meditations: "The father, son, and holy ghost. What Coltrane was talking about there - maybe it was a biblical term: he was the father, Pharoah was the son, and I was the holy ghost. And only he could tell me things like that."

=== Final years and death ===
For the next two-and-a-half years Ayler began to move from a mostly improvisatory style to one that focused more closely on compositions. Some considered this a result of pressures from Impulse who, unlike ESP-Disk, placed heavier emphasis on accessibility than artistic expression. In 1967 and 1968, Ayler recorded three LPs that featured the lyrics and vocals of his girlfriend Mary Maria Parks and introduced regular chord changes, funky beats, and electronic instruments.

Ayler himself sang on his album New Grass, which hearkened back to his roots in R&B as a teenager. However, this album was unsuccessful, scorned by Ayler fans and critics alike. Ayler staunchly asserted that he wanted to move in this R&B and rock-and-roll direction, and that he was not simply succumbing to the pressures of Impulse and the popular music of that day, and it is true that Ayler heavily emphasizes the spirituality that seems to define the bulk of his work. (However, according to Gary Giddins, "In interviews, Ayler left no doubt about who was responsible for New Grass: 'They told me to do this. Bob Thiele. You think I would do that? He said, "Look Albert, you gotta get with the young generation now."'") New Grass begins with the track "Message from Albert", in which Ayler speaks directly to his listener, explaining that this album was nothing like his ones before it, that was of "a different dimension in [his] life." He claims that, "through meditation, dreams, and visions, [he has] been made a Universal Man, through the power of the Creator..."

At around this time, there were hints that Ayler was becoming emotionally unstable, blaming himself for his brother's breakdown. In 1969, he submitted an impassioned, rambling open letter to the Cricket magazine entitled "To Mr. Jones—I Had a Vision", in which he described startling apocalyptic spiritual visions. He "saw in a vision the new Earth built by God coming out of Heaven," and implored the readers to share the message of Revelations, insisting that "This is very important. The time is now." Noah Howard recalled seeing Ayler that summer, wearing gloves and a full-length fur coat despite the heat, his face covered in Vaseline, and saying "Got to protect myself."

His final album, Music Is the Healing Force of the Universe, featured rock musicians such as Henry Vestine of Canned Heat alongside jazz musicians like pianist Bobby Few. This was a return to his blues-roots with very heavy rock influences, but did feature more of Ayler's signature timbre variations and energetic solos than the unsuccessful New Grass.

In July 1970, Ayler returned to the free jazz idiom for a group of shows in France (including at the Fondation Maeght, documented on Nuits de la Fondation Maeght), but the band he was able to assemble (Call Cobbs, bassist Steve Tintweiss and drummer Allen Blairman) was not regarded as being of the caliber of his earlier groups.

Ayler disappeared on November 5, 1970, and he was found dead in New York City's East River on November 25, a presumed suicide. For some time afterwards rumors circulated that Ayler had been murdered, a long-standing urban legend claiming the Mafia had tied him to a jukebox.

== Artistry ==
Ayler routinely showcased his highly untraditional personal saxophone style in very conventional musical contexts, including children's songs, march melodies, and gospel hymns. However, Ayler's wild energy and intense improvisations transformed them into something nearly unrecognizable. Ayler took a deconstructive approach to his music, which was characteristic of the free jazz era. Phil Hardy says that Ayler "dismantled" melody and harmony to more deeply explore "the physical properties" of his saxophone. Ayler wished to free himself and his bandmates to improvise, relate to one another, and relate to their instruments on a more raw, "primal" level.

The intensely spiritual aspect of Ayler's music was clearly aligned with the beliefs of jazz saxophonist John Coltrane, who was profoundly affected by the "otherworldly" sounds of Ayler's music. This effect is especially evident in Coltrane's albums Meditations and Stellar Regions. (Coltrane served as a mentor throughout Ayler's life, providing financial and professional support.) This intensity, the extremes to which Ayler took his tenor saxophone, is the most defining aspect of his sound. His style is characterized by timbre variations, including squeaks, honks, and improvisation in very high and very low registers. He possessed a deep blistering tone—achieved by using the stiff plastic Fibrecane no. 4 reeds on his tenor saxophone—and used a broad, pathos-filled vibrato.

Ayler experimented with microtonality in his improvisations, seeking to explore the sounds that fall between the notes in a traditional scale. This technique was best showcased when he played, as he often did, without a piano, backed only by bass and drums. Ayler also resisted the standard swing beat, and instead built momentum through the frenetic speed of his improvisatory lines, which he forcefully overblew from his saxophone. Jazz historian Ted Gioia describes Ayler as a "virtuoso of the coarse and anomalous", and claims that Ayler aimed to break away from the constraints of playing notes and instead to "enter into a new realm in which the saxophone created "sound"."

== Influence and legacy ==
At no point in his career was Ayler allowed the comfort of a steady audience. Despite largely positive critical reception, he remained poor for his entire life and often sought financial support from his family and fellow musicians, including Coltrane.

However, Ayler remains influential. His unique sound played an important role in the formation of contemporary hardcore punk, noise music, and experimental rock styles. To this day his albums are among the best selling in the narrow genre of "free jazz." 21st century free jazz saxophonists, such as Charles Gayle, Ken Vandermark, Peter Brötzmann, and David S. Ware, were all heavily influenced by Albert Ayler. Ayler was also a crucial influence on some of his contemporaries such as Frank Lowe, Rev. Frank Wright, Charles Tyler (on Ayler's album Bells), Marion Brown, and Frank Smith (on ESP-Disk Burton Greene Quartet).

Ayler developed a close friendship with John Coltrane, and the two influenced each other's playing. Coltrane said that Ayler "filled an area that it seems I hadn't got to. I think what he's doing, it seems to be moving music into even higher frequencies." Ayler stated: "when he [Coltrane] started playing, I had to listen just to his tone... To listen to him play was just like he was talking to me, saying, 'Brother, get yourself together spiritually. Just one sound - that's how profound this man was..." According to Val Wilmer, "the relationship between the two men was a very special one. They talked to each other constantly by telephone and by telegram and Coltrane was heavily influenced by the younger man." Coltrane first heard Ayler in 1962, after which he told Ayler that "he had heard himself playing like that in a dream once." In February of the following year, Ayler sat in with Coltrane's group for the first time during a gig at the Jazz Temple in Cleveland, Ohio. Beginning that year, "Coltrane and Ayler, when both in New York, were often in the same room. Various recollections have placed Coltrane watching Ayler and Cecil Taylor at the Take 3 Coffeehouse in the West Village in the fall of 1963; watching Ayler and Eric Dolphy together at the Half Note sometime that year; inviting Ayler onstage at the Half Note in March 1964; hearing Ayler's group with Rashied Ali at a little performance space at 27 Cooper Square in early 1965." Following the recording of Ascension in June 1965 (after Ayler had sent him copies of his albums Ghosts and Spiritual Unity), Coltrane "called Ayler and told him, 'I recorded an album and found that I was playing just like you.' Albert's reply: 'No man, don't you see, you were playing like yourself. You were just feeling what I feel and were just crying out for spiritual unity." While in Antibes a month later, Coltrane "remained... in his hotel room, practicing as usual, playing along to a tape of an Ayler concert."

The Swedish filmmaker Kasper Collin was so inspired by Ayler's music and life that he produced a documentary, My Name Is Albert Ayler, which includes interviews with ESP-Disk founder Bernard Stollman, along with interviews with Ayler's family, girlfriends and bandmates. The film includes footage of Albert Ayler (from 1962, 1964, 1966 and 1970) and is built around his music and recordings of his voice (from interviews made between 1963 and 1970).

On his 1969 album Folkjokeopus, English guitarist/singer-songwriter Roy Harper, dedicated the song "One for All" ("One for Al") to Albert Ayler, "who I knew and loved during my time in Copenhagen". Harper considered Ayler to be "one of the leading jazzmen of the age". In the Folkjokeopus liner notes, Harper states, "In many ways he [Ayler] was the king".

Canadian artist Stan Douglas's video installation Hors-champs (meaning "off-screen") addresses the political context of free jazz in the 1960s, as an extension of black consciousness. Improvising Ayler's "Spirits Rejoice", four American musicians, George E. Lewis (trombone), Douglas Ewart (saxophone), Kent Carter (bass) and Oliver Johnson (drums), who lived in France during the free jazz period in the 1960s, perform in the installation, a recreation of 1960s French television.

In 1990, pianist Giorgio Gaslini released Ayler's Wings, a CD consisting entirely of solo interpretations of Ayler's compositions. In 1999, John Lurie of the Lounge Lizards released a piece titled "The Resurrection of Albert Ayler". Composer and guitarist Marc Ribot recorded an album dedicated to Ayler's Spiritual Unity in 2005 with former Ayler bassist and free jazz leader Henry Grimes.

Ayler's tune "Ghosts" has been recorded by a number of musicians, including Gary Lucas, David Moss, Crazy Backwards Alphabet, Lester Bowie, Eugene Chadbourne, and Gary Windo.

Albert Ayler is the titular 'ghost of a jazzman' in Maurice G. Dantec's 2009 science-fiction novel Comme le fantôme d'un jazzman dans la station Mir en deroute.

Starting in 2018, late Chicago saxophonist Mars Williams recorded and released four CDs in a series called "Mars Williams Presents An Ayler Xmas", documenting annual Christmastime live concerts, recorded in Chicago, Vienna, Krakow, and New York City and featuring intertwined holiday standards and Albert Ayler music.

== Discography ==
Released	Recorded	Album	Original Issue
1963	1962	Something Different!!!!!! (The First Recordings Vols. 1 & 2)	Bird Notes
1964	1963	My Name Is Albert Ayler	Debut
1964	1964	Spirits (re-released as Witches & Devils)	Debut
1971	1964	Swing Low Sweet Spiritual	Osmosis
1975	1964	Prophecy [Live]	ESP-Disk
1996	1964	Albert Smiles With Sunny [Live]	Inrespect
1965	1964	Spiritual Unity	ESP
1966	1964	New York Eye and Ear Control	ESP
2002	1964	The Copenhagen Tapes	Ayler
1965	1964	Ghosts (re-released as Vibrations)	Debut
1980	1964	The Hilversum Session	Osmosis
1965	1965	Bells [Live]	ESP
1965	1965	Spirits Rejoice	ESP
1965	1965	Sonny's Time Now (Sunny Murray's album)	Jihad
1965	1965	The New Wave in Jazz [Live]	Impulse!
2022	1966	La Cave Live, Cleveland 1966 Revisited	ezz-thetics
1982	1966	At Slug's Saloon, Vol. 1 & 2 [Live]	ESP
1990	1964–66	Albert Ayler [Live]	Philology
2011	1966	Stockholm, Berlin 1966 [Live]	hat MUSICS
1982	1966	Lörrach / Paris 1966 [Live]	hat MUSICS
1967	1965–67	In Greenwich Village [Live]	Impulse!
1998	1965-1967	Live in Greenwich Village: The Complete Impulse Albums (IMPD-2-273)	Impulse!
1968	1967–68	Love Cry	Impulse!
1969	1968	New Grass	Impulse!
1970	1969	Music Is the Healing Force of the Universe	Impulse!
1971	1969	The Last Album	Impulse!
2005	1970	Live on the Riviera [Live]	ESP
1971	1970	Nuits de la Fondation Maeght Vol. 1 [Live]	Shandar
1971	1970	Nuits de la Fondation Maeght Vol. 2 [Live]	Shandar
2022	1970	Revelations: The Complete ORTF 1970 Fondation Maeght Recordings	Elemental Music
2004	1960–70	Holy Ghost: Rare & Unissued Recordings (1962–70)	Revenant

=== Compilations ===
(this list is incomplete)

- The Complete ESP-Disk Recordings (ESP, 2006)
- European Radio Studio Recordings 1964 (hatOLOGY, 2016)
- The Early Albums Collection (Enlightenment, 2020)
