= Holy Ghost: Rare & Unissued Recordings (1962–70) =

Compilation album by Albert Ayler
- Released: October 9, 2004
- Recorded: September 14, 1960 – 1971
- Genre: Jazz
- Label: Revenant

Holy Ghost: Rare & Unissued Recordings (1962–70) is a compilation album by avant-garde saxophonist Albert Ayler released by Revenant Records in 2004.

The 9-CD Box Set, housed in a reproduction "Spirit Box" contains live performances recorded by Ayler in Helsinki, Copenhagen, New York City, Cleveland, Berlin, Rotterdam, Newport and Saint-Paul-de-Vence over an eight-year period and features a variety of line-ups which include Cecil Taylor, Sunny Murray, Jimmy Lyons, Gary Peacock, Don Cherry, Rashied Ali, Milford Graves, Donald Ayler, Ronald Shannon Jackson, Michael Samson, Frank Wright, Beaver Harris, Pharoah Sanders, Richard Davis, Sam Rivers, and Muhammad Ali.

The set includes two discs of interviews, a 208-page book featuring essays by Val Wilmer, Amiri Baraka, and others, reproductions of memorabilia, a dried dogwood flower, and a bonus disc featuring Ayler's recordings with the 76th A.G. Army Band.

== Reception ==
Professional ratings
Review scores
Source	Rating
AllMusic	4.5/5 stars
The Penguin Guide to Jazz Recordings	4/4 stars

The AllMusic review by Thom Jurek states the following:

Revenant's amazing package certainly adds weight and heft to the argument for Ayler's true place in the jazz pantheon, not only as a practitioner of free jazz but as one of the music's true innovators...What Revenant has accomplished is to shine light into the darkened corners of myth and apocrypha; the label has added flesh-and-bone documented history to the ghost of a giant. Ayler struggled musically and personally to find and hold onto the elusive musical/spiritual balance that grace kissed him with only a few times during his lifetime—on tape anyway. But the quest for that prize, presented here, adds immeasurably to both the legend and the achievement.

The authors of The Penguin Guide to Jazz Recordings awarded the album a full four stars, calling it "a titanic body of material... the Holy Grail of Ayler studies."

The Wire named the box set the "record of the year" in its annual critics' poll. In December 2005, art directors Susan Archie and Noel Waggener were nominated for a 2006 Grammy Award for Best Boxed or Special Limited Edition Package for Holy Ghost: Rare & Unissued Recordings (1962–70).

== Track listing ==
All compositions by Albert Ayler except as indicated

Disc One

1. "Sonnymoon for Two" (Sonny Rollins) - 8:32
2. "Summertime" (George Gershwin, Ira Gershwin) - 6:56
3. "On Green Dolphin Street" (Bronislau Kaper) - 3:33
4. Spoken Introduction by Broadcast Announcer and Borge Roger Henrichsen - 0:41
5. "Four" (Cecil Taylor) - 21:50
6. "Spirits" [Incomplete Take] - 6:44
7. "Saints" - 10:34
8. "Ghosts" [Incomplete Take] - 10:55

Recorded June 30, 1962, in Helsinki, Finland (tracks 1–3), November 16, 1962, in Copenhagen, Denmark (tracks 4–5) and June 14, 1964, at the Cellar Cafe in New York City (tracks 6–8)

Disc Two

1. "The Wizard" - 6:56
2. "Children" - 9:04
3. "Spirits" [Theme] - 0:31
4. Spoken Radio Introduction - 0:55
5. "Spirits" - 8:43
6. "Vibrations" - 8:22
7. "Tune Q" [Untitled Track] - 8:58
8. "Mothers" - 7:52
9. "Children" - 8:38
10. "Spirits" [Theme] - 1:26
11. "Untitled" [Untitled Track] (Collective) - 8:56

Recorded June 14, 1964, in New York City (tracks 1–3), September 3, 1964, at Cafe Monmartre in Copenhagen, Denmark (tracks 4–10) and February 1966 at Slugs' in New York City (track 11)

Disc Three

1. Spoken Introduction by Peter Bergman - 1:02
2. "Spirits Rejoice" - 4:39
3. "D.C." (Don Cherry) - 5:58
4. "Untitled Minor Waltz" - 7:03
5. "Our Prayer" (Donald Ayler) - 6:36
6. Spoken Introduction by Peter Bergman - 1:12
7. "F# Tune" [Untitled Track] - 15:20
8. "Ghosts" - 6:44
9. "Spirits Rejoice" - 6:31
10. "Prophet/Ghosts/Spiritual Bells" - 14:32
11. "Our Prayer/Spirits Rejoice" (Don Ayler/Albert Ayler) - 9:42

Recorded April 16 (tracks 1–8) & 17 (tracks 9–11), 1966 at La Cave in Cleveland

Disc Four

1. "Untitled/Truth Is Marching In" - 15:40
2. "Spirits" - 9:23
3. "Zion Hill" - 12:39
4. "Spirits" - 7:00
5. "Spiritual Bells" - 3:53
6. "F# Tune" [Untitled Track] - 9:17

Recorded April 17, 1966, at La Cave in Cleveland

Disc Five

1. Concert Announcement by Ralf Schulte-Bahrenberg - 1:09
2. "Ghosts/Bells" - 11:15
3. "Truth Is Marching In" - 7:07
4. "Omega" - 3:48
5. "Our Prayer" (Don Ayler) - 4:42
6. Spoken Introduction by Peter DeWit - 1:25
7. "Truth Is Marching In" - 11:13
8. "Bells" - 5:34
9. "Spirits Rejoice" - 10:51
10. "Free Spiritual Music, Part IV" - 6:45

Recorded November 3, 1966, at the Berlin Philharmonie, Germany (tracks 1–5) and November 8, 1966, at De Doelen, Rotterdam, The Netherlands (tracks 6–10)

Disc Six

1. "Truth Is Marching In/Omega" - 9:08
2. "Japan/Universal Indians" (Traditional/Albert Ayler) - 5:45
3. "Our Prayer" (Don Ayler) - 8:25
4. "Love Cry/Truth Is Marching In/Our Prayer" (Albert Ayler/Albert Ayler/Don Ayler) - 6:26
5. "Venus/Upper and Lower Egypt" (Pharoah Sanders) - 23:04
6. "Blues" [Untitled Track] - 6:09
7. "Sermon" [Untitled Track] - 0:55
8. "Thank God for Women" (Albert Ayler, Mary Parks) - 10:20
9. "New Ghosts" [Demo Fragments] (Albert Ayler, Mary Parks) - 7:09

Recorded June 30/July 31, 1967, at Freebody Park, Newport, Rhode Island (tracks 1–3), July 27, 1967, at St. Peter's Lutheran Church, New York City (track 4), January 21, 1968, at the Renaissance Ballroom, New York City (track 5) and late August 1968 in New York City (tracks 6–9)

Disc Seven

1. "Prophet John" (Don Ayler) - 10:53
2. "Judge Ye Not" (Don Ayler) - 10:19
3. "Mothers/Children" - 8:41
4. "Untitled" [Incomplete Take] - 14:18
5. "C Minor" [Untitled Track] - 5:21
6. "F Minor/C Minor" [Untitled Track] - 10:38

Recorded January 11, 1969, at Town Hall, New York City (tracks 1–2), July 28, 1970, at La Colle sur Loup, Saint-Paul-de-Vence, France (tracks 3–6)

Disc Eight
Albert Ayler interviews with Birger Jorgense and Daniel Caux

Recorded December 1964 & November 1966 in Copenhagen, Denmark; and July 27, 1970, in Saint-Paul-de-Vence, France

Disc Nine
Albert Ayler interview with Kiyoshi Koyama
Don and Mocqui Cherry Interview with Daniel Caux

Recorded July 25, 1970, in Saint-Paul-de-Vence, France; and Paris, France in 1971

Bonus Disc

1. "Tenderly" (Walter Gross, Jack Lawrence) - 4:32
2. "Leap Frog" (Joe Garland) - 3:15

Recorded September 14, 1960, in Orleans, France

== Personnel ==
- Albert Ayler: tenor saxophone, soprano saxophone, alto saxophone, vocal, recitation
- Herbert Katz: guitar (Disc One tracks 1–3)
- Teuvo Suojarvi: piano (Disc One tracks 1–3)
- Heikki Annala: bass (Disc One tracks 1–3)
- Martti Aijanen: drums (Disc One tracks 1–3)
- Cecil Taylor: piano (Disc One track 5)
- Jimmy Lyons: alto saxophone (Disc One track 5)
- Sunny Murray: drums (Disc One tracks 5–8, Disc Two tracks 1–10)
- Gary Peacock: bass (Disc One tracks 6–8, Disc Two tracks 1–10)
- Don Cherry: cornet (Disc Two tracks 4–10)
- Burton Greene: piano (Disc Two track 11)
- Frank Smith: tenor saxophone (Disc Two track 11)
- Steve Tintweiss: bass (Disc Two track 11, Disc Seven tracks 3–6)
- Rashied Ali: drums (Disc Two track 11)
- Donald Ayler: trumpet (Disc Three, Disc Four, Disc Five, Disc Six tracks 1–3, Disc Seven tracks 1–2)
- Michael Samson: violin (Disc Three, Disc Four, Disc Five, Disc Six tracks 1–3)
- Muntawef Shaheed: bass (Disc Three, Disc Four)
- Ronald Shannon Jackson: drums (Disc Three, Disc Four)
- Frank Wright: tenor saxophone (Disc Four)
- Bill Folwell: bass (Disc Five, Disc Six tracks 1–3) electric bass (Disc Six tracks 6–9)
- Beaver Harris: drums (Disc Five)
- Milford Graves: drums (Disc Six tracks 1–4)
- Richard Davis bass (Disc Six track 4, Disc Seven tracks 1–2)
- Pharoah Sanders; tenor saxophone (Disc Six track 5)
- Dave Burrell: piano (Disc Six track 5)
- Sirone: bass (Disc Six track 5)
- Roger Blank: drums (Disc Six track 5)
- Call Cobbs: piano rocksichord (Disc Six tracks 6–9, Disc Seven tracks 3–6)
- Bernard Purdie: drums (Disc Six tracks 6–9)
- Mary Parks: vocal, tambourine (Disc Six tracks 6–9, Disc Seven tracks 3–6)
- Vivian Bostic: vocal (Disc Six tracks 6–9)
- Sam Rivers: tenor saxophone (Disc Seven tracks 1–2)
- Richard Johnson: piano (Disc Seven tracks 1–2)
- Ibraham Wahen: bass (Disc Seven tracks 1–2)
- Muhammad Ali: drums (Disc Seven tracks 1–2)
- 76th A.G. Army Band (Bonus Disc)
