= Revenant Records =

Record label set up by John Fahey

- Founder: John Fahey, Dean Blackwood
- Genre: Folk, blues
- Country of origin: U.S.
- Location: Austin, Texas
- Official website: www.revenantrecords.com

Revenant Records is an American independent record label based in Austin, Texas, which concentrates on folk and blues. Revenant was formed in 1996 by John Fahey and Dean Blackwood. Revenant's 2001 box set, Screamin' and Hollerin' the Blues: The Worlds of Charley Patton, won three Grammy Awards in 2003.

Revenant gained fame among free jazz fans in 2004 when it released Holy Ghost: Rare & Unissued Recordings (1962-70), a 9-CD box set of rare and unissued recordings and interviews by saxophonist Albert Ayler.

Other notable releases from Revenant are Harry Smith's Anthology of American Folk Music, Vol. 4 (2000) and John Fahey's posthumous album Red Cross (2003).

== See also ==
- List of record labels
- Grammy Awards of 2003
