= Archie Shepp discography =

The discography of American jazz musician Archie Shepp encompasses approximately one hundred and thirteen albums.

== Discography ==
=== As leader/co-leader ===
Recording date	Title	Label	Year released	Notes
1962-10	Archie Shepp – Bill Dixon Quartet	Savoy	1963	
1963-11	The House I Live In	SteepleChase	1980	Live with the Lars Gullin Quintet
1964-08	Four for Trane	Impulse!	1965	
1965-02, 1965-03	Fire Music	Impulse!	1965	
1965-07	New Thing at Newport	Impulse!	1966	Live split album with John Coltrane
1965-03, 1965-08	On This Night	Impulse!	1965	
1966-02	Archie Shepp Live in San Francisco	Impulse!	1966	Live
1966-02	Three for a Quarter, One for a Dime	Impulse!	1969	Live
1966-08	Mama Too Tight	Impulse!	1967	
1967-04	The Magic of Ju-Ju	Impulse!	1968	
1967-10	Life at the Donaueschingen Music Festival	SABA	1967	Live
1968-01	The Way Ahead	Impulse!	1968	Bonus tracks rec. 1989
1969-07	Live at the Pan-African Festival	BYG Actuel	1971	Live
1969-08	Yasmina, a Black Woman	BYG Actuel	1969	
1969-08	Poem for Malcolm	BYG Actuel	1969	
1969-08	Blasé	BYG Actuel	1969	
1968-09, 1969-02, 1969-08	For Losers	Impulse!	1970	
1968-09, 1969-02, 1969-08	Kwanza	Impulse!	1974	
1969-11	Black Gipsy	America	1970	
1969-11, 1969-12	Archie Shepp & Philly Joe Jones	America	1970	Septet with Anthony Braxton, Leroy Jenkins a.o.
1971-05	Things Have Got to Change	Impulse!	1971	
1970-07	Live In Antibes (Vol.1 & Vol.2)	BYG Actuel	1971	Live with the Full Moon Ensemble
1969-11, 1970-07	Pitchin Can	America	1970	
1970-07	Coral Rock	America	1973	
1970-11	Doodlin'	Inner City	1976	
1972-01	Attica Blues	Impulse!	1972	big band recording
1972-09	The Cry of My People	Impulse!	1973	big band recording
1975-04	There's a Trumpet in My Soul	Freedom	1975	
1975-07	Montreux One	Freedom	1976	Live
1975-07	Montreux Two	Freedom	1976	Live
1975-08	A Sea of Faces	Black Saint	1975	with Shirley Bunnie Foy
1975-09	Jazz a Confronto 27	Horo	1976	
1975-09, 1975-10	Body and Soul	Horo	1978	
1975-10	Mariamar	Horo	1976	
1975-10	U-Jaama (Unite)	Uniteledis	1976	Live
1975-10	Bijou	Musica	1976	Live
1976-05	Steam	Enja	1976	Live
1976-06	Live in Tokyo	Denon Jazz	1978	Live
1976-06	Hi-Fly	Compendium	1976	with Karin Krog
1976	Force: Sweet Mao - Suid Africa '76	Uniteledis	1976	[2LP] duo recording with Max Roach
1977-04	The Rising Sun Collection	Just a Memory	1994	
1977-04	Goin' Home	Steeplechase	1977	duo recording with Horace Parlan
1977-05	Ballads for Trane	Denon Jazz	1977	
1977-06	Day Dream	Denon Jazz	1977	
1977-10	The Tradition	Horo	1978	[2LP]
1977-10	Parisian Concert Vol. 1	Sun	1977	
1977-10	Parisian Concert Vol. 2	Sun	1978	
1977-10	A Touch of the Blues	Fluid	1977	featuring Joe Lee Wilson
1977-11	On Green Dolphin Street	Denon Jazz	1978	
1978-07	Maple Leaf Rag	Fluid	1978	
1978-09	Frankfurt Workshop '78: Tenor Saxes	Circle	1985	Live album with George Adams, Heinz Sauer
1978-10	Perfect Passions	West Wind	1992	with Siegfried Kessler, Wilbur Little, Clifford Jarvis (Recorded in Warsaw, Poland)
1978-11	Duet	Denon Jazz	1978	duo recording with Dollar Brand
1978-12	Lady Bird	Denon Jazz	1979	
1979-01	Things Have Got To Change: Live At The Totem Volume 1	Marge	1979	Live
1979-01	Bird Fire: A Tribute to Charlie Parker	Impro	1979	
1979-04	Tray of Silver	Denon Jazz	1979	
1979-10	Attica Blues Big Band Live At The Palais Des Glaces	Blue Marge	1979	[2LP] Live big band recording
1980-02	Trouble in Mind	Steeplechase	1980	duo recording with Horace Parlan
1980-02	Looking at Bird	Steeplechase	1981	duo recording with Niels-Henning Ørsted Pedersen
1980-10	Here Comes The Family	Någarå	1981	with Family of Percussion
1981-02	I Know About the Life	Sackville	1981	with Kenny Werner, Santie Debriano and John Betsch
1981-11	My Man - Tribute To Sydney Bechet	West Wind	1982	also released as Passport to Paradise: Archie Shepp Plays Sydney Bechet (1987)
1982-02	Mama Rose	Steeplechase	1982	Live duo album with keyboardist Jasper Van't Hof
1982-12	Soul Song	Enja	1983	
1984-02	Down Home New York	Soul Note	1984	
1984-10	African Moods	Circle	1984	Live album with Jeanne Lee at Leverkusener Jazztage, Germany
1985-05	California Meeting: Live on Broadway	Soul Note	1987	Live
1985-11	Passion	52e Rue Est	1986	
1985-12	Little Red Moon	Soul Note	1986	
1987-05	The Fifth of May	L+R	1987	duo recording with keyboardist Jasper Van't Hof
1987-05	Splashes	L+R	1987	Wilbur Little tribute
1987-05	Duo Reunion	L+R	1987	with Horace Parlan
1987-10	En concert: 1st set	52e Rue Est	1987	
1987-10	En concert: 2nd set	52e Rue Est	1987	
1988-01	Lover Man	Timeless	1989	featuring Annette Lowman
1989-03	En concert à Banlieues Bleues	52e Rue Est	1989	Live album with Chris McGregor, Harry Beckett, Annie Whitehead a.o.
1989-10	Body and Soul	Enja	1991	Live album with Richard Davis
1990-11	Blues	Alfa	1991	
1990-11	I Didn't Know About You	Timeless	1991	
1992-01	Black Ballads	Timeless	1992	
1992-01	Tenors of Yusef Lateef and Archie Shepp	YAL	1992	with Yusef Lateef
1995-11	Blue Ballads	Venus	1996	with John Hicks, George Mraz, Idris Muhammad
1996-06	Live In Paris	Twins Production	2000	Live album with Eric Le Lann
1996-12	True Ballads	Venus	1997	with John Hicks, George Mraz, Idris Muhammad
1996-12	True Ballads II	Venus	1997	with John Hicks, George Mraz, Idris Muhammad
1996-12	Something to Live For	Timeless	1997	
1998-09	True Blue	Venus	1999	with John Hicks, George Mraz, Billy Drummond
1999-01	Conversations	Delmark	1999	with Kahil El'Zabar's Ritual Trio
2000-09	Live in New York	Verve	2001	Live album with Roswell Rudd, Andrew Cyrille, Reggie Workman, Grachan Moncur III
2001-06	Deja Vu	Venus	2001	with Harold Mabern, George Mraz, Billy Drummond
2001?	Hungarian Bebop	BMC	2002	with the Mihály Dresch Quartet
2002-02	Left Alone Revisited	Enja	2002	duo recording with Mal Waldron
2003-05	First Take	Archieball	2005	with Siegfried Kessler
2003	Kindred Spirits Vol. 1	Archieball	2005	Live album with Dar Gnawa
2007-11	Phat Jam in Milano	Dawn of Freedom	2009	Live
2010-11	Wo!man	Archieball	2011	with Joachim Kühn
2017-09, 2018-11	Let My People Go	Archieball	2021	[2LP, CD, FLAC] Live album with Jason Moran
2020	Ocean Bridges	Redefinition	2020	[2LP] with Raw Poetic, Damu The Fudgemunk

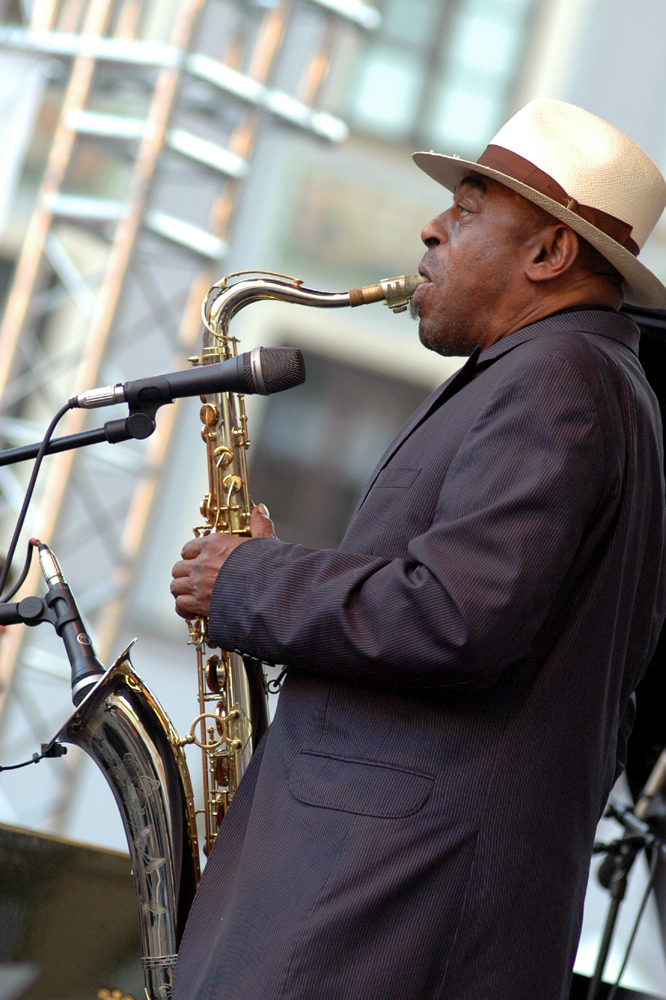
During a concert in Warsaw, Poland, in July 2008

Compilations

- Devil Blues (Circle, 1986) – including tracks from Frankfurt Workshop '78: Tenor Saxes
- Gemini (Archieball, 2007)[2CD] – recorded in 2002 and 2007
- Attica Blues Orchestra Live: I Hear The Sound (Archieball, 2013) – Live recorded in 2012 ("Festival Jazz à La Villette") and 2013 ("CNCDC Châteauvallon" and "Festival Les Nuits")

=== As a member ===
New York Contemporary Five

- Rufus (Fontana, 1963) – proto-NYCF, yet without Don Cherry
- Consequences (Fontana, 1963)
- New York Contemporary Five Vol. 1 (Storyville/Sonet, 1963)
- New York Contemporary Five Vol. 2 (Storyville/Sonet, 1963)
- Bill Dixon 7-tette/Archie Shepp and the New York Contemporary 5 (Savoy, 1964) – split album

=== As sideman ===
With John Coltrane

- A Love Supreme (Impulse!, 1965) – rec. 1964
- Ascension (Impulse!, 1966) – rec. 1965
- The Major Works of John Coltrane (GRP, 1992) – rec. 1965

With Sunny Murray

- Sunshine (BYG, 1969)
- Homage to Africa (BYG, 1970) – rec. in 1969

With Cecil Taylor

- The World of Cecil Taylor (Candid, 1961) – rec. 1960
- New York City R&B (Candid, 1961)
- Jumpin' Punkins (Candid, 1971) – rec. 1961
- Air (Candid, 1988) – rec. 1960
- Cell Walk for Celeste (Candid, 1988) – rec. 1961

With others

- Dave Burrell, Echo (BYG, 1969)
- Alan Silva, Luna Surface (BYG, 1969)
- Clifford Thornton, Ketchaoua (BYG, 1969)
- Art Matthews, It's Easy to Remember (Baystate, 1978) – rec. 1979
- Siegfried Kessler Trio, Invitation (Sun, 1980) – rec. 1979
- Material, One Down (Celluloid, 1982) – on "Memories", accompanying Whitney Houston on her debut as lead vocalist.
- Chet Baker, In Memory Of (L+R, 1988)
- Frank Zappa, You Can't Do That on Stage Anymore, Vol. 4 (Rykodisc, 1991) – live rec. 1969-88
- Jeff Silvertrust Quintet, Hip Knossis (Bulldozers From Jupiter, 2001)
- Mina Agossi Red Eyes (Naïve, 2011)
- Joachim Kühn, Voodoo Sense (ACT, 2013) – rec. 2011-12
- Alice Coltrane, Carnegie Hall '71 (Hi Hat, 2018) – live rec. 1971
- Alice Coltrane, The Carnegie Hall Concert (Impulse!, 2024) – live rec. 1971
