= Attica Blues Big Band Live at the Palais des Glaces =

Studio album by Archie Shepp
- Released: 1979
- Recorded: October 24, 1979
- Genres: Jazz, big band
- Length: 1:36:00
- Labels: Blue Marge; 1001
- Producer: Gérard Terronès

Archie Shepp chronology
The Long March (1979)	Attica Blues Big Band Live at the Palais des Glaces (1979)	Trouble in Mind (1980)

Attica Blues Big Band Live at the Palais des Glaces is a live double album by jazz saxophonist Archie Shepp recorded in live in Palais Des Glaces, Paris, France, on October 24, 1979 for the French Blue Marge label. This was seen as a live big band interpretation of his 1972 album Attica Blues

== Reception ==
Professional ratings
Review scores
Source	Rating
AllMusic	5/0 stars

AllMusic awarded the album 5 stars, stating: "This is big band arranging and execution at its best; Shepp and Coleman make it all sound so easy, though charts are anything, but when you're fusing together so many different kinds of music. This is the high point of the latter part of Shepp's career, and it's a cultural crime that it's not available on an American label and sold as a work that belongs next to Mingus' Ah Um, Miles' Bitches Brew, Ornette's Science Fiction, and other notable works by the masters.".

== Track listing ==
All compositions by Archie Shepp except where noted.

1. "Antes de Adios" (Terry Jenoure) – 2:50
2. "Star Love" – 3:34
3. "Moon Bees" – 5:54
4. "Attica Blues, Pt. One" (Archie Shepp, Beaver Harris) – 4:45
5. "Steam" – 7:37
6. "Quiet Dawn" (Cal Massey) – 5:48
7. "Hi-Fly" (Randy Weston) – 7:27
8. "U-Jaama" – 7:45
9. "Strollin'" (Horace Silver) – 6:10
10. "Ballad for a Child" – 5:40
11. "Simone" (Frank Foster) – 7:40
12. "Crucificado"(Dave Burrell) – 6:30
13. "A Change Has Come Over Me" (Walter Hawkins) – 5:40
14. "Goodbye Sweet Pops" (Cal Massey) – 6:00
15. "Skippin'" (Ramsey Lewis) – 4:30
16. "Attica Blues, Pt. Two" (Archie Shepp, Beaver Harris) – 8:40

== Personnel ==
- Archie Shepp – tenor saxophone, alto saxophone, soprano saxophone, piano, arranger, conductor
- Charles McGhee – trumpet
- Malachi Thompson – trumpet
- Roy Burrowes – trumpet
- Kamal Abdul Alim – trumpet
- Eddie Preston – trumpet
- Steve Turre – trombone, arranger
- Dick Griffin – trombone
- Charles Stephens – trombone
- Charles "Majeed" Greenlee – trombone, arranger, conductor
- Ray Harris – trombone
- Hakim Jami – acoustic bass, tuba
- James Ware – saxophone, flute
- John Purcell – saxophone, flute
- Marvin Blackman – saxophone, flute
- Patience Higgins – saxophone, flute
- Marion Brown – saxophone, flute
- Brandon Ross – guitar
- Art Matthews – piano
- Avery Sharpe – acoustic bass, electric bass
- Clifford Jarvis – drums
- Kevin Jones – percussion
- Clyde Criner – synthesizer
- Candice Greene – violin
- Terry Jenoure – violin, vocals (1, 4), backing vocals (16), arranger, conductor
- Carl Ector – viola
- Akua Dixon – cello, piano, vocals (4, 13), backing vocals (16)
- Irene Datcher – vocals (6, 10, 16)
- Joe Lee Wilson – vocals (5, 9, 12)
- Ray Copeland – arranger, conductor
- Gérard Terronès – producer
- Philippe Omnès – engineer
- Bernard Darsh – assistant sound engineer
