= The Way Ahead (album) =

Studio album by Archie Shepp
- Released: November 1968
- Recorded: January 29, 1968; February 26, 1969 (Bonus Tracks)
- Genre: Avant-garde jazz
- Length: 60:17
- Label: Impulse!
- Producer: Bob Thiele

Archie Shepp chronology
The Magic of Ju-Ju (1967)	The Way Ahead (1968)	For Losers (1971)

Professional ratings
Review scores
Source	Rating
AllMusic	4/5 stars
DownBeat	3.5/5 stars
The Penguin Guide to Jazz Recordings	4/4 stars
The Rolling Stone Jazz Record Guide	3/5 stars

The Way Ahead is an album by Archie Shepp, released on Impulse! Records in 1968. The album contains tracks recorded by Shepp, trumpeter Jimmy Owens, trombonist Grachan Moncur III, pianist Walter Davis Jr., bassist Ron Carter and drummers Roy Haynes and Beaver Harris in January 1968 with two additional tracks featuring baritone saxophonist Charles Davis, pianist Dave Burrell and bassist Walter Booker recorded in February 1969, and first released on Kwanza (1974), added to the CD release.

== Reception ==
The AllMusic review by Thom Jurek states: "The set is a glorious stretch of the old and new, with deep blues, gospel, and plenty of guttersnipe swing in the mix."

== Track listing ==
1. "Damn If I Know (The Stroller)" (Walter Davis Jr.) - 6:16
2. "Frankenstein" (Grachan Moncur III) - 13:50
3. "Fiesta" (Archie Shepp) - 9:54
4. "Sophisticated Lady" (Duke Ellington, Irving Mills, Mitchell Parish) - 7:08
5. "New Africa" (Moncur) - 12:55 Bonus track on CD
6. "Bakai" (Cal Massey) - 10:14 Bonus track on CD

- Recorded at RCA Studio, NYC, January 29, 1968 (tracks 1–4) and National Recording Studios, NYC, February 26, 1969 (tracks 5–6)

== Personnel ==
- Archie Shepp: tenor saxophone
- Jimmy Owens: trumpet
- Grachan Moncur III: trombone
- Walter Davis Jr.: piano (tracks 1–4)
- Ron Carter: bass (tracks 1–4)
- Roy Haynes: drums (tracks 3 & 4)
- Beaver Harris: drums (tracks 1 & 2; 5 & 6)
- Charles Davis: baritone saxophone (track 5 & 6)
- Dave Burrell: piano (tracks 5 & 6)
- Walter Booker: bass (tracks 5 & 6)
