= U-Jaama (Unite) =

Live album by Archie Shepp
- Released: 1976
- Recorded: October 24, 1975
- Genre: Jazz
- Label: Uniteledis Records

Archie Shepp chronology
Mariamar (1976)	U-Jaama (Unite) (1976)	Bijou (1976)

Professional ratings
Review scores
Source	Rating
AllMusic	3/5 stars

U-Jaama (Unite) is a live album by jazz saxophonist Archie Shepp recorded at Massy in 1975 and released on the French Uniteledis label as a double LP. This album is reissued in 2023 as Live at Massy.

== Track listing ==
All compositions by Archie Shepp except as indicated

1. "Blues For Don'l Duck" - 29:20
2. "U-Jaama (Unité)" - 13:50
3. "Hipnosis" - 18:00
4. "African Drum Suite" - 16:00
5. "52nd Street Theme" (Thelonious Monk) - 1:00

- Recorded at the 1st Independent Festival of Massy, October 24, 1975

== Personnel ==
- Archie Shepp - tenor saxophone
- Charles Greenlee - trombone
- Dave Burrell - piano
- Cameron Brown - bass
- Beaver Harris - drums
