= C. Sharpe =

American jazz saxophonist (1931–1990)

- Born: Clarence Hardy Sharpe; May 5, 1931; St. Louis, Missouri, U.S.
- Died: January 28, 1990 (aged 58) New York City, U.S.
- Genres: Jazz
- Occupation: Musician
- Instrument: Alto saxophone
- Years active: mid-1950s, late 1980s

Clarence Hardy Sharpe (May 5, 1931, St. Louis – January 28, 1990, New York City) was an American jazz alto saxophonist. (Note: Gary W. Kennedy writes, "obituaries published his age as 53; however, Sharpe himself gave his year of birth as 1931 in his application for social security.")

== Biography ==
Sharpe's stepfather, Nathaniel, was a saxophonist in Fletcher Henderson's orchestra, while his father was big band vocalist Benjamin Hardy. He was raised in Germantown, Philadelphia, Pennsylvania, where he led a student band as a high school student called "C Sharpe and the Flats". He began his professional career in and around Philadelphia, where he played with Jimmy Garrison, Cal Massey, Lee Morgan, and McCoy Tyner. After relocating to New York City, he worked with Jimmy McGriff, Steve Ellington, Kenny Dorham, Joe Henderson, and Archie Shepp over the course of the 1960s. After leaving music for a period, he returned in the 1980s, playing with the Jazz Disciples in 1983, Freddie Redd in 1985, Ari Roland in 1987, and with his own group late in the decade. His sidemen for this ensemble were Frank Hewitt, Leroy Williams, and Hal Dotson. A photo of Sharpe playing the saxophone was collected by Pannonica de Koenigswarter, member of the Rothschild family.

Sharpe died at Goldwater Memorial Hospital on Roosevelt Island in New York City at the age of 58, having recently undergone surgery for throat cancer.

== Style ==
Peter Watrous of The New York Times described Sharpe's approach to the saxophone as ''the missing link between Charlie Parker and Ornette Coleman.''

== Discography ==
=== As sideman ===
- Lee Morgan, Lee Morgan Indeed! (Blue Note, 1957)
- Freddie Redd, Lonely City (Uptown, 1989)
- Archie Shepp, For Losers (Impulse!, 1970)
- Archie Shepp, Kwanza (Impulse!, 1974)
