= Albert Ayler in Greenwich Village =

1967 live album by Albert Ayler

Live album by Albert Ayler
- Released: October 1967
- Recorded: December 18, 1966–February 26, 1967
- Genre: Free jazz
- Length: 37:28
- Label: Impulse!
- Producer: Bob Thiele

Albert Ayler chronology
Lörrach / Paris 1966 (1966)	Albert Ayler in Greenwich Village (1967)	Love Cry (1968)

Albert Ayler in Greenwich Village is a 1967 live album by American saxophonist Albert Ayler. It was his first album for Impulse! Records, and is generally regarded as being his best for the label. Originally released on LP, the album has since been reissued on CD.

== Background ==
At the urging of John Coltrane, Impulse! Records' first recordings of Ayler were made live. A single track recorded at the Village Gate in 1965 was released on the album The New Wave in Jazz and Albert Ayler in Greenwich Village was recorded at the Village Vanguard and Village Theatre, New York City in 1966 and 1967. Unusually, Ayler plays alto rather than his more usual tenor on the opening track, a tribute to Coltrane, who was present when the two tracks on side two of the album were recorded. The two versions of Ayler's band heard on the record both feature two bass players, which "sharpens the sound considerably, producing a rock-solid foundation for Ayler’s raw witness".

Further tracks from the same performances were released on the double album The Village Concerts, and both albums, along with the 1965 track mentioned above and one further track, were combined to produce the double CD album Live in Greenwich Village: The Complete Impulse Recordings.

== Reception ==
Professional ratings
Review scores
Source	Rating
AllMusic	4/5 stars
The Rolling Stone Jazz Record Guide	4/5 stars
DownBeat	5/5 stars
Jazz Magazine	9/10 stars

In a 1968 review for DownBeat, Pete Welding awarded the album 5 stars, and wrote: "Ayler and his confreres are creating their own ordered cosmos in their music, as they make that music. And this album offers the best, fullest, most perfect view of that musical cosmos I've heard so far... The music is vividly alive, churning, full of colors and textures, and relentlessly moving. There is a great deal of energy and restless passion to it, yet it doesn't sound 'disturbed' or otherwise disoriented. Ayler's music is not at all incomprehensible or difficult of access. All it requires is a pair of open ears, a willingness to enter a world of musical thought that might on the surface seem alien and uncomfortable. It's not, though. The vistas are fresh, the natives friendly and, as the ad says, 'getting there is half the fun.' There's a lot of the latter in Ayler's music. This album is worth your attention, believe me. Ayler may well be the Johnny Dodds of the avant garde, and in my book that's high praise, perhaps the highest."

Writing for AllMusic, Scott Yanow stated that In Greenwich Village was Ayler's best Impulse! album. Commenting on The Complete Impulse Recordings, the authors of The Penguin Guide to Jazz wrote that the sessions "are hugely affirmative and satisfyingly complete without losing a jot of Ayler's angry and premonitory force. These are some of the essential post-war jazz recordings, and they include some of Ayler's best playing... A remarkable record, to be prized by anyone who shares Ayler's lonely vigil on the planet."

== Track listing ==
All tracks composed by Albert Ayler (except where noted)

=== Albert Ayler In Greenwich Village (Impulse! AS-9155, 1967) ===
1. "For John Coltrane" (13:32)
2. "Change Has Come" (6:15)
3. "Truth Is Marching In" (12:12)
4. "Our Prayer" (Donald Ayler) (4:28)

=== The Village Concerts (Impulse! IA-9336/2, 1978) ===
1. "Light In Darkness" (10:56)
2. "Heavenly Home" (8:50)
3. "Spiritual Rebirth" (4:10)
4. "Infinite Spirit" (6:33)
5. "Omega is the Alpha" (10:30)
6. "Spirits Rejoice" (16:19)
7. "Divine Peacemaker" (12:28)
8. "Angels" (9:45)

=== Live In Greenwich Village – The Complete Impulse Recordings (Impulse! 052 273-2, 1998) ===
1. "Holy Ghost" (7:41)
2. "Truth Is Marching In" (12:42)
3. "Our Prayer" (Don Ayler) (4:45)
4. "Spirits Rejoice" (16:22)
5. "Divine Peacemaker" (12:37)
6. "Angels" (9:53)
7. "For John Coltrane" (13:40)
8. "Change Has Come" (6:24)
9. "Light in Darkness" (10:59)
10. "Heavenly Home" (8:51)
11. "Spiritual Rebirth" (4:26)
12. "Infinite Spirit" (6:37)
13. "Omega is the Alpha" (10:46)
14. "Universal Thoughts" (8:22)

== Personnel ==
=== Performance ===
- Albert Ayler – alto saxophone, tenor saxophone
- Donald Ayler – trumpet
- Call Cobbs Jr. – piano
- Bill Folwell – bass
- Joel Friedman – cello
- Henry Grimes – bass
- Beaver Harris – drums
- Michel Sampson – violin
- Alan Silva – bass

=== Production ===
- Barbara Flynn – design
- Robert Flynn – design
- Nat Hentoff – liner notes
- George Klabin – engineer
- Joe Lebow – design
- Charles Stewart – photography
- Bob Thiele – producer
