= Lee Morgan, Volume 2 =

Lee Morgan

Studio album by the Lee Morgan Sextet
- Released: End of May 1957
- Recorded: December 2, 1956
- Studio: Van Gelder Studio; Hackensack, New Jersey
- Genre: Hard bop
- Length: 40:32
- Label: Blue Note; BLP 1541
- Producer: Alfred Lion

Lee Morgan chronology
Introducing Lee Morgan (1956)	Lee Morgan (1957)	Dizzy Atmosphere (1957)

Lee Morgan, also known as Lee Morgan, Volume 2, is an album by the Lee Morgan Sextet, recorded on December 2, 1956 and released on Blue Note the following year. The sextet features saxophonists Hank Mobley and Kenny Rodgers and rhythm section Horace Silver, Paul Chambers and Charlie Persip.

== Reception ==
Professional ratings
Review scores
Source	Rating
AllMusic	3/5 stars

The AllMusic review by Scott Yanow calls the album "An above-average hard bop set".

== Track listing ==
All tracks composed by Benny Golson and arranged by Owen Marshall, except as noted.

=== Side 1 ===
1. "Whisper Not" – 7:20
2. "Latin Hangover" – 6:43
3. "His Sister" (Marshall, arr. Golson) – 6:32

=== Side 2 ===
1. "Slightly Hep" – 6:27
2. "Where Am I?" – 5:49
3. "D's Fink" (Marshall, arr. Golson) – 7:41

== Personnel ==
=== Musicians ===
- Lee Morgan – trumpet
- Hank Mobley – tenor saxophone
- Kenny Rodgers – alto saxophone
- Horace Silver – piano
- Paul Chambers – bass
- Charlie Persip – drums

=== Technical personnel ===
- Alfred Lion – producer
- Rudy Van Gelder – recording engineer, mastering
- Reid Miles – design
- Francis Wolff – photography
- Leonard Feather – liner notes
