= Jazz a Confronto 27 =

Studio album by Archie Shepp
- Released: 1976
- Recorded: September 28, 1975
- Genre: Jazz
- Label: Horo
- Producer: Aldo Sinesio

Archie Shepp chronology
| Body and Soul (1975) | Jazz a Confronto 27 (1976) | Mariamar (1976) |

Jazz a Confronto 27 is an album by jazz saxophonist Archie Shepp recorded in Rome, Italy, on September 28. 1975, and released on the Horo Records label as part of the "Jazz a Confronto" series.

== Track listing ==
All compositions by Archie Shepp

1. "Libya" - 21:20
2. "My Heart Cries Out to Africa" - 19:03

- Recorded in Rome, Italy on September 28, 1975

== Personnel ==
- Archie Shepp - tenor saxophone, soprano saxophone
- Charles Greenlee - trombone
- Dave Burrell - piano
- David Williams - bass
- Beaver Harris - drums
