= Little Esther (album) =

Studio album by Horace Parlan
- Released: 1987
- Recorded: March 12–13, 1987
- Genre: Jazz
- Length: 53:32
- Label: Soul Note

Horace Parlan chronology
Glad I Found You (1984)	Little Esther (1987)	Duo Reunion (1987)

Little Esther is an album by American jazz pianist Horace Parlan featuring performances recorded in 1987 and released on the Italian-based Soul Note label.

== Reception ==
The Allmusic review by Scott Yanow awarded the album 4 stars stating "straight-ahead but reasonably adventurous. A fine effort".

Professional ratings
Review scores
Source	Rating
Allmusic	4/5 stars
The Penguin Guide to Jazz Recordings	2.5/4 stars

== Track listing ==
All Compositions by Horace Parlan except as indicated

1. "Little Esther" - 7:48
2. "Opus 16a" - 6:52
3. "Snow Girl" (Per Goldschmidt) - 7:20
4. "Arrival" - 6:33
5. "Something for Silver" - 7:58
6. "Precious Lady" (Goldschmidt) - 8:38
7. "T for Jazz" (Klavs Hovman) - 8:23

== Personnel ==
- Horace Parlan - piano
- Per Goldschmidt - baritone saxophone
- Klavs Hovman - bass
- Massimo de Majo - drums
