= Blues to Africa =

1975 studio album by pianist Randy Weston

Studio album by Randy Weston
- Released: 1975
- Recorded: August 14, 1974
- Studio: The Aula Ramibuhl, Zurich, Switzerland
- Genre: Jazz
- Length: 40:31
- Label: Freedom; FLP 40153
- Producer: Alan Bates

Randy Weston chronology
Informal Solo Piano (1974)	Blues to Africa (1975)	Nuit Africaine (1975)

Blues to Africa is a solo piano album by American jazz pianist Randy Weston, recorded in 1974 and released on the Freedom label in 1975.

== Reception ==
Professional ratings
Review scores
Source	Rating
AllMusic	4/5 stars
The Rolling Stone Jazz Record Guide	3/5 stars

AllMusic awarded the album 4 stars, with its review by Scott Yanow stating: "This is a particularly strong solo performance by the unique pianist Randy Weston. He interprets eight of his originals, all of which are to an extent influenced by African music".

== Track listing ==
All compositions by Randy Weston.

1. "African Village/Bedford-Stuyvesant" - 5:15
2. "Tangier Bay" - 7:03
3. "Blues to Africa" - 5:05
4. "Kasbah Kids" - 3:14
5. "Uhuru Kwanza" - 5:02
6. "The Call" - 3:27
7. "Kucheza Blues" - 6:07
8. "Sahel" - 5:18

== Personnel ==
- Randy Weston - piano
