= Things Have Got to Change =

Studio album by Archie Shepp
- Released: 1971
- Recorded: May 17, 1971
- Studio: Van Gelder Studio, Englewood Cliffs, NJ
- Genre: Jazz
- Length: 37:42
- Label: Impulse!
- Producer: Ed Michel

Archie Shepp chronology
Doodlin' (1971)	Things Have Got to Change (1971)	Attica Blues (1972)

Professional ratings
Review scores
Source	Rating
Allmusic	3/5 stars

Things Have Got to Change is an album by avant-garde jazz saxophonist Archie Shepp released in 1971 on the Impulse! label. The album features a performance by Shepp with a large ensemble and vocal choir. The album "solidified the saxophonists reputation as a soulful, yet radical free jazz artist motivated by social commentary and cultural change".

== Track listing ==
1. "Money Blues, Parts 1 - 3" (Beaver Harris, Archie Shepp) - 18:20
2. "Dr. King, The Peaceful Warrior" (Cal Massey) - 2:29
3. "Things Have Got to Change, Parts 1 and 2" (Massey) - 16:53

Recorded at the Van Gelder Studio, Englewood Cliffs, NJ, May 17, 1971.

== Personnel ==
- Archie Shepp: tenor and soprano saxophone
- James Spaulding: alto saxophone, piccolo
- Roy Burrows, Ted Daniel: trumpet
- Charles Greenlee, Grachan Moncur III: trombone
- Howard Johnson: baritone saxophone
- Dave Burrell: electric piano
- Billy Butler, David Spinozza: guitar
- Roland Wilson: electric bass
- Beaver Harris: drums
- Ollie Anderson, Hetty "Bunchy" Fox, Calo Scott, Juma Sultan: percussion
- Joe Lee Wilson: lead vocal
- Anita Branham, Claudette Brown, Barbara Parsons, Ernestina Parsons, Jody Shayne, Anita Shepp, Johnny Shepp, Sharon Shepp: vocals
