= Splashes =

Studio album by Archie Shepp Quartet
- Released: 1987
- Recorded: May 4, 1987
- Studio: Studio 44, Monster Holland
- Genre: Jazz
- Length: 49:11
- Label: L+R; LR 45 005
- Producer: Wim Wigt

Archie Shepp chronology
Little Red Moon (1986)	Splashes (1987)	Duo Reunion (1987)

Splashes (subtitled Tribute to Wilbur Little) is an album by saxophonist Archie Shepp's Quartet, recorded in Holland in 1987 and released on the L+R label.

== Reception ==
Professional ratings
Review scores
Source	Rating
AllMusic	3/5 stars

The AllMusic review by Ron Wynn said "Bluesy, aggressive, typically expressive".

== Track listing ==
1. "Arrival" (Horace Parlan) – 4:49
2. "Steam" (Archie Shepp) – 10:15
3. "Reflexions" (Thelonious Monk) – 6:52
4. "Relaxing at Camarillo" (Charlie Parker) – 8:49
5. "Manhattan" (Vernon Duke) – 10:17
6. "Groovin' High" (Dizzy Gillespie) – 8:09

== Personnel ==
- Archie Shepp – tenor saxophone
- Horace Parlan – piano
- Harry Emmery – bass
- Clifford Jarvis – drums
