= La Cave Live, Cleveland 1966 Revisited =

Live album by Albert Ayler
- Released: January 20, 2022
- Recorded: April 16 and 17, 1966
- Venues: La Cave, Cleveland, Ohio
- Genre: Free jazz
- Labels: ezz-thetics 2-1123
- Producers: Bernhard Vischer, Christian C. Dalucas

La Cave Live, Cleveland 1966 Revisited is a live, double-CD album by American musician Albert Ayler. It was recorded in April 1966 at La Cave in Ayler's home town of Cleveland, Ohio, and was released by Hat Hut's ezz-thetics imprint in 2022 as part of their "Revisited" series. On the album, Ayler is heard on tenor saxophone, and is joined by his brother, trumpeter Donald Ayler, saxophonist Frank Wright, violinist Michel Samson, bassist Mutawef A. Shaheed (Clyde Shy), and drummer Ronald Shannon Jackson.

The recordings were made "under difficult technical circumstances" with a single microphone and used tapes, but were remastered by Michael Brändli for this release. Although the tracks previously appeared in their original form on Holy Ghost: Rare & Unissued Recordings (1962–70), La Cave Live represents "the first authorized release by permission of the Estate of Albert Ayler."

== Reception ==
Professional ratings
Review scores
Source	Rating
All About Jazz	3.5/5 stars

In a review for All About Jazz, Chris May wrote: "Wright does not so much bring a new dimension to the mostly familiar material performed on La Cave Live as enhance it. The album makes a fine companion piece to ezz-thetics' Lorrach, Paris 1966 and Stockholm, Berlin 1966, both of which cover similar ground."

Gabriel Bristow, writing for Point of Departure, stated: "These recordings contain the essence of Ayler's marching music: themes that never give up, that defy their self-imposed disintegration. Songs that implode, detonate average distinctions, emit unrelenting sparks of darkness. Shrieks and moans along a knife-edge of agony and joy. Strings that ooze hot dissonance behind a ragged flaming battering ram of breath. Horns that coil. The avant-garde melted down by the heat of history unhinged: the door is off its hinges, the frame is wide open, the Holy Ghost steps right through with the last angel of history flying out the bell of his horn."

The New York City Jazz Record's Marc Medwin noted that the album "should be a model for anyone wishing to play the sound restoration game," and commented: "Each cataclysmic thunderbolt and molten river of fire music gives way to passages of piquant serenity, almost resembling chamber music. It is unlikely that this iteration of the April 1966 material will be bettered."

In an article for DownBeat, Peter Margasak stated that, in relation to the tracks issued on Holy Ghost: Rare & Unissued Recordings, the remastered music "sounds so much richer and nuanced thanks to Brändli's engineering magic it may as well be an entirely new discovery."

== Track listing ==
"Our Prayer" composed by Donald Ayler. "D.C." composed by Don Cherry. Remaining tracks composed by Albert Ayler.

=== Disc 1 ===
1. "Spirits Rejoice" – 6:23
2. "Prophet/Ghosts/Spiritual Bells" – 14:22
3. "Our Prayer/Spirits Rejoice" – 9:37
4. "Untitled/The Truth Is Marching In" – 15:34
5. "Spirits" – 9:08
6. "Zion Hill" – 12:43

=== Disc 2 ===
1. "Spirits" – 7:01
2. "Spiritual Bells" – 3:47
3. "Untitled (F# Tune)" – 9:06
4. "Spirits Rejoice" – 4:33
5. "D.C." – 5:42
6. "Untitled (Minor Waltz)" – 6:50
7. "Our Prayer" – 6:30
8. "Untitled (F# Tune)" – 15:13
9. "Ghosts" – 6:18
- Disc 1 and Disc 2, tracks 1–3 recorded on April 17, 1966, at La Cave, Cleveland. Disc 2, Tracks 4–9 recorded on April 16, 1966, at La Cave, Cleveland.

== Personnel ==
- Albert Ayler – tenor saxophone
- Donald Ayler – trumpet
- Frank Wright – tenor saxophone (Disc 1 and Disc 2, tracks 1–3)
- Michel Samson – violin
- Mutawef A. Shaheed (Clyde Shy) – double bass
- Ronald Shannon Jackson – drums
