= Other Voices, Other Blues =

Studio album by Sun Ra Quartet
- Released: 1978
- Recorded: January 8–13, 1978
- Studio: Horo Voice, Rome
- Genre: Free jazz
- Length: 75:36
- Label: Horo; HDP 23–24
- Producer: Aldo Sinesio

Sun Ra chronology
New Steps (1978)	Other Voices, Other Blues (1978)	Media Dreams (1978)

Other Voices, Other Blues is a double album by jazz composer, bandleader and keyboardist Sun Ra and his Quartet, recorded in Italy in 1978 and originally released on the Italian Horo label.

== Reception ==
The AllMusic review by Sean Westergaard stated, "This is really a great setting to hear what these guys can do as soloists, with the easy-to-follow changes of the blues and stripped-down ensemble. Luqman Ali's drumming is the anchor, and everyone gets plenty of solo space. Fans of John Gilmore should surely seek this out, but Michael Ray and Sun Ra are also simply fantastic".

Professional ratings
Review scores
Source	Rating
AllMusic	4/5 stars

== Track listing ==
All compositions by Sun Ra

Side one:

1. "Spring and Summer Idyll" – 13:21
2. "One Day in Rome" – 5:24

Side two:

1. "Bridge on the Ninth Dimension" – 14:25
2. "Along the Tiber" – 4:04

Side three:

1. "Sun, Sky and Wind" – 6:30
2. "Rebellion" – 12:17

Side four:

1. "Constellation" – 9:15
2. "The Mystery of Being" – 10:20

== Personnel ==
- Sun Ra – piano, Crumar Mainman organ, vocals
- John Gilmore – tenor saxophone, percussion, vocals
- Michael Ray – trumpet, vocals
- Luqman Ali – drums
