= Love Cry =

Studio album by Albert Ayler
- Released: 1968
- Recorded: August 31, 1967 & February 13, 1968
- Studio: Capitol (New York City)
- Genre: Jazz
- Length: 35:05
- Label: Impulse! AS-9165
- Producer: Bob Thiele

Albert Ayler chronology
Albert Ayler in Greenwich Village (1967)	Love Cry (1968)	New Grass (1968)

Professional ratings
Review scores
Source	Rating
Allmusic	3/5 stars
The Rolling Stone Jazz Record Guide	4/5 stars
The Penguin Guide to Jazz Recordings	3/4 stars

Love Cry is a 1968 album by jazz saxophonist Albert Ayler, released on Impulse! Records in 1968. It was originally reissued on CD by GRP with two previously unreleased alternate takes and one previously unreleased outtake. The cover claimed that "Universal Indians" is presented as a longer extended edit, but it is actually identical to the original LP. The later twofer CD edition (paired with "The Last Album") discards the bonus tracks.

Love Cry marked the last recorded appearance of Donald Ayler with his brother. Shortly after the recording session, he departed the band and returned to Cleveland.

== Reception ==
In a review for AllMusic, Al Campbell awarded the album three stars, writing "Ayler's uncompromising musical freedom mixed with his catchy combination of nursery rhythms and brass band marches remained prominent on Love Cry. The interplay between the Ayler brothers also remained fiery as younger sibling Donald is heard playing trumpet for the last time on a recording with his brother... The rhythm section of Alan Silva on bass and Milford Graves on drums continually instigates and propels this music into furious militaristic march territory." An article in Jazzwise stated: "The swirling psychedelic typography that adorns the cover of this often overlooked album from Ayler's discography hints at the direction he was heading at the time. Along with John Coltrane's Om and Archie Shepp’s The Magic of Ju Ju, this was experimental acid jazz at its most potent."

Writing for All About Jazz, Tim Niland called Love Cry "one of Ayler's finest LPs", stating that it "features short themes and improvisations that are accessible, yet experimental and stick in the mind like an earworm long afterward. Ayler re-visits some of his well known themes like 'Ghosts' and 'Bells' re-arranged for lucid short blasts of music. Cobbs' harpsichord is a wildcard, but it works quite well, giving the music an unusual and unique sound. Graves and Silva are an inspired rhythmic team, giving free flow to a wealth of musical ideas and Ayler sounds simply magisterial throughout. 'Universal Indians' shows that they didn't leave their roots behind, it's a free-jazz blowout with a nice trumpet and tenor dialogue that is ripe and torrid, while Graves is simply extraordinary propelling everyone ever onward, it is also the album's one epic, clocking in at almost ten minutes."

Phil Freeman, in an article for Burning Ambulance, commented: "Love Cry... is in some ways an attempt by Impulse! to 're-introduce' Ayler. 'Ghosts' and 'Bells' had originally been cut in much more furious and lengthy versions for ESP-Disk; here, the band... focuses more on the melodies than the solos, and the two horns intertwine and converse in a way that's quite beautiful, while also bringing in strong elements of R&B and New Orleans polyphony. Cobbs' harpsichord is a strange and occasionally disquieting element; on 'Dancing Flowers,' he's playing trills that sound like music from the soundtrack to a silent horror movie, as Silva bows the bass portentously and Graves rattles around the kit."

== Track listing (GRP release including alternate takes / outtake) ==
- All compositions by Albert Ayler
1. "Love Cry" - 3:54
2. "Ghosts" - 2:45
3. "Omega" - 3:14
4. "Dancing Flowers" - 2:19
5. "Bells" - 3:07
6. "Love Flower" - 3:30
7. "Love Cry II" - 7:13
8. "Zion Hill (Alternate Take)" - 4:13
9. "Universal Indians (Alternate Take)" - 7:35
10. "Zion Hill" - 6:06
11. "Universal Indians" - 9:49
- Tracks 1–6 were recorded on August 31, 1967. Tracks 7–11 were recorded on February 13, 1968. All tracks were recorded at Capitol Studios, New York City.
- Tracks 1–6 and 10–11 appeared on the original 1968 release.

== Personnel ==
- Albert Ayler - tenor saxophone, alto saxophone (#1, 10), vocals (#1, 9, 11)
- Donald Ayler - trumpet (# 1–3, 5, 7, 9, 11)
- Alan Silva - bass
- Milford Graves - drums
- Call Cobbs - electric harpsichord (#3, 4, 6, 8, 10)

== Production ==
- Engineer - Bob Arnold
- Producer - Bob Thiele
- Reissue Producer - Michael Cuscuna
- Executive Producer - Dave Grusin, Larry Rosen
