= Hi-Fly (Karin Krog and Archie Shepp album) =

Studio album by Karin Krog and Archie Shepp
- Released: 1976
- Recorded: June 23, 1976
- Studio: Arne Bendiksen Studio, Oslo, Norway
- Genre: Vocal jazz, Jazz
- Length: 48:07
- Label: Compendium Records
- Producer: Frode Holm, Karin Krog

Karin Krog chronology
Different Days, Different Ways (1974)	Hi-Fly (1976)	Three's a Crowd (1977)

Archie Shepp chronology
Steam (1976)	Hi-Fly (1976)	Force: Sweet Mao - Suid Africa '76 (1976)

Hi-Fly is a 1976 album by jazz singer Karin Krog and saxophonist Archie Shepp.

== Reception ==
Professional ratings
Review scores
Source	Rating
Allmusic	4.5/5 stars
The Penguin Guide to Jazz Recordings	3/4 stars

Allmusic awarded the album four and a half stars with reviewer Michael G. Nastos writing that "All standards interpreted innovatively."

The Rough Guide to Jazz wrote that "Krog is impressive with Shepp, surviving a sometimes overbearing context and making an exquisite job of Carla Bley's "Sing Me Softly of the Blues" for which Krog wrote her own lyrics".

== Track listing ==
1. "Sing Me Softly of the Blues" (Carla Bley, Karin Krog) – 6:21
2. "Steam" (Archie Shepp) – 8:07
3. "Day Dream" (Duke Ellington, Billy Strayhorn, John La Touche) – 9:26
4. "(In My) Solitude" (Ellington, Eddie DeLange, Irving Mills) – 3:34
5. "Hi-Fly" (Randy Weston) – 14:01
6. "Soul Eyes" (Mal Waldron) – 6:38

== Personnel ==
- Karin Krog – vocals
- Archie Shepp – tenor saxophone
- Charles Greenlee – trombone
- Jon Balke – piano
- Arild Andersen – double bass
- Cameron Brown – single bass
- Beaver Harris – drums
