= Horo Records =

Italian jazz record label (defunct)

Horo Records was an Italian jazz record label, operated by Aldo Sinesio.

== Discography ==
=== HDP series ===
- HDP 1-2 Irio De Paula orchestra Casinha Branca
- HDP 3-4 Sam Rivers trio Black Africa 1
- HDP 5-6 Sam Rivers trio Black Africa 2
- HDP 7-8 Ran Blake solo piano Open City
- HDP 9-10 Max Roach quartet The Loadstar
- HDP 11-12 Michael Smith duo Elvira Madigan
- HDP 13-14 Archie Shepp trio The Tradition
- HDP 15-16 M.E.V.: Lacy / Teitelbaum / List / Berger sextet United Patchwork
- HDP 17-18 Lee Konitz / Martial Solal Duo Duplicity
- HDP 19-20 Sun Ra Arkestra Unity
- HDP 21-22 Karl Berger duo Changing the Time
- HDP 23-24 Sun Ra Quartet featuring John Gilmore Other Voices, Other Blues
- HDP 25-26 Sun Ra Quartet featuring John Gilmore New Steps
- HDP 27-28 Burton Greene solo piano It's All One
- HDP 29-30 Lester Bowie African Children
- HDP 31-32 Gil Evans Orchestra Parabola
- HDP 33-34 Gunter Hampel / Jeannie Lee duo Oasis
- HDP 35-36 Bennink / Mengelberg / Rutherford / Schiano quartet A European Proposal
- HDP 37-38 Garrett List/ Lancaster/ Shahid, Etc. quartet American Images
- HDP 39-40 Wheeler / Rudd / Potts /Evan / Parker / Rjewski / Honsiger / Lacy / Lytton, etc. orchestra Laboratorio della Quercia
- HDP 41-42 Joe Venuti & Joe Albany quintet Joe Venuti & Joe Albany

=== Complete HZ Series (12 single LPs) ===
- HZ 01: Archie Shepp – Mariamar
- HZ 02: Don Pullen – Five to Go
- HZ 03: George Adams / Don Pullen Quintet – Suite for Swingers
- HZ 04: Michael Smith –The Dualities of Man
- HZ 05: Steve Lacy – Threads
- HZ 06: Ran Blake – Crystal Trip
- HZ 07: Jean-François Jenny-Clark & Aldo Romano – Divieto di Santificazione
- HZ 08: Steve Lacy – The Catch
- HZ 09: David Murray– Sur-real Saxophone
- HZ 10: Archie Shepp – Body and Soul
- HZ 11: Steve Lacy – Eronel
- HZ 12: Roswell Rudd – The Definitive Roswell Rudd

=== Complete hll Series Jazz a Confronto (35 single LPs) ===
- hll 101-1 Irio De Paula quartet
- hll 101-2 Marcello Rosa group
- hll 101-3 Gianni Basso quartet
- hll 101-4 Frank Rosolino quartet
- hll 101-5 Giancarlo Schiaffini sextet
- hll 101-6 Giancarlo Barigozzi trio
- hll 101-7 Martin Joseph trio
- hll 101-8 M. Schiano / Giorgio Gaslini group
- hll 101-9 Renato Sellani quartet
- hll 101-10 Johnny Griffin quartet
- hll 101-11 Franco Ambrosetti quartet
- hll 101-12 Teddy Wilson solo piano
- hll 101-13 Massimo Urbani trio
- hll 101-14 Enrico Rava quartet
- hll 101-15 Charlie Mariano quintet
- hll 101-16 Sal Nistico quintet
- hll 101-17 Various Artists various Jac's Anthology
- hll 101-18 Slide Hampton & Dusko Goykovich big band
- hll 101-19 Mal Waldron solo piano - Jazz a Confronto 19
- hll 101-20 Kenny Clarke quintet
- hll 101-21 Don Pullen quartet - Jazz a Confronto 21
- hll 101-22 George Adams / Pullen / Richmond, etc. quartet
- hll 101-23 Steve Grossman quartet
- hll 101-24 Enrico Pieranunzi trio
- hll 101-25 Dannie Richmond / Adams / Pullen, etc. group
- hll 101-26 Stafford James quartet
- hll 101-27 Archie Shepp - Jazz a Confronto 27
- hll 101-28 The Paris Quartet
- hll 101-29 Roy Haynes quintet
- hll 101-30 Gerardo Iacoucci solo piano
- hll 101-31 Roberto Della Grotta quartet
- hll 101-32 Lee Konitz quartet
- hll 101-33 L. Agudo & A. Vieira percussion
- hll 101-34 Valdambrini & Piana octet
- hll 101-35 Piero Umiliani
