= Lover Man (Archie Shepp album) =

Studio album by Archie Shepp Quartet featuring Annette Lowman
- Released: 1989
- Recorded: January 27, 1988
- Studio: Studio 44, Monster Holland
- Genre: Jazz
- Length: 60:00
- Label: Timeless; SJP 287
- Producer: Wim Wigt

Archie Shepp chronology
Duo Reunion (1987)	Lover Man (1989)	Body and Soul (1991)

Lover Man is an album by saxophonist Archie Shepp's Quartet with vocalist Annette Lowman which was recorded in Holland in 1988 and released on the Timeless label the following year.

== Reception ==
Professional ratings
Review scores
Source	Rating
AllMusic	4/5 stars

The AllMusic review by Steve Loewy said: "Shepp has been criticized for his more commercial ventures such as this, but many will enjoy its accessibly light charm. ... There is a touch of a blues and R&B feel that adds to the ambiance. Unlike some of Shepp's other ventures, there are no attempted serious statements made -- only relaxing, good, swinging jazz that lifts the spirits or touches the soul, if only just a bit".

== Track listing ==
1. "Stars Are in Your Eyes" (Archie Shepp) – 6:28
2. "Lover Man" (Jimmy Davis, Ram Ramirez, James Sherman) – 6:11
3. "Brand New World/Breaking a New Day" (Shepp) – 9:22
4. "Yesterdays" (Jerome Kern, Otto Harbach) – 5:38
5. "My Funny Valentine" (Richard Rodgers, Lorenz Hart) – 5:21
6. "Lush Life" (Billy Strayhorn) – 6:48
7. "Squeeze Me" (Fats Waller) – 6:17
8. "Margy Pargy" (Dave Burrell) – 5:18
9. "Tribute to Bessie Smith" (Shepp) − 8:37 Additional track on CD release

== Personnel ==
- Archie Shepp – tenor saxophone
- Annette Lowman – vocals
- Dave Burrell – piano
- Herman Wright – bass
- Stephen McCraven – drums
