= New Steps =

Studio album by Sun Ra Quartet
- Released: 1978
- Recorded: January 2 & 7, 1978; Horo Voice Studio, Rome
- Genre: Free jazz
- Length: 65:36
- Label: Horo; HDP 25–26
- Producer: Aldo Sinesio

Sun Ra chronology
Piano Recital: Teatro la Fenice, Venezia (1977)	New Steps (1978)	Other Voices, Other Blues (1978)

New Steps is a double album by jazz composer, bandleader and keyboardist Sun Ra and his Quartet recorded in Italy in 1978 and originally released on the Italian Horo label.

== Reception ==
The Allmusic review by Sean Westergaard awarded the album 4 stars. "New Steps is one of several albums done with this basic lineup in January of 1978. This album is billed to the Sun Ra Quartet, but it sounds like there's a bass player present on at least some of the cuts (it could be Ra, but he'd need three hands). There are two standards amongst a program of Ra originals, and things get started with a stellar version of "My Favorite Things." The music quickly takes its only sharp turn toward outer space as Ra introduces listeners to "Moon People," the only track where Ra emphasizes synthesizer over piano. "Sun Steps" is a slow tune featuring some beautiful piano playing from Sun Ra. In fact, the remainder of the album is on the mellow side ("When There Is No Sun" is the only track with vocals), and features some great statements by John Gilmore and Ra. Michael Ray is in fine form as well, if somewhat less exuberant than usual. With such a small group, solo space is ample, and Luqman Ali's understated drumming really holds things together nicely. Another fabulous release from Sun Ra".

Professional ratings
Review scores
Source	Rating
Allmusic	4/5 stars

== Track listing ==
All compositions by Sun Ra except as indicated

Side One:

1. "My Favorite Things" (Oscar Hammerstein II, Richard Rodgers) – 7:49
2. "Moon People" – 7:50

Side Two:

1. "Sun Steps" – 11:37
2. "Exactly Like You" (Dorothy Fields, Jimmy McHugh) – 6:04

Side Three:

1. "Friend and Friendship" – 6:58
2. "Rome at Twilight" – 5:08
3. "When There Is No Sun" – 4:37

Side Four:

1. "The Horo" – 15:33

== Personnel ==
- Sun Ra – piano, Crumar Mainman organ, vocals
- John Gilmore – tenor saxophone, percussion vocals
- Michael Ray – trumpet, vocals
- Luqman Ali – drums
