= Lörrach / Paris 1966 =

Live album by Albert Ayler
- Released: 1982
- Recorded: November 7 & 13, 1966
- Venue: Lörrach, Germany and Salle Pleyel, Paris, France
- Genre: Jazz
- Length: 65:20
- Label: HatHut hat MUSICS 3500
- Producer: Werner X. Uehlinger

Albert Ayler chronology
Live at Slug's Saloon (1966)	Lörrach / Paris 1966 (1982)	Albert Ayler in Greenwich Village (1966)

CD Reissue Cover

Lörrach / Paris 1966 is a live album by saxophonist and composer Albert Ayler, recorded in Europe in 1966 and first released on the Swiss hat MUSICS label in 1982. The album was remastered and rereleased on CD in 2002 with corrected track titles. The music was also reissued on a 2021 Hat Hut release titled Albert Ayler Quintet 1966: Berlin, Lörrach, Paris & Stockholm. Revisited.

== Background ==
The Lörrach and Paris recordings were made during Ayler's thirty-day 1966 European tour, which lasted from November 3 through December 2. The tour, which also included Berlin, Rotterdam, Stockholm, and Copenhagen, came about when Joachim-Ernst Berendt, director of the Berlin Jazz Festival, asked promoter George Wein to include Ayler's group in his annual festival tour. (John Coltrane had also been invited to participate, but declined due to health issues.) The Lörrach concert, which occurred on November 7, was presented in celebration of the tenth jubilee of the city's jazz club, while the Paris concert (November 13) was part of the Paris Jazz Festival. Henry Grimes and Sunny Murray were unable to participate in the tour, so Ayler asked bassist William Folwell and drummer Beaver Harris to join him. The group also included Ayler's brother Donald on trumpet and violinist Michel Sampson.

According to Ayler biographer Jeff Schwartz, the recordings show Ayler using a modular approach to his music, with thematic sections that can be reshuffled interspersed with improvisations, including brief solos by Harris and Folwell. Schwartz noted that the track titled "All" is actually the Pharoah Sanders tune "Japan" from his album Tauhid, and that Ayler's vocals on the European recordings are the first time he is heard as a singer. Schwartz also suggested that Ayler's singing can be heard as an extension of the moaning sounds that Sunny Murray emitted while playing the drums.

== Reception ==
Professional ratings
Review scores
Source	Rating
All About Jazz	4/5 stars
AllMusic	4.5/5 stars
The Penguin Guide to Jazz Recordings	3.5/4 stars
The Rolling Stone Album Guide	3/5 stars

AllMusic reviewer Thom Jurek states: "The two concerts presented on this disc represent two of the finest dates of Albert Ayler's European tour of 1966. The band was in fantastic shape and performed beyond expectation on both evenings. What is most noticeable about these dates and how they fill in a part of the Ayler mystique as a performer was to hear how immediately he would dictate a marching rhythm, theme, or folk song melody, or even perhaps a child ballad ... This is an amazing document, like the Hilversum sessions but better, because the sound is respectable here and matches the grandeur and shocking emotional immediacy of the performances".

The authors of The Penguin Guide to Jazz awarded the album 3 1/2 stars, and commented: "More than ever, Ayler sounds like a radical preacher, taking energy from the murmured 'Amen's and 'Praise God's of his fellow players, but basically ignoring them as he creates ever more intense harmonic rainbows across these deceptively childlike themes. This is perhaps a preacher speaking to children... who need everything told by example... They came and played their parts, leaving it to Albert out front to bring the congregation in. Magnificent."

All About Jazz writer Glenn Astarita said: "Nearly five decades have passed, and Ayler's invigorating sound-designs and idiosyncratic technique remain fresh and somewhat unparalleled after all these years".

Raul Da Gama, in a review of the Lörrach, Paris, Stockholm, and Berlin recordings, commented: "His music worships at the altar of originality. It is deep, prayerful and beyond musical; it is theological. It traverses the collective polyphony of New Orleans, wallows in the Mississippi Delta and roars with the freedom that Mr. Ayler had achieved long before he toured Europe, when Bernard Stollman first recorded him in the early sixties. His music is demanding and disturbing; beautiful and earth-shattering. It blazes through the rhythmic strategies of bebop, takes what it needs and then barks and thunders on the road to freedom. He plays many of the same music at various venues. Remarkably the basic structure—even the melodic content—remains the same, but his improvisations are fabulously new and awesome in the variations that he urged from his tenor saxophone. Naturally this affects the members of this group, which was by all accounts and purposes one of the most remarkable to ever accompany this genius."

Regarding the remastered 2002 CD reissue, Robert Spencer wrote: "I heard this recording many years ago and it had the limited range of an old audience recording; however, the transformation in this edition is nothing short of miraculous. The disc was remastered by Hat's crack engineer Peter Pfister in 2001, and the results are astounding. Talk about colors. I never had the privilege of seeing Albert Ayler in person, but I can hear this: Ayler with his brother Don Ayler (trumpet) and classical violinist Michel Samson forming a frontline of whirling dervish intensity, creating what Peter Niklas Wilson in his liner notes calls 'free spiritual music.' Glorious."

== Track listings ==
=== 1982 hat MUSICS LP release with original track titles ===
1. "Bells" - 13:10
2. "Jesus" - 6:50
3. "Our Prayer" - 6:00
4. "Spirits" - 3:05
5. "Holy Ghost" - 11:00
6. "Ghost (1st Variation)" - 7:35
7. "Ghost" - 4:25
8. "Holy Family" - 10:40

=== 2002 hatOLOGY CD reissue with corrected track titles, tracks 7 and 8 switched ===
Tracks 2, 3a, and 8b by Donald Ayler. Track 8a by Pharoah Sanders. Remaining tracks by Albert Ayler.

1. "Bells" - 13:30
2. "Prophet" - 7:00
3. "Our Prayer - Spirits Rejoice" - 6:25
4. "Ghosts" - 3:26
5. "Truth Is Marching In" - 11:24
6. "Ghosts" - 7:44
7. "Spiritual Rebirth - Light In Darkness - Infinite Spirit" - 11:06
8. "All - Our Prayer - Holy Family" - 4:45

Tracks 1–5 recorded live by South Western German Radio Network in Lörrach, Germany on November 7, 1966. Tracks 6–8 recorded live by Radio France/Sâlle Pleyel at Paris Jazz Festival on November 13, 1966.

== Personnel ==
- Albert Ayler – tenor saxophone
- Don Ayler – trumpet
- Michel Sampson – violin
- William Folwell – bass
- Beaver Harris – drums
