= The Cry of My People =

Studio album by Archie Shepp
- Released: 1973
- Recorded: September 25–27, 1972
- Studio: Allegro Sound Studios, New York City
- Genre: Jazz
- Label: Impulse!
- Producer: Ed Michel

Archie Shepp chronology
Attica Blues (1972)	The Cry of My People (1973)	There's a Trumpet in My Soul (1975)

Professional ratings
Review scores
Source	Rating
AllMusic	5/5 stars

The Cry of My People is an album by avant-garde jazz saxophonist Archie Shepp released in 1972 on the Impulse! label. The album features performances by Shepp with gospel singers, big bands, quintets, sextets, and chamber orchestras. The AllMusic review by Thom Jurek states: "Shepp worked with many larger ensembles as a leader, but never did he achieve such a perfect balance as he did on The Cry of My People".

== Track listing ==
All compositions by Archie Shepp, except as indicated

1. "Rest Enough (Song to Mother)" - 4:41
2. "A Prayer" (Cal Massey) - 6:29
3. "All God's Children Got a Home in the Universe" - 2:58
4. "The Lady" (Bob Ford) - 5:31
5. "The Cry of My People" (Massey) - 5:45
6. "African Drum Suite, Part 1" (Beaver Harris) - 0:35
7. "African Drum Suite, Part 2" (Harris) - 7:34
8. "Come Sunday" (Duke Ellington) - 9:30

- Recorded at Allegro Sound Studios, NYC, September 25–27, 1972

== Personnel ==
- Archie Shepp - tenor and soprano saxophone
- Harold Mabern, Dave Burrell - piano
- Charles McGhee - trumpet
- Charles Greenlee, Charles Stephens - trombone
- Cornell Dupree - guitar
- Ron Carter - electric bass
- Jimmy Garrison - bass
- Bernard Purdie - drums
- Beaver Harris - drums
- Nene DeFense, Terry Quaye - congas, percussion, tambourine
- Guilherme Franco - berimbau, Brazilian percussion
- Peggie Blue, Joe Lee Wilson - lead vocals
- Andre Franklin, Mildred Lane, Mary Stephens, Barbara White, Judith White - backing vocals
- John Blake, Gayle Dixon, Leroy Jenkins, Lois Siessinger, Noel DeCosta, Jerry Little - violin
- Patricia Dixon, Esther Mellon - cello
- Romulus Franceschini - conductor, arranger
- Cal Massey, Dave Burrell, Charles Greenlee - arranger, conductor
