= Duo Reunion =

1987 studio album by Archie Shepp and Horace Parlan

Studio album by Archie Shepp and Horace Parlan
- Released: 1987
- Recorded: May 5, 1987
- Studio: Studio 44, Monster Holland
- Genre: Jazz
- Length: 49:11
- Label: L+R; LR 45 003
- Producer: Wim Wigt

Archie Shepp chronology
Splashes (1987)	Duo Reunion (1987)	Lover Man (1991)

Horace Parlan chronology
Little Ester (1987)	Duo Reunion (1987)	Keep Your Hands Wide Open (1988)

Duo Reunion is an album by saxophonist Archie Shepp and pianist Horace Parlan which was recorded in Holland in 1987 and released on the L+R label.

== Reception ==
Professional ratings
Review scores
Source	Rating
AllMusic	3/5 stars

The AllMusic review by Ron Wynn said "One of the better, more moving sax/piano duos of the 70s reunite effectively".

== Track listing ==
1. "Sophisticated Lady" (Duke Ellington) – 7:47
2. "Cousin Flo" (Archie Shepp) – 5:10
3. "A Flower Is a Lonesome Thing" (Billy Strayhorn) – 8:42
4. "Call Me" (Copyright Control) – 6:44
5. "Pannonica" (Thelonious Monk) – 9:41
6. "When Lights Are Low" (Benny Carter) – 6:42
7. "Stardust" (Hoagy Carmichael) – 8:21

== Personnel ==
- Archie Shepp – tenor saxophone
- Horace Parlan – piano
