= Introducing Lee Morgan =

Studio album by Lee Morgan With Hank Mobley's Quintet
- Released: 1956
- Recorded: November 5 & 7, 1956
- Studios: Van Gelder Studio, Hackensack, NJ
- Genres: Jazz, hard bop
- Length: 36:15
- Labels: Savoy; MG 12091
- Producer: Ozzie Cadena

Lee Morgan chronology
Lee Morgan Indeed! (1956)	Introducing Lee Morgan (1956)	Lee Morgan Sextet (1956)

Introducing Lee Morgan is an album by jazz trumpeter Lee Morgan with Hank Mobley's quintet released on the Savoy label. It was recorded on November 5 and 7, 1956, and features performances by Morgan with Hank Mobley, Hank Jones, Doug Watkins and Art Taylor.

== Reception ==
The AllMusic review by Scott Yanow stated: "At the time Morgan (who was just 17) was very much under the musical influence of Clifford Brown although a bit of his own personality was starting to shine through". (Morgan, born in July 1938, was 18 years old when the album was recorded).

Professional ratings
Review scores
Source	Rating
Allmusic	3.5/5 stars
The Penguin Guide to Jazz	3/4 stars

== Track listing ==
1. "Hank's Shout" (Mobley) - 7:03
2. "Nostalgia" (Navarro) - 8:53
3. "Bet" (Watkins) - 7:56
4. "Softly, As in a Morning Sunrise" (Hammerstein, Romberg) - 2:29
5. "P.S. I Love You" (Jenkins, Mercer) - 4:22
6. "Easy Living" (Rainger, Robin) - 2:49
7. "That's All" (Alan Brandt, Haymes) - 2:43

Tracks 4-7 are played as a medley.

Recorded on November 5 (1, 3-7) and 7 (#2), 1956.

== Personnel ==
- Lee Morgan - trumpet
- Hank Mobley - tenor saxophone
- Hank Jones - piano
- Doug Watkins - bass
- Art Taylor - drums
