= New York Mary =

American jazz fusion group

New York Mary was an American jazz/rock fusion group, which released two albums on Arista/Freedom Records in 1976. A Piece of the Apple was produced by Michael Cuscuna and Don Elliot. It also features guitarist Gene Bertoncini.

== Discography ==
=== New York Mary ===
1. "New York Mary"
2. "South Philly Willy"
3. "Hip City Slicker"
4. "Feet First"
5. "Sunrise"
6. "Shooby"
- Bruce Johnstone: Baritone Sax, Alto Sax, Soprano Sax
- Rick Petrone: Bass, Electric Bass
- Joe Corsello: Drums and Percussion
- Allan Zavod: Keyboards
- Donald Hahn: Trumpet
- Tim Breen: Electric Guitar

=== A Piece of the Apple ===
1. "Rush Hour"
2. "Back to Being One"
3. "Midnight to Magic"
4. "Zoo Mouth"
5. "Mr. Mystery"
6. "Just as Long as We Have Love"
7. "(Walkin' Down) Greasy Street"
8. "Aftermath"
- Bruce Johnstone: Baritone Sax, Alto Sax, Flute
- Rick Petrone: Electric Bass, Phaser Bass
- Joe Corsello: Drums and Percussion
- Ron Friedman: Trumpet, Electric Trumpet, Flugelhorn
- Robert Aries: Electric Piano, Synthesizer
- Don Elliott Singers on Tracks 3,5 and 8
- Gene Bertoncini: Electric Guitar on Tracks 2,6 and 7
- Pete Levin: Clavinet And synthesizer on Track 1
