= Lee Morgan Indeed! =

Indeed!

Studio album by Lee Morgan
- Released: late 1956
- Recorded: November 4, 1956
- Studio: Van Gelder Studio; Hackensack, New Jersey
- Genre: Jazz
- Length: 38:10 (LP)
- Label: Blue Note; BLP 1538
- Producer: Alfred Lion

Lee Morgan chronology
Indeed! (1956)	Introducing Lee Morgan (1957)

Indeed! is the debut album by American jazz trumpeter Lee Morgan, recorded on November 4, 1956, and released on Blue Note later that year. The quintet features saxophonist Clarence Sharpe and rhythm section Horace Silver, Wilbur Ware and Philly Joe Jones.

== Reception ==
Professional ratings
Review scores
Source	Rating
AllMusic	3/5 stars

The AllMusic review awarded the album 3 stars.

== Track listing ==
=== Side 1 ===
1. "Roccus" (Silver) – 8:18
2. "Reggie of Chester" (Golson) – 4:55
3. "The Lady" (Owen Marshall) – 6:47

=== Side 2 ===
1. "Little T." (Byrd) – 8:23
2. "Gaza Strip" (Owen Marshall) – 3:56
3. "Stand By" (Golson) – 5:51

=== CD reissue bonus track ===
7. "Little T." (alternate take) – 8:07

== Personnel ==
=== Musicians ===
- Lee Morgan – trumpet
- Clarence Sharpe – alto saxophone
- Horace Silver – piano
- Wilbur Ware – bass
- Philly Joe Jones – drums

=== Technical personnel ===
- Alfred Lion – producer
- Rudy Van Gelder – recording engineer
- Reid Miles – design
- Francis Wolff – photography
- Leonard Feather – liner notes
