= Unity (Sun Ra album) =

Live album by Sun Ra Arkestra
- Released: 1978
- Recorded: October 24 & 28, 1977; Storyville, NYC
- Genre: Free jazz
- Label: Horo; HDP 19–20
- Producer: Aldo Sinesio

Sun Ra chronology
Taking a Chance on Chances (1977)	Unity (1978)	Piano Recital - Teatro La Fenice, Venezia (1977)

Unity is a live double album by jazz composer, bandleader and keyboardist Sun Ra and his Arkestra recorded in 1977 and originally released on the Italian Horo label.

== Reception ==
The Allmusic review by Michael G. Nastos awarded the album 4½ stars naming it "The Arkestra's best live album. Loaded with standards. Incredible musicianship".

Professional ratings
Review scores
Source	Rating
Allmusic	4.5/5 stars

== Track listing ==
All compositions by Sun Ra except as indicated

Side One:

1. "Yesterdays" (Jerome Kern, Otto Harbach) – 5:39
2. "Lightnin'" (Duke Ellington) – 2:37
3. "How Am I To Know?" (Jack King, Dorothy Parker) – 9:33
4. "Lights" – 5:42

Side Two:

1. "Yeah Man" (Fletcher Henderson) – 3:01
2. "King Porter Stomp" (Jelly Roll Morton) – 4:04
3. "Images" – 10:31
4. "Penthouse Serenade" (Val Burton, Will Jason) – 4:10

Side Three:

1. "Lady Bird/Half Nelson" (Tadd Dameron/Miles Davis) – 8:00
2. "Halloween" – 6:02
3. "My Favorite Things" (Oscar Hammerstein II, Richard Rodgers) – 6:00

Side Four:

1. "The Satellites" – 7:30
2. "Rose Room" (Art Hickman, Harry Williams) – 9:37
3. "Enlightment" (Hobart Dotson, Sun Ra) – 2:06

== Personnel ==
- Sun Ra – organ, Rocksichord
- Ahmed Abdullah, Michael Ray – trumpet
- Akh Tal Ebah – trumpet, vocals
- Craig Harris, Charles Stephens – trombone
- Vincent Chancey – French horn
- Emmett McDonald – bass horn
- Marshall Allen – alto saxophone, oboe, flute
- Danny Davis – alto saxophone, flute
- John Gilmore – tenor saxophone, clarinet, percussion
- Danny Ray Thompson – baritone saxophone, flute
- Eloe Omoe – bass clarinet, flute
- James Jacson – flute, bassoon, percussion
- Richard Williams – bass
- Luqman Ali, Thomas Hunter – drums
- Atakatune, Eddie Thomas – percussion
- June Tyson – vocals
