= Bruce Johnstone (musician) =

New Zealand-American musician (born 1943)

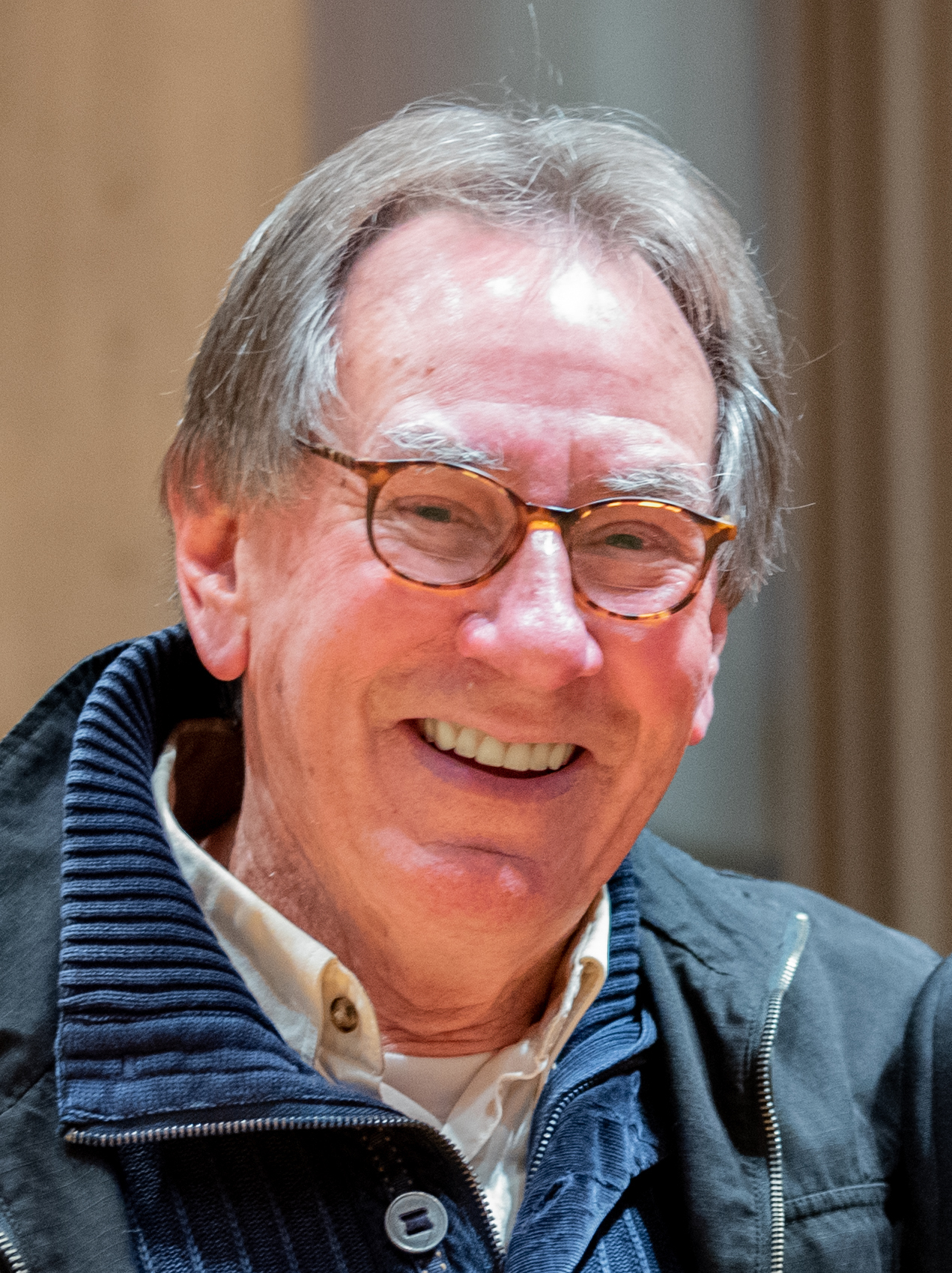
- Johnstone in 2019

Background information
- Born: September 1, 1943 (age 82); Wellington, New Zealand
- Genres: Jazz
- Instruments: Baritone saxophone, alto saxophone, bass clarinet, flute

Bruce Johnstone (born September 1, 1943) is a New Zealand-American jazz baritone saxophonist. He also plays alto saxophone, bass clarinet, and flute.

== Career ==
Born in Wellington, New Zealand, Johnstone was a member of Maynard Ferguson's band from 1972 to 1976, after having played in Denmark with Ben Webster and Dexter Gordon, and in London with Stan Kenton.

He regularly featured in Down Beat magazine's Readers' Poll behind Gerry Mulligan and Pepper Adams. In the mid-1970s, he was a founding member of the jazz-funk band New York Mary. In 1977, he joined the Woody Herman Band and toured and recorded with the band until April 1978. He taught at the State University of New York at Fredonia as the director of jazz studies for 15 years until 2016. During his last year at Fredonia performed in concert with trumpet player Arturo Sandoval. He has been a regularly scheduled player with the Buffalo Philharmonic Orchestra's jazz concerts for the past 20 years and has appeared on several of the orchestra's Grammy winning recordings. He has also been a featured soloist on Ken Poston's big band tribute concerts in Los Angeles.

== Personal life ==
Johnstone became an American citizen in 2003 and lives in Ripley, New York.

== Discography ==
=== As leader/co-leader ===
- 1976: New York Mary (Arista/Freedom)
- 1976: A Piece of the Apple (Arista/Freedom)

=== As sideman ===
With Maynard Ferguson

- 1973: M. F. Horn 3 (Columbia)
- 1974: Chameleon (Columbia)
- 1974: M. F. Horn 4 & 5: Live at Jimmy's

With Woody Herman

- 1978: Road Father (Century)
- 1978: Chick, Donald, Walter & Woodrow (Century)

With others

- 1975: Night Life – Luther Allison
- 1976: Creative Orchestra Music 1976 – Anthony Braxton
