= Saheb Sarbib =

- Birth name: Jean Henri Sarbib
- Born: 1944
- Genres: Jazz, avant-garde jazz
- Occupation: Musician
- Instrument: Double bass
- Years active: 1973–present
- Labels: Cadence, Soul Note, Marge

Saheb Sarbib (born 1944) is an American jazz double-bassist and bandleader.

== Career ==
Sarbib, born Jean Henri Sarbib, was raised in Europe. His father was Roger Sarbib, a French pianist and innovator of the big band style in Portugal in the 1940s and 1950s, who also played piano behind French singers such as Edith Piaf, Charles Trenet and Maurice Chevalier. From 1973–1977 Sarbib led his own ensembles in France; Daunik Lazro, François Jeanneau, Muhammad Ali, and Mino Cinélu were among those who played with him as sidemen. In Europe he performed with Cecil Taylor and Archie Shepp.

In 1977, Sarbib moved to New York City, where he led small groups and established the Saheb Sarbib Multinational Big Band, with sidemen including Roy Campbell, Jack Walrath, Art Baron, Talib Kibwe, Pete Chavez, Joe Ford, Jemeel Moondoc, Richard Baratta, Mark Whitecage, Dave Hofstra, Guilherme Franco, Booker T. Williams, and the saxophonist Joe Lovano. Paul Nebenzahl helped arrange his charts. Sarbib also performed with Paul Motian, Rashied Ali, Hal Galper and Kirk Lightsey in New York City nightclubs in the late 1970s.

Saheb also played double bass for saxophonist Archie Shepp including his 1984 album Down Home New York alongside Charles McGhee on trumpet, Kenny Werner on piano, and Marvin "Smitty" Smith on drums.

He collaborated with the Portuguese avant-garde ensemble Telectu, playing several times with the duo, including the first edition of the Festival de Jazz de Lisboa. In 1989 the group recorded Encounters II//Labirintho 7.8 with Saheb.

Sarbib disappeared from music in the late 1980s. He is an art and antique dealer in New York.

== Discography ==
=== As leader ===
- Evil Season (Un-Deux-Trois, 1975)
- Live in Europe Vol. 1 (Sasa, 1976)
- Live in Europe Vol. 2 (Marge, 1976)
- Encounters with Jorge Lima Barreto (Alvorada, 1979)
- Aisha (Cadence Jazz, 1981)
- Live at the Public Theater (Cadence Jazz, 1981)
- Live On Tour (Cadence Jazz, 1981)
- Seasons (Soul Note, 1982)
- It Couldn't Happen without You (Soul Note, 1984)

=== As sideman ===
With Archie Shepp

- Down Home New York (Soul Note, 1984)

With Telectu

- Encounters II / Labirintho 7.8 (Mundo Da Cancão, 1990)
