= Down Home New York =

Studio album by Archie Shepp
- Released: 1984
- Recorded: February 5, 6, 7 & 8, 1984
- Genre: Jazz
- Length: 41:47
- Label: Soul Note
- Producer: Giovanni Bonandrini

Archie Shepp chronology
Soul Song (1982)	Down Home New York (1984)	African Moods (1984)

Down Home New York is an album by the American jazz saxophonist Archie Shepp, recorded in 1984 and released on the Italian Soul Note label.

== Reception ==
The AllMusic review by Ron Wynn stated: "Archie Shepp was the picture of rebellion and anger in the 1960s, but he became the voice of swing, blues and classicism in the 1980s. Shepp displayed his penchant for honking R&B and soulful blues on this 1984 date".

Professional ratings
Review scores
Source	Rating
AllMusic	3/5 stars
The Penguin Guide to Jazz Recordings	2.5/4 stars

== Track listing ==
All compositions by Archie Shepp except as indicated

1. "Down Home New York" - 10:50
2. "'Round About Midnight" (Thelonious Monk, Cootie Williams) - 9:13
3. "May 16th" (Saheb Sarbib) - 9:06
4. "The 4th World" - 6:02
5. "Straight Street" (John Coltrane) - 6:36
  - Recorded at Classic Sound Studio in New York City on February 5, 6, 7 & 8, 1984

== Personnel ==
- Archie Shepp – tenor saxophone, soprano saxophone, voice
- Charles E. McGhee - trumpet, voice
- Kenny Werner – piano, voice
- Saheb Sarbib – bass, electric bass, voice
- Marvin "Bugalu" Smith – drums, voice
- Bazzi Bartholomew Gray - voice
