= Freedom Records =

American jazz record label (1970s)

- Parent company: Arista Records
- Founder: Alan Bates
- Distributors: Polydor Records; Transatlantic Records
- Genre: Jazz
- Country of origin: U.S.

Freedom Records was a jazz record label headed by Shel Safran and founded by Alan Bates as a division of Black Lion Records.

Individual recordings were distributed via Polydor Records and Transatlantic Records during the early 1970s before the company was bought by Arista Records with the imprint dubbed Arista/Freedom in 1975.

== Discography ==
- 1000: Albert Ayler & Don Cherry - Vibrations
- 1001: Marion Brown - Porto Novo
- 1002: Charles Tolliver - Paper Man
- 1003: Gato Barbieri & Dollar Brand- Confluence
- 1004: Randy Weston - Carnival
- 1005: Cecil Taylor - Silent Tongues
- 1006: Roswell Rudd - Flexible Flyer
- 1007: Andrew Hill - Spiral
- 1008: Oliver Lake - Heavy Spirits
- 1009: Stanley Cowell - Brilliant Circles
- 1010: Roland Hanna - Perugia
- 1011: Dewey Redman - Look for the Black Star
- 1012: Julius Hemphill - Coon Bid'ness
- 1013: Mal Waldron - Blues for Lady Day
- 1014: Randy Weston - Blues to Africa
- 1015: Frank Lowe - Fresh
- 1016: Archie Shepp - There's a Trumpet in My Soul
- 1017: Tolliver, Charles - The Ringer
- 1018: Ayler, Albert - Witches & Devils
- 1019: New York Mary - New York Mary
- 1020: Hampton Hawes - Live at the Montmartre
- 1021: Ted Curson - Tears for Dolphy
- 1022: Human Arts Ensemble - Under the Sun
- 1023: Hill, Andrew - Live At Montreux
- 1024: Oliver Lake - Ntu: Point from Which Creation Begins
- 1025: John Payne & Louis Levin - Bedtime Stories
- 1026: Randy Weston - Berkshire Blues
- 1027: Shepp, Archie - Montreux One
- 1028: Julius Hemphill - Dogon A.D.
- 1029: Rudd, Roswell - Inside Job
- 1030: Ted Curson - Flip Top
- 1031: Jan Garbarek - Esoteric Circle
- 1032: Stanley Cowell - Blues for the Viet Cong
- 1033: Stephane Grappelli - Parisian Thoroughfare
- 1034: Archie Shepp - Montreux Two
- 1035: New York Mary - Piece of the Apple
- 1036: Payne, John & Louis Levin - Razor's Edge
- 1037: Richard Teitelbaum and Anthony Braxton - Time Zones
- 1038: Cecil Taylor - Indent
- 1039: Human Arts Ensemble - Whisper of Dharma
- 1040: Miroslav Vitous - Miroslav
- 1041: Dudu Pukwana - Diamond Express
- 1042: Mal Waldron - Signals
- 1043: Hawes, Hampton - A Little Copenhagen Night Music
- 1900: Ornette Coleman - The Great London Concert
- 1901: Paul Bley - Copenhagen And Haarlem
- 1902: Braxton, Anthony - The Complete Braxton 1971
- 1903: Art Ensemble Of Chicago - Paris Session (The Spiritual and Tutankhamun reissued together)
- 1904: Marion Brown - Duets
- 1905: Taylor, Cecil - Nefertiti, the Beautiful One Has Come
- 1906: Dave Burrell - High Won-High Two

== See also ==
- List of record labels
