= Little Red Moon =

Studio album by Archie Shepp
- Released: 1986
- Recorded: December 11, 12 & 13, 1985
- Genre: Jazz
- Length: 44:57
- Label: Soul Note
- Producer: Giovanni Bonandrini

Archie Shepp chronology
California Meeting: Live on Broadway (1985)	Little Red Moon (1986)	Splashes (1986)

Little Red Moon is an album by the American jazz saxophonist Archie Shepp recorded in 1985 and released on the Italian Soul Note label.

== Reception ==
The Allmusic review by Scott Yanow awarded the album 2 stars, stating: "By 1985 Archie Shepp's tone on tenor had declined quite a bit from just a few years earlier.... Despite some good moments from the supporting cast, this is one to skip".

Professional ratings
Review scores
Source	Rating
Allmusic	2/5 stars
The Penguin Guide to Jazz Recordings	2.5/4 stars

== Track listing ==
All compositions by Archie Shepp except as indicated

1. "Little Red Moon" - 17:59
2. "Impromptu" - 4:00
3. "Naima" (John Coltrane) - 7:51
4. "Whisper Not" (Benny Golson) - 9:08
5. "Sweet Georgia Brown" (Ben Bernie, Kenneth Casey, Maceo Pinkard) - 6:59

- Recorded at Barigozzi Studio in Milano, Italy, on December 11, 12 & 13, 1985

== Personnel ==
- Archie Shepp – tenor saxophone, soprano saxophone, voice
- Enrico Rava - trumpet, flugelhorn
- Siegfried Kessler – piano, synthesizer
- Wilbur Little – bass
- Clifford Jarvis – drums
