= Marvin "Bugalu" Smith =

American jazz musician

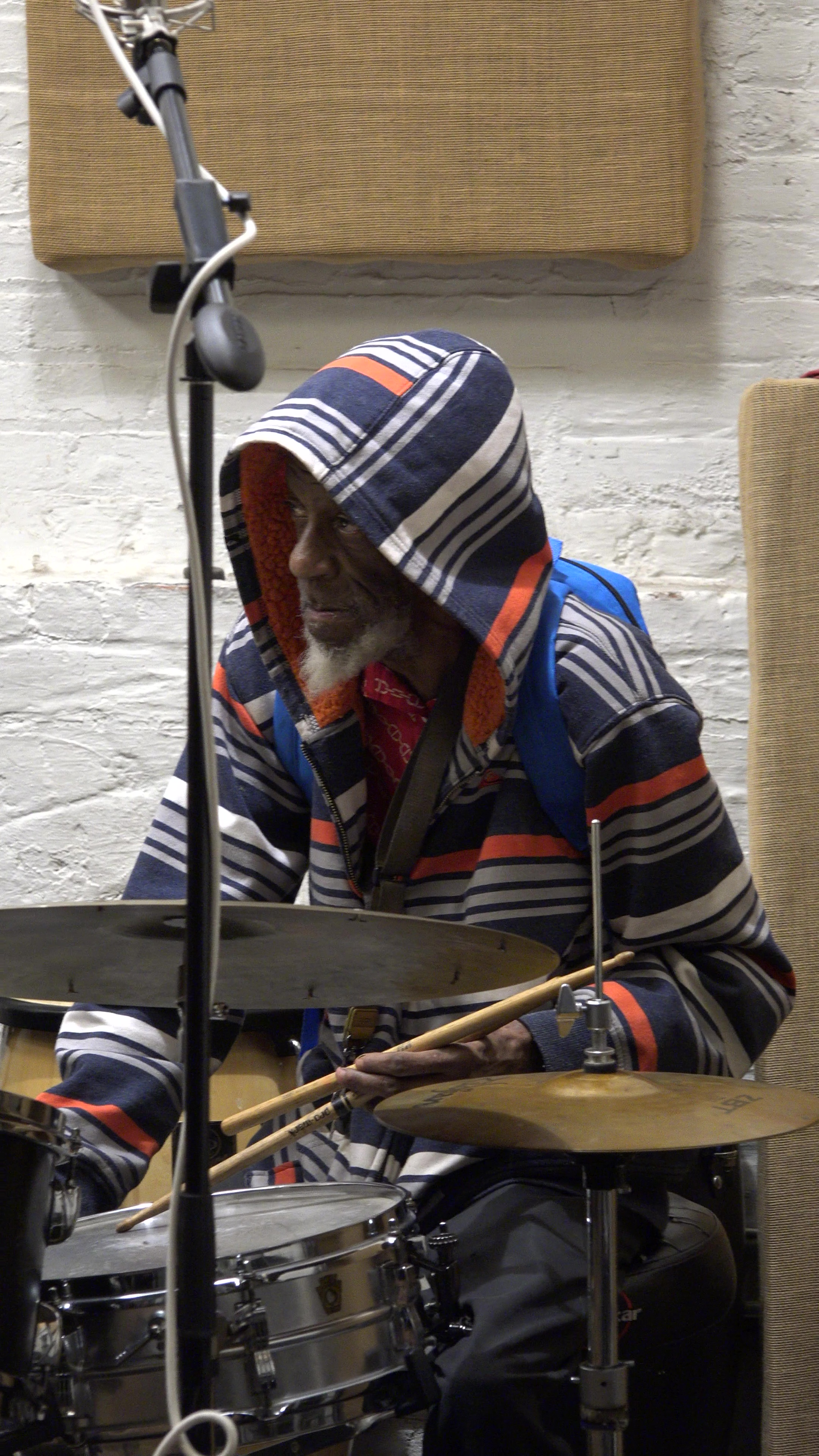
- in 2026 at iBeam in NYC

Background information
- Born: 1948 (age 77–78); Englewood, New Jersey, U.S.
- Genres: Avant-garde jazz, free jazz, experimental
- Occupation: Musician
- Instruments: Drums, percussion

Marvin "Bugalu" Smith (born 1948) is an American jazz percussionist best known for his work with Sun Ra and The Sun Ra Arkestra.

== Life ==
Smith was born in Englewood, New Jersey. The son of a carpenter, Smith had three other siblings. He began learning to play drums at age 2 and studied with Max Roach, Elvin Jones, Philly Joe Jones, and Art Taylor. He also learned from his older brother, Earl "Buster" Smith, who himself went on to play with Eric Dolphy.

Smith toured Italy with saxophonist Tyree Grimm Jr. eventually staying there for twenty years during which he also played with Rocky Roberts. While living in Italy, Smith became a Buddhist and its practices informed his drumming.

Smith played with Archie Shepp from 1982-1987 and then joined Sun Ra's Arkestra in 1987.

Having taken some well deserved time off in the 90's, Smith moved to the Hudson Valley in NY State and began accepting students. A demanding yet compassionate teacher, Bugalu went on to teach many drummers, influencing countless others. Smith was also the host of one of the longest running Tuesday night jazz jam sessions in all of NY, at the Terrace Lounge in Newburgh. Musicians from NYC and surrounding states would make this session legendary with Smith recording and posting every session on either YouTube or Vimeo. Every session would feature Bugalu and his hand picked musical guests playing the first set, then Bugalu would let his core group of students, referred to as "Bugalu's Drum Crew" (Andrew, Kesai, Jan, Douglas & Fitz) play the second set. This continued until 2012, when after returning from an Italian tour, Smith then focused on his studio and session work. He toured Italy again in 2015. Since 2017, Smith has been living in New York City and playing sessions and gigs all around NY and the tristate area.
