= Montreux Two =

Live album by Archie Shepp
- Released: 1976
- Recorded: July 18, 1975
- Venue: Montreux Jazz Festival, Montreux, Switzerland
- Genre: Jazz
- Label: Arista Freedom
- Producer: Michael Cuscuna

Archie Shepp chronology
Montreux One (1975)	Montreux Two (1976)	A Sea of Faces (1975)

Professional ratings
Review scores
Source	Rating
Allmusic	4.5/5 stars
The Rolling Stone Jazz Record Guide	3/5 stars

Montreux Two is a live album by jazz saxophonist Archie Shepp recorded at the Montreux Jazz Festival in 1975 and released on the Arista Freedom label.

== Reception ==
The Allmusic review by Scott Yanow states: "Tenor saxophonist Archie Shepp was at a turning point of sorts in 1975. He was near the end of his free jazz phase and would soon be exploring melodies from both the jazz tradition and the early 20th century; in addition, his tone would begin to decline within a decade. However, that is not in evidence during this fairly rousing live appearance at the Montreux Jazz Festival with his quintet.... This second of two CDs is the better of the pair and a good outing for Archie Shepp."

== Track listing ==
1. "Steam" (Archie Shepp)
2. "Along Came Betty" (Benny Golson)
3. "Blues For Donald Duck" (Archie Shepp)

- Recorded at the Montreux Jazz Festival, Switzerland, July 18, 1975.

== Personnel ==
- Archie Shepp - tenor saxophone
- Charles Greenlee - trombone
- Dave Burrell - piano
- Cameron Brown - bass
- Beaver Harris - drums
