= Montreux One =

Live album by Archie Shepp
- Released: 1976
- Recorded: July 18, 1975
- Venue: Montreux Jazz Festival, Montreux, Switzerland
- Genre: Jazz
- Label: Arista Freedom
- Producer: Michael Cuscuna

Archie Shepp chronology
There's a Trumpet in My Soul (1975)	Montreux One (1976)	Montreux Two (1975)

Professional ratings
Review scores
Source	Rating
Allmusic	4/5 stars
The Rolling Stone Jazz Record Guide	3/5 stars

Montreux One is a live album by jazz saxophonist Archie Shepp recorded at the Montreux Jazz Festival in 1975 and released on the Arista Freedom label.

== Reception ==
The Allmusic review by Scott Yanow states "Shepp, who was nearing the end of his free jazz period (soon he would be exploring hymns and traditional melodies) puts a lot of emotion into "Lush Life" and sounds fine on originals by Burrell and Greenlee in addition to his own "U-jamsa." [sic] A worthy effort".

== Track listing ==
1. "Lush Life" (Billy Strayhorn) - 12:40
2. "U-Jamaa" (Archie Shepp) - 10:22
3. "Crucificado" (Dave Burrell) - 11:43
4. "Miss Toni" (Charles Greenlee) - 11:57

- Recorded at the Montreux Jazz Festival, Switzerland, July 18, 1975

== Personnel ==
- Archie Shepp - tenor saxophone
- Charles Greenlee - trombone
- Dave Burrell - piano
- Cameron Brown - bass
- Beaver Harris - drums
