= There's a Trumpet in My Soul =

Studio album by Archie Shepp
- Released: 1975
- Recorded: April 12, 1975
- Studio: Sound Ideas Studio, New York City
- Genre: Jazz
- Label: Arista Freedom
- Producer: Alan Bates, Michael Cuscuna

Archie Shepp chronology
The Cry of My People (1972)	There's a Trumpet in My Soul (1975)	Montreux One (1975)

Professional ratings
Review scores
Source	Rating
Allmusic	3/5 stars
The Rolling Stone Jazz Record Guide	3/5 stars

There's a Trumpet in My Soul is an album by avant-garde jazz saxophonist Archie Shepp released in 1975 on the Arista Freedom label.

== Reception ==
The Allmusic review by Scott Yanow states: "Two vocals and a poem recitation weigh down the music a bit, although Shepp gets in some good licks. The overall results are not essential, but Archie Shepp was still in his musical prime at the time."

== Track listing ==
1. "There's a Trumpet in My Soul Suite Part 1: There's a Trumpet in My Soul/Samba da Rua/Zaid, Part 1" (Semenya McCord, Archie Shepp, Charles Greenlee) - 10:29
2. "Down in Brazil" (Roy Burrowes, Beaver Harris) - 10:06
3. "There's a Trumpet in My Soul Suite Part 2: Zaid, Part 2/It Is the Year of the Rabbit/Zaid, Part 3" (Greenlee, Shepp, Greenlee; poem: Bill Hasson) - 17:45

- Recorded in NYC, April 12, 1975

== Personnel ==
- Archie Shepp - tenor and soprano saxophone
- Roy Burrowes, Alden Griggs - trumpet, flugelhorn
- Charles Majid Greenlee - trombone
- Ray Draper - tuba
- Dave Burrell - piano
- Walter Davis Jr. - electric piano
- Brandon Ross - guitar
- Jimmy Garrison, Vishnu Bill Wood - bass
- Beaver Harris - drums
- Abdul Zahir Batin, Nene DeFense - percussion
- Bill Hasson - recitation
- Semenya McCord, Bill Willingham - vocals
