= Body and Soul (Archie Shepp album) =

Studio album by Archie Shepp
- Released: 1978
- Recorded: September 28 & October 16, 1975
- Genre: Jazz
- Label: Horo
- Producer: Aldo Sinesio

Archie Shepp chronology
A Sea of Faces (1975)	Body and Soul (1978)	Jazz a Confronto 27 (1975)

Body and Soul is an album by jazz saxophonist Archie Shepp recorded in Rome, Italy, on September 28 and October 16, 1975, and released on the Horo Records label.

== Track listing ==
1. "Body and Soul"
2. "Tropical"
3. "Dogon"
- Recorded in Rome, Italy, on September 28 (tracks 2 & 3), and October 16 (track 1), 1975

== Personnel ==
- Archie Shepp - tenor saxophone, soprano saxophone, piano
- Charles Greenlee - trombone
- Alessio Urso - bass (tracks 1 & 2)
- Afonso Vieira - drums (tracks 1 & 2)
- Cicci Santucci - trumpet (tracks 1 & 2)
- Irio De Paula - guitar (tracks 1 & 2)
- Dave Burrell - piano (track 3)
- David Williams - bass (track 3)
- Beaver Harris - drums (track 3)
