= Steam (Archie Shepp album) =

Live album by Archie Shepp
- Released: 1976
- Recorded: May 14, 1976
- Venue: Jazz Ost-West Festival, Nuremberg
- Genre: Jazz
- Length: 63:33
- Label: Enja
- Producer: Horst Weber, Matthias Winckelmann

Archie Shepp chronology
Bijou (1975)	Steam (1976)	Hi-Fly (1976)

Professional ratings
Review scores
Source	Rating
Allmusic	4/5 stars
The Rolling Stone Jazz Record Guide	4/5 stars
The Village Voice	A−

Steam is a live album by jazz saxophonist Archie Shepp recorded at the East-West Jazz Festival in Nuremberg, West Germany on May 14, 1976 and released on the Enja label.

== Reception ==
The Allmusic review by Scott Yanow states: "The avant-garde innovator Shepp still sounds pretty strong at what was for him a fairly late period, displaying his distinctive raspy tone and what were for him some typically emotional ideas".

== Track listing ==
1. "A Message from Trane" (Cal Massey) - 18:58
2. "Solitude" (Eddie DeLange, Duke Ellington, Irving Mills) - 11:40
3. "Invitation" (Bronisław Kaper, Paul Francis Webster) - 14:29 Bonus track on CD
4. "Ah-Leu-Cha" (Charlie Parker) - 8:06 Bonus track on CD
5. "Steam" (Archie Shepp) - 9:23
6. "52nd Street Theme" (Thelonious Monk) - 0:57

- Recorded at the East-West Jazz Festival in Nuremberg, West Germany on May 14, 1976

== Personnel ==
- Archie Shepp - tenor saxophone, piano
- Cameron Brown - bass
- Beaver Harris - drums
