= A Sea of Faces =

Studio album by Archie Shepp
- Released: 1975
- Recorded: August 4–5, 1975
- Studio: Phonogram Studios, Milan, Italy
- Genre: Jazz
- Length: 41:04
- Label: Black Saint
- Producer: Giacomo Pellicciotti

Archie Shepp chronology
Montreux Two (1975)	A Sea of Faces (1975)	Body and Soul (1975)

Professional ratings
Review scores
Source	Rating
AllMusic	2.5/5 stars
The Rolling Stone Jazz Record Guide	3/5 stars
The Village Voice	B+

A Sea of Faces is an album by avant-garde jazz saxophonist Archie Shepp recorded in Milan, Italy, on August 4 and 5, 1975, and released on the Italian Black Saint label. It features performances by Shepp with Charles Greenlee, Dave Burrell, Cameron Brown, Beaver Harris, Rafi Taha and Bunny Foy.

== Track listing ==
1. "Hipnosis" (Grachan Moncur III) – 26:10
2. "Song for Mozambique/Poem: A Sea of Faces" (Semenya McCord/Archie Shepp) – 8:12
3. "I Know 'Bout the Life" (Aishah Rahman, Archie Shepp) – 5:20
4. "Lookin' for Someone to Love" (Cal Massey) – 9:34
  - Recorded in Milan, Italy, August 4 & 5, 1975

== Personnel ==
- Archie Shepp – tenor saxophone, soprano saxophone, piano, vocals
- Charles Greenlee – trombone, tambourine, vocals
- Dave Burrell – piano
- Cameron Brown – bass
- Beaver Harris – drums, tambourine, vocals
- Rafi Taha – vocals
- Bunny Foy – vocals, maracas, percussion
