= California Meeting: Live on Broadway =

Live album by Archie Shepp
- Released: 1987
- Recorded: May 22, 1985
- Genre: Jazz
- Length: 40:53
- Label: Soul Note
- Producer: Giovanni Bonandrini

Archie Shepp chronology
The Good Life (1984)	California Meeting: Live on Broadway (1987)	Little Red Moon (1985)

California Meeting: Live on Broadway is a live album by the American jazz saxophonist Archie Shepp recorded in 1985 and released on the Italian Soul Note label.

== Reception ==
The Allmusic review by Scott Yanow awarded the album 3 stars stating "Archie Shepp recordings in the 1980s are hit and miss; this is one of the more interesting ones... Not essential but this CD is worth picking up by Archie Shepp's fans".

Professional ratings
Review scores
Source	Rating
Allmusic	3/5 stars
The Penguin Guide to Jazz Recordings	3.5/4 stars

== Track listing ==
1. "St. James Infirmary" (Traditional) – 7:20
2. "A Night in Tunisia" (Dizzy Gillespie) – 13:42
3. "Giant Steps" (John Coltrane) – 6:54
4. "My Romance" (Lorenz Hart, Richard Rodgers) – 12:27
  - Recorded at The On Broadway Bar & Cafe in Sacramento, California on May 22, 1985

== Personnel ==
- Archie Shepp – tenor saxophone, soprano saxophone
- George Cables – piano
- Herbie Lewis – bass
- Eddie Marshall – drums
- Royal Blue – vocals (track 1)
