= For Losers =

Studio album by Archie Shepp
- Released: July 1970
- Recorded: September 9, 1968; February 17, 1969; August 26, 1969
- Studio: RCA Studios, New York City
- Genre: Jazz
- Length: 37:34
- Label: Impulse! AS-9188
- Producer: Bob Thiele, Ed Michel

Archie Shepp chronology
The Way Ahead (1969)	For Losers (1970)	Kwanza (1974)

Professional ratings
Review scores
Source	Rating
AllMusic	2.5/5 stars
DownBeat	5/5 stars

For Losers is an album by Archie Shepp released on Impulse! in 1970. The album contains tracks recorded from September 1968 to August 1969 by Shepp with three different ensembles. The AllMusic review by Rob Ferrier states "for anyone wishing to understand the music and career of this brilliant musician, this is an undervalued piece of the puzzle".

== Track listing ==
All compositions by Archie Shepp, except as indicated.

1. "Stick 'Em Up" – 2:04
2. "Abstract" – 4:21
3. "I Got It Bad (And That Ain't Good)" (Duke Ellington, Paul Francis Webster) – 5:15
4. "What Would It Be Without You" (Cal Massey) – 4:05
5. "Un Croque Monsieur" – 21:49

Recorded September 9, 1968 (track 1), February 17, 1969 (track 2) and August 26, 1969 (tracks 3–5).

== Personnel ==
Track 1

- Archie Shepp – tenor saxophone, soprano saxophone
- Leon Thomas – lead vocals
- Martin Banks – trumpet, flugelhorn
- Robin Kenyatta – alto saxophone, flute
- Andrew Bey – piano
- Bert Payne – guitar
- Albert Winston – electric bass, bass
- Tasha Thomas, Doris Troy – backing vocals
- Beaver Harris – drums

Track 2

- Archie Shepp – tenor saxophone
- Jimmy Owens – trumpet
- Grachan Moncur III – trombone
- James Spaulding– alto saxophone
- Charles Davis – baritone saxophone
- Dave Burrell – organ
- Wally Richardson – guitar
- Bob Bushnell – electric bass
- Bernard Purdie – drums

Tracks 3–5

- Archie Shepp – tenor saxophone
- Woody Shaw – trumpet
- Matthew Gee – trombone
- Cedar Walton – piano
- Wilbur Ware – bass
- Joe Chambers – drums
- Clarence Sharpe – alto saxophone (3 and 5)
- China-Lin Sharpe – vocals (3 and 5)
- Cecil Payne – baritone saxophone, flute (4–5)
