= Soul Song (Archie Shepp album) =

Studio album by Archie Shepp
- Released: 1983
- Recorded: December 1, 1982
- Studio: Studio N, Cologne
- Genre: Jazz
- Length: 38:07
- Label: Enja; 4050
- Producer: Horst Weber and Matthias Winckelmann

Archie Shepp chronology
| Mama Rose (1982) | Soul Song (1983) | Down Home New York (1984) |

Soul Song is an album by saxophonist Archie Shepp recorded in 1982 for the Enja label.

== Reception ==
Professional ratings
Review scores
| Source | Rating |
|---|---|
| AllMusic | 2/5 stars |

Scott Yanow at AllMusic awarded the album 2 stars, stating: "This is one of Archie Shepp's more erratic sets ... due to this release's weak first half, it can be safely passed by".

== Track listing ==
All compositions by Archie Shepp except where noted.

1. "Mama Rose" – 15:17
2. "Soul Song" – 4:00
3. "Geechee" – 18:33
4. "My Romance" (Richard Rodgers, Lorenz Hart) – 7:17 Bonus track on CD release

== Personnel ==
- Archie Shepp – tenor saxophone, soprano saxophone, vocals
- Kenny Werner – piano
- Santi Debriano – bass
- Marvin Smith – drums
