= The Magic of Ju-Ju =

Studio album by Archie Shepp
- Released: May 1968
- Recorded: April 26, 1967
- Genre: Jazz
- Length: 35:18
- Label: Impulse!
- Producer: Bob Thiele

Archie Shepp chronology
Mama Too Tight (1967)	The Magic of Ju-Ju (1968)	The Way Ahead (1968)

The Magic of Ju-Ju is an album by Archie Shepp released on Impulse! Records in May 1968.

== Background ==
The album contains tracks recorded by saxophonist Archie Shepp, trumpeter Martin Banks, trombonist Mike Zwerin, bassist Reggie Workman and percussionists Norman Connors, Frank Charles, Dennis Charles, Ed Blackwell and Beaver Harris in April 1967. The album was a defining moment in Shepp's career, as he began transitioning into deeper explorations of gospel, blues, and contemporary RnB music. There is an African percussion ensemble in the back, a hint at Shepp's growing acknowledgment of his African heritage.

The title of the album is a reference to Vietnam-era G.I. slang, which hints at the deeper social and political meaning of the album. Jùjú is also a genre of music created by the Yoruba people of Lagos, Nigeria. The genre commonly incorporates elements of traditional Yoruba music with Western instruments and musical influences.

== Reception ==
Professional ratings
Review scores
Source	Rating
AllMusic	4.5/5 stars
DownBeat	3/5 stars
Austin Krentz	7.5/10
Pablo's Reviews	8/10
Rate Your Music Best Albums of 1968	55/1000
Rate Your Music Best Albums of All Time	3775/5000
The Rolling Stone Jazz Record Guide	3/5 stars

The AllMusic review by Al Campbell states of the title track "Shepp's emotional and fiery tenor takes off immediately, gradually morphing with the five percussionists who perform on instruments including rhythm logs and talking drums. Shepp never loses the initial energy, moving forward like a man possessed as the drumming simultaneously builds into a fury. Upon the final three minutes, the trumpets of Martin Banks and Michael Zwerin make an abrupt brief appearance, apparently to ground the piece to a halt. This is one of Shepp's most chaotic yet rhythmically hypnotic pieces".

== Track listing ==
All music is composed by Archie Shepp.

Side one
No.	Title	Length
1.	"The Magic of Ju-Ju"	18:37
Total length:		18:37

Side two
No.	Title	Length
1.	"You're What This Day Is All About"	1:51
2.	"Shazam!"	4:43
3.	"Sorry 'Bout That"	10:07
Total length:		16:41

== Personnel ==
Adapted from the vinyl pressing

- Archie Shepp – tenor saxophone
- Martin Banks – trumpet, flugelhorn
- Mike Zwerin – bass trombone, trombone
- Reggie Workman – bass
- Norman Connors – drums
- Beaver Harris – drums
- Frank Charles – talking drum
- Dennis Charles – percussion
- Ed Blackwell – rhythm logs
