= Mama Rose (album) =

Live album by Archie Shepp and Jasper van 't Hof
- Released: 1982
- Recorded: February 5, 1982
- Venue: SWF Jazz Concert Villingen, Black Forest, West Germany
- Genre: Jazz
- Length: 42:05
- Label: SteepleChase; SCS 1169
- Producer: Nils Winther

Archie Shepp chronology
Passport to Paradise: Archie Shepp Plays Sydney Bechet (1981)	Mama Rose (1982)	Soul Song (1982)

Professional ratings
Review scores
Source	Rating
AllMusic	4.5/5 stars
The Penguin Guide to Jazz Recordings	2/4 stars

Mama Rose (subtitled Live in Concert) is a live album by saxophonist Archie Shepp and pianist Jasper van 't Hof featuring a performance recorded in 1982 to celebrate the 20th anniversary of the Jazz Club Villingen and released on the Danish SteepleChase label.

== Track listing ==
All compositions by Jasper van 't Hof except where noted.

1. "Contracts" – 9:17
2. "Mama Rose" (Archie Shepp) – 12:03
3. "People" – 11:47
4. "Kalimba" – 3:39
5. "Recovered Residence" – 5:19

== Personnel ==
- Archie Shepp – tenor saxophone, soprano saxophone, recitation
- Jasper van 't Hof – piano, electric piano, organ, synthesizer, computer, kalimba
