= Attica Blues (album) =

Studio album by Archie Shepp
- Released: 1972
- Recorded: January 24–26, 1972
- Studios: A&R Recording, New York
- Genres: Jazz, post-bop, avant-garde jazz, big band, jazz poetry, funk
- Label: Impulse! AS-9222
- Producer: Ed Michel

Archie Shepp chronology
Things Have Got to Change (1971)	Attica Blues (1972)	The Cry of My People (1972)

Professional ratings
Review scores
Source	Rating
Allmusic	4.5/5 stars
DownBeat	4/5 stars
The Penguin Guide to Jazz Recordings	4/4 stars
Pitchfork	9.3/10
Rolling Stone	favorable
The Rolling Stone Jazz Record Guide	3/5 stars

Attica Blues is an album by avant-garde jazz saxophonist Archie Shepp. Originally released in 1972 on the Impulse! label, the album title refers to the Attica Prison riots.

== Reception ==
The AllMusic review by Steve Huey states: "Attica Blues is one of Shepp's most successful large-group projects, because his skillful handling of so many different styles of black music produces such tremendously groovy results". Stephen Davis of Rolling Stone said that it was "not just a masterpiece of protest: [...] it is more a politico/religious experience, an appeal to higher human consciousness to, for God's sake, help us out of this torment."

== Track listing ==
All compositions by Archie Shepp, except as indicated

1. "Attica Blues" (lyrics by Beaver Harris) – 4:49
2. "Invocation: Attica Blues" (Harris) – 0:18
3. "Steam, Part 1" – 5:08
4. "Invocation to Mr. Parker" (lyrics by Bart Gray) – 3:17
5. "Steam, Part 2" – 5:10
6. "Blues for Brother George Jackson" – 4:00
7. "Invocation: Ballad for a Child" (Harris) – 0:30
8. "Ballad for a Child" (lyrics by Harris) – 3:37
9. "Good-Bye Sweet Pops" (Cal Massey) – 4:23
10. "Quiet Dawn" (Massey) – 6:12

Recorded at A&R Recording, NYC, January 24–26, 1972 (Track timings slightly differ from one issue to another, due to merging tracks.)

== Personnel ==
- Archie Shepp - tenor saxophone (1, 6, 8, 10) and soprano saxophone (3, 5, 9)
- Brass and reed section on tracks 1, 6, 9 and 10
  - Clifford Thornton - cornet
  - Roy Burrows, Charles McGhee, Michael Ridley - trumpet
  - Charles Greenlee, Charles Stephens, Kiane Zawadi - trombone
  - Hakim Jami - euphonium
  - Clarence White - alto saxophone
  - Roland Alexander, Billy Robinson - tenor saxophone
  - James Ware - baritone saxophone
- String section on tracks 1, 3, 5, and 8–10
  - John Blake, Leroy Jenkins, Lakshinarayana Shankar - violin
  - Ronald Lipscomb, Calo Scott - cello
- Marion Brown - alto saxophone (1, 6), bamboo flute (3), flute (4), percussion (3–5)
- Walter Davis, Jr. - electric piano (1, 6), piano (6, 8–10)
- Dave Burrell - electric piano (3, 5)
- Cornell Dupree - guitar (1, 3, 5, 8)
- Roland Wilson (1, 3, 5–6, 8), Gerald Jemmott (1) - Fender bass
- Jimmy Garrison - bass (3–5, 9, 10)
- Beaver Harris (1, 3, 5–6, 8) - drums
- Ollie Anderson, Nene DeFense, Juma Sultan - percussion (1, 6, 10)
- Vocals
  - Henry Hull (1, 8), Joe Lee Wilson (3, 5) - vocals
  - William Kunstler (2, 7), Bartholomew Gray (4) - narrator
  - Joshie Armstead, Albertine Robertson - backing vocals (1)
- Featured exclusively on tracks 9 and 10, written by Cal Massey
  - Romulus Franceschini - conductor and co-arranger
  - Cal Massey - fluegelhorn (10)
  - Waheeda Massey - vocals (10)
  - Billy Higgins - drums
