= Mama Too Tight =

Studio album by Archie Shepp
- Released: July 1967
- Recorded: August 19, 1966
- Studio: Van Gelder Studio, Englewood Cliffs, NJ
- Genre: Jazz, avant-garde jazz, free jazz, hard bop
- Length: 37:43
- Label: Impulse!
- Producer: Bob Thiele

Archie Shepp chronology
| Archie Shepp Live in San Francisco (1966) | Mama Too Tight (1967) | The Magic of Ju-Ju (1967) |

Professional ratings
Review scores
| Source | Rating |
|---|---|
| AllMusic | 4.5/5 stars |
| The Penguin Guide to Jazz Recordings | 3.5/4 stars |
| The Rolling Stone Jazz Record Guide | 5/5 stars |

Mama Too Tight is an album by Archie Shepp released on Impulse! Records in 1967. The album contains tracks recorded by Shepp, trumpeter Tommy Turrentine, trombonists Grachan Moncur III and Roswell Rudd, tuba player Howard Johnson, clarinetist Perry Robinson, bassist Charlie Haden and drummer Beaver Harris in August 1966.

== Reception ==
The AllMusic review by Thom Jurek states: "Shepp had hit his stride here compositionally... lots of free blowing, angry bursts of energy, and shouts of pure revelry are balanced with Ellingtonian elegance and restraint that was considerable enough to let the lyric line float through and encourage more improvisation. This is Shepp at his level best."

== Track listing ==
Side 1
1. A Portrait Of Robert Thompson (as a young man)
Introducing
a) Prelude to a Kiss (Duke Ellington, Irving Gordon, Irving Mills)
b) The Break Strain-King Cotton (public domain)
c) Dem Basses (public domain) - 18:57
Side 2
1. Mama Too Tight - 5:25
2. Theme for Ernie (Fred Lacey) - 3:21
3. Basheer - 10:38

All compositions by Archie Shepp except as indicated

- Recorded at Van Gelder Studio, Englewood Cliffs, NJ, August 19, 1966

== Personnel ==
- Archie Shepp: tenor saxophone
- Tommy Turrentine: trumpet
- Grachan Moncur III: trombone
- Roswell Rudd: trombone
- Howard Johnson: tuba
- Perry Robinson: clarinet
- Charlie Haden: bass
- Beaver Harris: drums
