= Bijou (album) =

Live album by Archie Shepp
- Released: 1976
- Recorded: October 25, 1975
- Venue: Studio Palm, Paris
- Genre: Jazz
- Label: Musica
- Producer: Alain Boucanus

Archie Shepp chronology
U-Jaama (Unite) (1976)	Bijou (1976)	Steam (1976)

Professional ratings
Review scores
Source	Rating
Allmusic	(no rating)

Bijou is a live album by jazz saxophonist Archie Shepp recorded in Paris, France, in 1975 and released on the French Musica Records label.

== Track listing ==
All compositions by Archie Shepp

1. "Big Foot"
2. "Hommage a Sidney Bechet"
3. "The Inner City"
4. "A Little Tune"
  - Recorded in Paris, France, on October 25, 1975

== Personnel ==
- Archie Shepp – tenor saxophone, soprano saxophone, piano
- Arthur Jones – alto saxophone
- Zusaan Kali Fasteau – vocals
