= Kwanza (album) =

Studio album by Archie Shepp
- Released: 1974
- Recorded: September 9, 1968; February 17 and August 26, 1969; RCA Studios, New York City; February 26, 1969; National Recording Studios, New York City
- Genre: Jazz
- Label: Impulse! AS-9262
- Producer: Bob Thiele, Ed Michel

Archie Shepp chronology
For Losers (1969)	Kwanza (1974)	Live at the Pan-African Festival (1969)

Professional ratings
Review scores
Source	Rating
Allmusic	4.5/5 stars
The Rolling Stone Jazz Record Guide	3/5 stars

Kwanza is an album by Archie Shepp released on Impulse! in 1974. The album contains tracks recorded from September 1968 to August 1969 by Shepp with four different ensembles.

== Reception ==
The AllMusic review by Thom Jurek stated: "Kwanza may not be one of Shepp's better known recordings, but it is certainly one of his fine ones".

== Track listing ==
All compositions by Archie Shepp, except as indicated

1. "Back Back" - 5:45
2. "Spoo Pee Doo" - 2:38
3. "New Africa" (Grachan Moncur III) - 12:50
4. "Slow Drag" - 10:09
5. "Bakai" (Cal Massey) - 9:59

Recorded September 9, 1968 (track 2), February 17, 1969 (track 1) August 26, 1969 (track 4) and February 26, 1969 (tracks 3 & 5).

== Personnel ==
- Archie Shepp - tenor saxophone, soprano saxophone
- Martin Banks - trumpet, flugelhorn (track 2)
- Robin Kenyatta - alto saxophone, flute (track 2)
- Andrew Bey - piano (track 2)
- Bert Payne - guitar (track 2)
- Albert Winston - electric bass, bass (track 2)
- Beaver Harris - drums (tracks 2, 3 & 5)
- Leon Thomas - lead vocals (track 2)
- Tasha Thomas, Doris Troy - backing vocals (track 2)
- Jimmy Owens - trumpet (tracks 1, 3 & 5)
- Grachan Moncur III - trombone (tracks 1, 3 & 5)
- James Spaulding - alto saxophone (track 1)
- Charles Davis - baritone saxophone (tracks 1, 3 & 5)
- Dave Burrell - organ (track 1), piano (tracks 3 & 5)
- Wally Richardson - guitar (track 1)
- Bob Bushnell - electric bass (track 1)
- Bernard Purdie - drums (track 1)
- Walter Booker - bass (tracks 3 & 5)
- Woody Shaw - trumpet (track 4)
- Matthew Gee - trombone (track 4)
- Clarence Sharpe - alto saxophone
- Cecil Payne - baritone saxophone, flute (track 4)
- Cedar Walton - piano (track 4)
- Wilbur Ware - bass (track 4)
- Joe Chambers - drums (track 4)
