= The New Wave in Jazz =

Live album by Various
- Released: November 1965
- Recorded: March 28, 1965
- Venue: Village Gate, New York City
- Genre: Avant-garde jazz
- Length: 44:18 (LP); 73:34 (CD)
- Label: Impulse! Records
- Producer: Bob Thiele

The New Wave in Jazz is a live album recorded on March 28, 1965, at the Village Gate in New York City. It features groups led by major avant-garde jazz artists performing at a concert for the benefit of The Black Arts Repertory Theater/School founded by Amiri Baraka, then known as LeRoi Jones. The album was released on LP in 1965 on the Impulse! label, and was reissued on CD in 1994 with a different track listing.

== Background ==
On February 22, 1965, the day after the assassination of Malcolm X, Baraka held a press conference at which he announced plans to establish the Black Arts Repertory Theater/School (BARTS) in Harlem. According to Baraka, BARTS, which opened later that spring in a brownstone at 109 West 130th Street, would offer schooling in "acting, writing, directing, set designing, production, [and] management."

Poster advertising the March 28, 1965 concert at the Village Gate, New York City.

Baraka booked a March 28 concert under the name "New Black Music" for the benefit of BARTS, and also arranged for it to be recorded. A poster for the concert advertised $5 tickets and listed the participants as John Coltrane, Cecil Taylor, Archie Shepp, Betty Carter, Grachan Moncur, Albert Ayler, the Sun Ra Myth-Science Arkestra, and Charles Tolliver. Baraka recalled:

I knew the producer of Impulse, Bob Thiele, fairly well, having done liner notes for him, on the enormously important Live at Birdland album, for which I interviewed Trane in the little telephone-booth dressing room in the back. So Thiele liked the idea of doing an album dedicated to the avant-garde in black music, which he could then market as an anthology and as a sampler of albums he would bring out later. He called the album The New Wave in Jazz...

He added:

two artists that appeared at the concert were not included on the record, and this was a terrible loss, e.g., Sun-Ra and His Myth-Science Arkestra... plus singer Betty Carter, one of the most lyrically articulate jazz singers to show up in many moons.

Years later, Baraka noted that the concert and recording occurred at a time "when I had literally fled Greenwich Village for Harlem. So the album... marked the end of one epoch and the beginning of another." He also voiced a complaint: "After Thiele's death, Impulse added music that they hadn't released with this first date, removed my liner notes, obscured the album so they didn't have to pay me a producer's royalty." (The original LP release contained tracks by Coltrane, Ayler, Moncur, Shepp, and Tolliver, with one track per artist. The CD reissue omitted the Ayler track and added extra tracks by Tolliver and Moncur.)

== Reception ==
Professional ratings
Review scores
| Source | Rating |
|---|---|
| AllMusic | 4/5 stars |
| Record Mirror | 3/5 stars |

Not surprisingly, initial critical reaction was mixed. In January, 1966, DownBeat published an article titled "Two Views of the New Wave," consisting of a negative, two-star review by Gilbert M. Erskine followed by a glowing, five-star review by Bill Mathieu. While Erskine referred to Ayler's music as "a bizarre artifact," and described Coltrane's band as "skitter[ing] in chaos... with no collective point of reference," Mathieu wrote: "There is no moment on this record when the spirit falters," and depicted the album as "completely true... a set of definitive performances... Highly recommended."

Recent writers have maintained a more balanced perspective, commenting that the concert "brought together diverse voices from the experimental fringes of the jazz community, many of whom were entrenched in improvisatory methodologies that challenged traditional assumptions about jazz," while noting that the recording "served as a five-track sampler of some of the most adventurous jazz of the day." Given Coltrane's success, recognition, and respect within the jazz community, Lewis Porter stated that his appearance in the concert "seemed to validate the most daring music of the time."

The editors of AllMusic awarded the album 4 stars, with Ron Wynn calling the performances "intriguing," and Scott Yanow writing: "There is plenty of fire on the release ... Some of the performances are free and ferocious while other tracks are on the advanced side of bop. Over 30 years later the music still sounds adventurous and full of life." Chris May described The New Wave in Jazz as "gotta-have-it", and stated that the concert lineup was "New Thing royalty." He wrote: "The gang is pretty much all here and it sounds like it was a magic evening." Richard Brody included the Coltrane track in a playlist containing highlights from the saxophonist's live performances, noting that the album was one of the first Coltrane recordings he owned, and remarking: "fasten your seat belts."

== Track listings ==
=== LP release (Impulse! Records A-90, AS-90) ===
Side one

1. "Nature Boy" - 8:48 - John Coltrane (tenor saxophone) with McCoy Tyner (piano), Jimmy Garrison (bass), and Elvin Jones (drums); written by eden ahbez
2. "Holy Ghost" - 7:21 - Albert Ayler (tenor saxophone) with Donald Ayler (trumpet), Joel Freedman (cello), Lewis Worrell (bass), and Sonny Murray (drums); written by Albert Ayler
3. "Blue Free" - 6:43 - Grachan Moncur III (trombone) with Bobby Hutcherson (vibes), Cecil McBee (bass), and Bill Harris (drums); written by Grachan Moncur III

Side two

1. "Hambone" - 11:41 - Archie Shepp (tenor saxophone) with Marion Brown (alto saxophone), Fred Pirtle (baritone saxophone), Virgil Jones (trumpet), Ashley Fennell (trombone), Reggie Johnson (bass), and Roger Blank (drums); written by Archie Shepp
2. "Brilliant Corners" - 9:45 - Charles Tolliver (trumpet), James Spaulding (alto saxophone), Bobby Hutcherson (vibes), Cecil McBee (bass), and Billy Higgins (drums); written by Thelonious Monk

=== CD reissue (Impulse! Records GRD-137) ===
1. "Nature Boy" - 7:58 - John Coltrane (tenor saxophone) with McCoy Tyner (piano), Jimmy Garrison (bass), and Elvin Jones (drums); written by eden ahbez
2. "Hambone" - 11:48 - Archie Shepp (tenor saxophone) with Marion Brown (alto saxophone), Fred Pirtle (baritone saxophone), Virgil Jones (trumpet), Ashley Fennell (trombone), Reggie Johnson (bass), and Roger Blank (drums); written by Archie Shepp
3. "Brilliant Corners" - 9:50 - Charles Tolliver (trumpet), James Spaulding (alto saxophone), Bobby Hutcherson (vibes), Cecil McBee (bass), and Billy Higgins (drums); written by Thelonious Monk
4. "Plight" - 13:06 - Charles Tolliver (trumpet), James Spaulding (alto saxophone), Bobby Hutcherson (vibes), Cecil McBee (bass), and Billy Higgins (drums); written by Charles Tolliver
5. "Blue Free" - 6:48 - Grachan Moncur III (trombone) with Bobby Hutcherson (vibes), Cecil McBee (bass), and Bill Harris (drums); written by Grachan Moncur III
6. "The Intellect" - 24:04 - Grachan Moncur III (trombone) with Bobby Hutcherson (vibes), Cecil McBee (bass), and Bill Harris (drums); written by Grachan Moncur III
