= Beaver Harris =

American jazz musician (1936–1991)

- Born: William Godvin Harris; April 20, 1936; Pittsburgh, Pennsylvania, U.S.
- Died: December 22, 1991 (aged 55) New York City, New York, U.S.
- Genre: Jazz
- Instruments: Drums

William Godvin "Beaver" Harris (April 20, 1936 – December 22, 1991) was an American jazz drummer who worked extensively with Archie Shepp.

== Early life ==
Harris was born in Pittsburgh, Pennsylvania. Coming from an athletic family, he played baseball as a teenager for the Kansas City Monarchs (then part of the Negro American League) and was scouted by the Brooklyn Dodgers and New York Giants.

== Career ==
After serving in the United States Army, Harris began playing drums. In 1963, he moved to New York City and was encouraged to pursue a musical career by Max Roach. While in New York, he worked and/or toured with Marion Brown, Dexter Gordon, Albert Ayler, Joe Henderson, Freddie Hubbard, Clifford Jordan, Howard Johnson, Sheila Jordan, Lee Konitz, Thelonious Monk, Roswell Rudd, Sonny Rollins, McCoy Tyner, Sonny Stitt, Clark Terry, Chet Baker, Doc Cheatham and Larry Coryell among other musicians.

In addition, Harris founded a "world music" band and called it the 360 Degree Music Experience. The band included some of the most significant artists of the time, including Buster Williams, Hamiet Bluiett, Don Pullen, Jimmy Garrison, Ron Carter, Ricky Ford, and many others.

== Personal life ==
Harris and his wife, Glo Harris, had three children. Harris died of prostate cancer in New York at the age of 55.

== Discography ==
=== As leader ===
- From Rag Time to No Time (360, 1975)
- In: Sanity (Black Saint, 1976)
- African Drums (Owl, 1978)
- Beautiful Africa (Soul Note, 1979)
- Safe (Red, 1980)
- Negcaumongus (Cadence, 1981)
- Live at Nyon (Cadence, 1981)
- A Well Kept Secret (Shemp, 1984)
- Beaver Is My Name (Timeless, 1987)
- Thank You for Your Ears (Dizim, 1998)

=== As sideman ===
With Albert Ayler

- Albert Ayler in Greenwich Village (Impulse!, 1967)
- The Village Concerts (Impulse!, 1978)
- Lörrach / Paris 1966 (hat MUSICS, 1982)
- Jesus (Jazz Galore, 1981)
- Live in Europe 1964–1966 (Landscape, 1991)
- Stockholm, Berlin 1966 (hatOLOGY, 2011)

With Marion Brown

- Three for Shepp (Impulse!, 1967)
- Juba-Lee (Fontana, 1967)

With Roswell Rudd

- Everywhere (Impulse!, 1967)
- Numatik Swing Band (JCOA, 1973)

With Archie Shepp

- Archie Shepp Live in San Francisco (Impulse!, 1966)
- Mama Too Tight (Impulse!, 1967)
- The Magic of Ju-Ju (Impulse!, 1967)
- Life at the Donaueschingen Music Festival (SABA, 1967)
- The Way Ahead (Impulse!, 1968)
- Three for a Quarter One for a Dime (Impulse!, 1969)
- One for the Trane (Polydor, 1969)
- For Losers (Impulse!, 1970)
- Things Have Got to Change (Impulse!, 1971)
- Attica Blues (Impulse!, 1972)
- The Cry of My People (Impulse!, 1973)
- A Sea of Faces (Black Saint, 1975)
- There's a Trumpet in My Soul (Arista, 1975)
- Montreux One (Arista, 1976)
- Montreux Two (Arista, 1976)
- Jazz a Confronto 27 (Horo, 1976)
- À Massy - U-Jaama "Unité" (Uniteledis, 1976)
- Body and Soul (Horo, 1978)
- Steam (Enja, 1976)

With others

- Chet Baker and Lee Konitz, In Concert (India Navigation, 1982)
- Gato Barbieri, The Third World (Flying Dutchman, 1969)
- Larry Coryell, Toku Do (Muse, 1988)
- Larry Coryell, Major Jazz Minor Blues (32 Jazz, 1998)
- Charles Greenlee, I Know About the Life (Baystate, 1977)
- Vincent Herring, American Experience (Musicmasters, 1990)
- Stafford James, Jazz a Confronto 26 (Horo, 1976)
- Jazz Composer's Orchestra, The Jazz Composer's Orchestra (JCOA, 1968)
- Sheila Jordan, Confirmation (East Wind, 1975)
- Karin Krog, Archie Shepp, Hi-Fly (Compendium, 1976)
- Steve Lacy, Trickles (Black Saint, 1976)
- Ken McIntyre, Chasing the Sun (SteepleChase, 1979)
- Grachan Moncur III, Echoes of Prayer (JCOA, 1975)
- Massimo Urbani, 360º Aeutopia (Red, 1979)
- The Blue Humans, Live – N.Y. 1980 (Audible Hiss, 1995)
