= Wim Wigt =

Music manager

Willem (Wim) Wigt, (Utrecht, October 13, 1944) is a Dutch artist manager, promoter, producer and founder of the record label Timeless Records.

== Life and work ==
Born in Utrecht in 1944, Wigt went on to study non-western sociology at the Landbouwuniversiteit in Wageningen during the early 1970s. As member of the student union, he began organising jazz concerts in the local theatre and around town. The invited mostly American musicians requested Wigt to arrange more performances. With the help of fellow students, among them his later wife Ria Wigt, he started to develop small tours throughout the Netherlands and abroad. In 1974 Wigt decided to quit his studies and fully focus on his now thriving music business. In the years that followed, Wigt organised countless European tours with, to name a few, Art Blakey, Dizzy Gillespie, Charles Mingus, Chet Baker, Stan Getz, Lionel Hampton, Toots Thielemans, Dexter Gordon, Freddie Hubbard, Pharoah Sanders, Machito, Lonnie Donegan, Chris Barber, Acker Bilk, Ben Webster, Oscar Peterson. Next to he would on occasion organise events with Dionne Warwick, Chuck Berry, The Hollies, Alan Parsons, Buddy Guy, B.B. King, Dave Brubeck, Sarah Vaughan, Chick Corea, Keith Jarrett, George Benson, Nina Simone, André Rieu and many others.

As a result, Wigt became a prominent figure and pioneer on the international jazz scene. Very often introducing well known American jazz musicians for the first time in different European countries. Even extending tours as far as behind the then Iron Curtain, the Balkan peninsula, South Africa, Oceania and Japan. In 1981 he aided in the founding the renowned jazz club New Morning in Paris. Wigt was highly influential in the programming of the North Sea Jazz Festival during their early years. Due to a disagreement with festival director Paul Acket, Wigt started the Camel Jazz Festival in the Concertgebouw in Amsterdam in 1984, to counterpart the well-known jazz festival (at that time) in The Hague. In 1988 Wigt was manager of Chet Baker during the time of his tragic death in Amsterdam. Since the 1990s Wigt started to, next to the jazz and blues music, also book other live entertainment such as musicals, dance and circus shows. Prominent artists such as ex-Rolling Stones bass player Bill Wyman, guitar virtuoso Tommy Emmanuel and tradjazz legend Chris Barber entrust Wigt for years to look after the business side of their European tours. In April 2026, Wim and his wife Ria Wigt were Royally appointed Knights in the Order of Orange-Nassau for their significant contribution to the international jazz world.

== Timeless Records ==
In 1975, Wigt and his wife Ria Wigt, established the record label Timeless Records. The very first release on the label was Eastern Rebellion by Cedar Walton. It is seen by many international jazz experts as one of the best bebop jazz records of the 1970s. In 1983, the Timeless release of Machito and his Salsa Big Band, with Wigt as producer, won a Grammy Award in the category Best Latin Recording. The current catalogue holds more than 850 releases, including several from Chet Baker, Art Blakey, Dizzy Gillespie, Lionel Hampton, McCoy Tyner, Bill Evans, Pharoah Sanders, Archie Shepp, Tommy Flanagan, Chris Barber, Acker Bilk and the Dutch Swing College Band. In 1991 Wigt starts, together with trombone player Chris Barber, the series Chris Barber Collection (also called Timeless Historical or abbreviated CBC), which are remastered reissues of recordings of Louis Armstrong, Bing Crosby, Coleman Hawkins, Ethel Waters, Django Reinhardt, Hoagy Carmichael, Sidney Bechet, Bix Beiderbecke and others. In 1998 Wigt buys Limetree Records which includes recordings of Toots Thielemans, Ben Webster, Monty Alexander and Bill Evans.
