= Joe Lee Wilson =

American singer

- Born: December 22, 1935; Bristow, Oklahoma, U.S.
- Died: July 17, 2011 (aged 75) Brighton, England
- Genres: Jazz
- Occupation: Singer

Joe Lee Wilson (December 22, 1935 – July 17, 2011) was an American jazz singer from Bristow, Oklahoma, who lived in Europe after 1977.

== Biography ==
Part African-American and part Creek Native American, Wilson was born in Bristow, Oklahoma, to farming parents Stella and Ellis Wilson.

As his band's name, Joy of Jazz, suggests, Wilson's baritone personified the life-affirming nature of jazz and blues. Seeing Billie Holiday perform in 1951 began his interest in a music-industry career. Moving to Los Angeles at the age of 15, he went to Los Angeles High School, where he majored in music and sang in an a cappella choir. Graduating with honors in 1954, he won a scholarship to the Los Angeles Conservatory of Music, where he studied opera, leaving after a year and then attending Los Angeles Junior College. He began singing with local bands in 1958 and toured the West Coast, where he sat in with Sarah Vaughan, and down to Mexico. Relocating to New York in 1962, he worked with Sonny Rollins, Lee Morgan, Miles Davis, Pharoah Sanders, Freddie Hubbard, and Jackie McLean. During the 1970s, Wilson operated a jazz performance loft in New York's NoHo district known as the Ladies' Fort at 2 Bond Street. His regular band, Joe Lee Wilson Plus 5, featured the alto saxophonist Monty Waters (from Modesto, California) and for several years the Japanese guitarist Ryo Kawasaki, before the latter left to lead his own group. Archie Shepp and Eddie Jefferson were frequent collaborators at these sessions.

He also sang with Eddie Jefferson, Freddie Hubbard, and Kenny Dorham.

Wilson had a minor radio hit from a live radio recording he did on a radio program hosted by Sharif Abdus-Salaam (né Ed Michael) at WKCR-FM, Columbia University, on July 16, 1972. The live shot was released as an album, Livin' High Off Nickels & Dimes, on the short-lived Oblivion Records in New York. Wilson's rendition of Norman Mapp's "Jazz Ain't Nothing But Soul" was a radio hit on New York jazz radio in 1975.

In 1977 he and his English wife Jill Christopher moved to Europe. While based in Paris, Tokyo, and the United Kingdom (for a time living in the London flat of Val Wilmer, before settling in Brighton, Sussex), he recorded regularly with the American pianist Kirk Lightsey, including the Candid recording Feelin' Good. One of Wilson's last albums was an Italian recording with Riccardo Arrighini and Gianni Basso, Ballads for Trane (Philology W707.2).

Wilson was inducted into the Oklahoma Jazz Hall of Fame in November 2010, where he gave his last public performance. Having had heart surgery in 2009, he died of congestive heart failure at his Brighton home in 2011, aged 75.

Wilson is the subject of a documentary film, Around Joe Lee, by Yves Breux and Brad Scott.

== Discography ==
=== As leader ===
- The Great City (Powertree, 1964)
- Livin' High Off Nickels and Dimes (Oblivion, 1974)
- What Would It Be Without You (Survival, 1975)
- Shout for Trane (Trio/Whynot, 1976)
- Secrets from the Sun (Inner City, 1977)
- Without a Song (Inner City, 1978)
- The Shadow (Cheetah, 1990)
- Feelin' Good! (Big City, 2001)
- Come and See with Jimmy Ponder (Explore, 2007)

=== As sideman ===
With Clifford Jordan

- Inward Fire (Muse, 1978)

With Mtume

- Alkebu-Lan - The Land of the Blacks (1972)

With Archie Shepp

- Things Have Got to Change (1971)
- Attica Blues (1972)
- The Cry of My People (1972)
- A Touch of the Blues (Fluid, 1977)
