= Cal Massey =

American jazz trumpeter and composer (1928–1972)

Cal Massey

Calvin "Cal" Massey (January 11, 1928 – October 25, 1972) was an American jazz trumpeter and composer.

== Early life ==
Born in Philadelphia, Pennsylvania, United States, Massey studied trumpet under Freddie Webster, and following this played in the big bands of Jay McShann, Jimmy Heath, and Billie Holiday. After that he mainly worked as a composer. Growing up, Massey had two cousins in the Philadelphia area who were, like him, interested in jazz and the arts. Massey's cousin Bill Massey, also a jazz trumpet player, composed music for and played on several Prestige recording sessions for alto saxophonist Sonny Stitt in the early 1950s. His cousin Calvin L. Massey (1926–2019), brother of Bill Massey, was also known professionally as Cal Massey and worked as a jazz pianist in the 1960s before becoming a visual artist. Calvin L. Massey worked as monument designer (with sculptures at Valley Forge and Ellis Island) and illustrator at Marvel Comics, and later was an independent painter and sculptor.

== Career ==
In the mid-1950s, Massey led an ensemble in Philadelphia with Jimmy Garrison, McCoy Tyner, and Tootie Heath. On occasion, guests including John Coltrane and Donald Byrd played with Massey's group. According to jazz researcher Fred Ho, after his move to Brooklyn, Massey put together a new group. Tenor saxophonist Roland Alexander told Ho that the group included Alexander and Massey on saxophone and trumpet, with Sadik Hakim on piano, Roy Standard on bass, and Scoby Stroman on drums. "The band worked such Brooklyn clubs as the Moulin Rouge, The Turbo Village, and The Coronet. The band never worked outside of Brooklyn, according to Alexander. Massey in this period would occasionally do concerts with Sonny Stitt and Coltrane in Philadelphia. Alexander believed that the Brooklyn quartet worked for two or three years." However, Ho writes that according to Massey's wife Charlotte, "they often lived at the edge of poverty. Massey earned most of his money not from performing but from the many arrangements he wrote for local bands and singers."

In the 1950s, he gradually receded from active performance and concentrated on composition; his works were recorded by Coltrane, Tyner, Freddie Hubbard, Jackie McLean, Lee Morgan, Philly Joe Jones, Horace Tapscott and Archie Shepp. Massey played and toured with Shepp from 1969 until 1972. He also performed in The Romas Orchestra with Romulus Franceschini.

Massey died from a heart attack at the age of 44 in New York City, New York. His son, Zane Massey (born 1957), is also a jazz musician.

== Political life ==
Massey's political standpoint was radical and his work is strongly connected with the Civil Rights Movement of the 1960s and '70s. The Black Panther Party were an inspiration for The Black Liberation Movement Suite which he created with Franceschini. The Suite was performed three times at Black Panther benefit concerts. Massey's ideology resulted in him getting blacklisted (or "whitelisted" according to Fred Ho) from major recording companies and only one album was recorded under his name.

== Compositions recorded by other artists ==
The following is a partial list of Massey compositions recorded by jazz musicians during Massey's lifetime. It is not a comprehensive list of recordings of Massey's works.

=== Recorded by John Coltrane ===
- "Bakai" - Coltrane
- "Nakatini Serenade" - The Believer
- "The Damned Don't Cry" - Africa/Brass
- "Nakatine Serenade" - First Impulse: The Creed Taylor Collection 50th Anniversary

=== Recorded by Freddie Hubbard ===
- "Assunta" - Here to Stay
- "Father and Son" - Here to Stay

=== Recorded by Lee Morgan ===
- "These Are Soulful Days" - Lee-Way
- "Nakatini Suite" - Lee-Way
- "The Cry of My People" - The Sixth Sense
- "A Pilgrim's Funny Farm" - The Rajah
- "A Baby's Smile" - Caramba!
- "Taru, What's Wrong with You?" - Taru

=== Recorded by Cedar Walton ===
- "Lady Charlotte" - Spectrum
- "Quiet Dawn" - Soul Cycle

=== Recorded by Jackie McLean ===
- "Message from Trane" - Demon's Dance
- "Toyland" - Demon's Dance

=== Recorded by Archie Shepp ===
- "Pitchin' Can" - Pitchin Can
- "What Would It Be Without You" - For Losers
- "Dr. King, The Peaceful Warrior" - Things Have Got to Change
- "Things Have Got to Change" (Parts 1 and 2) - Things Have Got to Change
- "Good Bye Sweet Pops" - Attica Blues
- "Quiet Dawn" - Attica Blues
- "A Prayer" - The Cry of My People
- "The Cry of My People" - The Cry of My People
- "Bakai" - Kwanza
- "Looking For Someone To Love" - A Sea Of Faces
- A Message From Trane - Steam
- "What Would It Be Without You" - Parisian Concert - Vol. 2
- "Things Have Got to Change" - Things Have Got to Change: Live at the Totem, Vol. 1
- "The Cry of My People" - I Hear The Sound
- "Quiet Dawn" - I Hear The Sound
- "Goodbye Sweet Pops" - I Hear The Sound

=== Others ===
- "Fiesta" - Charlie Parker, The Genius Of Charlie Parker, #6 - Fiesta / Bird: The Complete Charlie Parker on Verve
- "Trinidad" - Herbie Mann and Charlie Rouse, Just Wailin'
- "Trinidad" - Mal Waldron Sextet, Blue Echo
- "Honey, I'm In Love With You" - Molly Bee, Young Romance
- "Fiesta" - Philly Joe Jones, Blues for Dracula
- "I Thought I'd Let You Know" - Shirley Scott, Like Cozy
- "Funky London" - Houston Person, Blue Odyssey
- "I Thought I'd Let You Know" - McCoy Tyner, Expansions
- "What Would It Be Without You" - Joe Lee Wilson and Bond Street, What Would Be Without You
- "Bakai" - Albert "Tootie" Heath, Philadelphia Beat

== Music written for theatrical productions ==
- Lady Day: A Musical Tragedy, a musical play, several songs (Massey's last work)

== Tribute album ==
- The Music of Cal Massey: A Tribute, recorded by Fred Ho, Quincy Saul and the Green Monster Band

== Discography ==
=== As leader ===
- Blues to Coltrane, recorded by the Candid label on January 13, 1961 at Nola Penthouse Sound Studio in New York City. First released in 1987, and again in 2006, features Massey on trumpet. All the compositions on the album are by Massey; it was the only album recorded under Massey's name.

Other musicians on the album are:

- Julius Watkins, French horn
- Patti Bown, piano
- Jimmy Garrison, bass
- Hugh Brodie, tenor saxophone
- G. T. Hogan, drums

=== As sideman/arranger ===
With George Shearing

- Satin Brass (Capitol Records, 1960)

With John Coltrane

- Africa/Brass (Impulse! Records, 1961)

With Archie Shepp

- Things Have Got To Change (Impulse! Records, 1971)
- Attica Blues (Impulse! Records, 1971)
- The Cry of My People (Impulse Records, 1973)

With Sonny Stitt

- Kaleidoscope (Prestige Records, 1957)
