= Charles Greenlee (musician) =

American jazz trombonist

Charles "Majeed" or "Majid" Greenlee (April or May 24, 1927 – January 23, 1993) was an American jazz trombonist who worked extensively with Archie Shepp.

Greenlee played mellophone, drums, and baritone horn in his youth, and got his early experience playing locally in Detroit. He played with Lucky Millinder and Benny Carter in the early 1940s, then with Dizzy Gillespie (1946, 1949–51). He also led his own bands around this time, working with Frank Foster and Tommy Flanagan. Late in the 1940s he converted to Islam, changing his name to Harneefan Majeed; he continued to use Charles Greenlee for professional purposes, though he is sometimes credited with his Muslim last name.

After spending some time on the hard bop scene in the early 1950s, with Gene Ammons among others, Greenlee essentially quit music from 1951 to 1957. He returned to play with Yusef Lateef (1957) and Maynard Ferguson (1959).

His lone album as leader features Alden Griggs, Charles Sullivan (tp) Suliman Hakim (as, fl) Archie Shepp (ts, ss) James Ware (bars) Hubert Eaves III (p) Buster Williams (b) Charlie Persip(d) Neil Clarke (per, cga) Jean Carn, Joe Lee Wilson (vo)

His composition "Miss Toni" appears on the Eric Dolphy album Outward Bound.

== Discography ==
=== As leader ===
- 1977: I Know About the Life (Baystate)

=== As sideman ===
With Archie Shepp

- Attica Blues
- There's a Trumpet in My Soul
- Montreux One
- Montreux Two
- A Sea of Faces
- Body and Soul
- Jazz a Confronto 27
- Mariamar
- U-Jaama (Unite)

With Roland Kirk

- Reeds & Deeds (Mercury)
- The Roland Kirk Quartet Meets the Benny Golson Orchestra (Mercury)

With John Coltrane

- Africa/Brass (Impulse!)
