= Grammy Award for Best Jazz Performance =

Grammy award category for jazz

- Awarded for: quality performances in the jazz music genre
- Country: United States
- Presented by: National Academy of Recording Arts and Sciences
- First award: 1959
- Currently held by: Chick Corea, Christian McBride & Brian Blade, "Windows - Live" (2026)
- Website: grammy.com

The Grammy Award for Best Jazz Performance has been awarded since 1959. Before 1979 the award title did not specify instrumental performances and was presented for instrumental or vocal performances. The award has had several minor name changes:

- In 1959 the award was known as Best Jazz Performance, Individual
- In 1960 it was awarded as Best Jazz Performance - Soloist
- From 1961 to 1971 the award was combined with the Grammy Award for Best Jazz Instrumental Album, Individual or Group
- From 1972 to 1978 it was awarded as Best Jazz Performance by a Soloist
- From 1979 to 1988 it was awarded as Best Jazz Instrumental Performance, Soloist
- From 1989 to 1990 it was awarded as Best Jazz Instrumental Performance Soloist (on a jazz recording)
- In 1991 it was awarded as Best Jazz Instrumental Performance, Soloist
- From 1992 to 2008 it was awarded as Best Jazz Instrumental Solo
- From 2009 to 2023, it was awarded as Best Improvised Jazz Solo
- Since 2024, it has been awarded as Best Jazz Performance

== Recipients ==
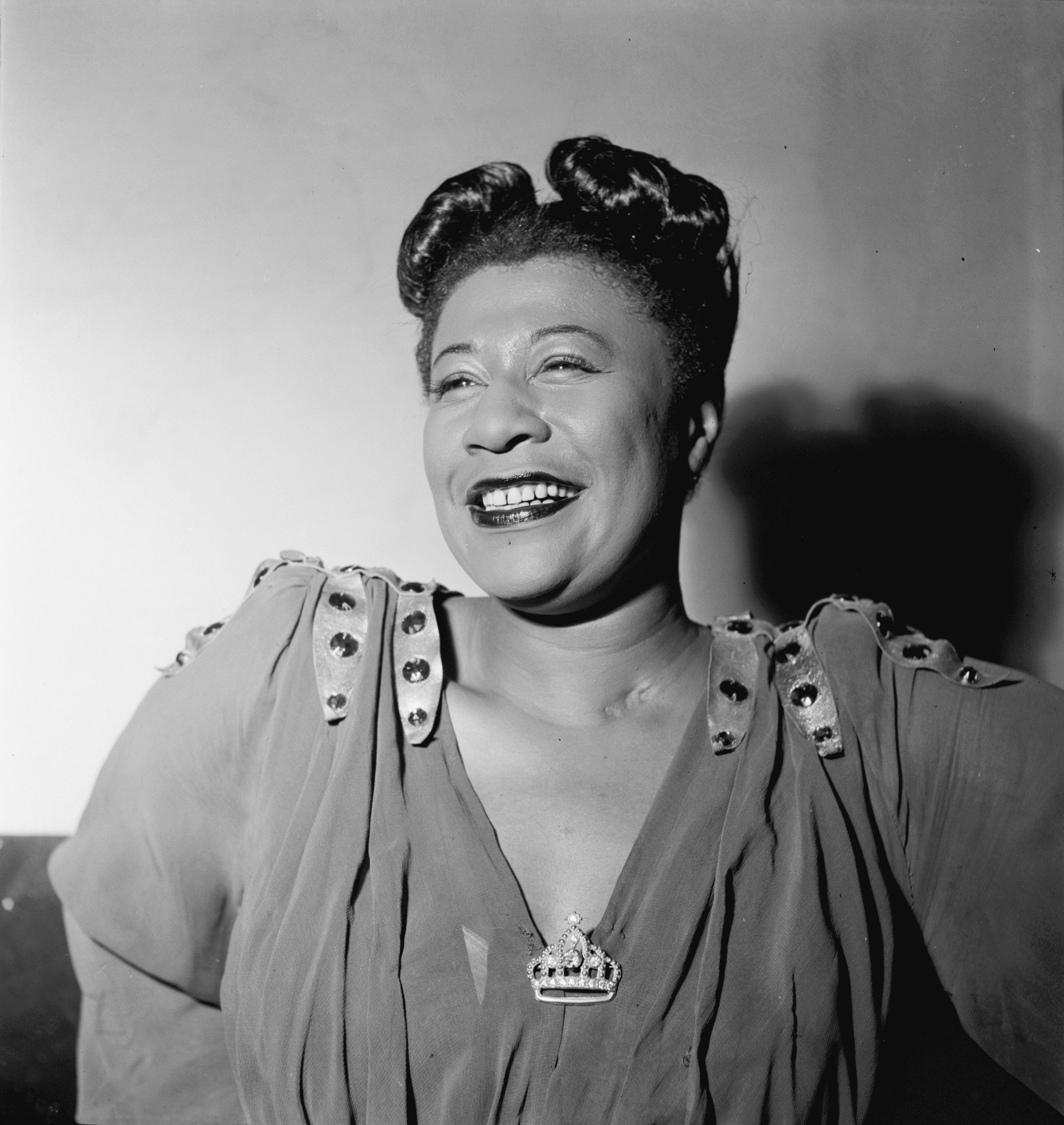
Two-time winner Ella Fitzgerald.

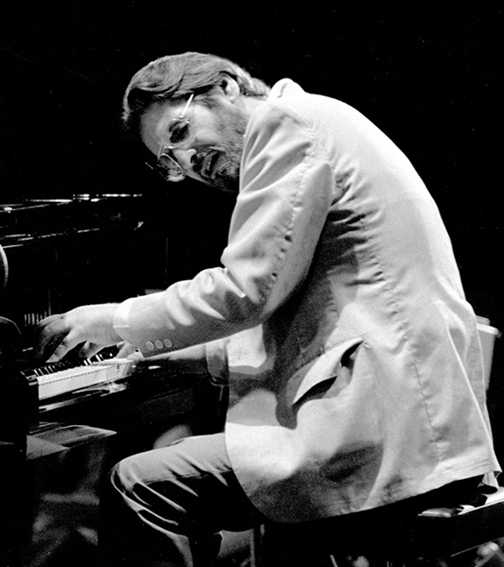
Two-time winner Bill Evans.

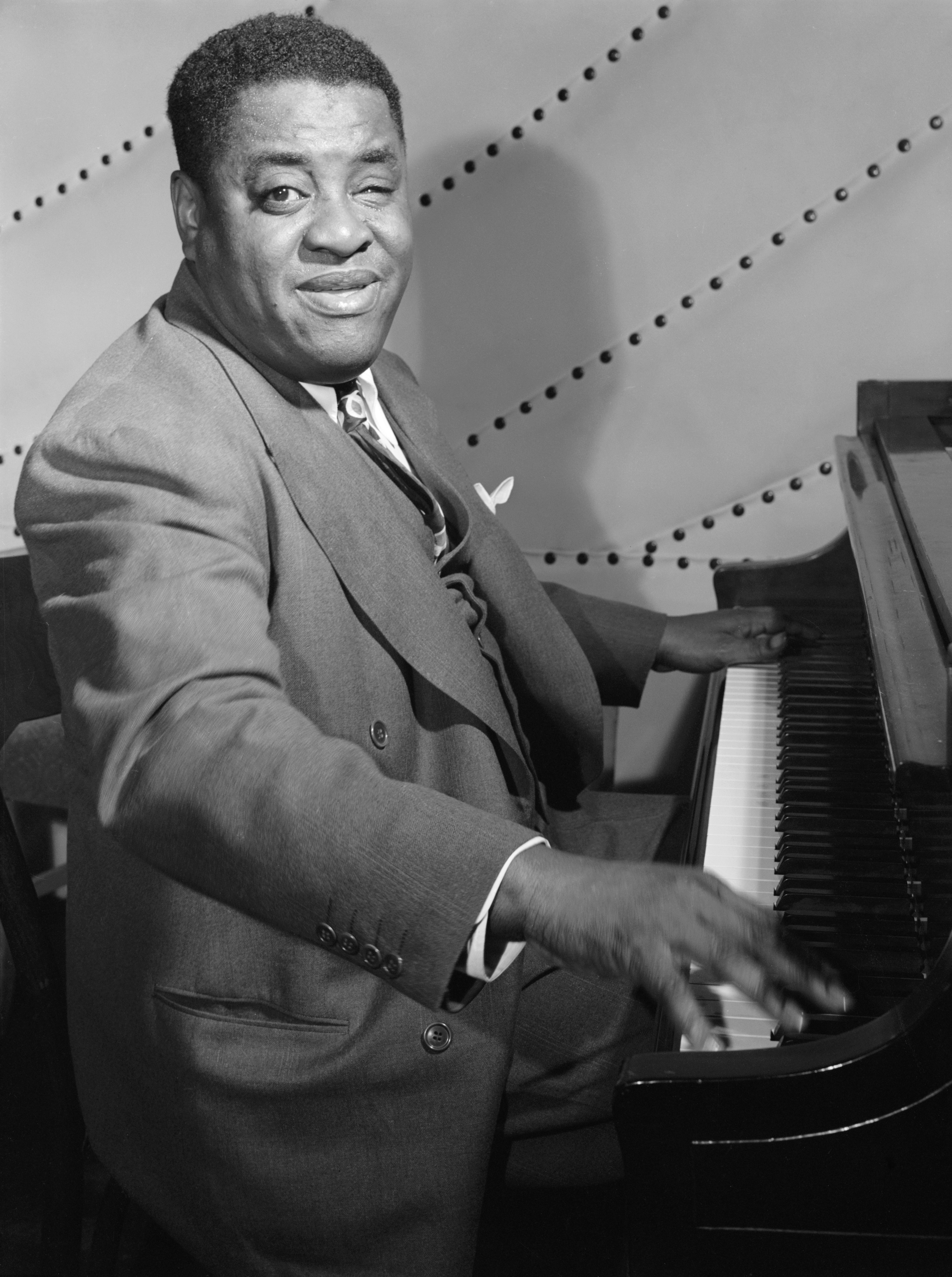
1974 award-winner Art Tatum.

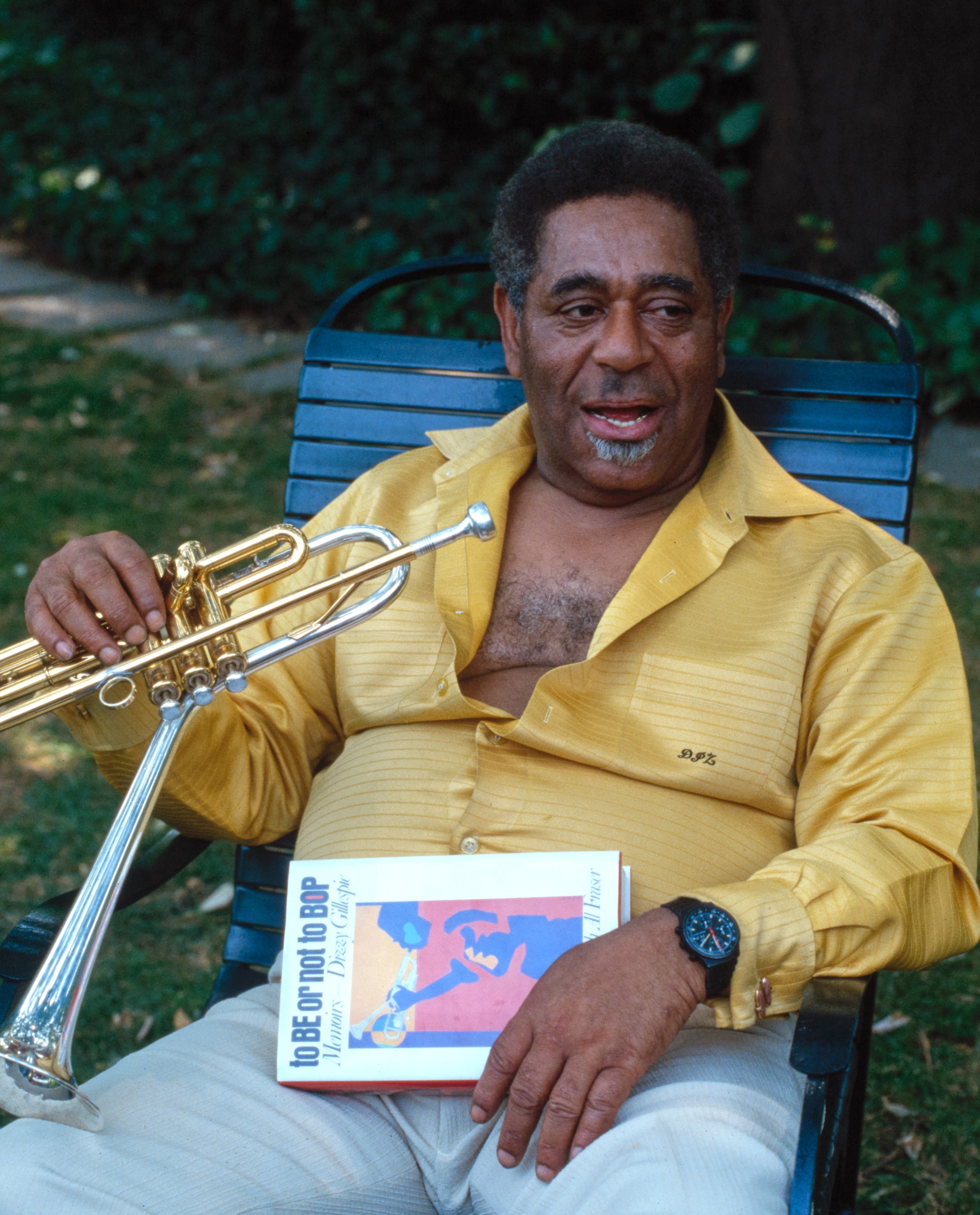
Two-time winner Dizzy Gillespie.

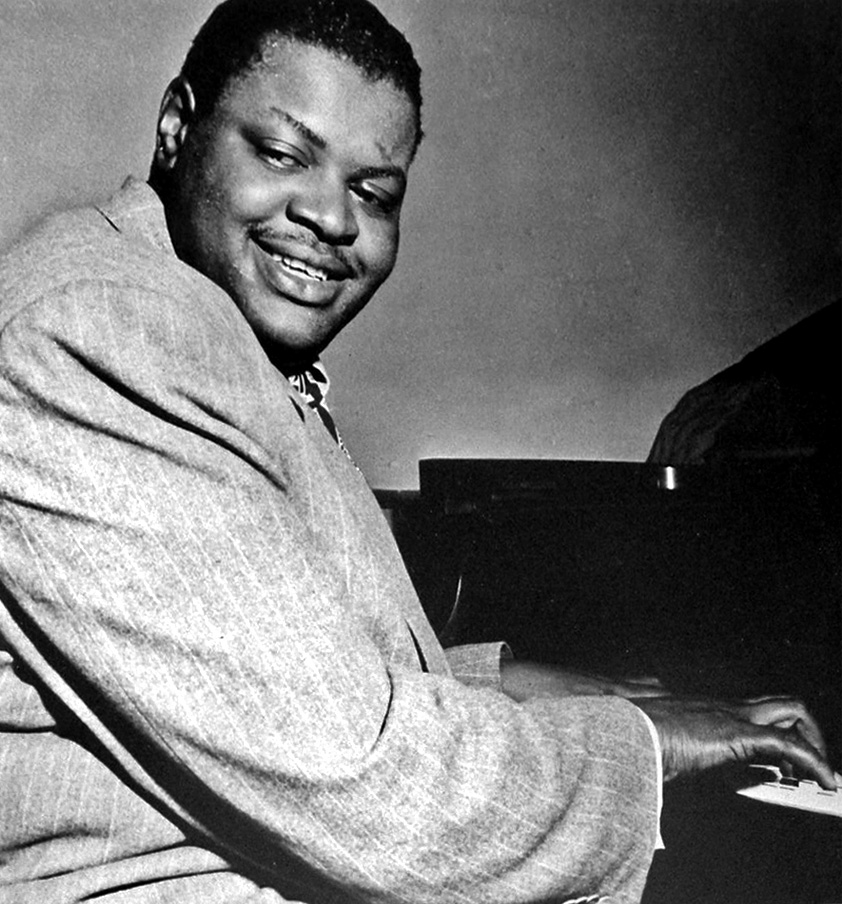
Four-time winner Oscar Peterson.

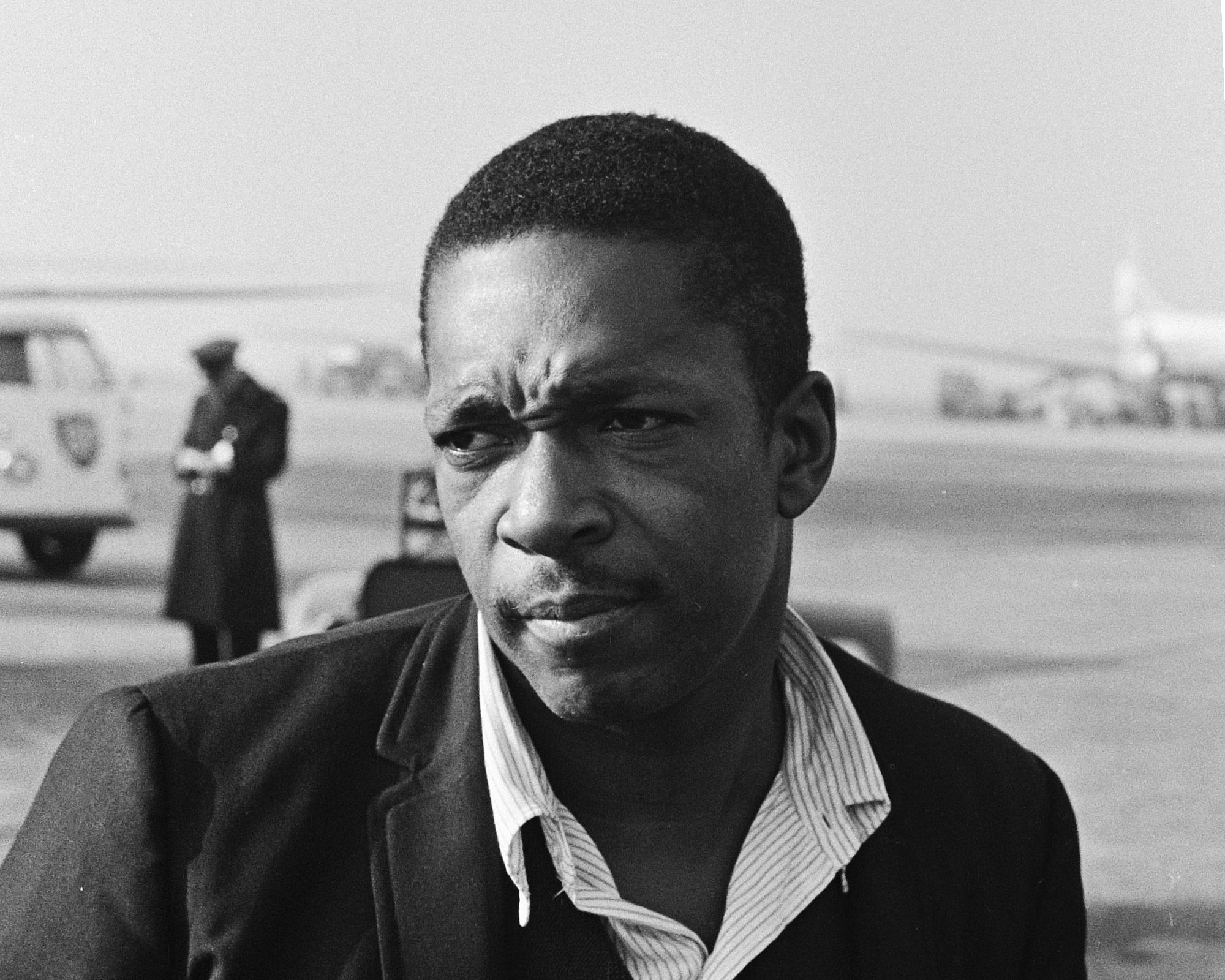
1982 winner John Coltrane.

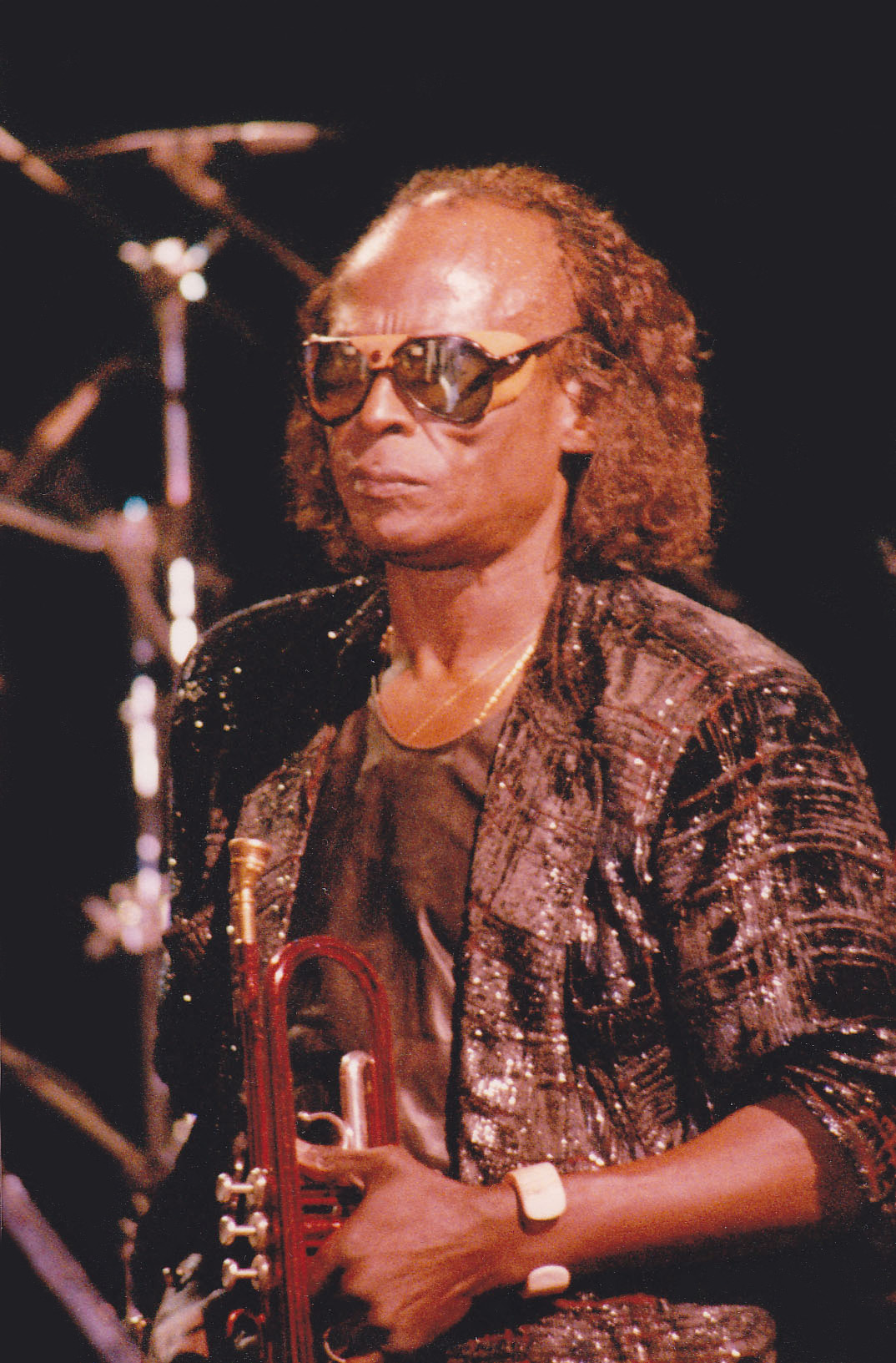
Three-time winner Miles Davis.

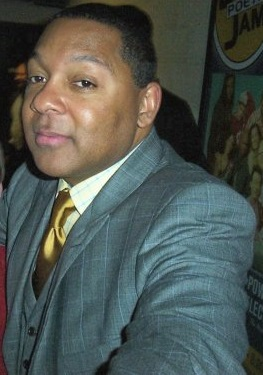
Three-time winner Wynton Marsalis.

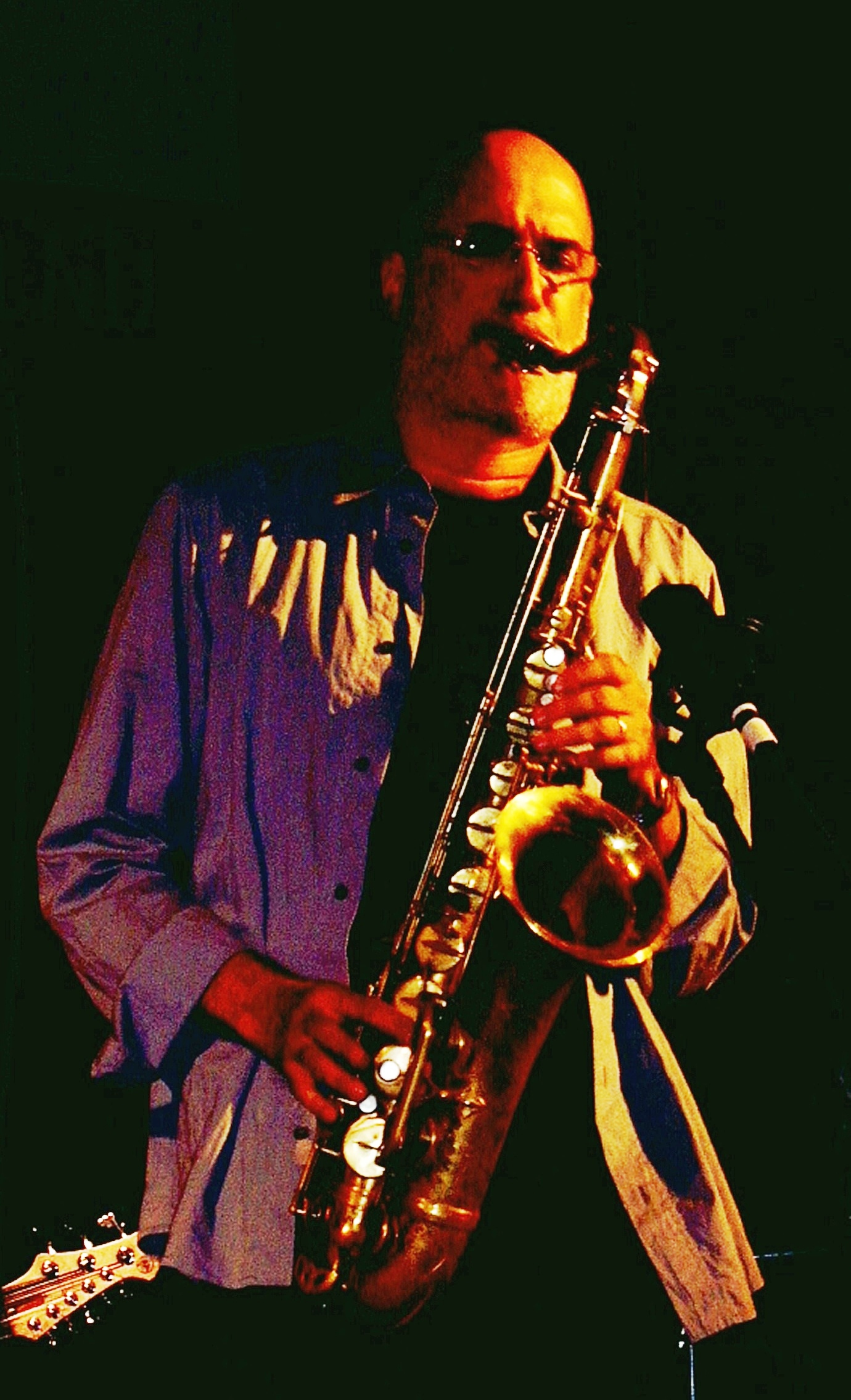
Six-time winner Michael Brecker.

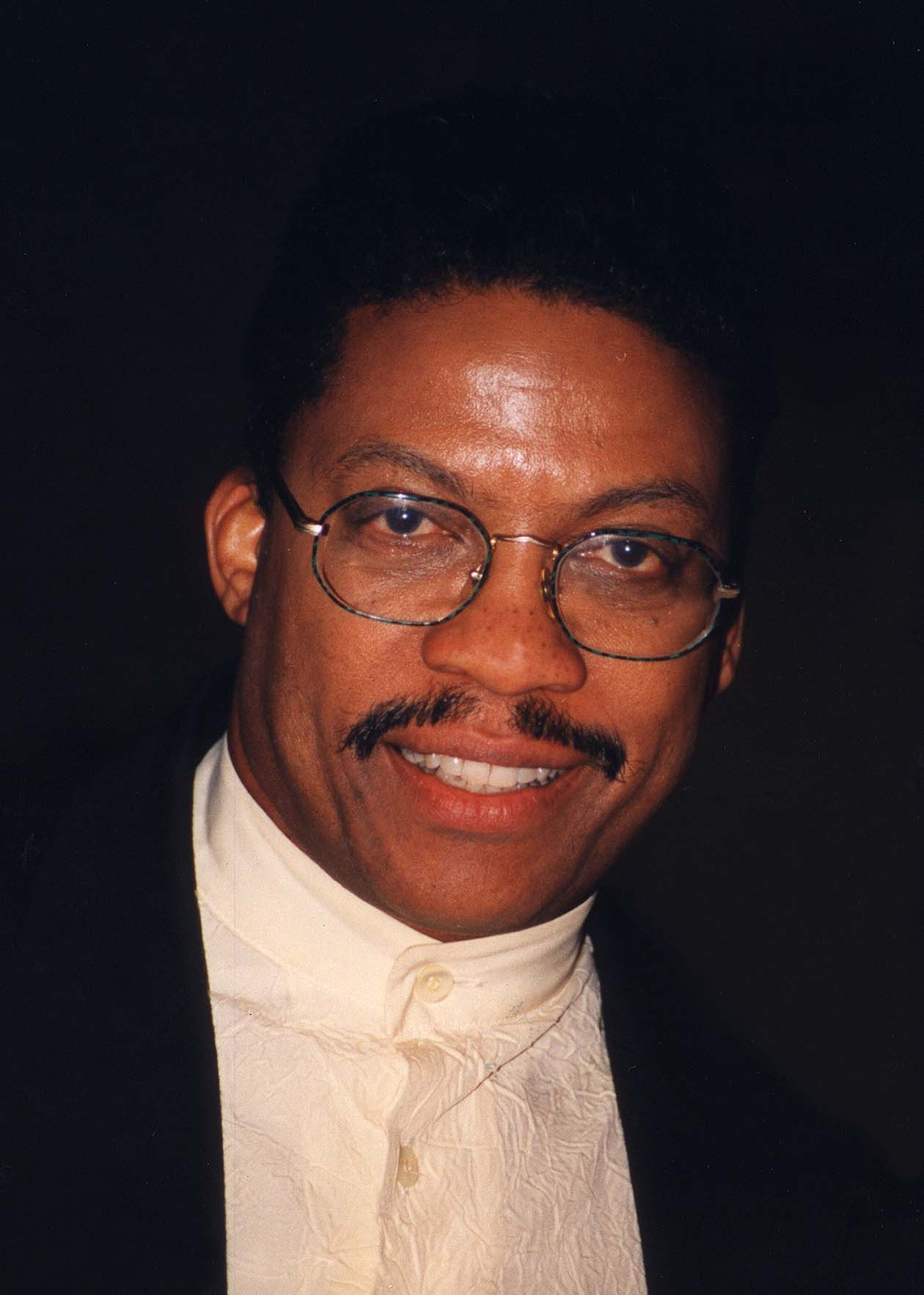
Three-time winner Herbie Hancock.

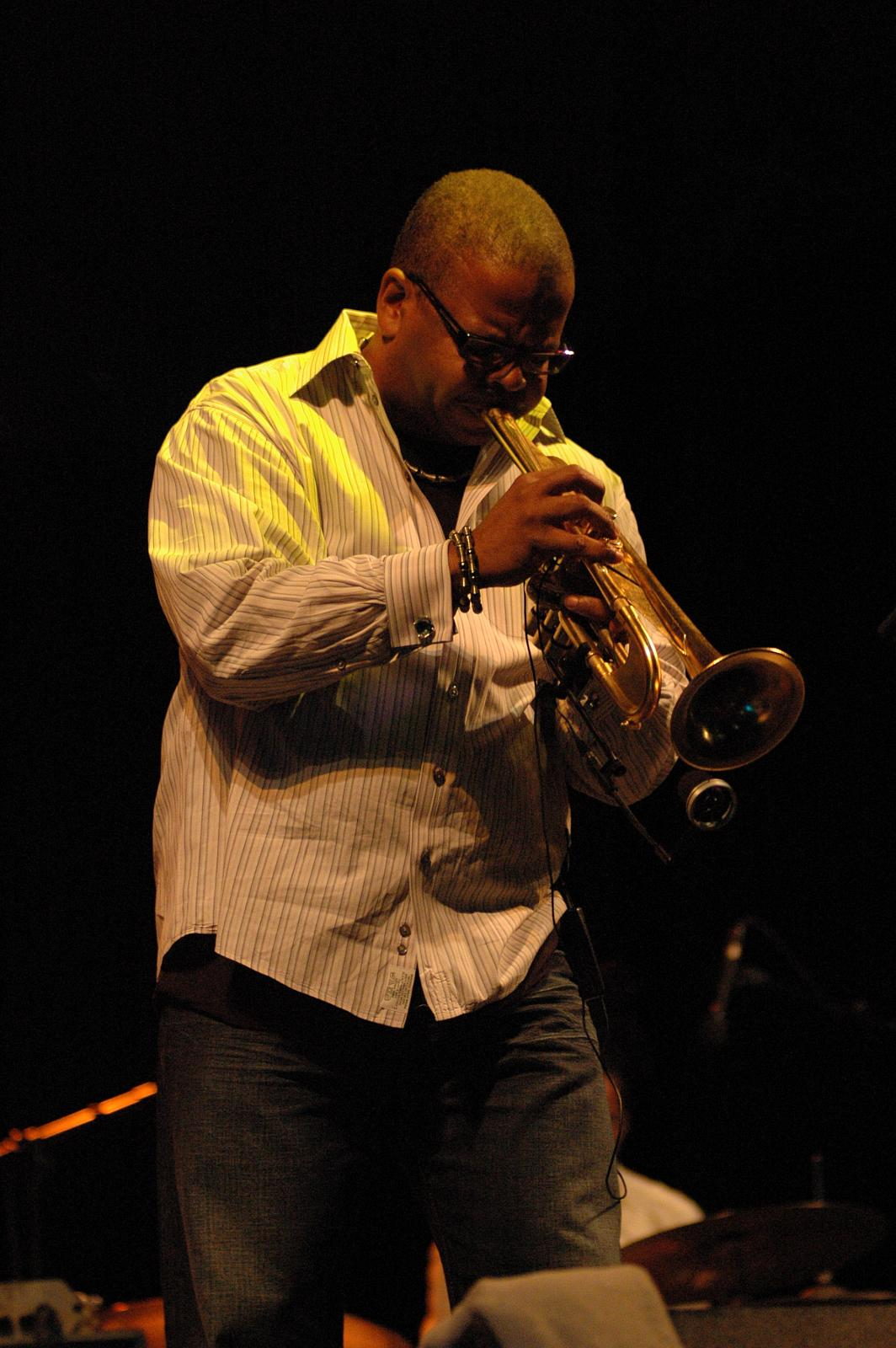
Two-time winner Terence Blanchard.

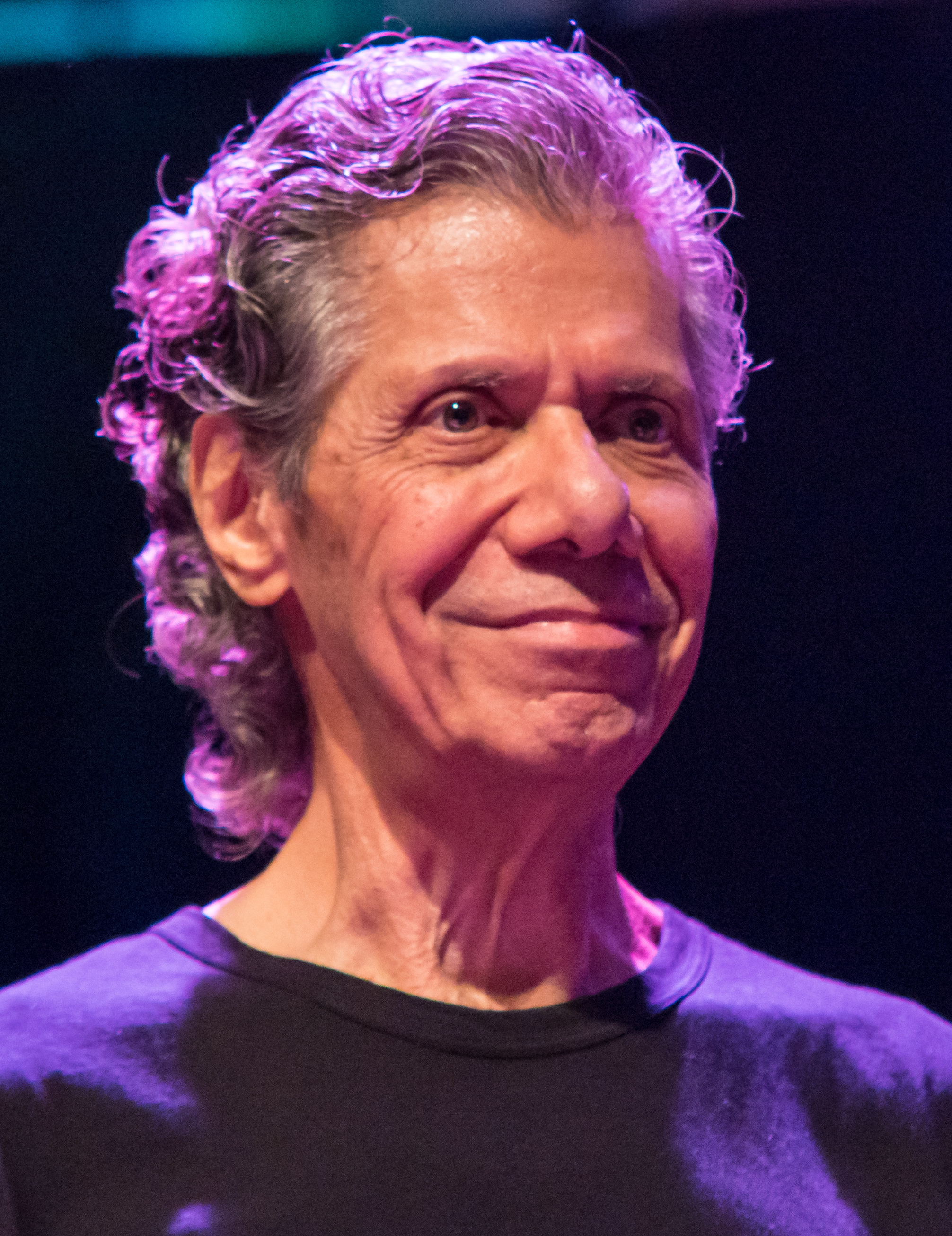
Eight-time winner Chick Corea.

Year^{[I]}	Performing artist(s)	Work	Nominees	Ref.
1959	Ella Fitzgerald	Ella Fitzgerald Sings the Duke Ellington Songbook	Jonah Jones – Jumpin' with Jonah; Matty Matlock – "Dixieland Story"; George Shearing – Burnished Brass; Jonah Jones – Baubles, Bangles and Beads	
1960	Ella Fitzgerald	Ella Swings Lightly	Red Norvo – "Red Norvo in Hi-Fi"; Andre Previn – "Like Young"; Ruby Braff – "Easy Now"; Bobby Troup – Bobby Troup and His Stars of Jazz; Urbie Green – Best of New Broadway Show Hits	
1972	Bill Evans Trio	The Bill Evans Album	Jimmy Rushing – The You and Me That Used to Be; Earl Hines – Quintessential Recording Session; Phil Woods – Phil Woods and his European Rhythm Machine at the Frankfurt Jazz Festival; Larry Coryell – "Gypsy Queen"; Dizzy Gillespie – Portrait of Jenny; Carmen McRae – Carmen McRae	
1973	Gary Burton	Alone at Last	Sonny Stitt – Tune-Up!; Freddie Hubbard – The Hub of Hubbard; McCoy Tyner – Sahara; Tom Scott – Great Scott	
1974	Art Tatum	God Is in the House	Ray Brown – "The Very Thought of You"; Clifford Brown – The Beginning and the End; Hubert Laws – Morning Star; Freddie Hubbard – "In a Mist"	
1975	Charlie Parker	First Recordings!	Keith Jarrett – Solo-Concerts; McCoy Tyner – "Naima"; Hubert Laws – In the Beginning; Freddie Hubbard – High Energy	
1976	Dizzy Gillespie	Oscar Peterson and Dizzy Gillespie	Phineas Newborn Jr. – Solo Piano; Phil Woods – Images; John Coltrane – Giant Steps (First Release of Alternate Take); Jim Hall – Concierto	
1977	Count Basie	Basie & Zoot	Art Tatum – Works of Art; Phil Woods – The New Phil Woods Album; Jaco Pastorius – "Donna Lee"; Jim Hall – Commitment; Clark Terry – Clark Terry and His Jolly Giants	
1978	Oscar Peterson	The Giants	Phil Woods – The Phil Woods Six-Live from The Showboat; Jaco Pastorius – Heavy Weather; John Coltrane – Afro Blue Impressions; Hank Jones – Bop Redux	
1979	Oscar Peterson	Oscar Peterson Jam – Montreux '77	Stan Getz – Stan Getz Gold; Dexter Gordon – Sophisticated Giant; Woody Shaw – Rosewood; Al Cohn and Jimmy Rowles – Heavy Love	
1980	Oscar Peterson	Jousts	Zoot Sims – Warm Tenor; Pepper Adams – Reflectory; Paul Desmond – Paul Desmond; Dexter Gordon – Manhattan Symphonie	
1981	Bill Evans	I Will Say Goodbye	Phil Woods – The Phil Woods Quartet - Volume One; Hank Jones – I Remember You; Jimmy Knepper – Cunningbird; Pepper Adams – Chasin' the Bird	
1982	John Coltrane	Bye Bye Blackbird	Pepper Adams – The Master...Pepper Adams; Ira Sullivan – The Incredible Ira Sullivan; Pete Christlieb – Self Portrait; Jimmy Rowles – Music's The Only Thing That's On My Mind	
1983	Miles Davis	We Want Miles	Wynton Marsalis – Wynton Marsalis; Tommy Flanagan – The Magnificent Tommy Flanagan; Ira Sullivan – Night and Day; Jimmy Rowles – Jimmy Rowles Plays Duke Ellington and Billy Strayhorn	
1984	Wynton Marsalis	Think of One	Chick Corea – Trio Music; Sonny Stitt – The Last Stitt Sessions, Vol. 1; Art Blakey – Keystone 3; Phil Woods – At the Vanguard	
1985	Wynton Marsalis	Hot House Flowers	Tommy Flanagan – Thelonica; Zoot Sims – Quietly There; Pepper Adams & Kenny Wheeler – Live at Fat Tuesday's; Ira Sullivan – Ira Sullivan... Does It All	
1986	Wynton Marsalis	Black Codes (From the Underground)	Dizzy Gillespie – "Sing Joy Spring"; James Moody – "Meet Benny Bailey"; Stanley Jordan – Magic Touch; Miles Davis – "Human Nature"	
1987	Miles Davis	Tutu	Branford Marsalis – Royal Garden Blues; Wynton Marsalis – "Insane Asylum"; Dizzy Gillespie – Closer to the Source; Eddie Daniels – Breakthrough	
1988	Dexter Gordon	The Other Side of Round Midnight	Eddie Daniels – To Bird with Love; Wynton Marsalis – Marsalis Standard Time, Vol. I; Branford Marsalis – "Cottontail"	
1989	Michael Brecker	Don't Try This at Home	Wynton Marsalis – The Wynton Marsalis Quartet Live at Blues Alley; Branford Marsalis – Random Abstract; Miles Davis – Music from Siesta; Rob Wasserman – Duets	
1990	Miles Davis	Aura	Wynton Marsalis – The Majesty of the Blues; Chick Corea – "Sophisticated Lady"; John Patitucci – "Bessie's Blues"; André Previn – After Hours	
1991	Oscar Peterson	The Legendary Oscar Peterson Trio Live at the Blue Note	Miles Davis – The Hot Spot; Branford Marsalis – Crazy People Music; George Benson – "Basie's Bag"; Stan Getz – Anniversary!	
1992	Stan Getz	"I Remember You"	Dave Grusin – "How Long Has This Been Going On?"; Jean "Toots" Thielemans – "Bluesette"; David Sanborn – "Another Hand"; Phil Woods – "All Bird's Children"	
1993	Joe Henderson	"Lush Life"	Kenny Barron & Stan Getz – "Soul Eyes"; Miles Davis – "Fantasy"; Wynton Marsalis – "Blue Interlude"; Randy Brecker – "Above and Below"	
1994	Joe Henderson	"Miles Ahead"	Benny Carter – "The More I See You"; Phil Woods – "Nostalgico"; Herbie Hancock – "Brasil (Aquarela Do Brasil)"; Lee Ritenour – "4 on 6"	
1995	Benny Carter	"Prelude to a Kiss"	Wayne Shorter – "Pinocchio"; Chick Corea – "Lush Life"; Charlie Haden – "Alone Together"; Michael Brecker – "African Skies"	
1996	Michael Brecker	"Impressions"	Eliane Elias & Herbie Hancock – "The Way You Look Tonight"; Kenny Barron – "Take the Coltrane"; Charlie Haden & Hank Jones – "Go Down Moses"; Pete Christlieb – "But Beautiful"	
1997	Michael Brecker	"Cabin Fever"	Charlie Haden – "Now is the Hour"; Joe Lovano – "Duke Ellington's Sound of Love"; Horace Silver – "Diggin' on Dexter"; Gonzalo Rubalcaba – "Agua de Beber"	
1998	Doc Cheatham & Nicholas Payton	"Stardust"	Buddy DeFranco – "You Must Believe in Swing"; Antonio Hart – "The Community"; Tommy Flanagan – "Dear Old Stockholm"; Brad Mehldau – "Blame It On My Youth"	
1999	Gary Burton & Chick Corea	"Rhumbata"	Randy Brecker – "My Funny Valentine"; David Liebman – "My Favorite Things"; Kenny Barron – "For Heaven's Sake"; Benny Golson – "Body and Soul"	
2000	Wayne Shorter	"In Walked Wayne"	Gary Burton – "Straight Up and Down"; Chick Corea – "Wigwam"; Stefon Harris – "There Is No Greater Love"; Chris Potter – "In Vogue"	
2001	Pat Metheny	"(Go) Get It"	Kenny Barron – "Passion Dance"; Terence Blanchard – "I Thought About You"; Michael Brecker – "Outrance"; Keith Jarrett – "I Got It Bad And That Ain't Good"	
2002	Michael Brecker	"Chan's Song"	Kenny Barron and Regina Carter – "Fragile"; Terence Blanchard – "Lost in a Fog"; Gary Burton – "Move"; Pat Martino – "All Blues"	
2003	Herbie Hancock	"My Ship"	Michael Brecker – "Naima"; Pete Christlieb – "Chelsea Bridge"; Tommy Flanagan – "Sunset & the Mockingbird"; Pat Metheny – "Proof"	
2004	Chick Corea	"Matrix"	Joey DeFrancesco – "All or Nothing at All"; Keith Jarrett – "Butch and Butch"; Pat Martino – "Africa"; Mike Melvoin – "All or Nothing at All"	
2005	Herbie Hancock	"Speak Like a Child"	Alan Broadbent – "What's New"; Don Byron – "I Want To Be Happy"; Donny McCaslin – "Bulería, Soleá y Rumba"; John Scofield – "Wee"	
2006	Sonny Rollins	"Why Was I Born?"	Alan Broadbent – "Round Midnight"; Ravi Coltrane – "Away"; Herbie Hancock – "The Source"; Branford Marsalis – "A Love Supreme -- Acknowledgement"	
2007	Michael Brecker	"Some Skunk Funk"	Paquito D'Rivera – "Paq Man"; Taylor Eigsti – "Freedom Jazz Dance"; Roy Haynes – "Hippidy Hop" (Drum Solo); Branford Marsalis – "Hope"	
2008	Michael Brecker	"Anagram"	Terence Blanchard – "Levees"; Herbie Hancock – "Both Sides Now"; Hank Jones – "Lullaby"; Paul McCandless – "1000 Kilometers"	
2009	Terence Blanchard	"Be-Bop"	Till Brönner – "Seven Steps to Heaven"; Gary Burton & Chick Corea – "Waltz for Debby"; Pat Metheny – "Son of Thirteen"; James Moody – "Be–Bop"	
2010	Terence Blanchard	"Dancin' 4 Chicken"	Gerald Clayton – "All Of You"; Roy Hargrove – "Ms. Garvey, Ms. Garvey"; Martial Solal – "On Green Dolphin Street"; Miguel Zenón – "Villa Palmeras"	
2011	Herbie Hancock	"A Change Is Gonna Come"	Alan Broadbent – "Solar"; Keith Jarrett – "Body and Soul"; Hank Jones – "Lonely Woman"; Wynton Marsalis – "Van Gogh"	
2012	Chick Corea	"500 Miles High"	Randy Brecker – "All or Nothing at All"; Ron Carter – "You Are My Sunshine"; Fred Hersch – "Work"; Sonny Rollins – "Sonnymoon for Two"	
2013	Gary Burton & Chick Corea	"Hot House"	Ravi Coltrane – "Cross Roads"; Chick Corea – "Alice in Wonderland"; Kenny Garrett – "J. Mac"; Brad Mehldau – "Ode"	
2014	Wayne Shorter	"Orbits"	Terence Blanchard – "Don't Run"; Paquito D'Rivera – "Song for Maura"; Fred Hersch – "Song Without Words #4: Duet"; Donny McCaslin – "Stadium Jazz"	
2015	Chick Corea	"Fingerprints"	Kenny Barron – "The Eye of the Hurricane"; Fred Hersch – "You & the Night & the Music"; Joe Lovano – "Recorda Me"; Brad Mehldau – "Sleeping Giant"	
2016	Christian McBride	"Cherokee"	Joey Alexander – "Giant Steps"; Donny McCaslin – "Arbiters of Evolution"; Joshua Redman – "Friend or Foe"; John Scofield – "Past Present"	
2017	John Scofield	"I'm So Lonesome I Could Cry"	Joey Alexander – "Countdown"; Ravi Coltrane – "In Movement"; Fred Hersch – "We See"; Brad Mehldau – "I Concentrate on You"	
2018	John McLaughlin	"Miles Beyond"	Sara Caswell – "Can't Remember Why"; Billy Childs – "Dance of Shiva"; Fred Hersch – "Whisper Not"; Chris Potter – "Ilimba"	
2019	John Daversa	"Don't Fence Me In"	Regina Carter – "Some Of That Sunshine"; Fred Hersch – "We See"; Brad Mehldau – "De-Dah"; Miguel Zenón – "Cadenas"	
2020	Randy Brecker	"Sozinho"	Melissa Aldana – "Elsewhere"; Julian Lage – "Tomorrow Is The Question"; Branford Marsalis – "The Windup"; Christian McBride – "Sightseeing"	
2021	Chick Corea	"All Blues"	Christian Scott aTunde Adjuah – "Guinevere"; Regina Carter – "Pachamama"; Gerald Clayton – "Celia"; Joshua Redman – "Moe Honk"	
2022	Chick Corea	"Humpty Dumpty (Set 2)"	Christian Scott aTunde Adjuah – "Sackodougou"; Kenny Barron – "Kick Those Feet"; Jon Batiste – "Bigger Than Us"; Terence Blanchard – "Absence"	
2023	Wayne Shorter & Leo Genovese (soloist)	"Endangered Species"	Ambrose Akinmusire – "Rounds (Live)"; Gerald Albright – "Keep Holding On"; Melissa Aldana – "Falling"; Marcus Baylor – "Call of the Drum"; John Beasley – "Cherokee/Koko"	
2024	Samara Joy	"Tight"	Adam Blackstone featuring the Baylor Project & Russell Ferranté – "Vulnerable (Live)"; Fred Hersch & Esperanza Spalding – "But Not for Me"; Jon Batiste – "Movement 18' (Heroes)"; Lakecia Benjamin – "Basquiat"	
2025	Samara Joy featuring Sullivan Fortner	"Twinkle Twinkle Little Me"	The Baylor Project – "Walk With Me, Lord (SOUND | SPIRIT)"; Lakecia Benjamin featuring Randy Brecker, Jeff "Tain" Watts, & John Scofield – "Phoenix Reimagined (Live)"; Chick Corea & Béla Fleck – "Juno"; Dan Pugach Big Band featuring Nicole Zuraitis & Troy Roberts – "Little Fears"	
2026	Chick Corea, Christian McBride & Brian Blade	"Windows - Live"	Lakecia Benjamin ft. Immanuel Wilkins & Mark Whitfield - Noble Rise; Samara Joy - Peace Of Mind / Dreams Come True; Michael Mayo - Four; Nicole Zuraitis, Dan Pugach, Tom Scott, Idan Morim, Keyon Harrold & Rachel Eckroth - All Stars Lead To You - Live	
2027	Winner TBA on 7 February 2027		Jon Batiste - In Walked Bud; The Baylor Project - Good Life - Tamron Hall Main Title Theme; Cécile McLorin Salvant, Metropole Orkest & Jules Buckley - Sophisticated Lady; Deborah Silver & Diane Schuur - The Lady is a Tramp; Nicole Zuraitis, Christian McBride, Gilad Hekselman & Dan Pugach - I Get Along Without You Very Well (Except Sometimes)	

== Artists with multiple wins ==
8 wins

- Chick Corea

4 wins

- Oscar Peterson

3 wins

- Gary Burton
- Miles Davis
- Herbie Hancock
- Wynton Marsalis
- Wayne Shorter

2 wins

- Ella Fitzgerald
- Dizzy Gillespie
- Joe Henderson
- Samara Joy
- Christian McBride

== Artists with multiple nominations ==
15 nominations

- Chick Corea

10 nominations

- Wynton Marsalis

8 nominations

- Phil Woods

7 nominations

- Kenny Barron
- Miles Davis
- Herbie Hancock
- Branford Marsalis

6 nominations

- Gary Burton

5 nominations

- Randy Brecker
- Dizzy Gillespie
- Hank Jones
- Brad Mehldau

4 nominations

- Pepper Adams
- Tommy Flanagan
- Stan Getz
- Keith Jarrett
- Oscar Peterson
- Wayne Shorter

3 nominations

- Alan Broadbent
- Pete Christlieb
- John Coltrane
- Dexter Gordon
- Charlie Haden
- Freddie Hubbard
- Pat Metheny
- Jimmy Rowles
- Ira Sullivan

2 nominations

- Joey Alexander
- Benny Carter
- Eddie Daniels
- Bill Evans
- Ella Fitzgerald
- Joe Henderson
- Jim Hall
- Jonah Jones
- Samara Joy
- Hubert Laws
- Joe Lovano
- Pat Martino
- Jaco Pastorius
- Andre Previn
- Sonny Rollins
- Christian Scott Chief Xian aTunde Adjuah
- Zoot Sims
- Sonny Stitt
- Art Tatum
- McCoy Tyner
