= Live Trane: The European Tours =

Live album by John Coltrane
- Released: 2001
- Recorded: 1961, 1962, and 1963
- Venue: Paris, Stockholm, Hamburg, Berlin, Stuttgart
- Genre: jazz
- Label: Pablo
- Producer: Norman Granz

Live Trane: The European Tours is a 7–CD compilation album by American saxophonist John Coltrane containing music recorded live during 1961, 1962, and 1963 European tours, all of which took place under the auspices of Norman Granz's Jazz at the Philharmonic programs. The album, which was released in 2001 by Pablo Records, features Coltrane on tenor and soprano saxophones along with pianist McCoy Tyner, bassists Jimmy Garrison and Reggie Workman, and drummer Elvin Jones. In addition, Eric Dolphy is heard on alto saxophone, bass clarinet, and flute on a number of tracks.

The 1961 European tour took place from November 11 through December 4, and immediately followed the Coltrane quintet's stay at the Village Vanguard (captured on Coltrane "Live" at the Village Vanguard and The Complete 1961 Village Vanguard Recordings). During the tour, the group was paired with the Dizzy Gillespie Quintet. The tour consisted of a UK portion (Kilburn (London), Birmingham, Glasgow, Newcastle, Leicester, Brighton, and Walthamstow (London)) from November 11–17, followed by a continental visit (Paris, Scheveningen, Amsterdam, Copenhagen, Gothenburg, Helsinki, Stockholm, Hannover, Hamburg, Copenhagen (again), Stuttgart, Düsseldorf, Frankfurt am Main, Nuremberg, Munich, Berlin, and Baden-Baden) from November 18 - December 4.

The 1962 tour occurred during November 17 - December 2, and included stops in Paris, Zurich, Stockholm, Helsinki, Oslo, Copenhagen, Berlin, Hamburg, Vienna, Graz, Munich, Frankfurt am Main, Scheveningen, Amsterdam, and Milan. The 1963 tour took place from October 22 - November 4, and encompassed Stockholm, Oslo, Helsinki, Copenhagen, Amsterdam, Milan, Kaiserslautern, Frankfurt am Main, Paris, Berlin, Munich, and Stuttgart.

Nineteen of the tracks on Live Trane had not previously appeared on authorized releases, while the remaining tracks were included on The Paris Concert, The European Tour, Afro Blue Impressions, and Bye Bye Blackbird, but appear here in remastered form.

== Reception ==
Professional ratings
Review scores
Source	Rating
AllMusic	4/5 stars
The Penguin Guide to Jazz	4/4 stars

In a review for AllMusic, Ken Dryden wrote: "A number of titles are repeated throughout the set... but true Coltrane fans will marvel at the differences between them from one concert to the next. Coltrane plays at a consistently high level throughout each performance... Coltrane and his musicians are clearly inspired by the enthusiastic audiences who witnessed the making of this music. This is an essential set for Coltrane fans."

Writing for All About Jazz, Scott Morrow called the album a "beyond bold musical juggernaut that will blow your mind like a cherry bomb in a tomato" and commented: "this is beautiful, spiritual, inspiring music; from what for many folks is his most fruitful period... This set, including many unreleased gems, helps to fill-out our understanding of just what the John Coltrane Quartet was capable of at this outstanding point in their evolution. Also, you've never heard this band – Trane, especially – so energized, and to hear a super-charged Coltrane blowing like the devil's gnawing on his heels is even better. And the crowd may just be the difference: the audience reaction on these discs often sound as intensely charged as an American rockshow... Trane seems to be on fire, and I honestly believe this is John Coltrane at his most inspired."

In a separate All About Jazz article, David Rickert stated: "This Pablo set should be greeted with the same shout of joy reserved for an Ohio State win over Michigan, simply because it over the most comprehensive look at a transition period of a musician whose career was constantly in transition to begin with... The music is unbelievably intense, filled with surging rhythms and dark melodies that make it a set best experienced a disc at a time... These live versions suggest that Coltrane showed a different side to his musical personality in clubs, often doubling or tripling the running times of the studio versions and display Coltrane’s ability for constructing solos that never seem repetitive or overlong... It’s hard to imagine a more important document of Coltrane's work released anytime soon."

Alan Jones, writing for One Final Note, remarked: "Live Trane is an historic document that charts one of Coltrane's most burgeoning periods: those days in the early 60's that he set Europe ablaze with the 'Classic Quartet' (in some cases with Eric Dolphy aboard), transitioning from grounded to skyborn... Each track is a certified gem, regardless of the varying sound quality. The solos, along with the interpretation of the music, take new shape every time the group hits the stage. It is here in the touring environment in the early 1960's that we begin to hear Coltrane and his band's refusal to entertain repetition, an element of his music that would be the revolutionary watermark of innovation that flourished later in his career. Where his studio dates of the time are cropped in an expedient marriage of the artist's intentions and commercial mindfulness, the live dates allow the musicians to shake free the superfluous bees in the bonnet, coming together and fittingly apart until the chemistry of resolve becomes the unquestionable solution... Each disc... contains treasures rich in the existential deconstruction and spiritual investigation that remains the most persuasive ingredient to Coltrane's music."

The authors of The Penguin Guide to Jazz Recordings wrote: "A titanic collection... for anyone who is just beginning to explore the Coltrane canon, this is a valuable resource."

== Track listing ==
Disc 1

1. "Impressions" (John Coltrane) – 11:14
2. "My Favorite Things" (Oscar Hammerstein II, Richard Rodgers) – 25:11
3. "Blue Trane" (John Coltrane) – 8:54
4. "Naima" (John Coltrane) – 4:05
5. "Impressions" (John Coltrane) – 7:17
6. "My Favorite Things" (Oscar Hammerstein II, Richard Rodgers) – 20:27

According to the album notes, tracks 1–2 were recorded in Paris, November 18, 1961. However, they were actually recorded in Stockholm on November 23, 1961. Tracks 3–6 were also recorded in Stockholm on November 23, 1961.

Disc 2

1. "Mr. P.C." (John Coltrane) – 11:17
2. "Miles' Mode" (John Coltrane, Eric Dolphy) – 10:54
3. "My Favorite Things" (Oscar Hammerstein II, Richard Rodgers) – 19:09
4. Norman Granz Introduction – 1:44
5. "Bye Bye Blackbird" (Mort Dixon, Ray Henderson) – 19:48
6. "The Inch Worm" (Frank Loesser) – 10:17
7. "Ev'ry Time We Say Goodbye" (Cole Porter) – 4:58

According to the album notes, tracks 1–3 were recorded in Hamburg, November 25, 1962. However, they were actually recorded at Birdland in New York City, on February 10, 1962. In addition, the bassist on these tracks is incorrectly listed as being Reggie Workman, whereas it is actually Jimmy Garrison. Tracks 4–7 were recorded in Paris, November 17, 1962.

Disc 3

1. "Mr. P.C." (John Coltrane) – 15:13
2. "My Favorite Things" (Oscar Hammerstein II, Richard Rodgers) – 23:55
3. "The Inch Worm" (Frank Loesser) – 7:06
4. "Mr. P.C." (John Coltrane) – 15:03
5. "Naima" (John Coltrane) – 9:24

According to the album notes, tracks 1–4 were recorded in Paris, November 17, 1962. However, "The Inch Worm" and the first version of "Mr. P.C." were actually recorded in Stockholm, November 19 on 1962, while "My Favorite Things" was recorded in Paris on November 1, 1963. Track 5 was recorded in Stockholm, November 19, 1962.

Disc 4

1. "Traneing In" (John Coltrane) – 18:44
2. "Bye Bye Blackbird" (Mort Dixon, Ray Henderson) – 17:52
3. "Impressions" (John Coltrane) – 8:01
4. Swedish Introduction – 1:08
5. "Traneing In" (John Coltrane) – 11:50
6. "Mr. P.C." (John Coltrane) – 18:09

Tracks 1–3 were recorded in Stockholm, November 19, 1962. Tracks 4–6 were recorded in Stockholm, October 22, 1963.

Disc 5

1. "Naima" (John Coltrane) – 6:49
2. "The Promise" (John Coltrane) – 6:57
3. "Spiritual" (John Coltrane) – 12:22
4. "Impressions" (John Coltrane) – 11:35
5. "I Want To Talk About You" (Billy Eckstine) – 9:53
6. "My Favorite Things" (Oscar Hammerstein II, Richard Rodgers) – 13:56

Recorded in Stockholm, October 22, 1963.

Disc 6

1. "Mr. P.C." (John Coltrane) – 26:28
2. "Lonnie's Lament" (John Coltrane) – 10:12
3. "Naima" (John Coltrane) – 8:03
4. "Chasin' the Trane" (John Coltrane) – 5:41
5. "My Favorite Things" (Oscar Hammerstein II, Richard Rodgers) – 21:04

Track 1 was recorded in Paris, November 1, 1963. Tracks 2–5 were recorded in Berlin, November 2, 1963.

Disc 7

1. "Afro Blue" (Mongo Santamaría) – 7:41
2. "Cousin Mary" (John Coltrane) – 9:54
3. "I Want Talk About You" (Billy Eckstine) – 8:23
4. "Impressions" (John Coltrane) – 23:15

Tracks 1–3 were recorded in Berlin, November 2, 1963. Track 4 was recorded in Stuttgart, November 4, 1963.

== Personnel ==
- John Coltrane — tenor saxophone, soprano saxophone
- Eric Dolphy — alto saxophone, bass clarinet, flute
- McCoy Tyner — piano
- Jimmy Garrison — double bass
- Reggie Workman — double bass
- Elvin Jones — drums
