= Carmen Staaf =

American jazz pianist and composer

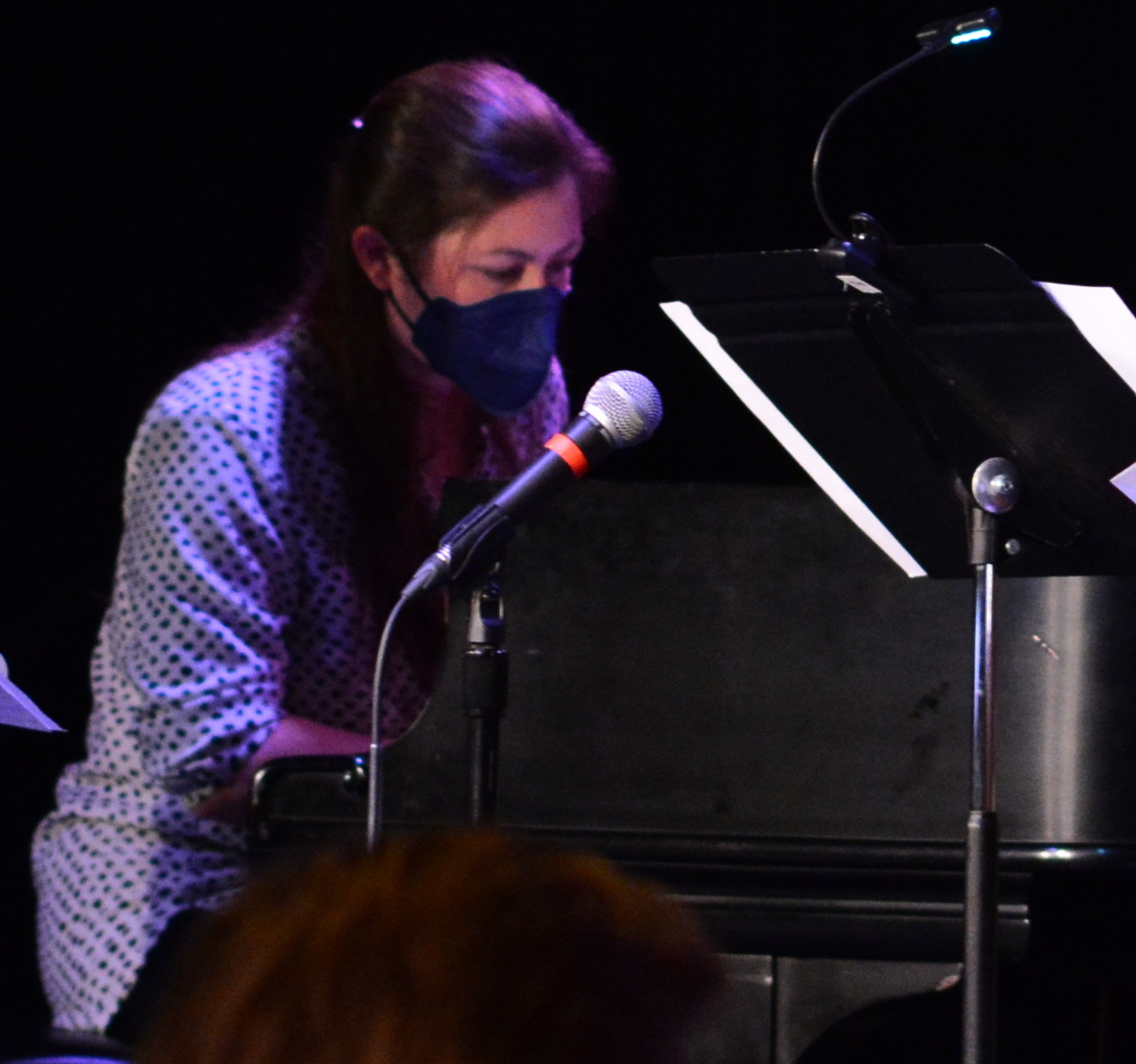
- Staaf performing at the Earshot Jazz Festival in 2023

Background information
- Origin: Seattle, Washington, U.S.
- Genre: Jazz
- Occupations: Pianist, composer, arranger
- Instrument: Piano
- Website: www.carmenstaaf.com

Carmen Staaf is an American jazz pianist, composer, and arranger. She won the Mary Lou Williams Women in Jazz Pianist Competition in 2009 and has served as pianist and musical director for singer Dee Dee Bridgewater. Her recordings include Woodland and Sounding Line, as well as the albums Science Fair and Nearness with drummer Allison Miller.

== Early life and education ==
Staaf grew up in Seattle and graduated from Garfield High School in 1999. She spent six months studying in Cuba before earning degrees in anthropology at Tufts University and jazz performance at the New England Conservatory of Music. She joined the faculty of Berklee College of Music in 2005.

== Career ==
In 2009, Staaf won the piano competition at the Kennedy Center's Mary Lou Williams Women in Jazz Festival. She returned to the festival in 2010 with a trio, performing her own compositions alongside pieces associated with Mary Lou Williams. Her trio album Eye to Eye (2011) drew mainly on recordings made at Seattle's Tula's during the 2010 Earshot Jazz Festival.

While studying at the Thelonious Monk Institute of Jazz Performance in Los Angeles, Staaf performed at the Kennedy Center for NPR's A Jazz Piano Christmas in 2015. She released Day Dream, an album of jazz standards, on Tone Rogue Records in 2017. Her arrangement of the title track, written by Duke Ellington and Billy Strayhorn, features vocalist Nicole Zuraitis.

Staaf and Miller began working together on dance projects in 2015 and released their first album as co-leaders, Science Fair, in 2018 on Sunnyside Records. The album features bassist Matt Penman, saxophonist Dayna Stephens, and trumpeter Ambrose Akinmusire, and includes four pieces by Staaf. It appeared on The New York Times' list of the best jazz releases of 2018. Staaf also joined Miller and violinist Jenny Scheinman in Parlour Game, a quartet with bassist Tony Scherr that released its first album in 2019.

In 2020, Staaf released Woodland on Newvelle Records with bassist Michael Formanek and drummer Jeff Williams. The album includes her own compositions and a solo piano performance of Thelonious Monk's "Pannonica". She and Miller followed Science Fair with Nearness (2022), a piano-and-drums album that pairs Monk's "Ask Me Now" with Staaf's "MLW", a tribute to Mary Lou Williams.

Staaf worked as Bridgewater's pianist and musical director and performed as pianist and arranger in Bridgewater's We Exist! quartet at the Bologna Jazz Festival in 2025.

== Selected discography ==
=== As leader ===
- Eye to Eye (2011)
- Day Dream (Tone Rogue, 2017)
- Woodland (Newvelle, 2020)
- Sounding Line (Sunnyside, 2025)

=== With Allison Miller ===
- Science Fair (Sunnyside, 2018)
- Nearness (Sunnyside, 2022)
