= The European Tour =

Live album by John Coltrane
- Released: 1980
- Recorded: October 22, 1963; Koncerthuset, Stockholm, Sweden
- Label: Pablo Records 2308-222

The European Tour is a posthumous album by jazz musician John Coltrane released in 1980 on the Pablo label. The tracks were recorded on October 22, 1963 at the Koncerthuset in Stockholm, Sweden during a two-week European tour which was produced by Norman Granz, and which included concerts in Oslo, Helsinki, Amsterdam, Milan, Kaiserslautern, Frankfurt/Main, Paris, Berlin, Munich, and Stuttgart. Additional tracks from the Stockholm and Berlin concerts appear on Afro Blue Impressions (Pablo, 1977). Tracks from Stockholm, Berlin, Paris, and Stuttgart are featured on the 2001 Pablo compilation Live Trane: The European Tours.

While in Stockholm, Coltrane obtained a copy of an Albert Ayler record, probably Something Different!!!!!, Ayler's first record. Ayler would soon come to have a strong influence on Coltrane's music.

== Reception ==
Professional ratings
Review scores
Source	Rating
The Penguin Guide to Jazz Recordings	3/4 stars
The Rolling Stone Jazz Record Guide	3/5 stars
AllMusic	4.5/5 stars

In a November 1963 review in Orkester Journalen, Lars Werner commented that the second Stockholm concert on October 22 "turned out to be one of the best ever given by the quartet", and stated: "Power and inspiration fused in a process of musical creation of the utmost tension... Coltrane and Elvin Jones [performed several] long duets where incredible things happened... McCoy Tyner seems to have taken a definitive step forward as a soloist... A gem were his chord melodies behind Coltrane in Billy Eckstine's pretty ballad 'I Want to Talk About You'; in this piece Coltrane played an outstanding solo coda. A remarkable alteration has happened [in Coltrane's playing], from the Indian-Arabic to a Debussy-Ravel influence..."

In a review for AllMusic, Scott Yanow commented: "Coltrane fans will find these new variations to be of great interest (even if they are not the definitive versions of any of these songs) since the solos vary greatly from the original recordings."

== Track listing ==
All compositions by John Coltrane except where noted. All tracks recorded on October 22, 1963 at Koncerthuset

No.	Title	Length
1.	"The Promise"	6:55
2.	"I Want To Talk About You" (Billy Eckstine)	9:55
3.	"Naima"	6:45
4.	"Mr. P.C."	18:26

== Personnel ==
- John Coltrane – tenor saxophone/soprano saxophone
- McCoy Tyner – piano
- Jimmy Garrison – double bass
- Elvin Jones – drums

Recorded on October 22, 1963 at the Koncerthuset in Stockholm, Sweden.
