= European Tour (disambiguation) =

The PGA European Tour or simply European Tour is a men's professional golf tour.

European Tour may also refer to:

== Sport ==
- Ladies European Tour, a women's professional golf tour
- European Tour (snooker), a series of snooker tournaments, part of the Players Tour Championship
- PDC European Tour, a series of darts tournaments

== Entertainment ==
- The European Tour, a 1980 album by John Coltrane
- PGA European Tour (video game), a 1994 golf game
