= Dan Pugach =

- Born: Ra'anana Israel
- Occupations: Composer; musician; arranger; bandleader
- Years active: 2000–present
- Spouse: Nicole Zuraitis
- Awards: Grammy Award
- Musical career
- Genres: Jazz; big band
- Instrument: Drums
- Label: Outside in Music Label
- Website: danpugach.com

Dan Pugach is an Israeli-American composer, drummer, arranger, and bandleader. He won a Grammy Award in 2025 for Best Large Jazz Ensemble Album for Bianca Reimagined: Music for Paws and Persistence and later that same year was nominated for Best Jazz Performance for All Stars Lead To You - Live and Best Jazz Vocal Album for Live at Vic's Las Vegas for the 68th Annual Grammy Awards in 2026.

== Early life and education ==
Dan Pugach was born in Raanana, Israel. He began playing the drums when he was 11 years old and as a teenager won first prize in the Israeli Jazz Performance Competition. He also won the "Extraordinary Jazz Musician" status acknowledgment by the IDF and was selected to serve three years as the official drummer for the Israeli Air Force Band. During his military service he won a full scholarship to attend Rimon School of Jazz and Contemporary Music. After graduating, Pugach moved to the United States in 2006 after receiving a scholarship to the Berklee College of Music where he earned a Bachelor of Music Degree. He later attended the City College of New York where he received a master's degree in jazz performance.

== Career ==
Pugach performs as the leader of the Dan Pugach Nonet and the Dan Pugach Big Band (featuring Nicole Zuraitis). He won a Grammy Award in 2025 and was nominated for two in subsequent years. He has performed at Dizzy's Club, Birdland Jazz Club, Blue Note Jazz Club, the 55 Bar, and Smalls Jazz Club, as well as performing internationally.

In 2011, Pugach was selected to attend the Betty Carter’s "Jazz Ahead" Residency Program at the Kennedy Center and is a two-time recipient of ASCAP's "Young Jazz Composer" Award. In 2018, Pugach won the BMI Charlie Parker Jazz Competition Prize and was awarded a Manny Albam Commission Grant by the Café Royal Cultural Foundation to complete the Dan Pugach Big Band's second album with an 18-piece jazz orchestra.

In 2025, the Dan Pugach Big Band was listed in DownBeat's Annual Critics Polls as "Rising Star, Large Ensemble of the Year" as well as being awarded a "New Jazz" Grant from Chamber Music America for the Dan Pugach Nonet's 10-piece jazz ensemble. In that same year he was included in CUNY's "50 Under 50" and was the headline act at the Red Sea Jazz Festival in Eilat, Israel.

=== Dan Pugach Big Band (featuring Nicole Zuraitis) ===
Pugach is the leader of the Dan Pugach Big Band. They won a Grammy Award in 2025 for Best Large Jazz Ensemble Album for Bianca Reimagined: Music for Paws and Persistence as well as being nominated for Best Jazz Performance for the album's single, Little Fears, that same year. The band has performed at venues including the Palace Theater and Birdland Jazz Club.

=== Dan Pugach Nonet ===
Pugach is the leader of the Dan Pugach Nonet. In 2018, they released their debut album, Plus One, which received favorable reviews and garnered a fair amount of jazz radio airplay. That same year Pugach was nominated for a Grammy Award for Best Arrangement, Instruments and Vocals for his arrangement of the album's single, Jolene (vocals by Nicole Zuraitis).

== Awards ==
Year	Nominated work	Category	Award	Result
2027	i get along without you very well (except sometimes)	Best Jazz Performance	Grammy Award	Nominated
2026	All Stars Lead To You - Live	Best Jazz Performance	Grammy Award	Nominated
2026	Live at Vic's Las Vegas	Best Jazz Vocal Album	Grammy Award	Nominated
2025	Bianca Reimagined: Music for Paws and Persistence	Best Large Jazz Ensemble Album	Grammy Award	Won
2025	Little Fears	Best Jazz Performance	Grammy Award	Nominated
2019	Bianca	Charlie Parker Composition Prize	BMI	Won
2018	Jolene	Best Arrangement, Instruments and Vocals	Grammy Award	Nominated
2013	Brooklyn Blues	Jazz Composer Award	ASCAP	Won
2011	Discourse This!	Young Jazz Composer Award	ASCAP	Won

== Discography ==
=== As Leader ===
Year	Album	Artist	Credit
2023	Bianca Reimagined (Music For Paws And Persistence)	Dan Pugach Big Band (featuring Nicole Zuraitis)	Producer, composer, arranger, drums, orchestrator
2022	Live at Pinch Recording	Dan Pugach	Arranger, drums
2017	Plus One	Dan Pugach Nonet	Composer, arranger, orchestrator, drums

=== As Guest ===
Year	Album	Artist	Credit
2026	the devil i knew	Nicole Zuraitis	Drums
2025	All Stars Lead To You - Live	Nicole Zuraitis	Drums
2025	Live at Vic's Las Vegas	Nicole Zuraitis	Drums
2025	Siren Songs Volume I and II	Nicole Zuraitis	Drums
2024	How Love Begins	Nicole Zuraitis	Drums
2024	Abstractions	Noshir Mody	Drums
2020	All Wandering Hearts	Nicole Zuraitis	Drums
2019	Tonewheel	Leo Sherman	Drums
2018	Hive Mind	Nicole Zuraitis	Drums
2017	Tramontana	Juan Andrés Ospina	Drums
2017	Selective Coverage	Sam Blakeslee Quintet	Drums
2014	A Day in the Life of Boriz	Jorn Swart	Drums
2014	Yerakina	Banda Magda	Surdo
2014	Dreamland	Ace Elijah	Drums, string arrangements
2009	More to Say (Real Life Story: Nextgen)	Terri Lyne Carrington	Drums

== Personal life ==
Pugach is married to singer Nicole Zuraitis. They are advocates for fostering and rehabilitating Pit bulls.
