= Something Different =

Something Different may refer to:

- Something Different (1920 film), a lost 1920 American silent drama
- Something Different (1963 film), a 1963 Czechoslovak film
- Something Different (play), a 1967 comedy play by Carl Reiner
- "Something Different" (The Flumps), a 1977 children's TV episode

== Music ==
- Something Different (Dexter Gordon album), 1980
- Something Different (Sidewalk Prophets album), 2015
- "Something Different" (Godsmack song), 2014
- "Something Different" (Why Don't We song), 2017
- Something Different!!!!!, a 1963 album by Albert Ayler
- "Something Different", a 1995 song by Shaggy from Boombastic
