= Deborah Silver (jazz singer) =

American jazz singer

- Born: Mississippi, U.S.
- Education: Washington University in St. Louis
- Genre: Jazz
- Occupation: Singer

Deborah Silver is an American jazz singer. She was nominated for a Grammy Award in the category Best Jazz Performance for the album The Lady Is a Tramp.
