= Nicole Zuraitis =

American jazz vocalist, pianist, composer and arranger

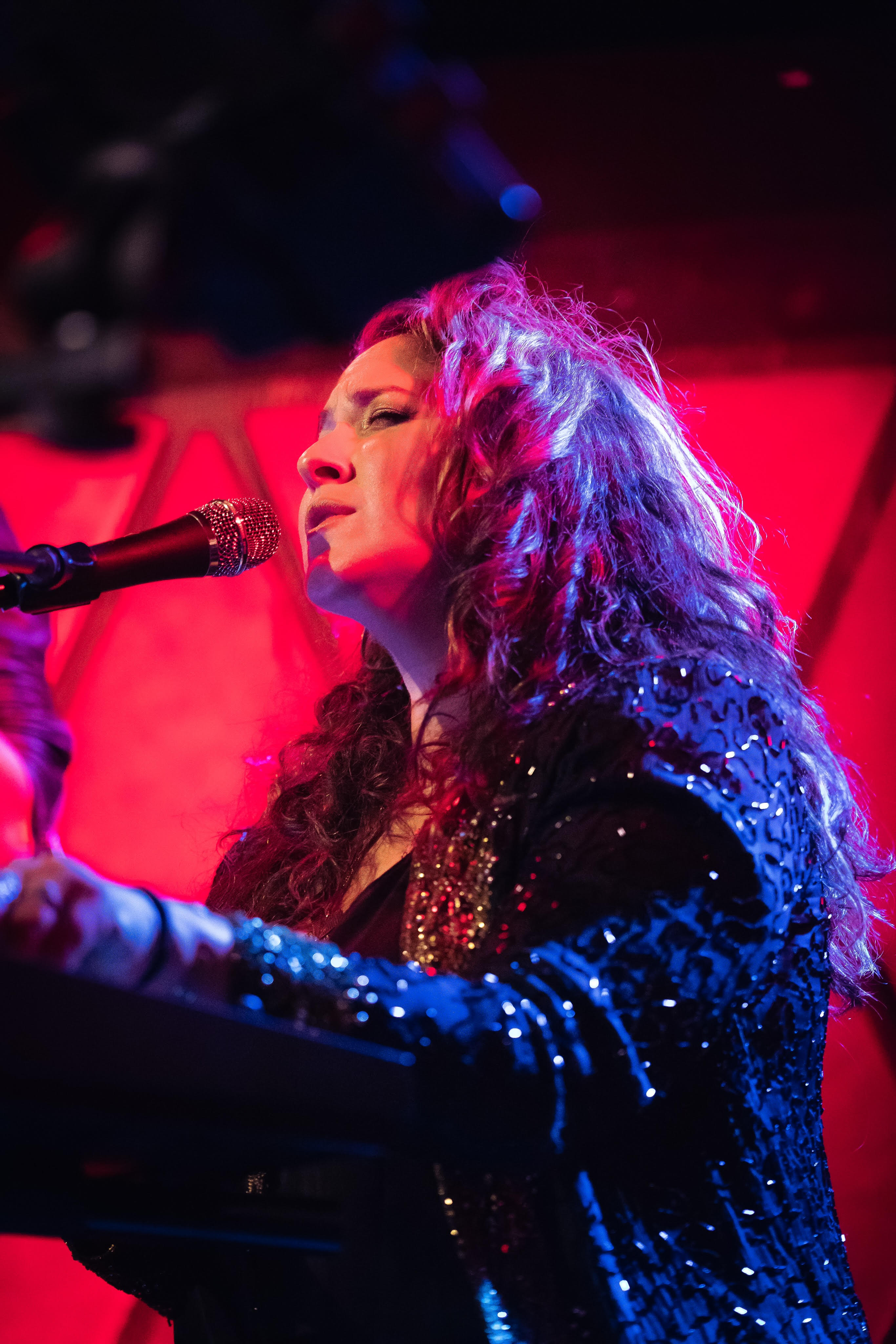
- Born: Waterbury, Connecticut, U.S.
- Occupations: Musician; composer; arranger
- Years active: 2007–present
- Spouse: Dan Pugach
- Awards: Grammy Award
- Musical career
- Genres: Jazz; pop
- Instruments: Piano; vocals
- Website: nicolezmusic.com

Nicole Zuraitis is an American jazz vocalist, pianist, composer, and arranger. She won a Grammy Award in 2024 for Best Jazz Vocal Album for How Love Begins and received additional Grammy nominations in 2019 and 2025. She has collaborated with artists such as Dave Brubeck, Jimmy Carter, Christian McBride, Darren Criss, and Livingston Taylor. In 2026, she was nominated for three Grammy Awards; all that's left for Best Traditional Pop Performance, the devil i knew for Best Jazz Vocal Album, and i get along without you very well (except sometimes) for Best Jazz Performance for the 69th Annual Grammy Awards in 2027.

== Early life and education ==
Nicole Zuraitis was born in Waterbury, Connecticut to parents Brett and Jeanette Zuraitis and is of Lithuanian and Italian decent. She began singing at 11 years of age and played trombone and percussion in middle school. She attended Litchfield public schools and Holy Cross High School in Waterbury, Connecticut where she played competitive soccer until she was injured during a game in France. She was later inducted into the 2020 Crusader Hall of Honor. Zuraitis began to sing jazz with a local community college big band after being encouraged by her high school music director and attended Litchfield Jazz Camp, which she attributes to her early interest in jazz.

Zuraitis studied classical voice at New York University where she graduated with a bachelor's degree in music in 2007 and later earned her master's degree from LSU Shreveport. After a brief period performing opera professionally after graduation, she moved back to New York City to pursue songwriting and jazz in 2009.

== Career ==
Zuraitis has released ten albums: Spread the Word (2008), Pariah Anthem (2012), Hive Mind (2017), Live at Two-Headed Calf (2018) with Brandon Scott Coleman, Cafės & Conversations (2023), How Love Begins (2024), Siren Songs Volumes 1 and 2 (2024), Live at Vic's Las Vegas (2025), and The Devil I Knew (2026). She has recorded on album projects as a co-leader including Sonica (2022) and Bianca Reimagined by the Dan Pugach Big Band (featuring Nicole Zuraitis) (2024).

In 2015, Zuraitis was a runner-up in The Sarah Vaughan International Jazz Vocal Competition. In 2019, she was nominated for a Grammy Award for Best Arrangement, Instruments, and Vocals for her performance of Dolly Parton's Jolene in collaboration with Dan Pugach and in 2024, won a Grammy Award for Best Jazz Vocal Album for How Love Begins. Zuraitis had received a music production grant from the Cafe Royal Cultural Foundation to complete her album, How Love Begins in 2022. In 2025, she was nominated for a Grammy Award for Best Jazz Performance for Little Fears. Zuraitis was included in Connecticut Magazine's Class of 2020's "40 under 40" and was listed in DownBeat's Annual Critics Polls in 2024, 2025, and 2026 as "Rising Star, Female Vocalist of the Year." In 2026, she was a featured speaker at "Women in Music" as part of the Grammy Museum's Grammy Week 2026 Education & Community Engagement.

Zuraitis is a featured vocalist for the Birdland Big Band and has performed at Dizzy's Jazz Club at Lincoln Center, Birdland, the Blue Note Jazz Club, the Carlyle at the Carlyle Hotel, 54 Below and the 55 Bar. She has performed as a featured soloist with the Savannah Philharmonic Orchestra, Asheville Symphony Orchestra, and Macon Pops and has accompanied singers including Jon Batiste, Melanie, and Morgan Jameson piano and vocals.

== Awards ==
| Year | Nominated work | Category | Award | Result |
|---|---|---|---|---|
| 2027 | all that's left | Best Traditional Pop Performance | Grammy Award | Nominated |
| 2027 | i get along without you very well (except sometimes) | Best Jazz Performance | Grammy Award | Nominated |
| 2027 | the devil i knew | Best Jazz Vocal Album | Grammy Award | Nominated |
| 2026 | All Stars Lead to You - Live | Best Jazz Performance | Grammy Award | Nominated |
| 2026 | Live at Vic's Las Vegas | Best Jazz Vocal Album | Grammy Award | Nominated |
| 2026 | | Female Vocalist of the Year | JJA Jazz Award | Nominated |
| 2026 | | Rising Star, Female Vocalist of the Year | DownBeat's Annual Critics Polls | Won |
| 2026 | | Artist of the Year (Jazz/Blues) | Josie Music Award | Won |
| 2025 | Bianca Reimagined: Music For Paws And Persistence | Best Large Jazz Ensemble Album | Grammy Award | Won |
| 2025 | Little Fears | Best Jazz Performance | Grammy Award | Nominated |
| 2025 | | Rising Star, Female Vocalist of the Year | DownBeat's Annual Critics Polls | Won |
| 2024 | How Love Begins | Best Jazz Vocal Album | Grammy Award | Won |
| 2024 | | Female Vocalist of the Year | JJA Jazz Award | Nominated |
| 2024 | | Rising Star, Female Vocalist of the Year | DownBeat's Annual Critics Polls | Won |
| 2024 | Birdland Jazz | Best Big Band/Swing Show | BroadwayWorld Cabaret Award | Won |
| 2021 | | Vocal Competition | American Tradition Vocal Competition | Won |
| 2019 | Jolene | Best Arrangement, Instrumental and Vocals | Grammy Award | Nominated |
| 2014 | | Herb Alpert Young Composer Award | ASCAP | Won |

== Discography ==
=== As leader ===
- the devil i knew (2026)
- All Stars Lead to You - Live (2025)
- Live at Vic's Las Vegas (2025)
- How Love Begins (Extended Edition 2024)
- How Love Begins (2024)
- Cafės & Conversations (2023)
- All Wandering Hearts (2020)
- Live at Two-Headed Calf - with Brandon Scott Coleman (2018)
- Hive Mind (2017)
- Pariah Anthem (2012)
- Spread the Word (2008)

=== As group ===
- Take Some Air – EVA (2015)
- Sonica– (with Thana Alexa, Julia Adamy, Nicole Zuraitis) (2022)
- Bianca Reimagined - Dan Pugach Big Band (featuring Nicole Zuraitis) (2024)

=== As guest ===
- Last Sunday in Plains: A Centennial Celebration - Jimmy Carter (2024)
- Ona – Thana Alexa (Independent, 2020)
- Plus One – Dan Pugach Nonet (2018)
- Day Dream – Carmen Staaf Sextet (2017)
- Wishes on a Neon Sign – Abbie Gardner (2017)
- Come to Paradise – Suzanne Dean (2016)

== Personal life ==
Zuraitis is married to drummer and composer Dan Pugach and they reside in Connecticut. They both are advocates for fostering and rehabilitating pit bulls.

Zuraitis is a jazz vocal instructor at Litchfield Jazz Camp.
