= My Name Is Albert Ayler =

Studio album by Albert Ayler
- Released: 1964
- Recorded: January 14, 1963 at the Danish National Radio Studios, Copenhagen, Denmark
- Genre: Free jazz
- Length: 44:38
- Label: Debut (Denmark) DEB 140
- Producer: Ole Vestegaard Jensen

Albert Ayler chronology
Something Different!!!!! (1963)	My Name Is Albert Ayler (1964)	Ghosts (1965)

My Name Is Albert Ayler is an album by American free jazz saxophonist Albert Ayler recorded in Copenhagen in 1963 and first released on the Dutch Debut label. The album, on which Ayler is accompanied by Niels Brosted (piano), Niels-Henning Ørsted Pedersen (bass), and Ronnie Gardiner (drums), features a spoken introduction by Ayler, followed by five musical tracks, mostly standards. "C.T.", the only Ayler original, is dedicated to Cecil Taylor, whom Ayler had met and performed with several months prior. (Ayler had hoped to record the album with Taylor's group, but ended up playing with Brosted, Pedersen, and Gardiner due to scheduling conflicts.) "Bye Bye Blackbird" represents one of Ayler's few recordings on soprano saxophone.

== Reception ==
Professional ratings
Review scores
Source	Rating
Allmusic	3/5 stars
The Rolling Stone Jazz Record Guide	4/5 stars

The Allmusic review by Thom Jurek awarded the album 3 stars, stating "This is a strange record, like a soloist mismatched with the recording of another band", and noting that "the rhythm section refuses to give Ayler the room he needs: they play straight bop no matter what, as if they couldn't play anything else." However, he praised Ayler's "singular tenor voice", and called "Summertime" "unfathomably beautiful", commenting: "he connect(s) with the inner voices of his emotions and lets loose in what would become his trademark wail. Born equally of gospel, R&B, and early jazz phrasing, Ayler lets loose a torrent of emotion on the tune, making everything -- and everyone on the bandstand -- else seem nonexistent in comparison."

Val Wilmer called Ayler's playing on "Summertime" "a passionate expression of almost unbelievable pathos. His dramatic swoops and masterly shading recall the sweeping glissandi of Johnny Hodges, while the completeness of his statement gives the lie to the notion that he was going through an 'experimental' period."

Amiri Baraka commented: "Ayler plays with a surprisingly good rhythm section made up of two Danes and an American (Gardiner) who's been playing around the Scandinavian countries for a few years. Albert's work on soprano is almost as valuable as his work on tenor (dig 'Summertime' and 'Green Dolphin Street'). The bassist, Orsted Pedersen, shows up very well on this album... his playing on 'C.T.' is very fine (Ayler's fantastic)."

Writing for SoundBlab, Rich Morris called the album "A true lost classic... My Name Is... may not be viewed as Albert Ayler's definitive work... but it is a classic recording made by a true visionary at the top of his game and contains transcendental majesty and searing beauty, in amongst a whole lot of sronking, grooving, astoundingly improvised be-bop... Ayler's playing is just beyond anything that could be called mere musicianship. He's wildly expressive without wasting a note, never putting a foot wrong even as he disregards conventional notions of melody and structure." He concluded: "people younger and cooler than me must hear this album. We must wrestle their piddling false icons from them, make a bonfire of the Gagas, Coldplays and whatever skinny-jeaned bore-fest is on the cover of this week's NME, and play them My Name is Albert Ayler on repeat, until they are also brave enough to put their name to music as wild, free and elemental. And we must do so quickly before the spark which created such music recedes forever to out-of-print albums and half-forgotten history."

Bassist and Ayler biographer Jeff Schwartz noted that My Name is Albert Ayler exhibits some of the same flaws found on its predecessor, Something Different!!!!! in that, for example, his use of the pick-up musicians limited him to playing mostly standards, and commented that the presence of a pianist "seems to prevent Ayler from breaking free of them to follow his imagination." However, Schwartz noted that the album demonstrates that, by this point in time, Ayler had established "a consistent, unique musical style. In his playing on this session, he presents most of the elements that his later work would be built from."

== Track listing ==
1. Introduction by Albert Ayler - 1:15
2. "Bye Bye Blackbird" (Mort Dixon, Ray Henderson) - 7:19
3. "Billie's Bounce" (Charlie Parker) - 5:59
4. "Summertime" (George Gershwin, Ira Gershwin, DuBose Heyward) - 8:46
5. "On Green Dolphin Street" (Bronisław Kaper, Ned Washington) - 9:05
6. "C.T." (Albert Ayler) - 12:01

== Personnel ==
- Albert Ayler - tenor saxophone (tracks 3–6), soprano saxophone (track 2), voice (track 1)
- Niels Brosted - piano (tracks 2–5)
- Niels-Henning Ørsted Pedersen - bass (tracks 2–6)
- Ronnie Gardiner - drums (tracks 2–6)
