= Rosa Nachmanson =

Swedish philanthropist

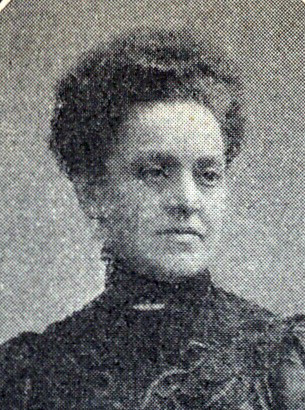
Rosa Nachmanson

Rosalie (Rosa) Nachmanson née Davidson (20 March 1852 – 9 November 1916) was a Swedish philanthropist and charity worker. She was the daughter of conditor Wilhelm Davidson who opened the known restaurant Hasselbacken in Stockholm in the mid-1800s.

Nachmanson was an active philanthropist throughout her life, and made her home a center for artists. After her death she left a fortune of 3.5 million (SEK). Half of the money was to be handed over to people close to her and the rest was to be given to several charity health care causes. Nachmanson was one of the biggest donors to the construction of the Stockholm Concert Hall through her will.
