= Bye Bye Blackbird (John Coltrane album) =

Live album by John Coltrane
- Released: 1981
- Recorded: November 19, 1962
- Venue: Konserthuset, Stockholm
- Genre: Avant-garde jazz Modal jazz Hard bop
- Label: Pablo Records

Bye Bye Blackbird is a live album by jazz musician John Coltrane recorded on November 19, 1962 at the Konserthuset in Stockholm and released in 1981 by Pablo Records.

The album was recorded during a 1962 European tour which took place from November 17 - December 2, and which included stops in Paris, Zurich, Stockholm, Helsinki, Oslo, Copenhagen, Berlin, Hamburg, Vienna, Graz, Munich, Frankfurt am Main, Scheveningen, Amsterdam, and Milan. The Coltrane quartet played two concerts at the Konserthuset on November 19; "Traneing In" was recorded at the first concert, while "Bye Bye Blackbird" was recorded at the second. Material from these concerts and others that took place during the tour were released in 2001 on the 7–CD collection Live Trane: The European Tours.

== Reception ==
Professional ratings
Review scores
Source	Rating
The Penguin Guide to Jazz	3.5/4 stars
The Rolling Stone Jazz Record Guide	4/5 stars
AllMusic	4/5 stars

In a review for AllMusic, Scott Yanow wrote: "Bye Bye Blackbird only contains 36 minutes of music, but the quality is quite high. John Coltrane and his Quartet... perform extended versions of "Bye Bye Blackbird" and "Traneing In" that gradually build up to great intensity. Well recorded, this European concert... is worth hearing, particularly by Coltrane collectors who already have his more essential recordings."

Chris May, writing for All About Jazz, called the performances "incandescent," and stated that Coltrane's solo on "Traneing In" is "among the most thrilling he ever recorded, live or in the studio."

Coltrane was posthumously awarded the 1981 Grammy Award for Best Jazz Instrumental Performance, Soloist for Bye Bye Blackbird.

== Track listing ==
Original CD release Bye Bye Blackbird (Pablo)

1. "Bye Bye Blackbird" (Ray Henderson / Mort Dixon) – 17:50
2. "Traneing In" (John Coltrane) – 18:40

Recorded on November 19, 1962 in Stockholm, Sweden.

== Personnel ==
- John Coltrane – tenor saxophone/soprano saxophone
- McCoy Tyner – piano
- Jimmy Garrison – double bass
- Elvin Jones – drums
