= 55 Bar =

Jazz club in New York City

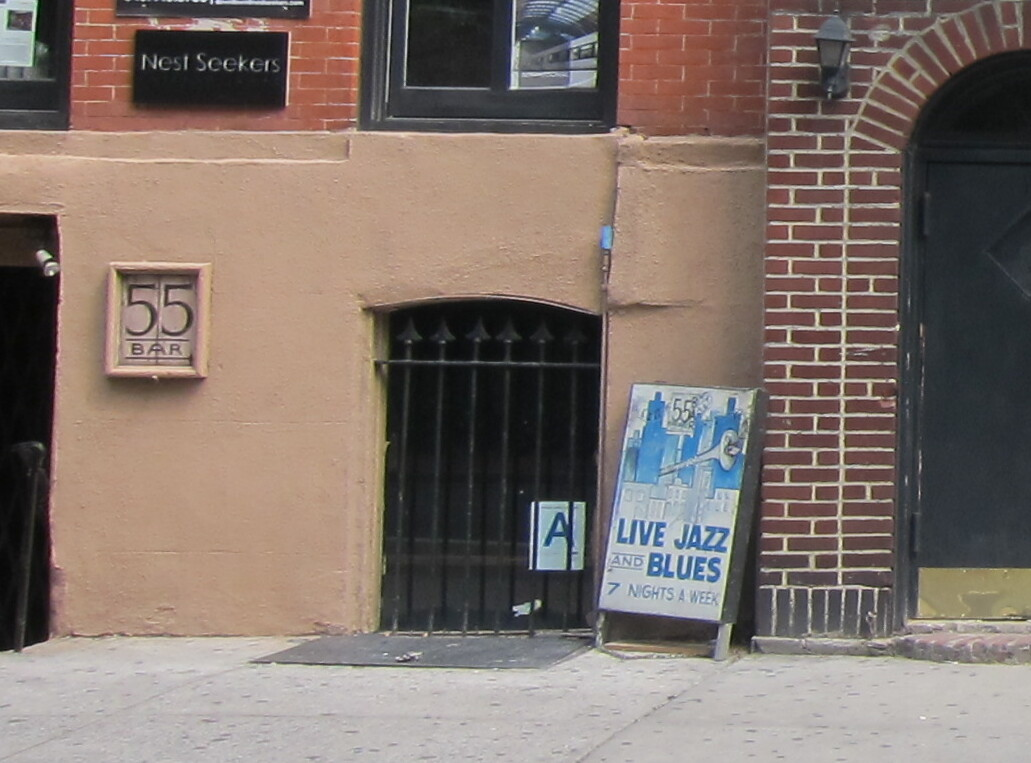
- The 55 Bar in 2012
- Interactive map of 55 Bar
- Address: 55 Christopher Street; Manhattan, New York; United States
- Coordinates: 40.7338°N 74.0023°W
- Type: Bar

Construction
- Opened: 1919
- Closed: 2022
- Years active: 1983–2022

The 55 Bar was a bar and jazz club located at 55 Christopher Street in the Greenwich Village neighborhood of Manhattan in New York City. The bar was established in 1919 and operated as a speakeasy during the Prohibition era. The bar began jazz performances in 1983. The venue closed in 2022 after the COVID-19 pandemic. Musicians with regular shows at the bar included Jeff Michael Andrews, Mike and Leni Stern, and Wayne Krantz.

== History ==
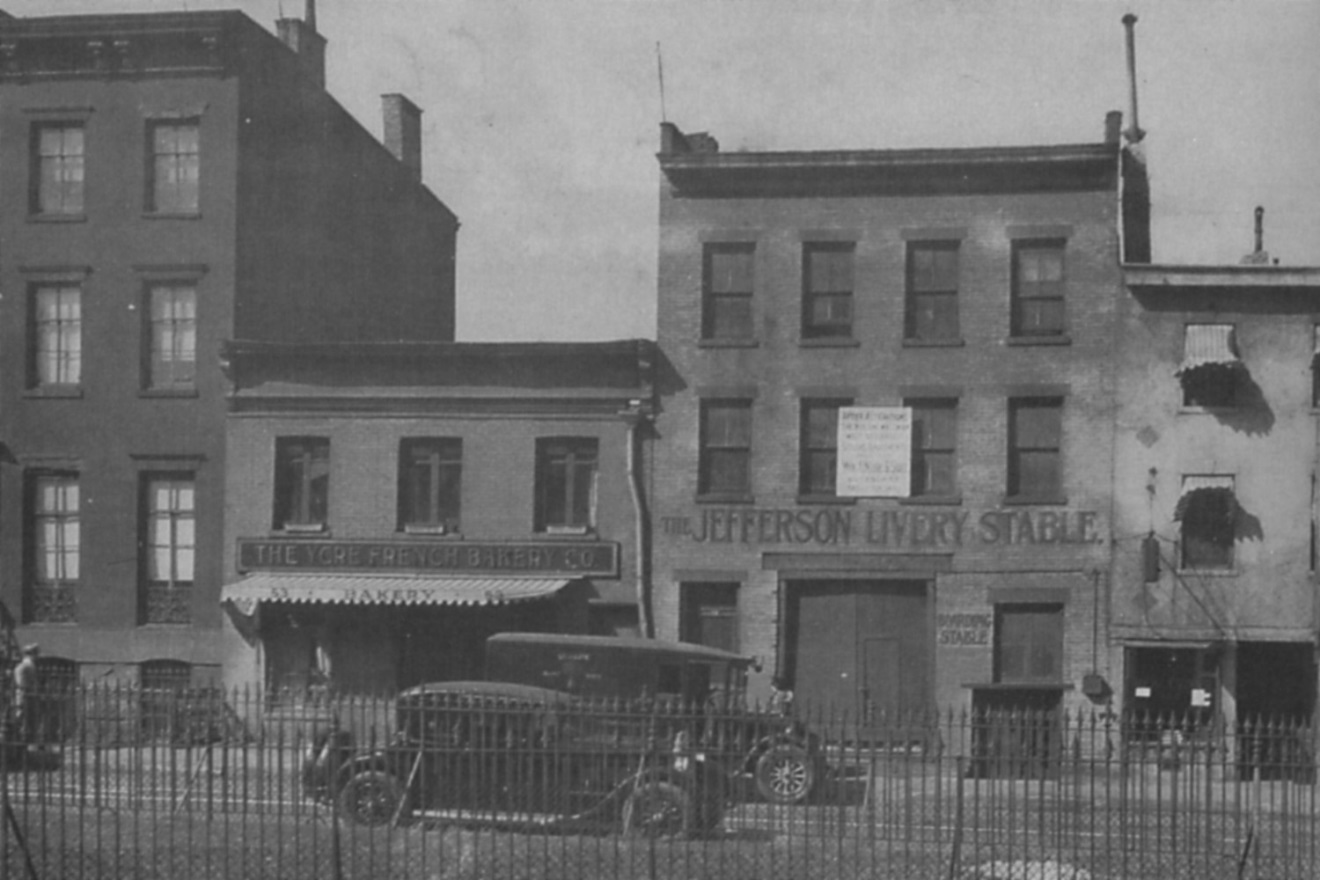
55 Christopher Street (far left) in 1928

The 55 Bar was established in 1919 by Hyman Satenstein. According to one account, Satenstein, who was returning from fighting in World War I, received the property by gambling in a card game. Shortly after the bar opened, the United States banned alcohol. Satenstein illegally operated it as a speakeasy until the ban was lifted and he received a liquor license. The bar was acquired in the 1960s by Bradley Cunningham, who would later open a jazz club, Bradley's. Before the 55 Bar became a jazz club, many local jazz musicians were customers.

The 55 Bar was acquired in 1981 by Peter Williams. It began featuring jazz in 1983. Daily performances were initially open to the public and were not paid. Jazz shows began when bassist Jeff Michael Andrews asked Williams if he could perform at the bar. Andrews invited guitarist Mike Stern, who began performing at the venue fortnightly until its closure. Stern's wife, Leni Stern, also began a residency there. In the 1980s, the 55 Bar largely featured guitar-heavy jazz fusion. It participated in the Greenwich Village Jazz Festival annually from 1986 to 1989. The bar gained a reputation for hosting talented jazz musicians in a dive bar atmosphere. Guitarist Wayne Krantz performed there beginning in the 1990s. Writer Steve Dollar credited the bar as the place where Norah Jones was discovered. Jones had visited the bar in 1999 as a new resident of New York City, where she met guitarist Adam Levy, with whom she formed her backing band.

Queva Lutz acquired the 55 Bar in 2001. She aimed for the venue to have a higher profile and to feature innovative music, citing the example of the Village Vanguard. Lutz, who booked all the venue's performers, began to feature emerging musicians in free early shows before the late-night shows with established artists. Lutz died in 2007 and her son, Scott Ellard, owned the bar until its closure. In 2014, David Bowie visited the bar at the recommendation of jazz musician Maria Schneider and saw a performance by Donny McCaslin's quartet. He invited the group to collaborate on his final album, Blackstar.

The 55 Bar was closed for fourteen months during the COVID-19 lockdowns. It could not keep up with the cost of real estate in New York City. The bar held benefit concerts, and a GoFundMe campaign raised $61,000, but it was unable to recover its lost revenue. It closed permanently on May 23, 2022. Over 100 people attended on the final day. After the final performance, featuring Paul Jost, people gathered outside and a 16-member brass band played until the police dispersed the crowd. The COVID-19 pandemic in New York City had caused the closure of several other jazz clubs, including the Jazz Standard.

== Venue ==
The 55 Bar was located in the basement of 55 Christopher Street, at the crossing with Seventh Avenue, between the Stonewall Inn and the Lion's Head tavern. It did not serve food, and it maintained a one drink minimum. Lutz described the 55 Bar as an "old fashioned jazz club". It was a small venue that became familiar to its musicians, enabling them to share ideas with each other.
