= Afro Blue Impressions =

Live album by John Coltrane
- Released: May/June 1977
- Recorded: October 22, 1963; Konserthuset, Stockholm; November 2, 1963; Auditorium Maximum, Freie Universität Berlin, Berlin
- Genre: Hard bop, modal jazz, avant-garde jazz
- Length: 97:34
- Label: Pablo Records; 2620-101
- Producer: Norman Granz

John Coltrane chronology
The European Tour (1963)	Afro Blue Impressions (1977)	The Paris Concert (1963)

Alternative cover
- Reissue

Afro Blue Impressions is an album of a performance by jazz musician John Coltrane that was recorded live in 1963. The album was originally released many years later, in 1977, on the Pablo label, as a double LP.

== Reception ==
The AllMusic review by Scott Yanow awarded the album 4 stars: "No new revelations occur, but this is a strong all-around set of Trane near his peak."

== Reissue ==
In 2013, the album was re-released under the title Afro Blue Impressions (Remastered and Expanded). This re-release won the Grammy Award for Best Album Notes.

Professional ratings
Review scores
Source	Rating
Allmusic	4/5 stars
The Penguin Guide to Jazz	4/4 stars
The Rolling Stone Jazz Record Guide	5/5 stars

== Track listing ==
All compositions by John Coltrane except as indicated.

Disc 1
No.	Title	Recording date and venue	Length
1.	"Lonnie's Lament"	November 2, 1963, Free University of Berlin Auditorium	10:16
2.	"Naima"	November 2, 1963, Free University of Berlin Auditorium	8:06
3.	"Chasin' the Trane"	November 2, 1963, Free University of Berlin Auditorium	5:48
4.	"My Favorite Things" (Oscar Hammerstein II, Richard Rodgers)	November 2, 1963, Free University of Berlin Auditorium	21:10

Disc 2
No.	Title	Recording date and venue	Length
1.	"Afro Blue" (Mongo Santamaria)	November 2, 1963, Free University of Berlin Auditorium	7:43
2.	"Cousin Mary"	November 2, 1963, Free University of Berlin Auditorium	9:55
3.	"I Want to Talk About You" (Billy Eckstine)	November 2, 1963, Free University of Berlin Auditorium	8:20
4.	"Spiritual"	October 22, 1963, Stockholm Concert Hall	12:30
5.	"Impressions"	October 22, 1963, Stockholm Concert Hall	11:36

== Personnel ==
- John Coltrane — tenor saxophone, soprano saxophone
- McCoy Tyner — piano
- Jimmy Garrison — double bass
- Elvin Jones — drums
