= The Paris Concert (John Coltrane album) =

Live album by John Coltrane
- Released: 1979
- Recorded: 1962 or 1963
- Label: Pablo

The Paris Concert is a posthumously-released live album by jazz musician John Coltrane. Despite the album title, some sources assert it was recorded at a concert in Berlin on 2 November 1963. Other music from this concert was issued on Afro Blue Impressions. Others claim it was indeed recorded in Paris, on 17 November 1962.

== Reception ==
Professional ratings
Review scores
Source	Rating
The Penguin Guide to Jazz Recordings	3/4 stars
The Rolling Stone Jazz Record Guide	3/5 stars
AllMusic	4/5 stars

In a review for AllMusic, Scott Yanow called the album "excellent" and wrote: "Although the sound and passion of the group on this date will not surprise veteran listeners, it is always interesting to hear new variations of songs already definitively recorded in the studios. The Paris Concert is recommended to all true Coltrane fanatics."

== Track listing ==
No.	Title	Recording venue and date	Length
1.	"Mr. P.C." (John Coltrane)	Salle Pleyel, November 1, 1963	26:17
2.	"The Inchworm" (Frank Loesser)	L'Olympia, November 17, 1962	10:07
3.	"Everytime We Say Goodbye" (Cole Porter)	L'Olympia, November 17, 1962	4:48

== Personnel ==
- John Coltrane — tenor saxophone/soprano saxophone
- McCoy Tyner — piano
- Jimmy Garrison — double bass
- Elvin Jones — drums
