= Jeff Michael Andrews =

American jazz musician (1960–2019)

Jeff Michael Andrews (January 20, 1960 – March 14, 2019) was an American jazz and jazz fusion bassist who contributed significantly to jazz fusion in the 1980s. He taught at the Manhattan School of Music, SUNY Purchase, The New School and Mannes School of Music and collaborated with a number of musicians.

== Discography ==
- 1985: Special EFX, Modern Manners.
- 1986: Kenneth Sivertsen, High Tide. Jeff Andrews: Bass.
- 1986: Kramer Daniels, Sleepover. Jeff Andrews: Bass
- 1986: Mike Stern, Upside down. Jeff Andrews: Bass.
- 1986: Special EFX, Slice of Life.
- 1987: Jukkis Uotila, Avenida Stunt
- 1987: Bob Berg, Bob Berg, Denon.
- 1987: Bob Berg, Short Stories. Jeff Andrews: Bass, Composer.
- 1987: Special EFX, Mystique.
- 1988: Bireli Lagrene, Foreign Affairs, Blue Note.
- 1988: Bob Berg, Cycles. Jeff Andrews: Electric Bass.
- 1988: Earth City Expressway. Jeff Andrews: Bass
- 1988: Michael Brecker Band, Live in Berlin, German Independent.
- 1988: Michael Brecker, Don't Try This At Home. Jeff Andrews: Guest Artist, Bass (Electric), Bass
- 1988: Mike Stern, Time And Place. Jeff Andrews: Bass (Electric), Fretless Bass, Bass, Guitar (Bass)
- 1989: Mike Stern, Jigsaw. Jeff Andrews: Bass (Electric), Fretless Bass, Guitar (Bass), Guitar (Electric)
- 1990: GRP New Magic Digital Sampler, Vol. 3. Jeff Andrews: Bass
- 1990: Joe Locke, Longing, Steeple Chase.
- 1990: Kenneth Sivertsen, Flo. Jeff Andrews: Bass
- 1991: Eliane Alias, A Long Story. Jeff Andrews: Bass
- 1991: Haru Takuchi, 10 Billion Stars, Toshiba EMI.
- 1992: Blue Guitar. Jeff Andrews: Bass (Electric)
- 1992: Bob Mintzer, I Remember Jaco. Jeff Andrews: Bass (Electric), Guitar (Bass), Guitar (Electric)
- 1992: Haru Takuchi with Wayne Shorter, The Galactic Age. Jeff Andrews: Bass (Electric)
- 1992: Jimi Tunnel, Jimi Tunnel.
- 1992: Steps Ahead, Yin Yang. Jeff Andrews: Bass, Bass (Acoustic), Bass (Electric)
- 1992: Vital Information, Easier Done Than Said. Jeff Andrews: Keyboards, Bass, Composer
- 1993: Special EFX, Special EFX Collection. Jeff Andrews: Bass
- 1993: Terri & Monica, Systa: Jeff Andrews: Bass
- 1993: Weller Bros., Coast to Coast. Jeff Andrews: Bass
- 1994: Carola Grey, The Age of Illusions. Jeff Andrews: Bass
- 1994: Joe Locke, Longing. Jeff Andrews: Bass
- 1994: Tom Coster, The Forbidden Zone. Jeff Andrews: Bass, Bass (Electric)
- 1995: Jazz Á Go-Go 1995. Jeff Andrews: Bass
- 1995: Matalex, Wild Indian Summer. Jeff Andrews: Bass
- 1996: Mike Stern, Between The Lines. Jeff Andrews: Bass, Guitar (Bass)
- 1996: Vital Information, Ray of Hope. Jeff Andrews: Bass, Composer
- 1997: Babatunde Olatunji, Love Drum Talk. Jeff Andrews: Main Personnel, Bass (Electric), Fretless Bass, Bass
- 1997: Yule Be Boppin'. Jeff Andrews: Guitar (Electric)
- 1998: Birth of Cool Funk Vintage Jams, Boxed Set. Jeff Andrews: Bass (Electric)
- 1998: Vital information, where we come from. Jeff Andrews: Bass (Acoustic), Bass (Electric), Composer
- 1999: The Blue Note Years, Vol. 7: Blue Note Now & Then. Jeff Andrews: Composer
- 2000: Debbie Deane, Debbie Deane. Jeff Andrews: Bass
- 2000: Vital Information, Live Around the World: Where We Come from Tour 1998-1999. Jeff Andrews: Composer
- 2001: Joe Rathbone, Welcome to Your New Life. Jeff Andrews: Bass
- 2001: Studio X: Live Denver. Jeff Andrews: Bass
- 2003: Dreamzfate, Pound That Rock. Jeff Andrews: Engineer, Mixing
- 2005: Jimi Tunnell, Trilateral Commission. Jeff Andrews: Bass (Electric), Guitar (Bass), Main Personnel
- 2006: Blues Divine / Philippo Franchini, That's What It Takes. Jeff Andrews: Percussion
- 2006: Michael Brecker, Michael Brecker Band in Japan. Jeff Andrews: Bass
- 2007: Debbie Dean, Grove House. Jeff Andrews: Audio Production, Bass, Guitar (Bass), Main Personnel, Producer
- 2008: Ironweed, Indian Ladder. Jeff Andrews: Member of Attributed Artist, Vocals
- 2009: Blues Devine, Shine like the Sun. Jeff Andrews: Percussion
- 2009: Danny Paradise, Travelers, Magicians & Shamans. Jeff Andrews: Bass, Bass Engineer, Bass (Electric), Percussion, Percussion Engineer
- 2010: Dave Stringer, Joyride. Jeff Andrews: Guitar (Acoustic), Bouzouki, Hammer Dulcimer
