= Something Different!!!!! =

American jazz album recorded in 1962

Studio album by Albert Ayler
- Released: 1963
- Recorded: October 25, 1962
- Venue: Academy of Music, Stockholm, Sweden
- Genre: Jazz
- Label: Bird Notes
- Producer: Bengt Nordström

Albert Ayler chronology
| Something Different!!!!! (1963) | My Name Is Albert Ayler (1964) |

Something Different!!!!! is an album by the American jazz saxophonist Albert Ayler recorded on October 25, 1962 at the Academy of Music in Stockholm, Sweden, and originally released in very small quantities on the Swedish Bird Notes label run by saxophonist Bengt "Frippe" Nordström. Ayler plays tenor saxophone (and piano for several bars on one track) and is accompanied by Swedish musicians Torbjörn Hultcrantz (bass) and Sune Spångberg (drums).

The album was later reissued on various labels, including Sonet, GNP Crescendo, Stateside, and DIW, under the titles The First Recordings and The First Recordings Vol. 1. Four additional tracks from the same recording session were released as The First Recordings Vol. 2. The contents of both albums were combined and released on CD in 2018 by the Go! Bop! label and on vinyl by the Alternative Fox label.

== Background ==
In the spring of 1962, Ayler, who had been living in Cleveland, traveled to New York City, and then to Stockholm, Sweden, in the hope of finding an environment receptive to his music. While in Sweden, he performed with commercial bands and played on the streets and in the subway. Despite his optimism, when playing his own style of music, his unusual approach alienated audiences and many of his fellow musicians. At some point, however, Ayler befriended Bengt "Frippe" Nordström, a saxophonist and jazz promoter who was sympathetic to his music, and who began promoting Ayler, taking him to clubs and introducing him to other players. Eventually, Nordström, who ran a very small, poorly-distributed record label called Bird Notes, convinced Ayler to make a record. Ayler recalled his reluctance: "You know, that first record I made... A Swedish guy, he gave me the break to make a record. I said, 'Maybe I shouldn't make it.' He said, 'Come on, it won't hurt you,' and then I made that record..."

On October 25, 1962, Ayler brought bassist Torbjörn Hultcrantz and drummer Sune Spångberg, with whom he had been playing for months, to the Main Hall of the Academy of Music in Stockholm, where, in front of an audience of twenty-five people, they recorded twelve tracks, mostly standards. (Four of these tracks are unreleased.) The recordings were intended for private distribution only. Regarding his playing during the session, Ayler stated: "I had been playing music like that a long time ago... Spacing sound, just trying to work with sound, spacing that sound, you know? And that was even more different than the rhythm, playing the actual rhythm at that time, but I developed a rhythmic type of free-form which was very important. I developed a space type of rhythmic music..."

A number of writers have noted the fact that Hultcrantz and Spångberg do not appear to be in sync with Ayler's approach to music. Val Wilmer wrote that they were "oblivious to his conception from start to finish," while bassist and writer Jeff Schwartz commented on the opposition of Ayler's "totally stream-of-consciousness playing to the conventional work of his sidemen," and wrote that "the bassist 'walks' the chord changes in 4/4 most of the time, and it is unintentionally hilarious to hear Ayler play phrases constructed from pure noise, only to be answered by heavy-handed bop-style 'bomb dropping' on the drumset". However, Ayler soon encountered musicians who were more sympathetic to his cause, such as Don Cherry, with whom he would later make a number of recordings, and the members of the Cecil Taylor Unit, which featured Taylor on piano, Jimmy Lyons on alto saxophone, and Sunny Murray on drums. According to Murray, after hearing Taylor's group perform, Ayler approached them in a state of excitement, saying "I've been waiting for you, man. You're the guys I've been waiting for." Two days after the record date, Ayler performed in Stockholm with Taylor's group, and on November 16, the Unit, with Ayler, recorded the track "Four," featured on the Ayler box set Holy Ghost. The following month they recorded together for Danish television as the Cecil Taylor Unit, and they continued to play together on and off through 1964.

In January 1963, Ayler recorded My Name Is Albert Ayler in Denmark for the Debut label. A few months later, he returned to Cleveland, where, according to Val Wilmer, he was "a loner in his hometown," having little opportunity to play, and selling copies of Something Different!!!!! on street corners. Later that year, he moved to New York City, where he reunited with Cherry and Taylor, and found other musicians more receptive to his playing.

== Reception ==
Professional ratings
Review scores
| Source | Rating |
|---|---|
| AllMusic | 1.5/5 stars |
| The Penguin Guide to Jazz | 3/4 stars |

In his AllMusic reviews of The First Recordings, Vol. 1, Scott Yanow wrote: "The problem with the trio recordings heard on this LP is that bassist Torbjörn Hultcrantz and drummer Sune Spångberg sound as if they are completely ignoring what tenor saxophonist Albert Ayler is playing. While Ayler improvises quite freely... Ayler's sidemen just play conventionally, never reacting to the tenor's flights or any of his ideas. It is a pity, for the lack of interplay weighs down what could have been an innovative outing." Similarly, his review of Volume 2 states: "This should have been a memorable and possibly innovative session... Unfortunately, the Swedish sidemen... completely ignore what Ayler is playing and just act as if they were backing a conventional bop musician. The lack of communication between the musicians defeats this effort, although Ayler collectors will find the results quite interesting."

The authors of the Penguin Guide to Jazz Recordings commented: "The first recordings are astonishly sparse... what is immediately distinctive about Ayler is the almost hypnotic depth of his concentration on a single motif, which he repeats, worries, splinters into constituent harmonics... Ayler's impatience with bop is evident throughout, and for all their unrelieved starkness, these rather solitary experiments are still remarkably refreshing."

Jeff Schwartz wrote: "What was it that these three men did, in an almost empty auditorium... that was so different?... It is the way that Ayler plays these songs that is revolutionary, not the selection of songs or the style of the accompaniment... Ayler... totally rejects the aesthetic criteria of bebop... [he insists] on following his improvisations wherever they might lead, regardless of the form of the song. He never plays the themes 'straight', but the theme is always present in his soloing. His main improvisational strategy is to find the 'hook' of the song, the melodic phrase that is the catchiest, or most intriguing, and elaborate on it by free association." Schwartz also noted: "Something that this recording establishes conclusively is Ayler's total mastery of the saxophone... Albert used a wide bore metal mouthpiece with an incredibly hard Fibercane #4 plastic reed in order to produce the loudest, fullest, and most malleable sound ever to emerge from a saxophone. Because he was moving such a large mass of air through his horn, Albert Ayler was able to shape the harmonic content of each note he played. Like a guitarist using feedback, he was able to produce notes far beyond the normal range of the tenor sax simply by exaggerating the higher partials in the tone of a normal pitch. Also, there are moments in his second solo in 'I'll Remember April' when Albert Ayler executes multiphonics, groups of four and five notes at the same time, with a richness and evenness that far exceeds even Coltrane's work in that area. This second solo also contains phrases in which all the sounds are produced in unconventional ways, displaying a fluidity of technique that Coltrane would struggle for the last two years of his life to try to make his own. In 'Tune Up,' Ayler's duck-like slap-tonguing and vocalizing of his improvised horn lines anticipate Anthony Braxton's work on, say, his Solo Alto Saxophone Improvisations 1979 album." Schwartz concluded: "While this session has many faults, it is an auspicious beginning. Despite his obvious inexperience, drifting off mike on several occasions, Ayler was able to rise above his circumstances and create."

== Track listings ==
Something Different!!!!! (Bird Notes, 1963) and The First Recordings Vol. 1 (Sonet, 1969)

1. "I'll Remember April" (de Paul, Raye, Johnston) - 17:41
2. "Rollins' Tune" (actually "No Moe") (Sonny Rollins) - 7:09
3. "Tune Up" (Miles Davis) - 5:33
4. "Free" (Albert Ayler) - 9:47

The First Recordings Vol. 2 (Bird Notes, 1962)

1. "Softly, as in a Morning Sunrise" (Romberg, Hammerstein) - 8:18
2. "I Didn't Know What Time It Was" (Rodgers, Hart) - 7:43
3. "Moanin'" (Bobby Timmons) - 10:13
4. "Good Bait" (Dameron, Basie) - 6:48
- Recorded October 25, 1962, at the Main Hall of the Academy of Music, Stockholm.

== Personnel ==
- Albert Ayler - tenor saxophone, piano on "I'll Remember April"
- Torbjörn Hultcrantz - bass
- Sune Spångberg - drums
