= Stockholm Concert Hall =

Coordinates: 59°20′06″N 18°03′47″E

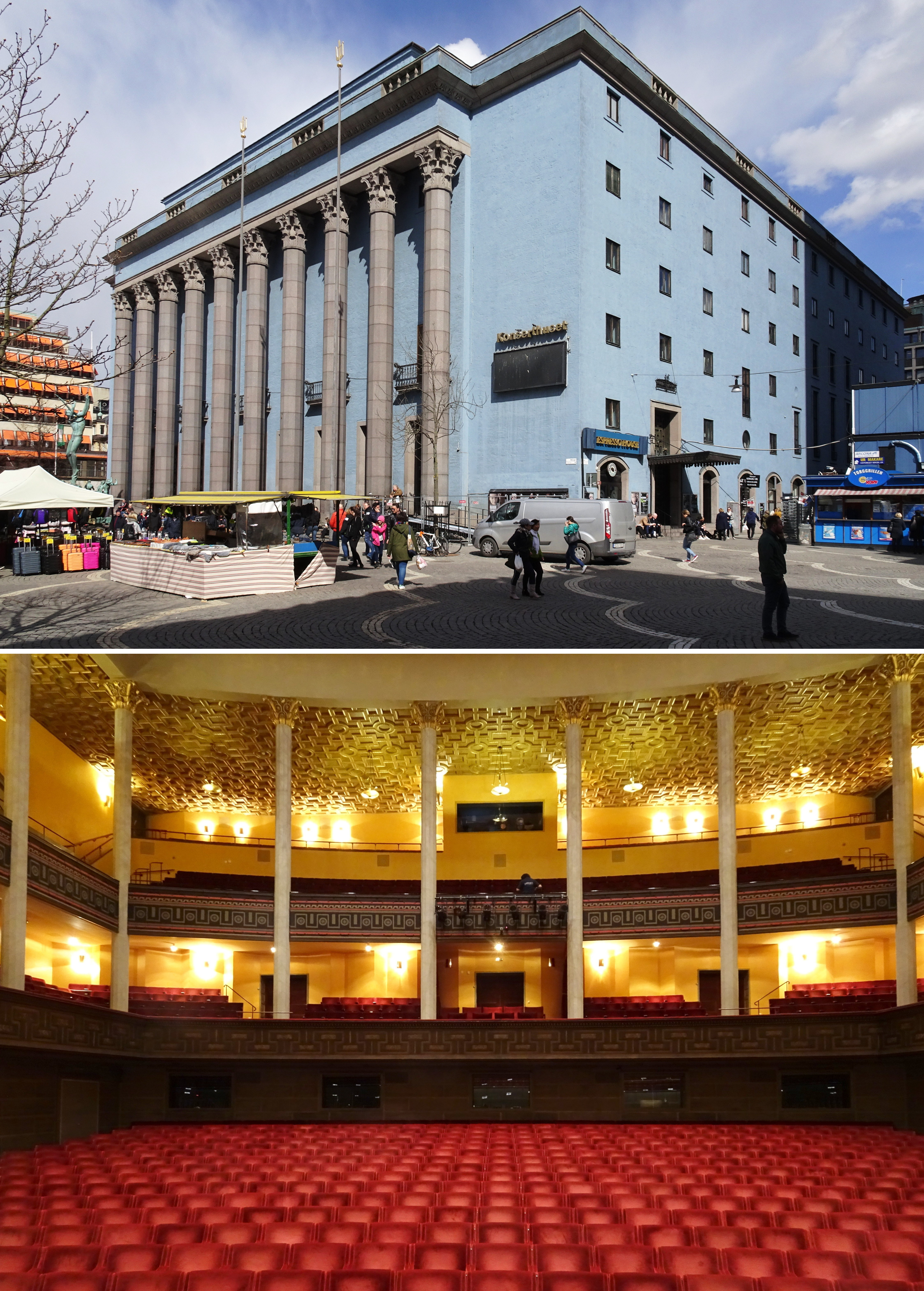

General information
- Architectural style: Nordic Classicism
- Location: Hötorget 8; 111 57 Stockholm; Sweden
- Completed: 1926
- Inaugurated: 7 April 1926

Design and construction
- Architect: Ivar Tengbom

Other information
- Seating capacity: 1,770 (Stora salen); 460 (Grünewaldsalen); 140 (Aulinsalen)

The Stockholm Concert Hall (Swedish: Stockholms konserthus) is the main hall for orchestral music in Stockholm, Sweden.

With a design by Ivar Tengbom chosen in competition, inaugurated in 1926, the Hall is home to the Royal Stockholm Philharmonic Orchestra. It is also where the awarding ceremonies for the Nobel Prize and the Polar Music Prize are held annually. The interior includes work by Ewald Dahlskog, and the walls and ceiling in the minor hall, now known as Grünewald Hall, were painted by Isaac Grünewald. The exterior is the site of sculptor Carl Milles' 1936 bronze fountain, the Orfeus-brunnen ("the Orpheus Well").

The blue building lies to the east of Hötorget.

Many pop and rock concerts by famous artists have taken place at the Stockholm Concert Hall.

Construction of the concert hall was funded in part by a testamentary donation from Rosa Nachmanson.

== Gallery ==
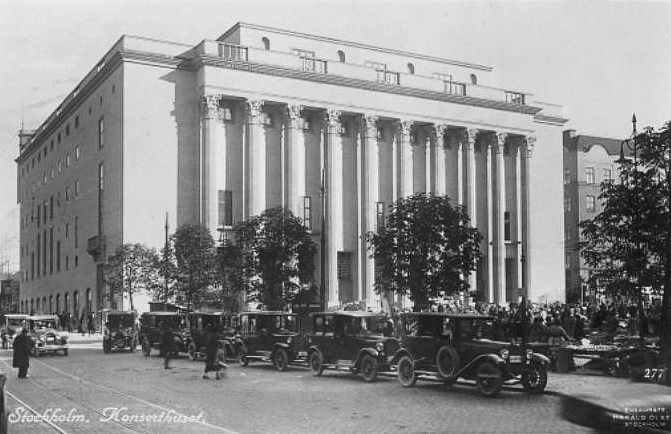
Stockholm Concert Hall in 1926

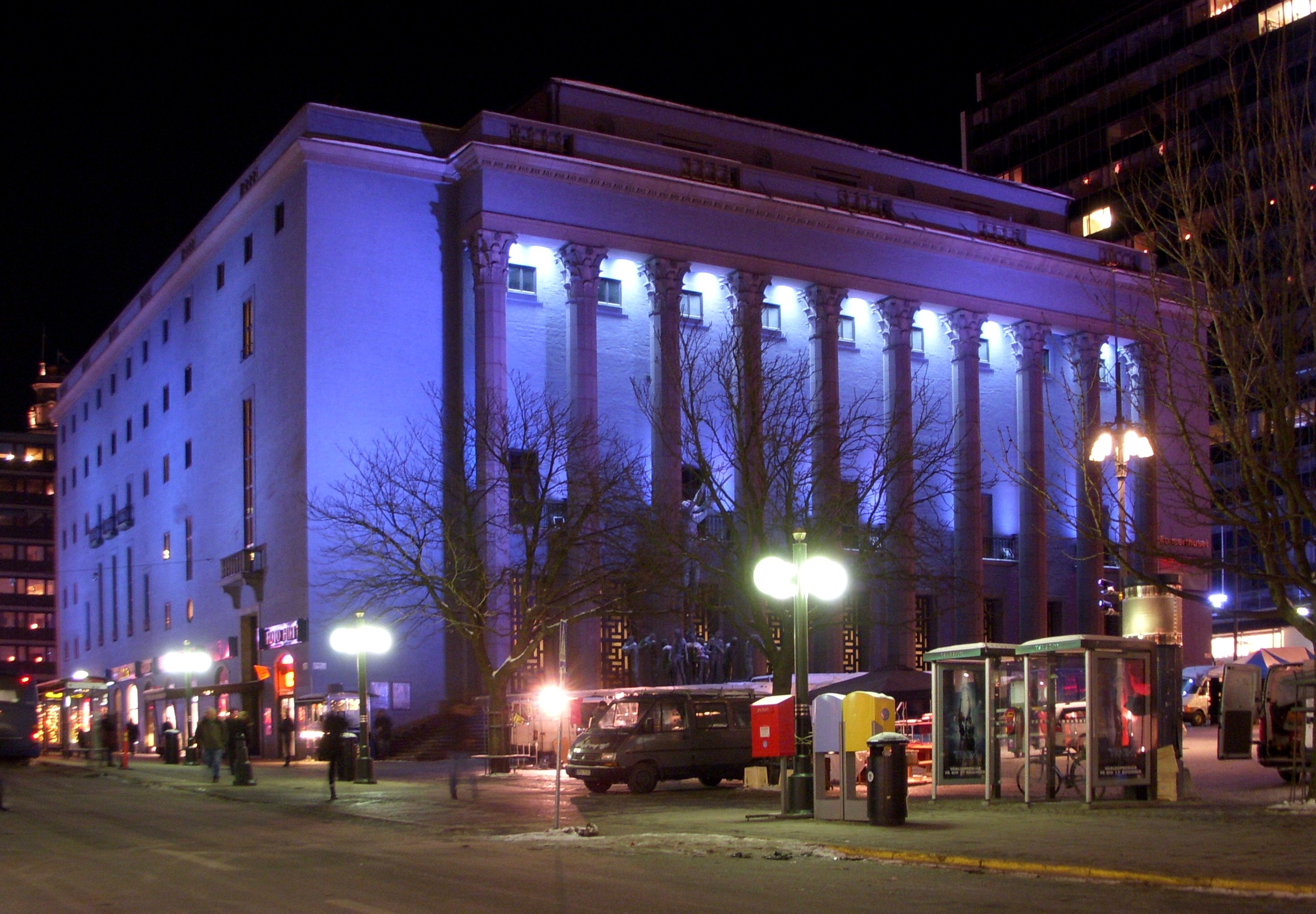
Stockholm Concert Hall in 2010

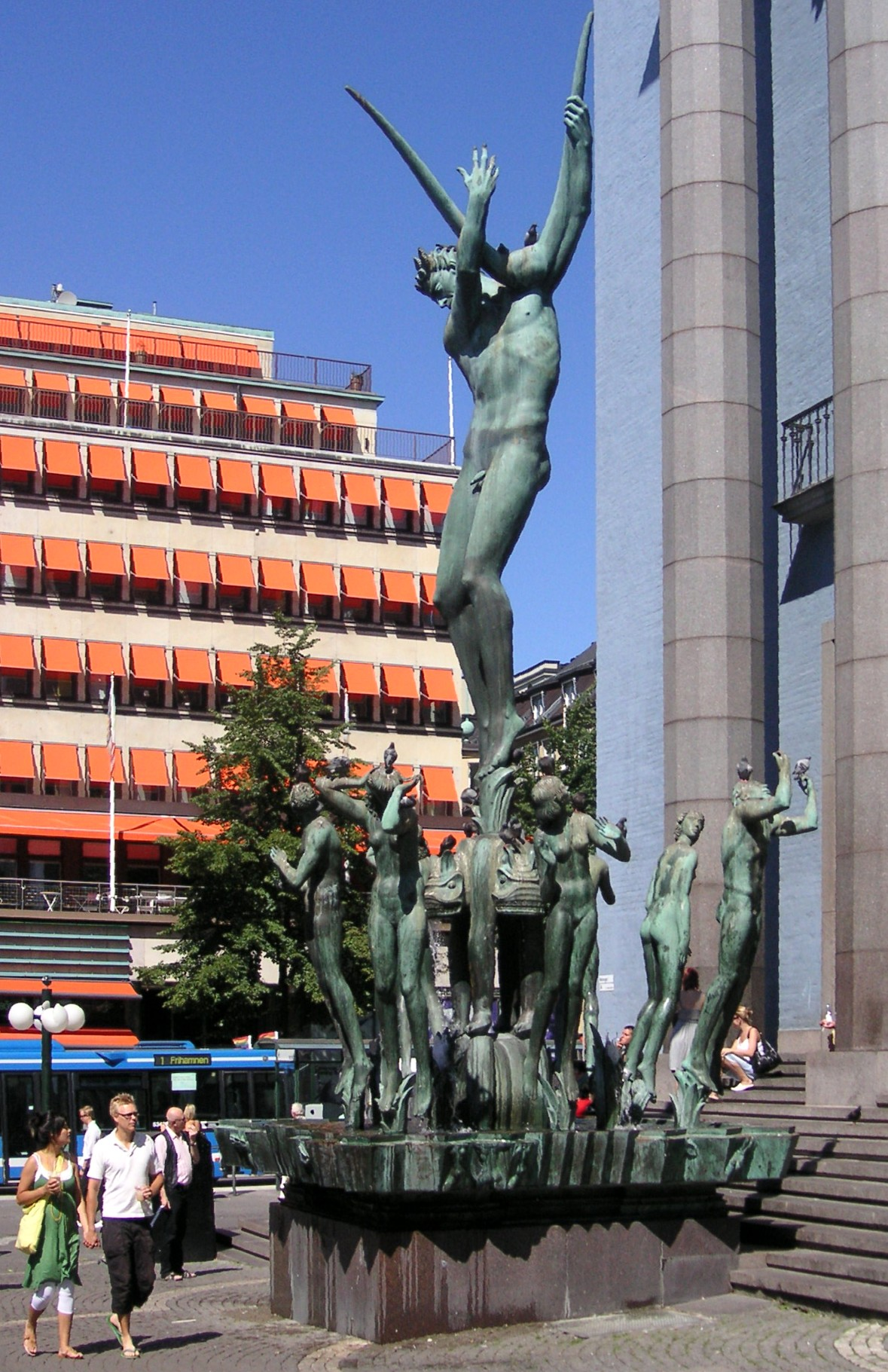
Carl Milles, Orfeus-brunnen

100th anniversary exhibition 2026
