= 1980 in jazz =

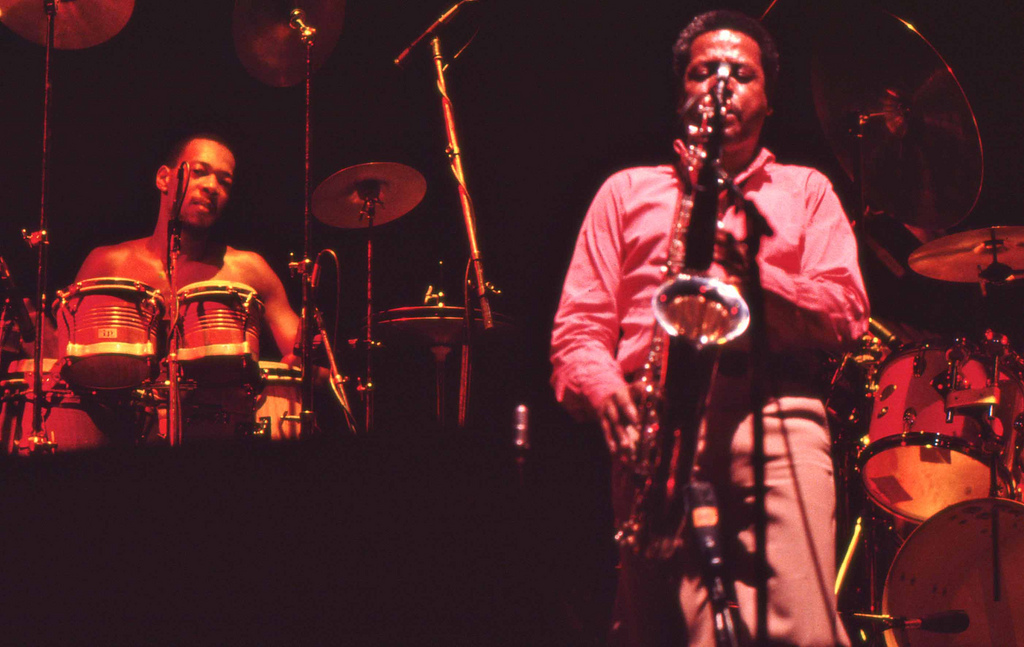
- Bobby Thomas and Wayne Shorter with Weather Report, Amsterdam, 1980
- Decade: 1980s in jazz
- Music: 1980 in music
- Standards: List of post-1950 jazz standards
- See also: 1979 in jazz – 1981 in jazz

This is a timeline documenting events of Jazz in the year 1980.

== Events ==
=== March ===
- 28 – The 7th Vossajazz started in Vossavangen, Norway (March 28 – 30).
  - Featured artists on Vossajazz was Cross Section, E`Olen, Elton Dean Quartet with Kenny Wheeler, Hariprasad Chaurasia Ensemble, Johnny Griffin Quartet, Kristian Bergheim / Andreas Skjold Sextet with Finn Otto Hansen, Kristiansen / Jørgensen Quintet, McCoy Tyner Sextett, Niels-Henning Ørsted Pedersen / Rune Gustafsson Duo, Radka Toneff Quintet, and Stubø / Bjørklund Quartet.

=== May ===
- 21 – 8th Nattjazz started in Bergen, Norway (May 21 – June 4).
- 23 – 9th Moers Festival started in Moers, Germany (May 23 – 26).

=== June ===
- 4 - The Bill Evans Trio starts a four-day stint at the Village Vanguard. It is released after his death in a 6-CD box set on Turn Out the Stars: The Final Village Vanguard Recordings in 1996.

=== July ===
- 2 – The very first Montreal International Jazz Festival started in Montreal, Quebec, Canada (July 2 – 10).
- 4 – The 14th Montreux Jazz Festival started in Montreux, Switzerland (July 4 – 20).
- 11 – The 5th North Sea Jazz Festival started in The Hague, Netherlands (July 11 – 13).

=== September ===
- 19 – The 23rd Monterey Jazz Festival started in Monterey, California (September 19 – 21).

== Album releases ==
- Chuck Mangione: Fun and Games
- George Benson: Give Me the Night
- Grover Washington Jr.: Winelight
- Larsen Feyten Band: Larsen Feyten Band
- James Ulmer: Are You Glad to Be in America?
- Ronald Shannon Jackson: Eye on You
- Michael Franks: One Bad Habit
- Anthony Davis: Lady of the Mirrors
- Rova Saxophone Quartet: Invisible Frames
- Om: Cerberus
- Pat Metheny: 80/81
- Pat Metheny: As Falls Wichita, so Falls Wichita Falls
- Billy Bang: Changing Seasons
- Julius Hemphill: Flat-Out Jump Suite
- Charles Noyes: Free Mammals
- Steve Tibbetts: YR
- World Saxophone Quartet: WSQ
- David Murray: Ming
- Ganelin Trio: Ancora da Capo
- Joanne Brackeen: Ancient Dynasty
- Ran Blake: Film Noir
- Muhal Richard Abrams: Mama and Daddy
- Derek Bailey: Aida
- Evan Parker: Six of One
- Steps Ahead: Step by Step
- Steve Beresford: Double Indemnity
- Music Revelation Ensemble: No Wave
- Jan Garbarek: Eventyr
- David Liebman: If They Only Knew
- Tom Varner: Quartet
- Harvie Swartz: Underneath It All
- Paul Winter: Callings
- World Saxophone Quartet: Revue
- Chico Freeman: Peaceful Heart, Gentle Spirit
- Jack DeJohnette: Tin Can Alley
- Jay Clayton: All Out
- Art Pepper: Winter Moon
- Herbie Hancock: Mr. Hands

== Deaths ==
January

- 6 – Poley McClintock, American singer (born 1900).
- 22 – Ed Garland, American upright bassist (born 1895).
- 23 – Babs Gonzales, American vocalist (born 1919).
- 28 – Jimmy Crawford, American drummer (born 1910).
- 29 – Jimmy Durante, American singer, pianist, comedian, and actor (born 1893).

February

- 9 – Charles Fowlkes, American baritone saxophonist, Count Basie Orchestra (born 1916).
- 12 – Norman Keenan, American upright bassist (born 1916).
- 18 – Paul Howard, American saxophonist and clarinetist (born 1895).
- 19 – Shorty Sherock, American trumpeter (born 1915).

March

- 4 – Don Albert, American trumpeter and bandleader (born 1908).
- 6 – Bobby Jones, American saxophonist (born 1928).

April

- 20 – Ronnie Boykins, American upright bassist (born 1935).
- 22 – Jane Froman, American singer and actress (born 1907).
- 28 – Chino Pozo, Cuban drummer (born 1915).

May

- 31 – Sonny Burke, American musical arranger, composer, big band leader, and producer, Duke Ambassadors (born 1914).

June

- 12 – Stu Martin, American drummer (born 1938).
- 14 – Herman Autrey, American trumpeter (born 1904).
- 27 – Barney Bigard, American clarinetist (born 1906).

July

- 2 – Amos White, American trumpeter (born 1889).
- 9 – Vinicius de Moraes, Brazilian singer, poet, lyricist, essayist, and playwright (born 1913).
- Harlan Lattimore, African-American singer (born 1908).

August

- 4
  - Duke Pearson, American pianist and composer (born 1932).
  - Pekka Pöyry, Finnish saxophonist and flutist (born 1939).
- 26 – Jimmy Forrest, American tenor saxophonist (born 1920).

September

- 5 – Don Banks, Australian composer (born 1923).
- 15 – Bill Evans, American pianist and composer (born 1929).
- 18 – Dick Stabile, American saxophonist and bandleader (born 1909).
- 22 – Jimmy Bryant, American guitarist (born 1925).

October

- 14 – Oscar Alemán, Argentine guitarist, singer, and dancer (born 1909).
- 31
  - Chauncey Morehouse, American drummer (born 1902).
  - Jan Werich, Czech singer, actor, playwright, and writer (born 1905).

November

- 22 – Uffe Baadh, Danish-American drummer (born 1923).

December

- 16 – Keith Christie, English trombonist (born 1931).
- 26 – Peck Kelley, American pianist (born 1898).
- 29 – Lennie Felix, British pianist (born 1920).
- 31 – Irmgard Österwall, Swedish singer (born 1914).

Unknown date

- Aldo Rossi, Italian reedist and bandleader (born 1911).
- Cosimo Di Ceglie, Italian guitarist (born 1913).

== Births ==
January

- 3 – David Arthur Skinner, British pianist and composer.
- 12 – Dominic Lash, British upright bassist and composer.
- 15 – Christoffer Andersen, Norwegian guitarist.
- 22 – Lizz Wright, American singer.

February

- 9 – Jackiem Joyner, American saxophonist.
- 21 – Takuya Kuroda, Japanese trumpeter.
- 27 – Federico Casagrande, Italian guitarist and composer.

March

- 10 – Lars Horntveth, Norwegian saxophonist, clarinetist, percussionist, guitarist, composer, and band leader, Jaga Jazzist.
- 22 – Jay Foote, American bassist and singer.
- 31 – Sasha Dobson, American singer-songwriter.

April

- 10 – Jimmy Rosenberg, Dutch guitarist.
- 24
  - Jelle van Tongeren, Dutch violinist.
  - Vincent Peirani, French accordionist, vocalist, and composer.

May

- 5 – Stian Omenås, Norwegian Jazz musician (trumpet), music conductor and composer
- 28 – Benedikt Jahnel, German jazz pianist, composer, and bandleader.

June

- 18 – Jasser Haj Youssef, Tunisian violinist.

July

- 8
  - Kendrick Scott, American drummer, bandleader, and composer.
  - Tyshawn Sorey, American multi-instrumentalist, and composer.
- 10 – Julie Crochetière, Canadian singer-songwriter and pianist.

August

- 16 – Øystein Moen, Norwegian pianist, keyboarder, and composer, Jaga Jazzist.
- 25 – Pål Hausken, Norwegian drummer, percussion, and composer, In The Country.

September

- 2 – Mark Guiliana, American drummer, composer and bandleader.
- 18 – Gustav Lundgren, Swedish guitarist, composer, and record label director.
- 25 – Christina Bjordal, Norwegian singer.

October

- 16 – Mary Halvorson, American guitarist.
- 17
  - Alberto Porro Carmona, Spanish conductor, composer, author, music lecturer, teacher, and saxophonist.
  - Manuel Valera, Cuban pianist and composer.
- 19
  - Morten Schantz, Danish pianist, composer, and band leader, JazzKamikaze.
  - Simin Tander, German singer, pianist, and composer.

November

- 4 – Ruslan Sirota, Ukrainian pianist, composer, and producer.
- 6 – Lena Nymark, Norwegian jazz singer.
- 17 – Colin Vallon, Swiss pianist.

December

- 5 – Ibrahim Maalouf, French-Lebanese trumpeter and composer.
- 9 – Anton Eger, Norwegian-Swedish Jazz drummer, JazzKamikaze.
- 28 – Andreas Amundsen, Norwegian bassist.

Unknown date

- Brandi Disterheft, Canadian upright bassist and composer.
- Elana Stone, Australian vocalist, songwriter, pianist, accordion player, and band leader.
- Hannah Marshall, British cellist, vocalist, and composer.
- Martin Blanes, Galician-Spanish guitarist.
- Tim Giles, English drummer and composer.
- Yasek Manzano Silva, Cuban trumpeter and composer

== See also ==
- 1980s in jazz
- List of years in jazz
- 1980 in music
