= Ronny Drayton =

American guitarist (1953–2020)

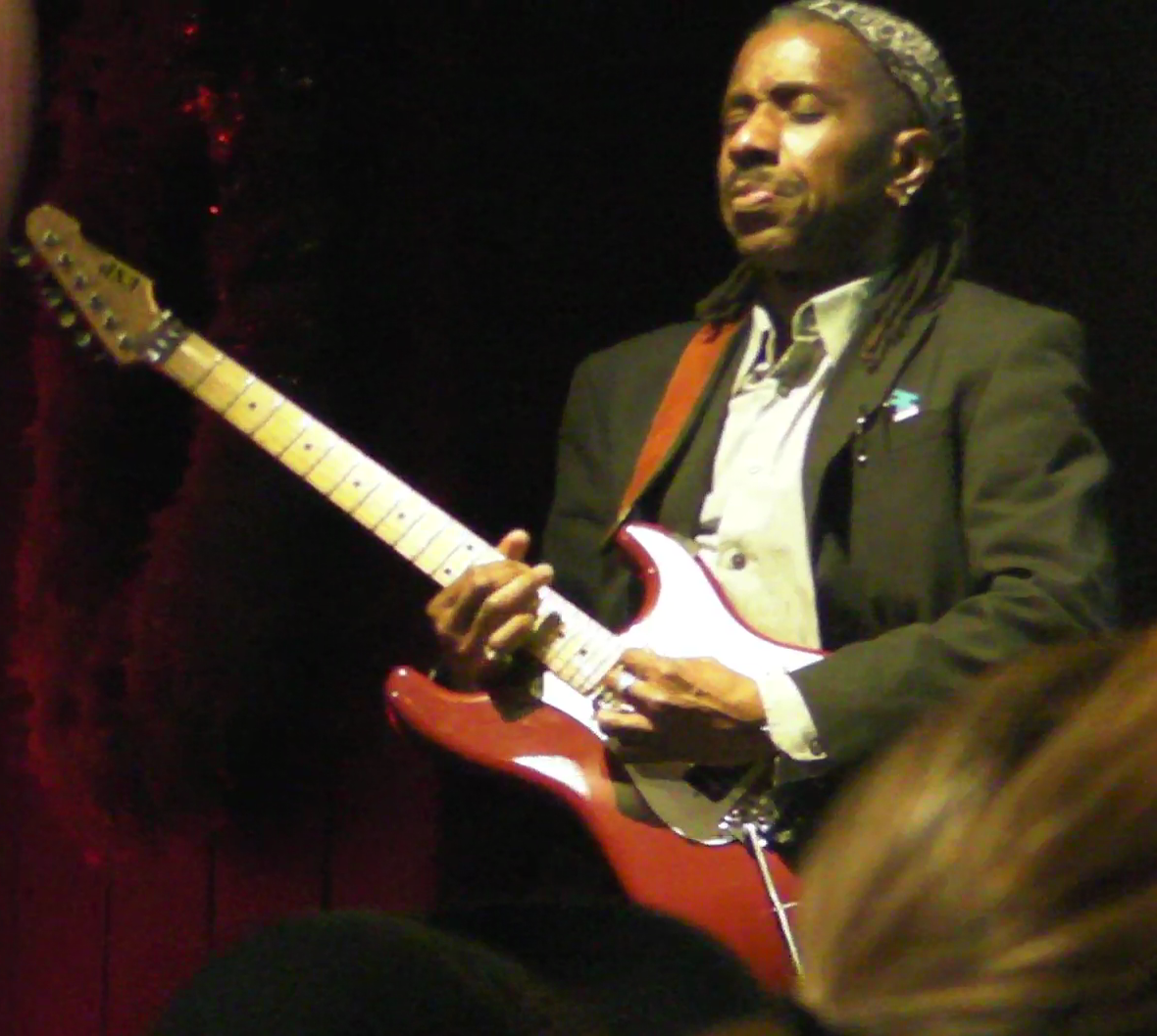
- Ronny "Head" Drayton on guitar
- Born: Ronald Drayton; May 19, 1953; South Jamaica, Queens, New York, U.S.
- Died: February 7, 2020 (aged 66); New York City, U.S.
- Education: John Bowne High School; Kingsborough Community College
- Occupations: musician; guitarist
- Years active: 1972–2020

Ronny Drayton (May 19, 1953 – February 7, 2020) was a guitarist based in the New York City area and Monroe, New York.

Born and raised in South Jamaica, Queens, New York City, Drayton started out playing drums at St. Clement The Pope Middle School and switched to guitar at age 14. After high school, he eventually met and played with many musicians in diverse genres, including rock, funk, soul, blues and jazz, and R&B.

Drayton is left-hand, but plays a right-handed guitar upside-down, without restringing.

His first musical instrument was the drums.

He became an in-demand session musician, performing with Edwin Birdsong, Nona Hendryx, The Persuaders, and The Chambers Brothers. He also studied Composition and Arrangement at Kingsborough Community College. Over the years, he has worked on numerous recording projects as well as various TV shows and videos. In late 2012, Drayton joined 24-7 Spyz, performing with them as well as the bands Defunkt and Burnt Sugar the Arkestra Chamber until his death.

In 2012, Drayton was active in trying to get his son, Donovan Drayton, released from Riker's Island. In 2013, he contributed music to a benefit album to help recoup the legal fees involved in this fight.

On February 7, 2020, Drayton died of Non Hodgkins Lymphoma and treatment complications at the age of 66.

== Partial discography ==
- 1973 - Edwin Birdsong - Super Natural
- 1976 - Roy Ayers Ubiquity - Everybody Loves the Sunshine
- 1982 - Material - One Down
- 1984 - David Sylvian - Brilliant Trees
- 1987 - Nona Hendryx - Female Trouble
- 1988 - Defunkt - In America
- 1988 - Missing Links – Groovin'
- 1999 - Meshell Ndegeocello - Bitter
- 2013 - Various Artists - 4Donovan
- 2018 - 24-7 Spyz - The Soundtrack To The Innermost Galaxy

With James Blood Ulmer

- 1981 - Free Lancing
- 1981 - Black Rock
- 1989 - Blues Allnight
- 1990 - Black and Blues
- 1992 - Blues Preacher
