= Got Something Good for You =

Studio album by James Blood Ulmer and George Adams: Phalanx
- Released: 1986
- Recorded: September 1985
- Studio: Volkspark-Studio Hamburg, West Germany
- Genre: Jazz
- Length: 39:16
- Label: Moers Music momu 02046
- Producer: Burkhard Hennen

Phalanx chronology
Got Something Good for You (1986)	Original Phalanx (1987)

James Blood Ulmer chronology
Live at the Caravan of Dreams (1986)	Got Something Good for You (1986)	America – Do You Remember the Love? (1987)

George Adams chronology
Live at Montmartre (1985)	Got Something Good for You (1986)	Breakthrough (1986)

Got Something Good for You is an album by James Blood Ulmer and George Adams' band Phalanx which was recorded in 1985 and released on the German Moers Music label.

Professional ratings
Review scores
Source	Rating
Allmusic	3/5 stars

== Track listing ==
All compositions by James Blood Ulmer except where noted

1. "Upside Down" – 3:27
2. "Funky Lover" – 6:51
3. "Past Time" – 5:18
4. "A Night Out" (George Adams) – 5:29
5. "Rough Traders" (Adams, Ulmer) – 7:00
6. "Love and Two Faces" – 6:12
7. "House People" – 4:59

== Personnel ==
- James Blood Ulmer - guitar, vocals
- George Adams - tenor saxophone, vocals
- Amin Ali - electric bass
- Calvin Weston - drums
