= Grant Calvin Weston =

- Born: June 6, 1959; Philadelphia, Pennsylvania, U.S.
- Genres: Jazz, funk, rock
- Occupation: Musician
- Instrument: Drums
- Formerly of: The Lounge Lizards, Phalanx

Grant Calvin Weston (also known as G. Calvin Weston and Calvin Weston) (born June 6, 1959) is a drummer best known for his association with Ornette Coleman's band Prime Time.

== Career ==
Weston was born and raised in Philadelphia, Pennsylvania, and began playing music as a youth. At age 17, he joined Ornette Coleman's band Prime Time, and recorded three albums with them. He then went on to perform and record with guitarist James Blood Ulmer as well as with John Lurie and The Lounge Lizards. He has also released two dozen albums as leader or co-leader, and is currently a member of the Free Form Funky Freqs, a trio with guitarist Vernon Reid and bassist Jamaaladeen Tacuma, and Wail, a band with members of Stinking Lizaveta.

== Discography ==
=== As leader or co-leader ===
- Dance Romance (In+Out, 1988) with James Blood Ulmer and Jamaaladeen Tacuma
- Percussion Duets (Amulet, 1995) with Billy Martin
- Mirakle (Tzadik, 2000) with Derek Bailey and Jamaaladeen Tacuma
- When We Were Young (It's A Pleasure, 2001)
- For No One in Particular (Amulet, 2003) with Billy Martin and DJ Logic
- Live At Houston Hall November 17, 2002 (Amulet, 2005) with Billy Martin
- Nassira (Amulet, 2008)
- My Gypsy Lover (Nassira, 2008)
- Of Alien Feelings (Imaginary Chicago, 2012)
- Play Out Loud (self-released, 2012)
- Blues and Daily News (Prescott, 2014) with Ross Hammond
- Magic Hands (self-released, 2014) with Henryk Gembalski and Krzysztof Majchrzak
- Metamorphosis (self-released, 2015) with Waldemar Knade
- Flying Kites (Bandcamp, 2015) with Lucas Brode
- No Zone (Naismith & Weston, 2016)
- Terra Lingua Sketches (Bandcamp, 2016) with Mika Pontecorvo, Cartoon Justice
- Spiritual Branches, Sleepless Burial (Bandcamp, 2016)
- Improv Messenger (577, 2016)
- Face Off (Zott, 2016) with Kazutoki Umezu
- Dust and Ash (577, 2019) with the Phoenix Orchestra
- Root (Bandcamp, 2020) with Ross Hammond
- Hydrogen 77 (Self-released, 2021) with Richard Hill and Colton Weatherston
- Bless (Prescott, 2021) with Ross Hammond
- Stone Church (Bandcamp, 2022) with Jim Kost
- Imagination/Meditation (Cacophonous Revival, 2023) with Lucas Brode

With Dying Ground (trio with Kato Hideki and Eyvind Kang

- Dying Ground (Avant, 1998)

With Free Form Funky Frēqs (trio with Vernon Reid and Jamaaladeen Tacuma)

- Urban Mythology Volume One (Thirsty Ear, 2007)
- Bon Vivant (Jam All Productions, 2013)
- Hymn of the 3rd Galaxy (Ropeadope, 2022)

With Warm Trio (trio with Boguslaw Raatz and Grzegorz Korybalski

- Warm Trio (RG, 2015)
- Mouse Paradise (RG, 2020)

=== As sideman ===
With Ornette Coleman

- Of Human Feelings (Antilles, 1982)
- In All Languages (Caravan of Dreams, 1987)
- Virgin Beauty (Portrait, 1988)

With The Lounge Lizards

- Live in Berlin 1991 Vol. 1 (veraBra, 1991)
- Queen of All Ears (Strange and Beautiful, 1998)

With John Lurie

- Men with Sticks (Crammed Discs/Made to Measure, 1993)
- Big Trouble / She's Not A Nurse (For Us, 1997)
- Excess Baggage (soundtrack) (Prophecy, 1997)
- Fishing With John (soundtrack) (Strange and Beautiful, 1998)
- The Legendary Marvin Pontiac: Greatest Hits (Strange and Beautiful, 1999)
- African Swim and Manny & Lo (soundtrack) (Strange and Beautiful, 1999)
- The Invention of Animals (Amulet, 2014)

With Phalanx

- Got Something Good for You (Moers Music, 1986)
- Phalanx Live (American Revelation, 2013)

With Marc Ribot

- Asmodeus: Book of Angels Volume 7 (Tzadik, 2007)
- The Young Philadelphians: Live in Tokyo (Harmolodic, 2015)

With James Blood Ulmer

- Are You Glad to Be in America? (Rough Trade, 1980)
- Free Lancing (Columbia, 1981)
- Black Rock (Columbia, 1982)
- Blues Allnight (In+Out, 1989)
- Black and Blues (DIW, 1991)
- Forbidden Blues (DIW, 1998)
- Black Rock Reunion (American Revelation, 2009)
- Freelancing Live (American Revelation, 2013)

With others

- Various artists, Lounge-A-Palooza, (Hollywood, 1997)
- Tricky, Angels With Dirty Faces (Island, 1998)
- Eszter Balint, Flicker (Scratchie, 1999)
- James Carter, Layin' in the Cut (Atlantic, 2000)
- Michael Blake, Hellbent (Bandcamp, 2010)
- Axiomatic, The Birds of My Senses : Live at the Stone (Musso, 2013)
- John Zorn, Bagatelles (Vol. 5-8) (Tzadik, 2021)
- Amanda Chaudhary, Meow Meow Band (Catsynth, 2021), Merp Friend (CatSynth, 2022)
