= Hank Marr =

American jazz organist (1927–2004)

- Born: 30 January 1927
- Origin: Columbus, Ohio, United States
- Died: 16 March 2004 (aged 77)
- Genres: Jazz
- Occupation: Musician
- Instrument: Hammond B-3 organ
- Labels: Federal, Wingate, King

Hank Marr (30 January 1927 – 16 March 2004) was an American jazz musician known for his work on the Hammond B-3 organ.

== Career ==
Natives of Columbus, Ohio, Hank Marr and tenor saxophonist Rusty Bryant co-led a group that toured for several years, beginning in 1958. Marr later led a group that featured James Blood Ulmer. Ulmer first recorded professionally with Marr in 1967–1968; they had previously toured in 1966–1967. Guitarists Freddie King (1961–1962) and Wilbert Longmire (1963–1964) also did recordings with Marr. In the late 1960s, Marr performed in a duo with guitarist Floyd Smith in Atlantic City, New Jersey.

Marr had two minor hit singles, "The Greasy Spoon" (U.S. No. 101, 1964) and "Silver Spoon" (U.S. No. 134, 1965).

== Discography ==
=== Albums ===
- Teentime...Latest Dance Steps (King, 1963) -with Rusty Bryant, Cal Collins
- Live at the Club 502 (King, 1964) -with Rusty Bryant, Wilbert Longmire
- On and Off Stage (King, 1965) -with Rusty Bryant
- Sounds from the Marr-Ket Place (King, 1968) -with George Adams, James Blood Ulmer
- It's 'Bout Time! (Double Time, 1995)
- Groovin' It (Double Time, 1996)
- Hank & Frank (Double Time, 1997) -with Frank Foster
- Blues'n and Cruisin' (Double Time, 2001 [2005])

=== Compilations ===
- Hank Marr Plays 24 Great Songs (King, 1966) 24 tracks/2LP compilation
- Greasy Spoon (King, 1969) 12 tracks/LP compilation
- Greasy Spoon (Charly R&B, 1991) 20 tracks/CD compilation

=== Singles ===
Federal Records

- 1961 Tonk Game/Hob-Nobbin'
- 1961 Ram-Bunk-Shush/The Push
- 1961 Travelin' Heavy/Mexican Vodka
- 1962 The Twist Serenade/Your Magic Touch
- 1962 The Watusi-Roll/Sweet Nancy
- 1963 Marsanova/Stand in Line
- 1963 The Squash/Day By Day
- 1963 The Push [reissue]/Tonk Game [reissue]
- 1963 The Greasy Spoon/I Can't Go On (Without You)
- 1964 I Remember New York/Easy Talk
- 1964 Bridge to Shangri-La/Up and Down
- 1965 Hank's Idea/Midnight Moon
- 1965 Silver Spoon/No Rough Stuff

Wingate Records

- 1966 Sonny Stitt: Stitt's Groove/Hank Marr: Marr's Groove
- 1966 White House Party/The 'Out' Crowd

Federal Records

- 1967 Philly Dog '67/I Remember New York [reissue]

King Records

- 1968 Down in the Bottom/Soup Spoon
- 1969 The Market Place/Smothered Soul
- 1969 The Greasy Spoon [reissue]/All My Love Belongs to You
