= Aldo Rossi (musician) =

Aldo Rossi (1911-1979) was an Italian jazz reedist and bandleader born in Milan.

Rossi performed and recorded with Kramer Gorni's orchestra in the middle of the 1930s, and also played in small ensembles led by Enzo Ceragioli and Cosimo Di Ceglie. In the mid-1940s he founded a large ensemble called the Orchestra del Momento, in which he and Gorni shared bandleadership. Giorgio Gaslini, Eraldo Volonte, and Roberto Nicolosi all played in Rossi's orchestra, which recorded for Fonit Records on multiple occasions.
