= In Touch =

In Touch or InTouch may refer to:

- In Touch (journal), a digital quarterly periodical produced by the Australian Institute of Interpreters and Translators (AUSIT)
- Intouch Holdings, a Thai holding company
- In Touch (radio series), a programme on BBC Radio 4
- In Touch Ministries, a Christian Evangelical organization
- In Touch Weekly, a celebrity and lifestyle magazine
- Intouch triangle, interior triangle defined by the 3 points on a circle
- In Touch (album), a 1988 album by Phalanx
- In Touch, album by Tommy James
