= Reunion (Odyssey the Band album) =

1998 studio album by Odyssey the Band

Studio album by Odyssey the Band: Charlie Burnham, James Blood Ulmer, Warren Benbrow
- Released: March 21, 1998
- Recorded: 1997
- Studios: Knitting Factory, NYC
- Genre: Jazz
- Length: 54:32
- Labels: Knitting Factory; KFR 220
- Producer: James Blood Ulmer

James Blood Ulmer chronology
Cross Fire (1997)	Reunion (1998)	Blue Blood (2001)

Reunion is an album by Odyssey the Band, featuring guitarist James Blood Ulmer, violinist Charlie Burnham and drummer Warren Benbrow, recorded in 1997 and released on the Knitting Factory label. This album reunites the musicians who originally recorded Odyssey in 1983 for the Columbia label.

== Reception ==
Professional ratings
Review scores
Source	Rating
AllMusic	4/5 stars
Robert Christgau	A−

The AllMusic review by Tom Schulte stated, "The themes build slowly, transform and return in a delivery that is emotional and intimate. It may take several listens to get used to Ulmer's nasal, narrow range, but the album is solid and worth repeated listens, and the tracks are well-arranged". Robert Christgau said it was "a record that starts atmospheric, turns songful, and ropes you in with a sound either way."

== Track listing ==
All compositions by James Blood Ulmer

1. "No Other Option" – 5:16
2. "Channel 1" – 6:09
3. "Running Man" – 2:58
4. "I Believe in You" – 6:24
5. "Online Junkie" – 5:41
6. "I Am" – 6:21
7. "Love Dance" – 6:45
8. "Where Did All the Girls Come From" – 8:00
9. "Alham du Allah" – 6:58

== Personnel ==
- James "Blood" Ulmer – guitar, vocals
- Charlie Burnham – violin
- Warren Benbrow – drums
