= Elec. Jazz =

Studio album by Music Revelation Ensemble
- Released: 1990
- Recorded: March 12 & 13, 1990
- Studio: A&R Recording, New York City
- Genre: Jazz
- Length: 50:16
- Label: DIW; DIW 839
- Producer: James Blood Ulmer & Kazunori Sugiyama

Music Revelation Ensemble chronology
Music Revelation Ensemble (1988)	Elec. Jazz (1990)	After Dark (1992)

James Blood Ulmer chronology
Blues Allnight (1989)	Elec. Jazz (1990)	Black and Blues (1991)

Elec. Jazz is an album by James Blood Ulmer's Music Revelation Ensemble recorded in 1990 and released on the Japanese DIW label featuring performances by Ulmer with David Murray, Amin Ali and Cornell Rochester.

== Reception ==
The Allmusic review by Brian Olewnick states, "Essentially James "Blood" Ulmer's band, the Music Revelation Ensemble both harks back to his early recorded history with saxophonist David Murray and seeks to update the guitarist's unique fusion of funk, out jazz, and hardcore blues... Ulmer, of course, is sui generis, and his playing here, in all its raggedness, grit, and clarity, is arguably some of the best he ever put to disc. Forget the insipid album title. Elec. Jazz contains some fine, tough music and is well-worth seeking out".

Professional ratings
Review scores
Source	Rating
Allmusic	4/5 stars

== Track listing ==
All compositions by James Blood Ulmer

1. "Exit" - 5:27
2. "Inter City" - 6:40
3. "Big Top" - 5:45
4. "No More" - 8:22
5. "Big Top Part 2" - 6:46
6. "Taps Dance" - 10:32
7. "Exit Part 2" - 6:44

== Personnel ==
- James Blood Ulmer - guitar
- David Murray - tenor saxophone
- Amin Ali - electric bass
- Cornell Rochester - drums
