= Free Lancing =

Studio album by James Blood Ulmer
- Released: 1981
- Recorded: 1981
- Genre: Jazz
- Length: 47:31
- Label: Columbia
- Producers: Jim Fishel, Roger Trilling, James "Blood" Ulmer

James Blood Ulmer chronology
| No Wave (1980) | Free Lancing (1981) | Black Rock (1982) |

Free Lancing is an album by American guitarist James Blood Ulmer, recorded in 1981 and released on the Columbia label. It was Ulmer's first of three albums recorded for a major label.

== Reception ==
The AllMusic review by Brian Olewnick stated that "it's Ulmer's stinging guitar lines — rough-hewn, corrosive, and scrabbling — throughout this recording that make it one of his finest".

Professional ratings
Review scores
| Source | Rating |
|---|---|
| AllMusic | 4/5 stars |
| The Rolling Stone Jazz Record Guide | 4/5 stars |

Trouser Press described both Free Lancing and the subsequent Black Rock as "technical masterpieces, making up in precision what they lack in emotion (as compared to Are You Glad to Be in America?). Working to expand his audience, Ulmer concentrates more on electric guitar flash, and actual melodies can be discerned from the improvised song structures (improvisation being one of the keys to harmolodics)."

In naming it the 220th best 'heavy metal' album up to 1991, Chuck Eddy cites Free Lancing as "the most natural place for metal-flash/guitar-hero aficionados to board Blood's bloodcurdling barge without rocking it too much, which explains why it was granted so much muso-mag ink."

== Track listing ==
All compositions by James Blood Ulmer

1. "Timeless" – 4:22
2. "Pleasure Control" – 5:00
3. "Night Lover" – 5:22
4. "Where Did All the Girls Come From?" – 4:38
5. "High Time" – 4:00
6. "Hijack" –
7. "Free Lancing" – 4:42
8. "Stand Up to Yourself" – 4:37
9. "Rush Hour" – 5:32
10. "Happy Time" – 5:11

== Personnel ==
- James Blood Ulmer – electric guitar; vocals (tracks 2, 4 & 8)
- Amin Ali – electric bass
- G. Calvin Weston – drums
- Ronnie Drayton – second guitar (2, 4 & 8)
- Diane Wilson, Irene Datcher, Zenobia Konkerite – background vocals (2, 4 & 8)
- David Murray – tenor saxophone (5, 6 & 9)
- Oliver Lake – alto saxophone (5, 6 & 9)
- Olu Dara – trumpet (5, 6 & 9)
