= Bad Blood in the City: The Piety Street Sessions =

Studio album by James Blood Ulmer
- Released: May 8, 2007
- Recorded: 2006
- Genre: Blues
- Length: 48:48
- Label: Hyena
- Producer: Vernon Reid

James Blood Ulmer chronology
Back in Time (2005)	Bad Blood in the City: The Piety Street Sessions (2007)	In and Out (2009)

Bad Blood in the City: The Piety Street Sessions is an album by American guitarist James Blood Ulmer, recorded in New Orleans at the Piety Street Recording Studios and released on the Hyena label in 2007.

== Reception ==
The AllMusic review by Thom Jurek states, "The creative place Blood finds himself in his partnership with Reid is yielding great fruit. This album is the strongest of their collaborations thus far, and is a wild ride through blues, R&B, and hard-driving distorted and feedback-laced — yet utterly musical — New Orleans funk. It's a monster".

Professional ratings
Review scores
Source	Rating
AllMusic	4/5 stars
The Penguin Guide to Jazz Recordings	3/4 stars

== Track listing ==
All compositions by James Blood Ulmer except as indicated

1. "Survivors of the Hurricane" – 3:53
2. "Sad Days, Lonely Nights" (Junior Kimbrough) – 5:59
3. "Katrina" – 3:46
4. "Let's Talk About Jesus" – 4:19
5. "This Land Is Nobody's Land" (John Lee Hooker) – 5:18
6. "Dead presidents" (Willie Dixon, William R. Emerson) – 4:40
7. "Commit a Crime" (Chester Burnett) – 5:21
8. "Grinnin' in Your Face" (Eddie J. House Jr.) – 4:36
9. "There Is Power in the Blues" – 2:28
10. "Backwater Blues" (Traditional) – 5:52
11. "Old Slave Master" – 2:36
  - Recorded at Piety Street Studios, New Orleans, in 2006

== Personnel ==
- James Blood Ulmer – guitar, vocals
- Vernon Reid – electric guitar, acoustic guitar
- Charles Burnham – violin, mandolin
- Leon Gruenbaum – Fender Rhodes, piano, Hammond B3 organ, keyboards, mellotron, clarinet
- David Barnes – harmonica
- Mark Peterson – electric bass, double bass
- Aubrey Dayle – drums, percussion
- Irene Datcher – vocals (track 4)
