= Sounds from the Marr-Ket Place =

Studio album by Hank Marr
- Released: 1968
- Recorded: 1968
- Genre: Jazz
- Length: 32:28
- Label: King; K5-12-1025

Hank Marr chronology
On and Off Stage (1965)	Sounds from the Marr-Ket Place (1968)	Greasy Spoon (1969)

Sounds from the Marr-Ket Place is an album by organist Hank Marr which was released by the King label in 1968.

== Reception ==
Professional ratings
Review scores
Source	Rating
AllMusic	4/5 stars

The AllMusic review by Wilson McCloy stated the album "is a solid soul-jazz outing with tight, funky arrangements and several blues. James Blood Ulmer makes his recording debut here".

== Track listing ==
1. "The Marr-Ket Place" – 2:29
2. "Soup Spoon" – 2:50
3. "Smothered Soul" – 5:00
4. "I Remember Acapulco" – 3:00
5. "Greens A-Go-Go" – 2:48
6. "Down in the Bottom" (Marr, Gene Redd) – 2:57
7. "My Dream Just Passed" – 3:07
8. "Home Fries" – 2:47
9. "Come and Get It" – 4:10
10. "Get On Down" – 3:20

== Personnel ==
- Hank Marr – Hammond organ
- George Adams – tenor saxophone
- James Blood Ulmer – guitar
- Other unidentified musicians
