= Ceragioli =

Ceragioli may refer to:

== People ==
- Enzo Ceragioli, 20th-century Italian conductor, composer, arranger, and pianist
- Giorgio Ceragioli 20th-century Italian engineer, professor and activist
- Giorgio Ceragioli, early 20th-century Italian painter and sculptor
- Peter A. Ceragioli Jr. (1932–2004), American West Coast jazz pianist and accordionist

== Places ==
- 133528 Ceragioli, asteroid of the Koronis family
