= Black Rock (James Blood Ulmer album) =

Studio album by James Blood Ulmer
- Released: 1982
- Recorded: 1982
- Genre: Jazz
- Label: Columbia
- Producer: James Blood Ulmer

James Blood Ulmer chronology
Free Lancing (1981)	Black Rock (1982)	Odyssey (1983)

Black Rock is an album by American guitarist James Blood Ulmer, recorded in 1982 and released on the Columbia label. It was Ulmer's second of three albums recorded for a major label.

== Reception ==
Robert Palmer of The New York Times praised the album upon its release, writing that "James (Blood) Ulmer's Black Rock actually lives up to its title...On the first side in particular, Mr. Ulmer, his wonderfully deft and mobile rhythm section, and his wife, the vocalist Irene Datcher, conspire to rethink guitar-band rock as radically as his earlier records rethought jazz-rock and funk. In a sense, he is attempting to transform rock much as Ornette Coleman transformed jazz in the 1960's - by opening it up rhythmically and re-emphasizing its roots in country blues and old time gospel music. The most ravishing tune on the album is 'Family Affair,' sung by Mr. Ulmer and Miss Datcher in a loose semi-unison that recalls the early country-gospel recordings of Blind Willie Johnson and features an exquisitely liquid, melodic guitar break that skirts much closer to conventional rock territory than anything Mr. Ulmer has recorded before...On the second side, he unleashes some of the most spectacular guitar pyrotechniques anyone has put on record in a long, long time."

In The Boston Phoenix, Milo Miles wrote: "On his new Black Rock, Ulmer has baited songs with unmistakable funk-rock hooks without giving in to verse/chorus/verse structure, and he’s made his peace with pop. He’s cleared away several layers of intrusive clutter; saxophone parts are pared down (reedman Sam Sanders appears on only two cuts), and Weston and Ali provide lively but linear support. ... It’s the durable, brainy, slightly crazed triumph Ulmer has promised for years."

The AllMusic review by Thom Jurek stated: "Black Rock is among Blood's strongest records. As tough as Are You Glad to Be in America? and the Music Revelation Ensemble's No Wave, yet more accessible than either. This is a fitting introduction to Blood Ulmer's unique, knotty, and truly original guitar and composition style. Black Rock is all funk, rock, jazz, and punk, indivisible and under a one world groove".

Professional ratings
Review scores
Source	Rating
AllMusic	4.5/5 stars
The Rolling Stone Jazz Record Guide	3/5 stars

Trouser Press described both Black Rock and the previous Free Lancing as "technical masterpieces, making up in precision what they lack in emotion (as compared to Are You Glad to Be in America?). Working to expand his audience, Ulmer concentrates more on electric guitar flash, and actual melodies can be discerned from the improvised song structures (improvisation being one of the keys to harmolodics)."

== Track listing ==
All compositions by James Blood Ulmer except as indicated

1. "Open House" – 5:21
2. "Black Rock" – 3:23
3. "Moonbeam" – 5:11
4. "Family Affair" (Ulmer, Irene Datcher) – 7:26
5. "More Blood" – 4:43
6. "Love Have Two Faces" – 5:29
7. "Overnight" – 3:26
8. "Fun House" (Ulmer, Grant Calvin Weston) – 4:53
9. "We Bop" – 2:58

== Personnel ==
- James Blood Ulmer – electric guitar; vocals (tracks 2, 4, 6)
- Ronald Drayton – rhythm guitar (except 5, 8)
- Amin Ali – electric bass, backing vocals (2), lead vocals (8)
- Grant Calvin Weston – drums; backing vocals (2, 7)
- Cornell Rochester – second drums (1, 3, 5 & 6)
- Sam Sanders – tenor saxophone (3), alto saxophone (7)
- Irene Datcher – vocals (4, 6)
