= Back in Time (James Blood Ulmer album) =

Studio album by Odyssey the Band
- Released: November 2005
- Recorded: May 12, 13 and 18, 2005
- Studio: Orange Bear, West Orange, NJ
- Genre: Jazz
- Length: 55:18
- Label: Pi; Pi 18
- Producer: James Blood Ulmer

James Blood Ulmer chronology
| Birthright (2005) | Back in Time (2005) | Bad Blood in the City: The Piety Street Sessions (2007) |

Back in Time is an album by Odyssey the Band, featuring guitarist James Blood Ulmer, violinist Charles Burnham and drummer Warren Benbow, recorded in 2005 and released on the Pi label. The band is named after Ulmer's 1983 album, Odyssey.

== Reception ==
Professional ratings
Review scores
| Source | Rating |
|---|---|
| AllMusic | 4/5 stars |
| Robert Christgau | A− |
| The Penguin Guide to Jazz Recordings | 3.5/4 stars |
| PopMatters | 8/10 stars |

The AllMusic review by Hal Horowitz states, "the disc crackles because of the largely improv approach of the pieces. Each track supports its own groove, and the interaction of all three players with nobody hogging the spotlight shows the collaborative nature of this project. A slight world beat infuses these tracks, due in part to Ulmer and Burnham's distinctive, atypical approach to their instruments. ... Listeners who appreciate the guitarist/vocalist's forays into the blues will find this to be down a similar dark alley, and those who come to this album through Ulmer's more dissonant jazz work will also find lots to enjoy in Back in Time's timeless and riveting music". Robert Christgau said, "Two decades on, Ulmer is the artiest of all Delta blues imitators, Charles Burnham a fiddler for hire, and Warren Benbow a pensive drummer even on the fast ones. So the beauties of their middle-aged reunion are atmospheric rather than fiery". PopMatters' Will Layman noted, "Back in Time is a welcome return, if a reunion not quite as bold as it seemed the first time around".

== Track listing ==
All compositions by James Blood Ulmer except where noted

1. "Last One" – 4:40
2. "Open Doors" – 6:11
3. "Happy Time" – 5:52
4. "Little Red House" – 5:16
5. "Water Tree" (Charles Burnham) – 5:29
6. "Love Nest" – 5:18
7. "Woman Coming" – 5:45
8. "Channel One" – 7:08
9. "Let's Get Married" – 5:11
10. "Free for Three" (Warren Benbow) – 4:28

== Personnel ==
- James "Blood" Ulmer – guitar, vocals
- Charles Burnham – violin
- Warren Benbow – drums
