= Revealing =

Revealing may refer to:

- Revelation - in religion, the revealing of things to come
  - Book of Revelation - the Biblical book on revelation
- Revealing (album) - James Blood Ulmer album
