= America – Do You Remember the Love? =

Studio album by James Blood Ulmer
- Released: 1987
- Recorded: 1987
- Genre: Jazz
- Label: Blue Note
- Producer: James Blood Ulmer

James Blood Ulmer chronology
Live at the Caravan of Dreams (1986)	America – Do You Remember the Love? (1987)	Original Phalanx (1987)

America – Do You Remember the Love? is an album by American guitarist James Blood Ulmer, recorded in 1987 and released on the Blue Note label. It was Ulmer's only album recorded for the label.

== Reception ==
Professional ratings
Review scores
Source	Rating
AllMusic	4/5 stars

The AllMusic review by Brian Olewnick states, "The album ends up sounding polished but not slick, each composition standing solidly and offering varied pleasures. Different from Odyssey but situated alongside it as one of Ulmer's best".

== Track listing ==
All compositions by James Blood Ulmer

1. "I Belong in the U.S.A." – 6:40
2. "Lady Blue" – 6:17
3. "After Dark" – 6:18
4. "Show Me Your Love, America" – 7:24
5. "Black Sheep" – 3:44
6. "Wings" – 5:31
- Recorded at the Power Station, Quadrosonic and RPM, New York City, in 1987

== Personnel ==
- James "Blood" Ulmer – guitar, vocals
- Bill Laswell – 4, 6 & 8 string basses
- Nicky Skopelitis – 12-string guitar, banjo
- Ronald Shannon Jackson – drums
- Bernard Fowler, Fred Fowler, Muriel Fowler – backing vocals
