= Live at Montmartre (George Adams and Don Pullen album) =

Live album by George Adams-Don Pullen Quartet
- Released: 1985
- Recorded: April 4–5, 1985
- Genre: Jazz
- Length: 50:20
- Label: Timeless

Don Pullen chronology
Don Pullen Plays Monk (1984)	Live at Montmartre (1985)	The Sixth Sense (1985)

George Adams chronology
More Sightings (1984)	Live at Montmartre (1985)	Got Something Good for You (1985)

Live at Montmartre is a live album by the George Adams-Don Pullen Quartet with guitarist John Scofield recorded in 1985 for the Dutch Timeless label.

== Reception ==
The Allmusic review by Don Snowden awarded the album 3 stars stating "Live at Montmarte isn't all it could have been, but sometimes things just don't happen. It sounds like Scofield and the group never found a truly comfortable common ground. They don't clash, but it never feels like they're totally in synch, either, at least not enough to reach the greater-than-the-sum-of-the-quartet-with-guest-soloist-parts level". The Penguin Guide to Jazz awarded the album 3 stars stating "Scofield's unison statement with George on "Forever Lovers" is one of the highlights... As a live document, it's OK, but still not a proper monument to Adams's larger-than-life personality".

Professional ratings
Review scores
Source	Rating
Allmusic	3/5 stars
The Penguin Guide to Jazz	3/4 stars

== Track listing ==
All compositions by Don Pullen except where noted.

1. "I.J." (John Scofield) - 8:07
2. "Flame Games" (George Adams) - 11:30
3. "Well, I Guess We'll Never Know" - 8:27
4. "Forever Lovers" (Adams) - 10:53
5. "Song Everlasting" - 11:23

- Recorded at the Jazzhus Montmartre in Copenhagen on April 4 & 5, 1985

== Personnel ==
- Don Pullen – piano
- George Adams – tenor saxophone
- John Scofield - guitar
- Cameron Brown – bass
- Dannie Richmond – drums
