= New Beginnings (Don Pullen album) =

Studio album by Don Pullen
- Released: 1989
- Recorded: December 16, 1988
- Genre: Jazz
- Length: 38:13
- Label: Blue Note
- Producer: Michael Cuscuna

Don Pullen chronology
Song Everlasting (1987)	New Beginnings (1989)	New York Duets (1989)

New Beginnings is an album by the American jazz pianist Don Pullen, recorded in 1988. It was released in 1989 by Blue Note Records.

== Critical reception ==
Professional ratings
Review scores
Source	Rating
AllMusic	2.5/5 stars

The New York Times wrote that "the furor of the avant-garde language hasn't let up, and the techniques that are the most specific to the 60's—Mr. Pullen's crashing clusters, turning the piano into a whirlwind of percussion—haven't lost their power, nor do they seem dated."

The AllMusic review by Scott Yanow stated that "Pullen sets up fairly simple structures (some of which could be grooves for Ramsey Lewis) and then, after stating the theme, tosses in playful runs that are often quite outside, essentially putting his original style from the 1960s in a slightly commercial 1980s setting." The review says he "plays quite rhythmically during his more intense phrases and displays a sly sense of humor."

== Track listing ==
All compositions by Don Pullen

1. "Jana's Delight" - 5:58
2. "Once Upon a Time" - 5:51
3. "Warriors" - 6:49
4. "New Beginnings" - 6:22
5. "At the Cafe Centrale" - 6:55
6. "Reap the Whirlwind" - 7:04
7. "Silence = Death" - 10:20 Bonus track on CD

- Recorded in New York City on December 16, 1988

== Personnel ==
- Don Pullen – piano
- Gary Peacock – bass
- Tony Williams – drums
