= Birthright (album) =

Studio album by James Blood Ulmer
- Released: May 24, 2005
- Recorded: 2004
- Genre: Blues
- Length: 51:58
- Label: Hyena
- Producer: Vernon Reid

James Blood Ulmer chronology
No Escape from the Blues: The Electric Lady Sessions (2003)	Birthright (2005)	Back in Time (2005)

Birthright is a solo album by American guitarist James Blood Ulmer, recorded in 2004 and released on the Hyena label in 2005.

== Reception ==
Professional ratings
Review scores
Source	Rating
AllMusic	4/5 stars
The Penguin Guide to Jazz Recordings	3.5/4 stars

The AllMusic review by Thom Jurek stated, "Birthright is the album Ulmer should have made years ago. All that matters is that listeners have it now. It's a shining star in his catalog and a chillingly intimate portrait of his expansive vision and singular talent".

Birthright was selected as the Blues Album of the Year in the 2005 DownBeat Readers' Poll.

== Track listing ==
All compositions by James Blood Ulmer except as indicated.

1. "Take My Music Back to the Church" – 4:43
2. "I Can't Take It Anymore" – 2:39
3. "Where Did All the Girls Come From" – 5:06
4. "I Ain't Superstitious" (Willie Dixon) – 3:47
5. "White Man's Jail" – 3:59
6. "High Yellow" – 3:17
7. "The Evil One" – 3:33
8. "Geechee Joe" – 4:13
9. "Love Dance Rag" – 4:08
10. "Sittin' on Top of the World" (Traditional) – 4:13
11. "My Most Favorite Thing" – 2:49
12. "Devil's Got to Burn" – 9:31
  - Recorded at Gigantic Studios, NYC, in 2004

== Personnel ==
- James Blood Ulmer – guitar, vocals, flute
