= Memphis Blood: The Sun Sessions =

Studio album by James Blood Ulmer
- Released: September 4, 2001
- Recorded: April 10, 11 & 12, 2001
- Genre: Blues
- Label: Hyena
- Producer: Vernon Reid

James Blood Ulmer chronology
Blue Blood (2000)	Memphis Blood: The Sun Sessions (2001)	No Escape from the Blues: The Electric Lady Sessions (2003)

Memphis Blood: The Sun Sessions is an album by American guitarist James Blood Ulmer, recorded in and released on the Hyena label in 2001. The album features Ulmer covering fourteen blues standards recorded at Sun Studio.

== Reception ==
The AllMusic review by Thom Jurek stated that "some of the greasiest, knottiest, most surreal blues music ever... Memphis Blood is a fresh injection of blues truth... Ulmer delivers here, big time".

Professional ratings
Review scores
Source	Rating
AllMusic	4/5 stars
The Penguin Guide to Jazz Recordings	3.5/4 stars

== Track listing ==
1. "Spoonful" (Willie Dixon) – 2:58
2. "I Want to Be Loved" (Dixon) – 3:15
3. "Little Red Rooster" (Dixon) – 4:22
4. "Dimples" (James Bracken, John Lee Hooker) – 3:31
5. "I Just Want to Make Love to You" (Dixon) – 3:30
6. "Evil" Willy Dixon – 2:50
7. "Death Letter" (Son House) – 9:41
8. "Fattening Frogs for Snakes" (Willie Williamson) – 2:51
9. "Money" (Hooker) – 3:34
10. "I Love the Life I Live, I Live the Life I Love" (Dixon) – 3:30
11. "Too Lazy to Work, Too Nervous to Steal" (Daylie Holmes, Marl H. Young) – 2:36
12. "Double Trouble" (Otis Rush) – 4:56
13. "I Asked for Water (She Gave Me Gasoline)" (Chester Burnett) – 8:25
14. "Back Door Man" (Dixon) – 3:18

- Recorded at Sun Studio, Memphis, Tennessee, on April 10, 11 & 12, 2001

== Personnel ==
- James Blood Ulmer – guitar, vocals
- Vernon Reid – guitar
- Charles Burnham – violin
- Rick Steff – piano, wurlitzer electric piano, hammond B3 organ
- David Barnes – harmonica
- Mark Peterson – bass
- Aubrey Dayle – drums
