= Original Phalanx =

Studio album by Phalanx
- Released: 1987
- Recorded: February 13 & 14, 1987
- Studio: Sound Ideas, New York City
- Genre: Jazz
- Length: 55:31
- Label: DIW; DIW-8013
- Producer: Kazunori Sugiyama

Phalanx chronology
Got Something Good for You (1986)	Original Phalanx (1987)	In Touch (1988)

James Blood Ulmer chronology
America – Do You Remember the Love? (1987)	Original Phalanx (1987)	Music Revelation Ensemble (1988)

George Adams chronology
Breakthrough (1986)	Original Phalanx (1987)	Song Everlasting (1987)

Original Phalanx is an album by James Blood Ulmer and George Adams' band Phalanx which was recorded in 1987 and released on the Japanese DIW label.

Professional ratings
Review scores
Source	Rating
Allmusic	3/5 stars

== Track listing ==
All compositions by James Blood Ulmer except where noted

1. "Song Number One" – 7:34
2. "Free Spirit" (Sirone) – 7:16
3. "House on 13th Street" (George Adams) – 6:15
4. "Troublemaker" – 8:13
5. "Angel Love" (Sirone) – 9:02
6. "A Smile" (Adams) – 6:04 Additional track on CD release
7. "Playground" (Adams) – 11:07

== Personnel ==
- James Blood Ulmer - guitar
- George Adams - tenor saxophone, flute
- Sirone - bass
- Rashied Ali - drums
