= Hymn of the 3rd Galaxy =

Studio album by Free Form Funky Frēqs
- Released: 2022
- Recorded: 2020–2021
- Studios: Sound Scape Recording Lab, Philadelphia; Tacuma Express Studios, Philadelphia; DharmaLab Shaolin, Staten Island, New York
- Genre: Jazz-funk
- Label: Ropeadope
- Producers: Grant Calvin Weston, Jamaaladeen Tacuma, Vernon Reid

Free Form Funky Frēqs chronology
Bon Vivant (2013)	Hymn of the 3rd Galaxy (2022)

Hymn of the 3rd Galaxy is the third album by American experimental power trio Free Form Funky Frēqs, featuring guitarist Vernon Reid, electric bassist Jamaaladeen Tacuma, and drummer Grant Calvin Weston. It was recorded during 2020–2021 at the musicians' home studios, and was released in 2022 by Ropeadope Records.

The album title pays tribute to the 1973 Return to Forever recording Hymn of the Seventh Galaxy. Reid reflected: "That record was very important in my development... Bill Connors' playing on it is so full of fire, but it's also emotionally vulnerable in a way. I was very affected by the compositions, as well." The titles of most of the individual tracks refer to parts of the Milky Way galaxy.

The musicians are adamant about performing and recording without preconceptions, soundchecks, or rehearsals, and because they play together so infrequently, they are able to assign a number to each encounter, with Hymn of the 3rd Galaxy being the result of meeting number 73. Unlike the previous two FFFF albums, the recording was assembled in an asynchronous fashion, with the musicians contributing tracks from their home studios. In an effort to preserve spontaneity, they insisted that there be no fixes, overdubs, or retakes; Tacuma recalled: "I just closed my eyes and pretended I was onstage with those guys."

== Reception ==
Professional ratings
Review scores
Source	Rating
Tom Hull – on the Web	B+

In an article for NPR Music, Kevin Whitehead noted that the musicians are "heedless of category, blending jazz, funk, R&B, rock and a little space music," and praised their "lively, rhythmic crosstalk." He wrote: "These days, a few top jazz guitarists demonstrate their restraint and good taste on record. So it's bracing to hear Vernon Reid crank it up to 11 and wail so often on the album."

The New York City Jazz Record's John Pietaro stated: "the new album... has impeccable sound, and the improvisations are muscular, melodic and beautifully head-arranged... the selections carry the ear through space and a sound-array of chromatic basslines and pained blues melodies snagged in a sound thicket... Ornette's spirit is never far off, wrapped in decades of voluminous, liberating music."

David R. Adler of Premier Guitar commented: "what explains FFFF's ability to create together on the fly is musical intelligence and empathetic listening." He described Reid's contribution as "an amalgam of raw, plugged-in lead guitar crunch and otherwordly sonic glitter: notes that start as notes but become starbursts, or decay like pyrotechnic embers; chordal shapes that overlap and gather into big nebulous clouds."

== Track listing ==
All music composed by Vernon Reid, Jamaaladeen Tacuma, and Grant Calvin Weston.

1. "Earth" – 3:06
2. "Galactic Bar" – 2:10
3. "Near Arm" – 6:49
4. "Far 3 kpc" – 3:48
5. "Outer Arm" – 5:23
6. "Orion Spur" – 4:39
7. "Perseus Arm" – 2:57
8. "Sagittarius Arm" – 2:57
9. "Scutum Centaurus" – 3:57
10. "Sun" – 5:30
11. "Galactic Longitude" – 0:35

== Personnel ==
- Vernon Reid – guitar, electronics
- Jamaaladeen Tacuma – electric bass
- Grant Calvin Weston – drums
