= America (George Adams album) =

Studio album by George Adams
- Released: 1990
- Recorded: May 24–25, June 29, and July 9–10 & 18, 1989
- Studios: A & R, New York City, New York
- Genre: Jazz
- Length: 52:41
- Label: Blue Note
- Producer: Kazunori Sugiyama

George Adams chronology
Nightingale (1989)	America (1990)	Old Feeling (1991)

America is an album by saxophonist George Adams, recorded in 1989 and released on the Blue Note label the following year.

== Reception ==
Professional ratings
Review scores
Source	Rating
AllMusic	4.5/5 stars
Los Angeles Times	4/5 stars

The AllMusic review by Scott Yanow states, "This is one of tenor saxophonist George Adams' funnest records. He takes eight songs, all of which now qualify as American folk songs (along with two originals), and gives them melodic but inventive treatments... This CD is accessible, patriotic, and a highly recommended and continually surprising set". In the Los Angeles Times, Don Heckman called it "an unusual contemporary jazz outing" and wrote, "Tenor saxophonist Adams takes an interesting risk with this collection of songs from what he calls the 'mainstream of Americana'... For the most part, it pays off. Adams' big blowzy sound and brusquely rhythmic articulation bring a vigorous, almost folk-like slant to these familiar songs".

== Track listing ==
1. "America the Beautiful" (Samuel A. Ward, Katharine Lee Bates) − 3:59
2. "Tennessee Waltz" (Pee Wee King, Redd Stewart) − 6:48
3. "Motivation" (George Adams) − 4:34
4. "Old Folks at Home" (Stephen Foster) − 5:33
5. "Gee, Baby, Ain't I Good to You" (Andy Razaf, Don Redman) − 7:18
6. "Take Me Out to the Ball Game" (Jack Norworth, Albert Von Tilzer) − 2:41
7. "You Are My Sunshine" (Jimmie Davis, Charles Mitchell) − 5:05
8. "Georgia on My Mind" (Hoagy Carmichael, Stuart Gorrell) − 8:14
9. "Have You Thanked America?" (Adams) − 6:49
10. "The Star-Spangled Banner" (Francis Scott Key) − 1:40

== Personnel ==
- George Adams – tenor saxophone, flute, vocals
- Hugh Lawson – piano
- Cecil McBee – bass
- Mark Johnson – drums
