= Breakthrough (George Adams and Don Pullen album) =

Studio album by Don Pullen-George Adams Quartet
- Released: 1986
- Recorded: April 30, 1986
- Genre: Jazz
- Length: 39:19
- Label: Blue Note

Don Pullen chronology
The Sixth Sense (1985)	Breakthrough (1986)	Song Everlasting (1987)

George Adams chronology
Got Something Good for You (1985)	Breakthrough (1986)	Original Phalanx (1987)

Breakthrough is an album by the Don Pullen-George Adams Quartet, recorded in 1986 for the Blue Note label.

== Reception ==
The AllMusic review by Richard S. Ginell stated: "Throughout the record, the band's creativity burns at white heat, making this disc a good first choice for newcomers to Pullen".

Professional ratings
Review scores
Source	Rating
AllMusic	4.5/5 stars
Robert Christgau	A

== Track listing ==
All compositions by Don Pullen except as indicated

1. "Mr. Smoothie" (George Adams) - 6:07
2. "Just Foolin' Around" - 6:20
3. "Song from the Old Country" - 8:13
4. "We've Been Here All the Time" - 9:09
5. "A Time for Sobriety" (Adams) - 9:43
6. "The Necessary Blues (or: Thank You Very Much Mr Monk)" - 13:35 Bonus track on CD only
- Recorded at RCA Studio A in New York City on April 30, 1986

== Personnel ==
- Don Pullen – piano
- George Adams – tenor saxophone
- Cameron Brown – bass
- Dannie Richmond – drums
