= No Escape from the Blues: The Electric Lady Sessions =

Studio album by James Blood Ulmer
- Released: September 9, 2003
- Recorded: April 23, 24 & 25, 2003
- Genre: Blues
- Label: Hyena
- Producer: Vernon Reid

James Blood Ulmer chronology
Memphis Blood: The Sun Sessions (2001)	No Escape from the Blues: The Electric Lady Sessions (2003)	Birthright (2004)

No Escape from the Blues: The Electric Lady Sessions is an album by American guitarist James Blood Ulmer recorded in and released on the Hyena label in 2003. The album features Ulmer covering ten blues standards and two of his own compositions (including "Are You Glad to Be in America?") recorded at Electric Lady Studios in New York City.

== Reception ==
Professional ratings
Review scores
Source	Rating
AllMusic	3.5/5 stars
The Penguin Guide to Jazz Recordings	3/4 stars

The AllMusic review by Thom Jurek stated, "No Escape From the Blues features Ulmer in a unique role, that of the blues singer and shouter. Never has he sounded so expressive, emotionally compelling, or convincing vocally; and his guitar playing, while less present here than on his other recordings, is still there, snaking its way through this weird yet wonderful set. Highly recommended. This recording is indeed 'future blues'."

== Track listing ==
1. "Goin' to New York" (Mary Lee Reed) – 4:24
2. "Hustle Is On" (Eddy H. Owens) – 2:39
3. "Who's Been Talkin'" (Chester Burnett) – 3:25
4. "Ghetto Child" (Johnny Copeland) – 5:51
5. "Are You Glad to Be in America" (James Blood Ulmer) – 4:00
6. "You Know, I Know" (John Lee Hooker) – 4:16
7. "Let the Good Times Roll" (Earl King) – 4:12
8. "Bright Lights, Big City" (Jimmy Reed) – 6:03
9. "No Escape from the Blues" (McKinley Morganfield, Charles Edward Williams) – 3:32
10. "Satisfy (Story of My Life)" (Ulmer) – 2:02
11. "Trouble in Mind" (Richard M. Jones) – 4:43
12. "The Blues Had a Baby and Called It Rock N Roll" (Brownie McGhee, McKinley Morganfield) – 3:44

- Recorded at Electric Lady Studios, New York on April 23, 24 & 25, 2003

== Personnel ==
- James Blood Ulmer – guitar, vocals
- Vernon Reid – guitar
- Charles Burnham – violin
- Leon Gruenbaum – piano, keyboards
- David Barnes – harmonica
- Mark Peterson – bass
- Aubrey Dayle – drums
- Queen Esther – vocals
- Olu Dara – pocket trumpet
- John Kruth – tanpura
- Maya Smullyan Jenkins – tap
