= Revealing (album) =

Studio album by James "Blood" Ulmer
- Released: 1990
- Recorded: 1977
- Studio: New York City
- Genre: Jazz, post-bop, free jazz, harmolodics
- Length: 36:26
- Label: In + Out Records
- Producer: James "Blood" Ulmer

James Blood Ulmer chronology
Revealing (1990)	Tales of Captain Black (1978)

Revealing is an album by American guitarist James Blood Ulmer featuring George Adams, Cecil McBee, and Doug Hammond recorded in 1977 and released for the first time in 1990 on the In + Out label.

== Reception ==
Allmusic awarded the album 4 stars, and reviewer Thom Jurek states, "Revealing is more than just fascinating listening to hear the development in Blood Ulmer's playing and compositional ideas, it's a solid jazz date with visionary players taking a new turn with the music and seeing how fast they can drive it down the road. While it does not contain the sheer drama of Tales of Captain Black or Are You Glad to Be in America? because it's a fairly laid-back date, it does contain all of their musical qualities".

Professional ratings
Review scores
Source	Rating
Allmusic	4/5 stars

== Track listing ==
All compositions by James Blood Ulmer

1. "Revealing" - 8:15
2. "Raw Groove" - 8:49
3. "Overtime" - 9:01
4. "Love Nest" - 10:05

== Personnel ==
- James Blood Ulmer - guitar
- George Adams – tenor saxophone
- Cecil McBee - bass
- Doug Hammond - drums
