= After Dark (Music Revelation Ensemble album) =

Studio album by Music Revelation Ensemble
- Released: 1992
- Recorded: October 9 & 10, 1991
- Studios: Power Station, New York City
- Genre: Jazz
- Length: 68:54
- Labels: DIW; DIW 855
- Producers: James Blood Ulmer & Kazunori Sugiyama

Music Revelation Ensemble chronology
Elec. Jazz (1990)	After Dark (1992)	In the Name of... (1994)

James Blood Ulmer chronology
Black and Blues (1991)	After Dark (1992)	Blues Preacher (1993)

After Dark is an album by James Blood Ulmer's Music Revelation Ensemble recorded in 1991 and released on the Japanese DIW label featuring performances by Ulmer with David Murray, Amin Ali and Cornell Rochester.

== Reception ==
Professional ratings
Review scores
Source	Rating
AllMusic	4/5 stars

The AllMusic review by Thom Jurek awarded the album 4 stars, stating, "MRE is fast becoming Ulmer's most successful and consistent outlet. What's more because of its innovation and hard rocking intensity and groove, it's totally fine to say you like jazz-rock again".

== Track listing ==
All compositions by James Blood Ulmer

1. "Interview" – 7:36
2. "Never Mind" – 12:15
3. "Maya" – 10:05
4. "After Dark" – 12:45
5. "Back Talk" – 7:15
6. "What's Your Name" – 10:27
7. "Iceman" – 8:31

== Personnel ==
- James Blood Ulmer – guitar
- David Murray – tenor saxophone
- Amin Ali – electric bass
- Cornell Rochester – drums

On track 4 add the Intercity String Quartet:

- Ronald Lawrence – viola
- Jason K. Hwang, Rudi Berger – violin
- Michelle Kinney – cello
