= Blue Blood (James Blood Ulmer album) =

Studio album by James Blood Ulmer
- Released: April 17, 2001
- Recorded: 2000
- Genre: Jazz
- Label: Innerythmic
- Producer: Bill Laswell, James Blood Ulmer

James Blood Ulmer chronology
Reunion (1998)	Blue Blood (2001)	Memphis Blood: The Sun Sessions (2001)

Blue Blood is an album by American guitarist James Blood Ulmer, recorded in 2000 and released on Bill Laswell's Innerhythmic label in 2001. The album features performances by Ulmer with Laswell, Bernie Worrell, and Amina Claudine Myers, who initially recorded South Delta Space Age as Third Rail in 1995.

== Reception ==
AllMusic awarded the album 4 stars and the review by Thom Jurek stated that "there is a deep nighttime feeling to this disc; there are few tracks featuring the fire-spitting, wood-splintering knot-like runs that come flailing off the strings and melt the brain of the listener. This is a riff- and song-oriented recording (yes, there are vocals) that accent the blues and gospel side of Ulmer's playing... There are one or two misses here, but they're no big deal compared to the wealth of good stuff".

Professional ratings
Review scores
Source	Rating
AllMusic	4/5 stars
The Penguin Guide to Jazz Recordings	3/4 stars

== Track listing ==
All compositions by James Blood Ulmer except as indicated

1. "O Gentle One" – 6:06
2. "As It Is" (Jerome Brailey, Bill Laswell, Ulmer) – 5:25
3. "99 Names" (Traditional arranged Ulmer) – 4:55
4. "On and On" (Jamal Cantero, Erica Wright) – 3:56
5. "Pull on up to Love" – 4:46
6. "Momentarily" (Brailey, Laswell, Ulmer) – 5:56
7. "We Got to Get Together" – 5:28
8. "I Can Tell" – 4:42
9. "Home Alone" – 6:59
- Recorded at Orange Music, Orange NJ

== Personnel ==
- James Blood Ulmer – guitar, vocals
- Bill Laswell – bass
- Bernie Worrell, Amina Claudine Myers – keyboards
- Jerome Bigfoot Brailey – drums
