= Old Feeling =

Studio album by George Adams
- Released: 1991
- Studio: Clinton
- Genre: Jazz
- Label: Somethin' Else/Blue Note
- Producer: Kazunori Sugiyama

George Adams chronology
America (1990)	Old Feeling (1991)

Old Feeling is an album by the American musician George Adams. It was released by Somethin' Else and Blue Note Records. Adams played the tenor sax; he also sang on some tracks.

== Production ==
The album was produced by Kazunori Sugiyama. It contains versions of Charles Mingus's "Better Git Hit in Yo' Soul" and Billy Joel's "Just the Way You Are". Jean-Paul Bourelly played guitar on Old Feeling; Hannibal Marvin Peterson played trumpet.

== Critical reception ==
Professional ratings
Review scores
Source	Rating
AllMusic	4/5 stars
The Buffalo News	4.5/5 stars
The Encyclopedia of Popular Music	4/5 stars
The Indianapolis Star	3/4 stars
MusicHound Jazz: The Essential Album Guide	4/5 stars

The Chicago Tribune wrote that "a rollicking, raucous spirit energizes this recording." The Toronto Star deemed the album "a rough-and-tumble vintage blast." The Lawrence Journal-World admired the opening track, writing that "Adams wails with a manic spark oscillating somewhere between James Brown r&b and the 'free thing' explosiveness of the 1960s black, avant garde."

The Indianapolis Star stated: "A lapse of intensity comes with the finale, Billy Joel's 'Just the Way You Are', which reverses another cliche—that good jazzmen always redeem cheap tunes." The Buffalo News called Old Feeling "one of the great jazz albums of the year," and praised Adams's "marvelously outsized, earthy gestures." USA Today labeled the band "wild, woolly, roaring, precise, funny, sometimes quite tender and always on fire, no matter the tempo."

AllMusic noted that, "unlike some other avant-gardists who seem to lose their personality and purpose when they play standard material, Adams turns even overplayed songs into his own inventive devices." MusicHound Jazz: The Essential Album Guide considered the album "delightfully strange but potent."

== Track listing ==
No.	Title	Length
1.	"Better Git Hit in Yo' Soul"
2.	"That Old Feeling"
3.	"The Wanderer"
4.	"As Time Goes By"
5.	"Melody for Monet"
6.	"The Cry"
7.	"Teamwork"
8.	"Just the Way You Are"

== Personnel ==
- George Adams – tenor saxophone, vocals
- Ray Gallon – piano
- Lewis Nash – drums
- Santi DeBriano – double bass
- Jean Paul Bourelly – guitar
- Hannibal Marvin Peterson – trumpet
