= Song Everlasting =

Studio album by Don Pullen-George Adams Quartet
- Released: 1987
- Recorded: April 21, 1987
- Genre: Jazz
- Length: 48:36
- Label: Blue Note

Don Pullen chronology
Breakthrough (1986)	Song Everlasting (1987)	New Beginnings (1988)

George Adams chronology
Original Phalanx (1987)	Song Everlasting (1987)	In Touch (1988)

Song Everlasting is an album by the Don Pullen-George Adams Quartet recorded in 1987 for the Blue Note label.

== Reception ==
The Allmusic review by Richard S. Ginell awarded the album 4 stars stating "a jubilant followup to Breakthrough, which marked the group's American label debut. Here there is a little more stylistic diversity, along with plenty of melodic invention and fireworks on the outside".

Professional ratings
Review scores
Source	Rating
Allmusic	4/5 stars

== Track listing ==
All compositions by Don Pullen except as indicated

1. "Sun Watchers" (George Adams) 5:43
2. "Serenade for Sariah (Adams) 7:35
3. "1529 Gunn Street" - 6:14
4. "Warm Up" - 9:50
5. "Sing Me a Song Everlasting" - 10:30
6. "Another Reason to Celebrate" - 8:44 Bonus track on CD only

- Recorded in New York City on April 21, 1987

== Personnel ==
- Don Pullen – piano
- George Adams – tenor saxophone, flute
- Cameron Brown – bass
- Dannie Richmond – drums
