= The Sixth Sense (Don Pullen album) =

Studio album by Don Pullen
- Released: 1985
- Recorded: June 12 & 13, 1985
- Genre: Jazz
- Length: 40:09
- Label: Black Saint
- Producer: Giovanni Bondarini

Don Pullen chronology
Live at Montmartre (1985)	The Sixth Sense (1985)	Breakthrough (1985)

The Sixth Sense is an album by American jazz pianist Don Pullen recorded in 1985 for the Italian Black Saint label.

== Reception ==
The Allmusic review by Stephen Cook awarded the album 4 stars stating "Reflecting Pullen's own quality piano work, all the soloists make impressive contributions throughout. A nice place to start for the Pullen newcomer".

Professional ratings
Review scores
Source	Rating
Allmusic	4/5 stars
The Penguin Guide to Jazz Recordings	3.5/4 stars

== Track listing ==
All compositions by Don Pullen except as indicated

1. "The Sixth Sense" (Don Pullen, Frank Dean)- 9:46
2. "In the Beginning" - 11:56
3. "Tales From the Bright Side" - 8:53
4. "Gratitude" - 7:36
5. "All Is Well" - 1:58

- Recorded at Classic Sound Studios in New York City on June 12 & 13, 1985

== Personnel ==
- Don Pullen - piano
- Olu Dara - trumpet
- Donald Harrison - alto saxophone
- Fred Hopkins - bass
- Bobby Battle - drums
