= Charles Burnham (musician) =

American violinist and composer

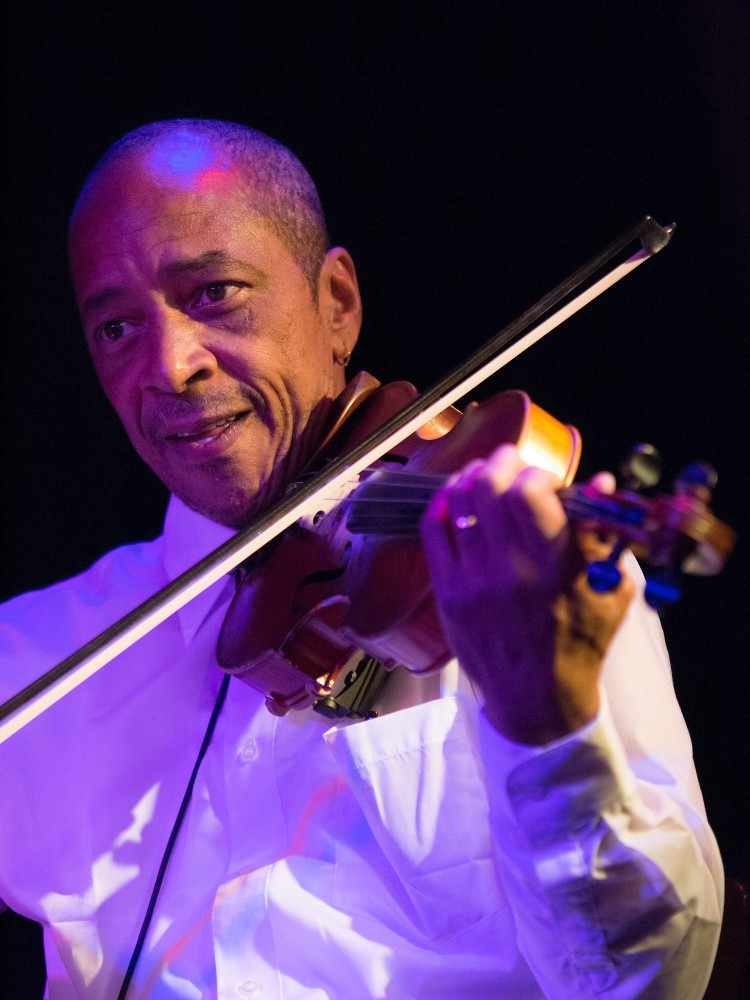
- Burnham in 2013

Background information
- Also known as: Charlie Burnham
- Born: 1950 (age 75–76)
- Genres: Jazz; pop
- Occupation: Musician
- Instruments: Violin; mandolin
- Years active: 1983–present

Charles Burnham (born 1950; also known as Charlie Burnham) is an American violinist and composer. His music spans multiple genres, including bluegrass, delta punk,free jazz, blues, classical and chamber jazz. He often performs with a wah-wah pedal. He initially became renowned for his work on James "Blood" Ulmer's Odyssey album. The musicians on that album later performed and recorded as Odyssey the Band, sometimes known as The Odyssey Band. He was also a member of the String Trio of New York, and currently plays in the 52nd Street Blues Project, Hidden City, We Free StRings, Improvising Chamber Ensemble and the Kropotkins.

== Session work ==
He has played on recordings by Living Colour, Susie Ibarra, Cassandra Wilson, Steven Bernstein, Queen Esther, Peter Apfelbaum, Henry Threadgill, Ted Daniel, Medeski Martin & Wood, The Woes, Hem, Elysian Fields, Adam Rudolph, Jonah Smith, The Heavy Circles, Mario Pavone, Joan As Police Woman, Rick Moranis, Doug Wamble, Steve Swell, John Zorn, Rufus Wainwright, Gabrielle Roth, Robert Musso, Jai Uttal, Soul Syndicate, Bobby Paunetto, Krishna Das, Sasha Dobson, Kenny Wollesen, Kato Hideki, Norah Jones, Billie Joe Armstrong, Emily Coates and Jason Kao Hwang.

== Notable recordings ==
- James Blood Ulmer – Odyssey (1983)
- James Blood Ulmer – Part Time (1984)
- James Blood Ulmer – Live at the Caravan of Dreams (1985)
- String Trio of New York & Jay Clayton – String Trio of New York & Jay Clayton (1988)
- Living Colour – Time's Up (1990)
- String Trio of New York – Time Never Lies (1990)
- String Trio of New York – Ascendant (1991)
- Cassandra Wilson – Blue Light 'til Dawn (1993)
- Cassandra Wilson – New Moon Daughter (1995)
- James "Blood" Ulmer – Forbidden Blues (1996)
- Odyssey the Band – Reunion (1998)
- The Kropotkins – Five Points Crawl (2000)
- James "Blood" Ulmer – Memphis Blood: The Sun Sessions (2001)
- Masada – Voices in the Wilderness (2003)
- James "Blood" Ulmer – No Escape from the Blues: The Electric Lady Sessions (2003)
- 52nd Street Blues Project – Blues & Grass (2004)
- Odyssey the Band – Back in Time (2005)
- Joan as Police Woman – Real Life (2006)
- Rob Reddy's Gift Horse – A Hundred Jumping Devils (2006)
- Steven Bernstein's Millennial Territory Orchestra – MTO, Vol. 1 (2006)
- Mario Pavone – Deez to Blues (Playscape, 2006)
- James "Blood" Ulmer – Bad Blood in the City: The Piety Street Sessions (2007)
- Steven Bernstein's Millennial Territory Orchestra – We Are MTO (2008)
- The Kropotkins – Paradise Square (2009)
- Steven Bernstein's Millennial Territory Orchestra – MTO plays Sly (2011)
- Charlie Burnham / Tony Jones / Kenny Wollesen – Pitch, Rhythm and Consciousness (2011)
- Hem –Departure & Farewell (2013)
- Billie Joe Armstrong / Norah Jones – Foreverly (2013)
- The Kropotkins – Portents of Love (2015)
- Cassandra Wilson – Coming Forth by Day (2015)
