= More Sightings =

Live album by George Adams, Hannibal & Friends
- Released: 1984
- Recorded: September 9, 1984
- Venue: Bazillus Club, Zürich, Switzerland
- Genre: Jazz
- Length: 40:12
- Label: Enja; 4084
- Producer: Stefan Winter

George Adams chronology
| Decisions (1984) | More Sightings (1984) | Live at Montmartre (1985) |

Marvin "Hannibal" Peterson chronology
| The Angels of Atlanta (1981) | More Sightings (1984) | Visions of a New World (1989) |

More Sightings is an album by saxophonist George Adams and trumpeter Marvin "Hannibal" Peterson which was recorded in Switzerland in 1984 and released on the Enja label.

== Reception ==
Professional ratings
Review scores
| Source | Rating |
|---|---|
| AllMusic | 3/5 stars |

The AllMusic review by Scott Yanow stated "The intense tenor saxophonist George Adams teams up with trumpeter Marvin "Hannibal" Peterson, guitarist John Scofield and an alert rhythm section... The music has its strong moments, although nothing all that memorable occurs".

== Track listing ==
1. "More Sightings" (George Adams) – 5:00
2. "Don't Take Your Love From Me" (Henry Nemo) – 6:47
3. "Soul Brother" ("Hannibal" Marvin Peterson) – 7:33
4. "Do We Know Where We Are Going?" (John Scofield) – 5:07
5. "Melanie" (Peterson) – 8:57
6. "I Could Really Go for You" (Adams) – 6:48

== Personnel ==
- George Adams – tenor saxophone, vocal
- Marvin "Hannibal" Peterson – trumpet
- John Scofield – guitar
- Ron Burton – piano
- Walter Schmocker – bass
- Allen Nelson – drums
