= Warren Benbow =

American drummer (1954–2024)

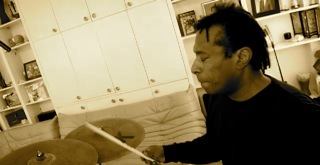
- Benbow in 2011

Background information
- Born: December 22, 1954; New York City, New York, United States
- Died: September 29, 2024 (aged 69) New York City, New York, United States
- Genres: Jazz
- Occupation: Drummer
- Instrument: Percussion

Warren Benbow (December 22, 1954 – September 29, 2024) was a drummer who worked with Nina Simone, Jimmy Owens, Larry Willis, Eddie Gómez, Olu Dara, Michael Urbaniak, Teruo Nakamura, and was an original member of James Blood Ulmer's band, Odyssey.

== Career ==
At the High School of Performing Arts, Benbow studied drums and percussion with Warren Smith and Morris Goldenberg of the Juilliard School. Later at Mannes College he studied with Walter Rosenberger, also of the New York Philharmonic, and with Dong Wong Park.

While studying in the Jazzmobile with Freddie Waits and Albert “Tootie” Heath, Benbow was introduced by Waits to jazz vocalist Betty Carter, and his career as a professional drummer began. He toured with Ulmer and played on Ulmer's albums Odyssey, Bloody Guitar, Part Time, Live At The Caravan Of Dreams, and Reunion. In addition to his jazz work, Benbow worked on Broadway, and also worked in pop with Whitney Houston, Gwen Guthrie, LL Cool J, SWV, and Mary J. Blige.

In 2011, Benbow toured Europe with Ulmer's reformed Odyssey band. Benbow died on September 29, 2024.

== Discography ==
with Luther Thomas

- yo' Momma (Moers Music)

With James Blood Ulmer

- Odyssey (Columbia, 1983)
- Part Time (Rough Trade, 1984)
- Live at the Caravan of Dreams (Caravan of Dreams, 1985)
- Reunion (Knitting Factory, 1998) - as Odyssey the Band
- Back in Time (Pi, 2005) - as Odyssey the Band
- Blues Odyssey (American Revelation Music, 2010)

With Larry Willis

- Inner Crisis (Groove Merchant, 1973)
