= Part Time (album) =

Live album by James Blood Ulmer
- Released: 1984
- Recorded: July 21, 1983
- Venue: Montreux Jazz Festival, Montreux, Switzerland
- Genre: Jazz
- Length: 32:21
- Label: Rough Trade; ROUGH 65

James Blood Ulmer chronology
Odyssey (1983)	Part Time (1984)	Live at the Caravan of Dreams (1985)

Part Time is a live album by the guitarist James Blood Ulmer with the violinist Charlie Burnham and the drummer Warren Benbrow, recorded at the Montreux Jazz Festival in 1983 and released on the Rough Trade label.

== Reception ==
Professional ratings
Review scores
Source	Rating
AllMusic	3/5 stars
Robert Christgau	B+

Robert Christgau wrote: "Cut at Montreux around the time of Odyssey, Ulmer's strongest LP, this repeats four titles and is close to his weakest. The live recording dulls his sonic concept ... Which isn't to say he doesn't still outrock Pat Metheny"

== Track listing ==
All compositions by James Blood Ulmer

1. "Part Time" – 4:55
2. "Little Red House" – 5:40
3. "Love Dance" – 6:39
4. "Encore" – 2:59
5. "Are You Glad to Be in America?" – 3:38
6. "Swings & Things" – 3:27
7. "Mr. Tight Hat" – 5:03

== Personnel ==
- James Blood Ulmer – guitar, vocals
- Charles Burnham – violin
- Warren Benbow – drums
