= Tales of Captain Black =

Studio album by James Blood Ulmer
- Released: 1979
- Recorded: December 5, 1978
- Genre: Jazz
- Length: 33:32
- Label: Artists House
- Producer: John Snyder, Ornette Coleman

James Blood Ulmer chronology
Revealing (1977)	Tales of Captain Black (1979)	Are You Glad to Be in America? (1980)

DIW Records Cover

Tales of Captain Black is an album by American guitarist James Blood Ulmer (credited simply as "James Blood" on the cover), featuring Ornette Coleman, Jamaaladeen Tacuma, and Denardo Coleman, recorded in 1978 and originally released on the Artists House label. It was coproduced by Ornette. The album was remastered and rereleased on CD with a new mix by Joe Ferla approved and co-produced by Ulmer on the Japanese DIW label in 1996.

== Reception ==
Professional ratings
Review scores
Source	Rating
AllMusic	5/5 stars
Christgau's Record Guide	A−
DownBeat	4.5/5 stars
The Rolling Stone Jazz Record Guide	3/5 stars

The Globe and Mail wrote that "the guitarist has taken Hendrix several steps further; he creates textures instead of solos in which only the merest of melodic fragments survive." Downbeat reviewer Jim Brinsfield wrote, "Blood vibrates to a new decade’s esthetic being hammered out by a hyper pool of artists now gathered in New York City who are combining certain forms of experimental rock with the improvisational aspects of jazz."

The AllMusic review by Thom Jurek stated: "Safe to say, there are no weak tracks on Tales From Captain Black, and even the redo of 'Revealing' from Ulmer's previous album show an unbridled excitement and an extrapolation of that tune's rhythmic and harmonic elements into something more sinister, more driven, more angular, more mercurial." Trouser Press wrote: "Ulmer's debut finds him heavily indebted to the saxophonist. Tales of Captain Black offers Ulmer's trademark knotted, choked phrasing as a rough-hewn foil to Coleman's pure, free melodocism, but he hasn't fully discovered his own voice yet."

== Track listing ==
All compositions by James Blood Ulmer

1. "Theme from Captain Black" - 3:14
2. "Moons Shine" - 3:52
3. "Morning Bride" - 4:57
4. "Revelation March" - 4:32
5. "Woman Coming" - 3:38
6. "Nothing to Say" - 4:13
7. "Arena" - 4:24
8. "Revealing" - 4:42

Recorded at R.P.M. Sound Studios, Inc., New York City, December 5, 1978.

== Personnel ==
- James Blood Ulmer – guitar
- Ornette Coleman – alto saxophone
- Jamaaladeen Tacuma – electric bass
- Denardo Coleman – drums
