= Nightingale (George Adams album) =

Studio album by George Adams
- Released: 1989
- Recorded: August 19 & 20, 1988
- Studio: A & R Recording, NYC
- Genre: Jazz
- Length: 48:43
- Label: Blue Note; B1-91984
- Producer: Kazunori Sugiyama, Hitoshi Namekata

George Adams chronology
In Touch (1988)	Nightingale (1989)	America (1990)

Nightingale is an album by saxophonist George Adams which was recorded in 1988 and released on the Blue Note label the following year.

== Reception ==
Professional ratings
Review scores
Source	Rating
Allmusic	2/5 stars

The Allmusic review by Scott Yanow states "This is an odd session that should [have] been much more successful. ... Adams puts plenty of feeling into the melodies, but some really cannot be saved".

== Track listing ==
1. "Bridge over Troubled Water" (Paul Simon) – 7:18
2. "What a Wonderful World" (George Douglas, George David Weiss) – 5:27
3. "Cry Me a River" (Arthur Hamilton) – 4:35
4. "A Nightingale Sang in Berkeley Square" (Manning Sherwin, Eric Maschwitz) – 9:58
5. "Moon River" (Henry Mancini, Johnny Mercer) – 5:57
6. "Precious Lord, Take My Hand" (Thomas A. Dorsey) – 3:42
7. "Ol' Man River" (Oscar Hammerstein II, Jerome Kern) – 7:42
8. "Going Home" (Antonín Dvořák) – 5:04

== Personnel ==
- George Adams – tenor saxophone, soprano saxophone, flute
- Hugh Lawson – piano
- Sirone – bass
- Victor Lewis – drums
