= In and Out (album) =

Studio album by James Blood Ulmer
- Released: 2009
- Recorded: August 15 & 16, 2008
- Studio: Klangstudio Leyh, Sandhausen, Germany
- Genre: Jazz
- Length: 53:20
- Label: In+Out; IOR CD 77100
- Producer: Frank Kleinschmidt, James Blood Ulmer

James Blood Ulmer chronology
Black Rock Reunion Live (2009)	In and Out (2009)

In and Out is an album by American guitarist James Blood Ulmer, recorded in 2009 and released on the German In+Out label.

== Reception ==
Professional ratings
Review scores
Source	Rating
All About Jazz	3.5/5 stars

The All About Jazz review by Dan Bilawsky awarded the album 3 1/2 stars, and stated, "Throughout these ten tracks, Ulmer—joined by bassist Mark E. Peterson and drummer Aubrey Dayle—journeys through bold blues music, self-styled swing, psychedelic rock and far-reaching free jazz." The Independent's Phil Johnson said that "guitarist/ vocalist Ulmer sounds like an even bluesier version of his former self, oddly accented rhythmic flurries poised somewhere between Ornette Coleman and Jimi Hendrix".

== Track listing ==
All compositions by James Blood Ulmer

1. "No Man's Land" – 4:27
2. "A Thing for Joe" – 5:54
3. "Fat Mama" – 6:09
4. "Eviction" – 4:14
5. "Baby Talk" – 4:03
6. "Maya" – 7:46
7. "My Woman" – 4:35
8. "High Yellow" – 5:12
9. "I Believe in You" – 5:22
10. "Backbiter" – 5:38

== Personnel ==
- James Blood Ulmer – guitar, vocals, flute
- Mark Peterson – electric bass, acoustic bass
- Aubrey Dayle – drums, backing vocals
