= Phalanx (band) =

- Genres: Jazz
- Years active: 1986–1988
- Past members: James Blood Ulmer; Rashied Ali; George Adams; Sirone

Phalanx was a jazz quartet featuring guitarist James "Blood" Ulmer, drummer Rashied Ali, tenor saxophonist George Adams, and bassist Sirone. They released three albums: Got Something Good for You (1986), Original Phalanx (1987) and In Touch (1988). They've been described as "an ad-hoc supergroup that thrived and disappeared."

While the quartet is said to have moved on after the 1980s, they played a show at the Museum of Natural History in 1991.
