= Music Revelation Ensemble =

Studio album by Music Revelation Ensemble
- Released: 1988
- Recorded: February 3 & 4, 1988
- Studio: A&R Recording, New York City
- Genre: Jazz
- Length: 58:36
- Label: DIW; DIW 825
- Producer: Kazunori Sugiyama

Music Revelation Ensemble chronology
No Wave (1980)	Music Revelation Ensemble (1988)	Elec. Jazz (1990)

James Blood Ulmer chronology
Original Phalanx (1987)	Music Revelation Ensemble (1988)	In Touch (1988)

Music Revelation Ensemble is the second album by James Blood Ulmer's Music Revelation Ensemble featuring saxophonist David Murray, bassist Jamaaladeen Tacuma and drummer Ronald Shannon Jackson, recorded in 1988 and released on the Japanese DIW label.

== Reception ==
Allmusic awarded the album 4 stars.

Professional ratings
Review scores
Source	Rating
Allmusic	4/5 stars

== Track listing ==
All compositions by James Blood Ulmer except as indicated

1. "Bodytalk" - 12:43
2. "Playtime" - 11:33
3. "Nisa" - 11:53
4. "Street Bride" - 8:45
5. "Blues for David" - 5:01
6. "Burn!" (Ronald Shannon Jackson, David Murray, Kazunori Sugiyama, Jamaaladeen Tacuma, James Blood Ulmer) - 8:41

== Personnel ==
- James Blood Ulmer - guitar
- David Murray - tenor saxophone
- Jamaaladeen Tacuma - electric bass
- Ronald Shannon Jackson - drums
