= Amos White =

American jazz musician

Amos White (November 6, 1889 – July 2, 1980) was an American jazz trumpeter.

White grew up an orphan in Charleston, South Carolina, where he played in the Jenkins Orphanage band in his teens in addition to traveling with minstrel shows and traveling circuses. After attending Benedict College, he returned to the orphanage to take a teaching position. During World War I White played in the 816th Pioneer Infantry Band in France, and settled in New Orleans after the war. Working as a typesetter, he played jazz in his spare time, working with Papa Celestin and Fate Marable among others. In the 1920s, he appeared on many records by blues singers such as Bessie Smith and Lizzie Miles, and played in the Alabamians. In 1928, he became the leader of the Georgia Minstrels.

In the 1930s, White moved to Phoenix, Arizona, where he played with his own group and with local dance groups, including Felipe Lopez's. Later in the decade he relocated to Oakland, California, where he played locally into the 1960s in marching bands.
