= Alberto Porro Carmona =

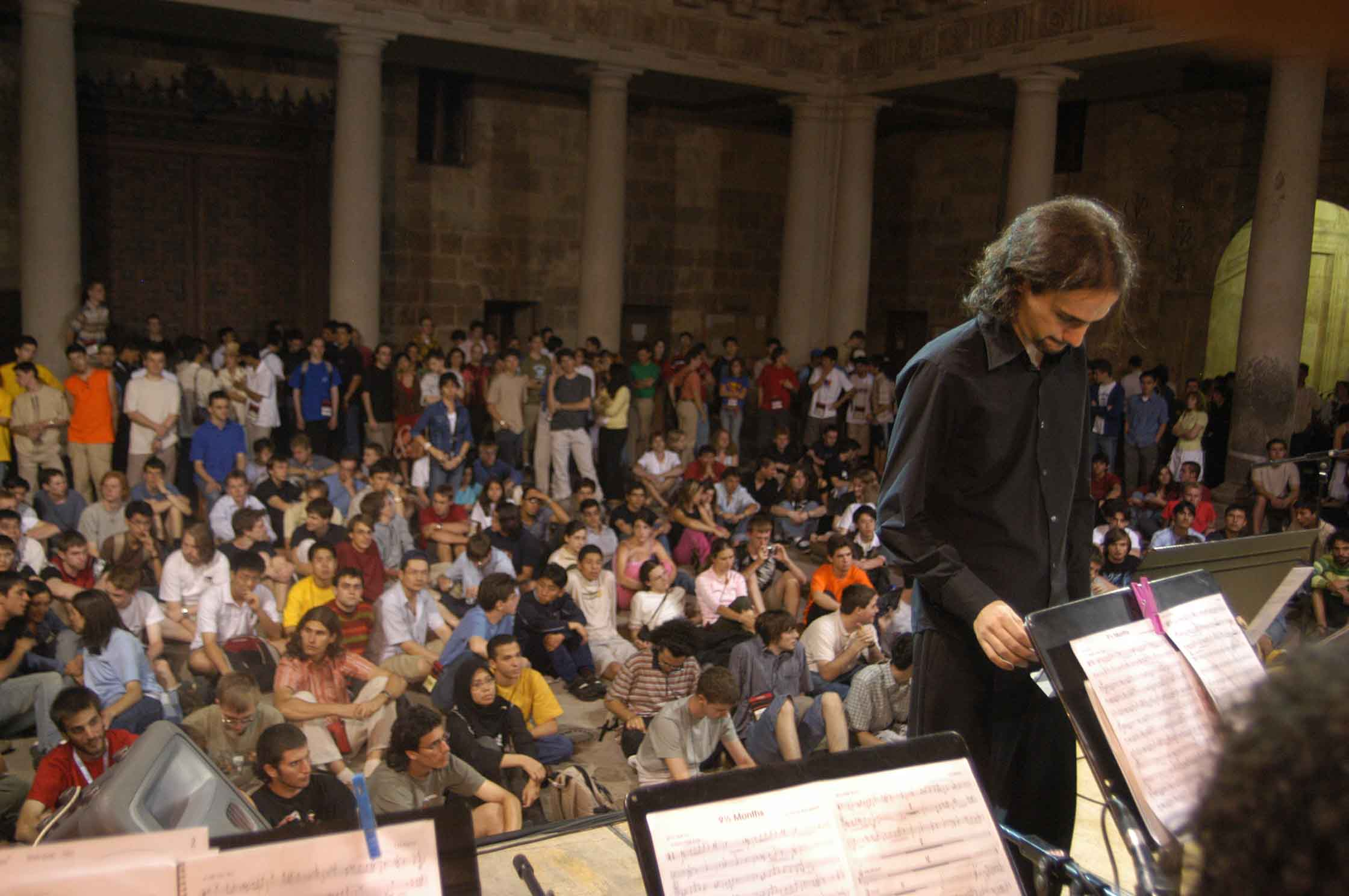
Alberto Carmona in Palacwe, 2005.

Alberto Porro Carmona (born 17 October 1980) is a Spanish conductor, composer, author, lecturer, teacher and saxophonist.

He has led many big bands, both in Europe and America, and has won many awards for his music and banditry. He has played concerts around the world including Spain, France, Belgium, Portugal, Italy, Germany, Iceland, United Kingdom, Argentina, Chile, Brazil, Paraguay and Cuba.

Carmona works as a music director and teaches at the Akureyri Music School. He also teaches at the University of Akureyri.
