= In Touch (album) =

Studio album by Phalanx
- Released: 1988
- Recorded: February 27 and 29, 1988
- Studio: A & R Recording, New York City
- Genre: Jazz
- Length: 53:04
- Label: DIW; DIW-8026
- Producer: Kazunori Sugiyama

Phalanx chronology
Original Phalanx (1987)	In Touch (1988)	Phalanx Live (2013)

James Blood Ulmer chronology
Music Revelation Ensemble (1988)	In Touch (1988)	Blues Allnight (1989)

George Adams chronology
Song Everlasting (1987)	In Touch (1988)	Nightingale (1989)

In Touch is an album by James Blood Ulmer and George Adams' band Phalanx which was recorded in 1988 and released on the Japanese DIW label.

== Reception ==
Professional ratings
Review scores
Source	Rating
Allmusic	4/5 stars

The Allmusic review by Scott Yanow stated, "The performances dispense quickly with the opening themes except as abstract reminders of the original moods and emphasize both solo and group improvisations. Adams has his ferocious moments and Ulmer makes the ensembles quite crowded and intense (he also plays some flute during a couple of the melody statements) while bassist Sirone and drummer Ali keep the group interactions quite stimulating. After a slow start, the fiery sounds result in some memorable music".

== Track listing ==
All compositions by James Blood Ulmer except where noted

1. "Keeping Still" (George Adams) – 7:20
2. "Line In Line Out" – 9:00
3. "Illusion of Reality" (Sirone) – 11:05
4. "Spanish Endeavors" (Adams) – 6:55
5. "Look and See" – 7:00
6. "Involution Evolution" (Sirone) – 11:35

== Personnel ==
- George Adams - tenor saxophone, soprano saxophone, flute
- James Blood Ulmer - guitar, flute
- Sirone - bass
- Rashied Ali - drums
