= Black and Blues =

Studio album by James Blood Ulmer
- Released: 1991
- Recorded: October 24, 25, November 6 and 7, 1990
- Studio: Power Station, New York City
- Genre: Jazz
- Length: 51:01
- Label: DIW; 845
- Producer: Kazunori Sugiyama & James Blood Ulmer

James Blood Ulmer chronology
Blues Allnight (1989)	Black and Blues (1991)	After Dark (1992)

Black and Blues is an album by American guitarist James Blood Ulmer recorded in 1990 and released on the Japanese DIW label.

== Reception ==
The Allmusic review awarded the album 3 stars.

Professional ratings
Review scores
Source	Rating
Allmusic	3/5 stars

== Track listing ==
All compositions by James Blood Ulmer

1. "Burning Like Love" - 5:54
2. "Crying" - 6:12
3. "Lady of Colours" - 5:38
4. "Tower of Power" - 3:54
5. "New York Day" - 6:32
6. "Make It Right" - 5:39
7. "Sign Language" - 6:30
8. "No Other Lover" - 4:40
9. "Uptown" - 6:02
- Recorded at the Power Station, New York on October 24, 25, November 6 and 7, 1990

== Personnel ==
- James Blood Ulmer - electric guitar, vocals
- Amin Ali - bass guitar
- Ronnie Drayton - guitar (1, 2, 4 & 6)
- G. Calvin Weston - drums
