= Cosimo Di Ceglie =

Italian jazz guitarist

Cosimo Di Ceglie (October 21, 1913, in Andria – 1980 in Milan) was an Italian jazz guitarist.

Di Ceglie played with local bands in Andria before joining Herb Flemming's group in the mid-1930s. He recorded with Piero Rizza and the Orchestra del Circolo Jazz Hot di Milano, as well as under his own name, in the period 1936–1938, then worked with Enzo Ceragioli and Gorni Kramer around 1940. He was active during World War II on radio, playing with a six-piece ensemble, and made further recordings under his own name in the late 1940s and in the 1950s. He also played with Adriano Celentano, Kai Hyttinen, and others later in his career.
