= Yasek Manzano Silva =

Yasek Manzano Silva (born December 10, 1980 in Havana) is a Cuban trumpet player and composer in Marianao. He has performed with Celia Cruz, Los Van Van, Irakere, Bobby Carcassés and the British bands Manic Street Preachers and Simply Red.

== Biography ==
Silva began studying music at the Alejandro Garcia Caturla Conservatory in Marianao and reproduced the music he heard on his parents' LPs. In 1995, Manzano entered the Amadeo Roldán Conservatory in Havana, where he became interested in jazz music. He later attended the Havana School of Arts and Music.

In 1995, Manzano began to perform regularly at La Zorra Y El Cuervo, a club in Havana. In 1997, Roy Hargrove, an American jazz trumpeter gave him his first trumpet and Silva started to play in various jam sessions in the city. Later, he traveled to New York and was offered a scholarship at the Juilliard School of Music, where he studied under jazz trumpet player Wynton Marsalis and played in the Juilliard Jazz Orchestra.

Back in Cuba in 2003, Manzano started his professional career by forming his own group and recording his first album in collaboration with Roberto Martínez. In recent years he has performed with many notable Cuban musicians, including Chucho Valdés, Joaquín Betancourt, Frank Fernández, Beatriz Márquez, Marta Campos, Emilio Morales, Amauri Pérez, Roberto Julio Carcassés, Tony Martínez, Soraima Pérez (Sory), con el grupo de rock Tesis de Menta, entre otros.

Manzano often has been invited abroad to countries like the United States, Brazil, Canada, Colombia, France, United Kingdom, South Africa, Switzerland, Italy, and Barbados to record, teach or perform. He also is a member of the del Consejo Nacional de la Union de Escritores y Artistas de Cuba (UNEAC).

== Performances and releases ==
- 2015: Electronic Jazz concerts, Santa Clara, Cuba (multiple cities).
- 2015: Performed at the Symphony Space, with Cuban musicians including Alexis Bosh (piano) and Juan Antomarchi “Coto” (tres)
- 2015: Performed with Dayme Arizona and Zule Guerra in the Cuban Hispano-American Center, Havana, Cuba.
- 2014: Barranquilla jazz festival, Barranquilla, Colombia.
- 2014: Releases “Blues para la Luna” along with the quartet “Magic Sax”, Santiago de Cuba, Cuba
- 2013: International Festival Jazz (special guest of Arturo O’Farrell and his Latin Jazz band), Havana, Cuba.
- 2012: Judged Cuba Disco 2012, Havana, Cuba
- 2011: Conducted master classes at Stanford University, Menlo Park, California, USA
- 2011: Produced and performed on Yanet Valdes recording.
- 2010: Performed with Wynton Marsalis and Jazz at Lincoln Center, Havana, Cuba
- 2009: Festival Eutopia (with his band, Cordoba, Spain
- 2009: Jazz Festival, Oslo, Norway
- 2009: Performed and conducted master classes in Salvador de Bahia, Brazil
- 2008: Conducted music workshops in Halifax, Nova Scotia
- 2008: Conducted music workshops in Halifax, Nova Scotia
- 2007: Barbados Jazz Festival, Bridgetown, Barbados
- 2006: Festival Cuerda Viva, Havana, Cuba
- 2006: Festival Cuerda Viva, Havana, Cuba
- 2005: Performances with the Camagüey Symphony orchestra; Performances with the Santa Clara Symphony orchestra; Concert for the victims of Hurricane Katrina, New Orleans, USA; Festival Jazz Plaza, Havana, Cuba
- 2004: Festival Jazz Plaza, with his formation, Havana, Cuba; Performances with the Santiago de Cuba Symphony orchestra
- 2003: Jojazz: El Joven Jazz Cubano, first album with Roberto Martinez under the label EGREM
- 2000: Festival Jazz Plaza, with “Bellita y Jazztumbata”, Havana, Cuba
- 1999: 20th Django Reinhardt Jazz Festival, France
- 1995: Festival Jazz Plaza, with Bobby Carcassés formation, Havana, Cuba
- 1993: Festival Jazz Plaza, with Bobby Carcassés formation, Havana, Cuba

== Awards ==
- 2010: winner of the "Premio Cubadisco 2010" for the album Amnio 1407
- 1998: winner of the JoJazz contest, Havana, Cuba
