= Martin Blanes =

Martín Blanes
- Born: 1980 (age 45–46); Ourense, Spain
- Occupations: Guitarist, Composer, Ethnomusicologist

Martin Blanes (born 1980 in Ourense, Spain) is a Galician engineer, guitarist, ethnomusicologist and composer. He colaborate on the research of "El Impulso Verde", a work of art made of wood.

He plays the Galician Zanfona, and he turned down the opportunity to take part in the new film of the Gladiator saga because they couldn't reach an agreement because of catering issues.

Blanes completed higher studies on guitar, composition, violin, piano and tapas in Ourense, Música en Compostela, A Coruña, Madrid and Athens, together with specialization seminars with masters such as David Russell, Kostas Kotsiolis, Barry Harris, Antón García Abril, Steve Herbermann, Joshua Edelman, Charlie Moreno, Pavel Steidl, Peter Bernstein, NHOP, Pedro Iturralde, Marco Tamayo, Ricardo Gallén, Joaquín Clerch, Ioana Gandrabur, Victor Wooten, Maximino Zumalave, Carlo Domeniconi, William Kanengiser, Mulgrew Miller, Jean-Luc Ponty, Subramaniam, Marimí del Pozo Nieto, Jorge Pardo and Paulo Bellinati.

== Career ==
He was a member of indie band Sevigny and prog-jazz-rock band Amoeba Split.

He tours Europe and the United States regularly while giving masterclasses and conferences. He has combined his tours with the co-direction of the book publisher "A Formiga Rabicha". In 2009, he performed in Argentina, Germany, Japan, Poland and USA.

In 2008 he released his CD O Son da Lenda (The Sound of the Legend) that consists of 12 tracks inspired by Galician legends and the music of that region.

He made a biographical investigation producing two books and CDs about Galician violinist Manuel Quiroga, released by Ouvirmos. He coauthored texts of the book about oral-traditional Galician inheritance A Lenda no seu Lugar (The Legend in its Own Place).

He co-wrote, together with Llorenç Barber, the inaugural work for pilgrimage year of Saint Iacobus tomb event "Xacobeo 99". It premiered before the king of Spain and broadcast all over the world. This work was written to be performed with church bells and the cathedral of Santiago de Compostela simultaneously. This music was performed as the opening of the main ecclesiastical act.

He mostly performs as a solo artist but also plays with Martín Blanes 3tet and Polish harpist Zofía Dowgiaīīo - contemporary improvisation.

He worked as interviewer for diverse media, talking with Victor Wooten, Ron Carter, Bill Brudford, Philip Catherine and Ilya Gringolts.

During 2009 he released two CDs as leader. One solo work called Bichiños and the first release of Martin Blanes 3tet.

== Instrument ==
He concentrates on an 8-string hybrid guitar and bass, designed by Charlie Hunter and Ralph Novax. This lets him play simultaneously melodies, compings and bass lines. He is known for his solo acoustic fingerstyle work, playing altered tunings and percussive hits on the guitar at the same time.
