= Federico Casagrande =

Italian jazz guitarist

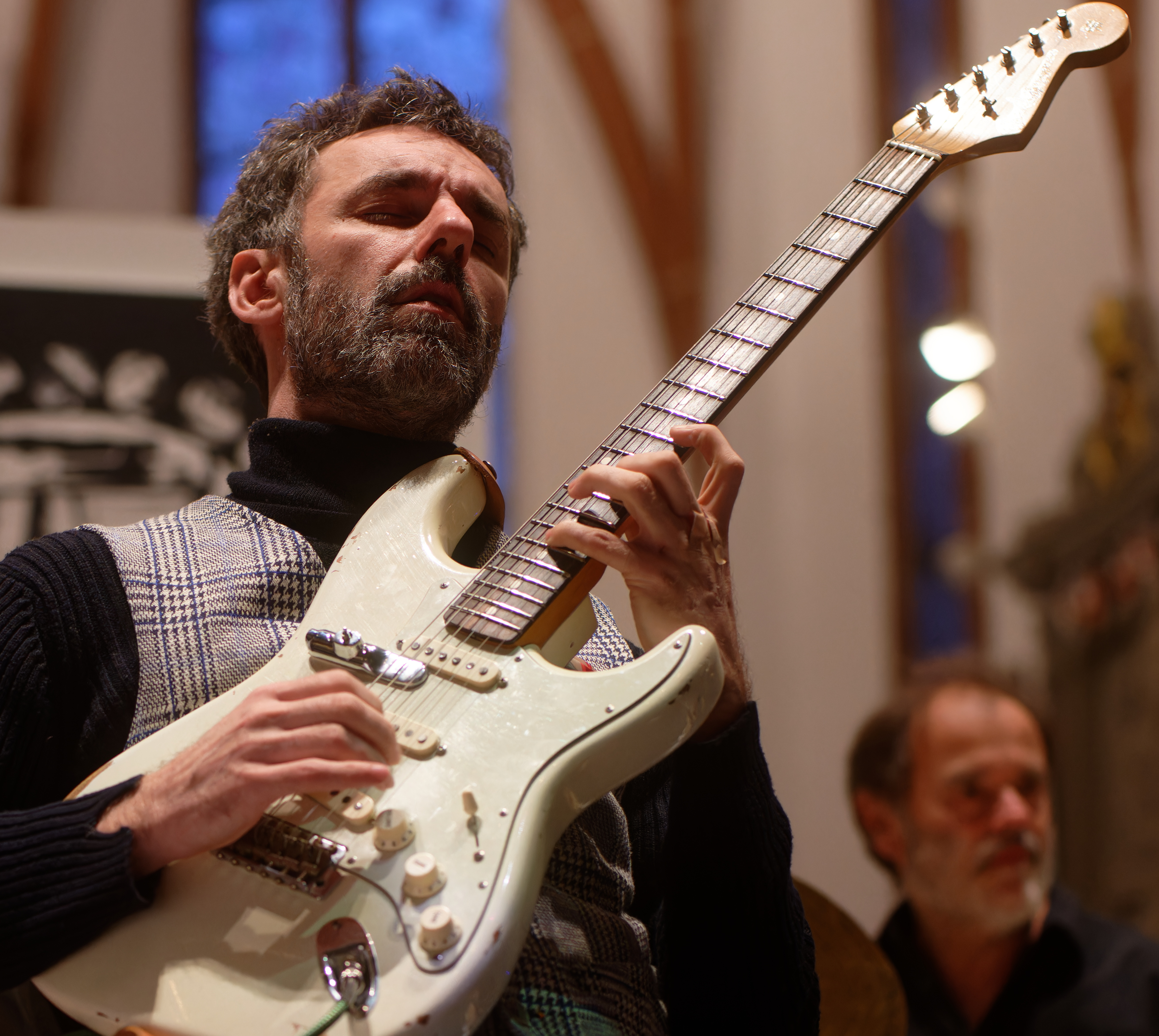
Federico Casagrande

Federico Casagrande (born 27 February 1980 in Treviso, Veneto, Italy) is an Italian jazz guitarist.

== Career ==
Casagrande graduated from the Berklee College of Music in 2006. In 2007 he won first prize in the Montreux Jazz Festival guitar competition. He has released at least ten albums as leader or co-leader and has been described by The Irish Times as a "rising star of the younger generation [of European jazz musicians]"

== Discography ==
- Conversations with Fulvio Sigurta (Impossible Ark, 2009)
- Hypercube with Marco Bucelli (2011)
- The Ancient Battle of the Invisible (CAM Jazz, 2012)
- At the End of the Day (CAM Jazz, 2015)
- Double Circle with Enrico Pieranunzi (CAM Jazz, 2015)
- Fast Forward (CAM Jazz, 2017)
- Lost Songs with Francesco Bearzatti (CAM Jazz, 2018)
