= No Wave (album) =

Studio album by Music Revelation Ensemble
- Released: 1980
- Recorded: June 1980
- Studio: Studio 57, Düsseldorf, West Germany
- Genre: Avant-garde jazz
- Length: 36:27
- Label: Moers Music momu 01072
- Producer: Burkhard Hennen

Music Revelation Ensemble chronology
No Wave (1980)	Music Revelation Ensemble (1988)

James Blood Ulmer chronology
Are You Glad to Be in America? (1980)	No Wave (1980)	Free Lancing (1981)

No Wave is the debut album by James Blood Ulmer's Music Revelation Ensemble, featuring saxophonist David Murray, bassist Amin Ali and drummer Ronald Shannon Jackson, recorded in 1980 and released on the German Moers Music label.

== Critical reception ==
Professional ratings
Review scores
Source	Rating
AllMusic	3/5 stars
Robert Christgau	B+

The New York Times called the album "more a free-form jam session than a program of tightly arranged compositions and is the least successful of the guitarist's recordings." Trouser Press deemed it "Ulmer's most inaccessible work and his least focused." Robert Christgau noted that, "when David Murray starts to blow on the one they call 'Baby Talk', and not even over one of Jackson-Ali's funkier beats, it's fun, and a revelation."

== Track listing ==
All compositions by James Blood Ulmer

1. "Time Table" – 10:00
2. "Big Tree" – 8:45
3. "Baby Talk" – 9:36
4. "Sound Check" – 8:06

== Personnel ==
- James Blood Ulmer – guitar
- David Murray – tenor saxophone
- Amin Ali – electric bass
- Ronald Shannon Jackson – drums, percussion
