= Blues Allnight =

Studio album by James Blood Ulmer
- Released: 1989
- Recorded: May 1989
- Studio: Calren Studios, West Germany
- Genre: Jazz
- Length: 37:20
- Label: In+Out; IOR 7005
- Producer: Frank Kleinschmidt, James Blood Ulmer

James Blood Ulmer chronology
In Touch (1988)	Blues Allnight (1989)	Elec. Jazz (1990)

Blues Allnight is an album by American guitarist James Blood Ulmer recorded in 1989 and released on the In + Out label.

== Reception ==
Allmusic awarded the album 3 stars.

Professional ratings
Review scores
Source	Rating
Allmusic	3/5 stars

== Track listing ==
All compositions by James Blood Ulmer

1. "Blues Allnight" – 5:09
2. "Calling Marry" – 5:33
3. "Peace and Happiness" – 4:08
4. "She Ain't So Cold" – 4:19
5. "Changing Times" – 4:08
6. "Baby Snatcher" – 4:32
7. "Boss Machine" – 4:09
8. "I Don't Know Why" – 5:22

== Personnel ==
- James Blood Ulmer – guitar, vocals
- Winnie Leyh – keyboards, backing vocals
- Amin Ali – bass, backing vocals
- Ronnie Drayton – guitar, backing vocals
- Grant Calvin Weston – drums, backing vocals
