= Live at the Caravan of Dreams =

Live album by James Blood Ulmer
- Released: 1986
- Recorded: 1985
- Genre: Jazz
- Label: Caravan of Dreams Productions
- Producer: Kathelin Hoffman

James Blood Ulmer chronology
Part Time (1984)	Live at the Caravan of Dreams (1986)	America - Do You Remember the Love? (1987)

Live at the Caravan of Dreams is a live album by American guitarist James Blood Ulmer, recorded in 1985 at the Caravan of Dreams in Fort Worth, Texas, and released on the Caravan of Dreams label. It was Ulmer's only album recorded for the label.

== Reception ==
Professional ratings
Review scores
Source	Rating
AllMusic	4/5 stars
Robert Christgau	B+

The AllMusic review by Thom Jurek states, "Precision and dynamic create the drama on this set and, as it moves from one jam into another, a state of deep black and blue grace is achieved, making this a seductive, smoky, from the depths kind of record. This one is overlooked by critics but the reason why is baffling".

== Track listing ==
All compositions by James Blood Ulmer

1. " Are You Glad to Be in America? 4:28
2. "The Little Red House" – 4:34
3. "Cheering" – 4:43
4. "Recess" – 5:59
5. "Revealing" – 3:26
6. "Lonely Man" – 4:32
7. "Church" – 5:37
8. "I Need Love" – 4:06

- Recorded at the Caravan of Dreams, Fort Worth, Texas, in 1985

== Personnel ==
- James Blood Ulmer – guitar, vocals
- Charles Burnham – violin
- Amin Ali – bass
- Warren Benbow – drums
