= George Adams (musician) =

American jazz multi-instrumentalist (1940–1992)

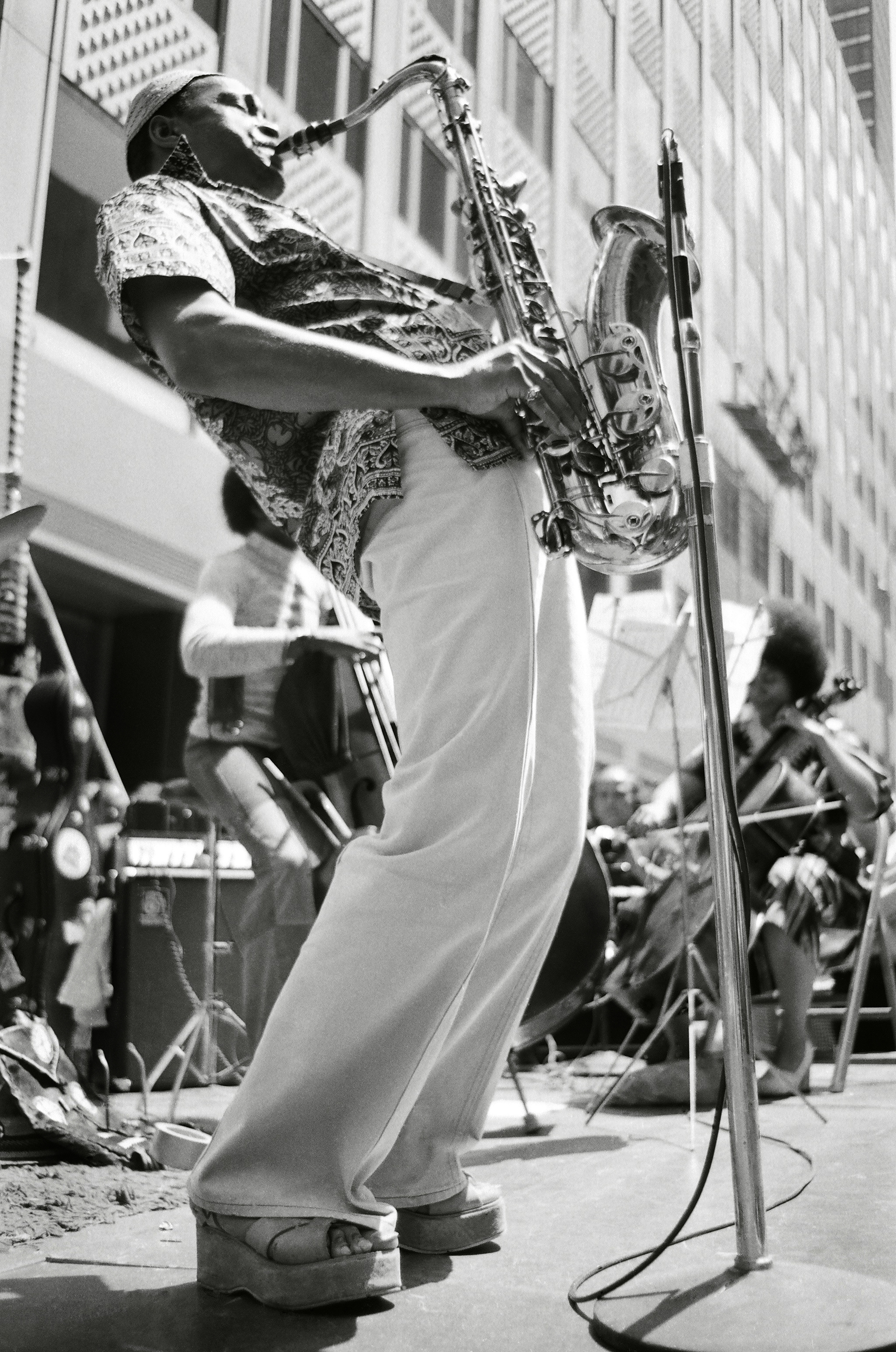
- Adams performing on July 6, 1976, in New York City

Background information
- Born: George Rufus Adams; April 29, 1940; Covington, Georgia, United States
- Died: November 14, 1992 (aged 52) New York City, United States
- Genres: Jazz, hard bop, post-bop, avant-garde jazz
- Occupations: Musician, composer
- Instruments: Tenor saxophone, flute, bass clarinet
- Labels: Blue Note, Atlantic, Timeless, Soul Note, Palcoscenico, Horo, ECM

George Rufus Adams (April 29, 1940 – November 14, 1992) was an American jazz musician who played tenor saxophone, flute and bass clarinet. He is best known for his work with Charles Mingus, Gil Evans, Roy Haynes and in the quartet he co-led with pianist Don Pullen, featuring bassist Cameron Brown and drummer Dannie Richmond. He was also known for his idiosyncratic singing.

== Biography ==
George Adams was born in Covington, Georgia, on April 29, 1940. He first started playing piano at the age of eleven and switched to tenor saxophone in high school. Later on, he went study at the Clark College and got lessons on flute by Wayman Carver. As a teenager, George Adams frequently gained performance experience by playing with local R&B bands. In 1961, he accompanied singer Sam Cooke on a tour. At this point, Adams was based out of Cleveland where he spent a great deal of time studying and working with organ trios alongside pianist and organist, Bill Doggett. The two men played a form of music that combined rhythm and blues with jazz. In 1968, he decided to expand his career and move to New York City to participate in the city's growing jazz scene. A year later, George Adams toured with Roy Haynes, playing with him until 1973. Shortly after, he performed with Art Blakey, before joining Charles Mingus' band. His partnership with Mingus lasted until 1976.

== Mingus (1973–76) ==
George Adams' first appearance with Mingus was on Mingus Moves with Ronald Hampton, Dannie Richmond, and Don Pullen in 1973. Later on, Adams went to perform in Mingus at Carnegie Hall, Changes One and Changes Two. He also appeared on Mingus Moves (1973) and other albums. 1975, while touring Europe with Mingus, he made his first recordings under his own name with Don Pullen, Dannie Richmond and bassist David Williams. Adams also began a working relationship with Gil Evans that lasted until 1978 that same year.

== Gil Evans (1975–78) ==
Adams' first appearance with Evans was on his album The Gil Evans Orchestra Plays the Music of Jimi Hendrix, which was dedicated to the compositional efforts of rock guitarist Jimi Hendrix. The album features orchestral versions of songs such as Angel, Castles Made of Sand and Voodoo Child. George Adams continued to record with Gil Evans throughout 1975 by contributing to his album There Comes a Time.

== McCoy Tyner ==
In 1976, Adams began to performing on and off with pianist McCoy Tyner until the late 1980s. The following year, George performed with trumpeter Marvin Hannibal Peterson at the Antibes Jazz Festival in Antibes, France. He appeared on Tyner's album The Greeting in 1978, alongside bassist Charles Fambrough and drummer Sonship.

== George Adams/Don Pullen Quartet (1979–92) ==
In 1979, Adams and Pullen began to co-lead a quartet with Dannie Richmond and bassist Cameron Brown. In December 1979, George recorded the album Paradise Space Shuttle with his personal quintet that featured pianist Ron Burton, drummer Al Foster, bassist Don Pate and percussionist Azzedin Weston.

Adams' contributions to his ensemble were best heard on Paradise Space Shuttle's title track. After a brief introduction, he enters the arrangement playing a disjointed and primal melody. He then plays a more traditional bebop figure before supplementing it with a strident motif. He continues to utilize several different textures throughout the song, such as multiphonics, blues riffs and phrased melodic devices. The result of all this is a performance that includes a multitude of saxophone history into four and a half minutes.

In 1980, Adams and Dannie Richmond recorded the album Hand to Hand for the Soul Note label. The album featured trombonist Jimmy Knepper, pianist Hugh Lawson and bassist Mike Richmond. In August 1980, Adams and Pullen recorded the album Earth Beams. The ensemble demonstrated its best on the album's title track. Adams' immediate performance provides a great deal of melodic presence throughout the song. George's deep resonance helps to thicken the harmonic quality of the song. The fundamentals of the ensemble are also anchored perfectly by Dannie Richmond.

In 1983, Adams started to expand on his career as a sideman by recording with trombonist Craig Harris on his album Black Bone. The following year, George recorded as a member of the Mingus Dynasty at the Village Vanguard. In April 1985, Adams and Pullen recorded the album Live at Montmartre, but it wasn't released until 2000, and featured a guest appearance by guitarist John Scofield. The group is quite noteworthy on the song Well, I Guess We'll Never Know.

After a brief introduction from Richmond, the ensemble goes into a variation of Rhythm Changes with a different take on the bridge. The unison line of Adams and Scofield gives the overall melodic stance of the song more body and power. During his solo, Adams shadows Pullen's "sheets of sound" solo by performing with the same bravado and style. The addition of Scofield adds more of a foundation for George to work off of with the outcome being an even more confident melodic statement.

The following year, Adams and Hannibal Peterson recorded the album More Sightings for the Enja label. In 1987, George recorded the album Where Were You? with the group Orange Then Blue. It featured trumpeter Ken Cervenka, trombonist Peter Cirelli and French horn player Gunther Schuller, amongst others. He then became a member of the band Phalanx that same year, alongside drummer Rashied Ali, bassist Sirone and guitarist James Blood Ulmer and released the album, Original Phalanx.

In 1988, Richmond died and the Adams/Pullen group briefly replaced him with drummer Lewis Nash, then disbanded. Adams then formed a new quartet with Cameron Brown, Hugh Lawson and drummer Gregory Hutchinson. The same year, George recorded an album of ballads and spirituals entitled Nightingale, alongside Lawson, Sirone and drummer Victor Lewis. The album features renditions of "What a Wonderful World", "Moon River", and "Ol' Man River." 1988 also saw the release of the Phalanx album, In Touch.

He died in New York at the age of 52 after an illness. He had been experiencing breathing difficulties for the last year.

== Playing style ==
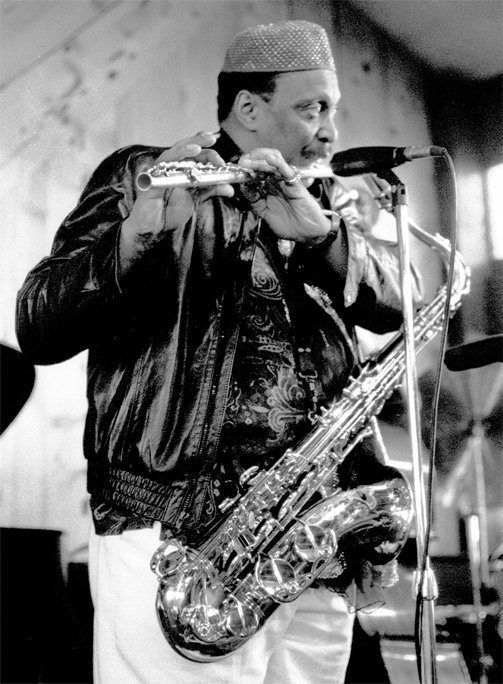
George Adams in Half Moon Bay, California, with the George Adams-Don Pullen Quartet, including Cameron Brown and Dannie Richmond, 3/13/88

Adams and Don Pullen shared a musical vision and their quartet straddled the range from R&B to the avant-garde. (The quartet was sometimes known as the "George Adams–Don Pullen Quartet", and sometimes as the "Don Pullen–George Adams Quartet".) After Adams' death, Pullen dedicated to his memory the 1993 CD Ode To Life, recorded by his African-Brazilian Connection, and in particular the ballad "Ah George, We Hardly Knew Ya".

One of Adams' last recordings was America on the Blue Note label. This album consists of classic American songs like "Tennessee Waltz", "You Are My Sunshine" and "Take Me Out to the Ballgame" as well as a few original songs that articulate Adams' positive view of his country and the gifts it had given him. It also includes "The Star-Spangled Banner" and "America the Beautiful".

Adams was a member of the band that played Epitaph by Charles Mingus.

== Discography ==
=== As leader ===
- Jazz a Confronto 22 (Horo, 1975)
- Suite for Swingers (Horo, 1976)
- Paradise Space Shuttle (Timeless Muse, 1979)
- Sound Suggestions (ECM, 1979)
- Hand to Hand – with Dannie Richmond (Soul Note, 1980)
- Melodic Excursions – with Don Pullen (Timeless, 1982)
- Gentlemen's Agreement – with Dannie Richmond (Soul Note, 1983)
- More Sightings – with Hannibal Peterson (Enja, 1984)
- Nightingale (Blue Note, 1989)
- America (Blue Note, 1989)
- Old Feeling (Something Else, 1991)

=== As the George Adams-Don Pullen Quartet ===
- All That Funk (Palcoscenico, 1979)
- More Funk (Palcoscenico, 1979)
- Don't Lose Control (Soul Note, 1979)
- Earth Beams (Timeless, 1981)
- Life Line (Timeless, 1981)
- City Gates (Timeless, 1983)
- Live at the Village Vanguard (Soul Note, 1983)
- Live at the Village Vanguard Vol. 2 (Soul Note, 1983)
- Decisions (Timeless, 1984)
- Live at Montmartre – with John Scofield (Timeless, 1985)
- Breakthrough (Blue Note, 1986)
- Song Everlasting (Blue Note, 1987)

With Phalanx

- 1986 Got Something Good for You (Moers Music)
- 1987 Original Phalanx (DIW)
- 1988 In Touch (DIW)

=== As sideman ===
With Gil Evans

- There Comes a Time (RCA, 1975)
- Priestess (Antilles, 1977)
- Gil Evans Live at the Royal Festival Hall London 1978 (RCA, 1979)
- 1981 Lunar Eclypse (live in Europe 1981)
- Live at Sweet Basil (Gramavision, 1984 [1986])
- Live at Sweet Basil Vol. 2 (Gramavision, 1984 [1987])
- 1987 Live at Umbria Jazz: Volume 1 and 2

With Craig Harris

- Black Bone (Soul Note, 1983)
- 4 Play (JMT, 1991)

With Roy Haynes

- Hip Ensemble (Mainstream, 1971)
- Senyah (Mainstream, 1972)

With Cecil McBee

- Mutima (Strata-East, 1974)

With Charles Mingus

- Mingus Moves (Atlantic, 1973)
- Mingus at Carnegie Hall (Atlantic, 1974)
- Changes One (Atlantic, 1974)
- Changes Two (Atlantic, 1974)

With New York Unit

- Oleo (CBS/Sony, 1989)
- Blue Bossa (Paddle Wheel, 1990)
- Tribute to George Adams (Paddle Wheel, 1991)

With Don Pullen

- Jazz a Confronto 21 (Horo, 1975)
- Tomorrow's Promises (Atlantic, 1977)

With James Blood Ulmer

- Revealing (In + Out, 1977)

With McCoy Tyner

- The Greeting (Milestone, 1978)
- Horizon (Milestone, 1979)
- Things Ain't What They Used to Be (Blue Note, 1989)

With Ravi Shankar

- Jazzmine (Polydor, 1980)
