= James Blood Ulmer =

American jazz and blues guitarist and singer (1940–2026)

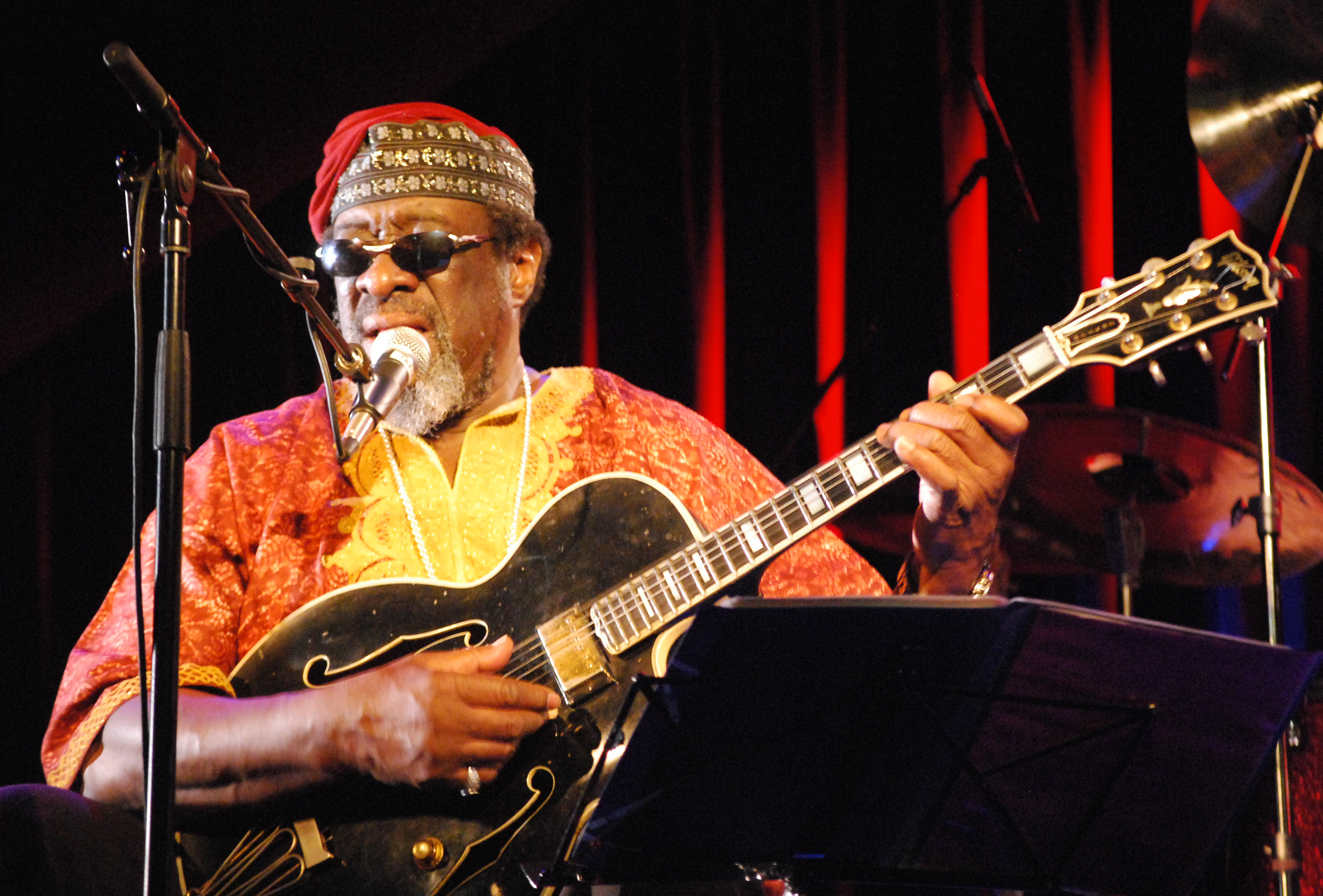
- Ulmer performing in 2011

Background information
- Also known as: Damu Mustafa Abdul Musawwir
- Born: Willie James Ulmer; February 8, 1940; St. Matthews, South Carolina, U.S.
- Died: June 3, 2026 (aged 86) New York City, U.S.
- Genres: Jazz; harmolodics; free funk; electric blues; avant-funk
- Instruments: Guitar; vocals

Willie James "Blood" Ulmer (February 8, 1940 – June 3, 2026) was an American jazz, free funk and blues guitarist and singer. He played a Gibson Byrdland guitar. His guitar sound has been described as "jagged" and "stinging". An article by journalists Peter Margasak and Graham Flashner called Ulmer's singing "raggedly soulful".

== Life and career ==
Willie James Ulmer was born in St. Matthews, South Carolina, United States on February 8, 1940. He began his career playing with soul jazz ensembles, first in Pittsburgh, Pennsylvania, from 1959 to 1964, and then in the Columbus, Ohio, area from 1964 to 1967. He recorded with organist Hank Marr in 1964 (released 1967). After moving to New York in 1971, Ulmer played with Art Blakey's Jazz Messengers, Joe Henderson, Paul Bley, Rashied Ali, and Larry Young.

In the early 1970s, Ulmer joined Ornette Coleman; he was the first electric guitarist to record and tour extensively with Coleman. He has credited Coleman as a major influence. Coleman's reliance on electric guitar in his fusion-oriented recordings owes a debt to Ulmer.

His appearance on Arthur Blythe's two consecutive Columbia albums, Lenox Avenue Breakdown (1979) and Illusions (1980), was followed by Ulmer's signing to that label. That resulted in three albums: Free Lancing, Black Rock, and Odyssey, which was the inaugural release of Odyssey The Band with drummer Warren Benbow and violinist Charles Burnham. The trio was called "avant-gutbucket" by music critic Bill Milkowski to describe the music as "conjuring images of Skip James and Albert Ayler jamming on the Mississippi Delta."

Ulmer formed Music Revelation Ensemble around 1980, co-led with David Murray for the first decade and lasting into the 1990s. Later versions of the band included Arthur Blythe, Sam Rivers, Pharoah Sanders, and John Zorn. In the 1980s he co-led the quartet Phalanx with saxophonist George Adams. Ulmer has recorded as a leader, including blues-oriented albums produced by Vernon Reid: Memphis Blood, No Escape from the Blues, Bad Blood in the City, and Birthright.

He was a judge for the 8th annual Independent Music Awards to support independent musicians.

In a 2005 DownBeat interview, he said guitar technique stagnated after the death of Jimi Hendrix. He stated technique could advance "if the guitar would stop following the piano" and indicated he tunes his guitar strings to A.

In 2009, Ulmer started the label American Revelation. In spring 2011, he joined James Carter's organ trio as a special guest with Nicholas Payton on trumpet for a six-night stand of performances at Blue Note New York.

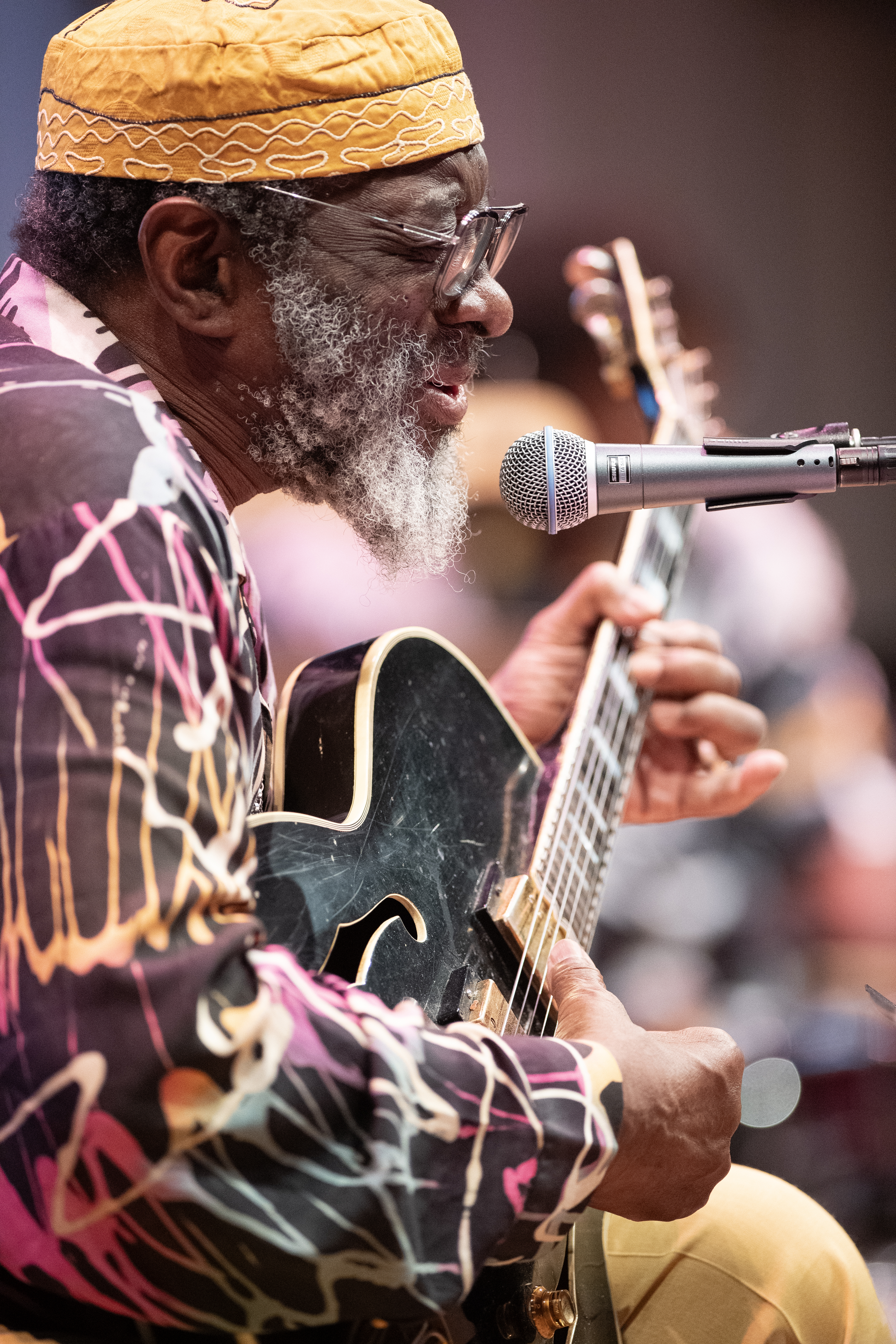
James Blood Ulmer, Arts for Art - Vision Festival 2024. Photo by Marek Lazarski

Ulmer died in Manhattan on June 3, 2026, at the age of 86.

== Discography ==
=== As leader ===
- Tales of Captain Black (Artists House, 1979)
- Are You Glad to Be in America? (Rough Trade, 1980)
- Free Lancing (Columbia, 1981)
- Black Rock (CBS, 1982)
- Odyssey (CBS, 1983)
- Part Time (Rough Trade, 1984)
- Live at the Caravan of Dreams (Caravan of Dreams, 1986)
- America – Do You Remember the Love? (Blue Note, 1987)
- Blues Allnight (Bellaphon, 1990)
- Revealing (In+Out, 1990)
- Black and Blues (DIW, 1991)
- Blues Preacher (DIW, 1993)
- Live at the Bayerischer Hof (In+Out, 1994)
- Music Speaks Louder than Words (DIW, 1995)
- Plays the Music of Ornette Coleman (DIW, 1996)
- Harmolodic Guitar with Strings (DIW, 1997)
- Reunion (Knitting Factory, 1997)
- Forbidden Blues (DIW, 1998)
- Memphis Blood: The Sun Sessions (Label M, 2001)
- Blue Blood (Innerhythmic, 2001)
- No Escape from the Blues: The Electric Lady Sessions (Hyena, 2003)
- Guitar Music (Dernière Bande, 2003) – with Rodolphe Burger
- Back in Time (Pi, 2005)
- Birthright (Hyena, 2005)
- Bad Blood in the City: The Piety Street Sessions (Hyena, 2007)
- In and Out (In+Out, 2009)
- Black Rock Reunion (American Revelation, 2009)
- Blues Odyssey (American Revelation, 2010)
- Live at Birdland (American Revelation, 2010)
- Freelancing Live (American Revelation, 2013)

With Music Revelation Ensemble

- No Wave (Moers, 1980)
- Music Revelation Ensemble (DIW, 1988)
- Elec. Jazz (DIW, 1990)
- After Dark (DIW, 1992)
- In the Name of... (DIW, 1994)
- Knights of Power (DIW, 1996)
- Cross Fire (DIW, 1997)

With Phalanx

- Got Something Good for You (Moers Music, 1986)
- Original Phalanx (DIW, 1987)
- In Touch (DIW, 1988)
- Phalanx Live (American Revelation, 2013)

With Third Rail

- South Delta Space Age (Antilles, 1995)

=== As sideman ===
- Rashied Ali, Rashied Ali Quintet (Survival, 1973)
- Karl Berger, Conversations (In+Out, 1994)
- Arthur Blythe, Lenox Avenue Breakdown (Columbia, 1979)
- Arthur Blythe, Illusions (Columbia, 1980)
- James Carter, Out of Nowhere (Half Note, 2005)
- Ornette Coleman, Celebrate Ornette (Song X 2016)
- Ry Cooder, The End of Violence (Outpost, 1997)
- Jayne Cortez, Borders of Disorderly Time (Bola, 2003)
- Joe Henderson, Multiple (Milestone, 1973)
- Hank Marr, Sounds from the Marr-Ket Place (King, 1964)
- David Murray, Children (Black Saint, 1985)
- David Murray, Recording N.Y.C. 1986 (DIW, 1986)
- John Patton, Accent on the Blues (Blue Note, 1969)
- John Patton, Memphis to New York Spirit (Blue Note, 1996)
- Rochester/Veasley Band, One Minute of Love (Gramavision, 1985)
- The Roots, Phrenology (MCA, 2002)
- Juma Sultan, Whispers from the Archive (Porter, 2012)
- Jamaaladeen Tacuma, Show Stopper (Gramavision, 1983)
- World Saxophone Quartet, Political Blues (Justin Time, 2006)
- Frank Wright, Blues for Albert Ayler (ESP Disk, 2012)
- Larry Young, Lawrence of Newark (Perception, 1973)
