= Odyssey (James Blood Ulmer album) =

Studio album by James Blood Ulmer
- Released: 1983
- Recorded: March–May 1983
- Genre: Jazz
- Label: Columbia
- Producer: James Blood Ulmer

James Blood Ulmer chronology
Black Rock (1982)	Odyssey (1983)	Part Time (1984)

Odyssey is an album by American guitarist James Blood Ulmer, recorded and released in 1983 on the Columbia label. It was Ulmer's final of three albums recorded for a major label. The musicians on the album later re-united as the Odyssey Band and Odyssey the Band.

== Reception ==
The AllMusic review by Steve Huey stated that "Odyssey stands as James Blood Ulmer's signature masterpiece, the purest and most accessible showcase for his bold, genre-clashing guitar vision... All the pieces come together to produce not only Ulmer's finest album, but a certified classic of the modern jazz avant-garde." It placed at No. 20 in The Village Voice's annual Pazz & Jop critics' poll. The album was listed as part of a suggested "core collection" by The Penguin Guide to Jazz.

Professional ratings
Review scores
Source	Rating
AllMusic	5/5 stars
Christgau's Record Guide: The '80s	A
The Penguin Guide to Jazz	4/4 stars
The Rolling Stone Jazz Record Guide	5/5 stars

== Track listing ==
All compositions by James "Blood" Ulmer

1. "Church" – 4:54
2. "Little Red House" – 4:45
3. "Love Dance" – 5:05
4. "Are You Glad to Be in America?" – 3:40
5. "Election" – 3:26
6. "Odyssey" – 5:01
7. "Please Tell Her" – 4:10
8. "Swing & Things" – 4:32

- Recorded at the Power Station, New York, in March–May 1983

== Personnel ==
- James "Blood" Ulmer – guitar, vocals
- Charles Burnham – violin
- Warren Benbow – drums
