= Enzo Ceragioli =

Italian conductor, composer, arranger, and pianist

Enzo Ceragioli (October 1, 1908, Seravezza - June 10, 1999, Milan) was an Italian conductor, composer, arranger, and pianist. His versatility has been expressed in a wide variety of musical genres, from Jazz to Swing, Light music, Symphonic music, Operetta and Sacred music.

Prominent figure of jazz in Italy, Ceragioli recorded for Odeon Records the albums of the series "Italian jazzists" and the series "Ceragioli jazz pianist" and "Ceragioli famous jazz pianist".
