= Are You Glad to Be in America? =

Studio album by James Blood Ulmer
- Released: 1980
- Recorded: January 17, 1980
- Studio: RCA, New York City
- Genre: Jazz
- Label: Rough Trade (UK); Artists House (US)
- Producer: John Snyder, James "Blood" Ulmer

James Blood Ulmer chronology
| Tales of Captain Black (1978) | Are You Glad to Be in America? (1980) | No Wave (1980) |

DIW Records Cover

Are You Glad to Be in America? is an album by American guitarist James Blood Ulmer, recorded in 1980 and released on the Rough Trade label in the UK. It was mixed by Ulmer, Geoff Travis, Roger Trilling, and Mayo Thompson. A remixed version, credited to Ulmer and Bob Blank, with a different running order and new cover art, was released by the Artists House label in the US in 1981. The album was released on CD with a new third mix by Joe Ferla, but the original running order, and with a new cover design featuring a recent photo of Ulmer, on the Japanese DIW label in 1995.

== Critical reception ==
Professional ratings
Review scores
| Source | Rating |
|---|---|
| AllMusic | 4/5 stars |
| Robert Christgau | B+ |
| The Rolling Stone Jazz Record Guide | 4/5 stars |

The AllMusic review by Nathan Bush stated: "Shards of jazz, rock, funk, and surf guitar are shuffled together and unfurl in frenetic lines. At times the rhythms are too rigid and the results sound like an experiment from which the musicians are trying to break free. At best, the individuals lose themselves in a highly charged dialogue".

Trouser Press describes Are You Glad to Be in America? as an "exceptionally fine" album that "reveals a staggering understanding of the roots of jazz, dance music, Eastern polyrhythms and harmolodic textures in a lively sound mix.... [T]he music fairly crackles."

== Track listing (original Rough Trade LP and remixed Japanese CD) ==
All compositions by James Blood Ulmer

1. "Layout" – 5:02
2. "Pressure" – 3:48
3. "Interview" – 3:06
4. "Jazz Is the Teacher (Funk Is the Preacher)" – 4:19
5. "See-Through" – 3:50
6. "Time Out" – 5:19
7. "T.V. Blues" – 4:32
8. "Light Eyed" – 3:56
9. "Revelation March" – 3:18
10. "Are You Glad to Be in America?" – 4:37

Recorded at RCA Studios, New York City, on January 17, 1980.

== Personnel ==
- James Blood Ulmer – guitar, vocals
- David Murray – tenor saxophone
- Oliver Lake – alto saxophone
- Olu Dara – trumpet
- Billy Patterson (Spaceman Patterson) – rhythm guitar (track 4)
- Amin Ali – electric bass
- G. Calvin Weston, Ronald Shannon Jackson – drums
