= Children of the Forest (album) =

Studio album by Milford Graves with Arthur Doyle and Hugh Glover
- Released: 2023
- Recorded: January 24, 1976; February 2, 1976; March 11, 1976
- Studio: Queens, New York
- Genre: Free jazz
- Length: 54:20
- Label: Black Editions Archive; BEA-002
- Producer: Michael Ehlers, Peter Kolovos

Milford Graves chronology
Stories (2000)	Children of the Forest (2023)

Children of the Forest is an album by percussionist Milford Graves on which he is joined by saxophonists Arthur Doyle and Hugh Glover. It was recorded at Graves' basement laboratory and workshop in Queens, New York, in early 1976, in the months preceding the session that yielded the album Bäbi, which featured the same personnel. The album, which includes photographs by Val Wilmer, was released in 2023 on vinyl as a double LP set by Black Editions Archive as part of the Milford Graves Archival series.

== Reception ==
Professional ratings
Review scores
Source	Rating
AllMusic	4/5 stars

In a review for AllMusic, Thom Jurek wrote: "Any recording of unreleased material from master drummer/percussionist Milford Graves is noteworthy. When it is excavated from the artist's most visionary period, it's an occasion for celebration... Taken whole, or as the sum of its incidental parts, Children of the Forest is not only a major revelation in Graves' catalog, but a mirror of the creative state of improvised music in New York during the mid-'70s."

Dusted Magazine's Michael Rosenstein stated: "The torrid rawness of these recordings looks toward the torrential barrage of Bäbi but brings out a more ritualistic edge to the playing... The sessions released on Children of the Forest... provide a welcome addition to the documentation of the lineage of Graves' musical legacy. Here's to hoping that Black Editions continues to mine the Prof's archives."

Phil Freeman of Stereogum called the first of the March 11, 1976, recordings "wild shit, free jazz of the 'expect an angry phone call from the neighbors' school," with Graves "hitting so hard he's almost overloading the tape," and Doyle "shrieking and howling at full power, never easing off for an instant." Regarding the same track, NPR's Daniel A. Brown acknowledged the "purifying, holy flame of post-Coltrane and -Ayler fire music," and noted that it "seems to ask the listener: 'How free do you truly want to be?'" He commented: "Before anyone could possibly respond, Graves unrolls polyrhythmic and roiling drum patterns and, within moments, Doyle detonates the brass plating of his saxophone through sheer force of his berserk lung power."

Writing for The Free Jazz Collective, Nick Ostrum described the album as "a raw, effusively energetic and absolutely essential contribution to each of these musicians' catalogs... free jazz at its best, its most destructive (or deconstructive)." FJC's Fotis Nikolakopoulos remarked: "Children of the Forest is and will be the archival release of the year, maybe the most important archival release of some time now... this is music of transcendence and magic, a journey from the coast of West Africa to the East Coast of U.S.A. and back. It must be heard, everywhere."

The New York City Jazz Record's Pierre Crépon wrote: "the point here is not to flow freely in every direction but to work concentratedly on specific registers and how one simple sound could matter... this release is an example of archival material done properly: truly unheard music, substantial notes... and great photography."

In an article for There Stands the Glass, Bill Brownlee called the album "54 minutes of raw power" and a "scathing barrage," and stated: "when I'm in need of visceral catharsis, I go all in on improvised cacophony... The transcendently harsh Children of the Forest is essential noise."

== Track listing ==
All music by Milford Graves.

Disc 1

1. "March 11, 1976 I" – 12:00
2. "March 11, 1976 II" – 4:42
3. "March 11, 1976 III" – 9:38

Disc 2

1. "Jan 24, 1976 I" – 10:12
2. "Jan 24, 1976 II" – 6:10
3. "Jan 24, 1976 III" – 1:41
4. "Jan 24, 1976 IV" – 6:55
5. "Feb 2, 1976 I" – 3:14

== Personnel ==
- Milford Graves – drums, percussion
- Arthur Doyle – tenor saxophone, flute (disc 1)
- Hugh Glover – klaxon, percussion, vaccine (a Haitian one-note trumpet), tenor saxophone (disc 1; disc 2, tracks 1–4)
