= Meditation Among Us =

Studio album by Milford Graves
- Released: 1977
- Recorded: July 28, 1977
- Venue: Polydor 1st Studio, Tokyo
- Genre: free jazz
- Length: 36:05
- Label: Kitty Records; MKF 1021
- Producer: Hideto Isoda

Milford Graves chronology
Bäbi (1977)	Meditation Among Us (1977)	Grand Unification (1998)

Meditation Among Us is an album by American percussionist Milford Graves, recorded in July 1977 and released later that year by Kitty Records. The album features Graves on drums, percussion, and piano, along with Kaoru Abe on alto and sopranino saxophones, Mototeru Takagi on tenor saxophone, Toshinori Kondo on trumpet and alto horn, and Toshiyuki Tsuchitori on drums and percussion. It was recorded while Graves was visiting Japan with dancer Min Tanaka.

== Reception ==
Professional ratings
Review scores
Source	Rating
AllMusic	4/5 stars
The Penguin Guide to Jazz	2.5/4 stars

In a review for AllMusic, Thom Jurek awarded the album 4 stars, and wrote: "The blowing intensity on any Graves' date is intense, but here it is over the top, as the Japanese players attempt to match his intensity."

Writing for The Wire, Alan Licht commented: "Graves firmly establishes himself as the pivotal figure, driving the ensemble but also acting as its steady hub, enabling the music to flow without fraying. 'Together and Moving' bristles with the excitement of the occasion yet it remains taut and purposeful. On 'Response' Graves plays piano, contemplative at first, then torrential."

In an article for Artforum, David Grundy called the tracks "extraordinarily joyous, multiphonic squalls, as if every rhythm under the sun were sounding at the same time."

A reviewer at Destination Out stated that "Response" "ranges widely, beginning as a percussion workout spurred by Graves' gripping ululations. Graves then moves to the piano for an open, searching episode, suggesting echoes of Alice Coltrane's spiritual pursuits. Not surprisingly, Graves has a highly percussive approach to the piano, and gradually leads the horns to moments of abandon, before the concluding cool down. This is exactly the sort of meditation we can get behind — one that finds beauty in quiet moments as well as the storms life throws at us all."

== Track listing ==
1. "Together and Moving" - 19:56
2. "Response" - 16:04
- Recorded on July 28, 1977, at Polydor 1st Studio, Tokyo.

== Personnel ==
- Milford Graves – drums, percussion, piano, voice
- Kaoru Abe – alto saxophone, sopranino saxophone
- Mototeru Takagi – tenor saxophone
- Toshinori Kondo – trumpet, alto horn
- Toshiyuki Tsuchitori – drums, percussion
