= Sabu Toyozumi =

Japanese jazz drummer and erhu player

Yoshisaburo "Sabu" Toyozumi (born Tsurumi, Yokohama; 1943) is one of the small group of musical pioneers who comprised the first generation playing free improvisation music in Japan. As an improvising drummer he played and recorded with many of the key figures in Japanese free music including the two principal figures in the first generation, Masayuki Takayanagi and Kaoru Abe from the late 1960s onwards. He is one of a very few of this circle who are still alive and engaged in playing this music today.

Toyozumi features on numerous commercially available recordings with many of the most notable Japanese and international improvising musicians including Derek Bailey, Mototeru Takagi, Misha Mengelberg, Peter Brötzmann, Keiji Haino, Otomo Yoshihide, Tom Cora and Fred Van Hove.

In 1971 he became the only non-American member of the Association for the Advancement of Creative Musicians(AACM)). He dedicated his first record as a leader, Sabu – Message to Chicago, to compositions by AACM members, and in 1992 toured and recorded with AACM trumpeter Wadada Leo Smith.

Toyozumi has been instrumental in bringing many European and American improvisers to Japan including Derek Bailey, Misha Mengelberg and Sunny Murray.

In 2005 British improvising guitarist and promoter John Russell arranged a two-day event dedicated to Toyozumi in which the drummer performed in different groupings with 14 musicians from the London improvised music scene including, most notably, Evan Parker, Lol Coxhill, Phil Minton, John Edwards and Steve Beresford. The Wire described his playing at this time as follows: "He’s busy, but there’s always space between his notes, and he avoids the flashy technical solution to musical problems. His playing is crisp and dramatic, with a very occasional use of repetition to spark a climax. If it’s possible for a drum kit to ask awkward questions, Toyozumi seems to be doing it".

In an interview with Cadence Magazine in 1988 Toyozumi makes clear the importance of his relationship with nature as an influence on his playing and Clive Bell writing in The Wire in 2005 notes "his devotion to the way of Watazumido, the late shakuhachi player and Zen master, whose performances mixed martial arts and music in a bizarre cocktail of discipline and craziness".

In 2009 he returned to London to feature as one of the players in Russell's improvisation festival Fete Quaqua which was recorded for broadcast by BBC Radio 3. He continues to tour widely and in the past year or so has performed in Belgium and France, Chile, Taiwan, England, Philippines and Greece. He also performs from time to time with the legendary Japanese noise group Hijokaidan. Currently he performs on the erhu – a two-stringed Chinese violin – as often as playing the drums.

== Selected discography ==
Sabu Toyozumi has performed on over 80 published recordings. A full discography is maintained at Sabu Toyozumi Discography. Besides those listed below, Toyozumi also appears on recordings by Anthony Braxton, Charles Mingus and Stomu Yamashta.

As band leader

- Sabu – Message to Chicago (1974), Trio Records/Nadja with Ryoh Hara and Syoji Ukaji
- Water Weed (1975), Trio Records – with Takashi Tokuhiro and Mototeru Takagi
- Sublimation (2004), Bishop Records – with Kawasaki Jun, Kando Hideaki and Iizuka Satoshi
- Son's Scapegoat (2006), Siwa- with Kondo Hideaki, Kawasaki Jun and Takuo Tanigawa

With Masayuki Takayanagi's New Directions

- Independence: Tread on Sure Ground (1970), Union Records
- Call in Question (1970), P.S.F. Records
- Live Independence (1970), P.S.F. Records

Improvising collaborations

- Saxophone Adventure (1970), Philips – with Mototeru Takagi
- Overhang Party (1978), ALM – with Kaoru Abe
- Sabu Brotzman Duo (1982), Improvised Company – with Peter Brötzmann
- What Are You Talking About? (1983), DIW – with Tristan Honsinger, Toshinori Kondo and Peter Kowald
- Sabu Bailey Brotzman Trio (1987), Improvised Company – with Derek Bailey and Peter Brötzmann
- Ars Longa Dens Brevis (1987), Allelopathy – with Fred Frith, John Zorn and Onnyk
- Cosmos Has Spirit (1992), Scissors – with Wadada Leo Smith
- Two Strings Will Do It (1994), PSF – with Barre Phillips and Keiji Haino
- Fragrance (1998), Nds – with Paul Rutherford
- The Crushed Pellet (2003), Studio Wee – with Eiichi Hayashi and Otomo Yoshihide
- Live in Japan (2003), Qbico – with Arthur Doyle and Takashi Mizutani
- If Ocean is Broken (2009), Qbico – with Mototeru Takagi
- Crimson Lip (2009), Improvising Beings – with Alan Silva, Keiko Higuchi and Takuo Tanikawa
- New Sea (2012), Kaitai Records – with Takashi Kako and Mototeru Takagi
- Kosai Yujyo (2012), Improvising Beings – with various musicians
- The Untrammeled Traveller (2013), Chap Chap Records – with Misha Mengelberg
- The Conscience (2017), NoBusiness – with Paul Rutherford

With Hijokaidan

- Split (2010), Harbinger Sound, split LP with Airway
- Made in Japan (2012), Doubtmusic
