= Takagi Mototeru =

Japanese tenor saxophone player (born 1941)

- Born: December 28, 1941; Osaka, Japan
- Died: December 2002 (aged 60–61)
- Genres: Jazz
- Occupation: Musician
- Instrument: Tenor saxophone

Takagi Mototeru (高木 元輝) (28 December 1941 – December 2002) was a Japanese tenor saxophone player and composer, known for playing in a distinctive and powerful free jazz style. He played with many of the most important Japanese free groups and musicians during the seventies, such as ESSG and those of Masahiko Togashi, Motoharu Yoshizawa and Masayuki Takayanagi.

== History ==
Takagi was born in Osaka in 1941. He grew up in Yokohama. During his younger years, he spent time in the bands of players such as Charlie Ishiguro and Hisashi Sakurai. In 1968, he joined the Motoharu Yoshizawa Trio, which created fresh free sounds in Japanese jazz. Takagi also composed for the band. The following year he joined Togashi's Quartet and ESSG. After Togashi's accident, Takagi played briefly with Masayuki Takayangi's New Direction Unit and in a duo with percussionist Sabu Toyozumi. From November 1973 he spent one year playing in France, returning to Japan in November 1974.

Takagi recorded very few albums as a leader over the course of his career, but he was highly valued as a collaborator by many Japanese jazz, rock and avant-garde musicians.

== Discography ==
=== As leader/co-leader ===
- We Now Create, w/ Masahiko Togashi Quartet (Victor, 1969)
- Isolation, w/ Masahiko Togashi (Columbia, 1971; recorded 1969)
- Speed & Space, w/ Masahiko Togashi Quartet (Union, 1969)
- Come back to Foster, w/ 1864 Cotton Field Rock Band (Victor, 1970)
- If Ocean Is Broken w/ Sabu Toyozumi (Qbico, 2006) – recorded in 1970
- Amalgamation (Kokotsu no Showa Genroku), w/ Masahiko Sato & Soundbreakers (Liberty, 1971)
- Jazz a Maison du Japon Paris, w/ Takashi Kako (Nadja, 1974)
- Origination, w/ Toshiyuki Tsuchitori (ALM, 1975)
- Mothra Freight! (Interval, 1975)
- Waterweed, w/ Sabu Toyozumi (1975)
- Story of Wind Behind Left, w/ Masahiko Togashi Quartet (Columbia, 1975)
- Meditation Among Us, w/ Milford Graves et al. (Kitty, 1976)
- Concrete Voices, w/ EEU (1977)
- Talking about Fussa, w/ King Kong Paradise (Tam, 1977)
- Duo & Trio, w/ Derek Bailey et al. (Kitty, 1978)
- Grow, w/ Koji Kikuchi (Johnny's Way, 1986)
- Kozan, w/ Hirokazu Yamada & Motoharu Yoshizawa (Tiara, 1986)
- Call in Question, w/ Masayuki Takayanagi New Direction (PSF, 1993) - recorded in 1970
- Deep Sea/Abyss Duo 1969 (Shinkai), w/ Motoharu Yoshizawa (PSF, 1994) - recorded in 1969
- 2001.07.06 (Chitei, 2001)
- Domo Arigato Derek Sensei, w/ Henry Kaiser et al. (Balance Point Acoustics, 2006)
- If Ocean Is Broken w/ Sabu Toyozumi (Qbico, 2009)
- Blue Sea (滄) w/ Takashi Kako, Sabu Toyozumi (Kaitai, 2012)
- New Sea (新海) w/ Takashi Kako, Sabu Toyozumi (Kaitai, 2012)
- Live at FarOut, Atsugi 1987 (NoBusiness, 2020) w/ Derek Bailey – live recorded in 1987

=== Other appearances ===
- V.A., 2 to 10 Saxophone Adventure (Phillips, 1970)
- V.A., Sensational Jazz '70 (Columbia, 1970)
- V.A., Genya (Soseki, 1971)
- V.A., Inspiration & Power 14 (1973)
