= Grand Unification (disambiguation) =

Grand Unification is the theory of the unification of three of the fundamental forces of nature.

Grand Unification may also refer to:

- Grand Unification (Fightstar album), a 2006 album by Fightstar
- Grand Unification (Milford Graves album), a 1998 album by Milford Graves
