= Percussion Ensemble (album) =

Studio album by Milford Graves
- Released: 1966
- Recorded: July 1965
- Label: ESP-Disk

Milford Graves chronology
| Percussion Ensemble (1966) | Bäbi (1977) |

Percussion Ensemble is an album by American percussionist Milford Graves, recorded in July 1965 and released in 1966 by the ESP-Disk label. On the album, Graves is joined by fellow percussionist Sonny Morgan (also known as Sunny Morgan). The two had previously recorded together on the Montego Joe albums Arriba! and Wild & Warm. Morgan would go on to play and record regularly with Leon Thomas and others, but died in 1976.

According to Graves, additional musicians were supposed to be involved in the recording, but "people couldn't cut it. I had a few name guys in there, but they couldn't understand the concept... Sonny Morgan, he was just an unbelievable guy. He was the one who could cut it. So, we'd wind up with just a duo." Regarding the titles of the pieces, Graves explained that they were assigned numbers according to how many beats were in each measure. Concerning the use of the term "nothing", Graves stated: "I was really involved with yoga... Bernard had said something about being nothing. I remember telling him, 'I want it "Nothing."' I didn't make a commitment to Buddhism or anything, but I was reading all that stuff... So, by the time that record came, all of that was there."

== Reception ==
Professional ratings
Review scores
| Source | Rating |
|---|---|
| AllMusic | 2.5/5 stars |
| All About Jazz | 5/5 stars |
| The Penguin Guide to Jazz | 2/4 stars |

Val Wilmer wrote that the recording "remains just about the most brilliantly conceived and executed percussion album to date."

Writing for All About Jazz, Lyn Horton commented: "The music defies stereotyping. It is not concerned with keeping time or playing riffs. Rather, the two players are just talking in 'drum' using their hands as mouthpieces. The continuation of their movement not only exhales a tonal diversity, which unfolds unpredictably and without precedence, but also evolves without destination. There is no place to go except where the music takes them... Although Graves and Morgan had, within their reach, instruments that fall within the category of percussion, the richness of the vocabulary applied to them pushes the sound beyond the realm of expectation. Because every percussive phrase or succession of phrases is essentially complete, the twosome breaks patterns before even establishing them, rendering the music more immediate than time itself."

In a review for AllMusic, Alex Henderson wrote that the album "is... a rare example of a free jazz recording that offers percussion instruments exclusively... [it] isn't nearly as interesting as some might hope. Graves and Morgan's performances are aimless and not terribly inspired; unlike many of the avant-garde jazz recordings that Graves was a part of in the 1960s, this 33-minute disc never really catches fire and never goes anywhere."

David Toop wrote: "Listen to 'Nothing 11 – 10’, overlaid rhythms stepping as if masks on stilts: high-tuned drums, shaken bells, shakers that move as the hand moves, incantatory vocalizations barely audible behind the night forest of sound, deep drums, a deeper drum – the ground and its deeps. Rather than rushing forward in an imagined line of unfolding time, stasis and perpetual movement oscillate in circles of shingled layers, a centripetal spiralling inward to the centre of nothingness: deep drum, gong, silence."

== Track listing ==
All compositions by Milford Graves.

1. "Nothing 5-7" – 2:35
2. "Nothing 11-10" – 6:15
3. "Nothing 19" – 7:40
4. "Nothing 13" – 5:30
5. "Nothing" – 12:32

Recorded in July 1965.

== Personnel ==
- Milford Graves – drums, bells
- Sonny Morgan – drums, bells, gong, shaker
