= Space/Time – Redemption =

Studio album by Milford Graves and Bill Laswell
- Released: 2014
- Recorded: September and October 2013
- Studio: Orange Music Sound Studios, West Orange, New Jersey
- Genre: Free jazz
- Length: 1:01:23
- Label: TUM Records; TUM CD 040
- Producer: Bill Laswell

Space/Time – Redemption is an album by drummer Milford Graves and bassist Bill Laswell. It was recorded in September and October 2013, and was released by TUM Records in 2014. The duo also recorded a second album, titled The Stone, in 2014.

When asked to describe the experience of playing with Laswell as a rhythm section without a "horn out front," Graves responded: "I guess it's according to what kind of tradition you’re coming from... So-called Western culture, they changed the hierarchy of instrumentation... Some people may think they have to make adjustments, if that's what they came from, a so-called Western concept, where drums are in the background." Graves continued: "with this particular situation with Bill and myself... our understanding exceeds a single concept of how to play music. So that way, you can have more to say on the instrument, than if you're just playing one particular style of music... So bass and drums? No problem. As long as the bass player's right, as long as he can stretch."

== Reception ==
Professional ratings
Review scores
Source	Rating
DownBeat	4/5 stars
AllMusic	3.5/5 stars
PopMatters	8/10 stars
All About Jazz #1	4/5 stars
All About Jazz #2	5/5 stars
Audiophile Audition	4/5 stars

DownBeat reviewer Ken Micallef called Graves "the cosmic connection between the free-jazz of Albert Ayler, Don Pullen and Sonny Sharrock and the internal/external rhythms of the cosmos," and commented: "Space/Time – Redemption is a wild ride between glowing improvisation and spooky drone theory. Playing the same psychedelic-swirl drumset he has since the early '70s, Graves rides aloft Laswell's flowing bass lines, playing chattering rhythms on drums, bells, bongos and all manner of odd percussion."

In a review for AllMusic, Thom Jurek wrote: "This duet recording... is remarkable on many levels... Laswell and Graves display an inherent and profound sensitivity in their approach to this material. While none of these five tracks is less than nine minutes long, there is precious little to any excess involved... Space/Time – Redemption is a welcome engagement by two players communicating on a deep and intricate level, listening deeply while simultaneously going all-in."

John Garratt of PopMatters stated: "Space/Time – Redemption goes beyond 'good', or 'decent', or 'admirable'. This one-hour jam is an extraordinary creature with a nervous system and a pulse, fermenting underneath the perceived limitations of the instruments involved. It's hardly a 'look at how clever we can be with limited tools!' gimmick, more of a 'hey, try this on' kind of invitation."

Writing for All About Jazz, Dave Wayne commented: "A musical odd couple, perhaps, these guys are two of the deepest musical thinkers (and doers) of their time. Their collaboration... is nothing less than fascinating." In a separate All About Jazz review, Budd Kopman stated: "Each improvised piece has its own flow. Graves' playing is highly complex in its use of constantly changing polyrhythms, but is also surprisingly simple and direct in its emotional message. Laswell provides at times long, flowing lines that are anchored tonally to the bass drum, and at other times provides counter rhythmic sounds, playing off Graves. The total effect is mesmerizing and deeply emotional. Through Graves and Laswell, we can begin to understand that we are not merely isolated, single atoms being tossed about in a chaotic and incomprehensible universe, but rather that we are a part of the universe that is conscious of itself."

In an article for Jazz Weekly, George W. Harris wrote: "What keeps this from devolving into either a self indulgent cacophony or repetitious rhythm workout is the fact that Laswell mixes up the basses and creates some fascinating sounds... Graves varies between drum patterns and tambourine dashes... to rumbling thunder with resonant rock hints."

John Sunier, in a review for Audiophile Audition, remarked: "The five extensive pieces feature Graves' expressive, constantly evolving approach to rhythm; while Laswell displays his sometimes neglected musical intuition and ability to furnish astute accompaniment and provide relatable improvisations... There is lyricism, although not the sort which is easy to grasp; and melodicism, but also not spoon-fed."

Writing for Burning Ambulance, Phil Freeman commented: "It's hard to think of a precedent for Space/Time – Redemption—it's a collision of two sounds, two aesthetics, that on the surface couldn’t be farther apart. But at the same time, pairing Milford Graves with a more 'traditionally free' bassist would probably have just resulted in an hour of flurrying clatter-and-boing, and been much less satisfying than this weird, dreamlike encounter."

In an article for Red Bull Music Academy, Hank Shteamer wrote: "Space/Time – Redemption is unlike any other Milford Graves recording. Thanks to Laswell's atmospheric approach, it has a luminous, inviting feel – more ambient meditation than free-jazz tussle. It’s one of the year's most immersive albums."

== Track listing ==
1. "Eternal Signs" – 9:03
2. "Sonny Sharrock" – 10:04
3. "Another Space" – 17:28
4. "Autopossession" – 9:08
5. "Another Time" – 15:33

== Personnel ==
- Milford Graves – drums, percussion
- Bill Laswell – bass
