= Motoharu Yoshizawa =

Japanese bassist

Motoharu Yoshizawa (吉沢元治) (1931 – September 12, 1998) was a Japanese bassist and composer known for playing in a distinctive free jazz and free improvisation style, sometimes deploying electronics and using the unusual self-designed five-string bass he referred to as the "Tiritack".

Yoshizawa collaborated with innumerable musicians over his long career; some of the better known include Masayuki Takayanagi, Masahiko Togashi, Takehisa Kosugi, Mototeru Takagi, Kaoru Abe, Steve Lacy, Dave Burrell, Derek Bailey, Evan Parker, Barre Phillips, Butch Morris, Elliott Sharp, Ikue Mori, Keiji Haino, Kan Mikami, Kazuki Tomokawa, Christopher Yohmei Blasdel & Tenko.

== History ==
Yoshizawa began playing in a free style in the mid-1960s, in groups with Yosuke Yamashita and Kazunori Takeda, as well as in a famous jam session with Elvin Jones during John Coltrane's Japan tour of 1966. Yoshizawa's own trio with Mototeru Takagi was pivotal for Japanese free jazz, though no recordings survive. He also composed for the band. In 1969, Yoshizawa played with Masahiko Togashi's famous quartet and Masayuki Takayanagi's New Directions group, participating in both groups' landmark recording sessions of that year.

Yoshizawa was a pioneer of solo bass performance, his experiments synchronous with those of Barre Phillips. He first played this style in 1969, though nothing was recorded until several years later. In the mid-1970s, Yoshizawa recorded three albums for solo bass. Later in the decade he had a fruitful collaboration with alto saxophonist Kaoru Abe, which led to the recording of one album, Nord.

In the 1990s, Yoshizawa began experimenting with an effects-laden, five-string bass of his own design. He spent six months living and playing in New York in 1989–90.

== Discography ==
Solo

- V.A., Inspiration and Power 14 (Trio, 1973; CD reissue, PJL, 2003)
- Inland Fish (Trio, 1974; CD reissue, PJL, 2003)
- The Cracked Mirror and the Fossil Bird (Kojima, 1975; CD reissue, PSF, 1994)
- Outfit - Bass solo II (Trio, 1976; CD reissue, PJL, 2004)
- From the faraway nearby (PSF, 1992)
- Empty Hats (PSF, 1994)
- Play unlimited (PSF, 1997)
- V.A., Halana No. 3 magazine/CD (Halana, 1997)
- V.A., Halana No. 4 magazine/CD (Halana, 1998)
- It's a day - Last bass solo live video (Pelmage Records, 1999)

Duos, Trios, Quartets.

- We now create, Masahiko Togashi Quartet (Victor, 1969; CD reissue, Bridge, 2006)
- Independence, Masayuki Takayanagi and New Directions (Teichiku,1969)
- Call in Question, Masayuki Takayanagi & New Directions (PSF, 1993; recorded 1970)
- Live Independence, Masayuki Takayanagi & New Directions (PSF, 1994; recorded 1970)
- Dreams, w/ Dave Burrell (Trio, 1974; CD reissue, PJL, 2003)
- Duo and Trio Improvisation, w/ Derek Bailey et al. (Polydor, 1978; CD reissue, Disk Union, 1992)
- Aida's Call, w/Derek Bailey, Kaoru Abe & Toshinori Kondo (Starlight Furniture Company, recorded 1978)
- OOPS, w/ Takao Haga (T.H.I.S., 1980)
- Kita (Nord), w/ Kaoru Abe (ALM, 1981)
- Kozan, w/ Hirokazu Yamada & Mototeru Takagi (Tiara, 1986)
- Live in the First Year of Heisei Vol.1, w/ Keiji Haino & Kan Mikami (PSF, 1990)
- Live in the First Year of Heisei Vol.2, w/ Keiji Haino & Kan Mikami (PSF, 1990)
- Gobbledygook NY Live, w/ Ikue Mori, Butch Morris, Elliott Sharp (PSF,1990)
- Angels have passed, w/ Takehisa Kosugi & Haruna Miyake (PSF, 1992)
- Deep Sea/Abyss, w/ Mototeru Takagi (PSF, 1993)
- Uzu, w/ Barre Phillips (PSF, 1996)
- Company in Japan video, w/ Shonosuke Okura, Koichi Makigami, Sachiko Nagata, Kenichi Takeda, Wataru Okuma, Kazue Sawai, Derek Bailey, Yukihiro Isso & Keizo Inoue (Incus, 1996)
- Welcome - Motoharu Yoshizawa Last Live, w/ Gyaatees (Captain Trip Records, 1999)
- Okidoki, w/ Barre Phillips & Kim Dae Hwan (Chap Chap Records, 1999)
- Domo Arigato Derek Sensei, w/ Henry Kaiser et al. (Balance Point Acoustics, 2006)

Guest Appearances

- Steve Lacy, Stalks (Nippon Columbia, 1975)
- Steve Lacy, The Wire (Nippon Columbia, 1977)
- Christopher Yohmei Blasdel, Voices from Afar, Voices from Within (Teichiku, 1990)
- Tenko, At the top of Mt. Brocken (RecRec, 1993)
- Kan Mikami, Kazuki Tomokawa et al., Goen (PSF, 1993)
- Kazuki Tomokawa, Playing with Phantoms (PSF, 1993)
- Kazuki Tomokawa, Hitori Bon-odori (PSF, 1994)
- Kikuchi Masaaki, Bass sonority (Bass workshop vol.1) (Soup disk, 1995)
- Lawrence D. Butch Morris, Testament : A Conduction Collection (New World, 1996)
- Evan Parker, Synergetics - Phonomanie III (Leo, 1996)
- Company, Epiphany by Company (Incus, 2001)
