= Real Deal (album) =

Studio album by David Murray & Milford Graves
- Released: 1992
- Recorded: November 3, 1991
- Genre: Free jazz
- Length: 63:49
- Label: DIW
- Producer: Kazunori Sugiyama

David Murray chronology
Fast Life (1993)	Real Deal (1992)	A Sanctuary Within (1994)

Real Deal is an album by David Murray and Milford Graves released on the Japanese DIW label in 1992. It features eight duo performances by Murray and Graves.

== Reception ==
The AllMusic review awarded the album 3 stars.

Professional ratings
Review scores
Source	Rating
Allmusic	3/5 stars

== Track listing ==
1. "Stated With Peace" (Murray) - 7:50
2. "The Third Day" (Murray) - 8:50
3. "Luxor" (Murray) - 8:30
4. "Under & Over" (Graves) - 6:04
5. "Moving About" (Graves) - 11:09
6. "Ultimate High Priest" (Graves) - 6:27
7. "Essential Soul" (Graves) - 10:49
8. "Continuity" (Murray) - 4:10

== Personnel ==
- David Murray - tenor saxophone
- Milford Graves - drums & percussion
