= Historic Music Past Tense Future =

Live album by Peter Brötzmann, Milford Graves, and William Parker
- Released: 2022
- Recorded: March 29, 2002
- Venue: CB's 313 Gallery, New York City
- Genre: Free jazz
- Label: Black Editions Archive; BEA-001
- Producer: Michael Ehlers, Peter Kolovos

Historic Music Past Tense Future is a double-LP live album by saxophonist Peter Brötzmann, drummer Milford Graves, and bassist William Parker. It was recorded in March 2002 at CB's 313 Gallery in New York City, and was released in 2022 by Black Editions Archive, a label focused on historical free jazz, with emphasis on the release of previously unavailable recordings by Graves.

== Reception ==
Professional ratings
Review scores
Source	Rating
The Free Jazz Collective	5/5 stars

Giovanni Russonello of The New York Times included the album in the publication's weekly playlist of notable new music, calling the musicians "lions of the avant-garde."

The Free Jazz Collective's Stuart Broomer awarded the album 5 stars, and commented: "This is one of those recordings that might be welcomed with simply respectful silence and celebration, or you might want to shout along at times... it's a kind of simultaneous Jeremiad and Hymn of Praise, for all the life missed, all the life lived and all the life possible, a vast collective utterance that has passed beyond all notions of comprehensible speech into absolute screaming and pounding, spell, convulsion, prayer and dance, at the seeming limits of human expression."

In an article for The Quietus, Peter Margasak wrote: "While the individual voice of each player is palpable, the long-term bond of Parker and Brötzmann is forced to adjust to the drummer's singular attack, a tom-heavy polymetric whirlwind that digs deeper into time than most of us can reckon with. The music is characteristically visceral, but the challenge for the listener is less in its energy than its groove-fracturing content."

Michael Rosenstein, writing for Dusted Magazine, called the album "an historic meeting," and stated: "While Brötzmann and Parker were playing regularly in various configurations by this point, the addition of Graves on drums incites the group to blazing heights. One is reminded of the ardent propulsive energy that Graves brought to sessions with New York Art Quartet, Giuseppi Logan or Albert Ayler in the 1960s, and here, his choreographed polyrhythms recall those celebrated alliances while drawing on the depth of his sonic research over the subsequent decades."

In an article for Stereogum, Phil Freeman called the album "incredible," and wrote: "Both saxophonist and drummer are in thunderous form on the four side-long jams that make up this double LP... with Parker keeping a steady pulse in the middle."

A reviewer at Doom and Gloom from the Tomb stated: "Brötzmann, Graves and Parker start strong and then get even stronger as the double LP progresses, finding scorching levels of intensity and uncanny interplay, the flames rising higher and higher. Freedom music, yeah, but with a focus and imagination that never lets you forget you're in the hands of three masters."

== Track listing ==
All compositions by Peter Brötzmann, Milford Graves, and William Parker.

=== Disc 1 ===
1. "Side A" – 15:33
2. "Side B" – 18:25

=== Disc 2 ===
1. "Side C" – 17:25
2. "Side D" – 16:42

== Personnel ==
- Peter Brötzmann – reeds
- Milford Graves – drums, vocals, dancing
- William Parker – bass, doussn'gouni
