= Sacred Ceremonies =

Studio album by Wadada Leo Smith with Milford Graves and Bill Laswell
- Released: May 21, 2021
- Recorded: December 11–12, 2015; May 26–27, 2016
- Studio: Orange Music Sound Studios, West Orange, New Jersey
- Genre: Free jazz
- Length: 2:55:13
- Label: TUM Records; BOX 003
- Producer: Petri Haussila

Wadada Leo Smith chronology
Trumpet (2021)	Sacred Ceremonies (2021)	The Chicago Symphonies (2021)

Sacred Ceremonies is a three-CD box set album by trumpeter and composer Wadada Leo Smith on which he is joined by drummer Milford Graves and electric bassist Bill Laswell. Disc one was recorded on May 27, 2016, and features Smith and Graves in duo format. Disc two was recorded on May 26, 2016, and features Smith and Laswell. The entire trio is heard on disc three, which was recorded on December 11 and 12, 2015. All three discs were recorded at Orange Music Sound Studios in West Orange, New Jersey. The album was released by TUM Records on May 21, 2021.

Sacred Ceremonies was issued by TUM as part of a series of box sets honoring Wadada Leo Smith's 80th birthday. It is unique in that it brings together Smith, a member of the first generation of musicians to come out of Chicago's Association for the Advancement of Creative Musicians (AACM) in the 1960s, Graves, a veteran of New York City's free jazz movement during the same era, and Laswell, who played a major role in the downtown scene of the 1970s. The album is dedicated to the memory of Graves, who died in early 2021. Smith stated: "Bill and I had the great pleasure of recording this special duet/trio project with Milford Graves and dedicate this music to him... Milford was one of the greatest master drummers of our times, who reshaped the way rhythms are played on the drum-set. We will miss him and so will the world."

== Reception ==
Professional ratings
Review scores
Source	Rating
All About Jazz	4/5 stars
AllMusic	4/5 stars
The Free Jazz Collective	5/5 stars
Jazz Journal	3.5/5 stars
Jazzwise	4/5 stars
PopMatters	8/10 stars
Tom Hull – on the Web	A−

Writing for DownBeat, Dave Cantor stated: "Listening to Smith and Graves assess history on 'Baby Dodds In Congo Square,' it's difficult to keep track of the drummer's polyrhythms, as the trumpeter narrates the importance of both the titular place and the musician. It's the sound of selflessness. When in duets with Laswell, the information being transmitted about song dedicatees Tony Williams or Donald Ayler is no less potent. And when Smith, Laswell and Graves perform together on Sacred Ceremonies' final disc, a sort of philosophical fervor electrifies the sonic discussions of myth, justice and healing energies."

In a review for All About Jazz, Karl Ackermann wrote: "Smith, Graves... and Laswell come from diverse experiences and significant achievements in music... The three define virtuosity and, in these various pairings, they eclipse genre and approach with unconventional ideas, beautifully executed." AAJ's Mike Jurkovic noted that the album documents "an event sharing sacred, indisputable truths (not alternate facts) about ourselves, our actions and the debris we've left behind," and commented: "Where Graves's percussion and Smith explore the spiritual rhythms that tie us all together, Laswell's bass and Smith investigate the ambiance between moments, the delicate shifts of light in the ether that either set us straight or knock us off-kilter and the tectonic whispers that declare us fruitful, wasteful or just harvesting memes."

The Free Jazz Collective's Nick Ostrum remarked: "From his earliest days in with Anthony Braxton, the AACM, or in his own solo expeditions, Smith has carved out his own singular space in such environments. His trumpet alternates between impeccable clarity and bluesy decay... The result is utterly mesmerizing."

Nigel Jarrett of Jazz Journal wrote: "Sacred Ceremonies will probably confirm sceptics of free jazz in their prejudices, and the fancy titles may reinforce them; for others, its intensities and mutual communing will signify an important summary of achievement."

In an article for PopMatters, John Garratt described the album as "a special document of musical kinship as well as a bold take on improvised music," and stated: "Sacred Ceremonies is classified as 'jazz' by default, but only broad strokes will do in the descriptive department. For all the avant-garde and free jazz elements at work here, Sacred Ceremonies is the sound of Smith drifting forward, grabbing inspiration from his surroundings and feeding them into his horn as he continues a music career that has lasted close to 50 years now. It's the sound of a never-ending search."

Richard Gehr of Relix noted that the album "serves as testament to the percussive genius of Graves... and to the late-period brilliance of Smith," and commented: "The two... duet albums contain beautifully austere dialogues that pay off in the joyful, bubbling swing of the trio in full spiritual flight."

Point of Departure's Chris Robinson remarked: "What most stands out about Sacred Ceremonies is how the music and interpersonal dynamics shift in the different configurations – which traits come to the fore, which recede, which compromises are made. It's a fascinating study in the ways master musicians with their own voices adapt to different contexts."

Writing for Jazz Trail, Filipe Freitas stated: "With these three extraordinary explorers, the improvisation can go anywhere as they discover as they go. Sometimes magical and ravishing, sometimes intriguing and dark, the music immerses the listeners in angular forms that are consistently good from start to finish."

A reviewer for Monarch Magazine wrote: "On Sacred Ceremonies, three masters go deeply, fearlessly and transcendently into this mysterious, magnificent thing we call music, and come up with an offering that feels like a gift from the universe."

Kevin Le Gendre of Jazzwise commented: "For the most part the pace is anything but frantic, and the medium tempo enables the spikes of energy and emphasis to be heard and felt all the more clearly. The brooding, skulking character of some of the songs occasionally squares the circle between Electric Miles and dub, but it is precisely the lack of expected guitars or keys that gives the music a far less dense yet nonetheless penetrating quality."

In a review for Jazz Weekly, George W. Harris noted that Smith "sounds fresher and stronger than ever," and remarked: "The most amazing fact of this ambitious collection is that it actually works, always keeping your attention. It must be taken in small doses, but each bite is quite filling."

Rock and Roll Globe's Todd Manning wrote: "Smith is a legendary figure in Free Jazz, but his importance is not relegated to the past... Sacred Ceremonies illustrate[s] that he is an incredibly powerful and relevant contemporary voice... [it] amplifies Smith's unique voice by matching him with two other towering figures."

== Track listing ==
Disc 1 - Wadada Leo Smith and Milford Graves

1. "Nyoto - Part 1" – 4:29
2. "Nyoto - Part 2" – 10:43
3. "Nyoto -Part 3" – 6:44
4. "Baby Dodds in Congo Square" – 13:43
5. "Celebration Rhythms" – 6:44
6. "Poetic Sonics" – 5:28
7. "The Poet: Play Ebody, Play Ivory (Dedicated to Henry Dumas)" – 5:57

Disc 2 - Wadada Leo Smith and Bill Laswell

1. "Ascending the Sacred Waterfall - A Ceremonial Practice" – 11:12
2. "Prince - The Blue Diamond Spirit" – 6:12
3. "Donald Ayler's Rainbow Summit" – 7:08
4. "Tony Williams" – 4:55
5. "Mysterious Night" – 7:34
6. "Earth - A Morning Song" – 6:31
7. "Minnie Ripperton - The Chicago Bronzeville Master Blaster" – 13:02

Disc 3 - Wadada Leo Smith, Bill Laswell and Milford Graves

1. "Social Justice. A Fire for Reimagining the World" – 6:35
2. "Myths of Civilizations and Revolutions" – 8:48
3. "Truth in Expansion" – 10:13
4. "The Healer's Direct Energy" – 11:04
5. "Waves of Elevated Horizontal Forces" – 11:00
6. "An Epic Journey Inside the Center of Color" – 6:32
7. "Ruby Red Largo - A Sonnet" – 10:52

== Personnel ==
- Wadada Leo Smith – trumpet
- Milford Graves – drums, percussion
- Bill Laswell – basses
