= Milford Graves =

American jazz drummer and percussionist (1941–2021)

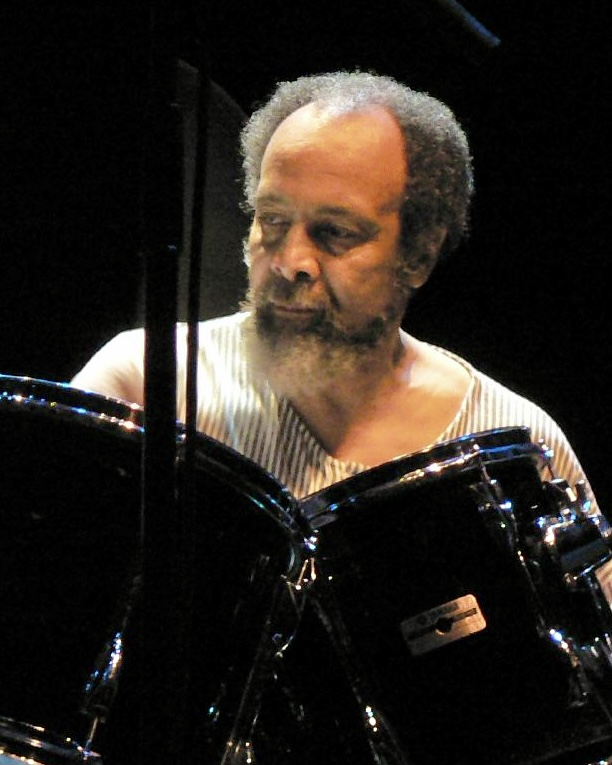

Background information
- Born: August 20, 1941; Jamaica, Queens, New York, U.S.
- Died: February 12, 2021 (aged 79)
- Genres: Jazz; free jazz; avant-garde jazz; world music
- Instruments: Drums; timbales; conga drums; vocals
- Years active: 1962-2021
- Labels: ESP; Prestige; Fontana; RCA; Tzadik
- Formerly of: New York Art Quartet
- Website: milfordgraves.com

Milford Graves (August 20, 1941 – February 12, 2021) was an American jazz drummer, percussionist, Professor Emeritus of Music, researcher/inventor, visual artist/sculptor, gardener/herbalist, and martial artist. Graves was noteworthy for his early avant-garde contributions in the 1960s with Paul Bley, Albert Ayler, and the New York Art Quartet, and is considered to be a free jazz pioneer, liberating percussion from its timekeeping role. The composer and saxophonist John Zorn referred to Graves as "basically a 20th-century shaman."

== Early life ==
Graves was born in Jamaica, Queens, New York City, on August 20, 1941. He began playing drums when he was three years old, and was introduced to the congas at age eight. He also studied timbales and African hand drumming at an early age. By the early 1960s, he was leading dance bands and playing in Latin/Afro Cuban ensembles in New York on bills alongside Cal Tjader and Herbie Mann. His group, the Milford Graves Latino Quintet, included saxophonist Pete Yellin, pianist Chick Corea, bassist Lisle Atkinson, and conga player Bill Fitch.

== Career ==
In 1962, Graves heard the John Coltrane quartet with Elvin Jones, whose drumming made a strong impression. The following year, Graves acquired a standard drum set from pianist Hal Galper and began using it regularly. That summer, percussionist Don Alias invited Graves to Boston for a residency, and Graves began playing with saxophonist Giuseppi Logan.

During a visit to New York in 1964, Logan introduced Graves to trombonist Roswell Rudd and saxophonist John Tchicai. Graves "wound up playing with them for half an hour, astonishing Rudd and Tchicai, who promptly invited him to join what became The New York Art Quartet." Rudd recalled that Graves's "playing was like an anti-gravity vortex, in which you could either float or fly depending on your impulse." According to Tchicai, "Graves simply baffled both Rudd and I in that, at that time, we hadn't heard anybody of the younger musicians in New York that had the same sense of rhythmic cohesion in polyrhythms or the same sense of intensity and musicality." Tchicai also stated that Don Moore, the original New York Art Quartet bassist, "became so frightened of this wizard of a percussionist that he decided that this couldn't be true or possible and therefore refused to play with us."

That same year, Graves also participated in the "October Revolution in Jazz" organized by Bill Dixon, and appeared on a number of recordings, including the New York Art Quartet's self-titled debut album, Giuseppi Logan's debut album, which also featured pianist Don Pullen and bassist Eddie Gómez, Paul Bley's Barrage, Montego Joe's Arriba! Con Montego Joe (which also featured Chick Corea and Gómez), and the Jazz Composer's Orchestra's Communication. Graves also briefly played with Albert Ayler's trio, which included bassist Gary Peacock and drummer Sunny Murray, as a second drummer. This combination of musicians inspired John Coltrane to add Rashied Ali as a second drummer the following year.

In 1965, Graves continued to expand his horizons, studying the tabla with Wasantha Singh and recording with Miriam Makeba on Makeba Sings!. He also recorded and released a percussion album titled Percussion Ensemble, which featured drummer Sonny Morgan. Val Wilmer wrote that the recording "remains just about the most brilliantly conceived and executed percussion album to date." That year, Graves also recorded on the New York Art Quartet's second album Mohawk, on Montego Joe's second album, Wild & Warm, on Lowell Davidson's sole release, and on a second album with Giuseppi Logan, again working with Don Pullen. Graves and Pullen soon formed a duo, and in 1966 they recorded and released In Concert at Yale University, followed by Nommo, on their SRP ("Self Reliance Project") label.

Graves joined Albert Ayler's band in 1967, replacing Beaver Harris. The group performed at Slugs' Saloon, at the Newport Jazz Festival, and, on July 21, at John Coltrane's funeral. (Recordings of this performance were released in 2004 on the compilation Holy Ghost.) Later that year, the group recorded Love Cry. Graves left Ayler's band when Impulse! began pushing Ayler in a more commercial direction.

Graves recorded Black Woman with Sonny Sharrock in the late 1960s and began playing with drummers Andrew Cyrille and Rashied Ali on a series of concerts titled "Dialogue of the Drums." Graves and Cyrille also recorded and released an album without Ali and with the title "Dialogue of the Drums" in 1974. During this time, Graves studied to become a medical technician and managed a lab for a veterinarian. In 1973, Bill Dixon helped secure Graves a teaching position at Bennington College, where Graves taught until 2012. (Dixon had previously brought Jimmy Lyons, Jimmy Garrison, Alan Shorter, and Alan Silva to Bennington.) In 1977, Graves released two albums under his own name: Bäbi, which featured reed players Arthur Doyle and Hugh Glover, and Meditation Among Us, with a Japanese jazz quartet composed of Kaoru Abe, Toshinori Kondo, Mototeru Takagi, and Toshiyuki Tsuchitori. During the early 1980s, Graves also began working with dancer Min Tanaka.

=== Later ===
In the years that followed, Graves toured and recorded in a quartet setting with drummers Cyrille, Kenny Clarke, and Famoudou Don Moye, recorded a duo album with David Murray, and performed and recorded with the New York Art Quartet in celebration of their 35th anniversary. He also recorded two solo albums, Grand Unification (1998) and Stories (2000), as well as albums with John Zorn, Anthony Braxton, William Parker, and Bill Laswell. In 2008 and 2012, Graves performed with Lou Reed. In 2017, Graves played on Sam Amidon's album The Following Mountain. 2018 saw Graves performing with bassist Shahzad Ismaily, as well as the release of the documentary Milford Graves Full Mantis, directed by Graves's former student, Jake Meginsky, along with Neil Cloaca Young. In 2019, Graves played in a duo setting with pianist Jason Moran. Alice in Chains vocalist William DuVall also directed a documentary about Graves titled Ancient to Future: The Wisdom of Milford Graves. However, the film has been in post-production status since 2013 and has not been released as of 2020.

In 2022, Black Editions Group announced that their Black Editions Archive imprint would focus on releasing previously unheard recordings by Graves.

== Illness and death ==
Graves was diagnosed with amyloid cardiomyopathy in 2018, and was informed he had half a year more to live. He died on February 12, 2021. He was 79, and suffered from congestive heart failure prior to his death.

== Honors, awards, distinctions ==
Graves was awarded a Guggenheim Fellowship in Music Composition in 2000, and in 2015 he received a Doris Duke Foundation Impact Award.

== Musical style ==
Graves, along with Sunny Murray and Rashied Ali, was one of the first jazz musicians to free the drums from their traditional time-keeping role, having developed "a conception of... music that went beyond jazz and the ching-a-ding of the ride cymbal." Val Wilmer described Graves as

...a percussionist with an amazing technique. Graves moved around his drumset with astonishing speed, beating rapid two-handed tattoos on every surface. Each stroke was clearly defined so that there were no rolls in the conventional sense; the emphasis was on clarity. He used his cymbals in the way another drummer might use a gong or another drum. With the NYAQ, Graves's snare drum was tuned high as was the norm, but already his tom-toms were producing a deeper sound than usual. By the end of the 'sixties, though, he had dispensed with the snare and his three tom-toms were tuned as loosely as is common in rock today... Graves was probably the first American drummer to remove all of his bottom heads because of their tendency to absorb sound.

Wilmer also wrote:

His bass drum... is in frequent use, and he habitually holds his sticks by the tip... Graves was using matched grip before it became fashionable, and he has another unique grip which enables him to hold two sticks and play on two surfaces virtually simultaneously. Sometimes he holds a huge mallet or maracas in the same hand as a regular drumstick, beating with this combination on the same surface or switching alternately from one beater to the other. He occasionally takes a small pair of tuned bongoes, places them in front of him on the skin of one tom-tom and hits them in that position. The result is a percussive maelstrom of multi-layered intensity.

John Szwed wrote that Graves "did not use a standard drum setup and sometimes hit the bass drum with a stick or kicked it instead of using a pedal, or he played the snare with a tree branch with the leaves still intact."

Graves believed that "most drummers are over-occupied with the playing of rhythms and insufficiently with the actual sound," and that it is "important for drummers to study the actual membrane, to try for different sounds or a different feeling by playing on every part of the skin and not merely the same area over and over again..." He stated that "[i]f you know how to manipulate your skins, you can make that dispersed sound - slides, portamento style, sustained tone. Instead of letting your stick free rebound, you can mute it, slide it on there. It calls for greater physicality." Graves told Aakash Mittal: "when I play, I do more than vertical strokes. I'm not just bah-bop bah-bop. My thing is moving around, touching the skins, knowing about momentum and position at the same time." In an interview with Paul Burwell, Graves stated: "I relate the drum skin to a body of water... As a musician, you are schooling yourself to deal with some of the most sensitive things in the universe: emotion, frequency, life, the vital force... we're involved with one of the most subtle things in life. Sounds - that's it!"

Graves was also very outspoken about his feelings concerning the role of the drummer: "I couldn't understand how a guy would sit and play a basic beat all the time. In African drumming, the drum is in the forefront. Timekeeping for the drummer? I said no way." He stated: "You just can't stay in the background; that's not the nature of the instrument. Most drummers are so reduced. And one of the most disrespectful things the drummer can encounter is when they put the drums either in the right or left side corner of the stage, or if they put you there, they've got people in front of you." He suggested that drummers not take "a greater or lesser role, but an equal role... Not reducing yourself to the point that you were considered just a drummer, not a musician. I resented that more than anything."

== Non-musical interests ==
Graves pursued a wide variety of non-musical interests. According to Giovanni Russonello, Graves was "a kind of underground thought leader in martial arts, natural healing and cellular biology," preferring to "live in territory that's uncharted, which often means unseen," reflecting what John Corbett called "an axiom of adaptability, a sense that people need to be flexible to deal with new contexts and new challenges." Writing in Artforum, Christoph Cox stated: "Graves has thrown himself into a massive multidisciplinary project that straddles the arts and sciences, traditional healing practices and the frontiers of cardiology and stem-cell research."

Many of Graves' interests revolved around what he called "biological music, a synthesis of the physical and mental, a mind-body deal." One example is "Yara," a form of martial art that Graves, a former Police Athletic League boxing champ, invented in the early 1970s, and that is "spontaneous improvised, and... reacting according to that particular situation," based on "the movements of the Praying Mantis, African ritual dance, and Lindy Hop." (According to Graves, Yara means "nimbleness" in the Yoruba language.) Graves stated that certain aspects of Yara came about as a result of inquiries into the history of martial arts having led him to its roots in nature: "What is martial arts? What's Kung Fu? Where did it come from...? I started reading books on Chinese martial arts, the history of this art... There was many times... when I was reading about this so called grandmaster - he'd be up in the mountains meditating, and he saw this and he saw that. I said, 'wow - I could do the same thing, man. I'll just go out in nature 'cause that's where they got it from...' So I went to the best teacher. I went to the praying mantis himself... It goes back to hanging out with nature." Graves taught Yara at his home for over thirty years, with sparring sessions that were "hours long and full-contact."

Aakash Mittal noted the connections between Graves' martial arts activities and his music, writing: "the kinetic motion of yara can be applied with sticks in hand to a cymbal, creating a sonification of the martial arts form itself." Graves explained: "When I would spar, I'd sing on people! Put them to sleep. Just like on the trap set, one hand goes this way, the other that way. They never knew what was coming..." "I would get down to my drum set and I'd go — ting-raww—frapt! — I would keep that whole flow and go around. If I was doing a sword technique, I would practice my sword stuff and with the strokes like — thwap!... There I would exchange a stick, so if I'm hitting down here — pop! — and hitting the cymbal — shhhap!... I was directing the energy in a very precise, meaningful way, so they helped each other out. I would hit the sound and just get it, make it go like — rat-a-tat-a-rot-a-toko!"

Graves related his martial arts activities to his interest in herbal healing, nutrition, acupuncture, and healing using sound and electrical impulses, stating "When we test the body, or we grab the body, and hit certain points and grab certain points, you're not doing a destructive touch... You're a healing martial artist, a constructive martial artist, not a destructive martial artist... You just don't want to be somebody who learns a martial art to go out and be a bully and hurt somebody. I think that's wrong." Graves was "established as both an herbalist and acupuncturist in New York City" and was "frequently sought out as a healer and acupuncturist by neighbors and artists across the city." For years he tended what he called a "global garden," using it as a source of herbal remedies and nutritious foods. Graves recalled that his interest in maintaining a healthy lifestyle arose when, in his late teens, he began experiencing severe health problems as a result of regularly drinking cheap wine. He credited a drastic change in his diet with saving his life: "The plants! The plants! I didn't get into it cause someone said this is something you should do. It wasn't no hip thing, man. It was necessity. It was illness. I became a vegetarian and I started hanging out, listening to the plants."

In the mid-1970s, Graves became fascinated by the notion of "the heartbeat as a primary source of rhythm." He stumbled on a recording of heart rhythms, and "was astonished by the similarities between cardiac arrhythmias and Afro-Cuban drumming patterns. Beyond the simple da-DUM of the heartbeat, he heard polyrhythmic pulsations, variable duration between beats, and a whole spectrum of frequencies. All this strengthened his conviction that true rhythm isn't metronomic and that the tone of the beat is as important as its duration." He purchased equipment and wrote software that allowed him to record and analyze heartbeats, and began studying his own heartbeat rhythms as well as those of friends and other musicians. After decades of study, Graves used some of the funds from his 2000 Guggenheim Fellowship to purchase additional equipment and software. He wrote: "Initially I recorded heartbeats through an electronic stethoscope and listened to the different patterns of those rhythms. More recently, the use of LabVIEW, a software program, has provided much more detailed data. LabVIEW allows me to record the voltages produced by the electrical pulses of the heart, essentially capturing the frequency at which the heart vibrates. These frequencies can then be translated into the audible spectrum and analyzed as sound (heart music), which is accomplished by using specific algorithms written for LabVIEW." By playing the resulting sounds back to a person who acted as a source, Graves "found he can increase blood flow and possibly even stimulate cell growth." He wrote that this research "has inspired a number of medical studies, including a collaboration with researcher Carlo Ventura which showed that exposure to the heart music caused unassigned stem cells to develop into myocardial (heart) cells." The work also resulted in a patent entitled "Method and device for preparing non-embryonic stem cells." Dr. Baruch Krauss, who teaches at Harvard Medical School, is a physician at Boston Children's Hospital, and who studied acupuncture with Graves and followed his research, has described Graves as "what a Renaissance man looks like today... Milford is right on the cutting edge of this stuff. He brings to it what doctors can't, because he approaches it as a musician."

John Corbett wrote that "Graves's heart studies... confirm the falsity of one of the easiest potshots taken at nonmetrical or polymetrical drumming in free jazz, namely, that it's unnatural and doesn't mimic the heart, which is assumed to have a steady beat." Graves stated that regular rhythms are "not natural. You have to go against all the rules of nature, use a metronome, inhibit your true ability to sense the rhythms and vibrations of nature. In a pure metric sense, that means that your inhalation and exhalation would always be the same, because when you inhale your beats per minute increases. If you exhale, it decreases. No one breathes that way. Breath varies, so cardiac rhythm never has that tempo. It's always changing." He also stated: "We are simply not making music that is up to our potential. The complexities you can hear in the sounds of one person's heartbeat are very similar to free jazz and if we were to make music that was in tune with the vibrations of our bodies, the results would be very powerful."

Graves also painted artwork for some of his albums, and later exhibited sculptures which tie together his interests in music and martial arts, writing: "I've been thinking about sculpture as a teaching tool. There's a saying I used to always hear: 'sculpture is frozen music.' I want something with some kind of movement to it. I'm adding elements that are not static, like transducers. I also use my years and years of experience in music and my training in martial arts to understand sculpture. There were movements I used to do that would be very quiet, maybe something from aikido or tai chi. Very slow, very slow... then all of a sudden you would burst out with this explosive, passive-aggressive energy. I wondered how I would put that into a piece of sculpture. I thought the explosion would be to put together some unorthodox elements and have contradictions set in. If a person were to look at it, it would provoke a kind of psychological motion inside of them." Graves' 2017 exhibit at The Artist's Institute at Hunter College tied together his interests in music and acupuncture, "establishing an energetic connection between music and the natural rhythms of the body." A 2020-2021 exhibit at the Institute of Contemporary Art in Philadelphia, Pennsylvania, entitled Milford Graves: A Mind-Body Deal showcased "a collection of Graves' hand-painted album covers and posters, idiosyncratic drum sets, multimedia sculptures, photographs, and costumes, with elements from his home, scientific studies, recording ephemera, and archival recordings, as well as space for performance and a reading room."

== Discography ==
=== As leader ===
- 1965: Percussion Ensemble (ESP) with Sunny Morgan
- 1977: Bäbi (IPS, reissued on Corbett Vs. Dempsey) with Arthur Doyle, Hugh Glover
- 1977: Meditation Among Us (Kitty) with Kaoru Abe, Toshinori Kondo, Mototeru Takagi, and Toshiyuki Tsuchitori
- 1998: Grand Unification (Tzadik)
- 2000: Stories (Tzadik)
- 2023: Children of the Forest (Black Editions Archive) with Arthur Doyle, Hugh Glover

=== As sideman or co-leader ===
With Marshall Allen, Roscoe Mitchell, and Scott Robinson

- Flow States (ScienSonic, 2020)

With Sam Amidon

- The Following Mountain (Nonesuch Records, 2017)

With Albert Ayler

- Holy Ghost: Rare & Unissued Recordings (1962–70) (Revenant, rel. 2004)
- Love Cry (Impulse!, 1968)

With Paul Bley

- Barrage (ESP, rel. 1965)

With Anthony Braxton & William Parker

- Beyond Quantum (Tzadik, 2008)

With Peter Brötzmann and William Parker

- Historic Music Past Tense Future (Black Editions, 2022)

With Kenny Clarke/Andrew Cyrille/Famoudou Don Moye

- Pieces of Time (Soul Note, rel. 1984)

With Andrew Cyrille

- Dialogue of the Drums (IPS, 1974)

With Lowell Davidson

- Lowell Davidson Trio (ESP, 1965, rel. 1969)

With the Jazz Composer's Orchestra

- Communication (Fontana, 1965)

With Bill Laswell

- Space/Time – Redemption (TUM Records, 2014)
- The Stone (Back In No Time) (M.O.D. Technologies, 2014)

With Giuseppi Logan

- The Giuseppi Logan Quartet (ESP, 1965)
- More (ESP, 1966)

With Miriam Makeba

- Makeba Sings! (RCA, 1965)

with Montego Joe

- Arriba! (Prestige, 1964)
- Wild & Warm (Prestige, 1965)

with Jason Moran

- Live at Big Ears (Yes Records, 2021)

With David Murray

- Real Deal (DIW)

With New York Art Quartet

- New York Art Quartet (ESP)
- Mohawk (Fontana)
- 35th Reunion (DIW)
- Call It Art (Triple Point Records)

With Don Pullen

- At Yale University (SRP)
- Nommo (SRP)

With Sonny Sharrock

- Black Woman (Vortex)

With Wadada Leo Smith

- Sacred Ceremonies (Tum, 2021)

With Sun Ra

- Untitled Recordings (Transparency)

With Various Artists

- New American Music Volume 1: New York Section / Composers of the 1970's (Folkways)

With John Zorn

- 50th Birthday Celebration Volume 2 (Tzadik)

== Filmography ==
- The Breath Courses Through Us (2013) by Alan Roth
- River of Fundament (2014) by Matthew Barney
- Milford Graves Full Mantis (2018) by Jake Meginsky

== Bibliography ==
- Graves, Milford and Pullen, Don. (January 1967) "Black Music." In Liberator, 20.
- Graves, Milford. (1968) "Untitled." In The Cricket Vol. 1, 14–17.
- Graves, Milford. (1969) "Music Workshop." In The Cricket Vol. 3, 17–19.
- Graves, Milford. (1969) "Black Music: New Revolutionary Art." In Black Arts: An Anthology of Black Creations ed. Ahmed Alhamisi, 40–41. Detroit, Black Arts Publications.
- Graves, Milford. (2007) "Book of Tono-Rhythmology." In Arcana II: Musicians on Music ed. John Zorn, 110–117. New York, Hips Road. ISBN 9780978833763
- Graves, Milford. (2010) "Music Extensions of Infinite Dimensions." In Arcana V: Music, Magic and Mysticism ed. John Zorn, 171–186. New York, Hips Road. ISBN 9780978833794
