= The Complete Yale Concert, 1966 =

Live album by Milford Graves and Don Pullen
- Released: 2020
- Recorded: April 30, 1966
- Venue: Yale University, New Haven, Connecticut
- Genre: Free jazz
- Label: Corbett vs. Dempsey; CD075
- Producer: John Corbett

An original cover of In Concert at Yale University

The Complete Yale Concert, 1966 is a live album by drummer Milford Graves and pianist Don Pullen. It was recorded in April 1966 at Yale University in New Haven, Connecticut, and was released in 2020 by Corbett vs. Dempsey. The music was initially issued on two LPs: In Concert at Yale University (1966) and Nommo (In Concert at Yale University Vol. 2) (1967), both released by the musicians on their SRP label.

== Background ==
The Yale concert came about when Graves was asked to present a solo recital, and invited Pullen to join him. The event was a success, and the musicians decided to invest the proceeds from the concert in the production of an LP, titled In Concert at Yale University. Together, they formed SRP (variously referred to as Self-Reliance Program, Self-Reliance Project, or Self-Reliance Productions) Records for the purpose of releasing the music, and had a thousand LPs printed, selling them in person and via mail order with hand-painted covers. Following the release, Amiri Baraka (then known as LeRoi Jones) published a positive review in DownBeat in which he provided the musicians' mailing address, resulting in orders flowing in from across the world. Three additional tracks from the Yale concert were released in 1967 with the title Nommo (In Concert at Yale University Vol. 2). Given their limited distribution and unique packaging, both LPs quickly became difficult to find and highly prized.

In 2020, the Corbett vs. Dempsey label, under license from Graves, released The Complete Yale Concert, 1966, bringing together the contents of both LPs on a single CD. Given that the master tapes for both albums had been lost, the tracks were transferred from mint-quality LPs and subjected to noise reduction. The release includes reproductions of the original hand-painted covers, along with photos and an interview with Graves.

In a 1967 article for Liberator, Graves and Pullen delineated their goals in establishing their own record company, writing of "a music free of Western tradition," and stating: "The first Black men were not slaves to the thought of Europeans... They produced from their own natural mental-physical energy and power. Self-reliance... is a recovery, a re-emergence of this energy and power. It is a confidence in the Black mind and wisdom which does not have to meet the approval or sanction of the West." In a 1969 interview, Graves spoke of SRP as "a collective thing where we record ourselves, and we do all the distribution... that will stop us from going downtown depending on RCA and Columbia and those companies." Baraka praised this outlook, writing: "Do it yourself, brother. Not brother can you spare a 10 percent." Val Wilmer wrote: "Graves and Pullen were the first musicians to handle every facet of production themselves – transportation, contracts, invoicing, and so on."

== Reception ==
In his 1967 DownBeat review of the initial SRP release, Amiri Baraka wrote: "The music is beautiful on this album... These two players... are making some of the deepest music anywhere. It wants nothing."

Peter Margasak included the album in his list of "Favorite Albums of 2020," and wrote: "Essential coupling of two insanely rare duo albums from a 1966 concert at Yale University: Pullen at his most ferocious and probing, Graves making a huge step in establishing his radical approach to polymetric movement."

In a review for Point of Departure, John Sharpe commented: "The five pieces represent a true dialogue... Although intensity levels vary, the exchanges remain resolutely non-melodic and non-metric throughout... Even after all this time the music still challenges preconceptions. It remains a classic of the genre and deserves to be widely heard."

Thurston Moore included Nommo in his "Top Ten From The Free Jazz Underground" list, first published in 1995 in the second issue of the defunct Grand Royal Magazine, calling the interplay between the musicians "remarkable."

== Track listing ==
1. "P.G. I" – 18:52
2. "P.G. II" – 22:53
3. "P.G. III" – 8:03
4. "P.G. IV" – 7:54
5. "P.G. V" – 15:38
- Tracks 1 and 2 originally issued on In Concert at Yale University (SRP, 1966). Tracks 3–5 originally issued on Nommo (In Concert at Yale University Vol. 2) (SRP, 1967).

== Personnel ==
- Milford Graves – drums, percussion
- Don Pullen – piano
