= The Stone (Milford Graves and Bill Laswell album) =

Live album by Milford Graves and Bill Laswell
- Released: 2014
- Recorded: April 22, 2014
- Venue: The Stone, New York City
- Genre: Free jazz
- Length: 40:40
- Label: M.O.D. Technologies; MODDS00001
- Producer: Bill Laswell

The Stone is a live album by drummer Milford Graves and bassist Bill Laswell. It was recorded on April 22, 2014, at The Stone in New York City, and was released later that year by M.O.D. Technologies. The album is the duo's second recording, the first being Space/Time – Redemption, recorded in 2013.

When asked to describe the experience of playing with Laswell as a rhythm section without a "horn out front," Graves responded: "I guess it's according to what kind of tradition you’re coming from... So-called Western culture, they changed the hierarchy of instrumentation... Some people may think they have to make adjustments, if that's what they came from, a so-called Western concept, where drums are in the background." Graves continued: "with this particular situation with Bill and myself... our understanding exceeds a single concept of how to play music. So that way, you can have more to say on the instrument, than if you're just playing one particular style of music... So bass and drums? No problem. As long as the bass player's right, as long as he can stretch."

== Reception ==
In an article for All About Jazz, Karl Ackermann wrote: "A synergy developed and morphed into a sound that simmered below the surface and then exploded into unique expressions. The scale of their shared ideas is incomparable, dense, and cutting."

Writer Joel Gausten commented: "Although the song's unstructured nature... might be too much for some ears, those who stick around for the ride will be rewarded with a recording that offers new things to uncover with every listen."

Albert Gomez, in an article for Al Día, stated that Graves "showed that he had polished the technique so much... that, certainly, the record sounds like the meditations of a shaman fully connected to the earth through rhythms and psychedelia... The most intense African and Afro-Cuban influence explodes into jazz warping space-time at the end of his career."

Writing for Between Sound and Space, Tyran Grillo remarked: "The actions of this duo are kinetic and headstrong. Like muscles of the throat, they twitch in anticipation of speech. Only words never materialize. Graves is, nevertheless, quite vocal at peaks of expression. His hi-hat is the measure of a defibrillating heart, around which sticks converge like bones. The mounting corporeality of his playing underscores the circularity of this meeting. Laswell rides the wave, respectfully and patiently, before chorusing his approval through improvisation."

== Track listing ==
1. "Back In No Time" – 40:40

== Personnel ==
- Milford Graves – drums, percussion
- Bill Laswell – bass
