= Beyond Quantum =

Studio album by Anthony Braxton, Milford Graves & William Parker
- Released: 2008
- Recorded: May 11, 2008
- Genre: Jazz
- Length: 63:30
- Label: Tzadik
- Producer: Bill Laswell

Anthony Braxton chronology
Toronto (Duets) 2007 (2007)	Beyond Quantum (2008)	Duets (Pittsburgh) 2008 (2008)

William Parker chronology
Petit Oiseau (2007)	Beyond Quantum (2008)	At Somewhere There (2008)

Beyond Quantum is an album by American saxophonist Anthony Braxton, percussionist Milford Graves, and bassist William Parker recorded in 2008 for the Tzadik label.

== Reception ==
Professional ratings
Review scores
Source	Rating
Allmusic	4.5/5 stars
All About Jazz	4.5/5 stars

The Allmusic review by Thom Jurek awarded the album 4½ stars stating "If ever a recording needed to be trumpeted from the rooftops, it's this one... Though it's over an hour, Beyond Quantum is over all too quickly. It never once feels like an endurance test, and the flood of creativity, passion, and direct communication between participants leaves the listener not breathless, but astonished. This is a serious contender for vanguard jazz recording of 2008".

Writing for All About Jazz, Troy Collins called the album "an unprecedented free jazz summit meeting of the highest order", and commented: "The trio operates as a true collective over the course of five lengthy excursions that explore a wide-range of shifting dynamics. Their relentless three-way dialog is a constant evolution of balanced, empathetic interplay... All-star free jazz sessions often sound better in theory than they do in execution; this meeting however, sounds timeless. Beyond Quantum is an unexpected and magical recording, a classic destined to top many year end lists."

Reviewer Jeff Stockton remarked: "Leave it to downtown impresario and producer John Zorn to bring together Braxton..., William Parker... and Milford Graves... for as close to an allstar power trio as jazz fans can get. Braxton moves effortlessly from horn to horn, Graves boils with creative energy (interjecting his patented vocalizing in one spot) and Parker ties it all together with iron pizzicato playing and well-placed arco work throughout the five 'meetings' that form Beyond Quantum. Zorn, along with co-producer Bill Laswell, may have delivered the CD of the year: 60 minutes of seamless, hard-hitting supergroup improv from three masters."

== Track listing ==
All compositions by Anthony Braxton, Milford Graves & William Parker

1. "First Meeting" – 14:49
2. "Second Meeting" – 10:48
3. "Third Meeting" – 16:34
4. "Fourth Meeting" – 16:08
5. "Fifth Meeting" – 5:10
- Recorded at Orange Music Sound Studio in West Orange, New Jersey on May 11, 2008

== Personnel ==
- Anthony Braxton – saxophones
- William Parker – bass, double reed
- Milford Graves – percussion
