= Stories (Milford Graves album) =

Studio album by Milford Graves
- Released: 2000
- Recorded: June 25, 2000
- Studio: Avatar (New York, New York)
- Genre: jazz, percussion music
- Length: 1:01:45
- Label: Tzadik Records; TZ 7062
- Producer: Milford Graves

Milford Graves chronology
| Grand Unification (1998) | Stories (2000) | Children of the Forest (2023) |

Stories is an album by American percussionist Milford Graves, recorded in June 2000 and released later that year by Tzadik Records.

== Reception ==
Professional ratings
Review scores
| Source | Rating |
|---|---|
| AllMusic | 4.5/5 stars |
| The Penguin Guide to Jazz | 3.5/4 stars |

In a review for AllMusic, François Couture wrote: "Milford Graves is a fantastic drummer for whom the simple act of hitting a drum calls for his whole body and mind to take over. He lives, thinks, and expresses himself through his contact with resounding objects. All he needed was an album that would do justice to his art. He had come close to it in 1998 with Grand Unification, his first solo CD for John Zorn's Tzadik label. With Stories, he might have recorded the best solo percussion album ever. On this playground, there are no limits to what Graves can do, but no artifices to alter the sound. The recording quality is incredible, better than on the previous album. Nothing is lost in the mix; everything comes through pure and lively. This is the first time Graves has been recorded so faithfully. The performances themselves also belong to the man's best work... Traditional music categories like 'world music,' 'jazz,' or even 'avant-garde' crumble miserably into dust as Graves pours his heart and soul into his playing, proving that all music is contained in the art of percussion. Very strongly recommended to anyone interested in percussion or simply wanting to hear what 'totally uninhibited expression' really means."

The authors of The Penguin Guide to Jazz called "Evolving Pathways" "one of the most powerful statements the drummer has yet to make on record," and commented: "he seems beyond genre, working in an area that transcends jazz percussion. Again, he chants, murmurs spells and moves between a bewildering array of percussion instruments... Graves has at last created a work the equal of his colossal talent."

Writing for One Final Note, Derek Taylor remarked: "the degree to which the drummer's unique and total embrace of his instruments has remained consistent and beyond the reach of corruption is one of the immediately discernable and truly enlightening facets of this newly conceived chapter... Graves is a botanist, an herbalist and an acupuncturist. While these pursuits may color his musical endeavors, he is a drummer first and foremost in the minds of many listeners and Stories makes both his reach and his influence in this realm abundantly apparent."

== Track listing ==
All compositions by Milford Graves.

1. "Optical Inversions" - 5:15
2. "Speaking To The Spoken" - 6:34
3. "Changeable Changes" - 7:44
4. "Territorial Moods" - 3:39
5. "Continuous Conversations" - 6:35
6. "Evolving Pathways" - 31:56
- Recorded on June 25, 2000, at Avatar Studio, New York City.

== Personnel ==
- Milford Graves – drums, percussion, voice

== Production ==
- Milford Graves – producer
- John Zorn – executive producer
- Jim Anderson – engineer
