= Black & Black =

Studio album by David Murray
- Released: 1991
- Recorded: October 7, 1991
- Genre: Jazz
- Length: 55:50
- Label: Red Baron
- Producer: Bob Thiele

David Murray chronology
David Murray/James Newton Quintet (1991)	Black & Black (1991)	Fast Life (1991)

Black & Black is an album by the American musician David Murray, released in 1991. It features performances by Murray, Marcus Belgrave, Kirk Lightsey, Santi Debriano and Roy Haynes. The album was produced by Bob Thiele.

== Reception ==
The AllMusic review by Scott Yanow stated: "Not essential but worth picking up by David Murray fans."

Professional ratings
Review scores
Source	Rating
AllMusic	4/5 stars

== Track listing ==
1. "Anti-Calypso" (Prince) - 10:08
2. "Duke's Place" (Ellington, Thiele, Roberts, Bill Katz) - 11:05
3. "Cool" (Osser, Thiele) - 11:21
4. "Black and Black" (Osser, Thiele) - 10:48
5. "Head Out" (Murray) - 12:44

== Personnel ==
- David Murray – tenor saxophone
- Marcus Belgrave – trumpet
- Kirk Lightsey – piano
- Santi Debriano – bass
- Roy Haynes – drums
