= Soeda Azenbō =

Japanese singer

- 添田 唖蝉坊
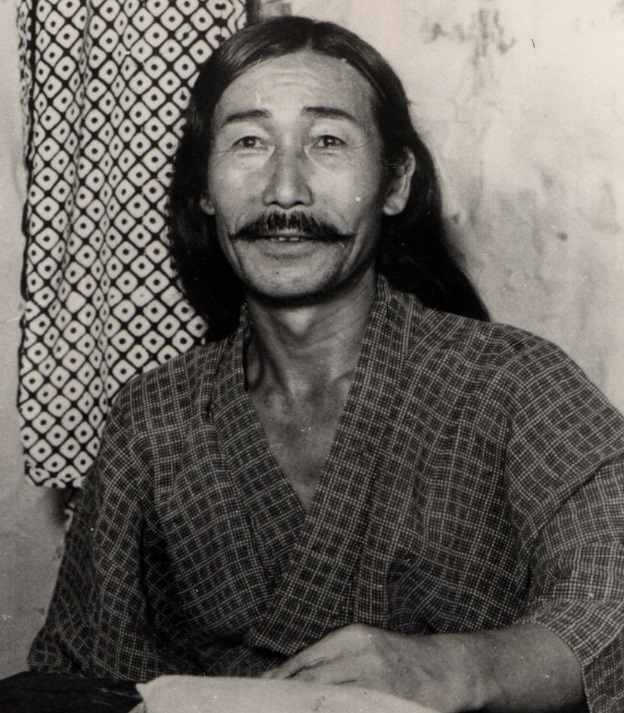
- Born: Soeda Heikichi (添田 平吉); December 25, 1872; Ōiso, Kanagawa Prefecture, Empire of Japan
- Died: February 8, 1944 (aged 71); Tokyo, Empire of Japan
- Occupation: Musician

Soeda Azenbō (Japanese: 添田 唖蝉坊, romanized: Soeda Azenbō) (1872–1944) was a Japanese singer and lyricist, a prominent figure of the enka style in the Meiji era and later. His son was the author and critic Soeda Tomomichi.

== Selected works ==
- Gunshin Hirose chūsa (軍神広瀬中佐, Commander Hirose, the war-spirit) (1904)
- Ā kane no yo (あゝ金の世, O this world of money) (1906)
- Nogi taishō no uta (乃木大将の歌, Song of General Nogi) (1912)
- Makkuro bushi (真っ黒節, The pitch-black stanzas) (1913)
- Kachūsha no uta (カチューシャの唄, Katyusha's Song) (1914)
- Rōdōmondai no uta (労働問題の歌, Song of the labor problem) (1919)
- Kanekane bushi (金々節, The golden stanzas) (1925)
- Seikatsu sensen ijō ari (生活戦線異状あり, Something wrong on the front lines of life) (1930)
- Susume shintaisei (進め新体制, Advance, New Order) (1940)

== See also ==
- Tsuchitori Toshiyuki
- Tsuda Kōji

== Bibliography ==
- 添田 Soeda, 唖蝉坊 Azenbō; 添田 Soeda, 知道 Tomomichi (1982). 唖蝉坊流生記 Azenbō ryūseiki (1st ed.). Japan: 刀水書房 Tōsui Shobō.
- 添田 Soeda, 唖蝉坊 Azenbō; 添田 Soeda, 知道 Tomomichi (1982). 浅草底流記 Asakusa teiryūki (1st ed.). Japan: 刀水書房 Tōsui Shobō.
- 添田 Soeda, 知道 Tomomichi (1982). 演歌の明治大正史 Enka no Meiji-Taishō shi (1st ed.). Japan: 刀水書房 Tōsui Shobō.
- 添田 Soeda, 知道 Tomomichi (1982). 日本春歌考 Nihon shunka kō (1st ed.). Japan: 刀水書房 Tōsui Shobō.
- 添田 Soeda, 知道 Tomomichi (1984). 空襲下日記 Kūshūka nikki (1st ed.). Japan: 刀水書房 Tōsui Shobō.
