= Bäbi =

Live album by Milford Graves
- Released: 1977
- Recorded: March 20, 1976
- Venues: WBAI-FM/Free Music Store, New York
- Genre: free jazz
- Length: 1:26:58
- Labels: Institute of Percussive Studies; IPS ST004

Milford Graves chronology
Percussion Ensemble (1966)	Bäbi (1977)	Meditation Among Us (1977)

Bäbi is a live album by American percussionist Milford Graves, recorded in March 1976 and released in 1977 by the Institute of Percussive Studies, a label owned and run by Graves and Andrew Cyrille. The album features Graves on drums and percussion, along with reed players Arthur Doyle and Hugh Glover.

The album was reissued in 2018 by Corbett vs. Dempsey. The original tapes of the concert had been lost, so the reissue was remastered directly from vinyl. In the meantime, Graves, while looking through his archives, discovered a tape of the trio dating from 1969. Four tracks from this tape were included in the reissue.

== Reception ==
Writing for The Wire, Alan Licht commented: "After four minutes of relentlessly incendiary fire music the New York audience reacts with a whoop that barely conceals a sharp intake of breath. A spell of incantatory glossolalia from Graves ushers in further strident eruptions from the horns of Hugh Glover and Arthur Doyle. As their wild screeches scorch the air, the drummer keeps step with incandescent gracefulness, cavorting on the rim of the volcano. For all its exhausting ferocity Bäbi is a joyful and involving record, due largely to the headlong inventiveness of Graves. By the mid-1970s fire music had hardened into a style and was lending itself to cliche. Graves and his group restore its suppleness and exhilaration."

In a review for The New York City Jazz Record, Pierre Crépon wrote: "the drums constitute a pulsating center of gravity, flanked by Arthur Doyle and Hugh Glover's reeds... The saxophonists' point of departure is the most paroxysmal part of the free jazz solo, areas of pure sound production uncovered by previous avant garde players, used here as a continuous mode of expression through modulation and repetition. Graves' kit is uniquely configured around removed bottom heads for maximal sound projection and a move away from the snare in favor of heavy tom use. His playing is equally unique, using the freeflowing approach of the avant garde while still sounding extremely rhythmical. Graves also makes frequent use of vocalizations. The notion of 'classic' doesn't have much currency in avant garde jazz, but certain records inherit the status for the unique music they document. With its compact 30 minutes, Bäbi is one of them."

In his book Pick up the Pieces: Excursions in Seventies Music, John Corbett stated: "If... you were... going into cardiac arrest, I think you could confidently use Bäbi as a defibrillator. Milford's playing from the moment it starts... is spectacularly intense. It's a trio with Hugh Glover and Arthur Doyle, saxophonists who blow with unmitigated energy, veritably turning themselves inside out... It is music that has a palpable effect on the listener. It can change your temperature, help with gastrointestinal distress, tune up your nervous system... Imagine all the power necessary to revive a body without a pulse — placing the paddles on the pectorals, no jolt of electricity, instead a blast of 'Bi,' moving the chi around with life — energy force, invoking a kind of subtle body experience that might breathe life back into a corpse straight through all seven chakras at once, the drumming more immediate and affirming and explosive than almost anything you can imagine, rolling and tumbling with a gravitational pull, an interplanetary impulse, satellite motion, all the sensations of the spheres brought to bear on this our fleshy plane. If that track doesn't get your blood flowing, I'm sorry, you’re done for."

Jon Dale, writing for Fact Magazine, called the album "an absolute stunner," and remarked: "this is one of my go-to albums when people ask to hear the most seemingly 'untamed' end of free jazz. I say 'seemingly' because there's a great internal logic to these performances: it takes a good deal of control and power to play with this kind of abandon, a real understanding of and ability to trust in the fundamental spine of the music."

In an article for Artforum, David Grundy called the tracks "extraordinarily joyous, multiphonic squalls, as if every rhythm under the sun were sounding at the same time."

Albert Gomez, in an article for Al Día, called Bäbi "majestic and exquisite," writing: "Sweat, ecstasy, a bubbling, psychedelic human crowd stripping away the first layers of conversations between instruments while the smoke from the venue dries your throat."

In a review for Stereogum, Phil Freeman referred to the album as "one of the all-time free jazz Holy Grails," and wrote: "It's some of the most high-energy, mind-blasting free jazz you'll ever hear; the drummer sometimes abandons his kit in favor of an almost pre-lingual howling and wailing."

== Track listing ==
All compositions by Milford Graves.

=== Original release ===
1. "Bä" - 11:16
2. "Bi" - 3:55
3. "Bäbi" - 15:17
- Recorded on March 20, 1976, at the WBAI-FM/Free Music Store, New York City.

=== Tracks added for 2018 reissue ===
4. "1969 Trio 1" - 28:40
5. "1969 Trio 2" - 12:44
6. "1969 Trio 3" - 8:24
7. "1969 Trio 4" - 6:58
- Recorded on December 14, 1969, in New York City.

== Personnel ==
- Milford Graves – drums, percussion, voice
- Arthur Doyle – reeds
- Hugh Glover – reeds
