= Pieces of Time (album) =

Studio album by Kenny Clarke, Andrew Cyrille, Milford Graves, and Famoudou Don Moye
- Released: 1984
- Recorded: September 16 and 17, 1983
- Studio: Delta Recordings, New York
- Genre: jazz, percussion music
- Length: 33:20
- Label: Soul Note; SN 1078 CD
- Producer: Giovanni Bonandrini

Pieces of Time is an album by jazz drummers Kenny Clarke, Andrew Cyrille, Milford Graves, and Famoudou Don Moye. It was recorded in September 1983, and was released by the Soul Note label in 1984. The album, the catalyst for which was Cyrille, presents compositions by all four musicians, along with four two-minute "personal statements." Liner notes were provided by Max Roach, who wrote: "This idea of four percussionists, using sounds as their premise in creating a work as profound as Pieces of Time, is pure artistic design."

"Laurent," Kenny Clarke's contribution, is dedicated to his son, and is a 32-bar bebop composition in AABA form. "Nibaldi Isle," by Moye, utilizes a variety of bells, shakers, and sound effects, yielding what Cyrille called "almost like a music of tones that would take you to a certain avenue or place. Some kind of place like Polynesia and/or Indonesia..." According to Cyrille, his "No. 11" is based on the fact that he was born in November, the eleventh month, and involves "a nucleus, a motif of.. eleven sounds. And I could play them any way I wanted but it would be eleven sounds orchestrated with eleven attacks." Graves's "Energy Cycles" is a three-part piece with both structured and free-form sections, and features vocalizations by the composer. "Drum Song for Leadbelly," by Cyrille, is an adaptation of a blues song by Huddie Leadbetter, and was also recorded by Cyrille and saxophonist Bill McHenry for their 2016 album Proximity.

== Reception ==
Professional ratings
Review scores
Source	Rating
AllMusic	3/5 stars
The Penguin Guide to Jazz	3.5/4 stars
The Rolling Stone Jazz & Blues Album Guide	4.5/5 stars

Ron Wynn, writing for AllMusic, called it a "standout session."

The authors of The Penguin Guide to Jazz wrote: "Klook was the elder statesman at this astonishing confrontation, and he more or less steals the show with a seemingly effortless display that has the younger guys diving into their bags for ever more exotic wrinkles on the same basic sound. Not to all tastes, perhaps, but an intriguing and historic record nevertheless."

In an article for The New York Times, Robert Palmer noted that Kenny Clarke "didn't stop listening to younger players 20 years ago, unlike many players of his generation. He offers some surprises on this album."

The Washington Post's Mike Joyce commented: "A lot of lip service has been paid to 'jazz tradition' in recent years, but this ensemble represents a veritable jazz continuum... The ensemble pieces... are particularly rewarding. Diverse yet remarkably cohesive, they range from the structured essays by Clarke... and Cyrille... and an emphatic free-form exercise by Graves... to the tropical lushness of Moye's familiar domain... The 'drum dialogues' evolve naturally, and with each hearing new facets of these complex performances are revealed."

== Track listing ==
=== Group performances ===
1. "Laurent" (Clarke) – 3:25
2. "Nibaldi Isle" (Moye) – 10:50
3. "No. 11" (Cyrille) – 7:47
4. "Energy Cycles" (Graves) – 8:46
5. "Drum Song for Leadbelly" (Cyrille) – 2:32

=== Pieces of Time (Personal Statements) ===
6. "By Kenny Clarke" (Clarke) – 2:00
7. "By Milford Graves" (Graves) – 2:00
8. "By Famoudou Don Moye" (Moye) – 2:00
9. "By Andrew Cyrille" (Cyrille) – 2:00
- Recorded September 16 and 17, 1983, at Delta Recordings, New York.

== Personnel ==
- Kenny Clarke – drums, percussion, voice
- Andrew Cyrille – drums, percussion, voice
- Milford Graves – drums, percussion, voice
- Famoudou Don Moye – drums, percussion, voice
