= Katyusha's Song =

1914 song by Nakayama Shimpei

Song
- Written: 1914
- Composer: Shinpei Nakayama
- Lyricist: Soeda Azenbō

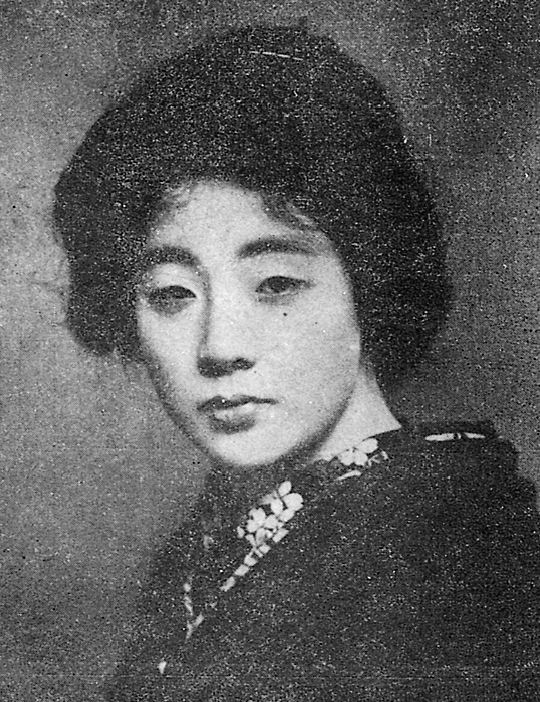
Sumako Matsui

"Katyusha's Song" (カチューシャの唄, Kachūsha no Uta), or "Song of Katyusha", is a Japanese song which was highly popular in early-20th century Japan. It was composed in the major pentatonic scale by Shinpei Nakayama with lyrics by Soeda Azenbō. The song was sung by Sumako Matsui in a dramatization of Leo Tolstoy's 1899 novel Resurrection, first put on stage in the Geijutsuza theatre, Tokyo in 1914.

The same year the Nippon Kinetophone company released a kinetophone record of Matsui Sumako's singing with the same title.

== Influences ==
Katyusha's song became a national hit in Japan from 1913 onwards, selling 27,000 copies and was taken on by street corner musicians throughout Japan. It is considered by some music historians as the first example of modern Japanese popular music.
