= Tsuda Kōji =

Japanese singer-songwriter (1934-2023)

- 津田 耕治

Personal details
- Born: September 17, 1934 Ichinomiya, Aichi Prefecture, Empire of Japan
- Died: April 30, 2023 (aged 88) Kashiwa, Chiba Prefecture, Japan
- Occupation: Musician
- Website: www2.plala.or.jp/yukyoden/

Tsuda Kōji (津田 耕治; 1934-2023) was a Japanese singer-songwriter known for his involvement in modern enka. His first name is sometimes spelled Kōji (耕次).

== Early life ==
Tsuda was born in 1934 in the city of Ichinomiya, Aichi Prefecture under his real name Sakaida Teruyoshi (坂井田 照義). He graduated from the Gifu Technical High School where he was the leader of an ōendan team.

== Music career ==
In Osaka, he studied music under the naniwabushi master Hirosawa Kikuharu II (1914-1964) and thence became involved in enka. Tsuda's style came to be influenced by Kawachi ondo.

In 1967, he performed the eponymous theme song to the yakuza film Kawachi Yūkyōden written by Hoshino Tetsurō. After 1970, Tsuda studied the music of Soeda Azenbō and made a number of his own recordings of Azenbō's songs.

== Death ==
Tsuda died of malignant lymphoma on April 30, 2023.

== Selected works ==
- Vicissitudes - A Chivalrous Heart of Tsuda Kōji (流転・A CHIVALROUS HEART OF TSUDA KOJI) (1970, LP, Crown Records GW-6023)
- Azenbō's World (AZENBOの世界) (1979, LP, Crown Records GWA-33)
- Lyrical Travelogue of the Enka Life (演歌人生うた紀行) (1997, CD, Crown Records CRCN-48501)
