= Masahiko Togashi =

- Born: March 22, 1940; Tokyo, Japan
- Died: August 22, 2007 (aged 67) Kanagawa, Japan
- Genres: Jazz
- Occupations: Musician, composer
- Instrument: Percussion
- Years active: 1954–1969, 1973-2002

Masahiko Togashi (富樫 雅彦, Togashi Masahiko; 22 March 1940 in Tokyo – 22 August 2007 in Kanagawa) was a Japanese jazz percussionist and composer.

Togashi grew up in a musical household; his father was a double-bassist in a swing jazz ensemble, and Togashi learned violin and drums, playing the latter in his father's band. He worked with Sadao Watanabe, Toshiko Akiyoshi, and Tony Scott in the 1950s, then founded the ensemble Jazz Academy in 1961 with Hideto Kanai, Masabumi Kikuchi, and Masayuki Takayanagi. Togashi was an early free jazz leader in Japan: his 1965 quartet with Kazunori Takeda, Yosuke Yamashita and Kuniro Takimoto used words as triggers for each player to perform his thoughts about that word. Togashi and Yamashita were part of Watanabe's band in 1966, but Yamashita and Togashi disagreed about rhythms, leading to the pianist leaving. Togashi also performed with American musicians such as Ornette Coleman, Blue Mitchell, Lee Morgan, and Sonny Rollins on Japanese tours. Early in 1969, Togashi and Hiroshi Suzuki co-led a quintet that recorded the album Variation. Another Togashi album from the same year – the quartet We Now Create – was described by critic Teruto Soejima as "a masterpiece of four individuals intensely exploring the true natures of their instruments". Late that year, he recorded duets with Mototeru Takagi for the soundtrack to the experimental film A.K.A. Serial Killer. An edited version of the soundtrack was released as Isolation by Columbia Records.

Togashi permanently lost the use of his legs in an accident in 1970 and played only percussion until the mid-1970s when he resumed on drums. Later associations included performing or recording with Paul Bley, Don Cherry, Jack DeJohnette, Charlie Haden, Steve Lacy, Gary Peacock, Masahiko Sato, and Yuji Takahashi.

== Discography ==
=== As leader/co-leader ===
- Variation (Takt, 1969)
- We Now Create (Victor, 1969)
- Canto of Aries with New Herd (Columbia, 1971)
- Isolation with Mototeru Takagi (Columbia, 1971) - recorded 1969
- Poesy : The Man Who Keeps Washing His Hands with Masabumi Kikuchi, Gary Peacock (Philips, 1971)
- Ginparis Session (銀巴里セッション) with Masayuki Takayanagi (TBM, 1972) - recorded 1963
- Sohsyoh (双晶) with Masahiko Satoh (Trio, 1973)
- Song for Myself with Sadao Watanabe, Masahiko Satoh, Masabumi Kikuchi (East Wind, 1974)
- Spiritual Nature (East Wind, 1975)
- Guild For Human Music (Denon Jazz, 1976)
- Rings (East Wind, 1976) - solo
- Session In Paris, Vol. 1 "Song Of Soil" (Paddle Wheel, 1979)
- Kizashi (兆) with Yosuke Yamashita (Next Wave, 1980)
- Valencia with Takashi Kako (Trio, 1980)
- Tidal Wave (津波) with Richard Beirach (Trio, 1980)
- The face of percussion (Paddle Wheel, 1981) - recorded 1980
- The Ballad My Favorite (Paddle Wheel, 1981)
- Spiritual Moments (Paddle Wheel, 1982)
- Contrastwith Lauren Newton and Peter Kowald (Paddle Wheel, 1983)
- Eternal duo with Steve Lacy (Paddle Wheel, 1983) - recorded 1981, CD version (DIW, 2015)
- Pulsation with Masayuki Takayanagi (Paddle Wheel, 1983)
- Breath with Hozan Yamamoto, Yōsuke Yamashita (Denon, 1984)
- Ayers Rock with Richie Beirach, Terumasa Hino (Polydor, 1985)
- Bura Bura (Pan Music, 1986) - live
- Scene (Cornelius, 1987)
- Place - Space Who (Egg Farm, 1987)
- Wave with Gary Peacock and Masahiko Satoh (East Wind, 1987)
- Wave II with Gary Peacock and Masahiko Satoh (East Wind, 1988)
- Wave III with Gary Peacock and Masahiko Satoh (NEC Avenue, 1988)
- Essence of Jazz (Art Union, 1990)
- Senza Tempo with Haruna Miyake, Yuji Takahashi, Jean-François and Jenny-Clark (Egg Farm, 1990)
- Concerto with Masabumi Kikuchi (Ninety-One, 1991)
- Twilight with Steve Lacy (Ninety-One, 1992) - recorded 1991
- Passing in the silence (AMJ, 1993) - solo
- Triple Helix with Terumasa Hino, Masabumi Kikuchi (Enja, 1993)
- Richard Beirach - Terumasa Hino - Masahiko Togashi (Konnex, 1993)
- Eternal Duo ’95 with Steve Lacy (Take One, 1996) - recorded 1995
- Inter-Action: Live At Hall Egg Farm On December 9, 1995 (Take One, 1996) - recorded 1995
- Update: Live At Pit Inn Shinjuku On December 16, 1995 (Take One, 1996) - recorded 1995
- Asian Spirits with Kang Tae Hwan and Masahiko Satoh (AD.forte, 1996)
- Moment Aug,15 (BAJ Records, 1997)
- Freedom Joy with Richie Beirach (Trial, 1998) - recorded 1997
- Live at Dolphy (Trial, 1998)
- Passing In The Silence (Transheart, 2000)
- Contrast with Masahiko Satoh (EWE, 2002)
- Live at Köln (JamRice, 2004) - recorded 2002
- Inductions with Masahiko Satoh (BAJ, 2009)
