= Fast Life (David Murray album) =

Studio album by David Murray Quartet + 1
- Released: 1992
- Recorded: October 16–17, 1991
- Genre: Jazz
- Length: 60:43
- Label: DIW/Columbia
- Producer: Kazunori Sugiyama

David Murray Quartet + 1 chronology
| Black & Black (1991) | Fast Life (1992) | Real Deal (1992) |

Fast Life is an album by American jazz saxophonist David Murray released in Japan on DIW Records in 1992. It was reissued in the US by Columbia in 1993. It features four quartet performances by Murray with John Hicks, Ray Drummond, and Idris Muhammad and two tracks with saxophonist Branford Marsalis guesting.

== Critical reception ==
The AllMusic review by Scott Yanow awarded the album 2 stars stating "This CD is a bit of a mixed bag. The great tenor David Murray is joined by pianist John Hicks, bassist Ray Drummond and drummer Idris Muhammad and is heard at his best on two relatively straight-ahead pieces, 'Luminous' and 'Off Season.' But Branford Marsalis guests on two other selections, and those are much more erratic, with rambling solos by the two tenors and a lot of aimless high energy. Wrapping up this set are a calypso and the lightweight 'Intuitively,' making the net results less than one might hope."

Professional ratings
Review scores
| Source | Rating |
|---|---|
| AllMusic | 2/5 stars |

== Track listing ==
1. "Crucificado" (Dave Burrell) – 10:41
2. "Calle Estrella" (Wayne Francis) – 7:06
3. "Fast Life" – 12:04
4. "Luminous" (Elise Wood) – 10:31
5. "Intuitively" (Burrell, Monika Larsson) – 8:57
6. "Off Season" – 11:24

All compositions by David Murray except as indicated

  - Recorded October 16 & 17, 1991, Power Station, NYC

== Personnel ==
- David Murray – tenor saxophone
- John Hicks – piano
- Ray Drummond – bass
- Idris Muhammad – drums
- Branford Marsalis – tenor saxophone (tracks 1 & 3)
