= David Murray/James Newton Quintet =

Studio album by David Murray
- Released: 1996
- Recorded: August 19–20, 1991
- Genre: Jazz
- Length: 54:59
- Label: DIW
- Producer: Kazunori Sugiyama

David Murray chronology
| The Jazzpar Prize (1992) | David Murray/James Newton Quintet (1996) | Black & Black (1991) |

David Murray/James Newton Quintet is an album by David Murray and James Newton released on the Japanese DIW label in 1996. It features seven quintet performances by Murray and Newton with John Hicks, Fred Hopkins, Billy Hart and Andrew Cyrille.

== Reception ==
The Allmusic review awarded the album 4 stars.

Professional ratings
Review scores
| Source | Rating |
|---|---|
| Allmusic | 4/5 stars |

== Track listing ==
1. "Valerie" (Newton) - 7:20
2. "Moon Over Sand II" (Cyrille) - 5:34
3. "Muhammad Ali" - 7:44
4. "Inbetwinxt" (Newton) - 12:15
5. "Akhenaten" (Murray, Newton) - 4:23
6. "Blues In The Pocket" (Hicks) - 7:02
7. "Doni's Song" - 10:45

All compositions by David Murray except as indicated
Recorded August 19 & 20, 1991 at Sound on Sound, NYC

== Personnel ==
- David Murray - tenor saxophone, bass clarinet
- James Newton - flute
- John Hicks - piano
- Fred Hopkins - bass
- Andrew Cyrille - drums (all tracks but "Valerie")
- Billy Hart - drums (on "Valerie" only)
