= Kaoru Abe =

Japanese free jazz saxophonist (1949–1978)

Kaoru Abe 阿部 薫
- Born: May 3, 1949; Kawasaki, Kanagawa, Japan
- Died: September 9, 1978 (aged 29) Nakano, Tokyo, Japan
- Genres: Free jazz, avant-garde
- Occupation: Musician
- Instruments: Saxophone, Bass Clarinet, Harmonica, Guitar
- Label: DIW

Kaoru Abe (阿部 薫, Abe Kaoru) (May 3, 1949 – September 9, 1978) was a Japanese avant-garde alto saxophonist. Self-taught at a young age, Abe performed with notables such as Motoharu Yoshizawa, Takehisa Kosugi, Yosuke Yamashita, Derek Bailey, and Milford Graves, although he generally performed solo. He was married to the author Izumi Suzuki, and was a nephew of singer Kyu Sakamoto. He was portrayed in Kōji Wakamatsu's film Endless Waltz by novelist and punk rock singer Kō Machida.

== Personal life ==
Abe dropped out of high school in 1967, at 17 years of age, to focus on perfecting his playing, and in 1968, he did his first performance, at a jazz spot named Oleo in Kawasaki. In 1970, he met Masayuki Takayanagi. in 1971, he met Izumi Suzuki, and in 1973, they married. In 1976, they had a daughter. However, in 1977, they divorced.

== Career ==
Abe was prolific, appearing almost every day at jazz spots and concerts. His library consists almost entirely of archival and live recordings, however he did record in a studio, notably on the 1977 album Meditation Among Us led by drummer Milford Graves.

In his later years, Abe would begin playing different instruments. In 1976-1978 to be specific, were his years of most exploration. However, there were instances of him playing harmonica in 1970-1971. He also played bass clarinet all the way throughout his career.

== Death ==
Abe died from Bromisoval overdose in 1978, causing an acute gastric perforation.
