= Grand Unification (Milford Graves album) =

Studio album by Milford Graves
- Released: 1998
- Recorded: October 11, 1997
- Studio: Avatar (New York, New York)
- Genre: jazz, percussion music
- Length: 1:04:04
- Label: Tzadik Records; TZ 7030
- Producer: Milford Graves

Milford Graves chronology
Meditation Among Us (1977)	Grand Unification (1998)	Stories (2000)

Grand Unification is an album by American percussionist Milford Graves, recorded in October 1997 and released in 1998 by Tzadik Records.

== Reception ==
Professional ratings
Review scores
Source	Rating
AllMusic	3/5 stars
The Penguin Guide to Jazz	3/4 stars

In a review for AllMusic, Stacia Proefrock wrote: "the record is a tight, technical masterpiece played with passion. Combining a variety of African, Asian, and Western drums with rhythmic chanting, Graves provides all of the instrumentation on the album and creates something rare: unaccompanied jazz percussion that shows variety and consistent energy throughout a nearly hour-long album."

The authors of The Penguin Guide to Jazz noted that, since being taken up by Tzadik Records, "for almost the first time in a long career, the drummer can be heard clearly and with definition."

Writing for the Chicago Reader, Peter Margasak called the album "a dense, enthralling work that demands repeated immersion," praised Graves's "mind-boggling multilinearity," and stated that "the barrage of grooves and ideas distracts a listener from the sheer mechanics of execution."

In an article for The Wire, Alan Licht commented that, while listening to "Intuitive Transformations," he noted "a certain correspondence between Graves's drumming and his conversational style. In the piece he establishes a rolling rhythm and then for the next 12 minutes constantly sets up instantaneous variations, fills and accents around it. During our interview, he makes many associative digressions, pulling examples from his various activities to illustrate a point he's trying to make, not rambling but letting his thoughts flow, never losing sight of the underlying question to be answered." Licht stated that Grand Unification finds Graves "in magisterial command, left to his own devices. Hearing him solo is like witnessing a shamanic ceremony, mysterious and packed with surprises yet totally coherent and rigorously crafted. Vocal incantation often accompanies the pulsating, swirling, scintillating flow as his limbs channel mature artistry, but also scientifically informed insights through the skin, wood and metal. Graves tunes in to the essential vibrations – within, between, beyond."

== Track listing ==
All compositions by Milford Graves.

1. "Grand Unification" - 5:12
2. "Transcriptions" - 5:21
3. "Gathering" - 10:29
4. "Decisive Moments" - 15:17
5. "Memory" - 5:24
6. "Know Your Place" - 5:25
7. "Intuitive Transformations" - 12:54
8. "Transcendence" - 3:48
- Recorded on October 11, 1997, at Avatar Studio, New York City.

== Personnel ==
- Milford Graves – drums, percussion, voice

== Production ==
- Milford Graves – producer
- John Zorn – executive producer
- Jim Anderson – engineer
