= Montego Joe =

American jazz percussionist and drummer

Roger "Montego Joe" Sanders (born 1929, New York City; d. June 28, 2010, Brooklyn, New York City) was an American jazz percussionist and drummer.

== Career ==
Sanders as a teenager played with a number of bands, led by top jazz musicians, including Babatunde Olatunji's (Drums of Passion, 1959) Art Blakey's Afro-Drum Ensemble (African Beat, Blue Note 1962), also with Ted Curson, Max Roach, Monty Alexander, Phil Upchurch, Dizzy Gillespie, Willis Jackson, Herbie Mann, Harold Vick, Teddy Edwards, George Benson, Jack McDuff, Rufus Harley (Kings/Queens) and Johnny Lytle. Under his own name he recorded the album Arriba! Con Montego Joe for Prestige Records prior to which he worked with Chick Corea with Eddie Gómez and Milford Graves, followed by the album Wild & Warm.

During the 1960s he worked with a group of Black youth in Harlem, known as HAR-YOU (Harlem Youth Unlimited), founded by sociologist Kenneth Clark. Montego Joe worked with the Harlem Youth Percussion Group for four years before taking them into the studio to record their debut album, HAR-YOU Percussion Group: Sounds of the Ghetto Youth for ESP-Disk in 1967. The reunion album was released in 1996 featuring many of the same personnel that were on the debut album. He subsequently worked with Cornell Dupree, Ralph MacDonald and Curtis Mayfield on the album Voices of East Harlem: Right On, Be Free, which was released by Elektra Records in 1970.

== Discography ==
=== As leader ===
- Arriba! Con Montego Joe (Prestige, 1964)
- Wild & Warm (Prestige, 1965)

=== As sideman ===
With George Benson

- The New Boss Guitar of George Benson (Prestige, 1964)
- George Benson/Jack McDuff (Prestige, 1977)

With Ted Curson

- Plays Fire Down Below (Prestige, 1963)
- I Heard Mingus (Trio, 1980)

With Willis Jackson

- Neapolitan Nights (Prestige, 1963)
- Shuckin' (Prestige, 1963)

With Illinois Jacquet

- The King! (Prestige, 1968)
- How High the Moon (Prestige, 1975)

With Roland Kirk

- Slightly Latin (Limelight, 1966)
- Kirk's Works (Mercury, 1977)

With Babatunde Olatunji

- Drums of Passion (Columbia, 1960)
- Afro Percussion (Columbia, 1961)
- Flaming Drums! (Columbia, 1962)
- High Life! (Columbia, 1963)

With Nina Simone

- At Carnegie Hall (Colpix, 1963)
- Folksy Nina (Colpix, 1965)

With others

- The 5th Dimension, Live!! (Bell, 1971)
- Ahmed Abdul-Malik, Sounds of Africa (New Jazz, 1962)
- Monty Alexander, Here Comes the Sun (MPS/BASF, 1972)
- Art Blakey, The African Beat (Blue Note, 1962)
- Ray Bryant, In the Cut (Cadet, 1974)
- Bo Diddley, Big Bad Bo (Chess, 1974)
- Teddy Edwards, Nothin' but the Truth! (Prestige, 1994)
- Rufus Harley, King/Queens (Atlantic, 1970)
- Richie Havens, Connections (Elektra, 1979)
- Solomon Ilori, African High Life (Blue Note, 1963)
- Johnny Lytle, New and Groovy (Tuba, 1967)
- Freddie McCoy, Listen Here (Prestige, 1968)
- Jack McDuff, Silk and Soul (Prestige, 1965)
- Buddy Montgomery, The Two-Sided Album (Milestone, 1968)
- Ted Nugent, Cat Scratch Fever (Epic, 1977)
- Harold Ousley, That's When We Thought of Love (J's Way, 1986)
- Johnny Pate, Outrageous (MGM, 1970)
- Jimmy Ponder, While My Guitar Gently Weeps (Cadet, 1974)
- Chuck Rainey, The Chuck Rainey Coalition (Skye, 1972)
- Sonny Stitt, Satan (Cadet, 1974)
- Grady Tate, Movin' Day (Janus, 1974)
- Sonny Truitt, Drummer Delights (Music Minus One, 1961)
- Phil Upchurch, Feeling Blue (Milestone, 1968)
- Harold Vick, The Caribbean Suite (RCA Victor, 1967)
- Charles Williams, Trees and Grass and Things (Mainstream, 1971)
