= Toshiyuki Tsuchitori =

Japanese musician

Tsuchitori Toshiyuki
- 土取 利行
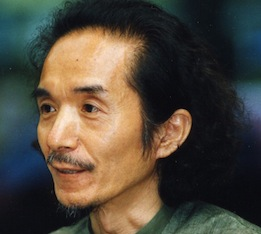
- Born: September 1, 1950 (age 76); Tadotsu, Kagawa Prefecture, Occupied Japan
- Occupation: Musician
- Notable work: Hōgaku Bangaichi (邦楽番外地)
- Website: wperc.d.dooo.jp

Toshiyuki Tsuchitori (土取 利行, Tsuchitori Toshiyuki; b. 1950) is a Japanese multi-instrumentalist, music historian, and ethnomusicologist. He is also sometimes known as Toshi Tsuchitori.

== Biography ==
Tsuchitori was born in 1950 in Tadotsu, Kagawa. He was introduced to music through percussion, and began playing festival taiko at a young age. As a teen, he played modern jazz in Osaka.

In the early 1970s, he started his career as an avant-garde jazz percussionist and came to collaborate with Kondō Toshinori, Takagi Mototeru, Oki Kano, and others. He has also performed with dancers such as Ōno Kazuo and musicians from outside the country including Derek Bailey and Milford Graves. Beginning in 1976, Tsuchitori composed theatrical scores for the works of Peter Brook.

In 1981, while studying native folk music from Asia and Africa, he met the shamisen player Momoyama Harue, the last disciple of Tomomichi Soeda. In 1987, he and Momoyama established the record label Ryūkō Gakusha (立光学舍) in Gujō-Hachiman, Gifu Prefecture as a base for their activities.

From 1988 to 1998, Tsuchitori produced and performed in the "Ryūkō Gakusha Festival" every summer, an event featuring performances based on local folk tales and legends of Mino Province. Musicians and dancers were invited from across the country.

Around this time, Tsuchitori was also involved in a series of projects aiming to recreate prehistoric Japanese music. In the early 2000s, he recorded reconstructed paleolithic music in the Cougnac Caves near Payrignac, France.

He is currently researching the songs left by musicians of the Meiji and Taishō eras, particularly Soeda Azenbō but also including Hisada Kiseki, Iboshi Hokuto, and Nagai Yoshi. Tsuchitori has done live performances of Azenbō's songs as well as uploaded numerous recordings of the songs to his YouTube page.

== See also ==
- Archaeoacoustics
