= Masayuki Takayanagi =

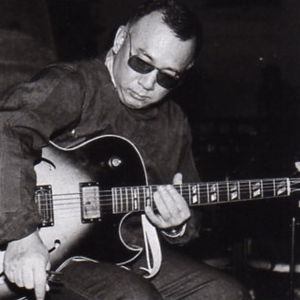

Background information
- Also known as: Jojo
- Born: December 22, 1932
- Origin: Tokyo, Japan
- Died: May 23, 1991 (aged 58)
- Genres: Jazz; Free improv Noise
- Occupation: Musician
- Instrument: Guitar
- Years active: 1951–91

Masayuki "Jojo" Takayanagi (高柳 昌行, Takayanagi Masayuki; December 22, 1932 – June 23, 1991) was a Japanese jazz / free improvisation / noise musician. He was active in the Japanese jazz scene from the late 1950s. In the 1960s he formed New Direction (later New Direction Unit), which recorded several albums throughout the 1970s. He also recorded several albums with saxophonist Kaoru Abe, including Kaitai Teki Kohkan, Gradually Projection and Mass Projection.

New Direction (a trio with Motoharu Yoshizawa and Yoshisaburo Toyozumi) started to perform in 1969. The absence of melody and rhythm in their playing, together with their volume, meant that their early performance opportunities were largely limited to the jazz coffee shop Nagisa in Tokyo. One attendee wrote: "The sound was so loud that the paint on the ceiling, shaken by the vibration, would flake off and fall like snow on the heads of the audience." Takayanagi sometimes dragged a metal chain over the guitar strings and hit them with a stick. His instructions to the rest of the trio were: "Play forte at all times. Don't repeat any phrases. Listening to what the others are playing and trying to play along is strictly forbidden."

For most of his career, Takayanagi played a 1963 Gibson ES-175.

== Discography ==
As leader/co-leader

- Ginparis Session (銀巴里セッション) (TBM, 1972) - live recorded 1963
- Flower Girl (Jinya Disc, 1968)
- Independence: Tread On Sure Ground (Tiliqua, 1970)
- A Jazzy Profile of Jojo (Victor, 1970)
- Kaitai Teki Kohkan (解体的交感) with Kaoru Abe (Sound Creators, 1970)
- Free Form Suite (TBM, 1972)
- Eclipse (Iskra, 1975)
- Axis: Another Revolvable Thing Part 1 (Offbeat, 1975)
- Axis: Another Revolvable Thing Part 2 (Offbeat, 1975)
- Cool Jojo (TBM, 1980)
- Live At Moers Festival (TBM, 1980)
- Lonely Woman (TBM, 1982)
- Lonely Woman Live (Jinya Disc, 1982)
- Mass Hysterism: In Another Situation (Jinya Disc, 1983)
- Dislocation (断層) (Jinya Disc, 1983)
- Action Direct: Live At Zojoji Hall (ALM, 1985)
- El Pulso (Jinya Disc, 1990)
- Reason For Being (Jinya Disc, 1990) with Nobuyoshi Ino
- Inanimate Nature: Action Direct/Live At Jean Jean (Jinya Disc, 1990)
- Three Improvised Variations On A Theme Of Qadhafi (Jinya Disc, 1990)
- April Is The Cruellest Month (Jinya Disc, 1991) - recorded 1975
- Call In Question (PSF, 1994) - recorded 1970
- Live Independence (PSF, 1970)
- Live at Jazz inn Lovely 1990 (NoBusiness, 2020) with Masabumi Kikuchi, Nobuyoshi Ino - live recorded in 1990
- Mass Projection with Kaoru Abe (DIW, 2001) - recorded 1970
- Gradually Projection with Kaoru Abe (DIW, 2001) - recorded 1970
- Complete "La Grima" (doubtmusic, 2007) – live recorded in 1971
