= Free jazz =

Music genre

- Other names: Free form jazz; free form
- Stylistic origins: Jazz; experimental; avant-garde; avant-garde jazz
- Cultural origins: Late 1950s, United States
- Derivative forms: Free improvisation; no wave; loft jazz; post-rock

Regional scenes
- Europe

Other topics
- Experimental rock; punk jazz

Free jazz (also known as free form jazz) is a style of avant-garde jazz or an experimental approach to jazz improvisation that developed in the late 1950s and early 1960s, when musicians attempted to change or break down jazz conventions, such as regular tempos, tones, and chord changes. Musicians during this period believed that the bebop and modal jazz that had been played before them was too limiting, and became preoccupied with creating something new. The term "free jazz" was drawn from Ornette Coleman's 1961 album Free Jazz: A Collective Improvisation. Europeans tend to favor the term "free improvisation", while others have used "modern jazz", "creative music", and "art music".

The ambiguity of free jazz presents problems of definition. Although it is usually played by small groups or individuals, free jazz big bands have existed. Although musicians and critics claim it is innovative and forward-looking, it draws on early styles of jazz and has been described as an attempt to return to primitive, often religious, roots. Although jazz is an American invention, free jazz musicians drew heavily from world music and ethnic music traditions from around the world. Sometimes they played African or Asian instruments, unusual instruments, or invented their own. They emphasized emotional intensity and sound for its own sake, exploring timbre.

== Characteristics ==
Free jazz was a reaction to the convolution of bebop. Conductor and jazz writer Loren Schoenberg wrote that free jazz "gave up on functional harmony altogether, relying instead on a far ranging, stream-of-consciousness approach to melodic variation". The style was largely inspired by the work of jazz saxophonist Ornette Coleman, whose 1961 album Free Jazz: A Collective Improvisation lent the genre its name. Jazz writer Don Heckman coined the term "action jazz" to describe free jazz.

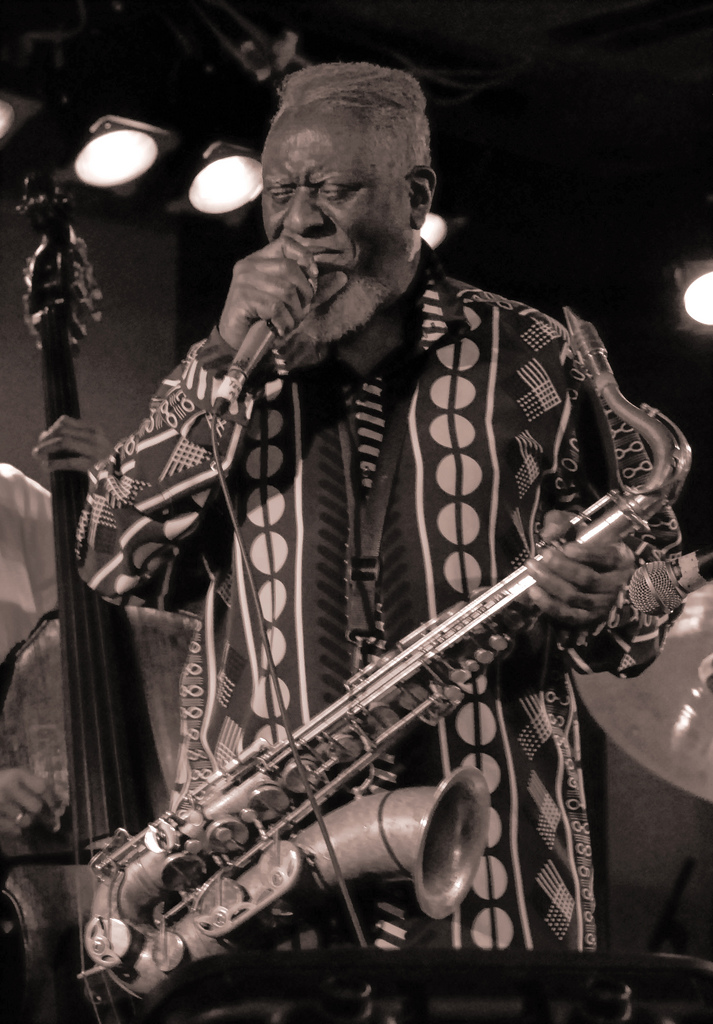
Pharoah Sanders in 2006

Some jazz musicians resist any attempt at classification. One difficulty is that most jazz has an element of improvisation. Many musicians draw on free jazz concepts and idioms, and free jazz was never entirely distinct from other genres, but free jazz does have some unique characteristics. Pharoah Sanders and John Coltrane used harsh overblowing or other extended techniques to elicit unconventional sounds from their instruments. Like other forms of jazz, it places an aesthetic premium on expressing the "voice" or "sound" of the musician, as opposed to the classical tradition in which the performer is seen more as expressing the thoughts of the composer.

Earlier jazz styles typically were built on a framework of song forms, such as twelve-bar blues or the 32-bar AABA popular song form with chord changes. In free jazz, however, the dependence on a fixed and pre-established form is often eliminated, and the role of improvisation is correspondingly increased.

Other forms of jazz use regular meters and pulsed rhythms, usually in 4/4 or (less often) 3/4. Free jazz retains pulsation and sometimes swings but without regular meter. Frequent accelerando and ritardando give an impression of rhythm that moves like a wave.

Previous jazz forms used harmonic structures, usually cycles of diatonic chords. When improvisation occurred, it was founded on the notes in the chords. Free jazz almost by definition is free of such structures, but also by definition, as it retains much of the language of earlier jazz playing. It is therefore very common to hear diatonic, altered dominant and blues phrases in this music.

Guitarist Marc Ribot commented that Ornette Coleman and Albert Ayler, "although they were freeing up certain strictures of bebop, were in fact each developing new structures of composition." Some forms use composed melodies as the basis for group performance and improvisation. Free jazz practitioners sometimes use such material. Other compositional structures are employed, some detailed and complex.

The breakdown of form and rhythmic structure has been seen by some critics to coincide with jazz musicians' exposure to and use of elements from non-Western music, especially African, Arabic, and Indian. The atonality of free jazz is often credited by historians and jazz performers to a return to non-tonal music of the 19th century, including field hollers, street cries, and jubilees (part of the "return to the roots" element of free jazz). This suggests that perhaps the movement away from tonality was not a conscious effort to devise a formal atonal system, but rather a reflection of the concepts surrounding free jazz. Jazz became "free" by removing dependence on chord progressions and instead using polytempic and polyrhythmic structures.

Rejection of the bop aesthetic was combined with a fascination with earlier styles of jazz, such as dixieland with its collective improvisation, as well as African music. Interest in ethnic music resulted in the use of instruments from around the world, such as Ed Blackwell's West African talking drum, and Leon Thomas's interpretation of pygmy yodeling. Ideas and inspiration were found in the music of John Cage, Musica Elettronica Viva, and the Fluxus movement.

Many critics, particularly at the music's inception, suspected that abandonment of familiar elements of jazz pointed to a lack of technique on the part of the musicians. By 1974, such views were more marginal, and the music had built a body of critical writing.

Many critics have drawn connections between the term "free jazz" and the American social setting during the late 1950s and 1960s, especially the emerging social tensions of racial integration and the civil rights movement. Many argue those recent phenomena such as the landmark Brown v. Board of Education decision in 1954, the emergence of the Freedom Riders in 1961, the 1963 Freedom Summer of activist-supported black voter registration, and the free alternative black Freedom Schools demonstrate the political implications of the word "free" in context of free jazz. Thus, many consider free jazz to be not only a rejection of certain musical credos and ideas, but a musical reaction to the oppression and experience of black Americans.

== History ==
Although free jazz is widely considered to begin in the late 1950s, there are compositions that precede this era that have notable connections to the free jazz aesthetic. Some of the works of Lennie Tristano in the late 1940s, particularly "Intuition", "Digression", and "Descent into the Maelstrom", exhibit the use of techniques associated with free jazz, such as atonal collective improvisation and lack of discrete chord changes. Other notable examples of proto-free jazz include City of Glass, written in 1948 by Bob Graettinger for the Stan Kenton band, and Jimmy Giuffre's 1953 "Fugue". It can be argued, however, that these works are more representative of third stream jazz with its references to contemporary classical music techniques such as serialism.

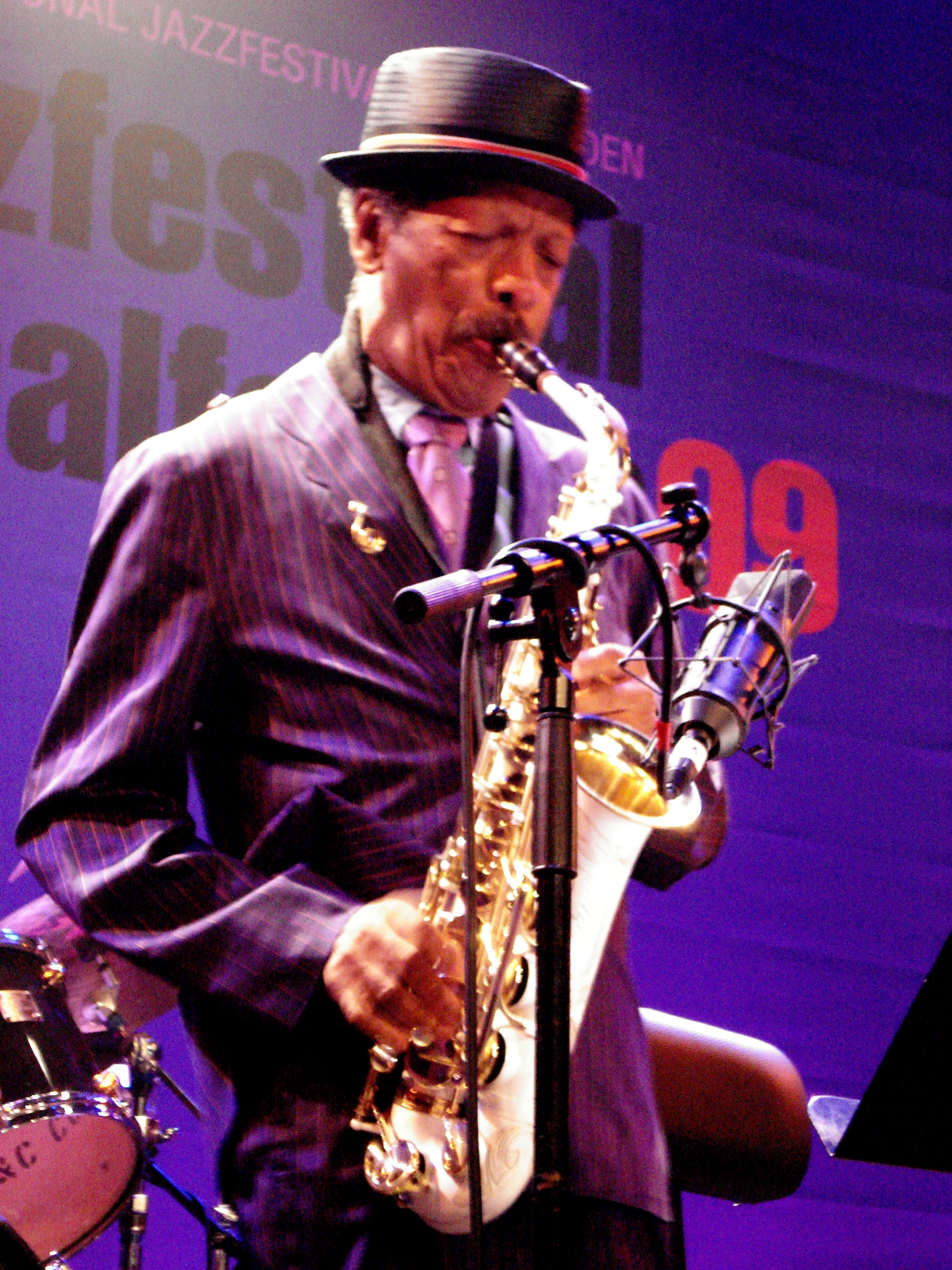
Coleman in 2009

Keith Johnson of AllMusic describes a "Modern Creative" genre in which "musicians may incorporate free playing into structured modes—or play just about anything". He includes John Zorn, Henry Kaiser, Eugene Chadbourne, Tim Berne, Bill Frisell, Steve Lacy, Cecil Taylor, Ornette Coleman, and Ray Anderson in this genre, which continues "the tradition of the '50s to '60s free-jazz mode".

Ornette Coleman rejected pre-written chord changes, believing that freely improvised melodic lines should serve as the basis for harmonic progression. His first notable recordings for Contemporary included Something Else!!!! (1958) and Tomorrow Is the Question! (1959), which do not follow typical 32-bar form and often employ abrupt changes in tempo and mood.

The free jazz movement received its biggest impetus when Coleman moved from the west coast to New York City and signed to Atlantic Records. Albums released during Coleman's tenure on the label, such as The Shape of Jazz to Come (1959) and Change of the Century (1960), marked a radical step beyond his more conventional early work. On these albums, he strayed from the tonal basis that formed the lines of his earlier albums and began truly examining the possibilities of atonal improvisation. The most important recording to the free jazz movement from Coleman during this era, however, came with 1961's Free Jazz: A Collective Improvisation, which marked an abrupt departure from the highly structured compositions of his past. Recorded with a double quartet separated into the left and right channels, Free Jazz brought a more aggressive, cacophonous texture to Coleman's work, and the record's title would provide the name for the nascent free jazz movement.

Pianist Cecil Taylor was also exploring the possibilities of avant-garde free jazz. A classically trained pianist, Taylor's main influences included Thelonious Monk and Horace Silver, who prove key to Taylor's later unconventional uses of the piano. Taylor's 1957 album Jazz Advance showed ties to traditional jazz, albeit with an expanded harmonic vocabulary. However, the harmonic freedom of these early releases would lead to his transition into free jazz during the early 1960s. Key to this transformation was the introduction of saxophonist Jimmy Lyons and drummer Sunny Murray in 1962, who encouraged more progressive musical language, such as tone clusters and abstracted rhythmic figures. Taylor marked his transition to free jazz on 1966's Unit Structures, as his compositions were composed almost without notated scores, devoid of conventional jazz meter, and harmonic progression. This direction was influenced by drummer Andrew Cyrille, who provided rhythmic dynamism outside the conventions of bebop and swing. Taylor also began exploring classical avant-garde, as in his use of prepared pianos developed by composer John Cage.

Albert Ayler was one of the essential composers and performers during the early period of free jazz. He began his career as a bebop tenor saxophonist in Scandinavia, and had already begun pushing the boundaries of tonal jazz and blues to their harmonic limits. He soon began collaborating with notable free jazz musicians, including Cecil Taylor, in 1962. He pushed the jazz idiom to its absolute limits, and many of his compositions bear little resemblance to jazz of the past. Ayler's musical language focused on the possibilities of microtonal improvisation and extended saxophone technique, creating squawks and honks with his instrument to achieve multiphonic effects. Yet amidst Ayler's progressive techniques, he showed an attachment for simple, rounded melodies reminiscent of folk music, which he explored via his more avant-garde style.

One of Ayler's key free jazz recordings is Spiritual Unity (1965), including his oft-recorded and most famous composition, "Ghosts", in which a simple, spiritual-like melody is gradually shifted and distorted through Ayler's unique improvisatory interpretation. Ultimately, Ayler served as an important example of many ways which free jazz could be interpreted, as he often strayed into more tonal areas and melodies while exploring the timbral and textural possibilities within his melodies. In this way, his free jazz is built upon both a progressive attitude towards melody and timbre as well as a desire to examine and recontextualize the music of the past.

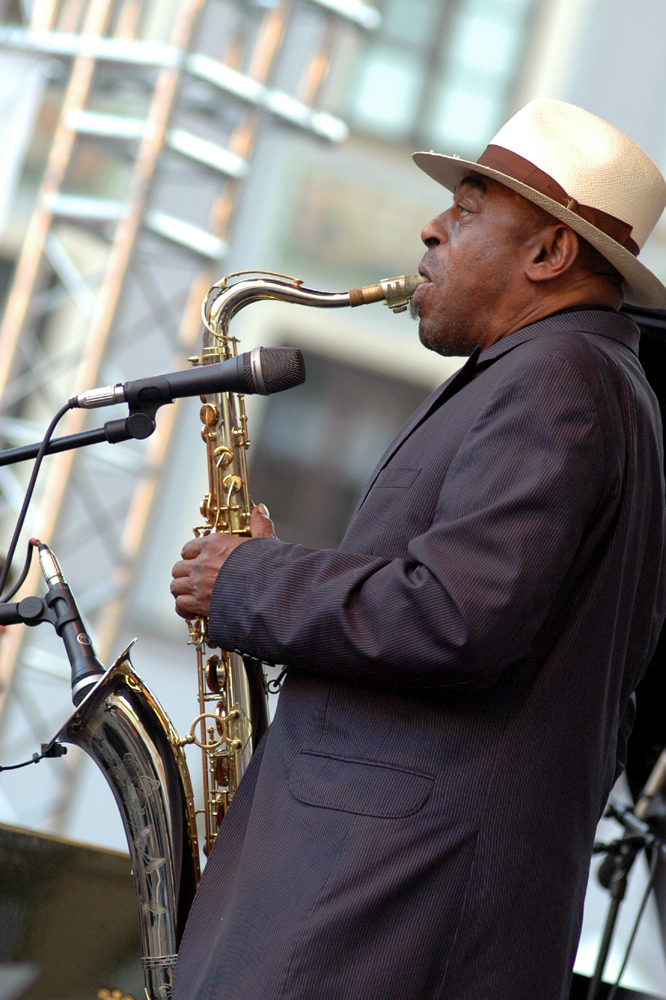
Archie Shepp in 2008

In a 1963 interview with Jazz magazine, Coltrane said he felt indebted to Coleman. While Coltrane's desire to explore the limits of solo improvisation and the possibilities of innovative form and structure was evident in records like A Love Supreme (1965), his work owed more to the tradition of modal jazz and post-bop. With 1966's Ascension, however, Coltrane demonstrated his appreciation for the new wave of free jazz innovators. On Ascension, Coltrane augmented his quartet with six horn players, including Archie Shepp and Pharoah Sanders. The composition includes free-form solo improvisation interspersed with sections of collective improvisation reminiscent of Coleman's Free Jazz. The piece sees Coltrane exploring the timbral possibilities of his instrument, using over-blowing to achieve multiphonic tones. Coltrane continued to explore the avant-garde in his following compositions, including such albums as Meditations (1966), Kulu Se Mama (1967), and Om (released posthumously in 1968), as well as collaborating with John Tchicai.

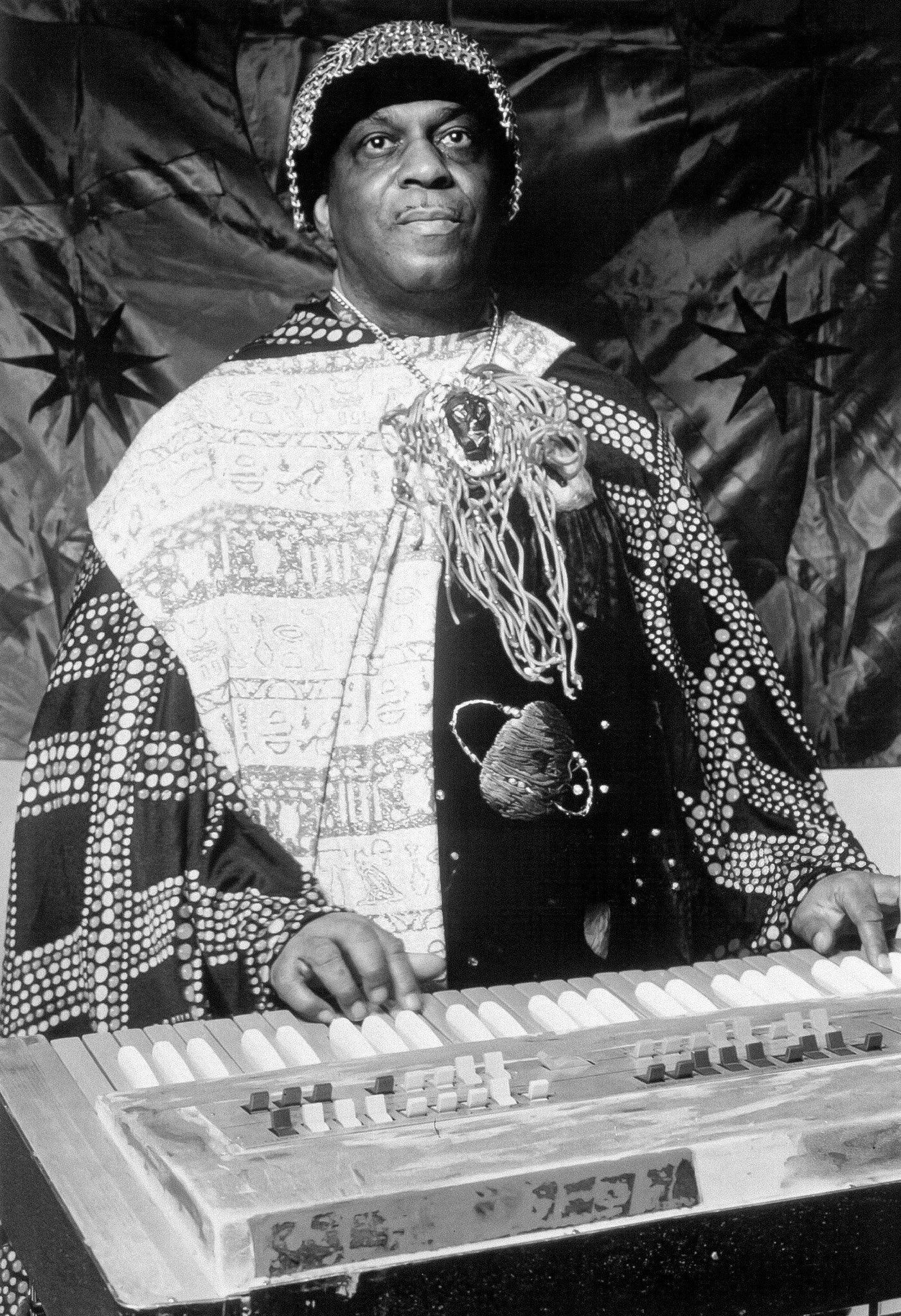
Sun Ra in 1973

Much of Sun Ra's music, especially his work from the 1960s, could be classified as free jazz, although Sun Ra said repeatedly that his music was written and boasted that what he wrote sounded more free than what "the freedom boys" played. The Heliocentric Worlds of Sun Ra, Volume One (1965) was steeped in what could be referred to as a new black mysticism. Sun Ra's penchant for nonconformity aside, he was, along with Coleman and Taylor, an integral voice to the formation of new jazz styles during the 1960s. As evidenced by his compositions on Sound of Joy (recorded in 1956 but not released until 1968), Sun Ra's early work employed a typical bop style. However, he soon foreshadowed the free jazz movements with compositions like "A Call for All Demons" (recorded in 1956 but not released until 1967 on the album Angels and Demons at Play), which combines atonal improvisation with Latin-inspired mambo percussion. Sun Ra's period of fully realized free jazz experimentation began with the releases of The Heliocentric Worlds of Sun Ra in 1965 and The Magic City in 1966. These records placed a musical emphasis on timbre and texture over meter and harmony, employing a wide variety of electronic instruments and innovative percussion instruments, including the electric celeste, Hammond B-3, bass marimba, harp, and timpani. As result, Sun Ra proved to be one of the first jazz musicians to explore electronic instrumentation, in addition to displaying an interest in timbral possibilities through his use of progressive, unconventional instrumentation in his compositions.

The title track of Charles Mingus's 1956 album Pithecanthropus Erectus contained one improvised section in a style unrelated to the piece's melody or chord structure. Mingus's contributions were primarily in his efforts to bring back collective improvisation in a music scene that had become dominated by solo improvisation as a result of big bands.

Outside of New York, a number of significant free jazz scenes appeared in the 1960s, and often gave birth to collectives. In Chicago, numerous artists were affiliated with the Association for the Advancement of Creative Musicians, founded in 1965. In St. Louis, the multidisciplinary Black Artists Group was active between 1968 and 1972. Pianist Horace Tapscott founded the Pan Afrikan Peoples Arkestra and Union of God's Musicians and Artists Ascension in Los Angeles. Although they did not organize as formally, a notable number of free jazz musicians were also active in Albert Ayler's hometown of Cleveland, including Charles Tyler, Norman Howard, and the Black Unity Trio.

By the 1970s, the setting for avant-garde jazz was shifting to New York City. Arrivals included Arthur Blythe, James Newton, and Mark Dresser, beginning the period of New York loft jazz. As the name may imply, musicians during this time would perform in private homes and other unconventional spaces. The status of free jazz became more complex, as many musicians sought to bring in different genres into their works. Free jazz no longer necessarily indicated the rejection of tonal melody, overarching harmonic structure, or metrical divide, as laid out by Coleman, Coltrane, and Taylor. Instead, the free jazz that developed in the 1960s became one of many influences, including pop music and world music.

Paul Tanner, Maurice Gerow, and David Megill have suggested,

the freer aspects of jazz, at least, have reduced the freedom acquired in the sixties. Most successful recording artists today construct their works in this way: beginning with a strain with which listeners can relate, following with an entirely free portion, and then returning to the recognizable strain. The pattern may occur several times in a long selection, giving listeners pivotal points to cling to. At this time, listeners accept this – they can recognize the selection while also appreciating the freedom of the player in other portions. Players, meanwhile, are tending toward retaining a key center for the seemingly free parts. It is as if the musician has learned that entire freedom is not an answer to expression, that the player needs boundaries, bases, from which to explore.

Tanner, Gerow, and Megill name Miles Davis, Cecil Taylor, John Klemmer, Keith Jarrett, Chick Corea, Pharoah Sanders, McCoy Tyner, Alice Coltrane, Wayne Shorter, Anthony Braxton, Don Cherry, and Sun Ra as musicians who have employed this approach.

== Other media ==
Canadian artist Stan Douglas uses free jazz as a direct response to complex attitudes towards African-American music. Exhibited at documenta 9 in 1992, his video installation Hors-champs (meaning "off-screen") addresses the political context of free jazz in the 1960s, as an extension of black consciousness and is one of his few works to directly address race. Four American musicians, George E. Lewis (trombone), Douglas Ewart (saxophone), Kent Carter (bass) and Oliver Johnson (drums) who lived in France during the free jazz period in the 1960s, improvise Albert Ayler's 1965 composition "Spirits Rejoice."

Canadian artist Michael Snow's 1964 film New York Eye and Ear Control features a soundtrack of group improvisations recorded by an augmented version of Albert Ayler's group and released as the album New York Eye and Ear Control. Critics have compared the album with the key free jazz recordings: Ornette Coleman's Free Jazz: A Collective Improvisation and John Coltrane's Ascension. John Litweiler regards it favorably in comparison because of its "free motion of tempo (often slow, usually fast); of ensemble density (players enter and depart at will); of linear movement." Ekkehard Jost places it in the same company and comments on "extraordinarily intensive give-and-take by the musicians" and "a breadth of variation and differentiation on all musical levels."

In the 1960s, French artist Jean-Max Albert, as trumpet player of Henri Texier's first quintet, participated in one of the first expressions of free jazz in France. As a painter, he then experimented plastic transpositions of Ornette Coleman's approach. Free jazz, painted in 1973, used architectural structures in correspondence to the classical chords of standard harmonies confronted with an unrestrained all over painted improvisation.

Jean-Max Albert still explores the free jazz lessons, collaborating with pianist François Tusques in experimental films Birth of Free Jazz and Don Cherry.

== In the world ==
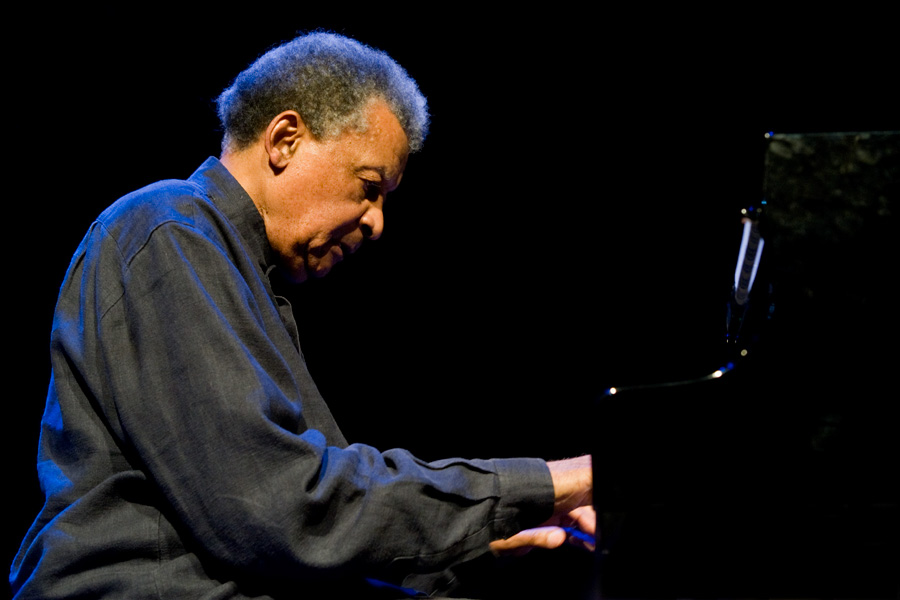
Dollar Brand in 2011

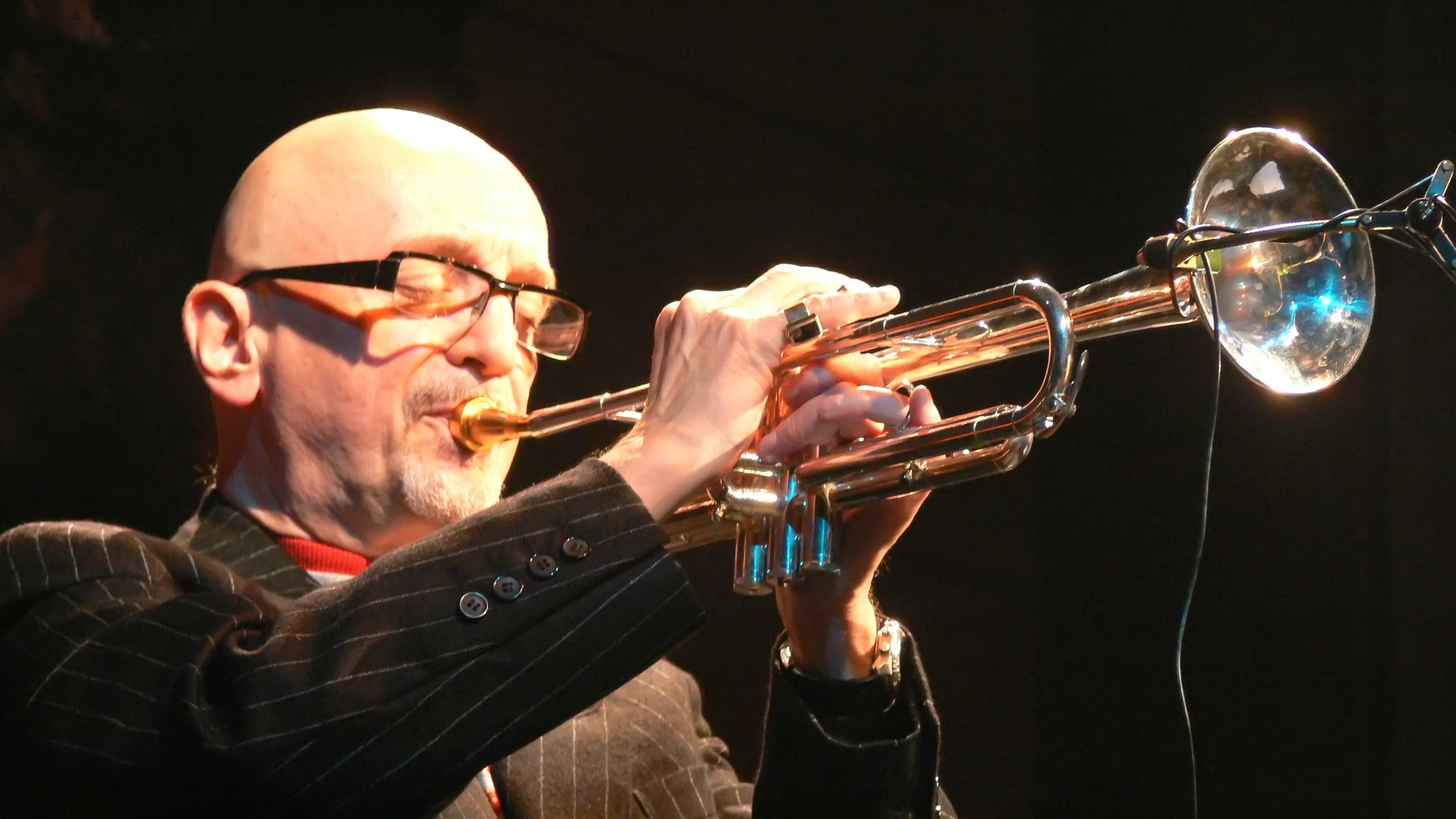
Tomasz Stańko in 2007

Founded in 1967, the Quatuor de Jazz Libre du Québec was Canada's most notable early free jazz outfit. Outside of North America, free jazz scenes have become established in Europe and Japan. Alongside the aforementioned Joe Harriott, saxophonists Peter Brötzmann, Evan Parker, trombonist Conny Bauer, guitarist Derek Bailey, pianists François Tusques, Fred Van Hove, Misha Mengelberg, drummer Han Bennink, saxophonist and bass clarinetist Willem Breuker were among the most well-known early European free jazz performers. European free jazz can generally be seen as approaching free improvisation, with an ever more distant relationship to jazz tradition. Specifically Brötzmann has had a significant impact on the free jazz players of the United States.

Japan's first free jazz musicians included drummer Masahiko Togashi, guitarist Masayuki Takayanagi, pianists Yosuke Yamashita and Masahiko Satoh, saxophonist Kaoru Abe, bassist Motoharu Yoshizawa, and trumpeter Itaru Oki. A relatively active free jazz scene behind the iron curtain produced musicians like Janusz Muniak, Tomasz Stańko, Zbigniew Seifert, Vyacheslav Ganelin and Vladimir Tarasov. Some international jazz musicians arrived in North America and became immersed in free jazz, most notably Ivo Perelman from Brazil and Gato Barbieri of Argentina (this influence is more evident in Barbieri's early work).

South African artists, including early Dollar Brand, Zim Ngqawana, Chris McGregor, Louis Moholo and Dudu Pukwana, experimented with a form of free jazz (and often big-band free jazz) that fused experimental improvisation with African rhythms and melodies. American musicians like Don Cherry, John Coltrane, Milford Graves, and Pharoah Sanders integrated elements of the music of Africa, India, and the Middle East for world-influenced free jazz.
