= Marc Edwards discography =

Marc Edwards (born July 23, 1949) is a free jazz drummer who has played and recorded with artists such as Cecil Taylor, Charles Gayle, and David S. Ware. His influences include Charlie Parker and Buddy Rich. He is currently playing with a project with Weasel Walter, and with his own group, Marc Edwards Slipstream Time Travel, an afrofuturistic free jazz ensemble. Many of his solo works have a science fiction theme. He also plays in the band Cellular Chaos, his first foray into rock drumming.

== As leader ==
=== 1991 – Marc Edwards Quartet – Black Queen ===
==== Tracks ====
1. Creation 10:52
2. Bumblebees and Marigold Flowers 12:29
3. Lite Free 10:30
4. Black Queen 06:08
5. Quadratic Equation 13:00
6. A New Day-A New Age 09:21

==== Credits ====
- Alto Saxophone [Alto Sax] – Rob Brown (4)
- Bass – Fred Hopkins
- Cover [Photo] – Marc Edwards
- Drums, Cymbal, Chimes, Gong, Timpani [Piccolo Tympani] – Marc Edwards
- Engineer – Nick Prout, Lawrence J. Peet
- Liner Notes – Marc Edwards
- Piano – Matthew Shipp
- Producer – Marc Edwards
- Voice Actor [Spoken Words] – Laverne Maxwell

=== Alpha Phonics presents Marc Edwards – Time and Space Vol 1 ===
==== Tracks ====
1. Pi R Squared 16:40
2. Science Fiction 15:01
3. Dark Space, In E Diminish, Op. 4, First Movement - Largo, From "The Crab Nebula Suite" 15:26
4. The Speed Of Light: E=Mc² 22:5

==== Credits ====
- Alto Saxophone [Alto Sax] – Cara Silvernail, Rob Brown
- Bass – Hilliard Green
- Drums, Gong, Cymbals, Timpani, Wind – Marc Edwards
- Edited By – Bill Titus, Fred Kevorkian, Walter Sear
- Engineer – David Voigt
- Engineer, Edited By – John Rosenberg
- Photography By – Mette Tronvoll, Marc Edwards
- Producer – Marc Edwards

=== 1997 – Marc Edwards Trio – Red Sprites and Blue Jets ===
==== Tracks ====
1. Positive Charge - Negative Release 11:30
2. Upper Atmosphere 13:57
3. African Rain Dance 12:06
4. Red Sprites & Blue Jets 15:07
5. Morning Dew 21:2

==== Credits ====
- Bass – Hilliard Greene
- Cover, Artwork – Kara D. Rusch
- Engineer – Marc D. Rusch
- Percussion, Composed By, Arranged By – Marc Edwards
- Producer – Robert D. Rusch
- Sleeve Notes – Robert D. Rusch, Marc Edwards
- Tenor Saxophone – Sabir Mateen
- Typography [Typesetting] – Hillary J. Ryan

=== 2007 – Marc Edwards and Slipstream Time Travel – Ode to a Dying Planet ===
==== Tracks ====
1. Ode to a Dying Planet 13:08
2. We’re Lost in Space, Aren’t We? 14:11
3. Cygnus Loop Detail 14:28

==== Credits ====
- Marc Edwards, drums
- Jeffrey Hayden Shurdut, piano
- Tor Snyder, guitar
- Ernest Anderson III, guitar
- (Ayler Records)

=== 2007 – Marc Edwards and Slipstream Time Travel – 12 Votes! ===
==== Credits ====
- Alto Saxophone – Blaise Siwula
- Bass – Francois Grillot
- Drums – Marc Edwards
- Electric Guitar – Ernest Anderson III, Tor Snyder*
- Piano – Jeffrey Hayden Shurdut*
- Trumpet – James Duncan

=== 2007 – Marc Edwards and Slipstream Time Travel – Ion Storm ===
==== Credits ====
- Tor Snyder - Electric Guitar
- Ras Moshe - Saxophone
- James Duncan - Trumpet
- Marc Edwards - Drums

=== 2013 – Planet X Just Blew Up! and Holographic Projection Holograms (double album) ===
==== Holographic Projection Holograms ====
===== Tracks =====
1. Birth Of The Universe
2. Floating In Space
3. Star Flakes!

===== Credits =====
- Marc Edwards - Drums
- Ernest Anderson III - guitar
- Takuma Kanaiwa - guitar
- Alex Lozupone - guitar/bass combo

==== Planet X Just Blew Up! ====
===== Tracks =====
1. Dark Space
2. Planet X Just Blew Up!
3. Suspended Animation

===== Credits =====
- Marc Edwards - Drums
- Ernest Anderson III - guitar
- Gene Janas - bass
- Tor Snyder - guitar
- Takuma Kanaiwa - guitar
- Lawry Zilmrah - bicycle wheel electronics

=== Others ===
- 2013 – Marc Edwards – Sakura Sakura (3 variations)
- 2015 – Mystic Mountain : Trouble in the Carina Nebula (Jazt Tapes CD-057)
- 2016 – There’s a Problem in the Keyhole Nebula (Jazt Tapes CD-062)

== As sideman ==
- 1976 – Cecil Taylor – Dark to Themselves
- 1993 – Charles Gayle – More Live at the Knitting Factory
- 2009 - Weasel Walter – Firestorm
- 2009 - Marc Edwards Weasel Walter Group - Mysteries Beneath the Planet
- 2010 - Marc Edwards Weasel Walter Group - Blood of the Earth
- 2011 - Cellular Chaos - Demo Live 5.12.11
- 2012 - Marc Edwards Weasel Walter Group - Solar Emissions
- 2019 - Colin Fisher - Living Midnight

with David S. Ware

- Birth of a Being (HatHut, 1979)
- Passage to Music (Silkheart, 1988)
- Great Bliss, Vol. 1 (Silkheart, 1991)
- Great Bliss, Vol. 2 (Silkheart, 1991)
- Flight of I (DIW/Columbia 1992)
- Birth of a Being [Expanded] (AUM Fidelity, 2015)

with Cellular Chaos

- 2011 - demo
- 2012 - Cellular Chaos EP
- 2013 - Cellular Chaos LP

== Other projects ==
- 2019 - Marc Edwards & Guillaume Gargaud - Black Hole Universe
