= Maya with Love =

Studio album by Harold Mabern
- Released: June 27, 2000
- Recorded: June 21, 1999
- Studios: Avatar (New York, New York)
- Genre: Jazz
- Length: 65:22
- Labels: DIW (DIW-622)
- Producers: James Williams, Kazunori Sugiyama

Harold Mabern chronology
Mabern's Grooveyard (1998)	Maya with Love (2000)	Kiss of Fire (2001)

Maya with Love is an album by pianist Harold Mabern which was released by DIW Records in 2000.

== Recording and music ==
The personnel are Harold Mabern (piano), Christian McBride (bass), and Tony Reedus (drums). This trio had recorded the album Mabern’s Grooveyard in 1996. "To Maya Glenne with Love" is for Mabern's granddaughter.

== Release and reception ==
Professional ratings
Review scores
Source	Rating
AllMusic	4/5 stars

Maya with Love was released by DIW Records in 2000. The AllMusic reviewer concluded that Mabern's album was "a supreme performance that is full of joy and makes this artist's relative obscurity seem criminal."

== Track listing ==
All compositions by Harold Mabern except where noted

1. "To Maya Glenne with Love" – 6:52
2. "You Are Too Beautiful" (Richard Rodgers, Lorenz Hart) – 9:03
3. "Hymn of the Orient" (Gigi Gryce) – 5:43
4. "A Song for Connie" – 5:04
5. "Lament" (J. J. Johnson) – 7:24
6. "Boogie for All McShann" – 2:57
7. "Speak Low" (Kurt Weill, Ogden Nash) – 5:15
8. "Little Girl Blue" (Rogers, Hart) – 5:25
9. "Blue Bossa" (Kenny Dorham) – 5:02
10. "Maybe September" (Jay Livingston, Ray Evans, Percy Faith) – 8:28
11. "Begin the Beguine" (Cole Porter) – 4:09

== Personnel ==
- Harold Mabern – piano
- Christian McBride – bass
- Tony Reedus – drums
