= Live at Yoshi's =

Live at Yoshi's may refer to:

- Live at Yoshi's (Dee Dee Bridgewater album), 1998
- Live at Yoshi's (Joe Pass album), 1992
- Live at Yoshi's (Pat Martino album), 2001
- At Yoshi's, George Coleman album, 1989
