= Moves in the Field =

Studio album by Kelly Moran
- Released: March 29, 2024
- Studio: Yamaha Artist Services (New York City)
- Genre: Experimental
- Length: 45:04
- Label: Warp

Kelly Moran chronology
Vesela (2023)	Moves in the Field (2024)	Don't Trust Mirrors (2025)

Moves in the Field is a solo studio album by American pianist and composer Kelly Moran. It was released on March 29, 2024, through Warp Records. It received universal acclaim from critics.

== Background ==
Kelly Moran is an American pianist and composer. Moves in the Field is her first solo studio album since Ultraviolet (2018). In 2020, Yamaha Corporation loaned her a Disklavier player piano. She then began writing a series of duets for herself and the Disklavier. In 2023, she released the Vesela EP, which was created using the Disklavier. She used the instrument again for Moves in the Field.

The album's track "Sodalis (II)" is a reimagined version of "Sodalis", which originally appeared on the Field Works compilation album Ultrasonic (2020). It is the first arrangement she made of her music for player piano.

The album was released on March 29, 2024, though Warp Records.

== Critical reception ==
Professional ratings
Aggregate scores
Source	Rating
Metacritic	84/100
Review scores
Source	Rating
AllMusic	4/5 stars
Clash	9/10
The Observer	4/5 stars
Pitchfork	7.8/10
PopMatters	8/10

According to the review aggregator Metacritic, Moves in the Field received "universal acclaim" based on a weighted average score of 84 out of 100 from 5 critic scores.

Vanessa Ague of Pitchfork stated, "Moran's music gradually unfolds over the course of looped melodies that feel both unhurried and like running up a hill, evoking the fast-paced twirls and grace of the ice skaters that inspire her." She added, "Though repetition and precision are at the core of her music, Moran focuses less on interlocking rhythmic patterns and more on forming sweeping melodies out of short phrases that evolve over time." Nick Roseblade of Clash described Moves in the Field as "a glorious album, filled with captivating melodies." He added, "The album is Kelly Moran's finest work to date and really shows why she is in a league of her own." Kitty Empire of The Observer commented that "everything here is possible-sounding, humanistic and full of emotion; only slightly uncanny."

Christopher R. Weingarten of Stereogum placed the album at number 2 on his list of "The 10 Best Experimental Albums of 2024".

The album won the Best Classical Record award at the 2025 Libera Awards.

== Track listing ==
All tracks are written by Kelly Moran.

Moves in the Field track listing
No.	Title	Length
1.	"Butterfly Phase"	2:50
2.	"Superhuman"	4:32
3.	"Don't Trust Mirrors"	6:29
4.	"Dancer Polynomials"	4:22
5.	"Sodalis (II)"	5:03
6.	"Leitmotif"	3:32
7.	"It's Okay to Disappear"	4:46
8.	"Hypno"	5:19
9.	"Moves in the Field"	4:46
10.	"Solar Flare"	3:27
Total length:		45:04

== Personnel ==
Credits adapted from liner notes.

- Kelly Moran – piano
- Shane Hoshino – piano tuning
- Aaron Davis Ross – audio engineering
- Dan Bora – mixing
- Joshua Eustis – mastering
- Beau Thomas – lacquer cut
- JSA – typography, design
- Katharine Hayden – layout
- Brandon Bowen – photography
- Liz Yoshiko Schmidt – figure skating model
