= Forbidden Blues =

Studio album by James Blood Ulmer
- Released: October 20, 1998
- Recorded: July 30, 31 & September 8, 1996
- Genre: Jazz
- Length: 51:34
- Label: DIW
- Producer: Kazunori Sugiyama & James Blood Ulmer

James Blood Ulmer chronology
Music Speaks Louder Than Words (1996)	Forbidden Blues (1998)	Cross Fire (1997)

Forbidden Blues is an album by American guitarist James Blood Ulmer recorded in 1996 and released on the Japanese DIW label in 1998.

== Reception ==
The Allmusic review by Thom Jurek awarded the album 4 stars and stated, "For those seeking to listen to the continuing development of James Ulmer as a musician, there are projects like this one, that pick up where his Odyssey recordings leave off, and where the Blues Preacher and Blues Allnight recordings, flawed as they are, tried to direct our attention. This is jazz that embraces the spectrum of black music and holds within it the possibility for magic at each and every turn".

Professional ratings
Review scores
Source	Rating
Allmusic	4/5 stars

== Track listing ==
All compositions by James Blood Ulmer

1. "What Is" – 4:40
2. "Forbidden Blues" – 5:56
3. "Eviction" – 6:36
4. "Do You Wanna" – 6:47
5. "Forget Not" – 5:33
6. "High Yellow" – 5:07
7. "Hymn" – 5:52
8. "We Got to Get Together" – 6:15
9. "Inspiration" – 4:49
- Recorded at Avatar Studios, NYC on July 30, 31 & September 8, 1996

== Personnel ==
- James Blood Ulmer – guitar, vocals, flute
- Charles Burnham – violin (tracks 5, 7 & 9)
- Michael Musutafa – keyboards (tracks 4, 6 & 8)
- Calvin X Jones – acoustic bass (tracks 1–3)
- Amin Ali – electric bass (tracks 4, 6 & 8)
- Calvin Weston – drums
- Dana Manno – vocals (track 2)
