= In the Name Of =

In the Name Of may refer to:

- In the Name Of (record label)
- In the Name Of (film), a 2013 Polish drama film
- In the Name of..., an album by James Blood Ulmer
- "In the Name Of", a song by Babymetal from the album Metal Galaxy

== See also ==
- "In the Name", a song by Gotthard from the album G.
