= Some Other Time =

Some Other Time may refer to:

- Some Other Time (album), a 1981 album by John Hicks
- "Some Other Time", a song written by Leonard Bernstein, Betty Comden, and Adolph Green, from the 1944 musical On the Town
- "Some Other Time", a song written by Jule Styne and Sammy Cahn, from the 1944 film Step Lively
- "Some Other Time" (Sisters), a 1993 television episode

== See also ==
- "In the Meantime/Some Other Time", a song by Badfinger from the 1974 album Wish You Were Here
