= Beeroth =

Beeroth may refer to:

- Beeroth (biblical city), a town near Jerusalem named in the Bible
- Be'eroth Bene-Jaakan, also known as Be'eroth, a site mentioned in the biblical story of the Exodus
- Beirut, capital of Lebanon
- "Beeroth", a track from the album Masada: Hei by Masada
