= DIW Records =

Japanese record label

- Parent company: Disk Union
- Genre: avant-garde jazz
- Country of origin: Japan
- Location: Tokyo

DIW Records is a Japanese record label specializing in avant-garde jazz. It is a subsidiary of Disk Union. Kazunori Sugiyama was an executive producer for the label before starting Tzadik Records with John Zorn.

DIW's name stands for "Discs in the World" and is from a music magazine sold at Disk Union stores that announced the latest releases from American and European labels. Wilber Morris recorded the first album for DIW in 1983 in New York City. The catalogue includes music by the Art Ensemble of Chicago, Lester Bowie, James Carter, Steve Grossman, Harold Mabern, David Murray, James Blood Ulmer, David S. Ware, Rodney Whitaker, and John Zorn.

== Discography ==
Catalog	Year	Artist	Title	Notes
DIW-303	1986	J. R. Monterose	Straight Ahead	reissue of 1976 album; originally released as The Message 1960
DIW-305	1986	Tommy Flanagan Trio	The Complete Overseas	expanded reissue of Overseas (Prestige, 1958)
DIW-306/DIW-307	1986-11-25	Miles Davis & John Coltrane	Live in Stockholm 1960	2xCD; live
DIW-311		Blossom Dearie	Blossom Dearie Sings Rootin' Songs	
DIW-312		Jaco Pastorius/Pat Metheny/Bruce Ditmas/Paul Bley	Jaco	
DIW-315/DIW-316	1987	Thelonious Monk	Live in Stockholm 1961	2xCD; live
DIW-317/DIW-318	1988	Stan Getz	Stockholm Sessions '58	2xCD
DIW-319		Paul Bley	Alone, Again	
DIW-320		Eric Dolphy	Last Recordings	
DIW-321		Francisco Mondragon Rio featuring Jaco Pastorius	Natural	
DIW-325		Monica Zetterlund	Spring Is Here	
DIW-326/DIW-327	1989	Charles Mingus	In Paris 1970	2xCD; live
DIW-329		Gil Evans Orchestra	Little Wing	
DIW-330		Albert Ayler Quartet	The Hilversum Session	
DIW-331		Al Haig	Today!	
DIW-335		Kaoru Abe	Last Date	
DIW-349		Albert Ayler	The First Recordings Vol. 2	
DIW-355		Sonny Murray	Sonny's Time Now	
DIW-356		Marion Brown	Live in Japan	live
DIW-357		Milford Graves	Meditation Among Us	
DIW-358		Derek Bailey	Duo & Trio Improvisation	
DIW-359		Doug Hammond	Spaces	
DIW-360	1992	Joni James	When I Fall in Love	reissue
DIW-361	1992	Joni James	In the Still of the Night	reissue
DIW-362	1992	Joni James	Little Girl Blue	reissue
DIW-363	1992	Joni James	Let There Be Love	reissue
DIW-364	1992	Joni James	Joni Sings Songs by Victor Young & Frank Loesser	reissue
DIW-365	1992	Joni James	Merry Christmas from Joni	reissue
DIW-366	1992	Joni James	Sings Songs by Jerome Kern and Songs by Harry Warren	reissue
DIW-367	1992	Joni James	Je t'aime....I Love You	reissue
DIW-368	1992	Joni James	I'm Your Girl	reissue
DIW-369	1992	Joni James	After Hours	reissue
DIW-370	1992	Joni James	Like Three O'Clock in the Morning	reissue
DIW-371	1990	Kaoru Abe	Solo Live at Gaya, Vol. 1	live
DIW-372	1990	Kaoru Abe	Solo Live at Gaya, Vol. 2	live
DIW-373	1990	Kaoru Abe	Solo Live at Gaya, Vol. 3	live
DIW-374	1990	Kaoru Abe	Solo Live at Gaya, Vol. 4	live
DIW-375	1990	Kaoru Abe	Solo Live at Gaya, Vol. 5	live
DIW-376	1990	Kaoru Abe	Solo Live at Gaya, Vol. 6	live
DIW-377	1991	Kaoru Abe	Solo Live at Gaya, Vol. 7	live
DIW-378	1991	Kaoru Abe	Solo Live at Gaya, Vol. 8	live
DIW-379	1991	Kaoru Abe	Solo Live at Gaya, Vol. 9	live
DIW-380	1991	Kaoru Abe	Solo Live at Gaya, Vol. 10	live
DIW-381–DIW-384	1993-01-25	Miles Davis with John Coltrane and Sonny Stitt	In Stockholm 1960 Complete	4xCD; live
DIW-388		Sun Ra Arkestra	Live from Soundscape	live
DIW-389		Material	Live from Soundscape	live
DIW-395– DIW-398		Muhal Richard Abrams etc.	Interpretations of Monk: Live from Soundscape Series	live; 4xCD
DIW-389		Frank Lowe Quintet	Live from Soundscape	live
DIW-390	1994	Joni James	Among My Souvenirs	reissue
DIW-391	1994	Joni James	The Mood Is Swinging	reissue
DIW-392	1994	Joni James	The Mood Is Romance	reissue
DIW-393	1994	Joni James	I Feel a Song Coming On	reissue
DIW-394	1994	Joni James	My Favorite Things	reissue
DIW-400		James Blood Ulmer	Are You Glad to Be in America?	
DIW-401		Arthur Rhames Trio	Live from Soundscape	live
DIW-403		James Blood Ulmer	Tales of Captain Black	
DIW-405		Various artists	Hells Kitchen: Live from Soundscape	live
DIW-406		Various artists	Back on 52nd Street	
DIW-415		Masayuki Takayanagi, Kaoru Abe	Kaitaitekikoukan	
DIW-416		Robert Musso	Innermideum	
DIW-420		Ground Zero	Plays Standards	
DIW-453		Toshinori Kondo	Nerve Tripper	
DIW-458		Kaoru Abe	The Last Recording	
DIW-462		Ayibobo	Stone Voudou	
DIW-466		Willie Oteri	Spiral Out	
DIW-486		Tommy Flanagan	Tommy Flanagan Plays the Music of Harold Arlen	
DIW-601	1990	James Williams, Richard Davis, Ronnie Burrage	I Remember Clifford	
DIW-602	1990	Michel Sardaby Trio	Night Blossom	
DIW-603	1990	Stanley Cowell Trio	Close to You Alone	
DIW-604	1991	Ronnie Mathews Trio	Dark Before the Dawn	
DIW-605	1991	Walter Bishop, Jr. Trio	What's New	
DIW-606	1991	George Cables Trio	Night and Day	
DIW-607	1991	Chris Anderson Trio	Blues One	
DIW-608	1991	Harold Mabern Trio	Straight Street	
DIW-609	1992	Geoff Keezer Trio	World Music	
DIW-610	1992	Rahn Burton Trio	The Poem	
DIW-611	1992	Richard Wyands Trio	The Arrival	
DIW-612	1993	Ronnie Mathews Trio	Lament for Love	
DIW-613	1993	Various artists	Memphis Piano Convention	
DIW-614	1993	Harold Mabern Trio	Lookin' on the Bright Side	
DIW-615	1993	Jack Wilson Trio	In New York	
DIW-616	1994	The Contemporary Piano Ensemble	The Key Players	
DIW-617	1994	Robert Hurst Featuring Kenny Kirkland & Elvin Jones	One for Namesake	
DIW-618	1994	Craig Taborn Trio	Craig Taborn Trio	
DIW-619	1997	Misha Mengelberg Trio	No Idea	
DIW-620	1997	David Hazeltine	The Classic Trio	
DIW-621	1997	Harold Mabern Trio	Mabern's Grooveyard	
DIW-622	2000	Harold Mabern Trio	Maya with Love	
DIW-623	2000	James Williams Magical Trio	Awesome	
DIW-624	2001	Taylor Eigsti Trio	Taylor's Dream	
DIW-625	2002	David Kikoski	Comfortable	
DIW-626	2002	Sean Wayland	Colossus of Rhodes	
DIW-627	2002	Helge Lien Trio	Spiral Circle	
DIW-628	2002	Mike Nock	Changing Seasons	
DIW-629	N/A	(UNISSUED)	(UNISSUED)	(UNISSUED)
DIW-630	2003	Helge Lien Trio	Asymmetrics	
DIW-631	2005	Hakuei Kim Trio	Open the Green Door	
DIW-632	2006	Helge Lien Trio	To the Little Radio	
DIW-633	2007	Hakuei Kim Trio	Home Beyond the Cloud	
DIW-634	2008-01-25	Hakuei Kim Trio	Shadow of Time	
DIW-801	1987	Phalanx	Original Phalanx	
DIW-802	1987	David Murray	Recording N.Y.C. 1986	
DIW-803	1987	Steve Grossman	Standards	
DIW-804	1987	Art Ensemble of Chicago	Ancient to the Future	
DIW-805	1987	Richard Davis, Roland Hanna and Frederick Waits	Persia My Dear	
DIW-806	1987	Dusko Goykovich	Celebration	
DIW-807	1987	Stanley Cowell, Frederick Waits and Buster Williams	We Three	
DIW-808	1988	Trio Transition	Trio Transition	Reggie Workman, Freddie Waits & Mulgrew Miller
DIW-809	1988	Wilber Morris, David Murray & Dennis Charles	Wilber Force	
DIW-810	N/A	(UNISSUED)	(UNISSUED)	(UNISSUED)
DIW-811	1989	Steve Grossman	Katonah	
DIW-812	1988	John Hicks with David Murray	Sketches of Tokyo	
DIW-813	1987	Nathan Davis	London by Night	
DIW-814	1988	David Murray	Lovers	
DIW-815/DIW 816	1988	Art Ensemble of Chicago	The Complete Live in Japan	2xCD; live
DIW-817	1988	John Hicks	Inc. 1	originally released 1985
DIW-818	1988	Art Ensemble of Chicago	Naked	originally released 1986
DIW-819	1988	David Murray & Jack DeJohnette	In Our Style	originally released 1986
DIW-820	1991	Takeo Moriyama	Live at Lovely	live
DIW-821	1991	Lester Bowie's New York Organ Ensemble	The Organizer	
DIW-822	N/A	(UNISSUED)	(UNISSUED)	(UNISSUED)
DIW-823	1988	John Hicks Quartet featuring Bobby Watson	Naima's Love Song	
DIW-824	1988	Sun Ra Arkestra	Live at Pit-Inn, Tokyo, Japan, 8, 8, 1988	live; AKA Cosmo Omnibus Imagiable Illusion
DIW-825	1988	Music Revelation Ensemble	Music Revelation Ensemble	
DIW-826	1988	Phalanx	In Touch	
DIW-827	1989	Jaco Pastorius, Kenwood Dennard, Hilam Bullock	PDB	
DIW-828	1989	John Hicks Trio	East Side Blues	
DIW-829	1989	Trio Transition	Trio Transition with Special Guest Oliver Lake	
DIW-830	1989	David Murray	Deep River	
DIW-831	1989	Essence Featuring Jaco Pastorius	Last Flight	
DIW-832	1989	Art Ensemble of Chicago	The Alternate Express	
DIW-833	1989	Geri Allen, Charlie Haden, Paul Motian	Segments	
DIW-834	1989	Lester Bowie's Brass Fantasy	Serious Fun	
DIW-835	1990	Lester Bowie's Brass Fantasy	My Way	
DIW-836	1990	Clifford Jordan	Four Play	
DIW-837	1990	Art Ensemble of Chicago with Amabutho	Art Ensemble of Soweto	
DIW-838	1990	Defunkt	Heroes	
DIW-839	1990	Music Revelation Ensemble	Elec. Jazz	
DIW-840	1990	David Murray	Ballads	
DIW-841	1990	David Murray	Spirituals	
DIW-842	1991	Art Ensemble of Chicago & Lester Bowie's Brass Fantasy	Live at the 6th Tokyo Music Joy	live
DIW-843	1991	David Murray	Special Quartet	
DIW-844	1991	Charlie Haden and the Liberation Music Orchestra	Dream Keeper	
DIW-845	1991	James Blood Ulmer	Black and Blues	
DIW-846	1991	Art Ensemble of Chicago with Cecil Taylor	Thelonious Sphere Monk: Dreaming of the Masters Series Vol. 2	
DIW-847	1991	Geri Allen, Charlie Haden & Paul Motian	Live at the Village Vanguard	live
DIW-848	1991	Art Ensemble of Soweto	America - South Africa	
DIW-849	1991	David Murray Quintet	Remembrances	
DIW-850	1991	David Murray Quartet	Shakill's Warrior	
DIW-851	1991	David Murray Big Band Conducted By Lawrence "Butch" Morris	David Murray Big Band	
DIW-852	1991	Pink Inc.	Pink Inc.	
DIW-853	1992	Lester Bowie's New York Organ Ensemble	Funky T. Cool T.	
DIW-854	1992	Art Ensemble of Chicago	Dreaming of the Masters Suite	
DIW-855	1992	Music Revelation Ensemble	After Dark	
DIW-856	1992	David S. Ware	Flight of I	
DIW-857	1992	Peter Brötzmann, Shoji Hano, Tetsu Yamauchi, Haruhiko Gotsu	Dare Devil	
DIW-858	1992	Andrew Cyrille Quintet	My Friend Louis	
DIW-859	1992	Rinde Eckert	Finding My Way Home	
DIW-860	1992	Strata Institute	Transmigration	
DIW-861	1992	David Murray Quartet + 1	Fast Life	
DIW-862	1992	Ronald Shannon Jackson & The Decoding Society	Raven Roc	
DIW-863	1992	Cassandra Wilson	Dance to the Drums Again	
DIW-864	1992	M-Base Collective	Anatomy of a Groove	
DIW-865	1992	Steve Coleman & Dave Holland	Phase Space	
DIW-866	1992	David Murray Quartet	Death of a Sideman	
DIW-867	1992	David Murray & Milford Graves	Real Deal	
DIW-868	1992	James Williams	James Williams Meets the Saxophone Masters	
DIW-869	1993	James Blood Ulmer	Blues Preacher	
DIW-870	1993	David S. Ware	Third Ear Recitation	
DIW-871	1993	Geoff Keezer	Other Spheres	
DIW-872	1993	Jean-Paul Bourelly & The Blue Wave Bandits	Saints & Sinners	
DIW-873	1993	Robert Hurst	Robert Hurst Presents: Robert Hurst	
DIW-874	1993	James Williamson, Calvin Newborn	Memphis Convention	
DIW-875	1993	James Carter Quartet	JC on the Set	
DIW-876	1993	Harold Mabern	The Leading Man	
DIW-877	1993	Ayibobo	Freestyle	
DIW-878	1993	James Blood Ulmer	Harmolodic Guitar with Strings	
DIW-879	1993	David Murray Octet	Picasso	
DIW-880	1993	David Murray Quartet	Ballads for Bass Clarinet	
DIW-881	1993	David Murray Quartet	Tenors	
DIW-882	1994	James Williams	Up to the Minute Blues	
DIW-883	1994	Jean-Paul Bourelly & The Bluwave Bandits	Blackadelic-Blu	
DIW-884	1994	David Murray Quartet	Shakill's II	
DIW-885	1994	Music Revelation Ensemble	In the Name of...	
DIW-886	1994	James Carter Quartet	Jurassic Classics	
DIW-887	1994	James Williams Sextet featuring Clark Terry	Talkin' Trash	
DIW-888	1994	John Zorn	Masada: Alef	
DIW-889	1994	John Zorn	Masada: Beit	
DIW-890	1994	John Zorn	Masada: Gimel	
DIW-891	1995	David Murray	The Tip	
DIW-892	1995	David S. Ware Quartet	Earthquation	
DIW-893	1995	Jean-Paul Bourelly	Tribute to Jimi	
DIW-894	1995	David Murray	Jug-A-Lug	
DIW-895	1995	Ronald Shannon Jackson	What Spirit Say	
DIW-896	1995	John Patton Quartet	Minor Swing	
DIW-897	1995	David Murray Big Band	South of the Border	
DIW-898	N/A	(UNISSUED)	(UNISSUED)	(UNISSUED)
DIW-899	1995	John Zorn	Masada: Hei	
DIW-900	1995	John Zorn	Masada: Vav	
DIW-901	1995	David Murray Quartet	For Aunt Louise	
DIW-902	1995	Marc Ribot	Don't Blame Me	
DIW-903	1996	Arcana	The Last Wave	
DIW-904	1996	Jamaaladeen Tacuma	Dreamscape	
DIW-905	1996	Music Revelation Ensemble	Knights of Power	
DIW-906	1996	David Murray	David Murray/James Newton Quintet	
DIW-907	1996	Rodney Whitaker	Children of the Light	
DIW-908	1996	David Murray	David Murray Quintet with Ray Anderson & Anthony Davis	
DIW-909	1996	Lisle Ellis, Lawrence Ochs, Donald Robinson	What We Live	
DIW-910	1996	James Blood Ulmer	Music Speaks Louder Than Words	
DIW-912	1996	Steve Grossman	Hold the Line	
DIW-913	1996	Ronald Shannon Jackson	Shannon's House	
DIW-914	1996	Vincent Chancey	Next Mode	
DIW-915	1996	John Zorn	Masada: Zayin	
DIW-916	1996	David S. Ware	Godspelized	
DIW-917	1996	Roberto Ottaviano & Mal Waldron	Black Spirits Are Here Again	
DIW-918	1996	Greg Cohen	Way Low	
DIW-919	1996	John Patton Quintet	This One's for Ja	
DIW-920	1996	Dougie Bowne	One Way Elevator	
DIW-921	1996	David Murray Quartet	Love and Sorrow	
DIW-922	1997	Berlin Contemporary Jazz Orchestra	Live in Japan '96	
DIW-923	1997	John Zorn	Masada: Dalet	
DIW-924	1997	Michael Weiss Quartet	Power Station	
DIW-925	1997	John Zorn	Masada: Het	
DIW-926	1997	Jef Lee Johnson	Communion	
DIW-927	1997	Music Revelation Ensemble	Cross Fire	
DIW-928	1998	Greg Cohen	Moment to Moment	
DIW-929	1998	Rodney Whitaker	Hidden Kingdom	
DIW-930	1998	David Murray Quartet	Long Goodbye: A Tribute to Don Pullen	
DIW-931	1998	Billy Harper	If Our Hearts Could Only See	
DIW-932	1998	James Blood Ulmer	Forbidden Blues	
DIW-933	1998	John Zorn	Masada: Tet	
DIW-934	1998	Dave Douglas	Moving Portrait	
DIW-935	1998	John Zorn	Masada: Yod	
DIW-936	2000	New York Art Quartet	35th Reunion	
DIW-937	2000	James Williams All-Stars	Classic Encounters!	
DIW-938	2000	Peter Brötzmann, Keiji Haino, Shoji Hano	Shadows	
DIW-939	2000	Lee Konitz	Some New Stuff	
DIW-940	2001	Ali/Belogenis/Morris	Live at Tonic	live
DIW-941	2001	David Kikoski Quintet	The 5	
DIW-942	2002	Otomo Yoshihide's New Jazz Quintet	Live	live
DIW-943	2002	Sumi Junko	Junko Sings Japanese Nursery Rhymes	
DIW-944	2003	Louie Belogenis	Twice Told Tales	
DIW-945	2003	George Robert & Kenny Barron	Peace	
DIW-946	2003	Otomo Yoshihide's New Jazz Quintet	Tails Out	
DIW-947	2005	George Robert	Soul Searching	live on December 6, 2003 at Chorus in Lausanne, Switzerland
DIW-J1001	2001-01-23	Masahiro Yoshida, Allen Farnham & Ray Drummond	Uno	
