= Third Ear Recitation =

Studio album by David S. Ware
- Released: 1993
- Recorded: October 14 & 15, 1992
- Studio: Sound On Sound, New York
- Genre: Jazz
- Length: 59:12
- Label: DIW
- Producer: Kazunori Sugiyama

David S. Ware chronology
Flight of I (1992)	Third Ear Recitation (1993)	Earthquation (1994)

Third Ear Recitation is an album by American jazz saxophonist David S. Ware recorded in 1992 and released on the Japanese DIW label. This is the first recording by the David S. Ware Quartet with Whit Dickey replacing former drummer Marc Edwards.

== Music ==
Ware, who learned circular breathing from Sonny Rollins at the age of sixteen, tackles the Rollins composition "East Broadway Run Down" at almost twice the tempo Rollins did on the album of the same name in 1966. Ware, a lifelong student of rhythm, dedicated "The Chase" to early associate drummer Beaver Harris, who died in December 1991. The quartet also plays two standards, Matt Dennis' "Angel Eyes", and two completely different takes of Joseph Kosma's "Autumn Leaves".

== Reception ==
Professional ratings
Review scores
Source	Rating
AllMusic	4.5/5 stars
The Penguin Guide to Jazz	3.5/4 stars

In his review for AllMusic, Thom Jurek states: "This is one of David S. Ware's most notorious, yet well-developed and executed recordings." The Penguin Guide to Jazz wrote that the album "was some sort of confirmation of Ware's growing interest in a more linear and at the same time harmonically refined approach to jazz."

== Track listing ==
All compositions by David S. Ware except as indicated

1. "Autumn Leaves" (Joseph Kosma) - 3:43
2. "East Broadway Run Down" (Sonny Rollins) - 9:40
3. "Mystic March" - 5:39
4. "Angel Eyes" (Matt Dennis) - 7:18
5. "Third Ear Recitation" - 4:42
6. "Free Flow Dialogue" - 3:17
7. "Sentient Compassion" - 6:46
8. "The Chase" - 9:11
9. "Autumn Leaves" (Joseph Kosma) - 8:56

== Personnel ==
- David S. Ware - tenor sax
- Matthew Shipp - piano
- William Parker - bass
- Whit Dickey - drums
