= Africa (Pharoah Sanders album) =

Studio album by Pharoah Sanders
- Released: 1987
- Recorded: March 11, 1987
- Studio: Studio 44, Monster, Netherlands
- Genre: Jazz
- Length: 56:59
- Label: Timeless SJP 253
- Producer: Wim Wigt

Pharoah Sanders chronology
Shukuru (1985)	Africa (1987)	Oh Lord, Let Me Do No Wrong (1987)

Africa is an album led by saxophonist Pharoah Sanders, recorded in 1987 and released on the Dutch Timeless label.

== Reception ==
Professional ratings
Review scores
Source	Rating
AllMusic	4/5 stars
The Penguin Guide to Jazz Recordings	3/4 stars

In his review for AllMusic, Steve Loewy commented: "Most will probably prefer the original Coltrane to Sanders' imitations, but Africa is nonetheless a joyous and worthy tribute to one of the giants of jazz. This album marked somewhat of a backtrack for the saxophonist, as he had frequently become identified with much more traditional playing".

The authors of The Penguin Guide to Jazz Recordings called the recording "Lovely, lovely stuff," and noted the "change of label and... deliciously stripped-down personnel." They stated that Lundy "fits in with Hicks like jigsaw pieces, a rich, contoured sound that prompts the wonder that Sanders ever wants to work in any other context."

Matt Fripp of Jazz Fuel included the album in his selection of "Ten Iconic Pharoah Sanders Albums," and wrote: "Sanders is able to tame the wilder musical excesses of his youth in favour of a simple, melodically inspired approach."

== Track listing ==
All compositions by Pharoah Sanders except as indicated

1. "You've Got to Have Freedom" – 10:01
2. "Naima" (John Coltrane) – 5:26
3. "Origin" – 6:50
4. "Speak Low" (Kurt Weill, Ogden Nash) – 8:04
5. "After the Morning" (John Hicks) – 6:29
6. "Africa" – 8:20
7. "Heart to Heart" – 7:17 Bonus track on CD & Music On Vinyl reissue
8. "Duo" – 4:32 Bonus track on CD & Music On Vinyl reissue

== Personnel ==
- Pharoah Sanders – tenor saxophone
- John Hicks – piano
- Curtis Lundy – bass
- Idris Muhammad – drums
