= Heart is a Melody =

Heart Is a Melody

Live album by Pharoah Sanders
- Released: 1983
- Recorded: January 23, 1982
- Venue: Keystone Korner, San Francisco, CA
- Genre: Post-bop, avant-garde jazz
- Length: 63:09
- Label: Theresa TR 118
- Producer: Pharoah Sanders

Pharoah Sanders chronology
Pharoah Sanders Live... (1982)	Heart Is a Melody (1983)	Shukuru (1985)

Heart Is a Melody is a live album led by saxophonist Pharoah Sanders, recorded in 1982 and released on the Theresa label.

== Reception ==
Professional ratings
Review scores
Source	Rating
AllMusic	3/5 stars
The Penguin Guide to Jazz Recordings	2.5/4 stars
The Rolling Stone Jazz & Blues Album Guide	3/5 stars
The Virgin Encyclopedia of Jazz	3/5 stars

In his review for AllMusic, Scott Yanow commented: "There are some fiery moments but few surprises on this date chiefly recommended to Sanders fans".

The authors of The Penguin Guide to Jazz Recordings stated that Sanders "appears to be rethinking his strategy... turning back to standards-playing for the first time in many years," but noted that "one can't help feeling that in these years Sanders marked time musically."

== Track listing ==
All compositions by Pharoah Sanders except as indicated

1. "Olé" (John Coltrane) – 22:13
2. "On a Misty Night" (Tadd Dameron) – 7:00
3. "Heart Is a Melody of Time (Hiroko's Song)" (William S. Fischer, Pharoah Sanders) – 7:32
4. "Goin' to Africa (Highlife)" – 3:49
5. "Naima" (Coltrane) – 7:28 Bonus track on CD reissue
6. "Rise 'n' Shine" (Stephen Ballantine, Buddy DeSylva, Vincent Youmans) – 15:07 Bonus track on CD reissue

== Personnel ==
- Pharoah Sanders – tenor saxophone, vocals
- William Henderson – piano
- John Heard – bass
- Idris Muhammad – drums
- Paul Arslanian – bells, whistle (track 4)
- Andy Bey, Flame Braithwaite, Cort Cheek, Janie Cook, Mira Hadar, Deborah McGriff, Jes Muir, Kris Wyn – vocals (track 3)
- William Fischer – vocal arranger and director (track 3)
