= Masada: Beit =

Studio album by John Zorn
- Released: 1995
- Recorded: February 20, 1994
- Genre: Jazz
- Length: 61:02
- Label: DIW; DIW 889
- Producer: John Zorn, Kazunori Sugiyama

Masada chronology
Masada: Alef (1994)	Masada: Beit (1995)	Masada: Gimel (1995)

John Zorn chronology
Masada: Alef (1994)	Masada: Beit (1995)	The Art of Memory (1995)

Masada: Beit, also known as ב or Masada 2, is a 1995 album by American jazz composer and saxophonist John Zorn. It is the second album of Masada recordings.

== Critical reception ==
The AllMusic review by Jim Smith awarded the album 4½ stars stating "John Zorn's absorption of klezmer motifs into avant-garde jazz is remarkable in itself, but even more extraordinary is Masada's utter command of the two genres' fiercely visceral energies... Simply stated, this is one of jazz's greatest groups".

Professional ratings
Review scores
Source	Rating
AllMusic	4.5/5 stars
The Penguin Guide to Jazz	3.5/4 stars

== Track listing ==
All tracks are written by John Zorn.

No.	Title	Length
1.	"Piram"	7:08
2.	"Hadasha"	10:05
3.	"Lachish"	2:25
4.	"Rachab"	4:47
5.	"Peliyot"	4:32
6.	"Achshaph"	2:44
7.	"Sansanah"	7:09
8.	"Ravayah"	3:19
9.	"Sahar"	6:12
10.	"Tirzah"	8:47
11.	"Shilhim"	2:18

- Recorded at RPM, New York City on February 20, 1994

== Personnel ==
=== Masada ===
- John Zorn — alto saxophone
- Dave Douglas — trumpet
- Greg Cohen — bass
- Joey Baron — drums

=== Technical personnel ===
- John Zorn, Kazunori Sugiyama – producer
- Jim Anderson – recording engineer, mixing engineer
- Allan Tucker – mastering engineer
- Arai Yasunori – cover design
- Gershom Scholem – liner notes
