= Beyond a Dream (Pharoah Sanders and Norman Connors album) =

Live album by Pharoah Sanders and Norman Connors
- Released: 1981
- Recorded: July 22, 1978
- Venue: Montreux Jazz Festival, Montreux, Switzerland
- Genre: Jazz
- Length: 44:27
- Label: Arista Novus; AN 3021
- Producer: Michael Cuscuna, Norman Connors

Pharoah Sanders chronology
Journey to the One (1980)	Beyond a Dream (1981)	Rejoice (1981)

Professional ratings
Review scores
Source	Rating
AllMusic	2.5/5 stars
The Rolling Stone Album Guide	3.5/5 stars
The Virgin Encyclopedia of Jazz	3/5 stars

Beyond a Dream is a live album by saxophonist Pharoah Sanders and drummer Norman Connors. It was recorded on July 22, 1978, at the Montreux Jazz Festival in Montreux, Switzerland, and was released in 1981 by Arista Novus. On the album, Sanders and Connors are joined by saxophonist and flutist Buzzy Jones, trumpeter Duke Jones, keyboardists Bobby Lyle and Billy McCoy, guitarist Greg Hill, bassist Alex Blake, conga player Lawrence Killian, and percussionist Petro Bass.

== Track listing ==
1. "Babylon" (Billy McCoy) – 8:40
2. "Beyond a Dream" (Kenny Cox) – 10:23
3. "Montreux Overture" (Pharoah Sanders) – 4:35
4. "The End of the Beginning" (Bobby Lyle) – 4:55
5. "Casino Latino" (Pharoah Sanders) – 15:25

== Personnel ==
- Pharoah Sanders – tenor saxophone
- Norman Connors – drums, percussion
- Buzzy Jones – saxophone, flute
- Duke Jones – trumpet
- Bobby Lyle – piano
- Billy McCoy – piano, keyboards
- Greg Hill – guitar
- Alex Blake – electric bass
- Lawrence Killian – congas
- Petro Bass – percussion
