= Masada: Dalet =

Studio album by John Zorn
- Released: 1995
- Recorded: February 20, 1994, RPM, NYC
- Genre: Jazz
- Length: 18:46
- Label: DIW DIW 923
- Producer: John Zorn, Kazunori Sugiyama

Masada chronology
Masada: Gimel (1994)	Masada: Dalet (1995)	Masada: Hei (1995)

John Zorn chronology
Masada: Gimel (1994)	Masada: Dalet (1995)	John Zorn's Cobra: Live at the Knitting Factory (1995)

Masada: Dalet, also known as ד or Masada 4, is a 1995 EP by American composer and saxophonist John Zorn. It is the fourth album of Masada recordings. The original pressing of this album was never available for retail sale as it was given away by DIW in exchange of the proof of buying the first three Masada albums up to June 1995. It was reissued in 1997 as a regular release.

== Reception ==
The Allmusic review by Don Snowden awarded the album 3 stars stating "There's nothing to fault with the performances, and obviously Zorn wanted the music released, but really, what's the point? Is anyone seriously into Zorn and/or Masada going to knowingly choose an 18-minute disc with so many full-length volumes out there?.. Dalet isn't bad, just pointless except for total completists or timid souls who want to gingerly dip their toes in these swirling whirlpool waters".

Professional ratings
Review scores
Source	Rating
Allmusic	3/5 stars
The Penguin Guide to Jazz	3/4 stars

== Track listing ==
1. "Midbar" - 6:20
2. "Mahlah" - 8:19
3. "Zenan" - 3:57

All compositions by John Zorn.
- Recorded at RPM, New York City on February 20, 1994

== Personnel ==
Masada

- John Zorn — alto saxophone
- Dave Douglas — trumpet
- Greg Cohen — bass
- Joey Baron — drums
