= Two of a Kind (Ray Drummond and John Hicks album) =

Studio album by John Hicks and Ray Drummond
- Released: 1989
- Recorded: June 14, 1986 & August 4, 1987 at Bear West Studios, San Francisco, CA
- Genre: Jazz
- Length: 60:25 CD reissue with bonus tracks
- Label: Theresa TR 128
- Producer: Al Pittman

John Hicks chronology
Sketches of Tokyo (1985)	Two of a Kind (1989)	I'll Give You Something to Remember Me By (1987)

Two of a Kind is an album by American jazz pianist John Hicks and bassist Ray Drummond recorded in 1986 and 1987 and released on the Theresa label. The 1992 Evidence CD reissue added three bonus tracks.

== Reception ==
Allmusic awarded the album 3 stars stating "They were a true duo, each player conscious of the other but able to make his own way".

Professional ratings
Review scores
Source	Rating
Allmusic	3/5 stars
The Penguin Guide to Jazz Recordings	3/4 stars

== Track listing ==
1. "I'll Be Around" (Alec Wilder) - 4:41
2. "Take the Coltrane" (Duke Ellington) - 4:42
3. "Very Early" (Bill Evans) - 7:31
4. "I'm Getting Sentimental Over You" (Ned Washington, George Bassman) - 7:03
5. "For Heaven's Sake" (Elise Bretton, Sherman Edwards, Donald Meyer) - 6:07
6. "Come Rain or Come Shine" (Harold Arlen, Johnny Mercer) - 5:14
7. "A Rose Without a Thorn" (Abdul Salim) - 7:33
8. "Without a Song" (Edward Eliscu, Billy Rose, Vincent Youmans) - 6:08
9. "A Nightingale Sang in Berkeley Square" (Eric Maschwitz, Manning Sherwin) - 4:29
10. "Parisian Thoroughfare" (Bud Powell) - 3:00
11. "Springtime Fantasy" (John Hicks) - 3:57

== Personnel ==
- John Hicks - piano
- Ray Drummond - bass
