= Knights of Power =

Studio album by Music Revelation Ensemble
- Released: 1996
- Recorded: April 15 & 16, 1995
- Studio: East Side Sound, New York City
- Genre: Jazz
- Length: 54:24
- Label: DIW; DIW 905
- Producer: James Blood Ulmer & Kazunori Sugiyama

Music Revelation Ensemble chronology
In the Name of... (1994)	Knights of Power (1996)	Cross Fire (1997)

James Blood Ulmer chronology
South Delta Space Age (1995)	Knights of Power (1996)	Music Speaks Louder Than Words (1996)

Knights of Power is an album by James Blood Ulmer's Music Revelation Ensemble, with guest saxophonists Arthur Blythe and Hamiet Bluiett, recorded in 1995 and released on the Japanese DIW label.

== Reception ==
The AllMusic review by Thom Jurek stated: "Along with No Wave, this is the best of the Music Revelation Ensemble's recordings; it kicks ass". Jazz Review's Lee Prosser awarded the album 4 stars, enthusing: "This CD mixes funk, fusion and straight jazz idioms into a blend that is fresh and high energy. Question! Is some new jazz starting to meld together? THIS WILL WAKE YOU UP . Find this gem ....... and you will understand why it is called KNIGHTS OF POWER .

Professional ratings
Review scores
Source	Rating
AllMusic	4/5 stars
Jazz Review	4/5 stars

== Track listing ==
All compositions by James Blood Ulmer

1. "The Scandal Monger" – 5:33
2. "The Day Of" – 7:55
3. "Convulsion" – 7:48
4. "Noise and Clamor" – 6:44
5. "The Elephant" – 9:46
6. "Father of Flame" – 4:12
7. "Quarish" – 5:09
8. "Back Biter" – 7:17

== Personnel ==
- James Blood Ulmer – guitar
- Amin Ali – electric bass
- Cornell Rochester – drums
- Arthur Blythe – alto saxophone (tracks 1, 2, 5 & 7)
- Hamiet Bluiett – baritone saxophone (tracks 3, 4, 6 & 8)
