= Live at the Bayerischer Hof =

Live album by The James Blood Ulmer Blues Experience
- Released: 1994
- Recorded: April 25, 1994
- Venues: Bayerischer Hof, Munich, Germany
- Genre: Jazz
- Length: 59:18
- Labels: In + Out; IOR 77018-1
- Producers: Frank Kleinschmidt, James Blood Ulmer

James Blood Ulmer chronology
In the Name of... (1994)	Live at the Bayerischer Hof (1994)	South Delta Space Age (1995)

Live at the Bayerischer Hof is a live album by guitarist James Blood Ulmer which was recorded at the Bayerischer Hof in Munich in 1994 and released on the In + Out label.

== Reception ==
Professional ratings
Review scores
Source	Rating
Allmusic	2.5/5 stars

The Allmusic review by Steven McDonald stated, "the performances are very fine indeed. Ulmer's vocal style is engagingly rough and heartfelt, pure blues all the way; this provides an effective contrast to his convoluted guitar work (and the band's support). Ulmer's guitar work is outstanding, transcending the blues label and heading for the outer territories of jazz at quite a rate of knots".

== Track listing ==
All compositions by James Blood Ulmer

1. "Burning Up" – 7:06
2. "Church" – 9:00
3. "Crying" – 7:05
4. "Let Me Take You Home" – 4:52
5. "Boss Lady" – 8:06
6. "Street Bride" – 5:54
7. "Blues Allnight" – 8:56 Additional track on vinyl double LP release
8. "Timeless" – 5:41
9. "Make It Right" – 11:10

== Personnel ==
- James Blood Ulmer – guitar, vocals
- Amin Ali – electric bass
- Aubrey Dayle – drums
