= Cross Fire (Music Revelation Ensemble album) =

Studio album by Music Revelation Ensemble
- Released: 1997
- Recorded: December 17 & 18, 1996
- Studios: Avatar (New York, New York)
- Genre: Jazz
- Length: 53:03
- Labels: DIW; DIW 927
- Producers: James Blood Ulmer & Kazunori Sugiyama

Music Revelation Ensemble chronology
Knights of Power (1996)	Cross Fire (1997)

James Blood Ulmer chronology
Forbidden Blues (1996)	Cross Fire (1997)	Reunion (1998)

Cross Fire is an album by James Blood Ulmer's Music Revelation Ensemble, with guest saxophonists Pharoah Sanders and John Zorn, recorded in 1996 and released on the Japanese DIW label.

== Reception ==
The Allmusic review by Don Snowden awarded the album 4 stars, stating, "Music Revelation Ensemble seems to be the context that Blood Ulmer reserves his strongest melodies for, and he plays with the kind of fire and invention that made him a major figure. Cross Fire probably isn't the best place to plunge in and explore the music, but it's a very worthy addition to the catalog".

Professional ratings
Review scores
Source	Rating
Allmusic	4/5 stars

== Track listing ==
All compositions by James Blood Ulmer

1. "Law" – 5:36
2. "Suspect" – 7:10
3. "Devotion" – 4:30
4. "Sweet" – 5:18
5. "Proof" – 6:36
6. "My Prayer" – 9:14
7. "Evidence" – 7:59
8. "Backbeat" – 6:40

== Personnel ==
- James Blood Ulmer – guitar
- Calvin "Hassen Truth" Jones – acoustic bass
- Cornell Rochester – drums
- John Zorn – alto saxophone (tracks 1, 3, 5 & 8)
- Pharoah Sanders – tenor saxophone (tracks 2, 4, 6 & 7)
