= Central Park West (composition) =

Composition by John Coltrane

from the album Coltrane's Sound
- Released: June 1964
- Studio: Atlantic
- Genre: Jazz, ballad
- Length: 4:16
- Label: Atlantic
- Composer: John Coltrane
- Producer: Nesuhi Ertegün

Central Park West is a jazz standard by American saxophonist John Coltrane. It first appeared on his 1964 studio album Coltrane's Sound.

== Background ==
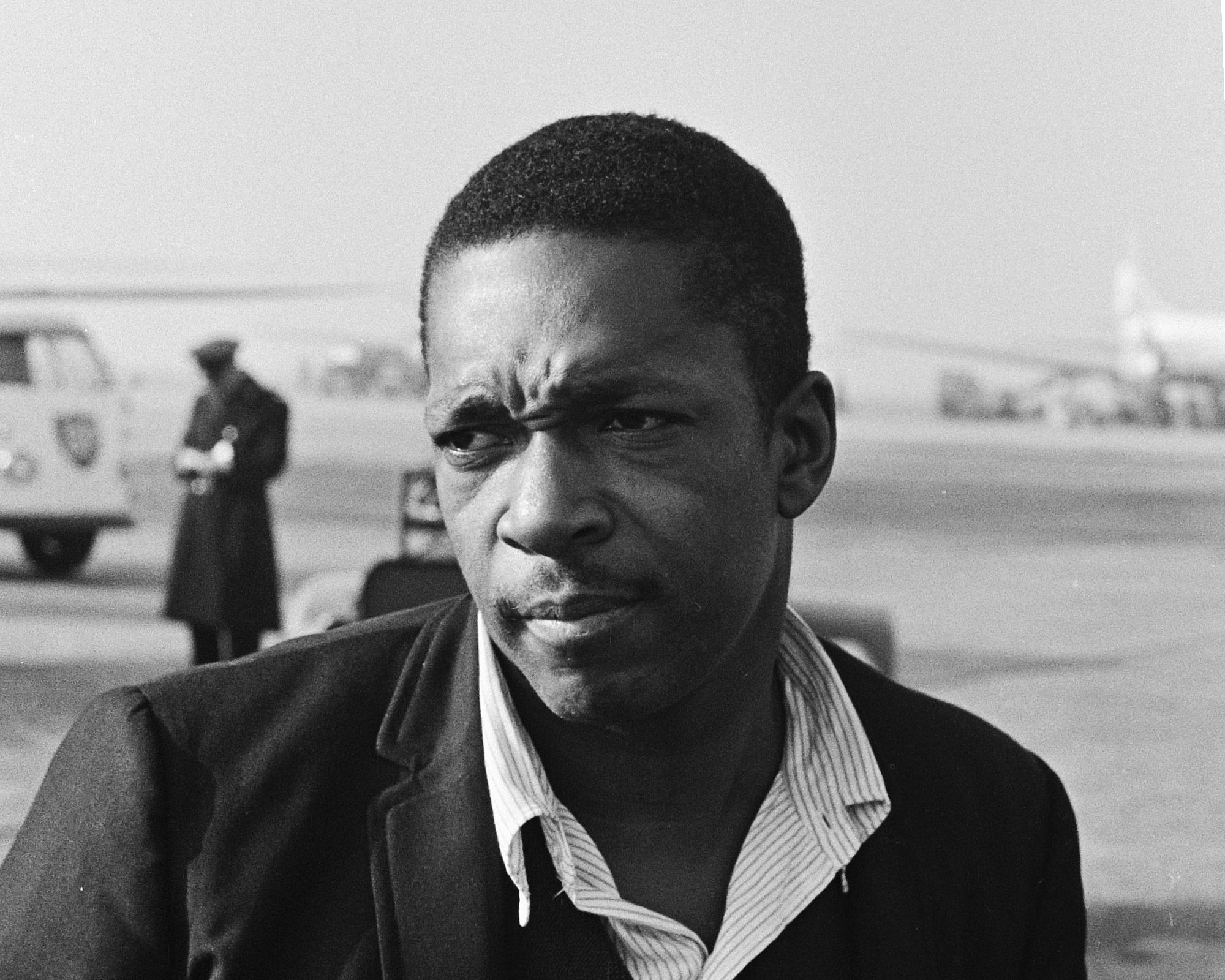
John Coltrane in 1963

Central Park West was included in Coltrane's Sound, a studio album recorded at Atlantic Studios during the sessions for My Favorite Things. The album was assembled after Coltrane had stopped recording for the label and was under contract to Impulse! Records. Like Prestige and Blue Note Records before them, as Coltrane's fame grew during the 1960s, Atlantic used unissued recordings and released them without either Coltrane's input or approval.

== Composition ==
The song is a 10-bar form in B major that is played like a ballad.

Form of Central Park West
BΔ7 / E-7 A7	DΔ7 / B♭-7 E♭7
A♭Δ7 / G-7 C7	FΔ7 / C♯-7 F♯7
BΔ7 / E-7 A7	DΔ7 / C♯-7 F♯7
BΔ7	C♯-7/B (Note: This is to say the C sharp minor 7 chord is being played over a B on the bass.)
BΔ7	C♯-7/B / C♯-7 F♯7
The forward slash denotes slash notation.

Central Park West employs Coltrane changes. In the song, Coltrane divides the octave into four, producing an ascending cycle of minor thirds: B – D – F – Ab – B. He slightly alters the cycle’s order, so that it becomes B – D – Ab – F – B, which alternates the modulation between minor thirds and tritones.

== Notable recordings ==
- Pharoah Sanders in "Rejoice (1981)"
- David Becker Tribune "Siberian Express"(1988)
- Tommy Flanagan and J.R. Monterose in "...And a Little Pleasure (1989)"
- Joe Lovano in "From The Soul (1992)"
- Jimmy Bruno in "Burnin' (1994)'"
- Everette Harp in "First Love (2009)"
- Avishai Cohen in "Duende (2013)"
- Glenn Zaleski in "Fellowship (2017)"
- José James in "The Dreamer (10th Anniversary Edition) (2018)"
- Tommy Flanagan in "Giant Steps (2018)" (Note: Not to be confused with John Coltrane's landmark jazz album, Giant Steps, released in 1960.)
- Lakecia Benjamin and Jazzmeia Horn in "Pursuance : The Coltranes (2020)" (Note: Sic est.)
- Jack DeJohnette in "Special Edition" on ECM Records (1980)

== See also ==
- Coltrane changes
