= Kelly Moran (musician) =

American musician

- Born: 17 February 1988 (age 38); Port Washington, New York, U.S.
- Origin: New York City, U.S.
- Genres: Classical; electronic; jazz; dream pop; black metal
- Occupations: Musician; composer
- Label: Warp
- Website: kellymoran.co

Kelly Moran (born February 17, 1988) is an American composer, producer, and multi-instrumentalist based in Brooklyn. Her music spans classical, electronic, minimalist, jazz, impressionist, and metal genres. In many of her compositions, Moran utilizes electronic musical techniques in combination with the John Cage-pioneered technique of the prepared piano. Moran signed with Warp Records in September 2018.

== Early life and education ==
Moran grew up in Port Washington, New York and started taking piano lessons when she was six years old. She also learned how to play string and electric bass, clarinet, oboe, and guitar. At age fifteen, she began experimenting with electronic music software.

Moran later earned her degree in Performing Arts Technology from the University of Michigan-Ann Arbor, where she studied piano performance, sound engineering, and composition. Moran pursued her MFA at the University of California, Irvine, where she explored the genres of minimalism and post-minimalism. While there, she composed experimental piano pieces primarily to accompany dance performances.

== Career ==
When Moran returned to New York after her graduate program, she played bass guitar for no-wave punk band Cellular Chaos. She also played keyboard and synth in experimental rock ensemble Voice Coils along with Mitski.

Moran self-released her first album, Optimist, in 2016 and re-released on vinyl and CD on Primal Architecture Records and Obsolete Units respectively.

Moran released her next album, Bloodroot, on Telegraph Harp in 2017. In it, she combines her classical piano training with her electronic production techniques and her passion for John Cage-style prepared piano. The album has been described as a melding of "electroacoustic deconstruction and classical, harmonious minimalism". Bloodroot was mastered by Colin Marston of metal bands Krallice and Gorguts. The New York Times named Bloodroot on its list of "The 25 Best Classical Music Recordings of 2017". Rolling Stone named it one of its 20 best avant albums of 2017. Bandcamp named it among its top 100 albums of 2017. Uproxx included it on its list of the best electronic and experimental records of 2017.

Moran signed with Warp Records in September 2018 to release her album Ultraviolet, which has been recognized by the New York Times, Rolling Stone, and Vice, among others. Ultraviolet is more rooted in improvisation than Moran's other meticulously-composed works. Until Ultraviolet, which was released in November 2018, Moran had been the sole engineer and producer of her records. In an interview, Moran noted that because the production world is male-dominated, she preferred establishing herself as an independent artist before bringing others in who may get credit for her work. Moran has referred to herself as "a very outspoken feminist" and believes "the act of a woman making music is a kind of political act in itself since we live in a world where women are expected to be quiet and are often silenced for speaking out." She believes performance and composition are ways for women to reclaim space and assert their existence.

In addition to her solo work, Moran has composed for Margaret Leng Tan, a classical music artist known for her work as a professional toy pianist and a John Cage collaborator. Moran is also a keyboardist in Oneohtrix Point Never's touring ensemble for his 2018 album Age Of.

She also released Moves in the Field (2024) and Don't Trust Mirrors (2025).

== Style ==
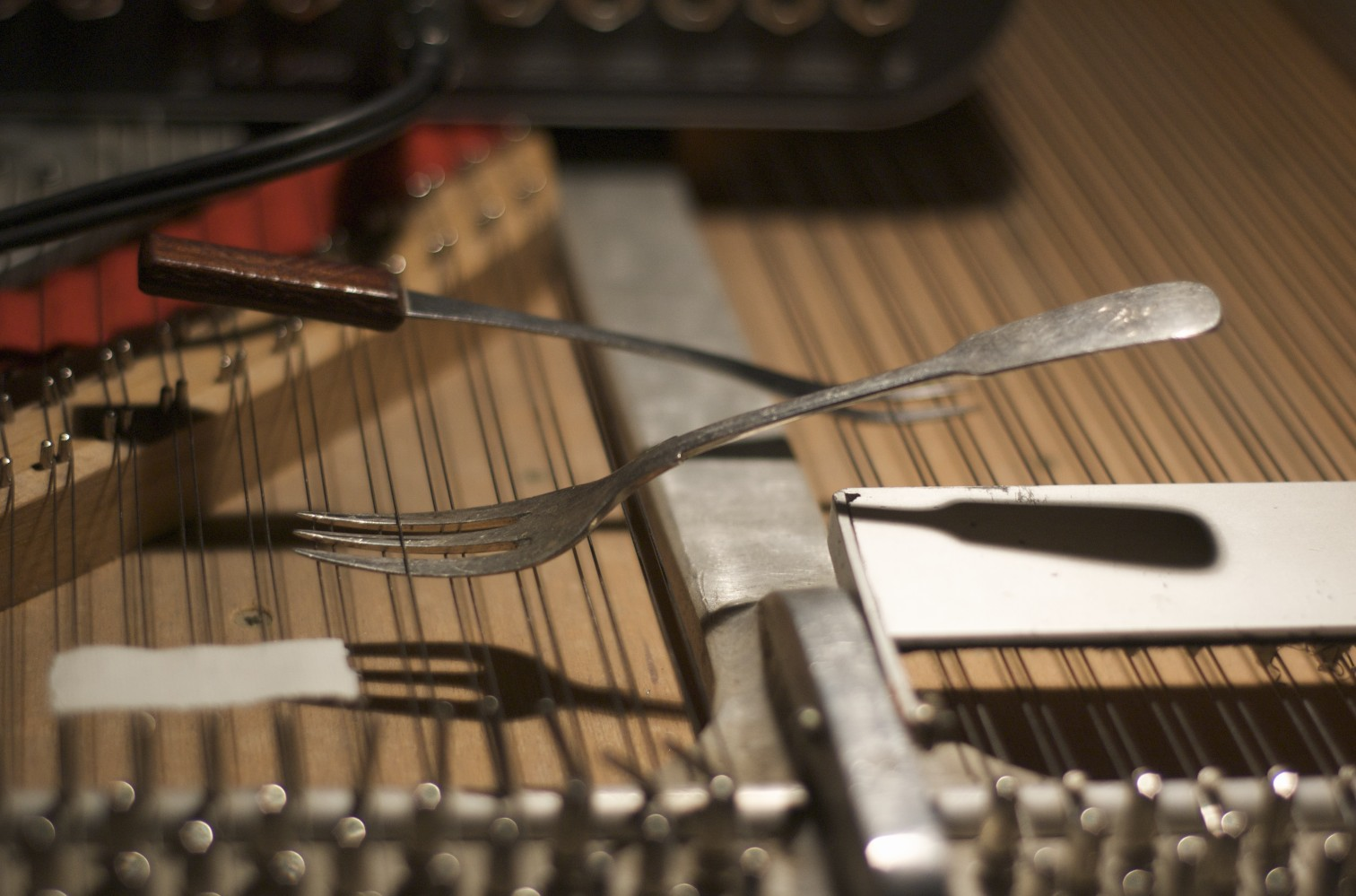
Example of a prepared piano.

Moran utilizes the prepared-piano format in her compositions, which involves altering a piano by placing objects on or between its strings. The style was pioneered by musicians John Cage and Henry Cowell. Moran's style is also compared to Erik Satie. Moran creates unique timbres through this method, often placing items like screws within the piano and playing the strings with her fingers or an EBow. Moran then records each sound she produces through these methods and feeds them into MIDI software and a sampling keyboard, thus allowing her to electronically manipulate the recordings and play them back as complex, new sounds. This technique creates "an electro-acoustic hybrid instrument" uniquely her own.

In addition to Cage, Moran cites Tori Amos and Kayo Dot as artistic influences.

== Discography ==
=== Albums ===
- Microcosms (2010)
- Movement (2011)
- One on One (2012)
- Optimist (2016)
- Bloodroot (2017)
- Ultraviolet (2018)
- Moves in the Field (2024)
- Don't Trust Mirrors (2025)

=== EPs ===
- Origin EP (2019)
- WXAXRXP Session (2019)
- Chain Reaction at Dusk (2020, with Prurient)

=== Singles ===
- "Love Birds, Night Birds, Devil-Birds" (2019)
