= Passage to Music =

Studio album by David S. Ware
- Released: 1989
- Recorded: April 4 & 5, 1988
- Studio: A&R Recording, New York
- Genre: Jazz
- Length: 48:23 (LP); 69:06 (CD)
- Label: Silkheart
- Producer: David S. Ware

David S. Ware chronology
Birth of a Being (1979)	Passage to Music (1989)	Great Bliss, Vol. 1 (1991)

Passage to Music is an album by American jazz saxophonist David S. Ware, recorded in 1988 and released on the Swedish Silkheart label. Besides the tenor sax, Ware plays the saxello, a variant of the soprano sax played by English jazz musician Elton Dean, and the stritch, a straight alto sax associated with multi-instrumentalist Rahsaan Roland Kirk. The CD edition includes two bonus tracks.

== Reception ==
Professional ratings
Review scores
Source	Rating
AllMusic	4/5 stars
The Penguin Guide to Jazz	3.5/4 stars

In his review for AllMusic, Scott Yanow states "David Ware's searching improvisations reward repeated listenings by open-eared listeners." The Penguin Guide to Jazz states "Passage To Music has something of Ayler's and Sander's Afro-mysticism and constitutes something of a personal initiation".

== Track listing ==
All compositions by David S. Ware

1. "An Ancient Formula" - 6:00
2. "Ancient Visitors" - 7:30
3. "Passage To Music"- 10:46
4. "African Secrets" - 10:47
5. "The Elders Path" - 13:20
6. "Phonetic Hymn" - 9:00
7. "Mystery" - 11:43

6 & 7 does not appear on original LP

== Personnel ==
- David S. Ware - tenor sax, saxello, stritch
- William Parker - bass
- Marc Edwards - drums
