= South Delta Space Age =

Studio album by Third Rail
- Released: 1995
- Recorded: 1995
- Studio: Greenpoint Studios, Brooklyn, NY
- Genre: Jazz
- Length: 51:34
- Label: Antilles; 533 965
- Producer: Bill Laswell, James Blood Ulmer

James Blood Ulmer chronology
Live at the Bayerischer Hof (1994)	South Delta Space Age (1995)	Knights of Power (1996)

South Delta Space Age is an album by the band Third Rail, featuring guitarist James Blood Ulmer, bassist Bill Laswell, drummer Joseph "Zigaboo" Modeliste, and organists Amina Claudine Myers and Bernie Worrell. It was recorded in 1995 and released on the Antilles label.

== Reception ==
Professional ratings
Review scores
Source	Rating
Allmusic	4.5/5 stars

Allmusic gave the album 4 1/2 stars, and the review by Stewart Mason stated, "The first album by the James Blood Ulmer and Bill Laswell collaboration Third Rail is a sometimes confusing mishmash of styles; however, given the title, it appears that the juxtaposition of dirty blues-based grooves and spacey psychedelic jazz-funk is entirely intentional. Whether or not the combination is entirely satisfying is up to the listener, but while the album occasionally seems to have more ideas than it knows what to do with, most of them do work".

== Track listing ==
All compositions by James Blood Ulmer except where noted

1. "Dusted" (James Blood Ulmer, Jesse Bonds Weaver, Jr., Bill Laswell) – 7:07
2. "Grounded" (Ulmer, Joseph Modeliste, Laswell) – 4:26
3. "Funk All Night" – 4:51
4. "In The Name Of" – 5:17
5. "Please Tell Her" – 3:55
6. "Itchin'" – 4:48
7. "Blues March" (Ulmer, Modeliste) – 7:45
8. "First Blood" – 5:22
9. "Lord Thank You" – 8:03

== Personnel ==
- James "Blood" Ulmer – guitar, vocals
- Bill Laswell − bass
- Joseph "Zigaboo" Modeliste – drums, percussion
- Bernie Worrell − Hammond B-3 organ, clavinet
- Amina Claudine Myers − Hammond B-3 organ, electric piano, voice
