= Inc. 1 =

Studio album by John Hicks Trio
- Released: 1985
- Recorded: April 4, 1985; Avaco Studio, Tokyo, Japan
- Genre: Jazz
- Length: 45:35
- Label: DIW; DIW 8004
- Producer: John Hicks

John Hicks chronology
In Concert (1984)	Inc. 1 (1985)	Sketches of Tokyo (1985)

Inc. 1 is an album by pianist John Hicks's Trio recorded in Japan in 1985 and released on the Japanese DIW label.

== Reception ==
The Allmusic review stated "This is an enjoyable date worth picking up".

Professional ratings
Review scores
Source	Rating
Allmusic	4/5 stars

== Track listing ==
All compositions by John Hicks except as indicated

1. "Ruby, My Dear" (Thelonious Monk) - 6:42 (bonus track on CD reissue)
2. "Bookie Please" - 6:30
3. "For Heaven's Sake" (Elise Bretton, Sherman Edwards, Donald Meyer) - 4:14
4. "Book Bossa" - 7:15
5. "Inc. 1" - 6:13
6. "Avojca" - 6:27
7. "'Round Midnight" (Thelonious Monk) - 8:14

== Personnel ==
- John Hicks - piano
- Walter Booker - bass
- Idris Muhammad - drums
