= Birth of a Being =

Studio album by David S. Ware
- Released: 1979
- Recorded: April 14 & 15, 1977
- Studio: C.I. Recording, New York City
- Genre: Jazz
- Length: 53:16 (LP); 105:00 (CD)
- Label: Hat Hut
- Producer: David S. Ware & Cooper-Moore

David S. Ware chronology
From Silence to Music (1978)	Birth of a Being (1979)	Passage to Music (1989)

reissue cover

Birth of a Being is the first recording as a leader by American jazz saxophonist David S. Ware, recorded in 1977 and originally released on the Swiss Hat Hut label. The record presents a collective trio called Apogee with pianist Cooper-Moore, then known as Gene Ashton, and drummer Marc Edwards. It was reissued on CD by AUM Fidelity in 2015 with a bonus disc including five unreleased tracks from the same sessions.

== Background ==
Cooper-Moore first met Ware at Berklee College of Music in Boston in 1967. By Cooper-Moore's suggestion, they start Apogee with drummer Marc Edwards in 1970. Sonny Rollins invited the band to open for him at the Village Vanguard in 1973. This event accelerated their move to New York. Within a year of arrival, Ware began performing extensively with Andrew Cyrille’s group Maono, and, together with Marc Edwards, joined the Cecil Taylor Unit. Numerous tours of the U.S. and Europe with these groups followed, during which time Ware developed the resolute desire to record his own music. In 1977, at Ware’s request, Apogee reconvened for one last time in order to document their work together in a studio setting.

== Reception ==
In his review for JazzTimes Steve Greenlee states "This is pulse-quickening music that never lets up. Ware picks up where John Coltrane left off, employing his spiritual approach and taking his force majeure to the next level."

The Point of Departure review by Jason Bivins says about the reissue "This is intense music for sure, not exactly the Big Bang but still nourished by original energies. Packaged gorgeously, too; it’s an essential release."

== Track listing ==
All compositions by David S. Ware except as indicated

1. "Prayer" - 10:54
2. "Thematic Womb" - 16:34
3. "A Primary Piece #1" - 13:48
4. "A Primary Piece #2" - 12:00

AUM Fidelity reissue CD 2

1. "Prayer (alt. take)" - 12:07
2. "Cry" - 14:06
3. "Stop Time" - 17:05
4. "Ashimba" (Cooper-Moore) - 2:30
5. "Solo" - 6:56

== Personnel ==
- David S. Ware – tenor saxophone
- Cooper-Moore – piano, ashimba
- Marc Edwards – drums
