= Music Speaks Louder Than Words (James Blood Ulmer album) =

Studio album by James Blood Ulmer
- Released: 1996
- Recorded: December 18 & 19, 1995
- Studio: East Side Sound, New York City
- Genre: Jazz
- Length: 54:24
- Label: DIW; DIW 910
- Producer: James Blood Ulmer, Kazunori Sugiyama

James Blood Ulmer chronology
Knights of Power (1996)	Music Speaks Louder Than Words (1996)	Forbidden Blues (1996)

Music Speaks Louder Than Words (subtitled James Blood Ulmer Plays the Music of Ornette Coleman) is an album by James Blood Ulmer, recorded in 1995 and released on the Japanese DIW label.

== Reception ==
Professional ratings
Review scores
Source	Rating
AllMusic	1.5/5 stars

The AllMusic review by Don Snowden stated that "what an enormous let-down Music Speaks Louder Than Words is in terms of execution ... Ulmer sounds distracted and disinterested, his guitar lines all introverted thumb mumbles and musings played softer than his acoustic rhythm section (and they're being sensitive) ... What a wasted opportunity". In JazzTimes, Bill Milkowski wrote, "Blood always sounds best when he’s skronking over the top of a free flowing, interactive and understated rhythm section... He conjures up that more open-ended vibe on this collection of Ornette Coleman compositions ... when he’s using space dramatically, surfing on top of rolling waves of rhythm, there is no more distinctive and startling sound in jazz guitar. Few other six-stringers can capture the provocative, probing essence and dark beauty of Ornette like Blood". On All About Jazz, Glenn Astarita said, "This is the recording Ulmer fans have been waiting for. The festivities are celebratory! Ulmer is a talented and unique voice on the guitar. Better yet, he swings!... A well balanced affair and highly recommended".

== Track listing ==
All compositions by Ornette Coleman except where noted

1. "Lonely Woman" – 6:50
2. "Elizabeth" – 6:56
3. "Sphinx" – 5:39
4. "Dance in the Dark - Music Is My Life" (James Blood Ulmer) – 5:33
5. "Cherry Cherry" – 7:50
6. "I Can't Take It Anymore" (Ulmer) – 2:58
7. "Street News" – 7:12
8. "Skies of America" – 7:10
9. "Rap Man" (Ulmer) – 4:33

== Personnel ==
- James Blood Ulmer – guitar
- Calvin "Hassēn Truth" Jones – acoustic bass (tracks 1, 3, 5, 7 & 8)
- Amin Ali – electric bass (tracks 2 & 4–6)
- Rashied Ali (tracks 1, 3, 5 & 7), Aubrey Dale (tracks 2, 4–6 & 9) – drums
- Michael Mustafa Ulmer – keyboards (tracks 4, 6 & 9)
