= Perpetual Stroll =

Studio album by Rufus Reid
- Released: 1980
- Recorded: January 27, 1980
- Genre: Jazz
- Length: 49:11
- Label: Theresa TR 111

Rufus Reid chronology
Perpetual Stroll (1980)	Seven Minds (1984)

Perpetual Stroll is an album by the Rufus Reid Trio, a group led by bassist Rufus Reid. It was recorded in 1980 and released on the Theresa label.

== Reception ==
Professional ratings
Review scores
Source	Rating
AllMusic	4/5 stars

In his review for AllMusic, Scott Yanow observed "Since all three musicians have tended to be underrated through the years, this recording served as a excellent showcase for their often overlooked talents".

== Track listing ==
All compositions by Rufus Reid except as indicated

1. "Perpetual Stroll" - 5:57
2. "Waltz for Doris" - 7:01
3. "One Finger Snap" (Herbie Hancock) - 4:54
4. "No Place Is the End of the World" - 9:43
5. "Habiba" (Kirk Lightsey) - 6:22
6. "Tricrotism" (Oscar Pettiford) - 3:55

== Personnel ==
- Rufus Reid - bass
- Kirk Lightsey - piano
- Eddie Gladden - drums
