= Masada: Alef =

Studio album by John Zorn
- Released: 1994
- Recorded: February 20, 1994, RPM, NYC
- Genre: Post-bop; Klezmer
- Length: 60:55
- Label: DIW DIW 888
- Producer: John Zorn, Kazunori Sugiyama

Masada chronology
Masada: Alef (1994)	Masada: Beit (1994)

John Zorn chronology
Execution Ground (1994)	Masada: Alef (1994)	Masada: Beit (1994)

Masada: Alef, also known as א or Masada 1, is a 1994 album by American jazz composer and saxophonist John Zorn featuring the Masada Quartet performing compositions inspired by Zorn's examination of Jewish culture. It was the first album in a project that has included ten studio albums, concerts, and live recordings.

The album takes its inspiration from the mass suicide of Zealots at Masada in 73 CE, and is dedicated to Asher Ginzberg (1856–1927), the founding father of Cultural Zionism.

== Reception ==
Professional ratings
Review scores
Source	Rating
AllMusic	4/5 stars
The Penguin Guide to Jazz	4/4 stars

The AllMusic review by Don Snowden awarded the album four stars stating "Alef is full of thrilling, varied music and just may remind some people who are put off by John Zorn's constant stream of conceptual projects how good a musician he is in a straight-ahead jazz context".

== Track listing ==
1. "Jair" – 4:53
2. "Bith Aneth" – 6:24
3. "Tzofeh" – 5:13
4. "Ashnah" – 6:20
5. "Tahah" – 5:40
6. "Kanah" – 7:26
7. "Delin" – 1:54
8. "Janohah" – 9:40
9. "Zebdi" – 2:45
10. "Idalah-Abal" – 6:15
11. "Zelah" – 3:48

All compositions by John Zorn
- Recorded at RPM in New York City on February 20, 1994

== Personnel ==
Masada

- John Zorn — alto saxophone
- Dave Douglas — trumpet
- Greg Cohen — bass
- Joey Baron — drums
