= Masada: Vav =

Studio album by John Zorn
- Released: 1995
- Recorded: July 16 & 17, 1995, Power Station, NYC
- Genre: Jazz
- Length: 61:02
- Label: DIW DIW 900
- Producer: John Zorn and Kazunori Sugiyama

Masada chronology
Masada: Hei (1995)	Masada: Vav (1995)	Masada: Zayin (1996)

John Zorn chronology
Masada: Hei (1995)	Masada: Vav (1995)	Harras (1995)

Masada: Vav, also known as ו or Masada 6, is a 1995 album by American jazz composer and saxophonist John Zorn released on the Japanese DIW label. It is the sixth album in the Masada project.

== Reception ==
The Allmusic review by Mark Kirschenmann awarded the album 4½ stars stating "John Zorn's writing is particularly focused and well-informed, full of serpentine lines, mixed meters, and sudden shifts in tempo, while leaving plenty of room for collective and individual improvisation. The ensemble and the individual playing are uniformly superb throughout".

Professional ratings
Review scores
Source	Rating
Allmusic	4.5/5 stars

== Track listing ==
All compositions by John Zorn

1. "Debir" – 8:02
2. "Shebuah" – 8:09
3. "Mikreh" – 3:57
4. "Tiferet" – 4:05
5. "Nevalah" – 2:10
6. "Miktav" – 9:40
7. "Nashon" – 8:37
8. "Avelut" – 7:31
9. "Beer Sheba" – 8:50

- Recorded at Power Station in New York City on July 16 and 17, 1995

== Personnel ==
- John Zorn — alto saxophone
- Dave Douglas — trumpet
- Greg Cohen — bass
- Joey Baron — drums
