= Journey to the One =

Studio album by Pharoah Sanders
- Released: 1980
- Recorded: December 1979
- Studio: San Francisco, CA
- Genre: Jazz
- Length: 72:00
- Label: Theresa TR 108/109
- Producer: Pharoah Sanders

Pharoah Sanders chronology
Love Will Find a Way (1977)	Journey to the One (1980)	Beyond a Dream (1981)

Journey to the One is a double album led by saxophonist Pharoah Sanders, recorded in 1979 and released on the Theresa label.

== Reception ==
Professional ratings
Review scores
Source	Rating
AllMusic	4.5/5 stars
Jazzwise	4/5 stars
The Penguin Guide to Jazz Recordings	3/4 stars
The Rolling Stone Jazz & Blues Album Guide	3/5 stars
Uncut	7/10

In his review for AllMusic, Scott Yanow commented: "As usual, Sanders shifts between spiritual peace and violent outbursts in his tenor solos".

The authors of The Penguin Guide to Jazz Recordings called the music "strong, vibrant jazz," and wrote: "What's quickly apparent is that the gentler, more linear and melodic Sanders is not fundamentally different from the high-octane screamer, just differently modulated."

Writing for Jazzwise, Kevin Le Gendre stated: "Backed by a formidable band, Sanders moves seamlessly from tenderness to aggression all the while creating a compelling narrative over the two discs."

Chris May of All About Jazz included Journey to the One in his list of "Alternative Top Ten Albums," calling it "the album that introduced Sanders to a new generation of dancefloor-loving jazz neophytes."

A writer for Billboard praised the album's "superb playing," and noted: "there is something here that transcends labels."

== Track listing ==
All compositions by Pharoah Sanders except where noted

1. "Greetings to Idris" – 7:28
2. "Doktor Pitt" – 12:13
3. "Kazuko" – 8:07
4. "After the Rain" (John Coltrane) – 5:36
5. "Soledad" – 4:56
6. "You've Got to Have Freedom" – 6:48
7. "Yemenja" (John Hicks) – 5:35
8. "It's Easy to Remember" (Lorenz Hart, Richard Rodgers) – 6:32
9. "Think About the One" – 4:15
10. "Bedria" – 10:30

== Personnel ==
- Pharoah Sanders – tenor saxophone, tambura, sleigh bells
- Eddie Henderson – flugelhorn (tracks 2 & 6)
- John Hicks – piano (tracks 1,2 6–8 & 10)
- Joe Bonner – piano, electric piano (track 4 & 9)
- Bedria Sanders – harmonium (track 5)
- Paul Arslanian – harmonium, wind chimes (track 3)
- Mark Isham – synthesizer (track 9)
- James Pomerantz – sitar (track 5)
- Yoko Ito Gates – koto (track 3)
- Chris Hayes (track 10), Carl Lockett (tracks 1,7 & 9) – guitar
- Ray Drummond (tracks 1,2, 6–8 & 10), Joy Julks (track 9) – bass
- Idris Muhammad (tracks 1,2, 6–8 & 10), Randy Merritt (track 9) – drums
- Phil Ford – tabla (track 5)
- Babatunde Lea – shekere, congas (track 9)
- Dee Dee Dickerson, Bobby McFerrin, Vicki Randle, Ngoh Spencer – vocals (tracks 6 & 9)
- Claudette Allen – vocals (track 9)
