= John Hicks (album) =

Studio album by John Hicks
- Recorded: May 1982
- Studio: Different Fur Studios, San Francisco, California
- Genre: Jazz
- Label: Theresa

John Hicks chronology
Some Other Time (1981)	John Hicks (1982)	In Concert (1984)

Professional ratings
Review scores
Source	Rating
AllMusic	3.5/5 stars
The Penguin Guide to Jazz Recordings	3.5/4 stars

John Hicks is an album led by the eponymous pianist, recorded in 1982.

== Recording and music ==
The album was recorded at Different Fur Studios, San Francisco, in May 1982. "This album has four trio numbers with vibraphonist Bobby Hutcherson and bassist Walter Booker, a trio of unaccompanied piano solos, and a piano duet version of the leader's 'After the Morning' which teams Hicks with his wife Olympia."

== Releases ==
John Hicks was released by Theresa Records. It was reissued by Evidence Records with "Beantown Blues", also from May 1982, added.

== Track listing ==
=== Original release ===
1. "Pas De Trois (Dance for Three)"
2. "Steadfast"
3. "For John Chapman"
4. "Star-Crossed Lovers"
5. "Littlest One of All"
6. "After the Morning"
7. "That Ole Devil Called Love"
8. "Gypsy Folk Tales"

=== Reissue ===
For the reissue, one track was added to the eight on the original album:

9. "Beantown Blues"

== Personnel ==
- John Hicks – piano
- Bobby Hutcherson – vibraphone (tracks 1, 3, 5, 8)
- Olympia Hicks – piano (tracks 6, 9)
- Walter Booker – bass (tracks 1, 3, 5, 8)
- Idris Muhammad – drums (track 9)
