= Great Bliss, Vol. 2 =

Studio album by David S. Ware
- Released: 1991
- Recorded: January 8, 9 & 10, 1990
- Studio: Sound on Sound Recording, New York
- Genre: Jazz
- Length: 69:55
- Label: Silkheart
- Producer: David S. Ware

David S. Ware chronology
Great Bliss, Vol. 1 (1991)	Great Bliss, Vol. 2 (1991)	Flight of I (1992)

Great Bliss, Vol. 2 is an album by American jazz saxophonist David S. Ware, the second installment of a two-albums project recorded in 1990 and released on the Swedish Silkheart label. As in the companion Great Bliss, Vol. 1, besides tenor sax Ware plays saxello, stritch and flute.

== Reception ==
Professional ratings
Review scores
Source	Rating
AllMusic	4/5 stars
The Penguin Guide to Jazz	3/4 stars

In his review for AllMusic, Don Snowden states "If you can only have just one, Great Bliss, Vol. 2 is definitely the pick for painting a much better picture of David S. Ware's quartet as a cohesive musical entity."

== Track listing ==
All compositions by David S. Ware

1. "One Two Three" - 12:00
2. "Emptiness" - 4:00
3. "Primary Piece III"- 8:30
4. "Saxelloscape Two" - 5:00
5. "The Child Without - The Child Within" - 10:50
6. "Strichland" - 12:15
7. "Low Strata" - 6:20
8. "Reign of Peace" - 11:00

== Personnel ==
- David S. Ware - flute, tenor sax, saxello, stritch
- Matthew Shipp - piano
- William Parker - bass
- Marc Edwards - drums, tympany, chimes, gongs
