= Kabsha =

Studio album by Idris Muhammad
- Released: 1980
- Recorded: September 12, 1980
- Studio: Van Gelder Studio, Englewood Cliffs NJ
- Genre: Crossover jazz, post-bop
- Length: 49:11
- Label: Theresa TR 110
- Producer: Idris Muhammad

Idris Muhammad chronology
| Make It Count (1980) | Kabsha (1980) | My Turn (1982) |

Kabsha is an album led by drummer Idris Muhammad recorded in 1980 and released on the Theresa label.

== Reception ==
Professional ratings
Review scores
| Source | Rating |
|---|---|
| AllMusic | 4.5/5 stars |

In his review for AllMusic, Scott Yanow stated: "Muhammad, who had often been heard in funky or more commercial settings, really excels in this sparse setting, showing off what he learned from hearing bands in his native New Orleans".

== Track listing ==
All compositions by Idris Muhammed except where noted

1. "Kabsha" - 8:45
2. "I Want To Talk About You" (Billy Eckstine) - 5:13
3. "Little Feet" (Ray Drummond) - 4:49
4. "GCCG Blues" (George Coleman) - 6:13
5. "Soulful Drums" (Jack McDuff, Joseph Thomas) - 4:41
6. "St. M" (Bill Fischer) - 6:14
7. "Kabsha" [Alternate Take] (Muhammad) - 8:00 Bonus track on CD reissue
8. "GCCG Blues" [Alternate Take] (Coleman) - 5:16 Bonus track on CD reissue

== Personnel ==
- Idris Muhammad - drums
- George Coleman (tracks 1, 3, 4, 7 & 8), Pharoah Sanders (tracks 2, 4-6 & 8) - tenor saxophone
- Ray Drummond - bass
