= Pharoah Sanders Live... =

Pharoah Sanders Live…

Live album by Pharoah Sanders
- Released: 1982
- Recorded: April 16–20, 1981
- Genre: Jazz
- Label: Theresa TR 116
- Producer: Pharoah Sanders

Pharoah Sanders chronology
Rejoice (1981)	Pharoah Sanders Live… (1982)	Heart Is a Melody (1983)

Pharoah Sanders Live… is a live album by American saxophonist and composer Pharoah Sanders, released on the Theresa label.

== Reception ==
Professional ratings
Review scores
Source	Rating
AllMusic	4/5 stars
The Penguin Guide to Jazz Recordings	3/4 stars

The AllMusic review by Scott Yanow stated: "The musicianship is at a high level and, although Sanders does not shriek as much as one might hope (the Trane-ish influence was particularly strong during this relatively mellow period), he is in fine form".

The authors of The Penguin Guide to Jazz Recordings praised "Doktor Pitt," noting that it "makes the album," and calling it "a big-voiced, dramatic piece with some of Sanders's best playing from this period."

Jazz Fuel's Matt Fripp included the album in his selection of "Ten Iconic Pharoah Sanders Albums," and commented: "His former mentor John Coltrane is clearly referenced in a straight ballad reading of the standard 'Easy To Remember', whilst a fiery uptempo modal original 'You've Got To Have Freedom' clearly shadows the approach of Coltrane's classic quartet of the early 1960s."

== Track listing ==
All compositions by Pharoah Sanders except as indicated

1. "You Got to Have Freedom" – 14:17
2. "Easy to Remember" (Lorenz Hart, Richard Rodgers) – 6:52
3. "Blues for Santa Cruz" – 8:39
4. "Pharomba" – 13:26
5. "Doktor Pitt" – 21:34 Bonus track on CD reissue
- Tracks 1 & 2 recorded at The Maiden Voyage, Los Angeles, from April 16–19, 1981. Tracks 3 & 4 recorded at the Kuumbwa Jazz Center, Santa Cruz, on April 20, 1981. Track 5 recorded at the Great American Music Hall, San Francisco, on April 12, 1981.

== Personnel ==
- Pharoah Sanders – tenor saxophone, vocals
- John Hicks – piano
- Walter Booker – bass
- Idris Muhammad – drums
