= Great Bliss, Vol. 1 =

Studio album by David S. Ware
- Released: 1991
- Recorded: January 8, 9 & 10, 1990
- Studio: Sound on Sound Recording, New York
- Genre: Jazz
- Length: 72:48
- Label: Silkheart
- Producer: David S. Ware

David S. Ware chronology
Passage to Music (1989)	Great Bliss, Vol. 1 (1991)	Great Bliss, Vol. 2 (1991)

Great Bliss, Vol. 1 is an album by American jazz saxophonist David S. Ware recorded in 1990 and released on the Swedish Silkheart label. Great Bliss was conceived as a two-installment project and marks the debut of the David S. Ware Quartet, one of the most highly acclaimed musical groups of the decade.

== Background ==
The original lineup of the quartet included pianist Matthew Shipp, bassist William Parker and drummer Marc Edwards. Parker and Edwards were the rhythm section on Ware's previous 1988 trio album Passage to Music, but in 1989 Ware was looking for a pianist for adding to the mix. William Parker and Reggie Workman both recommended Matthew Shipp, who was 29 at the time of these recordings, only his second appearance on record (the first was Sonic Explorations, a duo with alto saxophonist Rob Brown released on Cadence Jazz Records). Shipp says "I was a big fan of Ware's work. Playing with Ware is like being at home. My style of piano really fits his compositions. He gives me freedom to be me."

Ware began rehearsing the members of the quartet over three months in advance, and they played for five days straight before heading into the studio. Besides tenor sax Ware plays saxello, a variant of the soprano sax, stritch, a straight alto sax, and for the first time on records flute. "Roland Kirk was really my catalyst to play the flute and the stritch", Ware says.

== Reception ==
Professional ratings
Review scores
Source	Rating
AllMusic	3/5 stars
The Penguin Guide to Jazz	3.5/4 stars

In his review for AllMusic, Don Snowden states "it's safe to say Great Bliss, Vol. 1 is the launching pad for the quartet that helped make the tenor saxophonist's name and reputation."

== Track listing ==
All compositions by David S. Ware

1. "Forward Motion" - 12:28
2. "Angular" - 5:50
3. "Bliss Theme"- 8:50
4. "Cadenza" - 11:40
5. "Sound Bound" - 12:00
6. "Mind Time" - 4:00
7. "Saxelloscape One" - 4:00
8. "Thirds" - 13:50

== Personnel ==
- David S. Ware - flute, tenor sax, saxello, stritch
- Matthew Shipp - piano
- William Parker - bass
- Marc Edwards - drums, tympany, chimes, bells, percussion
