= Masada: Gimel =

Studio album by John Zorn
- Released: 1995
- Recorded: February 20, and June 22, 1994
- Genre: Jazz
- Length: 59:32
- Label: DIW
- Producer: John Zorn, Kazunori Sugiyama

Masada chronology
Masada: Beit (1995)	Masada: Gimel (1995)	Masada: Dalet (1995)

John Zorn chronology
The Art of Memory (1995)	Masada: Gimel (1995)	Masada: Dalet (1995)

Masada: Gimel, also known as ג or Masada 3, is a 1995 album by American composer and saxophonist John Zorn released on the Japanese DIW label. It is the third album of Masada recordings.

== Reception ==
The Allmusic review by Marc Gilman awarded the album 4½ stars stating "At times sounding like an Eastern Ornette Coleman, and sometimes playing with the rampant fury that is characteristic solely of Zorn himself, the band has incorporated and evolved the form of jazz. This album is certainly a highlight of the Masada collection as a whole, and provides a great introduction to the band. Some of the songs can be found reworked on Bar Kokhba as well. There is little more to be said of this album, as the music speaks for itself".

Professional ratings
Review scores
Source	Rating
Allmusic	4.5/5 stars
The Penguin Guide to Jazz	3/4 stars

== Track listing ==
1. "Ziphim" – 9:17
2. "Abidan" – 6:48
3. "Katzatz" – 2:24
4. "Hazor" – 6:04
5. "Netivot" – 3:38
6. "Karaim" – 5:58
7. "Hekhal" – 3:02
8. "Sheloshim" – 8:15
9. "Lebaoth" – 5:12
10. "Tannaim" – 8:54

All compositions by John Zorn.
- Recorded at RPM, New York City on February 20, 1994 and at Power Station, New York City on June 22, 1994

== Personnel ==
Masada

- John Zorn – alto saxophone
- Dave Douglas – trumpet
- Greg Cohen – bass
- Joey Baron – drums
