= Bloodroot (album) =

Studio album by Kelly Moran
- Released: March 24, 2017
- Genre: Contemporary classical; electronic; experimental
- Length: 30:59
- Language: Instrumental
- Label: Telegraph Harp
- Producer: Kelly Moran

Kelly Moran chronology
Optimist (2016)	Bloodroot (2017)	Ultraviolet (2018)

Bloodroot is a 2017 album by Kelly Moran, released on Warp. The album has received positive reviews.

== Recording and release ==
Moran composed the work on a prepared piano which she later modified for the 2018 release Ultraviolet.

== Critical reception ==
Album of the Year sums up the critical consensus as 79 out of 100, based on two reviews. Seth Colter Walls of Pitchfork Media gave the release a 7.8 out of 10 for "melodic ingenuity" with the mix of instruments. In Exclaim!, Kevin Press rated Bloodroot an eight out of 10, calling it "impressive [and] captivating", drawing parallels between several contemporary classical music and avant-garde composers as well as black metal acts.

== Track listing ==
All songs were written by Kelly Moran

1. "Iris" – 1:52
2. "Celandine" – 3:06
3. "Freesia" – 2:22
4. "Hyacinth" – 3:24
5. "Liatris" – 2:10
6. "Bloodroot" – 3:27
7. "Calla" – 1:21
8. "Statice" – 3:21
9. "Aster" – 2:51
10. "Limonium" – 2:01
11. "Heliconia" – 5:04

== Personnel ==
- Kelly Moran – piano, electronics, songwriting, recording, production
- Colin Marston – mastering
- Kevin McKay – cover art

== See also ==
- List of 2017 albums
