= In Concert (John Hicks album) =

Live album by John Hicks
- Released: 1986
- Recorded: August 1984 at Sacramento State University, Half Moon Bay and Kimball's, San Francisco, CA
- Genre: Jazz
- Length: 53:11 CD reissue with bonus tracks
- Label: Theresa TR 123

John Hicks chronology
John Hicks (1982)	In Concert (1986)	Inc. 1 (1985)

In Concert is a live album by American jazz pianist John Hicks recorded in 1984 at various locations around San Francisco and released on the Theresa label in 1986. The 1993 Evidence CD reissue added two bonus tracks.

== Reception ==
Allmusic awarded the album 4 stars calling it "An excellent example of Hicks' playing abilities and an enjoyable set of modern hard bop".

Professional ratings
Review scores
Source	Rating
Allmusic	4/5 stars
The Penguin Guide to Jazz Recordings	3.5/4 stars

== Track listing ==
1. "Some Other Time/Some Other Spring" (Leonard Bernstein, Betty Comden, Adolph Green/Arthur Herzog, Jr., Irene Kitchings) - 7:24
2. "Paul's Pal" (Sonny Rollins) - 13:17
3. "Pas de Trois (Dance for Three)" (Paul Arslanian) - 7:45
4. "Say It (Over and over Again)" (Frank Loesser, Jimmy McHugh) - 4:27
5. "Soul Eyes" (Mal Waldron) - 8:10
6. "Take the Coltrane" (Duke Ellington) - 8:29 Bonus track on CD reissue
7. "Oblivion" (Bud Powell) - 3:39 Bonus track on CD reissue

== Personnel ==
- John Hicks - piano
- Walter Booker - bass
- Idris Muhammad - drums
- Bobby Hutcherson - vibraphone (track 2)
- Elise Wood - flute (track 4)
