= Shukuru =

Studio album by Pharoah Sanders
- Released: 1985
- Recorded: 1981 in Berkeley, CA
- Genre: Jazz
- Length: 42:05
- Label: Theresa TR 121
- Producer: Pharoah Sanders

Pharoah Sanders chronology
Heart is a Melody (1982)	Shukuru (1985)	Africa (1987)

Shukuru is an album led by saxophonist Pharoah Sanders, recorded in 1981 and released on the Theresa label in 1985.

== Reception ==
Professional ratings
Review scores
Source	Rating
AllMusic	3/5 stars
The Penguin Guide to Jazz	3/4 stars
The Rolling Stone Jazz & Blues Album Guide	3/5 stars

In his review for AllMusic, Scott Yanow commented: "Sanders does a close impression of late-'50s John Coltrane on "Body and Soul" and "Too Young to Go Steady" and shows a bit more heat on the other two numbers. But fans of his most passionate dates are advised to get a sampling of the earlier Impulse recordings instead."

The authors of The Penguin Guide to Jazz Recordings stated that Sanders "appears to be rethinking his strategy... turning back to standards-playing for the first time in many years," and noted that "Body and Soul" is "intelligently performed, with few new ideas, but a sympathetic synthesis of much of what has gone on between Byas and Coltrane concentrated into a relatively straightforward melodic response."

== Track listing ==
All compositions by Pharoah Sanders except as indicated

1. "Shukuru" – 5:44
2. "Body and Soul" (Frank Eyton, Johnny Green, Edward Heyman, Robert Sour) – 7:33
3. "Mas in Brooklyn" – 3:41
4. "Sun Song" (Leon Thomas) – 6:04
5. "Too Young to Go Steady" (Harold Adamson, Jimmy McHugh) – 5:21
6. "Jitu" – 5:43
7. "For Big George" (Sanders, Thomas) – 7:59 Bonus track on CD reissue

== Personnel ==
- Pharoah Sanders – tenor saxophone, vocals
- William Henderson – keyboards
- Ray Drummond – bass
- Idris Muhammad – drums
- Leon Thomas – vocals (tracks 3 & 4)
