= Flight of I =

Studio album by David S. Ware
- Released: 1992
- Recorded: December 10 & 11, 1991
- Studio: The Power Station, New York
- Genre: Jazz
- Length: 61:34
- Label: DIW
- Producer: Kazunori Sugiyama

David S. Ware chronology
Great Bliss, Vol. 2 (1991)	Flight of I (1992)	Third Ear Recitation (1993)

Flight of I is an album by American jazz saxophonist David S. Ware recorded in 1991 and released by the Japanese DIW label and through a temporary licensing arrangement in the United States by Columbia Records. This is the last recording of the David S. Ware Quartet's original lineup with drummer Marc Edwards, who would be replaced by Whit Dickey. Unlike previous albums, Ware only plays tenor sax and tackles two of his favorite standards, Harry Warren's "There Will Never Be Another You" and Jerome Kern's "Yesterdays", and the ballad "Sad Eyes", composed by free jazz saxophonist Arthur Jones.

== Reception ==
Professional ratings
Review scores
Source	Rating
AllMusic	4/5 stars
The Penguin Guide to Jazz	4/4 stars

In his review for AllMusic, Thom Jurek states "There is plenty of magic here, and more mystery to be discovered by anyone willing to take a chance on one of the most original tenor players in free jazz." The Penguin Guide to Jazz says that "'Flight of I' and 'Infi-Rhythms' are soaring, prayerful meditations, the saxophone roars and declaims like a storefront preacher, and Shipp plays like a man possessed."

== Track listing ==
All compositions by David S. Ware except as indicated

1. "Aquarian Sound" - 7:51
2. "There Will Never Be Another You" (Harry Warren) - 9:31
3. "Sad Eyes" (Arthur Jones) - 11:12
4. "Flight of I" - 8:15
5. "Yesterdays" (Jerome Kern) - 6:53
6. "Infi-Rhythms #1" - 17:52

== Personnel ==
- David S. Ware - tenor sax
- Matthew Shipp - piano
- William Parker - bass
- Marc Edwards - drums
