= Harmolodic Guitar with Strings =

Studio album by James Blood Ulmer
- Released: 1993
- Recorded: June 29 and July 9 & 18, 1993
- Genre: Jazz
- Label: DIW
- Producer: Kazunori Sugiyama & James Blood Ulmer

James Blood Ulmer chronology
Blues Preacher (1992)	Harmolodic Guitar with Strings (1993)	In the Name of... (1994)

Harmolodic Guitar with Strings is an album by American guitarist James Blood Ulmer recorded in 1993 and released on the Japanese DIW label. The album features Ulmer on guitar with the Indigo String Quartet performing compositions which expand on Ornette Coleman's theory of harmolodics.

== Reception ==
The Allmusic review by Thom Jurek awarded the album 4½ stars, and stated, "Throughout the disc there are surprises and long passages of breathtaking beauty. Ulmer's sound and his approach to notational composition are in line with the most inventive of modern composers. His methodology and musical system may be different and uninterested in academic squabbling about harmony and rhythm, but that's ok — he learned a long time ago that if you don't like the way something works musically all you have to do is make up your own musical system. The European academes have nothing on the soulful, sophisticated musicality presented here".

Professional ratings
Review scores
Source	Rating
Allmusic	4.5/5 stars

== Track listing ==
All compositions by James Blood Ulmer

1. "Opening" – 1:02
2. "Arena: Church" – 2:29
3. "Arena: Seven Gates" – 0:43
4. "Arena: Arena" – 3:38
5. "Arena: Lights Out" – 1:43
6. "Arena: Church II" – 2:24
7. "Arena: Arena II" – 3:03
8. "Page One: In the Name of..." – 2:42
9. "Page One: Page One" – 1:42
10. "Page One: Blood and John" – 3:11
11. "Page One: Page One II" – 0:39
12. "Page One: Grand Finale" – 1:35
13. "Maya" – 10:35
14. "Black Sheep: Prologue" – 0:33
15. "Black Sheep: By-Pass" – 1:53
16. "Black Sheep: Caretaker" – 1:54
17. "Black Sheep: Lost One" – 1:41
18. "Black Sheep: Black Sheep" – 1:03
19. "Black Sheep: Epilogue" – 0:42
20. "Theme From Captain Black" – 7:57

- Recorded at Eastside Sound, NYC on June, 29, July 9 and July 18, 1993

== Personnel ==
- James Blood Ulmer – guitar, vocals
- Gayle Dixon – first violin
- John Blake – second violin
- Ron Lawrence – viola
- Akua Dixon Turre – cello
