= Manhattan Panorama =

Live album by George Coleman
- Released: 1985
- Recorded: 1985 at the Village Vanguard, NYC
- Genre: Jazz
- Length: 40:17
- Label: Theresa TR 120

George Coleman chronology
Playing Changes (1979)	Manhattan Panorama (1985)	At Yoshi's (1989)

Manhattan Panorama is a live album led by saxophonist George Coleman recorded in 1985 at the Village Vanguard and released on the Theresa label.

== Reception ==
Professional ratings
Review scores
Source	Rating
AllMusic	4/5 stars
The Penguin Guide to Jazz Recordings	3/4 stars

In his review for AllMusic, Ron Wynn observed "Other than a good-natured but ultimately empty vocal, Coleman was routinely brilliant on every number during this live Village Vanguard set".

== Track listing ==
All compositions by George Coleman except as indicated

1. "Mayor Koch" – 3:28
2. "New York Suite: I Love New York/Manhattan/How About You?/Harlem Nocturne/Autumn in New York/New York, New York" (Steve Karmen/Richard Rodgers, Lorenz Hart/Ralph Freed, Burton Lane/Earle Hagen, Dick Rogers/Vernon Duke/Fred Ebb, John Kander) – 19:12
3. "Subway Ride" – 6:09
4. "El Barrio" – 6:00
5. "New York Housing Blues" – 9:36
6. "Ray of Light" (Consuela Lee Morehead) – 15:04 Bonus track on CD reissue

== Personnel ==
- George Coleman – tenor saxophone, alto saxophone, vocals
- Harold Mabern – piano
- Jamil Nasser – bass
- Idris Muhammad – drums
