= Don't Trust Mirrors =

Studio album by Kelly Moran
- Released: October 1, 2025
- Genre: Experimental
- Length: 40:44
- Label: Warp
- Producer: Kelly Moran

Kelly Moran chronology
Moves in the Field (2024)	Don't Trust Mirrors (2025)

Don't Trust Mirrors is a studio album by American composer and pianist Kelly Moran. It was released on October 1, 2025, through Warp Records. It received generally favorable reviews from critics.

== Background ==
Kelly Moran is an American composer and pianist. Don't Trust Mirrors is a follow-up to Moves in the Field (2024). It took six years for her to finish the album. The album's title track features a guest appearance from Bibio. A music video was released for the track "Echo in the Field". The album was released on October 1, 2025, through Warp Records.

== Critical reception ==
Professional ratings
Aggregate scores
Source	Rating
Metacritic	74/100
Review scores
Source	Rating
Clash	8/10
Pitchfork	7.6/10
Record Collector	3/5 stars
Uncut	7/10

According to the review aggregator Metacritic, Don't Trust Mirrors received "generally favorable reviews" based on a weighted average score of 74 out of 100 from 5 critic scores.

Daniel Dylan Wray of Uncut wrote, "The balance between deftness and density underpins much of the record, as light and airy as it is atmospheric and tactile." Dave Segal of Spin described it as "a deceptively pretty album in which all of the experiments succeed." Robin Murray of Clash stated, "A hypnotic experience, Don't Trust Mirrors is a record to lose yourself in."

=== Accolades ===
Year-end lists for Don't Trust Mirrors
Publication	List	Rank	Ref.
PopMatters	The 20 Best Experimental Albums of 2025	8	
The Quietus	The Quietus Albums of the Year 2025	74	

== Track listing ==
All tracks are written by Kelly Moran.

Don't Trust Mirrors track listing
No.	Title	Length
1.	"Echo in the Field"	4:38
2.	"Prism Drift"	4:50
3.	"Sans Sodalis"	3:35
4.	"Don't Trust Mirrors" (featuring Bibio)	4:54
5.	"Lunar Wave"	3:23
6.	"Chrysalis"	3:01
7.	"Systems"	4:28
8.	"Reappearing"	5:27
9.	"Above the Vapours"	2:06
10.	"Cathedral"	4:06
Total length:		40:44

== Personnel ==
Credits adapted from liner notes.

- Kelly Moran – production, recording
- Bibio – guest appearance (4)
- Gabe Schuman – additional production (5, 6), mixing
- Joshua Eustis – mastering
- Katharine Antoun – creative direction, design, photography
- Larkin Donley – photography
