= Rejoice (Pharoah Sanders album) =

Studio album by Pharoah Sanders
- Released: 1981
- Recorded: 1981
- Genre: Jazz
- Length: 62:52
- Label: Theresa TR 112/113

Pharoah Sanders chronology
Beyond a Dream (1981)	Rejoice (1981)	Pharoah Sanders Live... (1982)

Rejoice is a double album led by saxophonist Pharoah Sanders, recorded in 1981 and released on the Theresa label.

== Reception ==
Professional ratings
Review scores
Source	Rating
AllMusic	4.5/5 stars
The Penguin Guide to Jazz Recordings	3/4 stars
The Rolling Stone Jazz & Blues Album Guide	3/5 stars
UK Vibe	4/5 stars
The Virgin Encyclopedia of Jazz	3/5 stars

In his review for AllMusic, Scott Yanow commented: "The music always holds on to one's interest, making this one of Sanders's better later recordings".

The authors of The Penguin Guide to Jazz Recordings stated that the album is "cluttered by spurious vocals, but packed with interesting episodes," and noted that "the basic group is hard to fault, but it's rarely heard in isolation and there is always someone running interference."

Imran Mirza of UK Vibe remarked: "Rejoice lovingly strives for that notion of celebration, achieving it almost immediately... this is an album that embraces its 80s surrounding soundscape, particularly during the album’s early portion of highlife songs."

Writing for Jazz Journal, Derek Ansell noted that, on the opening track, "Sanders is full of complex, high-octane improvising," while the succeeding tracks present "a more mellow, mature Sanders... sounding at times like a supercharged Sonny Rollins doing his calypso thing."

== Track listing ==
All compositions by Pharoah Sanders except as indicated

1. "Rejoice" – 12:42
2. "High Life" – 7:38
3. "Nigerian Juju Hilife" – 9:57
4. "Origin" – 5:41
5. "When Lights Are Low" (Benny Carter) – 6:24
6. "Moment's Notice" (John Coltrane) – 5:16
7. "Central Park West" (John Coltrane) – 5:43
8. "Ntjilo Ntjilo/Bird Song" – 4:03
9. "Farah" – 5:28

== Personnel ==
- Pharoah Sanders – tenor saxophone, bells, vocals
- Danny Moore – trumpet (tracks 4–7)
- Steve Turre – trombone (tracks 4–7)
- Lois Colin – harp (tracks 7 & 8)
- Bobby Hutcherson – vibraphone (tracks 1, 4, 6 & 7)
- John Hicks – piano (tracks 4–7)
- Joe Bonner – piano, vocals (tracks 1–3 8 & 9)
- Peter Fujii – guitar, vocals (track 2 & 3)
- Art Davis – bass (tracks 1 & 4–7)
- Jorge Pomar – bass, vocals (tracks 2 & 3)
- Elvin Jones (track 1), Billy Higgins (tracks 4–7) – drums
- Big Black – congas, vocals (tracks 2 & 3)
- Babatunde Lea – bells, drums, shekere, vocals (tracks 1–3)
- George V. Johnson Jr. – vocals (track 6)
- B. Kazuko Ishida – voice (track 1)
- Flame Braithwaite, Bobby London, Sakinah Muhammad, Carroll Wilson Scott, Yvette S. Vanterpool – vocals (tracks 4 & 7)
- William S. Fischer (vocal arranger (tracks 4 & 7)
