= Theresa Records =

Jazz record label based in California

Theresa Records was a jazz record company and label established in 1975 by Allen Pittman and B. Kazuko Ishida in El Cerrito, California. Its catalogue included Pharoah Sanders, George Coleman, and John Hicks. In the early 1990s Evidence Music bought the back catalogue and reissued it on CD.

== Discography ==
- 101: Bishop Norman Williams – The Bishop (1976)
- 102: Bishop Norman Williams – Bishop's Bag (1978)
- 103: Ed Kelly – Music from the Black Museum (1977)
- 104: David Hardiman – It'll Be All Right (1978)
- 105: Bishop Norman Williams – One for Bird (1979)
- 106: Ed Kelly – And Friend (1979)
- 107: Babatunde Lea – Levels of Consciousness (1979)
- 108/109: Pharoah Sanders – Journey to the One (1980)
- 110: Idris Muhammad – Kabsha (1980)
- 111: Rufus Reid – Perpetual Stroll (1980)
- 112/113: Pharoah Sanders – Rejoice (1981)
- 114: Joe Bonner – Impressions of Copenhagen (1981)
- 115: John Hicks – Some Other Time (1981)
- 116: Pharoah Sanders – Pharoah Sanders Live... (1982)
- 117: Nat Adderley – On the Move (1983)
- 118: Pharoah Sanders – Heart is a Melody (1983)
- 119: John Hicks – John Hicks (1984)
- 120: George Coleman – Manhattan Panorama (1984)
- 121: Pharoah Sanders – Shukuru (1985)
- 122: Nat Adderley – Blue Autumn (1983)
- 123: John Hicks – In Concert (1984)
- 124: Bobby Hutcherson – Farewell Keystone (1982)
- 125: Joe Bonner – New Beginnings (1988)
- 126: George Coleman – At Yoshi's (1989)
- 127: Pharoah Sanders – A Prayer Before Dawn (1987)
- 128: John Hicks & Ray Drummond – Two of a Kind (1988)
- 129: Cedar Walton – Among Friends (1982)
