= Cellular Chaos =

American rock band

Cellular Chaos is an American noise-punk band from Brooklyn New York that was founded by Weasel Walter. Music journalist Brad Cohan described the band's status as such:

"Cellular Chaos, black sheep of Brooklyn’s DIY noise-punk underground, have trudged on through myriad iterations, losing bassists at a furious clip and trading in drummers for drum machines while going label-less for a bulk of their lifespan. Still, these provocateurs have managed to churn out their gnarly and sweaty mishmash of glam raunch, rock histrionics and no wave noise-fuckery with a take-no-prisoners attitude.

Despite the roadblocks, Flying Luttenbachers mastermind Weasel Walter and vocalist Admiral Grey, the two constants of Cellular Chaos since its inception a half decade or so ago, have persevered, shoring up their lineup recently with drummer Rad Chaines and signing on with noise-rock institution Skin Graft Records.

That union has yielded fruit in the form of their Skin Graft debut, Diamond Teeth Clenched, a scorched-earth statement propelled by animalistic wailing, neck-snapping guitar blowouts and a rhythm section (the since-departed bass/drums combo of Shayna Dulberger and Marc Edwards) to die for."

== Background ==
Cellular Chaos was originally a trio, with Walter, Kevin Shea, and Ceci Moss. Marc Edwards joined in 2010, and singer Admiral Grey was recruited in 2012. After a short stint with Kelly Moran replacing Ceci Moss on bass, Shayna Dulberger joined on bass in 2013. The band added Rad Chaines on digital and live percussion in 2018, using synthesized bass for this period. After a hiatus in 2020, Adam Shead joined on drums and Rad Chaines moved to bass guitar.

== Discography ==
- 2011 - demo
- 2012 - Cellular Chaos EP
- 2013 - Cellular Chaos LP
- 2016 - Diamond Teeth Clenched LP

== Members ==
- Weasel Walter - guitar
- Admiral Grey - vocals
- Rad Chaines - bass guitar
- Adam Shead - drums

=== Past members ===
- Ceci Moss - bass (2010-2012)
- Kelly Moran - bass (2012-2013)
- Shayna Dulberger - bass (2013-2017)
- Marc Edwards - drums (2010-2014)
- Kevin Shea (2010)
