= Mabern's Grooveyard =

Studio album by Harold Mabern
- Released: 1998
- Recorded: August 20–21, 1996
- Studio: Avatar, New York City
- Genre: Jazz
- Label: DIW
- Producer: James Williams, Kazunori Sugiyama

Mabern's Grooveyard is an album by pianist Harold Mabern. It was recorded in 1996 and released by DIW Records two years later.

== Recording and music ==
The album was recorded on August 20 and 21, 1996, at Avatar Studios in New York. It was produced by James Williams and Kazunori Sugiyama. The personnel are Harold Mabern (piano), Christian McBride (bass), and Tony Reedus (drums).

The material is "a set of off-the-beaten track tunes", plus "AON", an original. The first three tracks "progress in tempo and feeling from medium groove to hurtling groove". Mabern plays "Jeanine" "with pulsing, light-fingered percussiveness, from the treble repeat in the head through a riff-laden and unusually fitting fade-out". "East of the Sun" has a bossa nova arrangement.

== Release and reception ==
Professional ratings
Review scores
Source	Rating
The Penguin Guide to Jazz	4/4 stars

Mabern's Grooveyard was released by DIW Records in 1998. In that year, critic Gary Giddins wrote of Mabern's album that it was "perhaps his most satisfying to date".

== Track listing ==
1. "Grooveyard"
2. "Ladybird"
3. "Jeanine"
4. "A Hundred Years from Today"
5. "Minority"
6. "After Hours"
7. "East of the Sun"
8. "AON"
9. "Bubbles, Bangles & Beads"

== Personnel ==
- Harold Mabern – piano
- Christian McBride – bass
- Tony Reedus – drums
