= Some Other Time (album) =

Studio album by John Hicks
- Released: 1981
- Recorded: April 14, 1981 at The Automatt Recording Studios, San Francisco, CA
- Genre: Jazz
- Length: 51:45 CD reissue with bonus tracks
- Label: Theresa TR 115

John Hicks chronology
| After the Morning (1979) | Some Other Time (1981) | John Hicks (1982) |

Some Other Time is an album by American jazz pianist John Hicks recorded in 1981 and released on the Theresa label. The 1995 Evidence CD reissue added three bonus tracks.

== Reception ==
Allmusic awarded the album 3 stars stating "A flexible jazz pianist who can fit in comfortably in settings ranging from bop to fairly free, John Hicks is in excellent form during this straightforward set".

Professional ratings
Review scores
| Source | Rating |
|---|---|
| Allmusic | 3/5 stars |
| The Penguin Guide to Jazz Recordings | 3/4 stars |

== Track listing ==
All compositions by John Hicks except as indicated

1. "Naima's Love Song" - 6:16
2. "Mind Wine" - 3:35
3. "Peanut Butter in the Desert" - 4:52
4. "Ghost of Yesterday" (Arthur Herzog Jr., Irene Kitchings) - 3:53
5. "Some Other Time" (Leonard Bernstein, Betty Comden, Adolph Green) - 2:27
6. "With Malice Toward None" (Tom McIntosh) - 4:47
7. "Dark Side, Light Side" (George Cables) - 7:22
8. "Night Journey" (Tex Allen) - 6:30 Bonus track on CD reissue
9. "After the Morning" - 7:37 Bonus track on CD reissue
10. "Epistrophy" (Kenny Clarke, Thelonious Monk) - 4:16 Bonus track on CD reissue
- tracks 8 & 9 recorded on May 19, 1982, at Different Fur Studios, San Francisco, CA, track 10 recorded on August 13, 1984, in San Francisco, CA

== Personnel ==
- John Hicks - piano
- Walter Booker - bass (tracks 1–3, 6–8 & 10)
- Idris Muhammad - drums (tracks 1–3, 6–8 & 10)
- Olympia Hicks - piano (track 9)
