= Blues Preacher =

Studio album by James Blood Ulmer
- Released: 1993
- Recorded: September–November, 1992
- Genre: Jazz, blues
- Label: DIW
- Producer: Kazunori Sugiyama, James Blood Ulmer

James Blood Ulmer chronology
Black and Blues (1990)	Blues Preacher (1993)	Harmolodic Guitar with Strings (1993)

DIW Records Cover

Blues Preacher is an album by the American guitarist James Blood Ulmer, recorded in 1992 and released in Japan on DIW Records and in the US on Columbia/DIW. It was released in North America in 1994.

== Production ==
Ulmer built the album around the drums, which he recorded with guitar and bass; he then rerecorded the guitar and bass parts once he was satisfied with the drum track. Ulmer played a Steinberger on Blues Preacher. "Jazz Is the Teacher (Funk the Preacher)" is a slower version of an older Ulmer song.

== Reception ==
Professional ratings
Review scores
Source	Rating
AllMusic	1.5/5 stars
The Indianapolis Star	3/4 stars
Orlando Sentinel	4/5 stars
(The New) Rolling Stone Album Guide	3/5 stars

Trouser Press wrote that "the record places the emphasis on Blood's vocals amid unwavering rock and funk rhythms and more faux-metal guitars." The Austin American-Statesman opined that "Ullmer's version of the [blues], full of crunching guitar chords and throat-ripping vocals, is well off the beaten path as idiosyncratic song structures and sermonizing lyrics take the music to new locations."

The Indianapolis Star praised Ronald Drayton's "dazzling—and sometimes psychedelic—guitar variations and juxtapositions." The Orlando Sentinel wrote that "Nobody but You" "is a gorgeous, Jimi Hendrix-style love ballad punctured by poison-tipped guitar licks—with Ulmer playing flute in a funky interlude." Stereo Review noted that "in the noble tradition of early rock-and-roll, the words to some of the songs are so slurred and muffled as to be open to conjecture."

The AllMusic review by Scott Yanow stated: "Ulmer sticks to a harsh blues-rock groove, with many of the one-chord vamps sounding like they are leftovers from John Lee Hooker's repertoire. There are no harmolodics (and little jazz) to be heard on the CD, and this rather primitive music is to be recommended only to fans of Ulmer's shouting vocals."

== Track listing ==
All compositions by James Blood Ulmer

1. "Cheering" – 6:45
2. "Alone to Wonder" – 6:17
3. "Let Me Take You Home" – 5:15
4. "Who Let the Cat Out of the Bag?" – 4:37
5. "Jazz Is the Teacher (Funk the Preacher)" – 6:45
6. "Justice for Us All" – 5:05
7. "Nobody but You" – 5:40
8. "Blues Allnight" – 6:30
9. "Get Up" – 7:35
10. "Angel" – 7:05
- Recorded at Sound On Sound, NYC, in September through November, 1992

== Personnel ==
- James Blood Ulmer – guitar, vocals
- Mark E. Peterson – bass (tracks 1–9)
- Ronald Drayton – guitar (tracks 1–9)
- Aubrey Dayle – drums
- William "Spaceman" Patterson – synthesizer, drums, keyboards (track 10)
- Delmar Brown – keyboards (track 10)
- Irene Datcher – vocals (track 10)
