= Ultraviolet (Kelly Moran album) =

2018 Kelly Moran album

Studio album by Kelly Moran
- Released: November 2, 2018
- Recorded: 2018
- Genres: Contemporary classical; electronic; experimental
- Length: 44:58
- Language: Instrumental
- Label: Warp
- Producers: Kelly Moran; Daniel Lopatin

Kelly Moran chronology
Bloodroot (2017)	Ultraviolet (2018)	Origin EP (2019)

Ultraviolet is a 2018 album by Kelly Moran, released on Warp. The album has received positive reviews.

== Recording and release ==
I am trying to obfuscate exactly what the piano sounds like. The whole point is to make it sound different.

— Kelly Moran, 2018

Ultraviolet is the first release by Moran on Warp. Moran was inspired by the sounds of nature and tried to reproduce them on the recording. She went to the prepared piano she has used on 2017's Bloodroot and improved with the instrument, adding synthesizer later.

=== Music video ===
On April 8, 2018, Moran released the music video to "Water Music". Directed by Katharine Antoun, the video shows a montage of meditative abstract imagery: iridescent splashes of color produced by Turkish marbling, microscopic footage of cellular activity, Moran’s own face and hands, and an uncanny CGI blob. Andy Cush of Spin explained: "With deft editing, the visuals become more than screensaver-ish visual ambience, tracking the rising tension of the sounds with increasingly quick cuts between images."

== Critical reception ==
Professional ratings
Aggregate scores
Source	Rating
Metacritic	81/100
Review scores
Source	Rating
AllMusic	3.5/5 stars
Exclaim!	9/10
MusicOMH	3.5/5 stars
PopMatters	9/10
Pitchfork Media	7.6/10
Tiny Mix Tapes	4/5
Under the Radar	7/10

According to the review aggregator Metacritic, Ultraviolet received "universal acclaim" based on a weighted average score of 81 out of 100 from 10 critic scores. Pitchfork Media's Philip Sherburne gave the album 7.6 out of 10, summing up his review, "The excess is thrilling. It’s here where Moran feels the most unfettered and uninhibited—not just balancing opposing forces, but reveling in their collision and savoring the way the frequencies fly, like raindrops buffeted by gusts of wind." Evan Coral at Tiny Mix Tapes gave the album four out of five, with a review that is itself written in a post-modern style, highlighting Moran's inspiration from John Cage and emphasizing her innovation with a prepared piano. Paul Simpson of AllMusicGuide also referenced her innovation at piano preparation in his review, giving the album 3.5 out of five, saying the work is "far more expressive than one might expect from an album of prepared piano music". Regarding her inspiration to post-minimalism, Spyros Stasis of PopMatters ends his nine out of 10 review writing, "Starting from a minimal perspective, with a solitary piano as the main guide through this journey, she can awaken a pronounced ethereal and light characteristic, but further infuse it with a darker element." Exclaim!'s Tom Beedham also gave it a nine out of 10 and contrasted the album's influences in his assessment: "Ultraviolet is indebted to the charm of the natural world, but with it, Moran unlocks dazzling new ones in the process, keys jammed firmly between the strings of her instrument".

=== Accolades ===
Accolades for Ultraviolet
Publication	Accolade	Rank
Exclaim!	Exclaim!'s Top 10 Experimental and Modern Composition Albums of 2018	8
Gigwise	Gigwise's Top 51 Albums of 2018	7
Paste	Paste's Top 50 Albums of 2018	40
Pitchfork	Pitchfork's Top Experimental Albums of 2018	N/A
PopMatters	PopMatters' Top 70 Albums of 2018	41
PopMatters	PopMatters' Top 25 Electronic Albums of 2018	14
PopMatters	PopMatters' Top 20 Avant-Garde and Experimental Albums of 2018	14
Spin	Spin's Top 51 Albums of 2018	33
Time Out New York	Time Out New York's Top 16 Albums of 2018	N/A

== Track listing ==
All songs written by Kelly Moran

1. "Autowave" – 3:09
2. "Helix" – 8:48
3. "Water Music" – 6:29
4. "Nereid" – 10:07
5. "In Parallel" – 6:20
6. "Halogen" – 7:15
7. "Radian" – 2:50

== Personnel ==
- Kelly Moran – piano, songwriting, production
- Dina Chang at Setta Studio, New York City, New York, United States – photography
- Katharine Hayden – digital retouching
- Heba Kadry – mastering
- Lafont London – graphic design
- Daniel Lopatin – synthesizer and additional production on "Helix", "Water Music", and "Nereid"
- Gabriel Schuman – engineering
- Tim Saccenti at Setta Studio – photography, creative direction
- Chris Tabron at Red Bull Studios, New York City, New York, United States – mixing

== See also ==
- List of 2018 albums
