= At Yoshi's =

Live album by George Coleman
- Released: 1989
- Recorded: 1989 at Yoshi's in Oakland, CA
- Genre: Jazz
- Length: 66:49
- Label: Theresa TR 126
- Producer: George Coleman

George Coleman chronology
Manhattan Panorama (1979)	At Yoshi's (1989)	Convergence (1990)

At Yoshi's is a live album by saxophonist George Coleman recorded in 1989 at Yoshi's in Oakland, California and released on the Theresa label. It was later issued on CD by the Evidence label.

== Reception ==
Professional ratings
Review scores
Source	Rating
AllMusic	4.5/5 stars
The Penguin Guide to Jazz Recordings	3/4 stars

In his review for AllMusic, Michael G. Nastos observed: "the whole CD from top to bottom has Coleman and his band inspired to the hilt and playing their best, and At Yoshi's is a highly recommended effort that deserves a space on each and every jazz lover's shelf".

== Track listing ==
All compositions by George Coleman, except as indicated

1. "They Say It's Wonderful" (Irving Berlin) - 11:24
2. "Good Morning Heartache" (Ervin Drake, Dan Fisher, Irene Higginbotham) - 8:38
3. "Laig Gobblin' Blues" - 4:05
4. "Io" (Paul Arslanian) - 6:36
5. "Up Jumped Spring" (Freddie Hubbard) - 12:14
6. "Father" - 7:10 Bonus track on CD reissue
7. "Soul Eyes" (Mal Waldron) - 16:42 Bonus track on CD reissue

== Personnel ==
- George Coleman - tenor saxophone
- Harold Mabern - piano
- Ray Drummond - bass
- Alvin Queen - drums
