= Masada: Hei =

Studio album by John Zorn
- Released: 1995
- Recorded: July 16 & 17, 1995
- Studio: Power Station, New York City
- Genre: Jazz
- Length: 57:11
- Label: DIW DIW 899
- Producer: John Zorn, Kazunori Sugiyama

Masada chronology
Masada: Dalet (1994)	Masada: Hei (1995)	Masada: Vav (1995)

John Zorn chronology
Filmworks II: Music for an Untitled Film by Walter Hill (1995)	Masada: Hei (1995)	Masada: Vav (1995)

Masada: Hei, also known as ה or Masada 5, is a 1995 album by American composer and saxophonist John Zorn. It is the fifth album of Masada recordings.

== Reception ==
The Allmusic review by David Freedlander awarded the album 4 stars stating "Hei, the fifth release from John Zorn's Masada Quartet, shows the band at their tightest and most agile".

Professional ratings
Review scores
Source	Rating
Allmusic	4/5 stars

== Track listing ==
All compositions by John Zorn.

1. "Paran" - 5:12
2. "Halisah" - 6:27
3. "Yoreh" - 6:50
4. "Beeroth" - 4:13
5. "Hobah" - 11:38
6. "Neshamah" - 6:06
7. "Lakom" - 3:11 - misspelled as "Lakum" on album sleeve
8. "Makedah" - 8:36
9. "Hafla'ah" - 4:55

- Recorded at Power Station in New York City on July 16 and 17, 1995

== Personnel ==
Masada

- John Zorn – alto saxophone
- Dave Douglas – trumpet
- Greg Cohen – bass
- Joey Baron – drums
