= Ernest Anderson III =

- Genres: Jazz
- Occupation(s): Guitarist, bassist
- Instrument: Guitar

Ernest Anderson III is a New York City based jazz guitarist and bassist. He has played with or done recordings with Rhys Chatham, is a frequent collaborator of Martin Bisi, and is currently a member of Marc Edwards Slipstream Time Travel.
