= In the Name of... =

Studio album by Music Revelation Ensemble
- Released: 1994
- Recorded: December 6 & 7, 1993
- Studio: East Side Sound, New York City
- Genre: Jazz
- Length: 59:49
- Label: DIW; DIW 885
- Producer: James Blood Ulmer & Kazunori Sugiyama

Music Revelation Ensemble chronology
After Dark (1992)	In the Name of... (1994)	Knights of Power (1996)

James Blood Ulmer chronology
Harmolodic Guitar with Strings (1993)	In the Name of... (1994)	Live at the Bayerischer Hof (1994)

In the Name of... is an album by guitarist James Blood Ulmer's Music Revelation Ensemble, featuring bass guitarist Amin Ali and drummer Cornell Rochester, with guest saxophonists Sam Rivers, Arthur Blythe and Hamiet Bluiett, recorded in 1993 and released on the Japanese DIW label.

== Reception ==
Professional ratings
Review scores
Source	Rating
AllMusic	4/5 stars
Robert Christgau	A−

AllMusic reviewer Bret Love wrote, "The extremely busy soloing and dissonant arrangements may prove taxing for casual jazz fans, but In the Name Of... is sure to please fans of the free jazz sound". Critic Robert Christgau awarded the album an "A−".

== Track listing ==
All compositions by James Blood Ulmer

1. "In Time" – 8:10
2. "Non-Believer" – 10:38
3. "The Dawn" – 8:09
4. "Mankind" – 9:28
5. "Help" – 8:37
6. "Abundance" – 6:13
7. "Purity" – 7:49

== Personnel ==
- James Blood Ulmer – guitar
- Amin Ali – electric bass
- Cornell Rochester – drums
- Sam Rivers – soprano saxophone (track 1), tenor saxophone (track 5), flute (track 4)
- Arthur Blythe – alto saxophone (tracks 2, 6 & 7)
- Hamiet Bluiett – baritone saxophone (track 3)
