= Sketches of Tokyo =

Studio album by David Murray & John Hicks
- Released: 1986
- Recorded: April 11, 1985
- Genre: Jazz
- Length: 44:49
- Label: DIW; DIW 812
- Producer: John Hicks

David Murray chronology
Children (1986)	Sketches of Tokyo (1986)	New Life (1986)

John Hicks chronology
Inc. 1 (1985)	Sketches of Tokyo (1985)	Two of a Kind (1986–87)

Sketches of Tokyo is an album by John Hicks and David Murray released on the Japanese DIW label. It was released in 1986 and features six duo performances by Murray and Hicks.

== Reception ==
The Allmusic review awarded the album 4 stars.

Professional ratings
Review scores
Source	Rating
Allmusic	4/5 stars

== Track listing ==
1. "Epistrophy" (Monk) - 4:26
2. "Blues In The Pocket" (Hicks) - 7:40
3. "Naima" (Coltrane) 9:16
4. "New Life" (Murray) - 8:38
5. "God Bless The Child" (Herzog, Holliday) - 7:41
6. "Sketches of Tokyo" (Hicks) - 7:08

- Recorded April 11, 1985 at Avaco Studio, Tokyo

== Personnel ==
- David Murray - tenor saxophone, bass clarinet
- John Hicks - piano
