= Takuma Kanaiwa =

- Born: New York City
- Genres: jazz
- Instrument: guitar

Takuma Kanaiwa is a New York City based musician and electrical engineer. His music is known for transcending genres such as free jazz and Japanese folk. He also manufactures guitar effects pedals.

== Partial discography ==
- The Lemurian Sounds of Takuma Kanaiwa
- Pegado Aficionado
- Djoukojou
- Seeds of Djuke
