= Marc Edwards (drummer) =

American drummer

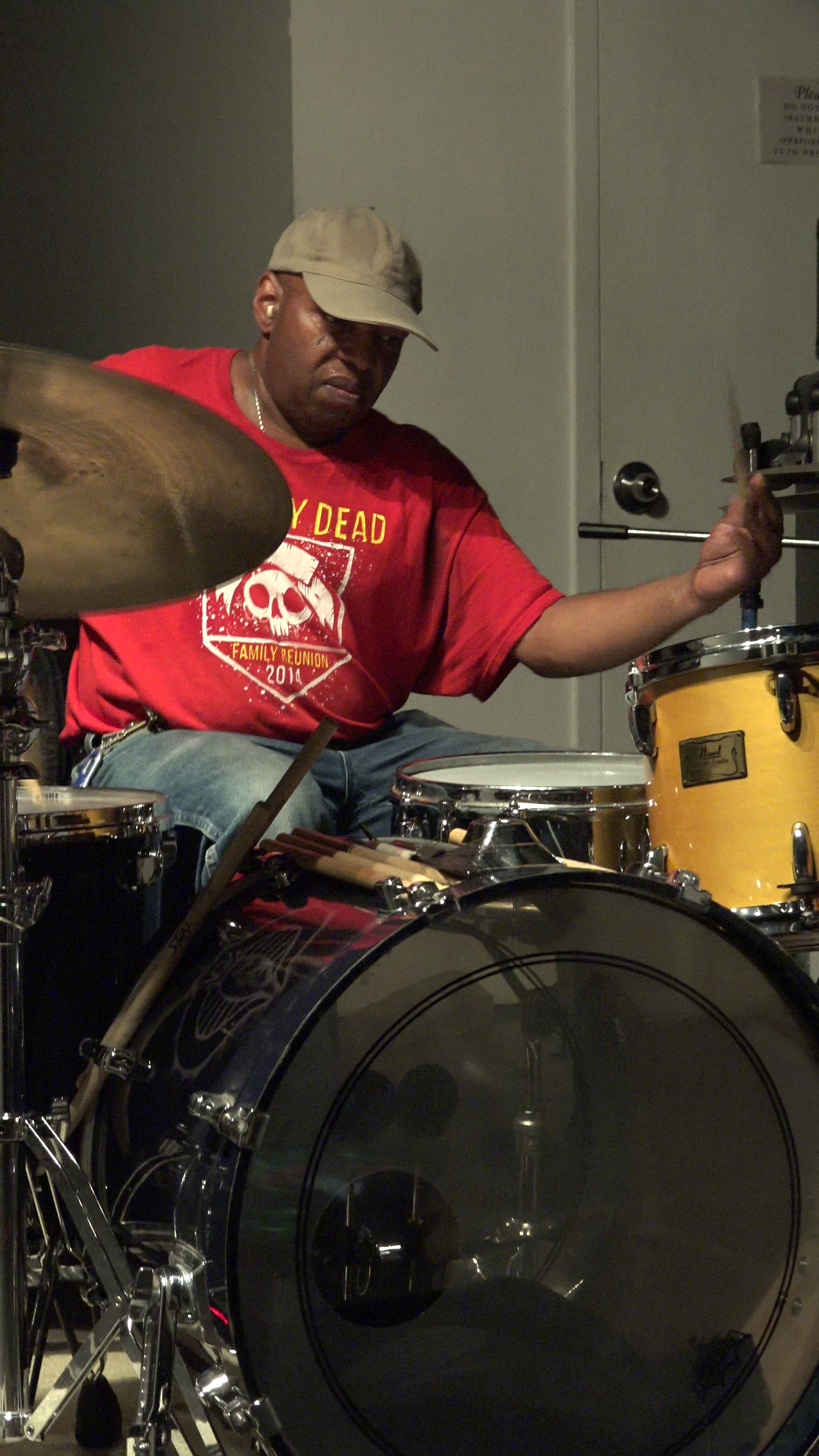

Background information
- Born: July 23, 1949 (age 76); New York City
- Genres: free jazz
- Instrument: drums

Marc Edwards (born July 23, 1949) is a free jazz drummer who has played and recorded with artists such as Cecil Taylor, Charles Gayle, and David S. Ware. His influences include Charlie Parker and Buddy Rich. He is currently playing with a project with Weasel Walter, and with his own group, Marc Edwards Slipstream Time Travel, an afrofuturistic free jazz ensemble. Many of his solo works have a science fiction theme. He also plays in the band Cellular Chaos, his first foray into rock drumming.

== Biography ==
Edwards was raised in New York City, and did not initially take an interest in music. He dabbled with several instruments, but it was during junior high school when he was able to get out of wood shop class by playing drums that he first played the instrument.

In 1994. Edwards returned to music after a lengthy hiatus. He formed Slipstream Time Travel and released their first record, Time and Space Vol. 1. Current members are Ernest Anderson III, Takuma Kanaiwa, Alex Lozupone, Gene Janas, Alexis Marcelo. This line-up's performance at the Dizzy Gillespie Fundraiser of 2012 was described as "a climactic point in the evening’s program ".

Edwards was interviewed on WKCR New York City after the release of Time & Space, Vol. 1 and Red Sprites & Blue Jets. During the 1970s, Apogee performed live on the station two separate occasions. His trio with Sabir Mateen and Hilliard Greene, performed at WKCR again just before playing at the Knitting Factory's sponsored festival, the Texaco Jazz Festival in 1997.

In 2013, Marc Edwards contributed a version of "Amazing Grace" to a benefit album to raise funds for Donovan Drayton's release from prison and trial. He also released a CD with his new group Sonos Gravis, which was described as "freely fused out rock that takes "free jazz" and cranks it." The album was listed as #12 on Steve Holtje's Top Jazz albums of 2013, along with his release with Slipstream Time Travel called Planet X Just Blew Up!, which was #13. The New York City Jazz Record says that "Sonos Gravis could, in fact, be the conceptual merger of the New York Art Quartet, Black Sabbath and Last Exit, though despite signposts reflecting noise and free jazz, this music has little actual precedent".

Grego Applegate Edwards described his 2014 release, Sakura Sakura, as "very vibrant free rock, a sort of Ascension in the metal zone. It is bracing. You will either gravitate towards it by predisposition or not. And that has something to do with your open mind about a free metal blast or the opposite." He says of the 2015 release, Mystic Mountain, “This may be their most anarchically exhilarating album yet!”.

For many years, Edwards played only jazz drums, but recently has started playing rock and punk.

== Discography ==
See Marc Edwards discography
