= Sacred Common Ground =

Studio album by Don Pullen
- Released: 1995
- Recorded: March 8 and 9, 1995
- Studios: The Power Station, New York City
- Genre: Jazz
- Length: 46:34
- Labels: Blue Note; CDP 7243 8 32800 2 5
- Producer: Michael Cuscuna

Don Pullen chronology
Live...Again: Live at Montreux (1993)	Sacred Common Ground (1995)

Sacred Common Ground is a 1995 album by pianist and composer Don Pullen. Recorded shortly before his death, it combines the forces of his African Brazilian Connection ensemble with a group of Native American musicians.

== Background ==
Pullen first heard Native American music performed live in 1992, and responded enthusiastically, expressing a desire to find a way to combine it with jazz. He was soon awarded a commission, funded by the Lila Acheson Wallace-Reader's Digest Foundation Arts Partners Program, to compose a "jazz-Indian score" for choreographer Garth Fagan. Over the next two years, Pullen engaged in a series of two-week residencies with the Chief Cliff Singers of the Kootenai and Bitterroot Salish people of Montana, during which the participants absorbed each other's musical traditions, finding commonalities between Native American music and jazz, blues, and gospel.

Pullen eventually devised a project which involved bringing together the Chief Cliff Singers with the members of his African Brazilian Connection, with whom he had recorded three albums (Kele Mou Bana (1990 [1991]), Ode to Life (1993), and Live...Again: Live at Montreux (1993)). This presented certain challenges, in that the two groups had to adapt to the complexities of each other's musical styles. In addition, Pullen was diagnosed with lymphoma after the project was underway.

== Recording and release ==
The album, produced by Michael Cuscuna, was recorded on March 8 and 9, 1995, at the Power Station in New York City, and was released later that year by Blue Note Records. Led by Pullen on piano, the group features the final incarnation of his African Brazilian Connection, with saxophonist Carlos Ward, trombonist Joseph Bowie, double bassist Santi Debriano, drummer J. T. Lewis, and percussionist Mor Thiam, along with the seven members of the Chief Cliff Singers, who provide vocals and drumming. The music was co-written by Pullen and Mike Kenmille of the Chief Cliff Singers.

At the time of the recording session, Pullen was in remission from the lymphoma that would end his life. However, he was unable to play at the work's live premiere, handing off responsibility for the piano part to his former student D. D. Jackson, with whom he reviewed the music from his hospital bed. Pullen died six weeks after the recording was made, and one day after the premiere in Helena, Montana, in which his music accompanied Fagan's dance work, titled "Earth Eagle First Circle".

== Reception ==
Professional ratings
Review scores
Source	Rating
AllMusic	2/5 stars
Entertainment Weekly	A−
Los Angeles Times	3.5/4 stars
MusicHound Jazz	2.5/5 stars
Orlando Sentinel	5/5 stars
The Penguin Guide to Jazz	3/4 stars

In a review for the Chicago Tribune, Howard Reich described the album as one of Pullen's "most profound" releases, as well as "a thoroughly original recording." He wrote: "Like much of Pullen's legacy, this music fuses ancient and modern, familiar and exotic idioms in mesmerizing ways."

Scott Yanow of AllMusic noted that the music is "definitely not for jazz purists," and stated: "Pullen and his group have a few interludes where they get to stretch out, and there are occasional instances where the two groups actually play off of each other. But because the singers really do not improvise, this well-intentioned project is a mixed success."

Writing for The New York Times, Peter Watrous described the recording as "often beautiful," commenting: "It's exquisite, emotional music, and a testament to Pullen's power."

Entertainment Weekly's Chip Deffaa called the album "a unique, often moving, and surprisingly cohesive recording" with "music that can dance with life or invite spiritual awareness."

Critic Gary Giddins remarked: "At no time... do the two factions really blend. Nor does the record convince me that they are equals. Nevertheless, something remarkable happens. Pullen absorbs their strength and is provoked to the most delicate level of lyricism he ever achieved."

The authors of The Penguin Guide to Jazz Recordings called the album "a strange piece of work," and wrote: "One might wish for a better send-off for Pullen... His desire to find ever broader bases for the Afro-American music that is jazz was immensely laudable, but in casting about for new roots he dissipates much of the energy that made him such a dinstinctive presence on the scene."

A reviewer for the Orlando Sentinel stated: "It's a shame Pullen wasn't allowed a few more years to keep exploring the common ground he discovered here. But it also seems fitting that the last work of such an adventurous artist should be full of so many possibilities."

Don Heckman of Los Angeles Times described the recording as "an extraordinary piece of work," and noted that Pullen "found a connection that has less to do with specific musical techniques than it does with a kind of joint emotional and spiritual constancy." He commented: "His conjunctions, both compositionally and improvisationally, find intersections between the rhythmic flow and spontaneity of jazz and the penetrating chants and insistent percussion of Native America."

Writer Dan Lander remarked: "it is obvious that the two groups were able to find a middle ground, creating a music that is utterly unique. In my estimation it is the adjustments, the give and take that the two cultural groups made that provides the context in which the music is revealed. The so-called compromise is the improvisational imperative and the resultant beauty of the music is a testimony to the worthiness of the participants to invent a process in which to create music together."

== Track listing ==
1. "The Eagle Staff Is First" (Francis Auld, Don Pullen) – 3:54
2. "Common Ground" (Mike Kenmille, Don Pullen) – 10:27
3. "River Song" (Mike Kenmille, Don Pullen) – 7:37
4. "Reservation Blues" (Mike Kenmille, Don Pullen) – 6:46
5. "Message in Smoke" (Mike Kenmille, Don Pullen) – 8:24
6. "Resting on the Run" (Mike Kenmille, Don Pullen) – 7:48
7. "Reprise: Still Here" (Mike Kenmille, Don Pullen) – 1:38

== Personnel ==
- Don Pullen – piano

The African Brazilian Connection

- Carlos Ward – alto saxophone
- Joseph Bowie – trombone
- Santi Debriano – double bass
- J. T. Lewis – drums
- Mor Thiam – African percussion

Chief Cliff Singers (vocals, drums)

- Mike Kenmille
- Clifford Burke
- Arleen Adams
- Gina Big Beaver
- Clayton Burke
- Kenny Lozeau
- Francis Auld
