= ...And They Were Cool =

Studio album by Giuseppi Logan
- Released: 2013
- Recorded: June 26, 2012
- Studio: Dubway Studios, New York City
- Genre: Free jazz
- Label: Improvising Beings ib16
- Producer: Ed Pettersen, Julien Palomo

Giuseppi Logan chronology
The Giuseppi Logan Project (2012)	...And They Were Cool (2013)

...And They Were Cool is an album by saxophonist Giuseppi Logan. His final release, it was recorded on June 26, 2012, at Dubway Studios in New York City, and was issued in 2013 by Improvising Beings. On the album, Logan is joined by saxophonist and flutist Jessica Lurie, guitarist Ed Pettersen, and double bassist Larry Roland. In 2018, the recording was reissued by Pettersen on CD and as a digital download.

The album, which was funded via Kickstarter, marks Logan's third recorded appearance following decades of homelessness, drug dependency, and mental illness, and was released three years after The Giuseppi Logan Quintet and one year after The Giuseppi Logan Project.

== Reception ==
In a review for JazzWord, Ken Waxman stated that the album "contains all the qualities needed to successfully embed a re-discovered player in the present," partly thanks to "properly sympathetic sidemen." He praised the track titled "And Which to Avoid," noting that it "confirms that Logan had regained his aptitude."

Bruce Lee Gallanter of Downtown Music Gallery commented: "Although Mr. Logan has had his many problems, he does sound more focused here playing with three other sympathetic musicians... Mr. Logan sounds relaxed and in great company throughout this entire disc."

== Track listing ==
Composed by Giuseppi Logan.

1. "Taking a Walk in the Park" – 11:07
2. "With My Dog Sam" – 8:50
3. "Singing the Blues" – 5:36
4. "Trying to Decide" – 12:40
5. "Which Path to Choose" – 10:49
6. "And Which to Avoid" – 4:20

== Personnel ==
- Giuseppi Logan – saxophone, piano
- Jessica Lurie – saxophone, flute
- Ed Pettersen – guitar, effects
- Larry Roland – double bass
