= Shakill's II =

Studio album by David Murray
- Released: 1994
- Recorded: October 5 & 6, 1993; Sound On Sound, NYC
- Genre: Jazz
- Length: 61:52
- Label: DIW; DIW 884
- Producer: Kazunori Sugiyama

David Murray chronology
Love and Sorrow (1993)	Shakill's II (1994)	David Murray Quintet (1994)

Shakill's II is an album by David Murray, released on the Japanese DIW label in 1994. It features performances by Murray's Quartet with Don Pullen on electronic organ.

The album is sequel to Murray's 1991 disc, Shakill's Warrior.

== Critical reception ==
Professional ratings
Review scores
Source	Rating
AllMusic	3/5 stars

The Pittsburgh Post-Gazette deemed Shakill's II the 10th best jazz album of 1994.

== Track listing ==
1. "The Sixth Sense" (Frank Dean, Pullen) - 11:24
2. "Blues Somewhere" (Morris) - 8:49
3. "For Cynthia" (Will Connell Jr.) - 8:25
4. "Shakill's II ...My Son Mingus in the Poconos" (Murray) - 11:11
5. "Crazy Tales" (Bill White) - 6:52
6. "One for the Don" (Pullen) - 8:15
7. "1529 Gunn Street" (Pullen) - 6:52

Recorded October 5 & 6, 1993

== Personnel ==
- David Murray - tenor saxophone
- Don Pullen - organ
- Bill White - guitar
- J.T. Lewis - drums
