= Live Ankara =

Live album by Don Cherry
- Released: 1978
- Recorded: November 23, 1969
- Venues: US Embassy, Ankara, Turkey
- Genres: Jazz, World music
- Labels: Sonet Records; SNTF 669
- Producer: Keith Knox

Live Ankara (also known as Live in Ankara) is a live album by trumpeter Don Cherry. It was recorded in November 1969 at the US Embassy in Ankara, Turkey, and was released on LP in 1978 by Sonet Records. On the album, Cherry is joined by three Turkish musicians: saxophonist and percussion Irfan Sümer, bassist Selçuk Sun, and drummer Okay Temiz. The album was reissued by Sonet on CD in 1996, paired with Eternal Now, with the title The Sonet Recordings.

The bulk of the recording consists of a blend of Cherry originals and Turkish folk material arranged by Turkish jazz trumpeter Maffy Falay. Two Ornette Coleman pieces are also included, along with a version of Pharoah Sanders' "The Creator Has a Master Plan."

Falay, who had moved to Stockholm in 1965, was introduced to Cherry by saxophonist Bernt Rosengren, and sparked the trumpeter's interest in traditional Turkish music. In 1968, Temiz arrived in Sweden as part of a dance band, and he and Cherry began playing together. Temiz recalled: "Before I went to Sweden, I never played Turkish music. Never. But, after I learned from Don Cherry, I turned to the mother: Turkish music." The following year, Temiz and Cherry travelled to Turkey, where they recorded Live Ankara with Sümer and Sun, using some of Falay's arrangements.

== Reception ==
Professional ratings
Review scores
Source	Rating
AllMusic	3/5 stars
The Virgin Encyclopedia of Jazz	3/5 stars

In a review for AllMusic, Steve Huey wrote: "The ensemble has a pretty sparse sound, with Cherry the sole lead voice... for much of the concert. All of this serves to emphasize the melodicism of Cherry's playing here, and the Turkish material sits pretty comfortably alongside the jazz compositions. It's not quite essential, but it is very intriguing, and Cherry's more devoted fans will find it more than worth their time."

Writer Daniel Spicer stated: "Cherry's stark, vulnerable cornet and Sümer's throaty tenor sax pick out ancient melodies while Temiz and Sun flit from free-jazz free-fall to traditional rhythms and back again. Nothing quite like it had ever been attempted before."

The authors of the Penguin Guide to Jazz Recordings noted that, in comparison with Eternal Now, Live Ankara is "closer to the work with Ornette: tight, compressed lines on the cheap little Pakistani pocket trumpet Cherry favoured, and two Ornette themes just to cement the connection."

== Track listing ==
1. "Gandalf's Travels" (Don Cherry) – 5:10
2. "Ornette's Concept" (Ornette Coleman) – 2:20
3. "Ornette's Tune" (Ornette Coleman) – 2:35
4. "St. John & the Dragon" (Don Cherry) – 2:02
5. "Efeler" (Turkish folk material) – 2:31
6. "Anadolu Havasi" (Turkish folk material) – 3:02
7. "The Discovery of Bhupala" (Don Cherry) – 3:25
8. "Water Boy" (Don Cherry) – 1:32
9. "Yaz Geldi" (Turkish folk material) – 3:00
10. "Tamzara" (Turkish folk material) – 1:03
11. "Kara Deniz" (Turkish folk material) – 1:12
12. "Köcekce" (Turkish folk material) – 1:11
13. "Man on the Moon" (Don Cherry) – 2:56
14. "The Creator Has a Master Plan" (Pharoah Sanders, Leon Thomas) – 5:13
15. " Two Flutes" (Don Cherry) – 2:50

Tracks 5, 6, 9–12 arranged by Maffy Falay.

== Personnel ==
- Don Cherry – trumpet, piano, vocals, flute
- Irfan Sümer – percussion, tenor saxophone
- Selçuk Sun – bass
- Okay Temiz – drums, percussion
