= Live...Again: Live at Montreux =

Live album by Don Pullen
- Released: 1993
- Recorded: July 13, 1993
- Genre: Jazz
- Length: 73:09
- Label: Blue Note
- Producer: Michael Cuscuna

Don Pullen chronology
Ode to Life (1993)	Live...Again: Live at Montreux (1993)	Sacred Common Ground (1995)

Live...Again: Live at Montreux is a live album by American jazz pianist Don Pullen and the African-Brazilian Connection, recorded in 1993 at the Montreux Jazz Festival for Blue Note Records.

== Reception ==
The Allmusic review awarded the album 4 stars.

Professional ratings
Review scores
Source	Rating
Allmusic	4/5 stars

== Track listing ==
1. "Yebino Spring" (Yebga Likoba) – 16:35
2. "Ah, George, We Hardly Knew Ya" (Don Pullen) – 18:21
3. "Capoeira" (Guilherme Franco) – 13:17
4. "Kele Mou Bana" (Mor Thiam) – 14:23
5. "Aseeko! (Get up and Dance!)" (Thiam) – 10:33

- Recorded at the Montrex Jazz Festival in Montreux, Switzerland on July 13, 1993

== Personnel ==
- Don Pullen – piano
- Carlos Ward – alto saxophone
- Nilson Matta – bass
- J.T. Lewis – drums
- Mor Thiam – djembe, tabula, rainsticks, wind chimes, vocals
