= Random Thoughts =

Random Thoughts may refer to:

== Music ==
- Random Thoughts (Don Pullen album), 1990
- Random Thoughts (Faye Wong album), 1994
- Random Thoughts (Koolism album), 2004
- "Random Thoughts", a song by Steve Kuhn from Non-Fiction

== Other uses ==
- "Random Thoughts" (Star Trek: Voyager), an episode of Star Trek: Voyager
- "Random Thoughts", a column by Richard Felder in the quarterly journal Chemical Engineering Education
- Random Thoughts, 5 volumes by the Chinese writer Ba Jin, 1978–1986

== See also ==
- Racing thoughts, rapid thought patterns that often occur in manic, hypomanic, or mixed episodes
