= Live in Vienna =

Live in Vienna may refer to:

- Live in Vienna (Böhse Onkelz album)
- Live in Vienna (Cluster album)
- Live in Vienna (Cecil Taylor album)
- Live in Vienna (King Crimson album)
