= Long Goodbye: A Tribute to Don Pullen =

Studio album by David Murray
- Released: 1998
- Recorded: 30 September – 1 October 1996
- Genre: Jazz
- Length: 55:36
- Label: DIW
- Producer: Kazunori Sugiyama

David Murray chronology
Dark Star: The Music of the Grateful Dead (1996)	Long Goodbye: A Tribute to Don Pullen (1998)	Fo Deuk Revue (1997)

Professional ratings
Review scores
Source	Rating
AllMusic	3/5 stars

Long Goodbye: A Tribute to Don Pullen is an album by David Murray, released on the Japanese DIW label. Recorded in 1996 and released in 1998, the album contains performances by Murray, pianist D.D. Jackson, bassist Santi Debriano, and drummer J. T. Lewis, in tribute to Don Pullen. The liner notes were penned by Jackson.

== Critical reception ==
The Village Voice wrote that "despite some rousing passages, this is becalming and elegiac, a fitting companion to Pullen’s own Ode to Life."

== Track listing ==
All compositions by Don Pullen except where noted.

1. "Gratitude" – 7:52
2. "Resting on the Road" – 10:29
3. "Out of a Storm" (Jackson) – 8:38
4. "El Matador" – 4:32
5. "Easy Alice" (Jackson) – 8:10
6. "Long Goodbye" (Morris) – 8:00
7. "Common Ground" – 7:54

== Personnel ==
- David Murray – tenor saxophone, bass clarinet
- D. D. Jackson – piano
- Santi Debriano – bass
- J. T. Lewis – drums
