= Don Pullen =

American jazz pianist and organist (1941–1995)

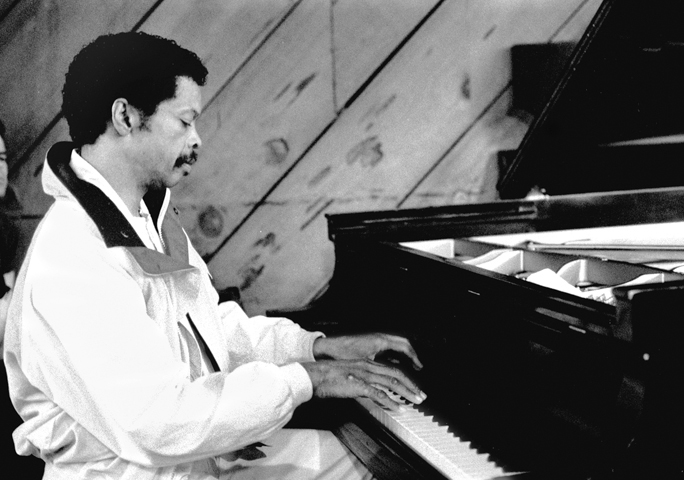
- Pullen in Half Moon Bay, California, June 13, 1988

Background information
- Born: Don Gabriel Pullen; December 25, 1941; Roanoke, Virginia, United States
- Died: April 22, 1995 (aged 53) East Orange, New Jersey, United States
- Genres: Jazz, avant-garde jazz
- Occupations: Musician, composer, arranger, record producer, bandleader
- Instruments: Piano, organ
- Years active: 1964–1995
- Labels: Timeless, Blue Note, Sackville, Black Saint, Atlantic, Palcoscenico, Mosaic, SRP

Don Gabriel Pullen (December 25, 1941 – April 22, 1995) was an American jazz pianist and organist. Pullen developed a strikingly individual style throughout his career. He composed pieces ranging from blues to bebop and modern jazz. The great variety of his body of work makes it difficult to pigeonhole his musical style.

== Biography ==
=== Early life ===
Pullen was born and raised in Roanoke, Virginia, United States. Growing up in a musical family, he learned the piano at an early age. A graduate of Lucy Addison High School, Pullen played in the school's band. He played with the choir in his local church and was heavily influenced by his cousin, Clyde "Fats" Wright, who was a professional jazz pianist. He took some lessons in classical piano and knew little of jazz. At this time, he was mainly aware of church music and the blues.

Pullen left Roanoke for Johnson C. Smith University in North Carolina to study for a medical career, but soon he realized that his true vocation was music. After playing with local musicians and being exposed for the first time to albums of the major jazz musicians and composers, he abandoned his medical studies. He set out to make a career in music, desirous of playing like Ornette Coleman and Eric Dolphy.

=== Early musical career (1964 to 1972) ===
In 1964, he went to Chicago, Illinois, for a few weeks, where he encountered Muhal Richard Abrams' philosophy of making music. He then headed for New York, where he was soon introduced to avant-garde saxophonist Giuseppi Logan, who invited Pullen to play piano on his two albums, Giuseppi Logan (ESP, October 1964) and More (ESP, May 1965), both exercises in structured free playing.

Subsequently, Pullen and Milford Graves formed a duo. Their concert at Yale University in May 1966 was recorded. They formed their own independent SRP record label (standing for "Self Reliance Project") to publish the result as two LPs. These were the first records to bear Pullen's name, second to Graves'. Although not greatly known in the United States, these avant-garde albums were well received in Europe, most copies being sold there. In 2020, Corbett vs. Dempsey released the contents of both albums on a CD titled The Complete Yale Concert, 1966.

Finding little money in playing avant-garde jazz, Pullen began to play the Hammond organ to extend his opportunities for work, transferring elements of his individual piano style to this instrument. During the remainder of the 1960s and early 1970s, he played with his own organ trio in clubs and bars, worked as a self-taught arranger for record companies, and accompanied various singers including Arthur Prysock, Irene Reid, Ruth Brown, Jimmy Rushing and Nina Simone.

In 1972, Pullen briefly appeared with Art Blakey's Jazz Messengers.

Pullen often polarized critics and suffered from two undeserved allegations: the first (despite his grounding in the church and blues) that he was purely a free jazz player and thus unemployable in any other context; the second that he had been heavily influenced by Cecil Taylor or was a clone of Taylor, to whose playing Pullen's own bore a superficial resemblance. Pullen strenuously denied that he had any link with Taylor, stating that his own style had been developed in isolation before he ever heard of Taylor. But the assertion of Taylor's influence continued to haunt Pullen to the end of Pullen's life, and persists even to this day.

Pullen appeared on no more commercial recordings until 1971 and 1972, when he played organ on three recordings by altoist Charles Williams, one being issued under the title of a Pullen composition, "Trees And Grass And Things".

=== Mingus connection (1973 to 1975) ===
In 1973 drummer Roy Brooks introduced Pullen to bassist Charles Mingus, and after a brief audition he took over the vacant piano chair in the Mingus group; when a tenor saxophone player was needed, Pullen recommended George Adams; subsequently, Dannie Richmond returned on drums; these men, together with Jack Walrath on trumpet, formed the last great Mingus group.

Being part of the Mingus group and appearing at many concerts and on three Mingus studio recordings, Mingus Moves (1973), Changes One and Changes Two (both 1974), gave great exposure to Pullen's playing and helped to persuade audiences and critics that Pullen was not just a free jazz player. Two of his own compositions, "Newcomer" and "Big Alice", were recorded on the Mingus Moves session, but "Big Alice" was not released until a CD reissue many years later. However, musical disagreements with Mingus caused Pullen to leave the group in 1975.

=== Emergence as a leader (1975 to 1979) ===
Pullen had always played piano with bass and drums behind him, feeling more comfortable this way, but in early 1975 he was persuaded to play a solo concert in Toronto. This was recorded as Solo Piano Album (Sackville) and became the first record issued under Pullen's name alone. Among other pieces, it contains "Sweet (Suite) Malcolm", declared a masterpiece by Cameron Brown, Pullen's long time associate of later years.

There was now growing awareness of Pullen's abilities, but it was the European recording companies that were prepared to preserve them. In 1975 an Italian record company gave Pullen, George Adams, and Dannie Richmond the opportunity to each make a recording under his own name. All three collaborated in the others' recordings. In the same year, Pullen made two further solo recordings in Italy, Five To Go (Horo) and Healing Force (Black Saint), the latter being received with great acclaim. He became part of the regular seasonal tours of American musicians to Europe, playing in the avant-garde or free mode.

In 1977, Pullen was signed by a major American record company, Atlantic Records. This led to two records, the atypical Tomorrow's Promises and the live Montreux Concert. But after these, Pullen's association with Atlantic was terminated and he returned to European companies for three recordings under his own name or in partnership: Warriors and Milano Strut in 1978, and The Magic Triangle in 1979. These, especially the startling Warriors with its strong 30-minute title track, have remained in the catalogues over the years.

Meanwhile, he recorded with groups led by Billy Hart (drums), Hamiet Bluiett (baritone sax), Cecil McBee (bass), Sunny Murray (drums) and Marcello Melis (bass). On the formation of the first Mingus Dynasty band Pullen occupied the piano chair and appeared on their recording Chair In The Sky in 1979, but he soon left the band, feeling the music had diverged too far from Mingus' intentions.

=== George Adams/Don Pullen Quartet (1979 to 1988) ===
In late 1979 Pullen, Adams, and Richmond were booked to play as a quartet for a European tour of a few weeks' duration. Pullen invited Cameron Brown to join them on bass. They were asked to bill themselves as a "Mingus group", but not wanting to be identified as mere copyists, they declined and performed as the George Adams/Don Pullen Quartet. They played music that was more structured than Pullen normally favored, but the immediate rapport among them led to the group touring the world with unchanged personnel until the death of Richmond in early 1988. From very early in their first tour in 1979, and until 1985, the quartet made a dozen recordings for European labels, both in the studio and in concert. Of these, Earth Beams (1980), Live At The Village Vanguard (1983) and Decisions (1984) provide typically fine examples of their work at that period.

Although highly regarded in Europe, the quartet felt they were not well enough known in America, so in 1986 they signed to record for Blue Note Records, for which they recorded Breakthrough (1986) and Song Everlasting (1987). Beginning the Blue Note contract with great hope of increased fame and success, as shown by the title of the first album, they became disillusioned by the poor availability of the two records. Although the power of their live concerts maintained their reputation as one of the most exciting groups ever seen, the music recorded for the Blue Note sessions was at first deemed "smoother" than on their European recordings, and took time to achieve the same high reputation.

After the death of Dannie Richmond the quartet fulfilled their remaining contracted engagements with drummer Lewis Nash and then disbanded in mid-1988. Their music, usually original compositions by Pullen, Adams and Richmond, had ranged from blues, through ballads, to post-bop and avant-garde. The ability of the players to encompass all these areas, often within one composition, removed any sameness or sterility from the quartet format. Except for the early recordings on the vanished Horo label, their European recordings on Soulnote and Timeless remained frequently available, unlike those made for Blue Note.

During the life of the Quartet, Pullen also made a duo recording with George Adams, Melodic Excursions (1982), and made three recordings under his own name, two further solo albums, the acclaimed Evidence Of Things Unseen (1983) and Plays Monk (1984), then with a quintet, another highly praised recording The Sixth Sense (1985) on Black Saint. He also recorded with (alphabetically) Hamiet Bluiett; Roy Brooks, the drummer who introduced him to Mingus; Jane Bunnett; Kip Hanrahan; Beaver Harris; Marcello Melis; and David Murray.

All Pullen's future recordings under his own name were for Blue Note. On 16 December 1988 he went into the studio with Gary Peacock (bass) and Tony Williams (drums) to make his first trio album New Beginnings, which astonished even those familiar with his work and became widely regarded as one of the finest trio albums ever recorded. He followed this in 1990 with another trio album, Random Thoughts, in somewhat lighter mood, this time with James Genus (bass) and Lewis Nash (drums).

=== African Brazilian connection and late career (1990 to 1995) ===
In late 1990 Pullen added a new element to his playing and his music with the formation of his African Brazilian Connection ("ABC"). This featured Carlos Ward (alto sax), Nilson Matta (bass), Guilherme Franco and Mor Thiam (percussion) in a group which mixed African and Latin rhythms with jazz. Their first album, Kele Mou Bana, was released in 1991. Their second, but very different, album of 1993, Ode To Life, was a tribute to George Adams, who had died on November 14, 1992, containing Pullen's heartfelt and moving composition in Adams' memory, "Ah George We Hardly Knew Ya". A third album, Live...Again, recorded in July 1993 at the Montreux Jazz Festival, was not released until 1995. This featured "Ah George..." and other songs from their previous albums, in somewhat extended versions. Pullen achieved more popular and commercial success with this group than with any other. In 1993 Ode To Life was fifth on the U.S. Billboard Top Jazz Album chart.

During the last few years of his life, Pullen toured with his trio, with his African Brazilian Connection, and as a solo artist, but did not release any more solo records. As a sideman and session musician, he left his mark with a variety of noteworthy artists, including (alphabetically) Jane Bunnett (notably their duo album New York Duets), Bill Cosby, Kip Hanrahan, David Murray's 1991 Shakill's Warrior, Maceo Parker, Ivo Perelman and Jack Walrath. He also toured and recorded with the group Roots from its inception.

Pullen's final project was a work combining the sounds of his African Brazilian Connection (extended by Joseph Bowie on trombone) with a choir and drums of Native Americans. Despite his Native American background (his paternal grandmother was half-Native American, probably Cherokee), he began to experiment with American Indian music as late as July 1992. In 1994 Pullen was diagnosed with lymphoma. He continued to put great physical effort into completing the composition. In early March 1995 he played on his final recording, Sacred Common Ground (with the Chief Cliff Singers, Kootenai Indians from Elmo, Montana), a few weeks away from his death, returning to his heritage of the blues and the church. Unable to play at the live premiere, his place at the piano was taken by D.D. Jackson, with whom Pullen discussed the music from his hospital bed shortly before his death. He died on April 22, 1995, of lymphoma.

Pullen composed many pieces, which often were portraits or memories of people he knew. All were published by his own company, Andredon, but because he for a long time suffered from neglect musically, so did many of his compositions. His best known are the humorous "Big Alice" (for an imaginary fan), "Double Arc Jake" (for his son Jake and Rahsaan Roland Kirk), the passionate "Ode To Life" (for a friend), and the aforementioned lament, "Ah George We Hardly Knew Ya". Occasionally he wrote pieces with a religious feeling, such as "Gratitude" and "Healing Force", or to highlight the plight of African-Americans, such as "Warriors", "Silence = Death", and "Endangered Species: African American Youth". Following the assassination of African-American activist Malcolm X, Pullen had written a suite dedicated to Malcolm X's memory, but this required more instrumental resources than a normal-sized jazz group provides, and only the piano parts of this were ever recorded. Except for the Plays Monk album, Pullen almost exclusively featured his own compositions on his own recordings, until his time with the African Brazilian Connection. His compositions are well represented on the George Adams/Don Pullen Quartet recordings, but his compositions which were recorded by others were usually performed by those who had known and worked with him.

Pullen's piano technique can be seen on the DVDs Mingus At Montreux 1975 and Roots Salutes The Saxophones.

== Posthumous tributes ==
Several musicians wrote songs as personal tributes to Pullen's memory. David Murray and D. D. Jackson recorded an album, Long Goodbye: A Tribute to Don Pullen (1998), dedicated to Pullen and featuring his compositions. Others who wrote tributes include Jane Bunnett, Cameron Brown and Myra Melford. D.D. Jackson also dedicated a piece to him on his CD, Paired Down, Vol. I (Justin Time Records, 1996), entitled "For Don".

In 2005, Mosaic Records issued a set of four long-unavailable Blue Note recordings: Breakthrough and Song Everlasting by the Don Pullen/George Adams Quartet, and New Beginning and Random Thoughts by Pullen's own trio. Also, his songs hit big screen movies, such as "Big Alice" in The Preacher's Wife and "Once Upon A Time" in Once Upon A Time When We Were Colored.

== Discography ==
=== As leader ===
Year recorded	Title	Label	Personnel/Notes
1966	In Concert at Yale University	SRP	Duo, with Milford Graves (percussion); in concert
1966	Nommo	SRP	Duo, with Milford Graves (drums, percussion); in concert
1975	Solo Piano Album	Sackville	Solo piano. Later reissued under the title "Richards's Tune"
1975	Jazz a Confronto 21	Horo	Quartet, with George Adams (tenor sax, flute, percussion), David Williams (bass, percussion), Dannie Richmond (drums, vocals)
1975	Five to Go	Horo	Solo piano
1975	Capricorn Rising	Black Saint	Quartet, with Sam Rivers (tenor sax, soprano sax, flute), Alex Blake (bass), Bobby Battle (drums)
1976	Healing Force	Black Saint	Solo piano
1976–77	Tomorrow's Promises	Atlantic	With George Adams (tenor sax, soprano sax, bass clarinet, flute; all tracks), for some tracks, others were added: Randy Brecker and Hannibal Marvin Peterson (trumpet), Roland Prince and Sterling Magee (guitar), Michal Urbaniak (violin), İlhan Mimaroğlu (electronics), John Flippin (electric bass), Alex Blake (bass), Tyronne Walker (drums), Bobby Battle (drums, percussion), Ray Mantilla (percussion), Rita DaCosta (vocals)
1977	Montreux Concert	Atlantic	One track trio, with Jeff Berlin (electric bass), Steve Jordan (drums); one track quintet, with Raphael Cruz and Sammy Figueroa (percussion) added; in concert
1978	Warriors	Black Saint	Quartet, with Chico Freeman (tenor sax), Fred Hopkins (bass), Bobby Battle (drums)
1978	Milano Strut	Black Saint	Duo, with Don Moye (drums, percussion)
1979	The Magic Triangle	Black Saint	Trio, with Joseph Jarman (tenor sax, alto sax, clarinet, flute, alto flute, piccolo), Don Moye (drums, percussion)
1984	Plays Monk	Paddle Wheel	Solo piano
1983	Evidence of Things Unseen	Black Saint	Solo piano
1985	The Sixth Sense	Black Saint	Quintet, with Olu Dara (trumpet), Donald Harrison (alto sax), Fred Hopkins (bass), Bobby Battle (drums)
1988	New Beginnings	Blue Note	Trio, with Gary Peacock (bass), Tony Williams (drums)
1990	Random Thoughts	Blue Note	Trio, with James Genus (bass), Lewis Nash (drums)
1990	Kele Mou Bana	Blue Note	With the African-Brazilian Connection: Carlos Ward (alto sax), Nilson Matta (bass), Guilherme Franco (percussion), Mor Thiam (percussion, vocals), Keith Pullen and Tameka Pullen (vocals)
1993	Ode to Life	Blue Note	With the African-Brazilian Connection: Carlos Ward (alto sax, flute), Nilson Matta (bass), Guilherme Franco (percussion), Mor Thiam (percussion, vocals)
1993	Live...Again: Live at Montreux	Blue Note	With the African-Brazilian Connection: Carlos Ward (alto sax), Nilson Matta (bass), J.T. Lewis (drums), Mor Thiam (percussion, vocals); in concert
1995	Sacred Common Ground	Blue Note	With Carlos Ward (alto sax), Joseph Bowie (trombone), Santi Debriano (bass), J.T. Lewis (drums), Mor Thiam (percussion); Chief Cliff Singers (vocals, drums)

=== As the George Adams/Don Pullen Quartet ===
- All That Funk (Palcoscenico, 1979)
- More Funk (Palcoscenico, 1979)
- Don't Lose Control (Soul Note, 1979)
- Paradise Space Shuttle (Timeless, 1989) (Recorded in 1979)
- Earth Beams (Timeless, 1980)
- Life Line (Timeless, 1981)
- Melodic Excursions (Timeless, 1982)
- City Gates (Timeless, 1983)
- Live at the Village Vanguard (Soul Note, 1983)
- Live at the Village Vanguard Vol. 2 (Soul Note, 1983)
- Decisions (Timeless, 1990) (Recorded in 1984)
- Live at Montmartre (Timeless, 1985)
- Breakthrough (Blue Note, 1986)
- Song Everlasting (Blue Note, 1987)

=== As sideman ===
With George Adams

- Jazz a Confronto 22 (1975)
- Suite for Swingers (1975)

With the Art Ensemble of Chicago

- Fundamental Destiny, recorded 1991 (AECO, 2007)

With Hamiet Bluiett

- Resolution (Black Saint, 1977)
- Orchestra, Duo and Septet (1977)
- We Have Come to Save You FrOm YourselveS (Im/possible to Keep) (1979)
- Live at Carlos I (1986)
- Live at Carlos I: Another Night (1986)

With Roy Brooks

- Duet in Detroit (Enja, 1987 [1993])

With Jane Bunnett

- In Dew Time (1989)
- New York Duets (1989)
- Live at Sweet Basil (1992)
- The Water Is Wide (1993)

With Beaver Harris

- A Well-Kept Secret (1980)
- Negcaumongus (1980)

With Billy Hart

- Enchance (Horizon, 1977)

With Giuseppi Logan

- The Giuseppi Logan Quartet (ESP, 1965)
- More (ESP, 1965)

With Cecil McBee

- Alternate Spaces (India Navigation, 1979)

With Marcello Melis

- Perdas De Fogu (RCA, 1974)
- Free to Dance (Black Saint, 1978)
- Angedras (Black Saint, 1982)

With Charles Mingus

- Jazz in Detroit (BBE, 1973)
- Mingus Moves (Atlantic, 1973)
- Mingus at Carnegie Hall (Atlantic, 1974)
- Changes One (Atlantic, 1974)
- Changes Two (Atlantic, 1974)

With Charles Mingus' Dynasty

- Chair in the Sky (1979)

With David Murray

- Flowers for Albert (1976)
- Penthouse Jazz (Volume 1) (1977)
- Holy Siege on Intrigue (Volume 2) (1977)
- Children (Black Saint, 1985)
- Shakill's Warrior (DIW, 1991)
- Shakill's II (DIW, 1993)

With Sunny Murray

- Apples Cores (1977)

With Maceo Parker

- Roots Revisited (Minor Music, 1990)

With Ivo Perelman

- Children of Ibeji (1992)

With Dannie Richmond

- Jazz a Confronto 25 (1975)

With Sam Rivers

- Black Africa (1977)

With Roots

- Salutes the Saxophone (1991)
- Stablemates (1992)

With John Scofield

- Live 3 Ways (1990)

With Jack Walrath

- Serious Hang (Muse, 1992)

With Charles Williams

- Charles Williams (Mainstream, 1971)
- Trees and Grass and Things (Mainstream, 1971)
- Stickball (Mainstream, 1972)
