= Giuseppi Logan =

American musician (1935–2020)

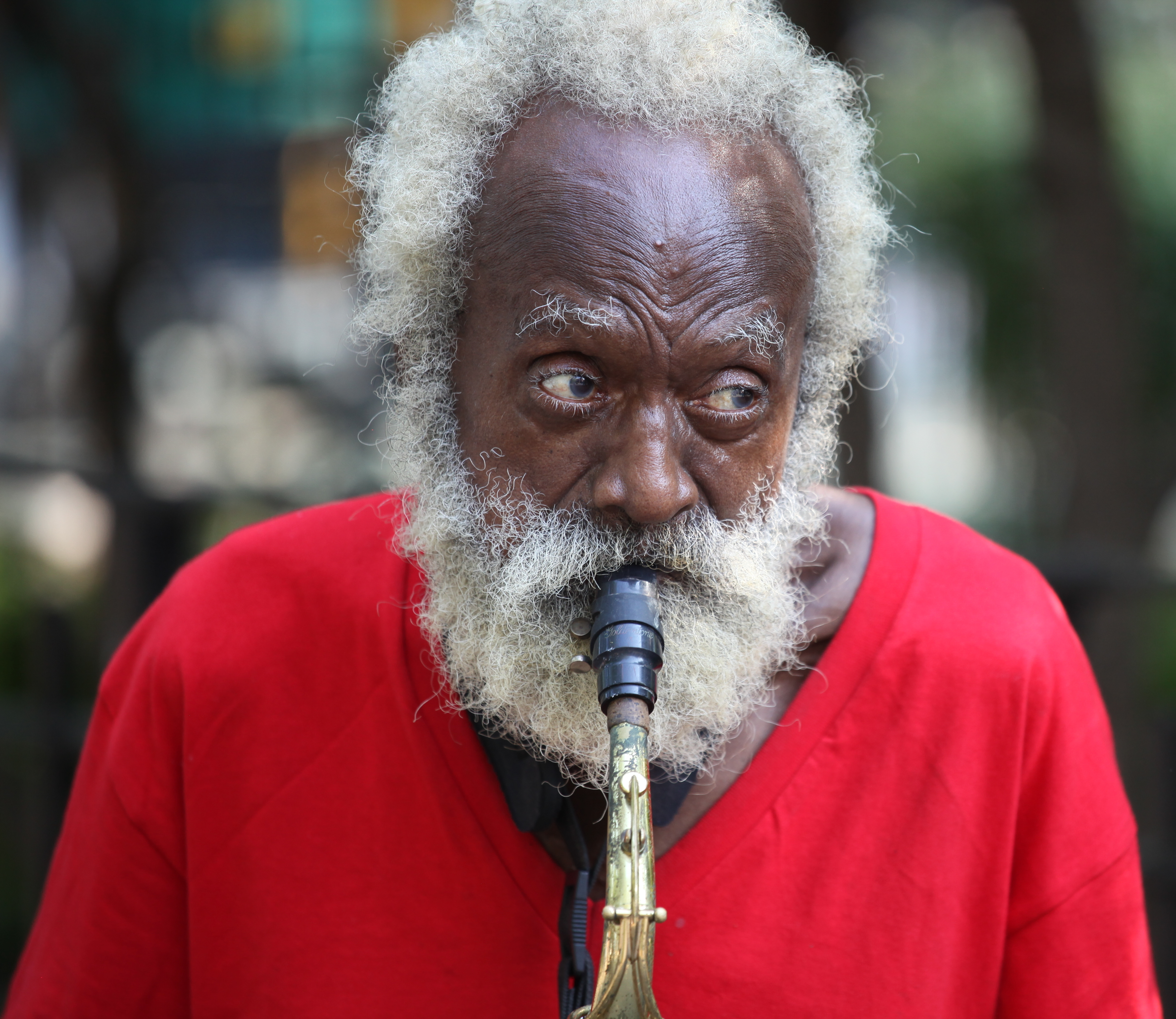
- Giuseppi Logan in 2010

Background information
- Born: May 22, 1935
- Origin: Philadelphia, Pennsylvania
- Died: April 17, 2020 (aged 84) Far Rockaway, Queens, New York
- Genres: Jazz
- Years active: 1940–2020

Giuseppi Logan (May 22, 1935 – April 17, 2020) was a jazz musician, originally from Philadelphia, Pennsylvania, who taught himself to play piano and drums before switching to reeds at the age of 12. At the age of 15 he began playing with Earl Bostic and later studied at the New England Conservatory. In 1964 he relocated to New York and became active in the free jazz scene.

== Biography ==
Logan played alto and tenor saxophone, bass clarinet, flute, piano and oboe. He collaborated with Archie Shepp, Pharoah Sanders and Bill Dixon before forming his own quartet made up of pianist Don Pullen, bassist Eddie Gómez and percussionist Milford Graves. After Pullen's departure, pianist Dave Burrell joined the group. Logan was a member of Byard Lancaster's band and toured with and appeared on records by Patty Waters. He recorded two albums for the ESP-Disk record label and later appeared on an album by Roswell Rudd on the Impulse! label. A 1965 press release from ESP-Disk indicates that a third album was planned, but never released, possibly due to Logan's increasingly erratic behavior. This title was supposed to have been ESP-1018, The Giuseppi Logan Chamber Ensemble in Concert, but this catalogue number was eventually assigned to an album by The Fugs.

Vintage footage of Logan comprises a short film by Edward English. Anecdotes about the man are scarce, but those that exist illustrate his influence over those he worked with. Several of these are below.

Bill Dixon on Logan:

[In the summer of 1964], Giuseppi Logan was 'studying' with me, meaning: he wanted to know certain things, and I needed an alto player, so he played all of my concerts, and occasionally I would let him have some of his things played in the group. He had a great deal of difficulty with getting people to play his music. I think at the time I was the only trumpet player who could play his music, and I loved playing it.

No one sounded in an ensemble like Giuseppi. He held his head back all the way, explaining once, 'This way my throat is completely open,' so he could have more air coming through his windpipe. He used to pride himself on playing up to the fourth octave on alto. The things that made him different as an improvisor were the way he placed his notes, that sound he got, and then what the others in his group played behind him. His pieces were very attractive for those reasons. Giuseppi had his own points of view about music, which is what this music is supposed to be about. We got along.

ESP-Disk's Bernard Stollman on Logan:

Giuseppi was doing an awful lot of drugs—he burned out, well, actually, he flipped out and never came back. I think that helps explain what happened to Giuseppi. Also, he was mentally ill to some degree and he attacked me once, just randomly. He would assault people without any warning; I loved his music, however, and when he did his first session, resulting from the October Revolution [ESP 1007, Giuseppi Logan Quartet], Milford Graves and he filed through the studio and as they walked in to record, Giuseppi turned to me and said "if you rob me, I'll kill you." Milford was mortified—he had asked me to record Giuseppi—I'd given him a record date and he threatened me with death.

At one point, I was standing with the engineer in the control room, and I thought the piece they were playing was stunningly beautiful. It sounded totally spontaneous, as if they were ad-libbing and commenting like a gorgeous conversation. Suddenly, I heard a 'thwuuunk', and I realized that the tape had run out. The engineer and I were so absorbed, we hadn't been paying attention. I thought "oh God, this remarkable thing is lost. It was interrupted in the middle, and it's gone." Richard Alderson was the engineer, and he got on the intercom and said "Giuseppi, the tape ran out." Without a pause, Giuseppi said "take it back to before where it stopped and we'll take it from there." So he did, he wound it back and played some bars of it and took down the record button, and they resumed exactly what they were doing—there was no way of telling where one or the other ended. It was unreal.

Milford Graves on Logan:

The reports that I've received is that he is still alive. He was spotted up in Harlem, New York. That's what people say. I don't know. I was approached to go up to Harlem to seek him out. Somebody spotted him in a hotel on 125th Street and I haven't had the opportunity to do that. Someone said they saw him, but I don't know. I wouldn't say that he is still alive. That was the latest on him. I last saw Giuseppi Logan in the Seventies and he wasn't in good shape. He was in the streets. He is a question mark whether he is still alive. Hopefully, he is. I was the one who told Bernard Stollman (founder of ESP) about Giuseppi Logan. I met Bernard Stollman through the New York Art Quartet. He wanted to record me and in turn, I told Giuseppi that I have some time because I'm a young guy and instead of me taking this record date and being the leader, I gave him the record date and so he took the record date. It was 1965 when we did that together.

Beset with personal problems, Logan vanished from the music scene in the early 1970s and for over three decades his whereabouts were unknown; however, in 2008 he was filmed by a Christian mission group just after he had returned to New York after years in and out of institutions in the Carolinas. Around this same time filmmaker Suzannah Troy made the first of many short films of Logan practicing in his preferred hangout, Tompkins Square Park. Subsequently, he was the subject of a major piece by Pete Gershon in the spring 2009 edition of Signal to Noise Magazine, which detailed the events surrounding Logan's "comeback" gig at the Bowery Poetry Club in February 2009.

On April 6, 2009, Logan performed, with a group, at Local 269 in NYC as part of the RUCMA performance series. Later that year he appeared in the short documentary film Water in the Boat by David Gutiérrez Camps, where his music improvisations formed the soundtrack of the film.

In 2010, Logan released a comeback record announcing his return to music on Tompkins Square Records with Matt Lavelle, Dave Burrell, Warren Smith and Francois Grillot. In April 2010, this group performed a concert in Philadelphia with Dave Miller playing for Warren Smith at the Ars Nova Workshop

In October 2011, Logan recorded six songs with "a group of younger experimental musicians"; as of April 2012, he was still living in New York and performing as a street musician. At some point around 2011 he was shot and ended up in a home in Far Rockaway, Queens. ref: The Devil's Horn seen on SKY Arys.

Logan died on April 17, 2020, at a nursing facility in Far Rockaway, Queens from COVID-19.

== Discography ==
=== As leader ===
- The Giuseppi Logan Quartet (ESP, 1965)
- More (ESP, 1966)
- The Giuseppi Logan Quintet (Tompkins Square, 2010)
- The Giuseppi Logan Project (Mad King Edmund, 2012)
- ...And They Were Cool (Improvising Beings, 2013)

=== As sideman ===
With Roswell Rudd

- Everywhere (Impulse!, 1966) (also released as part of Mixed in 1998)

With Steve Swell's Nation of We

- The Business of Here: Live at Roulette (Cadence, 2012)

With Patty Waters

- College Tour (ESP-Disk, 1966)
- The Complete ESP-Disk Recordings (ESP-Disk, 2005)
