= Relativity Suite =

Studio album by Don Cherry and the Jazz Composer's Orchestra
- Released: 1973
- Recorded: February 14, 1973
- Studios: Blue Rock Studio, New York
- Length: 33:22
- Label: JCOA
- Producers: Don Cherry, Jazz Composer's Orchestra

Jazz Composer's Orchestra chronology
Escalator Over the Hill (1971)	Relativity Suite (1973)	Numatik Swing Band (1973)

Don Cherry chronology
Organic Music Society (1972)	Relativity Suite (1973)	Eternal Now (1973)

Relativity Suite is a free-jazz LP by Don Cherry and the Jazz Composer's Orchestra released in 1973.

== Background ==
Having appeared on the first two JCOA records by Michael Mantler and Carla Bley, Cherry was commissioned to write the third one in 1970. He used many of the same musicians who contributed to the first two records and molded into a suite a string of the pieces he'd been composing and performing in the previous few years. Studying with Pandit Pran Nath, Cherry was increasingly using Indian karnatic singing in his recordings and concerts and he starts the album with a similarly derived chant."

== Reception ==
Professional ratings
Review scores
Source	Rating
AllMusic	4/5 stars
The Rolling Stone Jazz Record Guide	4/5 stars
Tom Hull – on the Web	B+

Jazz critic Scott Yanow wrote: "Highlights include Selene Fung's lovely work on the guzheng, a Chinese koto-like instrument, and Ed Blackwell's exuberant New Orleans marching patterns on the concluding number. While not as breathtaking or cohesive as his Eternal Rhythm, Relativity Suite almost matches that release in its first half and contains many a worthwhile joy."

In a New York Times review of a live performance preceding the recording session, John S. Wilson described the music as "a mixture of charming, folklike melodies with a distinctly African tinge, of strong, compelling rhythms and, as occasional counter point, excursions into the clamorous, shrieking fury characteristic of avant-garde jazz." He stated: "The work itself and Mr. Cherry's conception of its presentation are so kaleidoscopic that a single hearing is simply an introduction to the materials used. It is music that can, and should, be heard repeatedly, not only for the variations that Mr. Cherry develops from performance to performance, but also for the rich lode of lyrical beauty and rhythmic stimulation with which he has filled it."

Writing for The Free Jazz Collective, Stef Gijssels noted that, with Relativity Suite, "Instrumental perfection and precision were not [Cherry's] primary focus, but rather the creation of a sonic universe that was new, global, inclusive with the ambition to create something universal and spiritual, not imposed out of some cerebral and abstract concept, but grown organically from the already existing sounds of many cultures."

== Track listing ==
1. "Tantra" – 8:00
2. "Mali Doussn'gouni" – 5:40
3. "Desireless" – 1:22
4. "The Queen of Tung-T'ing Lake" – 4:30
5. "Trans-Love Airways" – 6:50
6. "Infinite Gentleness" – 3:22
7. "March of the Hobbits" – 3:38

== Personnel ==
- Don Cherry – composer, conductor, trumpet, conch, voice, percussion
- Charles Brackeen – soprano saxophone, alto saxophone, voice
- Carlos Ward – alto saxophone, voice
- Frank Lowe – tenor saxophone, voice
- Dewey Redman – tenor saxophone, voice
- Sharon Freeman – French horn
- Brian Trentham – trombone
- Jack Jeffers – tuba
- Leroy Jenkins – violin
- Joan Kalisch – viola
- Nan Newton – viola
- Pat Dixon – cello
- Jane Robertson – cello
- Charlie Haden – bass
- Carla Bley – piano
- Ed Blackwell – drums
- Paul Motian – drums, percussion
- Moki Cherry – tambura (Trans-Love Airwars)
- Selene Fung – guzheng

== Production ==
- Producer: Don Cherry and the Jazz Composer's Orchestra
- Publisher: Eternal River Music (BMI)
- Engineer: Eddie Korvin
- Studio: Blue Rock Studio, Greene Street, Manhattan, New York
- Cover: Quilt designed and handmade by Moki Cherry photographed by Gregory Reeve
- Back cover photography: Don and Eagle Eye Cherry by Jonathan Sa’ada
