= What It Be Like? Ed Blackwell Project Vol. 2 =

Live album by Ed Blackwell
- Released: 1994
- Recorded: August 8, 1992
- Venue: Yoshi's, Oakland, California
- Genre: Jazz
- Length: 1:07:41
- Label: Enja Records; ENJ-8054 2
- Producer: Kunle Mwanga

What It Be Like? Ed Blackwell Project Vol. 2 is a live album by drummer Ed Blackwell. It was recorded in August 1992 at Yoshi's in Oakland, California, and was released by Enja Records in 1994. On the album, Blackwell is joined by saxophonist and flutist Carlos Ward, cornetist Graham Haynes, and bassist Mark Helias. Trumpeter Don Cherry also appears on one track. The album, which is the companion to What It Is? Ed Blackwell Project Vol. 1, is one of Blackwell's last recordings; he died in October 1992.

== Reception ==
Professional ratings
Review scores
Source	Rating
AllMusic	3/5 stars
The Penguin Guide to Jazz	3/4 stars
The Rolling Stone Jazz & Blues Album Guide	5/5 stars

In a review for AllMusic, the editors wrote that Blackwell's "distinctive approach to timekeeping, which highlights tribal rhythms and New Orleans marching band cadences, is on excellent display on What It Be Like?... 'Nebula,' the opener, features a tumbling horn melody with Blackwell providing almost martial accents on the snare, and is an excellent example of his style... The compositional palette on What It Be Like? is broad, with tones, textures, and atmospheres shifting throughout the track list. In 'Pentahouve,' exuberance prevails with a fragmented Latin shuffle providing the context for a dazzling rhythmic dialogue between Blackwell and flautist Carlos Ward. On the album's closer and set piece... Don Cherry joins the ensemble for an evocative exploration of fractured melodies and snake-charmer motifs over a repeated rhythmic pattern. After each band member has soloed, Blackwell's strictly metered flourishes over the snare and tom-toms close out the tune, which in turn closes out this fine set of vital, adventurous jazz."

Writing for Modern Drummer magazine, Mark Griffith commented: "Ed Blackwell Projects Volumes 1 and 2 are amazing examples of Ed's chanting and rolling style of drumming. But these last recordings are as much life lessons as drum lessons. At the end of his life Ed was very ill. His kidneys were in complete failure. Simple things like moving around were often a real chore — let alone playing the drums. Still, he traveled across the country to make a gig in San Francisco, where he made these two records. On each track, his drumming snaps and crackles with youth and excitement. There is absolutely no indication that he was less than two months away from the end."

== Track listing ==
1. "Nebula" – 9:59
2. "Grandma's Shoes" (Ward) – 13:05
3. "Pentahouve" (Helias) – 8:32
4. "First Love (For Thelonious Monk)" (Ward) – 7:21
5. "Lito (Parts 1, 2 & 3)" (Ward) – 27:58

== Personnel ==
- Carlos Ward – alto saxophone, flute
- Graham Haynes – cornet
- Don Cherry – trumpet (track 5)
- Mark Helias – bass
- Ed Blackwell – drums
