= Santi Debriano =

American jazz musician

- Born: Santi Wilson Debriano; 27 June 1955 (age 71); Panama City, Panama
- Education: Franklin K. Lane High School, Union College, New England Conservatory of Music, Wesleyan University
- Occupation: Jazz bassist
- Years active: 1981–

Santi Wilson Debriano (born 1955 in Panama) is a jazz bassist, composer and music teacher.

== Early life and education ==
Debriano was raised in Brooklyn, having moved there with his family at age four. His father is known as a song composer in Panama. Debriano started playing jazz instruments as a teenager in Franklin K. Lane High School. From 1972 to 1976 he studied composition and politics at Union College in New York, then attended the New England Conservatory of Music and Wesleyan University.

== Career ==
He worked with Archie Shepp in the late 1970s and early 1980s, then moved to Paris and played with Sam Rivers for three years. He then returned to New York City. He currently lives in Staten Island.

Debriano has led several of his own units, including small groups in the late 1980s and Circlechant, a world music-influenced ensemble which has had among its members Helio Alves, Will Calhoun, and Abraham Burton. As a sideman and bandmember, he has worked with Larry Coryell, Sonny Fortune, Hank Jones, Don Pullen, Pharoah Sanders, Archie Shepp, Cecil Taylor, Chucho Valdes, and Randy Weston.

He leads an ensemble called Flash of the Spirit. Santi's latest release is titled "Ashanti" is on JoJo Records. Santi also performs frequently on guitar, with his organ group that features vocalist Nina Shanka. His several concerts were broadcast by National Public Radio, WBGO and WNYC.

With the Garth Fagan and Don Pullen, he participated in the realization the dance piece Sacred Common Ground in 1995.

Santi participated in the production of two documentary films on jazz with filmmaker Marc Huraux. In 1988 he worked on a documentary film Bird Now and during 1996 on Check the Changes.

Debriano was also the music director for arts at Dwight Morrow High School in Englewood, New Jersey, and was given an award for jazz education by New York University in 2001.

== Discography ==
=== As leader ===
- Obeah (1987, Freelance)
- Soldiers of Fortune (Freelance, 1989)
- Trio Plus Two (Free Lance, 1990) Co Leader with Cindy Blackman and Dave Fiuczysnki
- Panamaniacs (Evidence, 1997)
- Circlechant (HighNote, 1999)
- Artistic License (Savant, 2001)
- 3-Ololy (Bellaphon, 2006)
- Flash of the Spirit (Truth Revolution Records, 2021)
- Ashanti (Jojo Records, 2022)

=== As sideman ===
- Bill Barron: Live at Cobi's (SteepleChase, 1988-89 [2005])
- Baikida Carroll: Door of the Cage (Soul Note, 1994 [1995])
- Larry Coryell: Monk, Trane, Miles & Me (HighNote, 1999)
- Larry Coryell: Inner Urge (HighNote, 2001)
- Stanley Cowell: Back to the Beautiful (Concord, 1989)
- Sonny Fortune: Four in One (Blue Note, 1994), From Now On (Blue Note, 1996)
- Chico Freeman: Focus (Contemporary, 1994)
- Don Friedman: Red Sky Waltz (Alfa Music, 1996)
- Billy Hart: Amethyst (Arabesque, 1993), Oceans of Time (Arabesque, 1997)
- Louis Hayes: Louis at Large (Sharp Nine, 1996)
- Louis Hayes: Quintessential Lou (TCB, 1999)
- Louis Hayes: The Candy Man (TCB, 2001)
- Louis Hayes: The Time Keeper (18th & Vine, 2009)
- Oliver Lake: Compilation (Gramavision, 1982–86)
- Oliver Lake: Virtual Reality (Total Escapism) (Gazell, 1992)
- Kirk Lightsey: Kirk 'n Marcus (Criss Cross Jazz, 1987) with Marcus Belgrave
- Charles McPherson: Come Play with Me (Arabesque, 1995)
- David Murray: Black & Black (DIW, 1991)
- David Murray: Long Goodbye: A Tribute to Don Pullen (DIW, 1996)
- Jim Pepper: Dakota Sound (Enja, 1987)
- Jim Pepper: The Path (Enja, 1988)
- Don Pullen: Sacred Common Ground (Blue Note, 1995)
- Charlie Rouse: Soul Mates (Uptown, 1988 [1993]) featuring Sahib Shihab
- Archie Shepp: Soul Song (Enja, 1982)
- Bob Thiele Collective: Louis Satchmo (1991)
- Larry Willis: Let's Play (SteepleChase, 1991)
- New York Unit: Tribute to George Adams (Paddle Wheel, 1992)
- Bill O'Connell: Touch [ JoJo Records 2024]
