= Lito: Live at the North Sea Jazz Festival =

Live album by Carlos Ward Quartet Featuring Woody Shaw
- Released: 1989
- Recorded: July 9, 1988
- Venue: North Sea Jazz Festival, Rotterdam, Netherlands
- Genre: Jazz
- Length: 58:50
- Label: Leo Records; LR 166
- Producer: Leo Feigin

Carlos Ward chronology
| Lito: Live at the North Sea Jazz Festival (1989) | Faces (1994) |

Alternate album cover

Lito: Live at the North Sea Jazz Festival is a live album by saxophonist Carlos Ward, his debut as a leader. It was recorded on July 9, 1988, at the North Sea Jazz Festival in Rotterdam, Netherlands, and was released on LP in 1989 by Leo Records. On the album, Ward is joined by trumpeter Woody Shaw, bassist Walter Schmocker, and drummer Alex Deutsch. The album was reissued in 1992 with an additional track.

== Reception ==
Professional ratings
Review scores
| Source | Rating |
|---|---|
| AllMusic | 4.5/5 stars |
| The Penguin Guide to Jazz | 3.5/4 stars |

The editors of AllMusic awarded the album 4½ stars, and writer Michael G. Nastos called it "excellent."

The authors of The Penguin Guide to Jazz Recordings described the album as "a valuable documentation both of Ward and of Woody Shaw, who sounds magnificent." They stated: "What is interesting about Lito is how effective a writer the saxophonist is."

Steve Vickery of Coda called the album a "last testament to the creative genius of Woody Shaw," and singled out "Sundance" for praise, noting that Shaw "glides through his solo, playing with the theme like a puzzle to be unravelled."

== Track listing ==
All compositions by Carlos Ward.

1. "Lito (1,2,3)" – 24:28
2. "Pettiford Bridge" (Dedicated to Oscar Pettiford) – 7:42 (bonus track on CD reissue)
3. "Lee" – 13:05
4. "First Love" (Dedicated to T. Monk) – 5:23
5. "Sundance" – 7:38

== Personnel ==
- Carlos Ward – alto saxophone, flute
- Woody Shaw – trumpet
- Walter Schmocker – bass
- Alex Deutsch – drums
