= Remembrances (David Murray album) =

Studio album by David Murray
- Released: 1991
- Recorded: July 30, 1990; Clinton Recording Studio, NYC
- Genre: Jazz
- Length: 52:20
- Label: DIW; DIW 849
- Producer: Kazunori Sugiyama

David Murray chronology
Special Quartet (1990)	Remembrances (1991)	Shakill's Warrior (1991)

Remembrances is an album by David Murray recorded in 1990 and released on the Japanese DIW label in 1991. It features performances by Murray with Hugh Ragin, Dave Burrell, Wilber Morris and Tani Tabbal.

== Reception ==
The Allmusic review awarded the album 3 stars.

Professional ratings
Review scores
Source	Rating
Allmusic	3/5 stars

== Track listing ==
All compositions by David Murray except as indicated

1. "Lo-Chi-Lo" - 7:28
2. "I Want to See You Everyday of Your Life" (Dave Burrell, Monica Larsson) - 4:23
3. "Dartman" - 8:12
4. "Sometimes I Feel Like a Motherless Child" (Traditional) - :10
5. "Popolo Paniolo" (Burrell, Larsson) - 7:29
6. "Dextor's Dues" - 7:41
7. "Remembrances" - 5:12

== Personnel ==
- David Murray - tenor saxophone
- Hugh Ragin - trumpet
- Dave Burrell - piano
- Wilber Morris - bass
- Tani Tabbal - drums
