= Tzotzil/Mummers/Tzotzil =

Live album by Cecil Taylor
- Released: 1988
- Recorded: November 13, 16 & 17, 1987
- Genre: Free jazz
- Length: 55:42
- Label: Leo

Cecil Taylor chronology
Live in Vienna (1988)	Tzotzil/Mummers/Tzotzil (1988)	Chinampas (1988)

Tzotzil/Mummers/Tzotzil is a live album by Cecil Taylor recorded in Paris on November 13, 1987 with overdubbed poetry recorded in London on November 16 & 17. It was released on the Leo label and the concert performance features Taylor with Thurman Barker, William Parker, Carlos Ward and Leroy Jenkins.

== Reception ==
Professional ratings
Review scores
Source	Rating
Allmusic	4.5/5 stars

The Allmusic review by Thom Jurek states "This is perhaps one of the oddest recordings that Cecil Taylor did for Leo. It begins, simply enough, with him reading his oblique, nearly totally incomprehensible poetry — which doesn't make it bad — then his band enters and he takes it out with some of the rhythm section accompanying him as he reads some more. Simple enough right? All except for the fact that the music was recorded three days before any of the vocals were, and in a different country. The poetry was recorded England and the music three days earlier in Paris. Ok, weirdness aside (and it is weird hearing Taylor's voice multi-tracked), the band is stellar... Taylor is leading the charge and all of these players know how to follow him, down an improvisatory highway that leads straight into a darkness beyond language. And perhaps, as he re-enters with his poetry at the very end of the work, that's what it's about anyway, going beyond language, ever beyond the place where it occurs to the place where it is conceived in spoken word and in music, which is but an extension of the human voice".

== Track listing ==
All compositions by Cecil Taylor.

1. "Tzotzil/Mummers/Tzotzil" - 55:42

- Recorded in Paris on November 13, 1987 with overdubbed poetry recorded in London on November 16 & 17

== Personnel ==
- Cecil Taylor: piano, voice
- Thurman Barker: marimba, drums
- William Parker: bass
- Carlos Ward: alto saxophone, flute
- Leroy Jenkins: violin
