= Eternal Now =

Studio album by Don Cherry
- Released: 1974
- Recorded: April 30 and May 1, 1973
- Genres: World music, world fusion
- Length: 37:40
- Label: Sonet
- Producer: Keith Knox

Don Cherry chronology
Relativity Suite (1973)	Eternal Now (1974)	Orient (1974)

Eternal Now is a studio album by jazz trumpeter Don Cherry recorded in 1973 and released on the Swedish Sonet label.

The album was reissued by Sonet on CD in 1996, paired with Live Ankara, with the title The Sonet Recordings.

== Reception ==
Professional ratings
Review scores
Source	Rating
AllMusic	4/5 stars
Tom Hull – on the Web	B+

The AllMusic review by Steve Huey awarded the album 4 stars stating "the whole point is to explore new musical possibilities and commonalities among cultures. While the results do meander occasionally, Eternal Now on the whole remains a fresh, unpredictable listen."

The authors of The Penguin Guide to Jazz Recordings wrote: "Aficionados of the Scandinavian scene will cherish a track featuring the great tenorist Bernt Rosengren on tarogato... 'Love Train' is perhaps the most jazz-based piece on the session. The remaining tracks are squarely in the world music idiom that Cherry was to make his own in years to come."

== Track listing ==
All compositions by Don Cherry except as indicated

1. "Gamla Stan – The Old Town by Night" – 8:27
2. "Love Train" – 7:50
3. "Bass Figure for Ballatune" (Chris Bothen) – 3:44
4. "Moving Pictures for the Ear" (Bothen, Cherry) – 9:40
5. "Tibet" – 7:59
  - Recorded at Studio Decibel in Stockholm, Sweden on April 30 (tracks 2–4) and May 1 (tracks 1 & 5), 1973.

== Personnel ==
- Don Cherry – trumpet, piano, harmonium, vocals, h'suan, daster, gong
- Bengt Berger – piano, Tibetan bells, African finger piano, mridangam, cymbal
- Christer Bothén – piano, dousso n'koni [sic], Tibetan bells
- Bernt Rosengren – tárogató
- Agneta Ernström – Tibetan bells, dousso kynia [sic]
