= Five to Go =

Studio album by Don Pullen
- Released: 1975
- Recorded: July 29, 1975
- Genre: Jazz
- Length: 46:00
- Label: Horo
- Producer: Aldo Sinesio

Don Pullen chronology
Jazz a Confronto 21 (1975)	Five to Go (1975)	Capricorn Rising (1975)

Five to Go is an album by American jazz pianist Don Pullen recorded in Rome in 1975 and released on the Horo label.

== Reception ==
The Allmusic review by Brian Olewnick awarded the album 3 stars stating "The two side-long pieces here, which appear to have been largely improvised, tend toward the more outside end of the spectrum... the finer moments of Five to Go make it a valuable document in this late musician's discography.

== Track listing ==
All compositions by Don Pullen

1. "Five to Go" - 24:40
2. "Four Move" - 21:10

Recorded in Rome, Italy on July 29, 1975

== Personnel ==
- Don Pullen – piano
