= Live in Bologna (Cecil Taylor album) =

Live album by Cecil Taylor
- Released: 1987
- Recorded: November 3, 1987
- Genre: Free jazz
- Length: 82:11 (Double LP); 69:53 (CD)
- Label: Leo

Cecil Taylor chronology
Olu Iwa (1986)	Live in Bologna (1987)	Live in Vienna (1987)

Live in Bologna is a live album by Cecil Taylor recorded in Bologna on November 3, 1987 and released on the Leo label. The album features a concert performance by Taylor with Thurman Barker, William Parker, Carlos Ward and Leroy Jenkins.

The compact disc reissue of this album omits the encore at the end and edits about five minutes of music from what was side two of the original 2-LP set.

== Reception ==
Professional ratings
Review scores
Source	Rating
Allmusic	4.5/5 stars
DownBeat	5/5 stars
The Penguin Guide to Jazz Recordings	3/4 stars

The AllMusic review by Stephen Cook states: "Having suffered the passing of longtime musical partner Jimmy Lyons just a year prior, pianist Cecil Taylor enlisted alto saxophonist and flute player Carlos Ward as a replacement for a series of European dates in 1987. Filling out the group were percussionist Thurman Barker and violinist Leroy Jenkins (both veterans of Chicago's trailblazing AACM free jazz collective), as well as bassist William Parker. The new group members proved to be up to Taylor's capricious and galvanizing ways on this Bologna concert recording, not only providing sympathetic support for the pianist's expansive explorations, but also creating uniquely improvised statements of their own... Although this is a great Taylor release, certainly essential for fans, Live in Bologna might not be the best disc for newcomers. Curious listeners should start with either of Taylor's mid-'60s Blue Note discs (Unit Structures and Conquistador!), or check out later titles like 1986's live solo piano recording For Olim and his A&M trio date In Floresence".

Writing for The New York Times, John Rockwell commented: "Even those who respect Mr. Taylor's feisty independence and remarkable technical facility have complained about what seems like an excessively unrelieved assault of aggressive energy: it's involving, even thrilling, but it cries out for moments of relaxation to set the energy into relief... Those moments come here. The members of the quintet seem especially responsive to Mr. Taylor and to one another, and there are long passages of really lovely quiet music to be enjoyed for themselves and to prepare for the patented steady-state climaxes. Particularly on the second side, when Mr. Barker's marimba is partnered by soft flute and airy piano, along with what sounds like the happy chanting and chatting of an African ethnomusicological recording, an almost gentle Taylor begins to emerge... Not that he's lost his bite. Gradually his piano transforms this material into something edgy and uneasy, and soon enough we're back to manic angst. Yet all in all, the range of moods and styles and textures on this set is wide indeed, and welcome in its reach... Still evident, especially in a group as attuned to itself as this one seems to be, is the delicate, fascinating, only dimly graspable way in which composition and improvisation interact; much of the interest of the music, in fact, lies in the very effort one is willing to make to perceive that mystery."

== Track listing ==
All compositions by Cecil Taylor.

1. "Live in Bologna" - 69:53

- Recorded in Bologna on November 3, 1987

== Personnel ==
- Cecil Taylor: piano, voice
- Thurman Barker: marimba, drums
- William Parker: bass
- Carlos Ward: alto saxophone, flute
- Leroy Jenkins: violin
