= Healing Force =

Studio album by Don Pullen
- Released: 1976
- Recorded: October 23, 1976
- Genre: Jazz
- Length: 51:33
- Label: Black Saint
- Producer: Giacomo Pellicciotti

Don Pullen chronology
Capricorn Rising (1975)	Healing Force (1976)	Tomorrow's Promises (1977)

Healing Force is an album by American jazz pianist Don Pullen recorded in 1976 for the Italian Black Saint label.

== Reception ==
The Allmusic review awarded the album 4 stars.

Professional ratings
Review scores
Source	Rating
Allmusic	4/5 stars
The Penguin Guide to Jazz	3/4 stars

== Track listing ==
All compositions by Don Pullen

1. "Pain Inside" - 15:51
2. "Tracey's Blues" - 8:32
3. "Healing Force" - 8:28
4. "Keep on Steppin'" - 18:42

- Recorded at Barigozzi Studio in Milano, Italy on October 23, 1976

== Personnel ==
- Don Pullen - piano
