= What It Is? Ed Blackwell Project Vol. 1 =

Live album by Ed Blackwell
- Released: 1993
- Recorded: August 8, 1992
- Venue: Yoshi's, Oakland, California
- Genre: Jazz
- Length: 1:01:25
- Label: Enja Records; ENJ-7089 2
- Producer: Kunle Mwanga

What It Is? Ed Blackwell Project Vol. 1 is a live album by drummer Ed Blackwell. It was recorded in August 1992 at Yoshi's in Oakland, California, and was released by Enja Records in 1993. On the album, Blackwell is joined by saxophonist and flutist Carlos Ward, cornetist Graham Haynes, and bassist Mark Helias. The album, which is the companion to What It Be Like? Ed Blackwell Project Vol. 2, is one of Blackwell's last recordings; he died in October 1992.

== Reception ==
Professional ratings
Review scores
Source	Rating
AllMusic	3/5 stars
The Penguin Guide to Jazz	3/4 stars
The Rolling Stone Jazz & Blues Album Guide	4/5 stars

In a review for AllMusic, Michael G. Nastos wrote: "Despite his failing health, Blackwell's skills on his drum kit were razor-sharp when he got on the bandstand for this headliner's gig... just two months before he passed away. Everything clicks -- the band is tight, powered by the supple bass of Mark Helias, while saxophonist/flutist Carlos Ward and trumpeter Graham Haynes play inspired, almost possessed improvs and written lines... this particular volume is his best work as a leader, and a great example of where modern jazz in the '90s landed. A must-buy for all."

Writing for Modern Drummer magazine, Mark Griffith commented: "Ed Blackwell Projects Volumes 1 and 2 are amazing examples of Ed's chanting and rolling style of drumming. But these last recordings are as much life lessons as drum lessons. At the end of his life Ed was very ill. His kidneys were in complete failure. Simple things like moving around were often a real chore — let alone playing the drums. Still, he traveled across the country to make a gig in San Francisco, where he made these two records. On each track, his drumming snaps and crackles with youth and excitement. There is absolutely no indication that he was less than two months away from the end."

== Track listing ==
1. "Introduction" – 0:25
2. "'Nette" (Ward) – 8:24
3. "Pettiford Bridge" (Ward) – 12:47
4. "Beau Regard" (Helias) – 13:02
5. "Thumbs Up" (Helias) – 10:58
6. "Mallet Song" (Ward) – 3:19
7. "Rosa Takes A Stand (For Rosa Parks)" (Ward) – 11:55
8. "Applause" – 0:35

== Personnel ==
- Carlos Ward – alto saxophone, flute
- Graham Haynes – cornet
- Mark Helias – bass
- Ed Blackwell – drums
