= Solo Piano Album =

Studio album by Don Pullen
- Released: 1975
- Recorded: February 24, 1975
- Genre: Jazz
- Length: 43:24
- Label: Sackville
- Producer: Bill Airey Smith

Don Pullen chronology
Nommo (1966)	Solo Piano Album (1975)	Jazz a Confronto 21 (1975)

Solo Piano Album is an album by American jazz pianist Don Pullen recorded in 1975 for the Canadian Sackville label. In 2014 Delmark Records, which purchased the catalog of the Sackville label, reissued the album under the title Richard's Tune with two bonus tracks.

== Reception ==
The AllMusic review by Scott Yanow awarded the album 3 stars stating "Don Pullen's debut as a leader around a decade after he first appeared on the ESP label as a sideman finds the percussive and adventurous pianist already displaying a fairly distinctive style".

Professional ratings
Review scores
Source	Rating
AllMusic	3/5 stars
The Penguin Guide to Jazz	3.5/4 stars

== Track listing ==
All compositions by Don Pullen

1. "Richard's Tune" - 8:25
2. "Suite (Sweet) Malcom (Part 1: Memories and Gunshots)" - 15:39
3. "Big Alice" - 10:07
4. "Song Played Backwards" - 9:13

- Recorded at Thunder Sound in Toronto, Canada on February 24, 1975

Richard's Tune bonus tracks (Delmark CD reissue)

5. "Kadji" - 8:29
6. "Big Alice (alternate)" - 9:18

== Personnel ==
- Don Pullen - piano
