= More (Giuseppi Logan album) =

Studio album by Giuseppi Logan
- Released: 1966
- Recorded: 1 May 1965
- Venue: Town Hall
- Studio: Bell Sound (New York City)
- Genre: Jazz
- Label: ESP-Disk

Giuseppi Logan chronology
The Giuseppi Logan Quartet (1965)	More (1966)	The Giuseppi Logan Quintet (2010)

More is the second album by American jazz saxophonist Giuseppi Logan, recorded in May 1965 and released in 1966 by the ESP-Disk label. The album features Logan on alto saxophone, bass clarinet, flute, and piano along with pianist Don Pullen, bassists Eddie Gómez and Reggie Johnson, and drummer Milford Graves.

Two of the tracks were recorded live on May 1, 1965, at the same Town Hall concert that yielded the Albert Ayler album Bells, and that also featured saxophonist Byron Allen as well as the last public performance of Bud Powell. The remaining two tracks were recorded at Bell Sound Studios in New York City later that month. In 2013, ESP issued a 50th Anniversary Remaster which included previously unissued music from Logan's set.

== Reception ==
Professional ratings
Review scores
Source	Rating
AllMusic	2/5 stars
DownBeat	5/5 stars
The Penguin Guide to Jazz	2.5/4 stars

In a review for AllMusic, Scott Yanow wrote: "This set matches his reeds with the young pianist Don Pullen, either Reggie Johnson or Eddie Gomez on bass and drummer Milford Graves. Despite his best efforts on the four blowouts (playing piano on 'Curve Eleven'), Logan is largely overshadowed by his sidemen on this CD reissue and his energetic and colorful solos are somewhat erratic."

Writing for Point of Departure, Stuart Broomer commented: "There's nothing to suggest premeditation: Logan's introductory yawps and sputters and sudden bursts of notes on bass clarinet, or his later flute interludes, don't suggest composition, and his rhythms seem provisional – both radical steps in 1965. Logan had succeeded in assembling the most innovative rhythm section of the day, with liberated polyrhythms and a crazy-quilt of splattered clusters generated by drummer Milford Graves and pianist Don Pullen, the group's outstanding soloist. The bassist on the May Day material is Reggie Johnson, an adept if relatively conventional musician... Logan is most potent on the studio piece 'Wretched Saturday:' he's playing alto saxophone with that trademark acidic lyricism and the bassist is Eddie Gomez, the quartet's original bassist and as significant a contributor to the band's special quality as Logan, Graves or Pullen. Gomez contributes rapid-fire bursts of notes that seem to bounce off Graves' slack-skin drum sound and intermingle with Pullen's percussive flights and Logan's vocalic utterance. On the unaccompanied piano solo 'Curve Eleven,' Logan’s stream of consciousness conception is presented in keyboard form, runs up and down the keyboard that dance percussively or float on a sea of sustain pedal, sudden bluesy interludes, dissonant chordings, and passages that momentarily resemble the modality of Ravel."

== Track listing ==
All compositions by Giuseppi Logan.

1. "Mantu" - 5:06
2. "Shebar" - 13:16
3. "Curve Eleven" - 8:39
4. "Wretched Sunday" - 11:05

Tracks 1–2 recorded at Town Hall, New York City, on May 1, 1965. Tracks 3–4 recorded at Bell Sound Studios in New York City in May 1965.

== Personnel ==
- Giuseppi Logan – alto saxophone, bass clarinet, flute, piano on track 3
- Don Pullen – piano
- Eddie Gómez – bass (track 4)
- Reggie Johnson – bass (tracks 1 and 2)
- Milford Graves – drums
