= Tomorrow's Promises =

Studio album by Don Pullen
- Released: 1977
- Recorded: 1976 & 1977
- Genre: Jazz
- Length: 44:07
- Label: Atlantic
- Producer: İlhan Mimaroğlu

Don Pullen chronology
Healing Force (1975)	Tomorrow's Promises (1977)	Montreux Concert (1975)

Tomorrow's Promises is an album by American jazz pianist Don Pullen recorded in 1976 and 1977 and released on the Atlantic label.

== Reception ==
The Allmusic review by Scott Yanow awarded the album 4½ stars, stating "This early Don Pullen recording helped introduce him to jazz listeners. The pianist is heard in a variety of settings. ... Pullen, a very rhythmic avant-gardist who can play inside or outside, was well-served by this release."

Professional ratings
Review scores
Source	Rating
Allmusic	4.5/5 stars

== Track listing ==
All compositions by Don Pullen except as indicated

1. "Big Alice" – 10:48
2. "Autumn Song" (George Adams) – 5:13
3. "Poodie Pie" (Morgan Burton, Sterling Magee, Don Pullen) – 6:36
4. "Kadji" – 8:16
5. "Last Year's Lies and Tomorrow's Promises" – 5:36
6. "Let's Be Friends" (Ira Warmack) – 7:38

== Personnel ==
- Don Pullen — piano, electric piano, clavinet
- George Adams — tenor saxophone, soprano saxophone, bass clarinet, flute
- Michal Urbaniak — violin (track 1)
- Randy Brecker (track 1), Hannibal Marvin Peterson (tracks 2–4) — trumpet
- Roland Prince, Sterling Magee – guitar (tracks 1, 3 & 4)
- İlhan Mimaroğlu — electronics (tracks 2 & 3)
- John Flippin – electric bass (track 1)
- Alex Blake — bass (tracks 2–4 & 6)
- Bobby Battle — drums, percussion (tracks 1–4 & 6)
- Tyronne Walker – drums (track 1)
- Ray Mantilla — percussion (tracks 1–4)
- Rita DaCosta – vocals (track 6)
