= Jazz a Confronto 21 =

Studio album by Don Pullen
- Released: March 21, 1975
- Genre: Jazz
- Length: 37:35
- Label: Horo
- Producer: Aldo Sinesio

Don Pullen chronology
Solo Piano Album (1975)	Jazz a Confronto 21 (1975)	Five to Go (1975)

Jazz a Confronto 21 is an album by American jazz pianist Don Pullen recorded in Rome, Italy, on March 21, 1975 and released on the Horo label as part of the "Jazz a Confronto" series.

== Reception ==
The Allmusic review awarded the album 4½ stars.

== Track listing ==
All compositions by Don Pullen except as indicated

1. "Calypso in Roma" – 7:55
2. "Sploogie Doo" (Dannie Richmond) – 11:36
3. "Dee Arr" – 6:18
4. "Traceys Of Daniel" – 11:48

- Recorded at Titania Studios in Rome, Italy on March 21, 1975

== Personnel ==
- Don Pullen — piano
- George Adams — tenor saxophone, flute, percussion
- David Williams — bass, percussion
- Dannie Richmond — drums, vocals
