= The Giuseppi Logan Quartet =

Studio album by Giuseppi Logan
- Released: 1965
- Recorded: 11 November 1964 or 5 October 1964
- Studio: Bell Sound (New York City)
- Genre: Jazz
- Length: 47:58
- Label: ESP-Disk

Giuseppi Logan chronology
The Giuseppi Logan Quartet (1965)	More (1966)

The Giuseppi Logan Quartet is an album by American jazz saxophonist Giuseppi Logan, recorded at Bell Sound Studios in 1964 and released in 1965 on the ESP-Disk label. His first recording as leader, it features Logan on alto saxophone, tenor saxophone, Pakistani oboe, bass clarinet, and flute along with pianist Don Pullen, bassist Eddie Gómez, and drummer Milford Graves. Logan had moved to New York City in September 1964, and the recording took place shortly after the October Revolution in Jazz, at which Logan performed, and during which he met ESP-Disk founder Bernard Stollman. According to Logan, the musicians had not played together prior to the recording session.

Milford Graves recalled: "After the New York Art Quartet recording, Bernard approached me and asked me to do something. Fine, but then I thought about Giuseppi. I told Bernard, 'I'm a young guy, and I have time. Let's give it to Giuseppi.' I don't know if Giuseppi ever knew that. So I just recorded with Giuseppi as a sideman; that's how that took place." However, according to Stollman, on the day of the recording, "Milford Graves and [Logan] filed through the studio and as they walked in to record, Giuseppi turned to me and said 'if you rob me, I'll kill you.' Milford was mortified—he had asked me to record Giuseppi—I'd given him a record date and he threatened me with death."

Regarding the recording session, Stollman stated:

When Giuseppi made his first album for ESP, I stood with Richard L. Alderson, the engineer, in the control room. I thought the piece they were playing was stunningly beautiful. It sounded totally spontaneous, as if they were engaging in an engrossing conversation. Suddenly, I heard a "thwuuunk," and I realized that the tape had run out. The engineer and I were so absorbed, we hadn't been paying attention. I thought, "Oh God, this remarkable thing is lost. It was interrupted in the middle, and it’s gone." Richard got on the intercom and said, "Giuseppi, the tape ran out." Without a pause, Giuseppi said, "Take it back to before where it stopped and we'll take it from there." So, Richard wound it back and played some bars of it and hit the record button, and they resumed exactly what they were doing—there was no way of telling where the break had occurred. It was unreal.

== Reception ==
Professional ratings
Review scores
Source	Rating
AllMusic	4.5/5 stars
The Penguin Guide to Jazz Recordings	3/4 stars

In his AllMusic review, Stewart Mason awarded the album 4.5 stars, calling it "one of the most uncompromisingly 'out' free jazz records of its time" and stating that the album "is definitely only for the free jazz faithful, but it's a solid, often fascinating set." Writing for The Wire, Pierre Crépon wrote that the album "is widely considered a free jazz classic, its use of odd meters and non-Western instrumentation preceding their common acceptance".

In an article for the New York Times, Giovanni Russonello wrote that on the album, "harmony, rhythm and melody became agents of texture and suspense: Whether Mr. Logan is playing in apoplectic fits or in a long atonal smear, the radical open-endedness of each moment is palpable." Elliott Sharp included the album in his list "Ten Free Jazz Albums to Hear Before You Die".

== Track listing ==
All compositions by Giuseppi Logan

1. "Tabla Suite" - 5:48
2. "Dance of Satan" - 6:17
3. "Dialogue" - 8:23
4. "Taneous" - 11:56
5. "Bleecker Partita" - 15:34

- Recorded at Bell Sound Studios, New York on November 11th, 1964

== Personnel ==
- Giuseppi Logan - alto sax, tenor sax, Pakistani oboe, bass clarinet, flute
- Don Pullen - piano
- Eddie Gómez - bass
- Milford Graves - drums
