= Helio Alves =

Brazilian jazz pianist (born 1966)

- Born: October 5, 1966 (age 59); São Paulo, Brazil
- Genres: Jazz, Brazilian jazz
- Occupation: Musician
- Instrument: Piano
- Years active: 1990s–present

Helio Alves (born 1966) is a jazz pianist and son of pianists.

He moved to Boston, Massachusetts at 18 to study at the Berklee College of Music. He remained in Boston until age 24, then moved to New York City on advice from a friend. He collaborated for many years with Claudio Roditi, including on the Grammy nominated Brazilliance X4 (2007). He was the featured soloist on Then Again as a member of the Paul Peress Trio. He was a member of the band Circlechant led by Santi Debriano and has worked with Rosa Passos, Joyce, Duduka da Fonseca, Airto Moreira, and Maucha Adnet. In 2003 he was pianist on the Grammy-winning album of Obrigado Brasil by Yo Yo Ma, Big Band by Joe Henderson, and Brazilian Dreams by Paquito D'Rivera.

== Discography ==
=== As leader ===
- Trios (Reservoir, 1998)
- Yatrata (Clavebop, 2003)
- Portrait in Black and White (Reservoir, 2003)
- Songs from the Last Century (Blue Toucan Music, 2005)
- It's Clear (Reservoir, 2009)
- Musica (Jazz Legacy, 2010)
- Milagre with Maucha Adnet (Zoho, 2013)

=== As sideman ===
With Santi Debriano

- 1999 Circle Chant
- Artistic License (Savant, 2001)

With Duduka da Fonseca

- 2002 Samba Jazz Fantasia
- 2006 Samba Jazz in Black & White
- 2012 Samba Jazz - Jazz Samba

With Carol Fredett

- 2009 Everything in Time
- 2014 No Sad Songs for Me

With Joe Henderson

- 1996 Big Band
- 2004 The Other Side of Joe Henderson

With Joyce

- 2007 Samba Jazz & Outras Bossas
- 2010 Slow Music
- 2015 Raiz

With Nilson Matta

- 2000 Encontros
- 2006 Walking with My Bass

With John Pizzarelli

- 2015 Midnight McCartney
- 2017 Sinatra & Jobim at 50

With Claudio Roditi

- 1995 Samba Manhattan Style
- 1997 Double Standards
- 2009 Brazilliance X4
- 2010 Simpatico

With others

- 2002 Brazilian Dreams, Paquito D'Rivera
- 2003 O Violeiro Mais Sertanejo Do Brasil Vol. 3, Paulinho da Viola
- 2003 Obrigado Brazil, Yo-Yo Ma
- 2004 Amorosa, Rosa Passos
- 2004 Embrace, Dave Pietro
- 2006 The Jobim Songbook, Maúcha Adnet
- 2007 Vision of Love, Christine Capdeville
- 2008 Forests, Brazilian Trio
- 2009 Bossa Beleza, Gabriela Anders
- 2009 The Time Keeper, Louis Hayes
- 2012 Constelação, Brazilian Trio
- 2012 Live in Berkeley, Airto Moreira, Flora Purim
- 2017 Portraits of Joni, Jessica Molaskey
