= Ode to Life =

Studio album by Don Pullen
- Released: 1993
- Recorded: February 18 & 19, 1993
- Genre: Jazz
- Length: 58:39
- Label: Blue Note
- Producer: Joanne Jiminez

Don Pullen chronology
Kele Mou Bana (1990)	Ode to Life (1993)	Live...Again: Live at Montreux (1993)

Ode to Life is an album by American jazz pianist Don Pullen and the African-Brazilian Connection, recorded in 1993 for Blue Note Records.

== Reception ==
The Allmusic review by Scott Yanow awarded the album 3 stars, stating "The music is more subdued than is usual on a Pullen disc, with the harmonies being less dissonant and the mood often melancholy and reflective but occasionally joyous. This is one of Pullen's more accessible and introspective sessions."

Professional ratings
Review scores
Source	Rating
Allmusic	3/5 stars

== Track listing ==
All compositions by Don Pullen except as indicated

1. "The Third House on the Right" (Alberto Beserra, Guilherme Franco) – 5:00
2. "Paraty" (Nilson Matta) – 9:00
3. "El Matador" – 6:29
4. "Ah, George, We Hardly Knew Ya" – 13:03
5. "Aseeko! (Get up and Dance!)" (Mor Thiam) – 11:59
6. "Anastasia/Pyramid" (Carlos Ward) – 7:06
7. "Variation on Ode to Life" – 6:02

- Recorded in New York City on February 18 & 19, 1993

== Personnel ==
- Don Pullen – piano
- Carlos Ward – alto saxophone, flute
- Nilson Matta – bass
- Guilherme Franco – timba, berimbau, percussion
- Mor Thiam – djembe, tabula, rainsticks, wind chimes, vocals
