= Montreux Concert =

Live album by Don Pullen
- Released: 1977
- Recorded: July 12, 1977
- Genre: Jazz
- Length: 39:57
- Label: Atlantic
- Producer: Herbie Mann & İlhan Mimaroğlu

Don Pullen chronology
| Tomorrow's Promises (1977) | Montreux Concert (1977) | Warriors (1978) |

Montreux Concert is a live album by American jazz pianist Don Pullen recorded in 1977 at the Montreux Jazz Festival and released on the Atlantic label.

== Reception ==
The Allmusic review by Scott Yanow awarded the album 4 stars stating "A masterful inside/outside pianist whose percussive solos often made his music sound more accessible than one would expect (considering the fact that he often played atonally), Don Pullen is heard on two extensive side-long explorations".

Professional ratings
Review scores
| Source | Rating |
|---|---|
| Allmusic | 4/5 stars |

== Track listing ==
All compositions by Don Pullen

1. "Richard's Tune (Dedicated to Muhal Richard Abrams)" - 18:10
2. "Dialogue Between Malcolm and Betty" - 21:47

- Recorded at the Montreux International Festival, Switzerland on July 12, 1977

== Personnel ==
- Don Pullen — piano
- Jeff Berlin — electric bass
- Steve Jordan — drums
- Raphael Cruz, Sammy Figueroa — percussion (track 2)
