= Riobec =

Live album by Cecil Taylor & Günter Sommer
- Released: 1989
- Recorded: June 17, 1988
- Venue: Kongresshalle, Berlin
- Genre: Free jazz
- Label: FMP
- Producer: Jost Gebers

Cecil Taylor chronology
Chinampas (1988)	Riobec (1989)	In East Berlin (1988)

Riobec is a live album by pianist Cecil Taylor and drummer Günter Sommer recorded in Berlin on June 17, 1988 as part of month-long series of concerts by Taylor and released on the FMP label.

In the album liner notes, Sommer is quoted as saying, "To play with Cecil Taylor is a challenge, in many different ways, also on the physical level. Just to have the stamina to last out over a period of one to two hours of extremely active playing is a minimum requirement. At the same time you have to be able to rely on the flow of your own ideas, what you try to impart. Not only just reacting to his music, but keeping up with him, bringing in your own material... We had only improvised together for about twenty minutes that afternoon and so, for the concert, I had to rely on my own fund of experience. The fact that Taylor gives the same importance to each and every note as part of the Whole, made me treat my drums differently. Every single piece, even the cymbal stands, every drum, had the same value, and that is not usually the case. But the continuous 'vibrations' coming from the piano that struck my equipment and were then bounced around, set the whole thing oscillating, anyway."

== Reception ==
Professional ratings
Review scores
Source	Rating
AllMusic	4.5/5 stars
The Penguin Guide to Jazz Recordings	4/4 stars
The Virgin Encyclopedia of Jazz	4/5 stars

The AllMusic review by Thom Jurek states, "This is Taylor at his most playful, creating moods and shapes and colors to be reacted to emotionally, which is something he almost never does. Sommer, one of the great if underappreciated European percussionists, is content here to be a detailer of Taylor's visions. He places his own percussive imagination at the service of Taylor's pianistic articulation and theatricality and, as a result, it works very well. These players don't come from many places in common, so they move together in a flurry of elegant ideas that are stretched endlessly to the margin before another is produced. The cinematic effect of this music is absolutely uncanny over the suite's four parts. While listening, one gets the impression of a pair of angels making mischief right under the nose of God. The sheer joy and smirky exuberance at play here make for a wondrous change of pace and mood for Taylor, and consequently offer listeners some of his most intimate and compelling music. Too often Taylor is regarded as a stern taskmaster and visionary whose connections to the roots of jazz are attenuated at best. Here the traces of Ellington and Fats Waller are everywhere, plainly there for the hearing. And Riobec, with the wildly comic and frenetic stylings of Sommer, proves once and for all that impression to be erroneous".

== Track listing ==
All compositions by Cecil Taylor & Günter Sommer.

1. "Riobec 1" – 29:13
2. "Riobec 2" – 13:13
3. "Riobec 3" – 24:43
4. "Riobec 4" – 6:44

== Personnel ==
- Cecil Taylor – piano
- Günter Sommer – drums
