= Chinampas (album) =

Studio album by Cecil Taylor
- Released: November 1987
- Recorded: November 16–17, 1987
- Genre: Spoken word, free jazz
- Length: 58:22
- Label: Leo
- Producer: Cecil Taylor

Cecil Taylor chronology
Tzotzil/Mummers/Tzotzil (1988)	Chinampas (1987)	Riobec (1989)

Professional ratings
Review scores
Source	Rating
AllMusic	4/5 stars
DownBeat	3.5/5 stars
The Penguin Guide to Jazz Recordings	2.5/4 stars

Chinampas is a spoken word album by avant-garde jazz pianist Cecil Taylor on which he reads his poetry accompanied by the sound of bells, tympani, and small percussion. Taylor performed all of the vocal and instrumental parts, which are overdubbed. A note on the album jacket states: "Chinampa – an Aztec word meaning 'floating garden'."

== Background ==
Chinampas was recorded at Doodlehums Studio in London on November 16 and 17, 1987, in sessions that overlapped with the recording of the spoken sections of Tzotzil/Mummers/Tzotzil, which also feature Taylor's poetry. According to Taylor, Chinampas is "about those extraordinary Aztecs", whom he referred to as his "distant relatives". Unlike other Taylor albums, on Chinampas the title of each track is simply its duration in minutes and seconds.

When asked how much of Chinampas was improvised, Taylor replied: "None of it. What was improvised were the instruments. What is also improvised is how the voice is used." In response to a series of questions regarding the overdubbing process, including "Do you hear all the voices at once, all the sounds? How do you go about layering sounds?", Taylor traced his influences back to his youth: "when I was like ten or eleven years old, mother... took me to hear all the bands. So that when I would come home, and I'd go into my room, I would imitate with my voice. I would make orchestral sounds, I would hear all of this in my head. I could make certain sounds that would be the trumpet, certain sounds would be the saxophone."

== Reaction ==
David Grubbs wrote: "On Chinampas, the individual pieces move in beautifully modulated long arcs of sometimes frenetic activity not unlike his solo piano concerts and recordings; they travel from the lowest register of speaking voice to the highest range of squeaking voice... the artist... less signaling through the flames than forcing air through an increasingly constricted windpipe, pitch ascending all the while... the voice leaping sufficiently and uncannily high so as to sound at a handful of especially chilling moments like a panicked child... Occasionally a word is hammered into the ground through repetition, an obsessive handling or worrying or hectoring interrogation of a single note on the piano, a tremolo, that mocking tone, that perhaps self-mocking tone that ironizes, defamiliarizes — a technique for a favored subject: transformations that occur through natural physical processes, in one of Chinampas's resonant phrases, 'one mineral crystallizing into another.'"

AllMusic reviewer Thom Jurek wrote: "To address what these poems are about is a meaningless endeavor. It would be the same as trying to explain what his piano playing is about. It's all language; it's all music. In fact, these poems... tell the story of Taylor's approach to making music, creating solid matter from thin air, and then -- like the true shaman that he is -- transforming it into sand and blowing it away to make room for something else." He continued: "Taylor is making a new history in his poetics: one that comes from pre-Babylonian Egypt and extends into the centuries beyond this one, one that insists in communicating in a language that is only dotted with references to Western culture and its ideologies as a jumping-off point in both directions simultaneously. And to hear the moans, groans, giggles, squeaks, and peeps that come from a master of the trained voice is to hear these sounds -- interspersed as they are with words and phrases and percussive meanderings -- as part of the language we speak (even if we've never heard it before)." He concluded: "As an artist Mr. Taylor has gone where few have gone before him, let alone succeeded; this is what he is used to. But he may have surprised even himself in the sheer musicality of his mystical universal tome."

Poet and author Fred Moten, whose collection The Feel Trio is named after Taylor's trio with William Parker and Tony Oxley, wrote about the first section of Chinampas in his essay "Sound in Florescence (Cecil Taylor Floating Garden)". He describes the work as "A poetry... that is of the music; a poetry that would articulate the music's construction; a poetry that would mark and question the idiomatic difference that is the space-time of performance, ritual, and event; a poetry, finally, that becomes music in that it iconically presents those organizational principles that are the essence of music." Moten suggests that the listener "Let Taylor’s 'musicked' speech and illegible words resonate and give some attention to their broken grammar, the aural rewriting of grammatical rule that is not simply arbitrary but a function of the elusive content he would convey," and states that "the spoken words, the speaking of the words, are not an arbitrary feature but are instead constitutive of that which is not but nothing other than (the improvisation of) ritual, writing, ritual as a form of writing." Moten asks: "What kind of writing is Chinampas? Taylor presents no graphic system — if Chinampas is writing, it is so in the absence of visuality. Under what conditions, then, could Chinampas be called 'writing'? Perhaps within an understanding of writing more broadly conceived as nonverbal, as well as verbal, systems of graphic communication... It's not that Taylor creates visible speech; rather his is an aural writing given an understanding of writing that includes nonverbal graphic resources." He writes that Taylor "works the anarchic irruption and interruption of grammar, enacting a phrasal improvisation through the distinction between poetry and music in the poetry of music, the programmatic manifesto that accompanies the music, that becomes music and turns music into poetry."

== Track listing ==
All compositions by Cecil Taylor. The track names are their lengths.

1. "5'04"
2. "3'43"
3. "5'46"
4. "5'07"
5. "12'30"
6. "9'20"
7. "5'46"
8. "6'56"
9. "3'36"

== Personnel ==
- Cecil Taylor – poetry, voice, tympani, bells, percussion
