= Kele Mou Bana =

Studio album by Don Pullen
- Released: 1991
- Recorded: September 25 & 25, 1990
- Genre: Jazz
- Length: 55:36
- Label: Blue Note
- Producer: Michael Cuscuna

Don Pullen chronology
Random Thoughts (1990)	Kele Mou Bana (1991)	Ode to Life (1993)

Kele Mou Bana is an album by American jazz pianist Don Pullen and the African-Brazilian Connection, recorded in 1990 for the Blue Note Records.

== Reception ==
The AllMusic review by Michael G. Nastos stated: "Everything with this band clicks from the word go, as Pullen weaves his way through a panoramic world view that, in this limited CD format, seems like he's merely scratching the surface of what this ensemble is capable of".

Professional ratings
Review scores
Source	Rating
AllMusic	3.5/5 stars

== Track listing ==
1. "Capoeira" (Guilherme Franco) – 7:00
2. "Listen to the People (Bonnie's Bossanova)" (Don Pullen, Sandra Pullen) – 8:00
3. "Kele Mou Bana" (Mor Thiam) – 11:33
4. "L.V.M./Directo Ad Assunto" (Nilson Matta) – 5:13
5. "Yebino Spring" (Yebga Likoba) – 8:48
6. "Doo-Wop Daze" (Don Pullen) – 11:46
7. "Cimili/Drum Talk" (Thiam) – 3:16

- Recorded in New York City on September 25 & 25, 1990

== Personnel ==
- Don Pullen – piano
- Carlos Ward – alto saxophone
- Nilson Matta – bass
- Guilherme Franco – percussion
- Mor Thiam – percussions, vocals
- Keith and Tameka Pullen – vocals
