= In East Berlin =

Live album by Cecil Taylor
- Released: 1989
- Recorded: June 20–21, 1988
- Genre: Free jazz
- Label: FMP

Cecil Taylor chronology
Riobec (1988)	In East Berlin (1989)	Regalia (1988)

In East Berlin is an album featuring two concerts by Cecil Taylor, one solo and one accompanied by Günter Sommer, recorded in Berlin on June 20 and 21, 1988 as part of a month-long series of concerts by Taylor and released on the FMP label.

== Reception ==
Professional ratings
Review scores
Source	Rating
Allmusic	4/5 stars
The Penguin Guide to Jazz	4/4 stars
The Virgin Encyclopedia of Jazz	3/5 stars

The AllMusic review by Thom Jurek states: "The first disc features Taylor playing at the beginning of his residency in June, performing solo. As is characteristic, he begins slowly, but that's brief. The dynamics and hammering runs of enormous chord clusters and constructively built pyramids of middle-range and lower-register notes cascade from his hands in bursts in the opening section of the lengthy "Reinforced Concrete." Covering 65 minutes of this 72-minute set, this mammoth work allows all the wonderful elements of Taylor's sound architecture to be on display simultaneously... On disc two, recorded the next evening, Taylor is in duet with the great lyrical drummer Günter Sommer. Sommer has a true command of glissando, not only in his captivating and astonishing cymbal work (which opens the first of these three parts), but also his work on the floor tom, making it seem to dance in midair while holding down the fort. Taylor's interaction with him is one that is completely complementary. Taylor has been in dynamic, overpowering duos of force before — most notably with Sunny Murray — but what takes place here, perhaps because of its great energy, is something totally different. While this is free and unrehearsed, the relaxed notion of one player leading the other, following one another, and turning into and out of the angular structures feels effortless... Highly recommended".

The authors of The Penguin Guide to Jazz awarded the album 4 stars, and wrote: "thunder and lightning, light and shade, and brimful of music, even across two long CDs... The incredible richness of event continues, with barely a pause, in what was a remarkable period for the man."

Writing for The Philadelphia Tribune, Jules Epstein commented: "Recorded before the historic opening of the Berlin wall, Taylor heralded musically the strains of freedom in this stirring, and generally magnificent, performance. Indeed, while there is barely a recording in existence with a greater freedom, experimentation and independence, it is hard to find a more appreciative audience than the East Germans who attended this concert... the duets with drummer Günter Sommer... are awe-inspiring... Taylor's performance is titanic, leaving the serious listener spent and fulfilled."

== Track listing ==
Disc One

All compositions by Cecil Taylor.

1. "Reinforced Concrete, Part 1" - 13:43
2. "Reinforced Concrete, Part 2" - 20:33
3. "Reinforced Concrete, Part 3" - 30:22
4. "Stone, Part 1" - 1:47
5. "Stone, Part 2" - 1:13
6. "Stone, Part 3" - 1:13
7. "The Old Canal" - 2:00
8. "Stone, Part 4" - 1:47

- Recorded in Berlin on June 20, 1988

Disc Two

All compositions by Cecil Taylor & Günter Sommer.

1. "Puuc, Part 1" - 38:25
2. "Puuc, Part 2" - 22:37
3. "Puuc, Part 3" - 11:07

- Recorded in Berlin on June 21, 1988

== Personnel ==
- Cecil Taylor – piano, voice
- Günter Sommer – drums (Disc Two)
