= Carlos Ward =

Panamanian-born American musician (1940–2026)

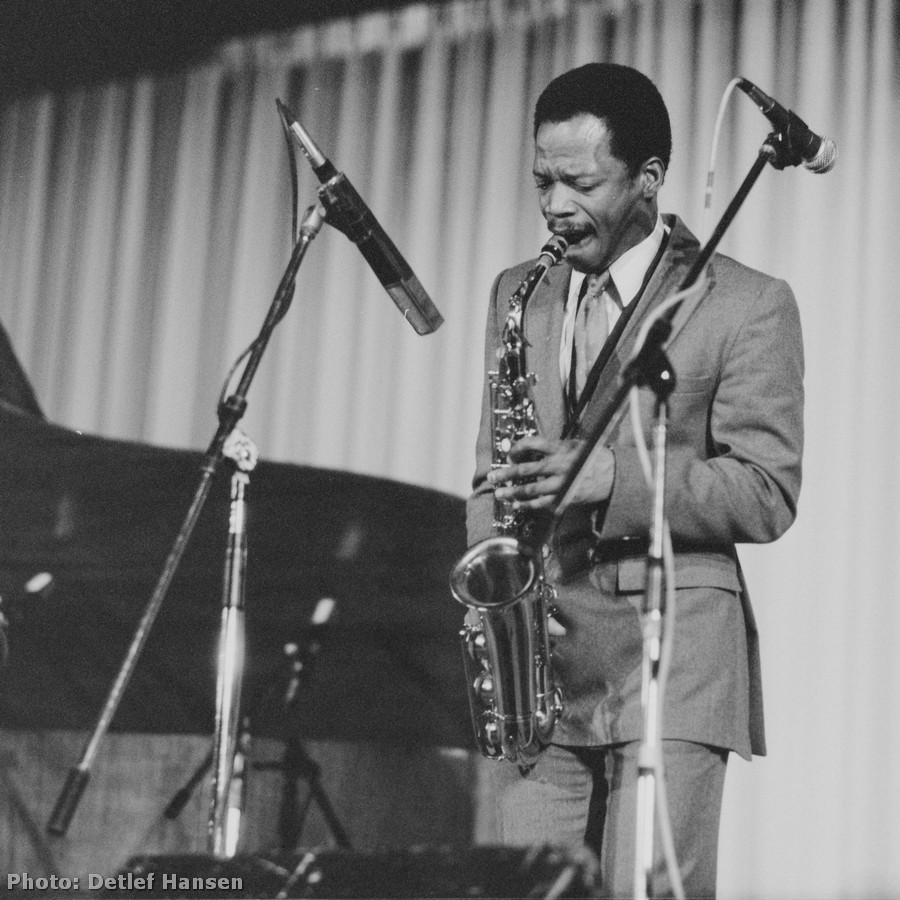
- Carlos Ward in Concert with Abdullah Ibrahim, Essen, Germany, 1985

Background information
- Born: May 1, 1940; Ancón, Panama
- Died: January 16, 2026 (aged 85)
- Genres: Funk, Jazz
- Occupation: Instrumentalist
- Instruments: Alto saxophone, flute

Carlos Ward (May 1, 1940 – January 16, 2026) was a Panamanian-born American funk and jazz alto saxophonist and flautist. He is best known as a member of the funk and disco band BT Express as well as a jazz sideman.

== Life and career ==
Ward was born in Ancón, Panama on May 1, 1940. He was raised in Panama City, and at a young age was exposed to a wide range of music, including Dixieland, classical, and Panamanian calypso. In 1953, he and his family moved to Seattle, Washington, where he began studying the clarinet. While in high school, he also picked up the alto saxophone, and began playing in rock and roll bands. During this time, he began listening to the music of Thelonious Monk, John Coltrane, and Ornette Coleman.

During the early 1960s, he joined the military, and studied at the Navy School of Music. While stationed in Germany, he met and played with Albert Mangelsdorff and Karl Berger, with whom he would record several albums. He also met Eric Dolphy, who encouraged him in his musical endeavours. In 1965, shortly before returning to the United States, he met and spent time with Don Cherry, who was playing with Abdullah Ibrahim (Dollar Brand).

In September 1965, while Coltrane was playing at the Penthouse in Seattle with his expanded group, Ward was allowed to sit in. He later recalled: "He let me come on stage, and immediately he could decipher what I was trying to do, by making motions with his hand how my ideas were going. He was going up and down, to the sides, and this is how we started. I would come and sit in with him a couple of nights... I would go to the hotel and meet with Pharoah [Sanders] and Raphael [Garrett], and they were talking about vegetarianism." Ward can be heard as part of this group on the Coltrane album A Love Supreme: Live in Seattle, released in 2021. In addition, the track "Afro Blue" recorded in Seattle on September 30 of that year, and released on Live in Seattle, featured an alto saxophone solo by an unidentified player. It has been speculated that this may have been Ward.

Following the Seattle performances, at the advice of Coltrane, Ward took a bus to New York. While there, Ward joined Coltrane's group during a week-long engagement in November at the Village Gate. In a review of one of the November concerts, A. B. Spellman wrote: "This was the first time I'd heard Panamanian altoist Ward. He seemed to be neither a screamer nor a singer, but a talker. He seemed to be engaged in some kind of a dialog with himself, playing a rapid series of terse, self-contained, but related phrases. I liked Ward; his ear is different. I couldn't sort out his influences in this cauldron, however, and I look forward to hearing him in a smaller group." On February 19, 1966, Ward performed with Coltrane's group at Philharmonic Hall, Lincoln Center, as part of another expanded group which also featured Albert and Donald Ayler.

While in New York, Ward met and played with musicians such as Sunny Murray, Rashied Ali, Henry Grimes, and Marzette Watts, and joined a version of Murray's Swing Unit. He also began playing and writing for the funk band B. T. Express, known for the best-selling single "Do It ('Til You're Satisfied)", and performed with the Jazz Composer's Orchestra, appearing on three of their albums. During this time, he played with Abdullah Ibrahim, with whom he would record nearly a dozen albums, and resumed his association with Don Cherry, appearing on the album Relativity Suite and later joining Cherry's band Nu.

Following the death of Jimmy Lyons in 1986, Ward joined Cecil Taylor's group, touring and recording three albums. In the late 1980s, he also released Lito, his first album as a leader, featuring trumpeter Woody Shaw. During the 1990s, he recorded with pianist Don Pullen and was a member of The Ed Blackwell Project. He led his own quartet in 1987, and, in the 1990s, recorded three additional albums under his own name.

Ward died on January 16, 2026, at the age of 85.

== Discography ==
=== As leader ===
- 1988: Lito (Leo) (with Woody Shaw)
- 1994: Faces (PM)
- 1995: Live at the Bug & Other Sweets (Peullmusic5)
- 1998: Set for 2 Don's Vol. 1 (CD Baby)

=== As sideman ===
With Ahmed Abdullah

- Dedication (CIMP, 1998)

With Pheeroan akLaff

- Sonogram (Mu Works, 1989)

With Rashied Ali

- New Directions in Modern Music (Survival Records, 1973)

With Harry Belafonte

- Paradise in Gazankulu (EMI, 1988)

With Sathima Bea Benjamin

- Dedications (Ekapa, 1982)
- Memories and Dreams (Ekapa, 1986)

With Karl Berger

- From Now On (ESP-Disk, 1967)
- Tune in (Milestone, 1969)
- Conversations (In+Out, 1994)

With the Ed Blackwell Project

- What It Is? Ed Blackwell Project Vol. 1 (Enja, 1993)
- What It Be Like? Ed Blackwell Project Vol. 2 (Enja, 1994)

With Carla Bley

- Dinner Music (Watt/ECM, 1976)
- Social Studies (Watt/ECM, 1981)

With B.T. Express

- Do It ('Til You're Satisfied) (Scepter, 1974)
- Non-Stop (Roadshow, 1975)

With Don Cherry

- Relativity Suite (JCOA, 1973)
- Multikulti (A&M, 1990)
- Live at the Bracknell Jazz Festival, 1986 (BBC Worldwide, 2002)

With John Coltrane

- A Love Supreme: Live in Seattle (Impulse!, 2021)

With Dennis González

- Hymn for a Perfect Heart of a Pearl (Konnex, 1990)

With Paul Haines

- Darn It! (American Clavé, 1993)

With Kip Hanrahan

- Coup de tête (American Clavé, 1981)

With Abdullah Ibrahim (Dollar Brand)

- African Space Program (Enja, 1973)
- The Third World-Underground (Trio, 1974) with Don Cherry
- The Journey (Chiaroscuro, 1977)
- African Marketplace (Elektra, 1979)
- Dollar Brand at Montreux (Enja, 1980)
- Duke's Memories (Black & Blue, 1981)
- Ekaya (Home) (Ekapa, 1983)
- Zimbabwe (Enja, 1983)
- Live At Sweet Basil Vol. 1 (Ekapa, 1983)
- Water from an Ancient Well (Tiptoe, 1985)
- South Africa (Enja, 1986)

With Frank Lowe

- Inappropriate Choices (ITM Pacific, 1991)

With Teo Macero

- Acoustical Suspension (Doctor Jazz, 1985)

With Nick Mason

- Nick Mason's Fictitious Sports (Columbia, 1981)

With Grachan Moncur III and the Jazz Composer's Orchestra

- Echoes of Prayer (JCOA, 1974 [1975])

With Paul Motian

- Tribute (ECM, 1974)

With Amina Claudine Myers

- Country Girl (Minor Music, 1986)

With the Paris Reunion Band

- We Remember Klook (Sonet, 1990)

With Don Pullen

- Kele Mou Bana (Blue Note, 1991)
- Ode to Life (Blue Note, 1993)
- Live...Again: Live at Montreux (Blue Note, 1993)
- Sacred Common Ground (Blue Note, 1995)

With Roswell Rudd and the Jazz Composers Orchestra

- Numatik Swing Band (JCOA, 1973)

With Bob Stewart

- Then & Now (Postcards, 2000)

With Cecil Taylor

- Live in Bologna (Leo, 1987)
- Live in Vienna (Leo, 1988)
- Tzotzil/Mummers/Tzotzil (Leo, 1988)

With Clifford Thornton and the Jazz Composer's Orchestra

- The Gardens of Harlem (JCOA, 1975)
