= Capricorn Rising =

Studio album by Don Pullen
- Released: 1975
- Recorded: October 16 & 17, 1975
- Genre: Jazz
- Length: 46:03
- Label: Black Saint
- Producer: Giacomo Pellicciotti

Don Pullen chronology
Five to Go (1975)	Capricorn Rising (1975)	Healing Force (1976)

Capricorn Rising is an album by American jazz pianist Don Pullen featuring saxophonist Sam Rivers. It was recorded in 1975 for the Italian Black Saint label.

== Reception ==
The Allmusic review awarded the album 4½ stars.

Professional ratings
Review scores
Source	Rating
Allmusic	4.5/5 stars
The Penguin Guide to Jazz Recordings	3/4 stars

== Track listing ==
All compositions by Don Pullen except as indicated

1. "Break Out" (Sam Rivers) - 12:35
2. "Capricorn Rising" - 11:48
3. "Joycie Girl" - 6:36
4. "Fall Out" (Rivers) - 15:04
  - Recorded at Generation Sound Studio in New York City on October 16 & 17, 1975

== Personnel ==
- Don Pullen - piano
- Sam Rivers - tenor saxophone, soprano saxophone, flute
- Alex Blake - bass
- Bobby Battle - drums, tambourine
