= Artistic License (album) =

Studio album by Santi Debriano
- Released: July 24, 2001
- Recorded: November 8, 2000
- Studio: Van Gelder Studio, Englewood Cliffs, NJ
- Genre: Jazz
- Length: 63:11
- Label: Savant; SCD 2037
- Producer: Santi Debriano

Santi Debriano chronology
Circlechant (1999)	Artistic License (2001)	3-Ololy (2006)

Artistic License is an album by bassist Santi Debriano which was recorded in 2000 and released on the Savant label the following year.

== Reception ==
Professional ratings
Review scores
Source	Rating
Allmusic	4.5/5 stars
The Penguin Guide to Jazz Recordings	3/4 stars

In his review on AllMusic, Scott Yanow wrote, "The music is post-bop, at times quite melodic, consistently stirring and filled with surprising moments, particularly when the music builds and builds to an intense level. Well worth several listens".

== Track listing ==
All compositions by Santi Debriano except where noted

1. "Holiday" – 6:44
2. "Tenor Pan Woogie" – 5:52
3. "Liberty Road" – 10:14
4. "Little Free Spirit Be" – 5:23
5. "Trance Dance" (Abraham Burton) – 10:40
6. "Brava" – 7:54
7. "Little Church" – 3:38
8. "Harmonious" – 5:58
9. "Leaving" – 6:48

== Personnel ==
- Santi Debriano – bass, steel drums
- Abraham Burton – tenor saxophone
- Miri Ben-Ari – violin
- Helio Alves – piano
- Will Calhoun – drums
- Willie Martinez – percussion
