= Shakill's Warrior =

Studio album by David Murray
- Released: 1991
- Recorded: March 1–2, 1991
- Studio: Sound on Sound, New York City
- Genre: Jazz
- Length: 72:49
- Label: DIW/Columbia (DIW 850)
- Producer: Kazunori Sugiyama

David Murray chronology
Remembrances (1990)	Shakill's Warrior (1991)	David Murray Big Band (1991)

Shakill's Warrior is an album by David Murray, released on the DIW/Columbia label in 1991. It features eight quartet performances by Murray with Stanley Franks, Don Pullen, and Andrew Cyrille.

== Critical reception ==
Professional ratings
Review scores
Source	Rating
AllMusic	4/5 stars
Christgau's Consumer Guide	A+
The Penguin Guide to Jazz Recordings	3.5/4 stars

Reviewing for Playboy in April 1992, Robert Christgau hailed Murray as "the most generous saxophone virtuoso since Sonny Rollins" and Shakill's Warrior "the funkiest record he's ever made", as well as "one of the most evocative". He highlighted the playing of Pullen, saying he and Murray "dig deep into the most declasse kind of organ jazz", and went on to write:

The music partakes of all the style's thick sexuality and soused soul—both men clearly love this stuff. But at the same time it seems distanced, decentered, a little off, conjuring a time warp in which a smoky '60s taproom in Watts or Newark is transported not just to 1992 but to 2000—to some scary future whose strangeness seems more natural every day.

Christgau later ranked Shakill's Warrior as the second best album of 1992 in his year-end "Dean's List" for The Village Voice's Pazz & Jop critics poll. In Christgau's Consumer Guide: Albums of the '90s (2000), he assigned the album an A-plus grade, although he later said in 2020, after relistening: "in what may have been the first time in 25 years, one thing became clear quick: not an A plus."

In another retrospective appraisal, AllMusic's Scott Yanow stated: "The music, with the exception of some typical Murray outbursts into the extreme upper register, is generally respectful and soulful, one of Murray's mellower efforts."

== Track listing ==
1. "Blues for Savannah" (Murray) – 7:26
2. "Song from the Old Country" (Pullen) – 7:01
3. "High Priest" (Cyrille) – 11:59
4. "In the Spirit" (Pullen) – 9:49
5. "Shakill's Warrior" (Murray) – 8:37
6. "At the Cafe Central" (Pullen) – 10:52
7. "Black February (Butch Morris) – 8:53
8. "Milano Strut" (Pullen) – 8:17

== Personnel ==
- David Murray – tenor saxophone
- Don Pullen – organ
- Stanley Franks – guitar
- Andrew Cyrille – drums
