= The Giuseppi Logan Quintet =

Studio album by Giuseppi Logan
- Released: 2010
- Recorded: September 15, 2009
- Studio: Magic Shop, New York City
- Genre: Jazz
- Length: 44:49
- Label: Tompkins Square Records
- Producer: Josh Rosenthal, Matt Lavelle

Giuseppi Logan chronology
More (1966)	The Giuseppi Logan Quintet (2010)	The Giuseppi Logan Project (2012)

The Giuseppi Logan Quintet is an album by American jazz saxophonist Giuseppi Logan, recorded in September 2009 and released in 2010 on the Tompkins Square label. The album, which includes five Logan originals and three standards, marks Logan's first recorded appearance following a hiatus of over 40 years, and features two of his collaborators from the 1960s, pianist Dave Burrell and drummer Warren Smith, along with bassist Francois Grillot and trumpeter / bass clarinetist Matt Lavelle. (Lavelle was largely responsible for bringing Logan back into the music world.)

The recording came about after Josh Rosenthal, who runs Tompkins Square Records, heard Logan playing in Tompkins Square Park and offered him a recording deal with an advance. Rosenthal recalled: "The main thing for me, to be honest, was just to make Giuseppi feel good and to give him some money and some CDs to sell in the park... He made his first record in 45 years, and that was enough. But the record was surprisingly well received."

== Reception ==
Professional ratings
Review scores
Source	Rating
AllMusic	4/5 stars
DownBeat	3/5 stars

In his AllMusic review, Thom Jurek awarded the album 4 stars, referring to the group as "a killer band" and writing: "By any measure, The Giuseppi Logan Quintet is an astonishing comeback record because of its sheer virtuosic facility, Logan's composing and playing so finely wrought, it's as if he never left! With this fine band behind him, we can only hope there is much more to come from him."

Writing for All About Jazz, Clifford Allen called the album "a welcome, if odd, recording. Throwing out any preconceptions of whether something 'works' is the best tack to take—if playing and recording gives Logan joy, camaraderie, recognition and a discographical calling card in his last years, who can argue?"

Peter Margasak, in a review for DownBeat, commented: "the arrangements, which swing elegantly, definitely push the music toward a brisk freebop sound, in contrast to the more metrically radical sound of his earlier work... there's a heartening tenderness and warmth to his playing—as if the opportunity to make music again has filled him with emotion—that's impossible to deny, and although the group was assembled specifically for the date, there's a strong sense of empathy across the board... there's something inspiring about his decision to lay it all out, warts and all."

In a review at the monk mink pink punk website, Josh Ronsen wrote: "His backing band... do a fine job in supporting Logan, making a record that is part beautifully in, and part strangely out. The fire of those ESP records might be gone, but this is far from tame... This is a fine, diverse record if you haven't heard it yet, and hopefully there will be more Logan records in the future."

Elliott Sharp commented: "While it is clear that Logan was without his instruments for quite a while, his atonal and surprisingly blue reed-work is undeniably compelling and deep. Some might claim that it is simply his rustiness, but there is a fascinating deconstructive approach that Logan takes to the quintet's version of Miles Davis' 'Freddie the Freeloader,' and it shows Logan embracing the same sort of irreverence for listeners' expectations and the upkeep of traditional 'purity' that made his past work so revolutionary and controversial."

== Track listing ==
1. "Steppin'" (Logan) - 7:57
2. "Around" (Logan) - 7:33
3. "Modes" (Logan) - 8:34
4. "Over The Rainbow" (Arlen, Harburg) - 4:16
5. "Bop Dues" (Logan) - 7:35
6. "Blue Moon" (Rodgers, Hart) - 3:01
7. "Freddie Freeloader" (Miles Davis) - 3:53
8. "Love Me Tonight" (Logan) - 2:00

- Recorded at The Magic Shop, New York on September 15th, 2009

== Personnel ==
- Giuseppi Logan - saxophone, piano (tracks 6 and 8)
- Matt Lavelle - trumpet, bass clarinet
- Dave Burrell - piano
- Francois Grillot - bass
- Warren Smith - drums
