= Selçuk Sun =

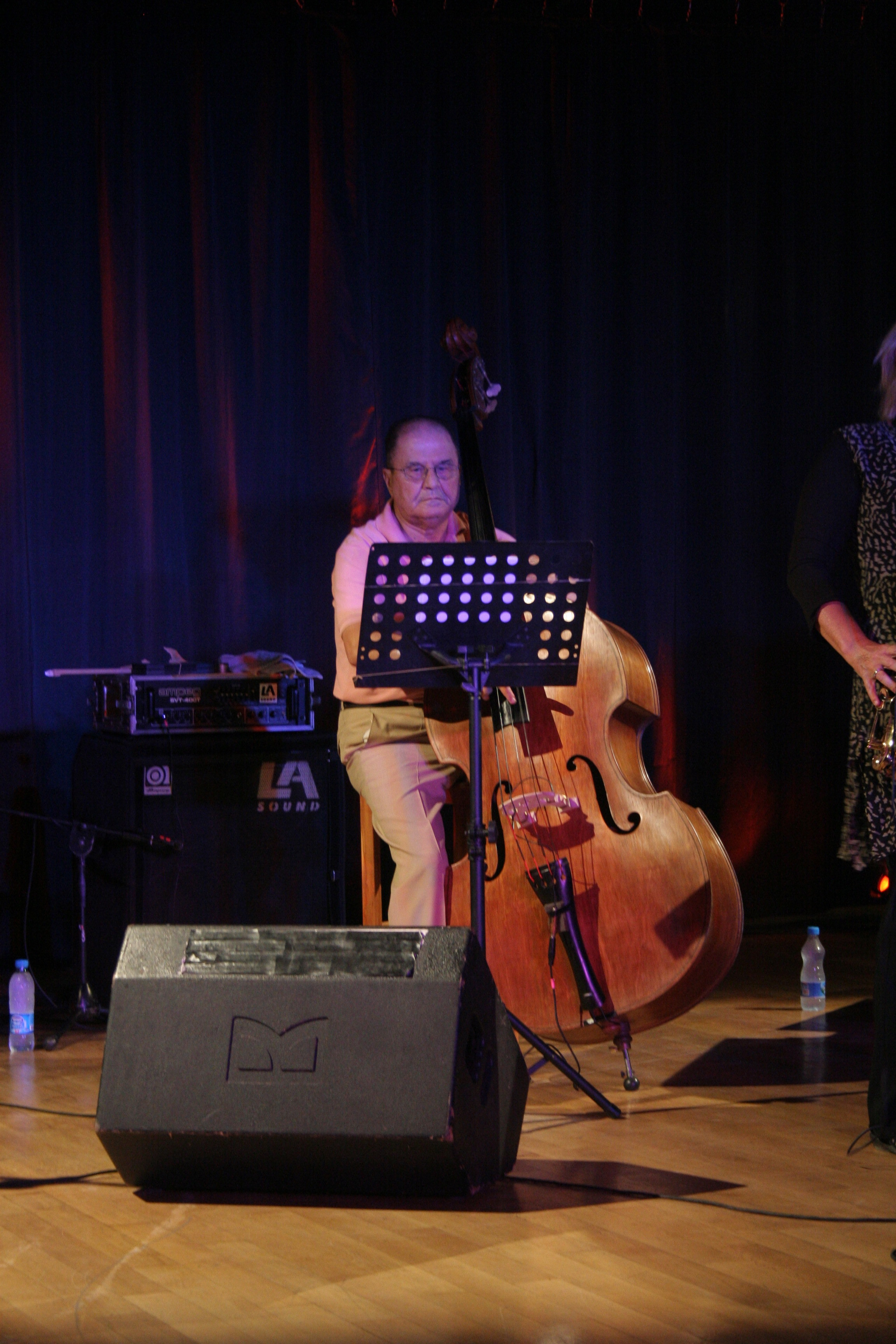
Selçuk Sun

Selcuk Sun (20 February 1934-22 March 2016) was a Turkish double bass player and one of the most significant jazz musicians in Turkey.

He was born on 20 February 1934 in Istanbul. He graduated from Ankara State Conservatory and went on to pursue his interest in jazz music. He met Muvaffak "Maffy" Falay whom he played with. Later he worked with Dizzy Gillespie (during his world tour in 1956), Phil Woods, Joe Gordan, Frank Rehak, Ernie Wilkens and Quincy Jones. During Dave Brubeck's tour in Europe and Asia, Selcuk Sun played with the Dave Brubeck Quartet in Ankara in 1958. He received a Scholarship from the Berklee School of Music, but could not attend due to his military service.

In the early 1960s he lived in Oslo and Copenhagen. In Copenhagen he lived for six months and played at the Jazzhus Montmartre with the pianist Bud Powell and the tenor saxophonist Lucky Thompson. The same year he came second at the "Young Double Bassists" Competition after Niels-Henning Ørsted Pedersen in Stockholm. While Don Cherry's stay in Ankara in 1969, Selcuk Sun along with Muvaffak "Maffy" Falay, Irfan Sümer and Okay Temiz on drums, held a concert. It was recorded at the American embassy and later released by Sonet Records as "Live Ankara". In 1962 he married his Norwegian wife and returned to Turkey. He joined the Presidential Symphony Orchestra and retired in 1980. Since then he has held several concerts and played on numerous festivals.

In 2006 he received the Lifetime Achievement Award at the Istanbul International Jazz Festival.
