= Live in Vienna (Cecil Taylor album) =

Live album by Cecil Taylor
- Released: 1988
- Recorded: November 7, 1987
- Genre: Free jazz
- Length: 90:27 (Double LP); 71:11 (CD)
- Label: Leo

Cecil Taylor chronology
Live in Bologna (1988)	Live in Vienna (1988)	Tzotzil/Mummers/Tzotzil (1988)

Live in Vienna is a live album by Cecil Taylor recorded in Vienna on November 7, 1987 and released on the Leo label. The album features a concert performance by Taylor with Thurman Barker, William Parker, Carlos Ward and Leroy Jenkins.

The compact disc edition of the album omits the encore at the end, comprising the bulk of side four of the original 2-LP set and also removes the printed interview included on the inner gatefold.

== Reception ==
Professional ratings
Review scores
Source	Rating
Allmusic	3/5 stars
The Penguin Guide to Jazz Recordings	3/4 stars

The Allmusic review by Stacia Proefrock states "One look at this recording and anyone familiar with the work of Cecil Taylor will know that it isn't for the faint of heart or spirit. An unbroken, hurricane of an album that extends for more than 71 minutes, Live in Vienna begins with a multi-voice poetry performance that descends into glossolalia and clucks, reminding the listener of the heyday of the Four Horsemen... Listening to this recording (and most certainly attending the performance that gave birth to it) might best be viewed as a ritual of endurance and cerebral submission. This is not meant as criticism, but the listener who fails to completely surrender to the music on Live in Vienna will most certainly be beaten bloody by the force of Cecil Taylor's work".

== Track listing ==
All compositions by Cecil Taylor.

1. "Live in Vienna" - 71:11

- Recorded in Vienna on November 7, 1987

== Personnel ==
- Cecil Taylor: piano, voice
- Thurman Barker: marimba, drums
- William Parker: bass
- Carlos Ward: alto saxophone, flute
- Leroy Jenkins: violin
