= Random Thoughts (Don Pullen album) =

Studio album by Don Pullen
- Released: 1990
- Recorded: March 23, 1990
- Genre: Jazz
- Length: 52:56
- Label: Blue Note
- Producer: Michael Cuscuna

Don Pullen chronology
New York Duets (1989)	Random Thoughts (1990)	Kele Mou Bana (1991)

Random Thoughts is an album by American jazz pianist Don Pullen, recorded in 1990 for Blue Note Records.

== Reception ==
The Austin American-Statesman wrote that "Pullen's characteristic linear logic method of soloing keeps even the most experimental musical excursions in line."

The AllMusic review by Richard S. Ginell stated: "As bent upon pianistic mayhem as Don Pullen often seemed, this was one of his more user-friendly discs, despite having only a bass and drums between himself and tender-eared listeners. Quite often, Pullen starts a piece as if it were a conventional piano trio number, but before long, he's piling up his trademark keyboard-shuffling glissandos, playing the instrument as if it was a big, glittering, percussive crashing board. Yet everything always swings.. Pullen manages to make even fearsome things seem approachable."

Professional ratings
Review scores
Source	Rating
AllMusic	4.5/5 stars

== Track listing ==
All compositions by Don Pullen

1. "Andre's Ups and Downs" – 5:19
2. "Random Thoughts" – 9:05
3. "Indio Gitano" – 9:39
4. "The Dancer" – 5:58
5. "Endangeried Species: African American Youth" – 7:36
6. "626 Fairfax" – 6:40
7. "Ode to Life" – 8:39

- Recorded in New York City on March 23, 1990

== Personnel ==
- Don Pullen – piano
- James Genus – bass
- Lewis Nash – drums
