= Mor Thiam =

Senegalese musician, historian, and consultant

Morgan Dogo Thiam (/ˈtʃɑːm/ CHAHM, born 22 May 1941) is a Senegalese musician, cultural historian, and entertainment consultant.

== Career ==
In 1973, Thiam recorded his first album, Dini Safarrar, to help victims of an African drought. The group was invited by President Nixon to perform at the White House in Washington D.C.

From 1990 to 1995, Thiam was part of Don Pullen & the African-Brazilian Connection, and recorded four albums as a member of Pullen's band.

In 1999, Thiam recorded his second album Back to Africa.

== Personal life ==
In 2009, Thiam made the Hajj pilgrimage to Mecca and devoted his life to the development of Darou Khafour and building the Mor Thiam Learning Center International School (MTLC).

Thiam resides in Orlando, Florida, and Dakar, Senegal. He is the father of singer Aliaune Badara Thiam (popularly known as Akon) and Bu Thiam.
