= Ronnie Mathews =

American jazz pianist

- Born: Ronald Mathews; December 2, 1935; New York City, New York, U.S.
- Died: June 28, 2008 (aged 72) New York City
- Genres: Jazz
- Occupations: Musician, composer, educator
- Instrument: Piano
- Labels: Prestige, East Wind, Bee Hive, Nilva

Ronald Mathews (December 2, 1935, in New York City – June 28, 2008, in Brooklyn) was an American jazz pianist who worked with Max Roach from 1963 to 1968 and Art Blakey's Jazz Messengers. He acted as lead in recording from 1963 and 1978–79. His most recent work was in 2008, as both a mentor and musician with Generations, a group of jazz musicians headed by veteran drummer Jimmy Cobb. He contributed two new compositions for the album that was released by San Francisco State University's International Center for the Arts on September 15, 2008.

Critics have compared him to pianists Thelonious Monk, Bud Powell, and McCoy Tyner.

== Biography ==
In his twenties, Mathews toured internationally and recorded with Roach, Freddie Hubbard and Roy Haynes. He was also a member of Art Blakey's Jazz Messengers in 1967 and 1968. By thirty, he began teaching jazz piano and led workshops, clinics and master classes at Long Island University in New York City. In the 1970s, he worked with Dexter Gordon and Clark Terry, and toured and recorded with the Louis Hayes-Woody Shaw Quintet and the Louis Hayes-Junior Cook Quintet.

One of the highlights of his career, and one of his longest associations, was with the Johnny Griffin Quartet. For almost five years (1978-1982) he was an integral part of this band and forged lasting relationships with Griffin, Kenny Washington (drums) and Ray Drummond (bass). The New York Times described Mathews as "a constant and provocative challenge to Mr. Griffin. [...He] is the energizer of the group". One of the few Johnny Griffin recordings that features Mathews' original compositions is "To the Ladies" (Galaxy).

In the 1980s, Mathews began leading his own bands, performing in duo, trio and quartet configurations in North America and Europe. He also toured with Freddie Hubbard and Dizzy Gillespie's United Nations Band. Mathews was pianist for the Tony Award winning Broadway musical, Black and Blue in 1989, and, in 1990, he was one of the artists who featured on the soundtrack of Spike Lee's Mo' Better Blues film.

After a stint touring and recording with the Clifford Jordan Big Band in the early 1990s, Mathews joined T.S. Monk for eight years of touring and recording. The Chicago Tribune stated that "The soul of the band [...] is pianist Ronnie Mathews, whose angular romanticism provides the horn players with a lush and spicy foundation for their improvising". Three albums were recorded with the T.S. Monk, Jr. Band, including The Charm.

In 1998, Hal Leonard Books published his collection of student arrangements: "Easy Piano of Thelonious Monk".

Mathews died of pancreatic cancer on June 28, 2008, in Brooklyn.

== Discography ==
=== As leader ===
- 1963: Doin' the Thang! (Prestige) with Freddie Hubbard
- 1975: Trip to the Orient (East Wind) with Louis Hayes, Yoshio Suzuki
- 1978: Roots, Branches & Dances (Bee Hive) with Ray Drummond, Al Foster, Frank Foster, Azzedin Weston
- 1979: Legacy (Bee Hive) with Ricky Ford, Bill Hardman, Walter Booker, Jimmy Cobb
- 1980: Song for Leslie (Red) with Ray Drummond, Kenny Washington
- 1985: So Sorry Please (Nilva) with Ray Drummond, Alvin Queen
- 1988: Selena's Dance (Timeless) with Stafford James, Tony Reedus
- 1989: At Cafe Des Copains (Sackville)
- 1990: Dark Before the Dawn (DIW) with Ray Drummond, Billy Higgins
- 1992: Lament for Love (DIW) with David Williams, Frank Gant
- 1995: Shades of Monk
- 2001: Once I Love with Walter Booker, Alvin Queen
- 2008: Fortuna with Roni Ben-Hur

=== As sideman ===
With Roland Alexander

- Pleasure Bent (Prestige New Jazz 1961)

With Art Blakey and the Jazz Messengers

- Live! at Slug's NYC (1968) (Everest 1977 as Art Blakey and the Jazz Messengers)
- Moanin' (Live) (Laserlight CD 1997) (completely different tunes than Slug's)

With Thomas Chapin

- I've Got Your Number (Arabesque, 1993)

With Larry Coryell

- New High (HighNote, 2000)

With Kenny Dorham

- The Flamboyan Queens NY 1963 (Uptown CD 2009) with Joe Henderson

With Teddy Edwards

- Ladies Man (HighNote, 2000)

With Dexter Gordon

- Homecoming: Live at the Village Vanguard (2 LPs Columbia 1976)

With Johnny Griffin

- Return of the Griffin (Galaxy 1978)
- NYC Underground (Galaxy 1979)
- To the Ladies (Galaxy 1980)
- Live / Autumn Leaves (Recorded 1980–1981) (Polydor Gitanes CD 1997)

With Bill Hardman

- Saying Something (Savoy 1961)

With Louis Hayes

- Breath of Life (Muse, 1974)
- Ichi-Ban (Timeless, 1976) with Junior Cook Woody Shaw
- The Real Thing (Muse, 1977)
- Blue Lou (SteepleChase, 1993)

With Roy Haynes

- Cracklin' (New Jazz, 1963) with Booker Ervin
- Cymbalism (New Jazz, 1963) with Frank Strozier

With Joe Henderson

- Big Band (Verve, 1997)

With Freddie Hubbard

- Breaking Point! (Blue Note, 1965)
- At Jazz Jamboree Warszawa '91: A Tribute to Miles (Sunburst, 1991)

With Sam Jones

- Visitation (Steeplechase 1979)

With Clifford Jordan

- Play What You Feel (Mapleshade, 1990 [1997])
- Down Through the Years (Milestone, 1991)

With T. S. Monk

- Take One (Blue Note, 1992)
- Changing of the Guard (Blue Note, 1993)
- The Charm (Blue Note, 1995)
- Monk on Monk (N2K, 1997)

With Frank Morgan

- Mood Indigo (Antilles, 1989)
- Reflections (HighNote, 2006)

With Lee Morgan

- The Rumproller (Blue Note, 1965)

With Sal Nistico

- Neo/Nistico (Bee Hive, 1978)

With Charlie Persip

- Charles Persip and the Jazzstatesmen (Bethlehem 1960)

With Max Roach

- Drums Unlimited (Atlantic, 1965)

With Woody Shaw

- Little Red's Fantasy (Muse, 1976)
- The Woody Shaw Concert Ensemble at the Berliner Jazztage (Muse, 1976)
- The Tour – Volume One (HighNote, 2016)

With James Spaulding

- Blues Nexus (Muse, 1993)

With Sonny Stitt

- Rearin' Back (Argo, 1962)
- Primitivo Soul! (Prestige, 1963)
