= Sound of Joy =

Studio album by Sun Ra and the Arkestra
- Released: 1968
- Recorded: November 1, 1956
- Genre: Jazz
- Length: 39:31 (LP); 47:41 (CD)
- Label: Delmark
- Producer: Tom Wilson

Sun Ra and the Arkestra chronology
Super-Sonic Jazz (1956)	Sound of Joy (1968)	Sun Ra and his Solar Arkestra Visits Planet Earth (1956-58)

Professional ratings
Review scores
Source	Rating
AllMusic	4.5/5 stars
The Penguin Guide to Jazz Recordings	3/4 stars
The Rolling Stone Jazz Record Guide	4/5 stars

Sound of Joy is an album by Sun Ra and his Arkestra. It features the Arkestral lineup during the last few months of 1956, after trombonist Julian Priester left to join Lionel Hampton, Charles Davis became a regular member of the band, and Victor Sproles took over on bass. It was intended as the follow-up to Jazz By Sun Ra but Transition Records ceased to operate before it could be released.

Four of the tracks were included on Sun Ra and his Solar Arkestra Visits Planet Earth, released in 1966. The entire LP was eventually released in 1968 by Delmark Records, who also re-issued Jazz by Sun Ra. Two ballads, written by Sun Ra and sung by Clyde Williams, were left off the original album, however, because the president of Delmark Records, Bob Koester, "felt they didn't fit with the other pieces on the session." The songs were reinstated when the album was re-issued on CD in 1994.

== Track listing ==
=== 12" vinyl ===
All tracks were written by Sun Ra, except "Two Tones", by Pat Patrick and Charles Davis.
Side A:

1. "El is a Sound of Joy" - (4.04)
2. "Overtones of China" - (3.25)
3. "Two Tones" - (3.41)
4. "Paradise" - (4.30)
5. "Planet Earth" - (4.24)

Side B:

6. "Ankh" - (6.31)
7. "Saturn" - (4.01)
8. "Reflections in Blue" - (6.21)
9. "El Viktor" - (2.33)

=== Bonus tracks on the CD ===
10. "As You Once Were"
11. "Dreams Come True"

Recorded at the Balkan Studios, Chicago, November 1, 1956.

== Personnel ==
- Sun Ra - Piano, Wurlitzer electric piano
- Art Hoyle - Trumpet
- Dave Young - Trumpet
- John Avant - Trombone
- Pat Patrick - Alto sax, baritone sax
- John Gilmore - Tenor sax
- Charles Davis - Baritone sax
- Victor Sproles - Bass
- William Cochran - Drums
- Jim Herndon - Tympani, timbales
- Clyde Williams - vocals (on the bonus tracks only)

== See also ==
Sun Ra discography
