= Gotstabe a Better Way! =

Studio album by James Spaulding
- Released: 1990
- Recorded: May 31, 1988
- Studio: Van Gelder Studio, Englewood Cliffs, NJ
- Genre: Jazz
- Length: 54:34
- Label: Muse; MR 5413
- Producer: Don Sickler

James Spaulding chronology
James Spaulding Plays the Legacy of Duke Ellington (1978)	Gotstabe a Better Way! (1990)	Brilliant Corners (1988)

Gotstabe a Better Way! is an album by saxophonist James Spaulding which was recorded in 1988 and released on the Muse label.

== Reception ==
Professional ratings
Review scores
Source	Rating
AllMusic	4.5/5 stars

The AllMusic review by Michael G. Nastos stated "Veteran saxophonist in his best light".

== Track listing ==
All compositions by James Spaulding except where noted

1. "Bold Steps" – 5:39
2. "Blue Hue" – 5:14
3. "Ginger Flower Song" – 6:10
4. "Remember There's Hope" – 5:55
5. "Little Niles" (Randy Weston) – 6:32
6. "Gotstabe" – 6:28
7. "In Flight Out" – 6:40
8. "I Have You" – 5:35
9. "Barbados" (Charlie Parker) – 6:21

== Personnel ==
- James Spaulding – alto saxophone, flute, piccolo
- Mulgrew Miller – piano
- Monte Croft – vibraphone (tracks 2–4 & 6–9)
- Ron Carter – bass
- Ralph Peterson Jr. – drums
- Ray Mantilla – congas, percussion
