= Dan Faulk =

Jazz musician

Dan Faulk (born 1969) is a jazz saxophonist, composer, and educator.

== Biography ==
Faulk was born in 1969. In 1992, he recorded Focusing In for Criss Cross Jazz. It was a quartet recording, with Barry Harris (piano), Rufus Reid (bass), and Carl Allen (drums). Four years later, Faulk recorded another quartet album – Spirits in the Night – this time with Myron Walden (alto sax), Joe Martin (bass), and Jorge Rossy (drums). It contained covers and Faulk originals. His third album as leader, Dan Faulk Songbook, Vol.1, was recorded in 2002. The other musicians were pianist Carlton Holmes, bassist Ugonna Okegwo, and drummer Terrill Will, and all ten tracks were composed by Faulk.

Faulk played tenor and soprano saxophones on James Spaulding's Blues Nexus. Faulk was part of trombonist J. J. Johnson's band in the late 1990s, including for the album Heroes. Faulk has also been professor of music at the State University of New York at Stony Brook.

== Discography ==
=== As leader/co-leader ===
- Focusing In (Criss Cross Jazz, 1992)
- Spirits in the Night (Fresh Sound, 1996)
- Dan Faulk Songbook, Vol.1 (Ugli Fruit, 2002)

=== As sideman ===
With J. J. Johnson

- The Brass Orchestra (Verve)
- Heroes (Verve)

With New York Unit

- Tribute to George Adams (Paddle Wheel, 1992)

With James Spaulding

- Blues Nexus (Muse, 1993)

With Akira Tana and Ralph Reid

- Blue Motion
