= Tyrone Jefferson =

American trombonist, composer, and arranger

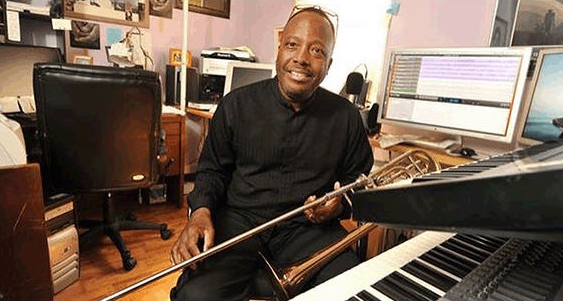

Background information
- Born: July 5, 1953 (age 73); New York City, United States
- Genres: Jazz; Soul; R&B
- Occupations: Trombonist, Composer, arranger and producer
- Instruments: Trombone; Piano

Tyrone Jefferson (born July 5, 1953) is an American trombonist, composer, arranger and producer. Over the course of his career, he has collaborated with acts such as James Brown, Public Enemy, LL Cool J and others.

== Early life and education ==
Tyrone Jefferson was born on July 5, 1953, in Manhattan, New York City. At a young age, he relocated with his family to Charlotte, North Carolina, where his interest in jazz began. After starting junior high school, he began to play the piano, then the trombone.

Jefferson holds a B.S. degree in electrical engineering from North Carolina Agricultural and Technical State University, an M.S. in Management Information Systems from Pace University and a Professional Certificate in Arranging and Composition from Berklee College of Music.

== Career ==
In high school, Jefferson led his own band, which included a trumpet player, tuba player, tenor saxophonist, and three percussionists. During this time he also experimented with songwriting and arranging for several instruments.

In the early 1970s, Jefferson joined the Army and completed a three-year tour in Kaiserslautern, Germany, where he would ultimately meet saxophonist Norwood "Pony" Poindexter. Poindexter later invited Jefferson to join him as a trombonist during his Sunday sessions at a Frankfurt club. Jefferson developed his musical skills as he began working with a number of German bands across several genres.

Upon his return to the United States, Jefferson began arranging live jazz sets at Damian's in Augusta, Georgia. These sets were named sittin' in and helped solidify his place in the local jazz scene. In 1976 he was given a chance by percussionist Johnny Griggs, to join James Brown on tour as director of Brown's band, The J.B.'s. After Jefferson's participation in the tour ended, he went on to collaborate with dozens of musicians, including James Brown, rappers Public Enemy, hip-hop artist L.L. Cool J and Gospel artist Heather Headley. Jefferson has performed in Argentina, Brazil, Canada, Europe, Japan, Morocco and the Caribbean, and at venues such as the Apollo Theater, Lincoln Center, Greek Theatre and the Staples Center.

Jefferson also joined Frank Foster's jazz ensemble Living Color: 10 Shades of Black, as well as Slide Hampton's World of Trombones. His work as a trombonist, songwriter, and composer and his dedication to African-American history and culture has led to profiles in Carib magazine, Black Elegance, Sister-to-Sister, Charlotte Magazine and Jet magazine. Jefferson was among the composers commissioned by the French Minister of Culture to write A Hymn for World Peace in 1984. He is also featured in Digging: The Afro-American Soul of American Classical Music by Amiri Baraka (2009).

== Activism and awards ==
Jefferson currently acts as executive director of A Sign of the Times of the Carolinas, a non-profit organization focused on reaching out to the community through music and educational programs that reflect the heritage of African Americans. In 2013, he was the recipient of the Harvey B. Gantt Center award.

== Discography ==
- Alex Bugnon – Head Over Heels (1990) – Trombone
- James Spaulding – Songs of Courage (Muse, 1991 [1993]) – Trombone
- Errol Parker – Errol Parker (1991) – Trombone
- Public Enemy – Apocalypse 91...The Enemy Strikes Black (1991) – Horns
- Pee Wee Ellis – Blues Mission (1992) – Trombone
- Errol Parker – Remembering Billy Strayhorn (1994) – Trombone
- James Brown – Live at the Apollo (1995) – Trombone
- Mark Ledford – Miles 2 Go (1998) – Trombone
- James Brown – Dead on the Heavy Funk (1975–1983) 1998 – Trombone
- Heather Headley – Audience of One (2009) – Trombone, Horn Arrangements

== Personal life ==
Jefferson currently lives in Charlotte with his wife Toni. They both host the weekly Saturday Night R&B House Party on Gaston College Radio and act as the producers of The State of Black Music on public access TV. He has three children and five grandchildren.
