= Charles Davis (saxophonist) =

American jazz saxophonist and composer

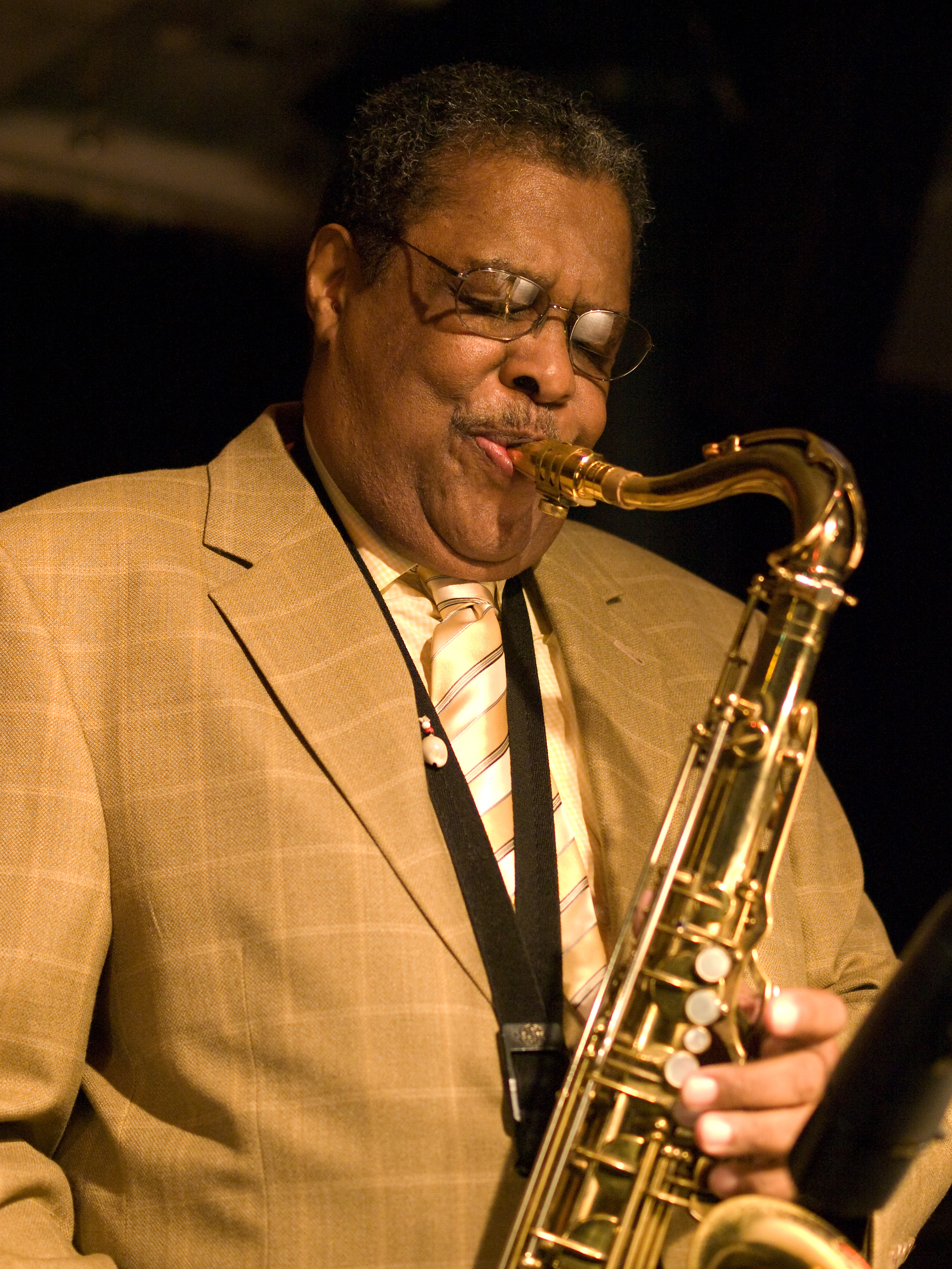
- Davis in Munich, October 2009

Background information
- Born: May 20, 1933
- Died: July 15, 2016 (aged 83)
- Genres: Hard bop, soul jazz, modal jazz, jazz rock
- Occupations: Saxophonist, composer, teacher
- Labels: Strata-East, Nilva, West 54, Red

Charles Davis (May 20, 1933 – July 15, 2016) was an American jazz saxophonist and composer. Davis played alto, tenor and baritone saxophone, and performed extensively with Archie Shepp and Sun Ra.

== Biography ==
Born in Goodman, Mississippi, Davis was raised in Chicago. After being sent to boarding school at St Benedict's in Milwaukee, he graduated from DuSable High School before studying at the Chicago School of Music. Davis also studied privately with John Hauser. During the 1950s, he played with Billie Holiday, Ben Webster, Sun Ra and Dinah Washington. Davis also performed and recorded with Kenny Dorham, with whom he associated musically for many years.

During the 1960s, he performed and recorded with Elvin Jones, Jimmy Garrison, Illinois Jacquet, Freddie Hubbard, Johnny Griffin, Steve Lacy and Ahmad Jamal, also working with Blue Mitchell, Erskine Hawkins, John Coltrane and Clifford Jordan. In 1964, Davis topped DownBeat magazine's International Jazz Critics Poll for baritone saxophone. He performed in the musical The Philosophy of The Spiritual – A Masque of the Black with Willie Jones, produced by Nadi Qamar. Davis taught at PS 179 in Brooklyn and was musical director of the Turntable, a nightclub owned by Lloyd Price.

During the 1970s, Davis was a member of the cooperative Artistry in Music with Hank Mobley, Cedar Walton, Sam Jones and Billy Higgins. He co-led, composed and arranged for the Baritone Saxophone Retinue, a six-baritone-saxophone group (with rhythm section) organised with Sun Ra-associated saxophonist Pat Patrick. Davis toured Europe, playing major jazz festivals and concerts with the Clark Terry Orchestra, and toured the United States with Duke Ellington’s Orchestra (by then directed by Mercer Ellington). As musical director of the Home of the Id nightclub, he presented Gene Ammons, Randy Weston and Max Roach. As producer of the Monday Night Boat Ride Up The Hudson, Davis presented Art Blakey, George Benson and Etta Jones. He appeared on television with Archie Shepp, Lucky Thompson, Ossie Davis and Ruby Dee.

During the 1980s, Davis performed and recorded with the Philly Joe Jones Quartet, Dameronia and Abdullah Ibrahim’s Ekaya in the United States, Europe and Africa and toured Europe with Savoy Seven Plus 1: A Salute to Benny Goodman. With his own quartet, he performed in Rome, at the Bologna Jazz Festival, the Jazz in Sardinia Festival and the La Spezia Festival. Davis was musical director of the Syncopation nightclub and performed in the film, The Man with Perfect Timing, with Abdullah Ibrahim. In 1984, he was named a BMI Jazz Pioneer.

Davis played in the Apollo Theater Hall of Fame Band with Ray Charles, Joe Williams and Nancy Wilson. He toured the Netherlands in a salute to the music of Kenny Dorham, and was a guest artist at the 12th annual North Carolina Jazz Festival at Duke University. A featured soloist with the Barry Harris Jazz Ensemble, Davis performs in clubs with the Barry Harris-Charles Davis Quartet. He recorded and toured Europe and Japan with the Clifford Jordan Big Band. Davis played tenor saxophone and arranged for Larry Ridley's Jazz Legacy Ensemble, which appeared at the Senegal Jazz Festival, performed concerts and conducted clinics, seminars and master classes. The ensemble also appeared in a concert series at the Schomburg Center for Research in Black Culture. He was a featured artist at the Amman Jazz Festival, produced by the American Embassy. Davis was also a featured artist in clubs and concerts in Paris, Toulouse and Hamburg. He appeared at the Williamstown Theatre Festival in the original production of Eduardo Machado's Stevie Wants to Play the Blues, directed by Jim Simpson. Davis played in the Three Baritone Saxophone Band with Ronnie Cuber and Gary Smulyan (touring Italy) and appeared at the New Orleans Jazz Festival, the 1998 JVC Jazz & Image Festival at Villa Celimontana in Rome and Ronnie Scott's Jazz Club in London. The saxophonist was a featured soloist at the 1998 Chicago Jazz Festival. In June 1999, Davis performed with Aaron Bell and the Duke Ellington Tribute Orchestra at the Jackie Robinson Afternoon of Jazz Festival in Norwalk, Connecticut. He was a featured artist at the 1999 Jazz & Image Festival.

Beginning in 2000, Davis was a featured artist at the Blue Note in Beirut, clubs in Italy and Spain and at the 2000 Jazz & Image Festival. With his quartet, he played on the M.S. Dynasty, a Carnival Cruise Lines ship. Davis produced and performed in the Tribute to Stanley Turrentine concert in Philadelphia. In August 2001, he performed for President Bill Clinton at the Harlem Welcomes Clinton celebration. The Barry Harris-Charles Davis Quintet appeared several times at Sweet Basil in New York City and continues to perform together, including yearly appearances at Birdland. In August 2004, they performed for the 50th Anniversary of the Newport Jazz Festival. Davis was a featured artist at the 14th annual Jazz Festival in Badajoz, Spain, and was a member of the Walter Booker Quintet. He performed with his quartet at New York's Rubin Museum of Art and performed in the Netherlands, Denmark and Israel. In addition to performing and recording with guitarist Roni Ben-Hur and the El Mollenium Band (featuring the music of Elmo Hope), in 2009 Davis toured Germany, Austria, Switzerland and Italy with the Charles Davis All-stars: A Tribute to Kenny Dorham; the following year, the quintet performed in Germany, Austria, France, Italy, Slovenia and Croatia. In addition to his own quartet, featuring Tardo Hammer (piano), Lee Hudson (bass) and Jimmy Wormworth (drums), the saxophonist performs with the Spirit of Life Ensemble in the U.S. and Europe.

Davis was a private saxophone instructor for students from The New School and a teacher at the Lucy Moses School. For over 25 years, he was an instructor at the Jazzmobile Workshops. Davis recorded eight albums, and was featured on over 100 recordings. Some of his CDs as a leader include Blue Gardenia, with Cedar Walton on piano, Peter Washington on bass and Joe Farnsworth on drums, on Reade Street Records; Land of Dreams, with Tardo Hammer, Lee Hudson and Jimmy Wormworth, released in 2007 on Smalls Records, and Our Man in Copenhagen (the music of Bent Jædig, released in October 2008 on Fresh Sound Records, with Sam Yahel, Ben Street, and Kresten Osgood. The Charles Davis Allstars: A Tribute to Kenny Dorham (with Tom Kirkpatrick on trumpet, Claus Raible on piano, Giorgos Antoniou on bass and Bernd Reiter on drums), recorded live at the Bird's Eye in Basel, Switzerland, was released in 2010.

He died in July 2016, and had a Catholic funeral at St Peter's in New York City.

== Discography ==
=== As leader ===
- 1974: Ingia! (Strata-East) with Ronnie Mathews, Louis Hayes, David Williams, Andrew "Tex" Allen, Gerald Hayes, Louis Davis
- 1979: Dedicated to Tadd (West 54)
- 1982: Super 80 (Nilva) with Walter Booker, Gene Adler, Michael Carvin
- 1990: Reflections (Red) with Barry Harris, Peter Washington, Ben Riley
- 2003: Blue Gardenia (Reade Street) with Cedar Walton, Peter Washington, Joe Farnsworth
- 2006: Plays the Music of Bent Jædig: Our Man in Copenhagen (Fresh Sound) with Sam Yahel, Ben Street, Kresten Osgood
- 2007: Land of Dreams (Smalls) with Tardo Hammer, Lee Hudson, Jimmy Wormworth
- 2010: A Tribute to Kenny Dorham (TCB) with Tom Kirkpatrick, Claus Raible, Giorgos Antoniou, Bernd Reiter
- 2014: For the Love of Lori (Reade Street) with Rick Germanson, Neal Smith, Joe Magnarelli, Steve Davis, David Williams

=== As sideman ===
Album	Label	Artist
Live in New York	Reservoir Music	Barry Harris
Anna's Dance	Reservoir Music	Roni Ben-Hur
Golden Boy	Colpix	Art Blakey and The Jazz Messengers
Down Here Below	Verve	Jeffery Smith
Bert’s Blues	Consolidated Artists CAP	Nancie Banks Orchestra
Ways of Peace	Consolidated Artists CAP	Nancie Banks Orchestra
Down Through the Years	Milestone	Clifford Jordan
Play What You Feel	Mapleshade	Clifford Jordan
Oasis	Muse	Shirley Scott
The Hearinga Suite	Black Saint	Muhal Richard Abrams
Ekaya	Ekapa	Abdullah Ibrahim
Water from an Ancient Well	Ekapa	Abdullah Ibrahim
Saxotic Stomp	Muse	Ricky Ford
Filet de Sole/Philly of Soul	Jazz Unite	Philly Joe Jones
To Tadd with Love	Uptown	Philly Joe Jones Dameronia
Look Stop Listen	Uptown	Philly Joe Jones Dameronia
Manhattan Project	Bee Hive	Dizzy Reece
Cedar Walton Plays	Delos	Cedar Walton
Mobius	RCA	Cedar Walton
Breakthrough!	Buddah	Cedar Walton/Hank Mobley
Breath of Life	Muse	Louis Hayes
Numatik Swing Band	JCOA	Roswell Rudd & the Jazz Composer's Orchestra
Haitian Bells		Alex Pascal
Live at Buddy’s Place	Vanguard	Clark Terry
Live at the Wichita Jazz Festival	Vanguard	Clark Terry
Illumination!	Impulse!	Elvin Jones/Jimmy Garrison
And Then Again	Atlantic	Elvin Jones
Jazz Contemporary	Time	Kenny Dorham
The Arrival of Kenny Dorham	Xanadu	Kenny Dorham
Doin' the Thang!	Prestige	Ronnie Mathews
Dinah Sings Fats Waller	EmArcy	Dinah Washington
Dinah Sings Bessie Smith	EmArcy	Dinah Washington
What a Diff'rence a Day Makes!	Mercury	Dinah Washington
Doodlin’	Emarcy	Eddie Chamblee
The Straight Horn of Steve Lacy	Candid	Steve Lacy
Jamaica Farewell	Argo	Ahmad Jamal
J.G. Big Band	Riverside	Johnny Griffin
Banded in Boston	Epic	Illinois Jacquet
Spiritsville	Jazzland	Julian Priester
Sweet Love, Bitter (soundtrack)	Impulse	Mal Waldron
The Soul Society	Riverside	Sam Jones
The Body & the Soul	Impulse!	Freddie Hubbard
Communications	JCOA	Jazz Composers Orchestra
Reggae au Go Go		Roy Burrowes
For Losers	Impulse!	Archie Shepp
Kwanza	Impulse!	Archie Shepp
The Way Ahead	Impulse!	Archie Shepp
Estimated Time of Arrival	Roulette	Bobby Watson
Sound Sun Pleasure!!		Sun Ra
Sun Ra and his Solar Arkestra Visits Planet Earth		Sun Ra
Jazz in Silhouette		Sun Ra
Super-Sonic Jazz		Sun Ra
Interstellar Low Ways		Sun Ra
New York City R&B		Cecil Taylor
Jumpin' Punkins		Cecil Taylor
Impact		Charles Tolliver
