= Jazz in Silhouette =

Studio album by Sun Ra and his Arkestra
- Released: May 1959
- Recorded: March 6, 1959
- Studio: El Saturn, Chicago
- Genre: Jazz
- Length: 44:09
- Label: Saturn, Impulse!, Evidence
- Producer: Alton Abraham

Sun Ra and his Arkestra chronology
Super-Sonic Jazz (1957)	Jazz in Silhouette (1959)	The Futuristic Sounds of Sun Ra (1962)

Sun Ra recording chronology
The Nubians of Plutonia (1959)	Jazz in Silhouette (1959)	Sound Sun Pleasure!! (1959)

Jazz in Silhouette is the third studio album by the pianist and composer Sun Ra. It was recorded on March 6, 1959, and released in May of the same year. The album was recorded in Chicago during a session that also included the whole of the albums Sound Sun Pleasure!! and "Interstellar Low Ways" from the album of the same name.

Critics have described the album as one of Ra's best from his relatively conventional early-career Chicago period before veering off into 'full-fledged explorations into the avant-garde' that characterises the recordings made in New York City in the 1960s.

== Background ==
Recorded in 1959 at El Saturn Studio, Chicago, the album is one of three records that the Arkestra released in the 1950s, the other two being Jazz by Sun Ra and Super-Sonic Jazz. Originally released in a simple silk-screened cover credited to HP Corbissero, the album had gained its sci-fi cover, 'of half-naked women teleporting themselves over one of the moons of Saturn', credited to 'Evans' by the early 1960s. The album's songs were featured in live performances by Sun Ra, and Enlightenment, in particular, was to become a staple of the Arkestra's concerts and often featured chanted vocals.

The album was reissued by Impulse in 1974, and released on CD by Evidence in 1992. When reissued by Impulse! on LP and Evidence on CD, the album's sides were reversed.

== Reception ==
Professional ratings
Review scores
Source	Rating
AllMusic	4/5 stars
DownBeat	2.5/5 stars
The Encyclopedia of Popular Music	5/5 stars
The Penguin Guide to Jazz	👑
Rolling Stone	4/5 stars

The Penguin Guide to Jazz selected this album as part of its suggested "Core Collection" and awarded it a "crown" accolade, stating "This marvellous record will one day be recognised as one of the most important jazz records since the war."

Jazz in Silhouette stands as an overlooked masterpiece, a work that shows Ra not as a mere curiosity or backwater galaxy, but as a major creative force in the jazz universe, a center of gravity around which many of jazz's major developments have orbited. This album simply inspires, no matter what perspective you adopt: rhythm, melody, ensemble or mood...Jazz in Silhouette shows Ra doing what he did like few others: looking at the past, present and future simultaneously while maintaining a unified musical direction...what results is a captivating set of music that not only firmly establishes Ra in the jazz tradition, but actually puts him on its leading edge, pointing the direction forward.
—All About Jazz

== Track listing ==
All tracks are written by Sun Ra except where noted.

Side One
No.	Title	Writer(s)	Length
1.	"Enlightenment"	Ra / Hobart Dotson	5:02
2.	"Saturn"		3:37
3.	"Velvet"		3:19
4.	"Ancient Aiethopia"		9:08
Total length:			21:06

Side Two
No.	Title	Writer(s)	Length
5.	"Hours After"	Ra / Everett Turner	3:04
6.	"Horoscope"		3:45
7.	"Images"		3:50
8.	"Blues At Midnight"		11:37
Total length:			22:16

=== Evidence: Compact Disc and Impulse!: 12" Vinyl ===
1. "Enlightenment" (Hobart Dotson, Ra) – (5:02)
2. "Saturn" – (3:37)
3. "Velvet" – (3:18)
4. "Ancient Aiethopia" – (9:04)
5. "Hours After" (Ra, Everett Turner) – (3:41)
6. "Horoscope" – (3:43)
7. "Images" – (3:48)
8. "Blues at Midnight" – (11:56)

For some years the record was believed to have been recorded in 1958, until the musicologist and discographer Robert Campbell uncovered the original tape box, clearly dated March 6, 1959. The album's release was mentioned a few months later in the Chicago Defender of June 9 (Sun Ra Discs Hit Album!).

== Musicians ==
- Sun Ra - Piano, celeste, gong
- Hobart Dotson - Trumpet
- Pat Patrick - Baritone sax, flute, percussion
- Charles Davis - Baritone sax, percussion
- John Gilmore - Tenor sax, percussion
- William Cochran - Drums
- Marshall Allen - Alto sax, flute
- James Spaulding - Alto sax, flute, percussion
- Ronnie Boykins - Bass
- Bo Bailey - Trombone
