= Brilliant Corners (James Spaulding album) =

Studio album by James Spaulding
- Released: 1990
- Recorded: November 25, 1988
- Studio: Van Gelder Studio, Englewood Cliffs, NJ
- Genre: Jazz
- Length: 45:25
- Label: Muse; MR 5369
- Producer: Don Sickler

James Spaulding chronology
Gotstabe a Better Way! (1988)	Brilliant Corners (1990)	Songs of Courage (1990)

Brilliant Corners is an album by saxophonist James Spaulding featuring compositions by, or associated with Thelonious Monk which was recorded in 1988 and released on the Muse label.

== Reception ==
Professional ratings
Review scores
Source	Rating
AllMusic	4.5/5 stars

The AllMusic review by Scott Yanow stated "James Spaulding is a very distinctive altoist and flutist whose inside/outside playing can cover anything from bop to freer improvisations. On what was surprisingly only his third recording as a leader, Spaulding is heard at the peak of his powers, leading a quartet/quintet ... this is his definitive recording".

== Track listing ==
All compositions by Thelonious Monk except where noted

1. "Brilliant Corners" – 6:15
2. "Let's Cool One" – 6:04
3. "Down With It" (Bud Powell) – 3:58
4. "Reflections" – 6:08
5. "I Mean You" (Coleman Hawkins, Thelonious Monk) – 5:41
6. "Ask Me Now" – 6:03
7. "Little Willie Leaps" (Miles Davis) – 5:16
8. "Little Rootie Tootie" – 6:00

== Personnel ==
- James Spaulding – alto saxophone, flute
- Wallace Roney – trumpet
- Mulgrew Miller – piano
- Ron Carter – bass
- Kenny Washington – drums
