= The Charm (T. S. Monk album) =

Studio album by T. S. Monk
- Released: 1995
- Recorded: 1995
- Studio: Ambient Recording Company, Stamford, Connecticut and River Sound, New York City
- Genre: Jazz
- Length: 56:12
- Label: Blue Note; CDP 7 89575 3 2
- Producer: Don Sickler, Thelonious Monk Jr.

T. S. Monk chronology
Changing of the Guard (1993)	The Charm (1995)	Monk on Monk (1997)

The Charm is an album by drummer T. S. Monk which was recorded in 1995 and released on the Blue Note label.

== Reception ==
Professional ratings
Review scores
Source	Rating
AllMusic	4.5/5 stars

The AllMusic review by Scott Yanow stated "T.S. Monk, by successfully keeping his sextet together as a regularly working outfit for several years, has been able to form a recognizable group sound in the hard bop tradition ... has no weak links and is one of the most consistently satisfying jazz groups from the mid-'90s. Their fine disc is easily recommended".

== Track listing ==
1. "Budini" (Buddy Montgomery) – 6:52
2. "The Dealer Takes Four" (Rodgers Grant) – 4:38
3. "Jean Marie" (Ronnie Mathews) – 6:32
4. "Marvelous Marvin" (Marty Sheller) – 4:37
5. "Bolivar Blues" (Thelonious Monk) – 8:53
6. "The Highest Mountain" (Clifford Jordan) – 8:00
7. "Rejuvenate" (Bobby Porcelli) – 5:07
8. "Just Waiting" (Melba Liston) – 5:49
9. "Gypsy Folk Tales" (Walter Davis Jr.) – 5:44

== Personnel ==
- T. S. Monk – drums
- Don Sickler – trumpet
- Bobby Porcelli – alto saxophone, flute
- Willie Williams – tenor saxophone, soprano saxophone, flute
- Ronnie Mathews – piano
- Scott Colley – bass
