= Take One (T. S. Monk album) =

Studio album by T. S. Monk
- Released: 1992
- Recorded: October 16, 1991
- Studio: Van Gelder, Englewood Cliffs, NJ
- Genre: Jazz
- Length: 66:39
- Label: Blue Note; CDP 7 99614 2
- Producer: Don Sickler, Thelonious Monk Jr.

T. S. Monk chronology
Human (1982)	Take One (1992)	Changing of the Guard (1993)

Take One is an album by the American musician T. S. Monk. It was released on the Blue Note label in 1992. Monk supported the album with a European tour.

== Production ==
The album was produced by Don Sickler and Thelonious Monk Jr.

== Reception ==
Professional ratings
Review scores
Source	Rating
AllMusic	4/5 stars
The Indianapolis Star	4/4 stars

The Ottawa Citizen deemed the album "a straightforward hard bop collection with compositions that come mostly from the mid-50s." The Indianapolis Star wrote that, "though the arrangements are based on originals recorded by his father's generation, this doesn't seem like a ghost-band venture."

The AllMusic review by Scott Yanow stated: "Drummer T.S. Monk's debut as a leader in jazz found him discarding his earlier R&B-ish music in favor of heading an impressive hard bop revival group ... The T.S. Monk Sextet was just beginning its long life with this recording; all of its CDs are highly recommended to hard bop fans".

== Track listing ==
1. "Monaco" (Kenny Dorham) – 6:34
2. "Skippy" (Thelonious Monk) – 3:40
3. "Infra-Rae" (Hank Mobley) – 6:07
4. "Waiting" (Idrees Sulieman) – 5:43
5. "Boa" (Elmo Hope) – 4:49
6. "Round Midnight" (Thelonious Monk) – 7:28
7. "Jodi" (Walter Davis Jr.) – 4:34
8. "Bear Cat" (Clifford Jordan) – 3:54
9. "Capetown Ambush" (Donald Brown) – 5:35
10. "Shoutin'" (Tommy Turrentine) – 6:14
11. "Minor's Holiday" (Dorham) – 5:22
12. "Think of One" (Thelonious Monk) – 6:39

== Personnel ==
- T. S. Monk – drums
- Don Sickler – trumpet
- Bobby Porcelli – alto saxophone
- Willie Williams – tenor saxophone
- Ronnie Mathews – piano
- James Genus – bass
