= Songs of Courage =

Studio album by James Spaulding
- Released: 1993
- Recorded: October 18, 1991
- Studio: Van Gelder Studio, Englewood Cliffs, NJ
- Genre: Jazz
- Length: 55:52
- Label: Muse; MCD 5382
- Producer: Don Sickler

James Spaulding chronology
Brilliant Corners (1988)	Songs of Courage (1993)	Blues Nexus (1999)

Songs of Courage is an album by saxophonist James Spaulding which was recorded in 1991 and released on the Muse label.

== Reception ==
Professional ratings
Review scores
Source	Rating
AllMusic	4/5 stars

The AllMusic review by Greg Turner stated "This is a fine recording by an underrecognized saxophone master".

== Track listing ==
All compositions by James Spaulding except where noted

1. "Cabu" (Roland Alexander) – 7:10
2. "Minor Bertha" (Elmo Hope) – 5:51
3. "Judy" (Alexander) – 5:49
4. "Autumn Leaves" (Joseph Kosma, Johnny Mercer, Jacques Prévert) – 6:54
5. "Wee" (Denzil Best) – 4:58
6. "Black Market" (Tyrone Jefferson) – 6:24
7. "Uhuru Sasa" – 4:29
8. "Song of Courage" – 6:12
9. "King" (Roland Alexander, Andrew Jenkins) – 8:05

== Personnel ==
- James Spaulding – alto saxophone, flute
- Roland Alexander – tenor saxophone (tracks 1, 2, 6 & 8)
- Tyrone Jefferson – trombone (tracks 1, 6 & 8)
- Kenny Barron – piano
- Ray Drummond – bass
- Louis Hayes – drums
