= The Smile of the Snake =

Studio album by James Spaulding
- Released: July 15, 1997
- Recorded: December 3 & 4, 1996
- Studio: Acoustic Sound Studios, Brooklyn, NY
- Genre: Jazz
- Length: 58:24
- Label: HighNote; HCD 7006
- Producer: Don Sickler

James Spaulding chronology
Blues Nexus (1993)	The Smile of the Snake (1997)	Escapade (2000)

The Smile of the Snake is a studio album by saxophonist James Spaulding which was recorded in December 1996 and released on the HighNote label the following year.

== Reception ==
Professional ratings
Review scores
Source	Rating
AllMusic	4.5/5 stars
The Penguin Guide to Jazz Recordings	3/4 stars

The AllMusic review by Scott Yanow stated, "One of the most underrated saxophonists of the post-1960 era, James Spaulding has long been a passionate postbop altoist and a warm flutist. On this superior outing he is heard in top form on both of his axes (plus two appearances on bass flute) ... the result is a high-quality set of obscurities ... Spaulding digs into the songs, displays a great deal of versatility and certainly has his fiery moments. One of James Spaulding's finest allround recordings".

For JazzTimes, Willard Jenkins wrote, "James Spaulding is a consistent multi-reed and flute exponent who always swings-in the true Indianapolis tradition where he was raised ... It is on alto saxophone where Spaulding has been making valuable contributions on the scene for over 30 years, yet his flute should not be overlooked in a time when jazz flute is in short supply. And dig his use of the rarely heard bass flute as an improvisational vehicle".

== Track listing ==
1. "Third Avenue" (Clifford Jordan) – 4:50
2. "Serenity" (Rodgers Grant) – 5:49
3. "The Smile of the Snake" (Donald Brown) – 6:05
4. "Lenora" (Richard Wyands) – 4:56
5. "Tonight Only" (Ron McClure) – 7:18
6. "Premonition" (Geoffrey Keezer) – 6:58
7. "Yes It Is" (Wyands) – 5:43
8. "Panchito" (McClure) – 5:06
9. "Love Is Not a Dream" (Idrees Sulieman, Kathe Laursen) – 5:48
10. "Havana Days (Cuba 1954)" (Brown) – 5:51

== Personnel ==
- James Spaulding – alto saxophone, flute, bass flute
- Richard Wyands – piano
- Ron McClure – bass
- Tony Reedus – drums
