= Roland Alexander =

American post-bop jazz musician

- Born: September 25, 1935; Boston, Massachusetts, U.S.
- Died: June 14, 2006 (aged 70) Brooklyn, New York, U.S.
- Genres: Jazz, post-bop
- Instruments: Tenor saxophone, soprano saxophone, piano

Roland Alexander (September 25, 1935 – June 14, 2006) was an American post-bop jazz musician.

== Early life ==
Born in Boston, Alexander grew up with his parents and sister, Gloria, in Cambridge, Massachusetts. He earned a bachelor's degree in music composition from the Boston Conservatory in 1958.

== Career ==
Alexander played tenor saxophone, soprano saxophone, and piano. He was a prolific composer and arranger who wrote and played for many of the better known bands in Boston during the 1950s, i.e. Sabby Lewis, Preston 'Sandy' Sandiford, Richie Lowery, Jaki Byard and many more. He co-led a group called the Boston All Stars that featured Trumpeter Joe Gordon, and after Joe Gordon left to play with Dizzy Gillespie's band Joe was replaced by a few of the more innovative trumpet soloists in the area, like Wajid Lateef (Crazy Wilbur Lucaw), and Gordon Wooly. He then moved to New York City in 1958. In addition to two solo releases, he played and recorded with John Coltrane, Howard McGhee, Max Roach, Sonny Rollins, Roy Haynes, Philly Joe Jones, Blue Mitchell, Sam Rivers, Archie Shepp, and Mal Waldron.

== Discography ==
=== As leader ===
- 1961: Pleasure Bent (Prestige) with Marcus Belgrave
- 1978: Live at the Axis (Kharma) with Malachi Thompson and Kalaparusha Maurice McIntyre

=== As sideman ===
With Paul Chambers

- High Step (Blue Note, 1956 [1975])

With Eddie Gale

- Black Rhythm Happening (Blue Note, 1969)

With Abdullah Ibrahim

- African Space Program (Enja, 1973)

With Howard McGhee

- Dusty Blue (Bethlehem, 1960)

With Charlie Persip

- Charles Persip and the Jazz Statesmen (Bethlehem, 1960)

With Max Roach

- Drums Unlimited (Atlantic, 1965)

With James Spaulding

- Songs of Courage (Muse, 1991 [1993])
