= Blues Nexus =

Studio album by James Spaulding
- Released: 1994
- Recorded: August 8, 1993
- Studio: Van Gelder Studio, Englewood Cliffs, NJ
- Genre: Jazz
- Length: 56:12
- Label: Muse; MCD 5467
- Producer: Don Sickler

James Spaulding chronology
Songs of Courage (1990)	Blues Nexus (1994)	The Smile of the Snake (1997)

Blues Nexus is an album by saxophonist James Spaulding which was recorded in 1993 and released on the Muse label.

== Reception ==
Professional ratings
Review scores
Source	Rating
AllMusic	4.5/5 stars

The AllMusic review by Greg Turner stated "James Spaulding is a very distinctive altoist and flutist whose inside/outside playing can cover anything from bop to freer improvisations. On what was surprisingly only his third recording as a leader, Spaulding is heard at the peak of his powers, leading a quartet/quintet ... this is his definitive recording".

== Track listing ==
1. "Hipsippy Blues" (Hank Mobley) – 4:41
2. "Gerkin for Perkins" (Clifford Brown) – 5:20
3. "John Charles" (Ronnie Mathews) – 5:00
4. "Rue Prevail" (Art Farmer) – 7:22
5. "Gypsy Blue" (Tina Brooks) – 5:35
6. "Vaun-Ex" (Elmo Hope) – 5:22
7. "Soul Station" (Mobley) – 7:46
8. "Chamber Mates" (Kenny Burrell, Paul Chambers) – 4:24
9. "Bleeker Street Blues" (Freddie Redd) – 5:54
10. "Public Eye" (Roy Hargrove) – 4:48

== Personnel ==
- James Spaulding – alto saxophone, flute, bass flute, piccolo
- Dan Faulk – tenor saxophone, soprano saxophone
- Ronnie Mathews – piano
- Ray Drummond – bass
- Louis Hayes – drums
- Don Sickler – flugelhorn (track 4)
