= Escapade (James Spaulding album) =

Studio album by James Spaulding
- Released: 2000
- Recorded: April 28, 1999
- Studio: Van Gelder Studio, Englewood Cliffs, NJ
- Genre: Jazz
- Length: 58:11
- Label: HighNote; HCD 7039
- Producer: Don Sickler

James Spaulding chronology
The Smile of the Snake (1997)	Escapade (2000)	Blues Up & Over (2001)

Escapade is an album by saxophonist James Spaulding which was recorded in 1999 and released on the HighNote label.

== Reception ==
Professional ratings
Review scores
Source	Rating
AllMusic	4/5 stars
The Penguin Guide to Jazz Recordings	3/4 stars

The AllMusic review by Michael G. Nastos stated "Spaulding's tart-sweet alto sax has never sounded better, while his pristine flute playing is easily in the top ten of late-'90s jazz performers. ... Spaulding shows a consistency within mainstream parameters, a real sense of teamwork with these worthy session mates, and a willingness to take chances".

== Track listing ==
1. "Escapade" (Kenny Dorham) – 5:55
2. "Cheese Cake" (Dexter Gordon) – 6:41
3. "Warm Valley" (Duke Ellington) – 5:16
4. "Madeline" (Hank Mobley) – 5:10
5. "Just One of Those Things" (Cole Porter) – 4:50
6. "Grant's Future" (Grant Green) – 6:36
7. "High Modes" (Mobley) – 6:47
8. "The Break Through" (Mobley) – 5:08
9. "It Could Happen to You" (Jimmy Van Heusen, Johnny Burke) – 5:27
10. "La Mesha" (Dorham) – 6:21

== Personnel ==
- James Spaulding – alto saxophone, flute, bass flute
- Don Sickler – trumpet, flugelhorn (tracks 1, 2, 6-8 & 10)
- John Hicks – piano
- Ray Drummond – bass
- Kenny Washington – drums
