= In Walked Thelonious =

Studio album by Walter Davis Jr.
- Recorded: 1987
- Genre: Jazz
- Label: Mapleshade

In Walked Thelonious is a solo piano album by Walter Davis Jr. It was recorded in 1987 and released by Mapleshade Records.

== Recording and music ==
The album of solo piano performances was recorded in 1987. The material was composed by Thelonious Monk. As preparation, Davis "immersed himself in fifty of Monk's toughest compositions for two months, deliberately leaving the choice of which to record until the moment he sat down at the studio Steinway."

== Release and reception ==
Professional ratings
Review scores
Source	Rating
AllMusic	4.5/5 stars
The Penguin Guide to Jazz	3/4 stars

In Walked Thelonious was released by Mapleshade Records. The AllMusic reviewer commented that Davis "consistently plays with creativity and a dose of the famous Monk wit". The Penguin Guide to Jazz wrote: "what is striking about his solo performances [...] is that they are more thoroughly personalized than most pianists dare."

== Track listing ==
1. "Green Chimneys" – 2:46
2. "Crepuscule with Nellie" – 2:39
3. "Gallop's Gallop" – 2:10
4. "Ask Me Now" – 3:08
5. "'Round Midnight, Pt. 1" – 4:48
6. "Trinkle Twinkle" – 2:10
7. "Ruby, My Dear" – 3:33
8. "Monk's Mood" – 2:54
9. "Off Minor" – 1:51
10. "Panonica" – 2:12
11. "Bye-Ya" – 1:31
12. "Ugly Beauty" – 2:35
13. "Criss Cross" – 2:33
14. "Portrait of an Ermite" – 1:54
15. "'Round Midnight, Pt. 2" – 5:20

== Personnel ==
- Walter Davis Jr. – piano
