= Changing of the Guard (T. S. Monk album) =

Studio album by T. S. Monk
- Released: 1993
- Recorded: February 8–13, 1993
- Studio: Power Station, NYC
- Genre: Jazz
- Length: 59:59
- Label: Blue Note; CDP 7 89050 2 8
- Producer: Don Sickler, Thelonious Monk Jr.

T. S. Monk chronology
Take One (1992)	Changing of the Guard (1993)	The Charm (1995)

Changing of the Guard is an album by the American drummer T. S. Monk, recorded in 1993 and released on the Blue Note label.

== Production ==
The album was recorded at Power Station and mixed at Electric Lady Studios. Most of the songs were arranged by Don Sickler. Monk included two songs written by his father, Thelonious.

== Reception ==
Professional ratings
Review scores
Source	Rating
AllMusic	4.5/5 stars
The Philadelphia Inquirer	4/4 stars

The AllMusic review by Scott Yanow stated: "Drummer T.S. Monk's sextet has quickly become one of the top repertory bands of hard bop ... there is no weak link to this excellent sextet. The band adds to rather than merely copies the tradition." The Washington Post deemed "Crepuscule with Nellie" "a complex, lesser known [Thelonious] Monk composition usually tackled by solo pianists; here the T.S. Monk sextet conveys the harmonics, the dynamics and the symphonic nature of the tune as Monk wrote it." The Toronto Star wrote that "the thrusting, unpretentious blowing session is most satisfying with alto Bobby Porcelli and trumpeter Don Sickler to the fore."

== Track listing ==
1. "Kelo" (J. J. Johnson) – 6:07
2. "Changing of the Guard" (James Williams) – 5:03
3. "Appointment in Milano" (Bobby Watson) – 5:43
4. "Monk's Dream" (Thelonious Monk) – 6:07
5. "Dark Before Dawn" (Artie Matthews) – 5:00
6. "Doublemint" (Idrees Sulieman) – 5:18
7. "Una Mas" (Kenny Dorham) – 5:03
8. "New York" (Donald Brown) – 6:13
9. "Crepuscule with Nellie" (Thelonious Monk) – 5:14
10. "K.D." (Bobby Porcelli) – 5:57
11. "Middle of the Block" (Clifford Jordan) – 4:14

== Personnel ==
- Thelonious Monk Jr – drums, wisdom and vision
- Don Sickler – trumpet
- Bobby Porcelli – alto saxophone
- Willie Williams – tenor saxophone
- Ronnie Mathews – piano
- Scott Colley – bass
