= Monk on Monk =

Studio album by T. S. Monk
- Released: 1997
- Recorded: February 6–27, 1997
- Studio: Van Gelder Studio, Englewood Cliffs, NJ
- Genre: Jazz
- Length: 52:35
- Label: N2K Encoded Music; N2KE-10017
- Producer: T. S. Monk

T. S. Monk chronology
The Charm (1995)	Monk on Monk (1997)	Crosstalk (1999)

Monk on Monk is an album by the drummer T. S. Monk, recorded in 1997 and released on the N2K label.

== Reception ==
Professional ratings
Review scores
Source	Rating
AllMusic	4.5/5 stars
The Penguin Guide to Jazz Recordings	4/4 stars

The AllMusic review by Scott Yanow stated: "To celebrate what would have been his father Thelonious Monk's 80th birthday, drummer T.S. Monk put together an all-star group (an expanded version of his sextet) and toured, performing an all-Thelonious program. Just prior to the beginning of the live performances, T.S. and his band recorded this CD. The music is excellent, but there are so many guest artists making cameo appearances that one never really gets to hear Monk's band very much ... this set is recommended. But one is left looking forward to hearing the actual T.S. Monk ensemble interpret the songs". On All About Jazz, Jack Bowers wrote: "Herein are nine of Monk’s matchless compositions, ably refashioned by T.S. and colleagues with an abundance of spirit and a scrupulous aversion to needless parody ... his is Monk with a contemporary flavor, and no less appetizing because of it".

== Track listing ==
All compositions by Thelonious Monk

1. "Little Rootie Tootie" – 7:34
2. "Crepuscule with Nellie" – 5:59
3. "Boo Boo's Birthday" – 5:25
4. "Dear Ruby" (lyrics by Sally Swisher) – 4:38
5. "Two Timer" – 6:27
6. "Bright Mississippi" – 4:42
7. "Suddenly" (lyrics by Jon Hendricks) – 5:29
8. "Ugly Beauty" – 6:12
9. "Jackie-ing" – 6:09

== Personnel ==
- T. S. Monk – drums
- Don Sickler – trumpet
- Eddie Bert – trombone (tracks 1–6, 8 & 9)
- Bobby Porcelli (tracks 1–7 & 9), Roger Rosenberg (tracks 1, 3–6, 8 & 9) – alto saxophone, baritone saxophone
- Willie Williams – soprano saxophone, tenor saxophone (tracks 1 & 3–9)
- Howard Johnson – baritone saxophone, tuba
- Ronnie Mathews – piano (tracks 2–4, 6, 7 & 9)
- Gary Wang – bass (tracks 4, 7 & 8)

=== Guest appearances ===
- Virgil Jones (tracks 1, 4 & 8), Laurie Frink (track 2), Arturo Sandoval (track 6), Wallace Roney (tracks 8 7 9), Clark Terry (track 7) – trumpet
- Roy Hargrove – flugelhorn (tracks 1 & 4)
- David Amram (tracks 3 & 9), John Clark (track 5) – French horn
- Wayne Shorter – soprano saxophone, tenor saxophone (track 2)
- Bobby Watson – alto saxophone (track 9)
- Jimmy Heath (track 6), Grover Washington Jr. (track 1) – tenor saxophone
- Geri Allen (track 8), Herbie Hancock (track 5), Danilo Pérez (track 1) – piano
- Ron Carter (tracks 1, 2 & 5), Dave Holland (tracks 3 & 9), Christian McBride (track 6) – bass
- Nnenna Freelon (track 7), Kevin Mahogany (track 4), Dianne Reeves (track 7) – vocals
