= To Tadd with Love =

Studio album by Philly Joe Jones Dameronia
- Released: 1982
- Recorded: June 28, 1982
- Studio: Nola Recording Studios, NYC
- Genre: Jazz
- Length: 41:15
- Label: Uptown; UP 27.11
- Producer: Mark Feldman, Robert E. Sunenblick MD.

Philly Joe Jones chronology
Filet de Sole/Philly of Soul (1981)	To Tadd with Love (1982)	Look Stop Listen (1983)

Dameronia chronology
To Tadd with Love (1982)	Look Stop Listen (1983)

To Tadd with Love is an album by drummer Philly Joe Jones' Dameronia which was recorded and released on the Uptown label in 1982.

== Reception ==
Professional ratings
Review scores
Source	Rating
AllMusic	4.5/5 stars
The Rolling Stone Album Guide	3/5 stars
The Virgin Encyclopedia of Jazz	3/5 stars

The album was nominated for Best Jazz Instrumental Performance, Group at the 26th Annual Grammy Awards.

The AllMusic review by Scott Yanow stated "Drummer Philly Joe Jones led the group Dameronia during his last years, a band dedicated to performing the music of the great composer Tadd Dameron. ... This loving tribute (which perfectly balances the arrangements with concise solo space) is highly recommended".

== Track listing ==
All compositions by Tadd Dameron

1. "Philly J. J." – 8:37
2. "Soultrane" – 5:22
3. "Sid's Delight" – 5:32
4. "On a Misty Night" – 9:27
5. "Fontainebleau" – 4:29
6. "The Scene Is Clean" – 7:48

== Personnel ==
- Philly Joe Jones – drums
- Don Sickler – trumpet, director
- Johnny Coles – trumpet
- Britt Woodman – trombone
- Frank Wess – alto saxophone
- Charles Davis – tenor saxophone
- Cecil Payne – baritone saxophone
- Walter Davis Jr. – piano
- Larry Ridley – double bass
