= Down Through the Years =

Live album by The Clifford Jordan Big Band
- Released: 1992
- Recorded: October 7, 1991
- Venue: Condon's, NYC
- Genre: Jazz
- Length: 59:05
- Label: Milestone MCD-9197-2
- Producer: Helen Keane

Clifford Jordan chronology
| Play What You Feel (1990) | Down Through the Years (1992) |

Down Through the Years is a live album by saxophonist Clifford Jordan's Big Band that was recorded in New York City in 1991 and released on the Milestone label in 1992.

== Reception ==
Professional ratings
Review scores
| Source | Rating |
|---|---|
| AllMusic | 4.5/5 stars |
| The Penguin Guide to Jazz Recordings | 4/4 stars |

The AllMusic review by Ken Dryden observed: "This 1991 big-band performance at Condon's in New York City also represents the final recording as a leader by Clifford Jordan, who died in 1993. In addition to Jordan's powerful and soulful tenor sax, trumpeters Dizzy Reece and Don Sickler, alto saxophonist Jerome Richardson, and pianist Ronnie Mathews are among the all-stars present on the date".

== Track listing ==
| No. | Title | Writer(s) | Length |
|---|---|---|---|
| 1. | "I Waited for You" | Dizzy Gillespie, Gil Fuller | 5:23 |
| 2. | "Highest Mountain" | Clifford Jordan | 4:56 |
| 3. | "Con Man" | Dizzy Reece | 9:04 |
| 4. | "Down Through the Years" | Jordan | 5:56 |
| 5. | "Don't Get Around Much Anymore" | Ellington, Bob Russell | 8:05 |
| 6. | "Status Quo" | John Neely | 7:24 |
| 7. | "Japanese Dream" | Jordan | 4:59 |
| 8. | "Third Avenue" | Jordan | 7:07 |
| 9. | "Charlie Parker's Last Supper" | Jordan | 6:50 |
| Total length: | | | 59:05 |

== Personnel ==
- Clifford Jordan – tenor saxophone, bandleader
- Stephen Furtado, Dean Pratt, Dizzy Reece, Don Sickler – trumpet
- Brad Shigeta – trombone
- Kiane Zawadi – euphonium
- Jerome Richardson, Sue Terry - alto saxophone
- Lou Orenstein, Willie Williams – tenor saxophone
- Charles Davis – baritone saxophone
- Ronnie Mathews – piano
- David Williams – bass
- Vernel Fournier – drums
