= Larry Ridley =

American jazz bassist and music educator

Laurence “Larry” Howard Ridley II (born September 3, 1937) is an American jazz bassist and music educator. He is an inductee of the Indianapolis Jazz Hall of Fame.

== Early life ==
Ridley was born on September 3, 1937, in Indianapolis, Indiana. Music became an important of his life since he was five years old. Ridley's mother would pay seventy-five cents for Ruth McArthur to give him violin lessons. McArthur had been renown in Indianapolis for helping push African Americans forward in the music community. She had opened a music school for those students who were being negatively impacted by segregation within the city's schools. This represented a chance to Ridley to open his eyes to the world of music and build a classical music background.

Ben Hollman, who was the father of Ridley's uncle's wife, introduced him to jazz and blues. Because this was the early stages when jazz was gaining more popularity within the United States, it was more important to gain an understanding of blues as that genre was heavily influencing jazz's development. Ridley also met and asked bassist Monk Montgomery for lessons.

After graduating from Shortridge High School in Indianapolis, he enrolled in 1955 in Indiana University. He was fortunate enough to earn a violin scholarship that would help cover his continued education at the school of music at the university. During his time there, Ridley had the opportunity to be a part of jazz groups and to play with the David Baker Band. When Ridley had enrolled in the university, it was rare for jazz to be a part of an institution's music program. In an interview, he stated that "the only thing that had been set up on sort of like a university type level was the Berklee College of Music, which was started in 1947." When he arrived at the university, he quickly realized that this institution could offer him countless opportunities to sharpen his skills. He was able to perform numerous times with the school's symphony orchestra and opera orchestra. Ridley was able to gain knowledge on different styles of music, but he still honed in on jazz. Along with a group of students, they would gather in the rehearsal halls to practice jazz. Ridley also met many musicians who came from the European classical tradition that played all around the world, and they would come to the university to teach classes.

== Career - Musician ==
In 1957, Ridley organized a jazz band that was called the Jazz Contemporaries. His fellow members were Freddie Hubbard, James Spaulding, Paul Parker, and Walter Miller. The group of musicians was underaged, but they were still able to perform six nights a week at George's Bar. In the early 1960s, Ridley relocated to New York to pursue a musical career in jazz. He became extremely involved in the New York jazz scene in an attempt to help it grow. During that decade, he appeared on records with Hubbard, Roy Haynes, Horace Silver, Hank Mobley, Lee Morgan, Jackie McLean, and Dexter Gordon. During the 1970s, he was able to record his first album where he was the bandleader this time. In addition, Ridley was a part of meaningful collaborations as a sideman for James Moody and Duke Ellington. He became the bassist for Thelonious Monk as well.

During his career as a musician, the performances he has held closest to his heart were his yearly concerts at the Schomburg Center for Research in Black Culture in New York City. These concerts were tributes to three pianists he played with throughout his career: Duke Pearson, Sonny Clark, and Kenny Drew. Because all three had already died, he felt that it was the least he could do for them since they had no presence in the commercial scene anymore. He credits "the creator" with having given him the opportunity to get to know these people and learn from all of them about he could grow both as a person and a musician. As a result, Ridley felt that holding these tribute concerts was something that he was moved to do to make sure they never fade away and become anonymous musicians.

Furthermore, the Schomburg Center was a special institution for Ridley. He held it in very high regard as it was one of "the world's leading institutions as far as the type of information they have that relates to African or black culture." To him, it is one of the best displays of "intellectual and artistic artifacts". As a way of showing respect to the invaluable institution that the Schomburg Center had become, Ridley would try to mix education with his performances. When he would design the programs for his concerts, he would make notes giving overviews of the musicians he would be honoring throughout his performance.

== Career - Educator ==
As previously mentioned, music education was of utmost importance during his development. In 1971 he became a professor of music at Rutgers. He became extremely involved with the Rutgers Institute for Jazz Studies to help make it as important of a repository for intellect and history like the Schomburg Center. He was one of the first active, African American musicians who became involved in the education aspect of the industry. Ridley, in addition, was a founding member of the jazz faculty at Rutgers. He brought in to the program a multitude of jazz musicians: Ted Dunbar, Kenny Barron, Don Friedman, Jimmy Giuffre, Freddie Waits, Michael Carvin, Frank Foster, and more. Again, his source of inspiration behind aiding in establishing this institution at the university was that jazz programs were not popular back when he was in school. In addition, Ridley had seen ads for institutions with "jazz degrees" that said you had the opportunity to study with the greatest jazz musicians, but he said he would never recognize any of the names on there. As a result, he ensured to bring to Rutgers established and known musicians who could share professional and personal insight with all aspiring musicians. Another shortcoming of other attempts to establish a jazz degree was that they failed to incorporate the spiritual aesthetic of jazz, which Ridley viewed as "the feeling of the music that comes from Mother Africa through the whole African American experience." To him, a critical part of true jazz was having soul and spirituality in every song you performed. He viewed jazz as a platform to showcase to the world what life was like as an African American trying to live out the American dream, an idea that many musicians could relate to.

Ridley had the credentials to undertake the formation of the undergraduate and graduate jazz performance programs at Rutgers. Even though he had enrolled initially at Indiana University, he transferred to New York University to obtain his Bachelor's in Music Education. He also earned his Master's in Cultural Policy at Empire State College and a Doctor of Performing Arts degree at the University of Maryland Eastern Shore. What inspired him though to get his Bachelor's in music education was that he felt that jazz needed a program similar to the general music education. He believed that the music academy "was not going to ever accept jazz a legitimate art form or music because there was always this thing about, 'Oh do you play legit?' or 'Do you play serious music?'".

"I always told students, take your ego and put it in your back pocket and sit on it and just keep your humbleness so you really understand and that you keep learning."

== Influence - African American Jazz Caucus ==
Ridley was the primary founder in 1977 for the Black Jazz Music Caucus of the National Association of Jazz Educators, which now operates under the African American Jazz Caucus (AAJC), where he later served as the executive director. The purpose of having established this caucus was to increase the "representation of African American Jazz artists and educators within the larger body of the Jazz Educators Association."

One of the early goals of the African American Jazz Caucus was to give support and resources to both African American artists and educators at elementary, secondary, and higher educational institutions. In addition, Ridley would help organize workshops and performances at conferences for the National Association of Jazz Educators. Like he did when he established the jazz faculty at Rutgers, he would invite renowned African American artists in an attempt to provide reliable mentorship opportunities for aspiring musicians and educators. The AAJC constantly tried to tackle any challenges that members can face when it comes to educating students. Some of these challenges included the "creation of employment opportunities, the sustenance and protection of employment and programming, the allocation of adequate resources, and, the creation and monitoring of curricula that rightfully acknowledge and position the history and contributions of African Americans as the progenitors of the Jazz art form."

Furthermore, Ridley and the AAJC ensured that jazz educators across the country recognized and acknowledged, to this day, the African American cultural influences upon which jazz was built around. He wanted educators to understand all ways that African Americans contributed to jazz's development in the United States: spirituality, individuality, diversity, improvisation, and theory, to name a few.

== Discography ==
=== As leader ===
- 1975: Sum of the Parts (Strata-East)
- 1989: Live at Rutgers University (Strata-East)

=== As sideman ===
With Chet Baker

- Chet Baker Quartet/Live in France 1978, one track only, (Gambit Records, 2005)

With Bill Barron

- Hot Line (Savoy, 1962 [1964])

With Kenny Burrell

- Groovin' High (Muse, 1981 [1984])

With Al Cohn

- Play It Now (Xanadu, 1975)

With Dameronia

- To Tadd with Love (Uptown, 1982)
- Look Stop Listen (Uptown, 1983)
- Live at the Theatre Boulogne-Billancourt Paris (Soul Note, 1989 [1994])

With Teddy Edwards

- The Inimitable Teddy Edwards (Xanadu, 1976)

With Red Garland

- The Nearness of You (Jazzland, 1961)

With Dexter Gordon

- The Panther! (Prestige, 1970)

With Stéphane Grappelli and Joe Venuti

- Venupelli Blues (Affinity, 1969)

'With Bunky Green

- My Babe (Vee-Jay, 1960 [1965])

With Slide Hampton

- Somethin' Sanctified (Atlantic, 1960)

With Roy Haynes

- Cracklin' (New Jazz, 1963)
- Cymbalism (New Jazz, 1963)

With Freddie Hubbard

- Hub Cap (Blue Note, 1961)
- Blue Spirits (Blue Note, 1965)
- The Night of the Cookers (Blue Note, 1965)

With Jackie McLean

- Destination... Out! (Blue Note, 1963)
- Jacknife (Blue Note, 1965)

With Hank Mobley

- Dippin' (Blue Note, 1965)
- Straight No Filter (Blue Note, 1989)

With James Moody

- Feelin' It Together (Muse, 1973)

With Wes Montgomery and Wynton Kelly

- Maximum Swing: The Unissued 1965 Half Note Recordings (Resonance, 1965)

With Lee Morgan

- Cornbread (Blue Note, 1965)

With Horace Silver

- The Jody Grind (Blue Note, 1966)

With Lucky Thompson

- Goodbye Yesterday (Groove Merchant, 1973)

With Gerald Wilson

- New York, New Sound (Mack Avenue, 2003)
