= Pleasure Bent =

Studio album by Roland Alexander with Marcus Belgrave
- Released: 1961
- Recorded: June 17, 1961
- Studio: Van Gelder Studio, Englewood Cliffs, NJ
- Genre: Jazz
- Length: 41:20
- Label: New Jazz; NJ 8267
- Producer: Ozzie Cadena

Roland Alexander chronology
Pleasure Bent (1961)	Live at the Axis (1978)

Marcus Belgrave chronology
Pleasure Bent (1961)	Gemini II (1974)

Pleasure Bent is a debut album by saxophonist Roland Alexander, with trumpeter Marcus Belgrave, recorded in 1961, and released on the New Jazz label.

== Reception ==
Professional ratings
Review scores
Source	Rating
AllMusic	3/5 stars

The AllMusic review by Alex Henderson stated, "Although the tenor saxman's Coltrane-influenced debut album, Pleasure Bent, was recorded in 1961, this vinyl LP has more in common with the bop-oriented Coltrane of the mid- to late '50s. ... That isn't to say that Alexander is a flat-out clone of Coltrane -- he was also influenced by Sonny Rollins and other hard boppers -- but there is no denying that Coltrane's playing is a strong influence on this record ... his roots were hard bop, and hard bop is exactly what he plays on this decent, if derivative, LP."

== Track listing ==
All compositions by Roland Alexander except where noted

1. "Pleasure Bent" – 11:10
2. "I'll Be Around" (Alec Wilder) – 5:20
3. "Dorman Road" – 5:30
4. "Lil's Blues" – 7:20
5. "Orders to Take Out" – 7:00
6. "My Melancholy Baby" (Ernie Burnett, George Norton) – 5:00

== Personnel ==
- Roland Alexander – tenor saxophone
- Marcus Belgrave – trumpet
- Ronnie Mathews – piano
- Gene Taylor – bass
- Clarence "Scoby" Stroman – drums
