= Design in Time =

Studio album by Ken Vandermark
- Released: 1999
- Recorded: July 6 & 7, 1999
- Studios: Airwave, Chicago
- Genre: Jazz
- Length: 69:50
- Label: Delmark
- Producer: Sound in Action Trio

Ken Vandermark chronology
Live at the Glenn Miller Café (1999)	Design in Time (1999)	Expansion Slang (2000)

Design in Time is an album by American jazz reedist Ken Vandermark, which was recorded in 1999 and released on Delmark. It was the debut recording by the Sound in Action Trio, which features two drummers: former Sun Ra percussionist Robert Barry and frequent Vandermark collaborator Tim Mulvenna. Most of the tunes are classics written by Ornette Coleman, Thelonious Monk, Sun Ra, Don Cherry and Albert Ayler.

== Reception ==
Professional ratings
Review scores
Source	Rating
AllMusic	4/5 stars
The Penguin Guide to Jazz	3.5/4 stars

In her review for AllMusic, Joslyn Layne states "Design in Time is a very strong jazz release that becomes more wowing and impressive with each listen."

The Penguin Guide to Jazz says "Barry and Mulvenna make an unapologetically swinging team, playing at least as much time as they do free, and with Coleman, Monk and Ayler among the composer-credits, this is an amenable place to acquaint a newcomer with Vandermark's methods."

The JazzTimes review by Bill Shoemaker notes that "If playing solo is, as often stated, like working a high-wire without a net, venturing out with arrangements for a single horn and two drummers adds a bed of spikes to the simile."

In his review for All About Jazz, Derek Taylor states "Given the solid rhythmic foundry the two afford him, Vandermark is free to cut loose at will on both tenor and clarinet, but unexpectedly he often opts on the side of restraint. His decision is a shrewd move and rightly places the textural emphasis on the intricate interplay between all three players, particularly the drummers."

The PopMatters review by Imre Szeman says "Vandermark tones it down somewhat, opting for a more melodic and even introspective approach, while still maintaining a high degree of energy and movement. The results are impressive: this is a flat out stellar jazz album, even though it may well come to occupy only a minor place in Vandermark’s already considerable ouevre."

== Track listing ==
All compositions by Ken Vandermark except as indicated

1. "Law Years" (Ornette Coleman) – 8:21
2. "Sounds and Something Else" (Sun Ra) – 6:10
3. "One More Once" – 6:02
4. "Well Suited" – 7:17
5. "Cut to Fit" – 5:09
6. "Angels" (Albert Ayler) – 7:04
7. "Feet Music" (Ornette Coleman) – 6:32
8. "The Thing" (Don Cherry) – 5:25
9. "Top Shelf" – 5:30
10. "Green Chimneys" (Thelonious Monk) – 6:07
11. "Peace" (Ornette Coleman) – 6:13

== Personnel ==
- Ken Vandermark – tenor sax, clarinet
- Robert Barry – drums
- Tim Mulvenna – drums
