= Louis Hayes (album) =

Studio album by Louis Hayes
- Released: 1960
- Recorded: April 26, 1960
- Studio: New York City, NY
- Genre: Jazz
- Length: 36:35 original LP; 64:47 CD reissue with bonus tracks
- Label: Vee-Jay; VJLP 3010
- Producer: Sid McCoy

Louis Hayes chronology
Louis Hayes (1960)	Breath of Life (1974)

Louis Hayes (also called Louis Hayes with Nat Adderley and Yusef Lateef) is the debut album by American jazz drummer Louis Hayes recorded in 1960 for Vee-Jay Records. The personnel includes the Cannonball Adderley's 1960 Quintet with Yusef Lateef in place of the leader. The album was also re-released in 1974 under Lateef's name as Contemplation.

== Reception ==
Professional ratings
Review scores
Source	Rating
AllMusic	4.5/5 stars

Scott Yanow of AllMusic states "Although one misses the fiery altoist, the contrast between Nat's exciting (if sometimes erratic) cornet and Yusef's dignified yet soulful tenor make this an above-average session of swinging bop".

== Track listing ==
1. "Hazing" (Yusef Lateef) - 3:33
2. "Rip de Boom" (Cannonball Adderley) - 5:16
3. "Teef" (Sylvester Kyner) - 9:47
4. "I Need You" (Barry Harris) - 7:36
5. "Back Yard" (Harris) - 5:48
6. "Sassy Ann" (Nat Adderley) - 4:24
7. "Hazing" [Take 1] (Lateef) - 3:42 Bonus track on CD reissue
8. "Rip de Boom" [Take 1] (Cannonball Adderley) - 5:18 Bonus track on CD reissue
9. "Teef" [Take 1] (Kyner) - 7:44 Bonus track on CD reissue
10. "I Need You" [Take 1] (Harris) - 7:44 Bonus track on CD reissue
11. "Sassy Ann" [Take 5] (Nat Adderley) - 3:55 Bonus track on CD reissue

== Personnel ==
- Louis Hayes – drums
- Yusef Lateef - tenor saxophone
- Nat Adderley - cornet
- Barry Harris - piano
- Sam Jones - bass
