= Bon Bon Vie (Gimme the Good Life) =

Single by T. S. Monk

from the album House of Music
- B-side: "Stay Free of His Love"
- Released: August 1980
- Recorded: 1979
- Genre: Funk, jazz, post-disco
- Length: 3:35
- Label: Mirage
- Songwriters: L. Russell Brown, Sandy Linzer
- Producer: Sandy Linzer

T. S. Monk singles chronology
"Bon Bon Vie (Gimme the Good Life)" (1980)	"Candidate for Love" (1980)

"Bon Bon Vie (Gimme the Good Life)" is a single by American band T. S. Monk, released in August 1980 on Mirage Records. It was arranged by band leader Thelonious Monk, Jr. and written by songwriter L. Russell Brown and producer Sandy Linzer. The song has a rhythmic style and lyrics about aspiring to a rich lifestyle.

The song was released in promotion of the band's 1980 debut album House of Music. It was T. S. Monk's best-selling song and only charting single on the Billboard Hot 100, peaking at number 63. "Bon Bon Vie", particularly its horn intro, has been sampled by several hip hop artists.

== Music and lyrics ==
"Bon Bon Vie (Gimme the Good Life)"
30-second sample of the song

According to Barry Lederer from Billboard, "Bon Bon Vie" is a midtempo funk/jazz song with a brassy beat. It has also been defined as a record of post-disco. T. S. Monk's bandleader Thelonious Monk, Jr., served as arranger, drummer, and lead vocalist for the song. It was co-written by Sandy Linzer, who produced its album House of Music. The song's lyrics are about aspiring to a rich lifestyle. Its chorus chants, "Give us the bon / give us the bon bon bon bon vie / give us the good life."

The song opens with a notable horn intro. The song's rough rhythmic style counterpoints its smooth harmonies. It also features lighthearted vocals, haunting scat riffs, and a backbeat constituted by brass, bongo, and hand-clapping.

== Release and reception ==
After "Bon Bon Vie" was released, it charted at number 63 on the Billboard Hot 100 on March 28, 1981. It also reached number 11 on the Billboard Hot Soul Singles. On the Hot Dance/Disco Songs, the song peaked at number 13. It proved to be T. S. Monk's only entry on both the pop and dance charts, as well as their best-selling song. In the United Kingdom, "Bon Bon Vie" reached number 63 and spent two weeks on the UK Singles Chart. It also charted at number 21 in the Netherlands.

In a review of House of Music, Stereo Review magazine's Irv Cohn said "Bon Bon Vie" is an "interesting" song that proves "real musicians are at work in dance music in the post-disco era." The Black Music & Jazz Review was not impressed by the album, but enjoyed the single and its B-side "a lot", as well as T. S. Monk's subsequent single "Candidate for Love". Stephen Holden from The New York Times wrote that producer Sandy Linzer "has found for T.S. Monk a flexible, melodic style that is halfway between Chic's disco and Dr. Buzzard's swing." In The Village Voice, Robert Christgau praised "Bon Bon Vie" as "a rich song about aspiring to the rich life" and wrote, "I love not only the subtle Sandy Linzer lyric but also Thelonious Monk Jr.'s rough, high-humored vocal and incisive drumming, and its arrangement keeps giving up new pleasures." He also took note of its musical aesthetic, calling it "ebullient on top and this far from desperation underneath". Christgau named it the second-best song of the 1980s in a decade-end list for The Village Voice.

== Legacy ==
According to Thelonious Monk biographist Robin Kelley, with the song's success, band members Thelonious Jr. and Boo Boo Monk "had finally fulfilled their father's elusive dream—to get a 'hit'". "Bon Bon Vie" was sampled by rapper Jaz-O for his 1989 song "Pumpin'", featuring Jay-Z. The song's horn intro was sampled by hip hop group Public Enemy for the song "Welcome to the Terrordome" from their album Fear of a Black Planet. The horn intro was also sampled by Above the Law on their 1993 song "G's & Macoronies", by R&B group Blackstreet on their 1994 song "Good Life", and by rapper Raekwon on his 2009 song "Stick Up Music". "Bon Bon Vie" was remixed by Paul Simpson in 2010.

== Track listing ==
- US 7" single

A. "Bon Bon Vie (Gimme the Good Life)" (Lawrence Russell Brown, Sandy Linzer) – 3:35
B. "Stay Free of His Love" (Linzer, Steve Wise) – 4:10

- US 12" single

A. "Bon Bon Vie (Gimme the Good Life)" – 5:12
B. "Bon Bon Vie (Gimme the Good Life)" – 5:12

- UK 12" single

A. "Bon Bon Vie" – 5:12
B. "Stay Free of His Love" – 4:10

- France, Italy 7" single

A. "Bon Bon Vie (Gimme the Good Life)" – 5:04
B. "Stay Free of His Love" – 4:10

- Netherlands 7" single

A. "Bon Bon Vie" – 3:40
B. "Stay Free of His Love" – 4:13

- Netherlands 12" maxi-single

A. "Bon Bon Vie" – 3:40
B. "Stay Free of His Love" – 4:13

== Personnel ==
Credits adapted from House of Music liner notes.

- Cliff Anderson – horns
- Russell Blake – bass
- Lawrence Russell Brown – composer
- Floyd Fisher – keyboards, synthesiser
- Yvonne Fletcher – vocals
- Sandy Linzer – composer, producer
- Boo Boo Monk – vocals
- Thelonious Monk, Jr. – arrangements, drums, horns, vocals
- Jeff Sigman – guitar
- Ronnie Taylor – horns
- Courtney Wynter – horns
- Victor See Yuen – percussion

== Charts ==
Chart (1981)	Peak position
Netherlands (Nationale Hitparade)	21
UK Singles (BMRB)	63
US Billboard Hot 100	63
US Hot Dance/Disco Songs (Billboard)	11
US Hot Soul Singles (Billboard)	11

== See also ==
- List of post-disco artists and songs
