= Super-Sonic Jazz =

Studio album by Sun Ra and his Arkestra
- Released: March 1957
- Recorded: April 13 – October 1956, Chicago
- Genre: Jazz
- Length: 49:31
- Label: Saturn; Impulse! Evidence
- Producer: Alton Abraham

Sun Ra and his Arkestra chronology
Jazz by Sun Ra (1957)	Super-Sonic Jazz (1957)	Jazz in Silhouette (1959)

Sun Ra recording chronology
Jazz by Sun Ra (1956)	Super-Sonic Jazz (1956)	Sound of Joy (1956)

Reissue cover
- Impulse reissue, 1974

Professional ratings
Review scores
Source	Rating
AllMusic	3/5 stars
The Penguin Guide to Jazz Recordings	3.5/4 stars
Rolling Stone	5/5 stars

Super-Sonic Jazz is the second studio album by Sun Ra, recorded in 1956 at RCA Studios, Chicago. Super-Sonic Jazz was the first album to be released on Saturn Records, the label run by Sun Ra and Alton Abraham, and was one of only three albums by Sun Ra to have been available in the 1950s. (The other two are Jazz by Sun Ra, also released in 1957, and Jazz in Silhouette, released May 1959.)

The album was retitled as Super-Sonic Sounds when it was reissued in 1974 by Impulse!, but reverted to its original title when it was released on CD by Evidence records in 1992.

== Background ==
=== El Saturn Records ===
Super-Sonic Jazz was the first album to be released on El Saturn Records, the label run by Sun Ra and his business partner Alton Abraham. Set up in 1955, they released their first singles, including a doo-wop group The Cosmic Rays and the Arkestra's Saturn, at the beginning of 1956, and had recorded the whole of their first album by the end of the year, to be released in March 1957. El Saturn is now considered, along with Charles Mingus and Max Roach’s Debut label and Harry Partch’s Gate 5 label, "one of the very first and most active artist-owned record labels." Often pressed in editions of 75 — sometimes as few as 20 were made for specific concerts — the records would be manufactured using local black businesses, and often put together in Abraham's own home. As John F. Szwed described,

El Saturn Records purchased no advertising, gave out no promotional copies for review, and no distribution channels except mail order, hand delivery to the record shops, and, in the southern tradition, sales from the bandstand after performances. An order to the El Saturn address might or might not get a response, and when a record came it might be a different one than ordered (a 1971 Saturn price list asked orderers to list five alternatives), or arrive months later.

=== Recording ===
The album was primarily recorded between September and October 1956, with a handful of tracks recorded prior to the Jazz by Sun Ra sessions used to fill out the album.

== Track listing ==
All tracks are written by Sun Ra except where noted. All tracks recorded from September - October 1956 except where noted.

Side one
No.	Title	Writer(s)	Recording Date	Length
1.	"India"			4:47
2.	"Sunology"			5:39
3.	"Advice to Medics"		June 16, 1956	2:01
4.	"Super Blonde"		June 16, 1956	2:31
5.	"Soft Talk"	Julian Priester	June 16, 1956	2:40
6.	"Sunology, Part II"			7:03
Total length:				24:41

Side two
No.	Title	Recording Date	Length
7.	"Kingdom of Not"		5:26
8.	"Portrait of the Living Sky"		1:48
9.	"Blues at Midnight"		6:30
10.	"El Is a Sound of Joy"		3:55
11.	"Springtime in Chicago"	April 13, 1956	3:50
12.	"Medicine for a Nightmare"	June 16, 1956	2:23
Total length:			23:52

== Musicians ==
The Arkestra in an unidentified club, late 1955 or 1956; l-r, Sun Ra, Richard Evans, Robert Barry, John Gilmore & Pat Patrick

- Sun Ra – Piano, Electric Piano, Space Gong on all tracks except 'Springtime in Chicago'
- Art Hoyle – Trumpet, Percussion on all tracks except 'Super Blonde', 'Soft Talk', 'Medicine for a Nightmare', and 'Advice to Medics'
- Pat Patrick – Alto Sax on all tracks except 'Springtime in Chicago,' 'Super Blonde', 'Soft Talk', 'Medicine for a Nightmare', and 'Advice to Medics', Percussion on all tracks except 'Super Blonde', 'Soft Talk', 'Medicine for a Nightmare', and 'Advice to Medics',
- John Gilmore – Tenor Sax on all tracks except 'Springtime in Chicago', Percussion on all tracks except 'Soft Talk', 'Medicine for a Nightmare', and 'Advice to Medics'
- Charles Davis – Baritone Sax & Percussion on all tracks except 'Springtime in Chicago', 'Super Blonde', 'Soft Talk', 'Medicine for a Nightmare', and 'Advice to Medics'
- Victor Sproles – Bass on all tracks except 'Springtime in Chicago', 'Super Blonde', 'Soft Talk', 'Medicine for a Nightmare', and 'Advice to Medics'
- William Cochran – Drums on all tracks except 'Springtime in Chicago', 'Super Blonde', 'Soft Talk', 'Medicine for a Nightmare', and 'Advice to Medics'
- Jim Herndon – Tympani & Percussion on tracks except 'Springtime in Chicago'

=== Guests ===
- Julian Priester – Trombone on 'Springtime in Chicago,' 'Super Blonde', 'Soft Talk', 'Medicine for a Nightmare', and 'Advice to Medics'
- Wilburn Green – Electric Bass on 'Springtime in Chicago,' 'Super Blonde', 'Soft Talk', 'Medicine for a Nightmare', and 'Advice to Medics'
- Robert Barry – Drums on 'Springtime in Chicago,' 'Super Blonde', 'Soft Talk', 'Medicine for a Nightmare', and 'Advice to Medics'
- James Scales – Alto Sax & Percussion on 'Springtime in Chicago'

Mixed at RCA studios, Chicago, February 14, 1957, and released in March with an initial pressing of 500.
