= Sound Sun Pleasure!! =

Studio album by Sun Ra and his Astro Infinity Arkestra
- Released: 1970
- Recorded: March 6, 1959, Chicago
- Genre: Jazz
- Length: 24:53
- Label: Saturn; Evidence
- Producer: Alton Abraham

Sun Ra and his Astro Infinity Arkestra chronology
Jazz in Silhouette (1959)	Sound Sun Pleasure!! (1970)	Interstellar Low Ways (1959-60)

Professional ratings
Review scores
Source	Rating
AllMusic	4/5 stars
The Penguin Guide to Jazz Recordings	3.5/4 stars
Rolling Stone	3.5/5 stars

Sound Sun Pleasure!! is an album by the American jazz musician Sun Ra and his Astro Infinity Arkestra. Recorded March 6, 1959, it remained unreleased until 1970 when it was issued on the Saturn label. Recorded at the same time and with the same personnel as Jazz in Silhouette, the album is unusual amongst early Ra albums for predominantly featuring jazz standards.

The album has been reissued on CD by the Evidence label with 7 tracks taken from the 1973 Saturn album Deep Purple recorded between 1953 and 1957.

== Track listing ==
=== 12" Vinyl ===
Side A:

1. "'Round Midnight" (Hanighen, Monk, Williams) - (3.55)
2. "You Never Told Me That You Care" (Hobart Dotson) - (5.37)
3. "Hour of Parting" (Schiffer, Spoliansky) - (4.53)

Side B:

1. "Back in Your Own Backyard" (Jolson, Rose, Dreyer) - (2.07)
2. "Enlightenment (taken from Jazz in Silhouette)" (Dotson, Ra) - (5.09)
3. "I Could Have Danced All Night" (Lerner, Loewe) - (3.11)

== Musicians ==
- Sun Ra - piano, celeste, gong
- Hobart Dotson - trumpet
- Marshall Allen - alto sax, flute
- James Spaulding - alto sax, flute, percussion
- John Gilmore - tenor sax, percussion
- Bo Bailey - Trombone
- Pat Patrick - baritone sax, flute, Percussion
- Charles Davis - baritone sax, percussion
- Ronnie Boykins - bass
- William Cochran - drums
- Hattie Randolph - vocals
