= Tribute to George Adams =

Studio album by New York Unit
- Released: 1993
- Recorded: December 16, 1991, June 15, November 17, 1992
- Studio: Music Inn, Tokyo; Sear Sound, New York City
- Genre: Jazz
- Label: Paddle Wheel

John Hicks chronology
| St. Thomas: Tribute to Great Tenors (1991) | Tribute to George Adams (1991–92) | Friends Old and New (1992) |

Tribute to George Adams is an album by New York Unit, consisting of pianist John Hicks, drummer Tatsuya Nakamura, bassists Santi Debriano or Richard Davis, and a variety of tenor saxophonists, including George Adams himself. It was recorded in 1991 and 1992.

== Recording and music ==
"Georgia on My Mind" was recorded at Music Inn in Tokyo on December 16, 1991; the musicians were George Adams (tenor sax), John Hicks (piano), Richard Davis (bass), and Tatsuya Nakamura (drums). The next session was at Sear Sound, New York City, on June 15, 1992, with Dan Faulk (tenor sax), Hicks, Davis, and Nakamura. The final session was also at Sear Sound, on November 17, 1992, with Javon Jackson (tenor sax), Hicks, Santi Debriano (bass), and Nakamura.

== Release ==
Tribute to George Adams was released by Paddle Wheel Records.

== Track listing ==
1. "Exodus"
2. "A Nightingale Sang in Berkeley Square"
3. "Fly Me to the Moon"
4. "Moritat"
5. "Straight, No Chaser"
6. "Moment's Notice"
7. "Gospel Blues"
8. "When Something Is Wrong with My Baby"
9. "Mr P. C."
10. "Georgia on My Mind"

== Personnel ==
- Javon Jackson – tenor sax (tracks 1, 2, 4–7)
- Dan Faulk – tenor sax (tracks 8, 9)
- George Adams – tenor sax (track 10)
- John Hicks – piano
- Santi Debriano – bass (tracks 1–7)
- Richard Davis – bass (tracks 8–10)
- Tatsuya Nakamura – drums
