= Live at the Theatre Boulogne-Billancourt Paris =

Live album by Dameronia
- Released: 1994
- Recorded: May 30, 1989
- Venue: Theatre Boulogne-Billancourt, Boulogne-Billancourt, France
- Genre: Jazz
- Length: 1:02:21
- Label: Soul Note; 121 202-2
- Producer: Giovanni Bonandrini

Dameronia chronology
Look Stop Listen (1983)	Live at the Theatre Boulogne-Billancourt Paris (1994)

Live at the Theatre Boulogne-Billancourt Paris is a live album by Dameronia, a jazz ensemble founded by Don Sickler and Philly Joe Jones that performed the compositions and arrangements of Tadd Dameron. It was recorded on May 30, 1989, roughly four years after Jones's death, in a suburb of Paris, and was released in 1994 by the Soul Note label. The ensemble is conducted by Sickler, who also appears on trumpet, and features saxophonists Clifford Jordan, Cecil Payne, and Frank Wess, trumpeter Virgil Jones, trombonist Benny Powell, pianist Walter Davis Jr., double bassist Larry Ridley, and drummer Kenny Washington.

== Reception ==
Professional ratings
Review scores
Source	Rating
AllMusic	4/5 stars
Tom Hull – on the Web	B+
The Penguin Guide to Jazz	3.5/4 stars
Scott Yanow	8/10 stars

In a review for AllMusic, Scott Yanow wrote: "The ensembles are very much in Dameron's classic style, but all of the musicians also have plenty of solo space. Tadd Dameron's legacy was very well served by Dameronia, and this set is a fine tribute." In a separate review, Yanow commented: "Such a pity that Dameron could not have kept a group of this caliber and size together during his life."

The authors of The Penguin Guide to Jazz Recordings stated: "the intention is to represent the composer's music accurately, but with the same level of freedom for soloists to express themselves. Clearly neither Sackler nor Virgil Jones has the passionate ring of a Fats Navarro... but their performances are more than routine." They also praised the rendition of "Fontainebleau," noting that it is "beautifully orchestrated and balanced, with a delicate touch from everybody concerned."

== Track listing ==
"Good Bait" was composed by Count Basie and Tadd Dameron. Remaining tracks were composed by Tadd Dameron.

1. "Hot House" – 6:51
2. "Mating Call" – 8:57
3. "Gnid" – 7:41
4. "Lady Bird" – 5:45
5. "Good Bait" – 6:32
6. "Soultrane" – 6:11
7. "The Squirrel" – 6:00
8. "Philly J. J." – 9:22
9. "Fontainebleau" – 5:02

== Personnel ==
- Don Sickler – trumpet, conductor
- Frank Wess – alto saxophone, flute
- Clifford Jordan – tenor saxophone, soprano saxophone
- Cecil Payne – baritone saxophone
- Virgil Jones – trumpet
- Benny Powell – trombone
- Walter Davis Jr. – piano
- Larry Ridley – double bass
- Kenny Washington – drums
