= Expansion Slang =

Studio album by Ken Vandermark
- Released: 2000
- Recorded: April 16 & 17, 1998
- Studio: PBS Studios, Westwood, Massachusetts
- Genre: Jazz
- Length: 59:33
- Label: Boxholder
- Producer: Tripleplay

Ken Vandermark chronology
Design in Time (1999)	Expansion Slang (2000)	English Suites (2000)

Expansion Slang is an album by American jazz reedist Ken Vandermark, which was recorded in 1998 and released on Boxholder. It was the debut recording by Tripleplay, which features bassist Nate McBride and drummer Curt Newton, one of the rhythm sections in Utility Hitter by the Barrage Double Trio.

== Reception ==
In his review for All About Jazz, Micah Holmquist states "This is truly a trio recording in that none of the players dominate the music and all show flashes of creativity."

== Track listing ==
1. "Optica Torre" (Vandermark) – 12:18
2. "Daka Du" (McBride) – 6:50
3. "Alumni Forms" (Vandermark) – 14:56
4. "Hook and Ladder" (McBride) – 4:16
5. "In Sequence" (Vandermark) – 21:13

== Personnel ==
- Ken Vandermark – reeds
- Nate McBride – bass
- Curt Newton – drums
