= Sun Ra and his Solar Arkestra Visits Planet Earth =

Studio album by Sun Ra and his Solar Arkestra
- Released: 1966
- Recorded: 1956–58, Chicago
- Genre: Jazz
- Length: 31:33
- Label: Saturn; Evidence
- Producer: Alton Abraham

Sun Ra and his Solar Arkestra chronology
Sound of Joy (1956)	Sun Ra and his Solar Arkestra Visits Planet Earth (1966)	The Nubians of Plutonia (1958)

Professional ratings
Review scores
Source	Rating
Allmusic	4.5/5 stars

Sun Ra and his Solar Arkestra Visits Planet Earth is a jazz album by the American musician Sun Ra and his Solar Arkestra. Recorded between late 1956 and 1958, the album was originally released on Ra's own Saturn label in 1966, and was reissued on CD by Evidence in 1992. In keeping with many Saturn releases, one side features cuts from the arkestra c.1958, whilst the other side comes from the 1956 sessions originally intended for Sound of Joy but still unreleased in 1966.

== Track listing ==
=== 12" Vinyl ===
All songs by Sun Ra unless otherwise noted;
Side A:

1. "Planet Earth" - (4.54)
2. "Eve" - (5.35)
3. "Overtones of China" - (4.21)

Side B:

1. "Reflections in Blue" - (5.55)
2. "Two Tones" (Patrick, Davis) - (3.36)
3. "El Viktor" - (2.28)
4. "Saturn" - (3.55)

The sides were switched for the Evidence reissue, as well as being coupled with the album Interstellar Low Ways.

== Musicians ==
On "Reflections in Blue", "Two Tones", "El Viktor" and "Saturn", recorded at the Balkan Studio, Chicago, November 1, 1956;

- Sun Ra – Piano, Wurlitzer electric piano
- Art Hoyle – Trumpet
- John Avant or Julian Priester – Trombone
- Pat Patrick – Alto sax, tenor sax
- John Gilmore – Tenor sax
- Charles Davis – Baritone sax
- Victor Sproles – Bass
- William Cochran – Drums
- Jim Herndon – Tympani, timbales

On "Planet Earth", "Eve" and "Overtones of China" recorded at Rehearsals, late 1957 or 1958;

- Sun Ra – Wurlitzer Electric Piano, Piano, Percussion
- Lucious Randolph – Trumpet
- Nate Pryor – Trombone
- James Spaulding – Alto Sax
- Marshall Allen – Alto Sax, Flute
- John Gilmore – Tenor Sax, Percussion
- Pat Patrick – Baritone Sax, Alto Sax, 'Space Lute', Percussion
- Charles Davis – Baritone Sax
- Ronnie Boykins – Bass
- Robert Barry – Drums
- Jim Herndon – Tympani

== See also ==
- Sun Ra discography
