= Play What You Feel =

Live album by The Clifford Jordan Big Band
- Released: 1997
- Recorded: December 25–31, 1990
- Venue: Condon's, NYC
- Genre: Jazz
- Length: 69:36
- Label: Mapleshade MHS 512629A
- Producer: Clifford Jordan, Pierre Sprey

Clifford Jordan chronology
The Mellow Side of Clifford Jordan (1989-90)	Play What You Feel (1997)	Down Through the Years (1991)

Play What You Feel is a live album by saxophonist Clifford Jordan's Big Band which was recorded in New York City in 1990 and released on the Mapleshade label in 1997.

== Reception ==
Professional ratings
Review scores
Source	Rating
AllMusic	4.5/5 stars
The Penguin Guide to Jazz Recordings	3.5/4 stars

The AllMusic review by Scott Yanow observed: "In 1990, tenor-saxophonist Clifford Jordan achieved one of his lifetime goals and formed a big band. They recorded a demo in December, 1990, that helped land them a record deal ... The music on Play What You Feel, which was originally the demo, was released for the first time in 1997. The 16-piece orchestra, which includes many of Jordan's friends and longtime associates, was loose but tight, featuring strong solos, spirited ensembles and colorful straight-ahead arrangements ... all of the selections are fun and swinging. This is a highly recommended if little-known gem that makes one happy that Clifford Jordan was able to achieve his goal".

== Track listing ==
No.	Title	Writer(s)	Length
1.	"Third Avenue"	Clifford Jordan	9:31
2.	"Angelica"	Duke Ellington	10:40
3.	"Old Bo"	Jordan	5:17
4.	"I Waited for You"	Dizzy Gillespie	6:22
5.	"Introduction to Evidence"	Jordan	0:31
6.	"Evidence"	Thelonious Monk	7:24
7.	"I'll Be Around"	Alec Wilder	5:24
8.	"Bearcat"	Jordan	6:14
9.	"Down Through the Years"	Jordan	7:17
10.	"Charlie Parker's Last Supper"	Jordan	6:55
11.	"Don't Get Around Much Anymore"	Ellington, Bob Russell	3:30
12.	"Band Roster"	Jordan	0:44
Total length:			69:36

== Personnel ==
- Clifford Jordan – tenor saxophone, bandleader
- Joe Gardner, Dean Pratt, Dizzy Reece, Don Sickler – trumpet
- Benny Powell – trombone
- Kiane Zawadi – trombone, euphonium
- Charles Davis, John Jenkins - alto saxophone
- Junior Cook, Lou Orenstein, Willie Williams – tenor saxophone
- Robert Eldridge – baritone saxophone
- Ronnie Mathews – piano
- Ed Howard – bass
- Tommy Campbell – drums
