= Live at the Glenn Miller Café =

Live album by AALY Trio + Ken Vandermark
- Released: 1999
- Recorded: March 10, 1999
- Venue: Glenn Miller Café, Stockholm
- Genre: Jazz
- Length: 50:54
- Label: Wobbly Rail
- Producer: AALY Trio, Mac McCaughan

Ken Vandermark chronology
Simpatico (1999)	Live at the Glenn Miller Café (1999)	Design in Time (1999)

Live at the Glenn Miller Café is the third album by the AALY Trio + Ken Vandermark, which was recorded in Stockholm in 1999 and released on Wobbly Rail, a short-lived imprint started by Merge Records/Superchunk principal Mac McCaughan. AALY Trio is a Swedish free jazz band led by saxophonist Mats Gustafsson. Originally just a guest, Vandermark became a full member of the group.

== Reception ==
Professional ratings
Review scores
Source	Rating
AllMusic	4/5 stars
The Penguin Guide to Jazz	3.5/4 stars

In his review for AllMusic, Brian Olewnick states "Overall, a fine, substantial album showing the trio (plus one) in solid form."

The Penguin Guide to Jazz says "There is an absolutely overwhelming treatment of Albert Ayler's 'Ghosts' and a vibrant version of Joe Harriott's 'Idioms', which sounds better than anything on Vandermark's own Joe Harriott Project record."

The JazzTimes review by Harvey Pekar notes that "Gustafsson and Vandermark perform wide open during most of the album, honking, screaming, rasping and playing as rapidly as possible."

== Track listing ==
1. "Unit Character" (Ken Vandermark) – 8:56
2. "Ghosts" (Albert Ayler) – 17:42
3. "Alva Jo" (Mats Gustafsson) – 12:21
4. "Idioms" (Joe Harriott) – 11:55

== Personnel ==
- Mats Gustafsson - alto sax, tenor sax
- Ken Vandermark - tenor sax, clarinet
- Peter Janson - bass
- Kjell Nordeson - drums
