= James Spaulding Plays the Legacy of Duke Ellington =

Studio album by James Spaulding
- Released: 1977
- Recorded: December 1 & 2, 1976
- Studio: Blank Studios, New York City
- Genre: Jazz
- Length: 41:45
- Label: Storyville; JS-140
- Producer: Marty Cann

James Spaulding chronology
James Spaulding Plays the Legacy of Duke Ellington (1977)	Gotstabe a Better Way! (1988)

James Spaulding Plays the Legacy of Duke Ellington is an album by saxophonist James Spaulding featuring compositions by Duke Ellington which was recorded in 1976 and released on the Danish Storyville label.

== Reception ==
Professional ratings
Review scores
Source	Rating
AllMusic	3/5 stars

The AllMusic review by Scott Yanow stated "Despite being a top altoist and flutist since at least the mid-'60s, when he played with Freddie Hubbard's band, James Spaulding did not get his recording debut as a leader until this 1976 LP. Spaulding, on various flutes, piccolo, soprano and alto, performs eight songs associated with Duke Ellington ... The most unusual aspect of this set is that Avery Brooks (who has a deep baritone that Ellington might have liked) sings four of the eight songs. A sincere tribute".

== Track listing ==
All compositions by Duke Ellington except where noted

1. "Take the "A" Train" (Duke Ellington, Billy Strayhorn) – 4:34
2. "In a Sentimental Mood" – 5:56
3. "Come Sunday" – 5:31
4. "Caravan" (Ellington, Juan Tizol) – 5:30
5. "I Love You Madly" – 2:13
6. "Lucky So and So" (Ellington, Mack David) – 4:36
7. "Sophisticated Lady" – 6:22
8. "It Don't Mean a Thing (If It Ain't Got That Swing)" – 7:03

== Personnel ==
- James Spaulding – alto saxophone, flute, piccolo, soprano saxophone, bass flute
- Cedar Walton – piano
- Steve Nelson – vibraphone
- Sam Jones – bass
- Billy Higgins – drums
- Mtume – percussion
- Avery Brooks – vocals (tracks 3, 4, 5 & 7)
