= Robert Barry (musician) =

American jazz musician

- Born: December 4, 1932
- Died: January 8, 2018 Chicago, Illinois, U.S.
- Genres: Avant-garde jazz, free jazz, experimental
- Instruments: Drums, percussion
- Formerly of: Sun Ra

Robert Barry (December 4, 1932 – January 8, 2018) was an American jazz musician. He was a percussionist who played with Miles Davis, Gene Ammons, Fred Anderson and Johnny Griffin but was best known for his work with Sun Ra and the Sun Ra Arkestra.

== Early life and career ==
Barry was born in Chicago. He graduated from DuSable High School, where he studied under Captain Walter Dyett.

Barry joined the Sun Ra Arkestra in the 1950s, appearing on albums such as We Travel the Space Ways, Nubians of Plutonia, and Sun Song. However, when the Arkestra moved to New York City in 1961, Barry stayed in Chicago, ending his tenure with the band.

== Discography ==
As co-leader

- Duets 2001 (Thrill Jockey, 2001) with Fred Anderson
- Chicago Overtones (hatOLOGY, 2005) with Daniele D'Agaro, Jeb Bishop, and Kent Kessler

With Lin Halliday and Ira Sullivan

- Where or When (Delmark, 1994)

With Sun Ra

- Jazz by Sun Ra (Transition, 1957)
- Super-Sonic Jazz (Saturn, 1957)
- Angels and Demons at Play (Saturn, 1965)
- The Nubians of Plutonia (Saturn, 1966)
- Sun Ra and his Solar Arkestra Visits Planet Earth (Saturn, 1966)
- We Travel the Space Ways (Saturn, 1967)
- Atlantis (Saturn, 1969)
- Continuation (Saturn, 1970)
- Music from Tomorrow's World: Chicago 1960 (Atavistic, 1960 [2002])
- Spaceship Lullaby: Chicago 1954–60 (Atavistic, 1954–60 [2003])

With Ken Vandermark's Sound in Action Trio

- Design in Time (Delmark, 1999)
- Gate (Atavistic, 2006)
