= Dameronia =

Bebop jazz ensemble

- Genres: Jazz; bebop
- Years active: 1982–1989
- Labels: Uptown; Soul Note
- Past members: Don Sickler; Philly Joe Jones; Johnny Coles; Britt Woodman; Charles Davis; Frank Wess; Cecil Payne; Walter Davis Jr.; Larry Ridley; John Oddo; Virgil Jones; Benny Powell; Clifford Jordan; Kenny Washington

Dameronia was the name of a bebop jazz ensemble founded by Don Sickler and Philly Joe Jones in the 1980s that featured the original compositions and arrangements of Tadd Dameron. They recorded three albums, two for Uptown Records and the other for Soul Note Records, and continued to perform even after Jones's death in 1985. A nonet, it included several of the Dameron's colleagues and attempted to create a "historically accurate" representation of his music.

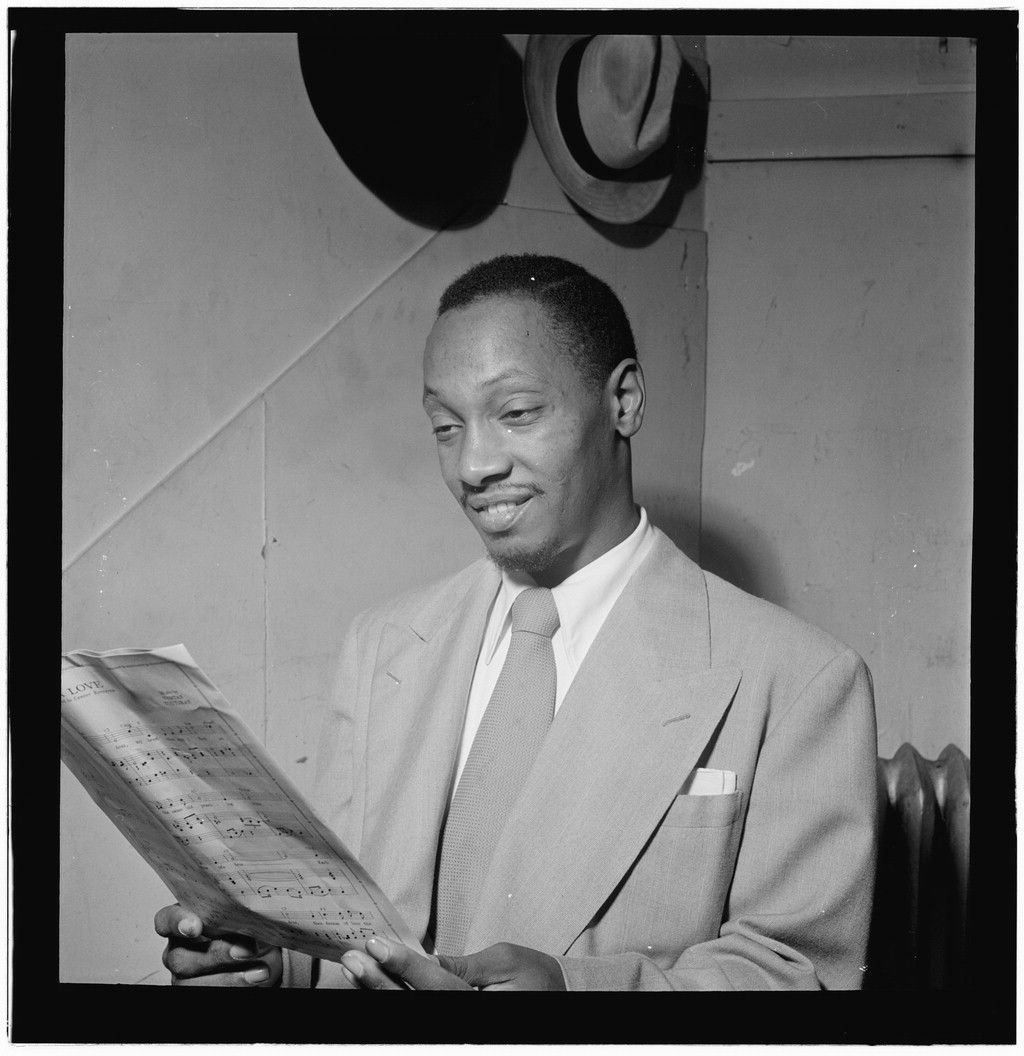
Bebop pianist and composer Tadd Dameron in 1947; by William P. Gottlieb

== Personnel ==
The original line-up included:

- Johnny Coles – flugelhorn
- Don Sickler – trumpet; conducting, additional arranging, transcription
- Britt Woodman – trombone
- Charles Davis, Frank Wess, Cecil Payne – saxophones
- Walter Davis Jr. – piano
- Larry Ridley – bass
- Philly Joe Jones – drums
- John Oddo – transcription

Later configurations included:

- Virgil Jones – trumpet
- Benny Powell – trombone
- Clifford Jordan – tenor saxophone
- Kenny Washington – drums (after Jones's death)

== Performances ==
Dameronia performed at various jazz clubs, concert halls, and festivals, debuting in Greenwich Village at Lush Life in 1982. In 1988, Dameronia was featured in a concert at Jazz at Lincoln Center entitled "The Music of Tadd Dameron". The opening act was an all-star quartet featuring Tommy Flanagan, George Mraz, Kenny Washington, and Charlie Rouse.

== Discography ==
- 1982: To Tadd with Love (Uptown)
- 1983: Look Stop Listen (Uptown) with Johnny Griffin
- 1989: Live at the Theatre Boulogne-Billancourt Paris (Soul Note)
