= Atlantis (Sun Ra album) =

Studio album by Sun Ra
- Released: 1969
- Recorded: August 4, 1967 ("Atlantis"); September 22, 1968 (remainder)
- Venue: The Olatunji Center of African Culture, New York ("Atlantis")
- Studio: Sun, New York, NY (remainder)
- Genre: Avant-garde jazz
- Length: 42:35 (original release); 40:46 (Impulse reissue)
- Label: Saturn, Impulse!, Evidence
- Producer: Alton Abraham

Sun Ra chronology
Continuation (1968)	Atlantis (1969)	My Brother the Wind (1970)

Reissue cover
- 1973 Impulse! reissue

Professional ratings
Review scores
Source	Rating
All About Jazz	(not rated)
AllMusic	5/5 stars
The Penguin Guide to Jazz Recordings	4/4 stars

Atlantis is an album by American jazz musician Sun Ra and his Astro-Infinity Arkestra, released in 1969 by El Saturn Records.

The album heavily features the "Solar Sound Instrument", a Hohner Clavinet. One of the four compositions which originally featured on Side 1 of the original release was substituted by a different piece for the 1973 reissue, though reusing the same name, "Yucatan". Both pieces appear on the later CD reissue.

The title track covered the second side of the LP and is regarded as a key prototype for Sun Ra's performances through the 1970s. It was recorded at a 1967 concert at the Olatunji Center of African Culture in New York and has been described as "a masterpiece that twists and turns through many soundscapes".

[The title track Atlantis is] one of Ra's most epic pieces, which is free or 'space' jazz at its most invigorating. While virtually indescribable, the sonic churnings and juxtaposed images reveal a brilliant display of textures and tonalities set against an ocean of occasional rhythms. Its diversity alone makes this is an essential entry in the voluminous Sun Ra catalog.
—Lindsay Planer

== Recording sessions ==
Side one was likely recorded at Sun Studios, New York (the Arkestra's commune), between 1967 and 1969. The title track on side two was recorded at the Olatunji Cultural Center on 125th Street, NY, in 1967. A different piece, titled "Yucatan", was also recorded at the same period and later included for the Impulse reissue in 1973. Both versions of "Yucatan" were included when Evidence reissued Atlantis in the 1990s. This arrangement remained when Sun Ra's entire back catalog was remastered and reissued by Ra's estate (under the supervision of Irwin Chusid) in 2014.

== Track listing ==
All tracks written by Sun Ra.

Side A:

1. "Mu" – 4:30
2. "Lemuria" – 5:02
3. "Yucatan" (either Saturn version, 5:27 or Impulse! version, 3:38)
4. "Bimini" – 5:45

Side B:

1. "Atlantis" – 21:51

== Personnel ==
- Sun Ra – Solar Sound Organ, Solar Sound Instrument (Clavinet)
- John Gilmore- Tenor Saxophone, Percussion
- Pat Patrick- Baritone Saxophone, Flute
- Marshall Allen- Alto Saxophone, Oboe
- Danny Ray Thompson – Alto Saxophone, Flute
- Bob Barry – Drums, Lightning Drum
- Wayne Harris – Trumpet
- Ebah – Trumpet
- Carl Nimrod – Space Drums
- James Jacson – Log Drums
- Robert Cummins – Bass Clarinet
- Danny Davis – Alto Saxophone
- Ali Harsan – Trombone
- Alton Abraham – Producer (for Ihnfinity inc.)
