= Look Stop Listen =

Studio album by Philly Joe Jones Dameronia featuring Johnny Griffin
- Released: 1983
- Recorded: July 11, 1983
- Studio: Van Gelder Studio Englewood Cliffs, NJ
- Genre: Jazz
- Length: 55:10
- Label: Uptown; UP 27.15
- Producer: Helen Keane, Mark Feldman, Robert E. Sunenblick MD.

Philly Joe Jones chronology
To Tadd with Love (1982)	Look Stop Listen (1983)	The Rotterdam Session (1985)

Dameronia chronology
To Tadd with Love (1982)	Look Stop Listen (1983)	Live at the Theatre Boulogne-Billancourt Paris (1994)

Look Stop Listen (listed on label as Look Stop and Listen) is an album by drummer Philly Joe Jones' Dameronia which was recorded and released on the Uptown label in 1983.

== Reception ==
Professional ratings
Review scores
Source	Rating
AllMusic	4.5/5 stars
The Rolling Stone Album Guide	4/5 stars

The album was nominated for Best Jazz Instrumental Performance, Group at the 27th Annual Grammy Awards.

The AllMusic review by Scott Yanow said the album was "Highly recommended".

== Track listing ==
All compositions by Tadd Dameron except where noted

1. "Look, Stop and Listen" – 5:52
2. "If You Could See Me Now" – 5:34
3. "Choose Now" – 5:30
4. "Focus" – 5:49
5. "Killer Joe" (Benny Golson) – 6:08
6. "Dial B for Beauty" – 5:05
7. "Our Delight" – 4:27
8. "Theme of No Repeat" – 5:52
9. "If You Could See Me Now" [1st Take] – 5:41 Additional track on CD release
10. "Look, Stop and Listen" [1st Take] – 5:12 Additional track on CD release

== Personnel ==
- Philly Joe Jones – drums
- Johnny Griffin – tenor saxophone (tracks 1, 2, 5 & 8–10)
- Don Sickler – trumpet, tenor saxophone, director
- Virgil Jones – trumpet
- Benny Powell – trombone
- Frank Wess – alto saxophone, flute
- Charles Davis – tenor saxophone, flute
- Cecil Payne – baritone saxophone
- Walter Davis Jr. – piano
- Larry Ridley – double bass
