= Breath of Life (Louis Hayes album) =

Studio album by Louis Hayes
- Released: 1974
- Recorded: February 2 and July 26, 1974
- Studio: RCA Studios, NYC
- Genre: Jazz
- Length: 41:43
- Label: Muse; MR 5052
- Producer: Don Schlitten and Louis Hayes

Louis Hayes chronology
Louis Hayes (1960)	Breath of Life (1974)	Ichi-Ban (1976)

Breath of Life is an album led by drummer Louis Hayes which was recorded in 1974 and released on the Muse label.

Professional ratings
Review scores
Source	Rating
Allmusic	3/5 stars

== Track listing ==
1. "Brothers and Sisters" (Tex Allen) – 9:12
2. "Breath of Life" (Charles Davis) – 5:07
3. "Olea" (Davis) – 5:41
4. "Purely Unintentional" (Louis Hayes) – 8:44
5. "Bongolo" (Hayes) – 3:28
6. "Kong's Dance" (Allen) – 9:26

== Personnel ==
- Louis Hayes – drums
- Tex Allen – trumpet, flugelhorn
- Gerald Hayes – alto saxophone
- Charles Davis – baritone saxophone, soprano saxophone
- Ronnie Mathews – piano
- David Williams – bass
- Toot Monk – congas, percussion
