= Jazz by Sun Ra =

1957 debut album by Sun Ra and his Arkestra

Jazz By Sun Ra
- Original Transition pressing, 1957

Studio album by Sun Ra and his Arkestra
- Released: 1957
- Recorded: July 12, 1956
- Studio: Universal Recording Corp. (Chicago)
- Genres: Post-bop, big band
- Length: 40:14
- Labels: Transition; Delmark
- Producer: Tom Wilson

Sun Ra and his Arkestra chronology
Jazz By Sun Ra (1957)	Super-Sonic Jazz (1957)

reissue cover
- Delmark reissue 1967, retitled Sun Song

Professional ratings
Review scores
Source	Rating
AllMusic	4/5 stars
DownBeat	4/5 stars
The Penguin Guide to Jazz Recordings	3/4 stars
The Rolling Stone Jazz Record Guide	4/5 stars

Jazz By Sun Ra (later titled Sun Song) is the debut album by Sun Ra. The record label for the first pressing says "07-12-56", presumably when it was recorded. The LP originally appeared on Tom Wilson's short-lived Transition Records. In the mid-1960s it was purchased (along with much of the Transition catalog) by Delmark Records owner Bob Koester, finally being reissued in 1967.

When originally released, it came with an extensive booklet featuring words and photos of Sun Ra and his Arkestra. The LP featured original compositions by Sun Ra along with one by Arkestral bassist Richard Evans. Another composition by Arkestra member Julian Priester has been included in reissues from the session, and additional unreleased tracks (all Ra originals) are known to survive. The single non-Arkestral composition was Possession, by Harry Revel, which had been written for Les Baxter's album Perfume Set to Music; Possession was arranged for the Arkestra by the Texan pianist and composer Prince Shell.

Earlier home recordings by Ra, including one dating from 1948 or 1949, were released with tracks from 1973 on the album Deep Purple.

== Track listing ==
All tracks are written by Sun Ra except where noted.

Side A
No.	Title	Writer(s)	Length
1.	"Brainville"		4:29
2.	"Call For All Demons"		4:30
3.	"Transition"		3:40
4.	"Possession"	Harry Revel	5:00
5.	"Street Named Hell"		3:55
Total length:			21:34

Side B
No.	Title	Writer(s)	Length
6.	"Lullaby For Realville"	Richard Evans	4:40
7.	"Future"		3:15
8.	"New Horizons"		3:05
9.	"Fall Off The Log"		4:00
10.	"Sun Song"		3:40
Total length:			18:40

When reissued on Compact Disc in 1991, "Swing a Little Taste" was added. This was originally released on the Transition sampler Jazz in Transition alongside tracks by artists such as Cecil Taylor, Donald Byrd and John Coltrane.

=== CD version ===
1. "Brainville" (Sun Ra) 4:29
2. "Call for all Demons" (Sun Ra) 4:30
3. "Transition" (Sun Ra) 3:40
4. "Possession" (Harry Revel) 5:00
5. "Street Named Hell" (Sun Ra) 3:55
6. "Lullaby for Realville" (Richard Evans) 4:40
7. "Future" (Sun Ra) 3:15
8. "Swing a Little Taste" (Sun Ra) 4:25
9. "New Horizons" (Sun Ra) 3:05
10. "Fall off the Log" (Sun Ra) 4:00
11. "Sun Song" (Sun Ra) 3:40

== Musicians ==
- Sun Ra - Piano, Hammond B-3 organ, Percussion
- Art Hoyle - Trumpet, Percussion
- Dave Young - Trumpet, Percussion
- Julian Priester - Trombone, Percussion
- James Scales - Alto Sax
- John Gilmore - Tenor sax, Percussion
- Pat Patrick - Baritone Sax, Percussion
- Richard Evans - Bass
- Wilburn Green - Electric Bass, Percussion
- Robert Barry - Drums
- Jim Herndon - Tympani

Recorded Universal Recording, Chicago, July 12, 1956

== Pressings ==
Year	Format	Region	Label	Title
1957	LP	US	Transition	Jazz By Sun Ra
1957	LP	SE	Sonet	Jazz By Sun Ra
1967	LP	US	Delmark	Sun Song
1968	LP	UK	Delmark	Sun Song
1971	LP	FR	Goody	Sun Song
1972	LP	JP	Trio	Jazz By Sun Ra
1990	CD	US	Delmark	Sun Song
1993	Cass	US	Delmark	Sun Song
2001	LP	US	Delmark	Sun Song
2003	CD	JP	P-Vine	Sun Song
2009	LP	NL	6 Spices, Music & Words	Sun Song
2012	CD	JP	P-Vine	Sun Song
2014	CD	US	Delmark	Sun Song
2015	LP	UK	Poppydisc & Rev-Ola	Jazz By Sun Ra
2016	LP	UK	Poppydisc & Rev-Ola	Jazz By Sun Ra
2019	LP	UK	Not Now Music	Jazz By Sun Ra

== External sources ==
- Complete Sun Ra Discography
