= Walter Davis Jr. =

American jazz pianist (1932–1990)

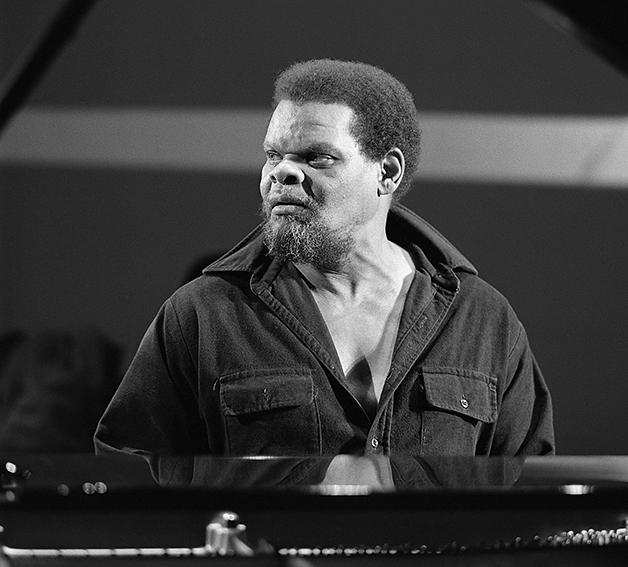

Background information
- Born: September 2, 1932; Richmond, Virginia, U.S.
- Died: June 2, 1990 (aged 57) New York City, New York, U.S.
- Genres: Jazz, bebop
- Occupation: Musician
- Instrument: Piano
- Years active: 1940s–1990
- Labels: Blue Note, Denon, Palcoscenico, Mapleshade, SteepleChase
- Formerly of: Jazz Messengers
- Spouse: Mayme Watts

Walter Davis Jr. (September 2, 1932 – June 2, 1990) was an American bebop and hard bop pianist.

Davis once left the music world to be a tailor, but returned. A soloist, bandleader, and accompanist, he amassed a body of work while never becoming a high-profile name even within the jazz community. Davis played with Babs Gonzales' Three Bips & a Bop as a teen, then moved from Richmond to New York in the early 1950s. He played with Max Roach and Charlie Parker, recording with Roach in 1953.

He joined Dizzy Gillespie's band in 1956, and toured the Middle East and South America. He also played in Paris with Donald Byrd in 1958 and with Art Blakey & the Jazz Messengers in 1959.

After retiring from music for a while to run his tailor shop, Davis returned in the 1960s, producing records and writing arrangements for a local New Jersey group. He studied music in India in 1979, and played with Sonny Rollins in the early 1970s.

== Biography ==
Davis was born in Richmond, Virginia and raised in East Orange, New Jersey. His mother played gospel music and he had uncles who were pianists. As a teenager, he performed with Babs Gonzales in Newark. In the 1950s, Davis recorded with Melba Liston and Max Roach. He played with Roach, Charlie Parker, and Dizzy Gillespie. In 1958, he played with trumpeter Donald Byrd at Le Chat Qui Pêche in Paris and shortly after realized his dream of becoming pianist and composer-arranger for Art Blakey's Jazz Messengers. In 1959, he briefly appeared on stage as one of the heroin-addicted musicians in a production of The Connection. Davis married songwriter Mayme Watts, who was performing as a vocalist with the Walter Davis Jr. Trio.

Although he retired from music in the 1960s to work as a tailor, painter, and designer, he returned to his music career later that decade, and in the 1970s he performed with Sonny Rollins and again with the Jazz Messengers. He recorded with many other prominent jazz musicians, including Kenny Clarke, Sonny Criss, Jackie McLean, Pierre Michelot and Archie Shepp.

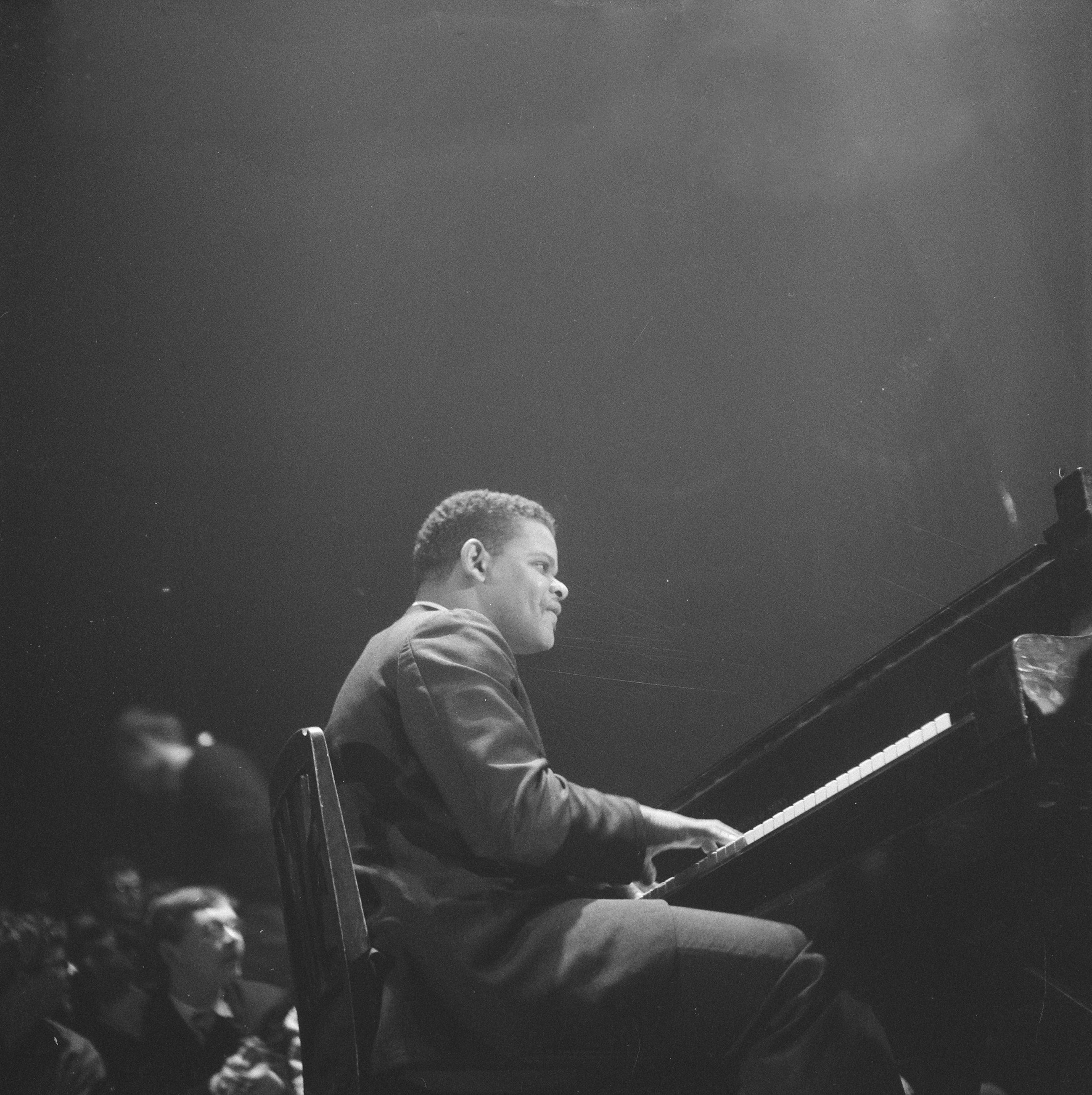
Davis in Amsterdam

Davis was known as an interpreter of the music of Bud Powell, but also recorded an album capturing the compositional and piano style of Thelonious Monk. Several of his compositions served as titles for albums by Blakey's Jazz Messengers. Combining traditional harmonies with modal patterns and featuring numerous rhythmic shifts along with internal melodic motifs within operatic, aria-like sweeping melodies, Davis's compositions included "Scorpio Rising", "Backgammon", "Uranus", "Gypsy Folk Tales", "Jodi", and "Ronnie Is a Dynamite Lady".

Davis had an occasional role as the piano player on the CBS television comedy Frank's Place. He also contributed to the soundtrack of the Clint Eastwood film Bird (1988).

== Death ==
Davis died in New York City on June 2, 1990, aged 57, from complications of liver and kidney disease.

== Discography ==
=== As leader ===
Year recorded	Title	Label	Notes
1959	Davis Cup	Blue Note	Quintet, with Donald Byrd (trumpet), Jackie McLean (alto sax), Sam Jones bass), Art Taylor (drums)
1977	Illumination	Denon	With Buster Williams (bass), Bruno Carr or Art Blakey (drums); Jeremy Steig (flute) added for one track
1979	Night Song	Denon	Trio, with Tom Barney (bass, electric bass), Kenny Washington (drums)
1977	Abide with Me	Denon	With Carter Jefferson (tenor sax), Charles Sullivan (trumpet), Buster Williams (bass), Tony Williams (drums); Naná Vasconcelos (percussion) and Milton Frustino (guitar) added for one track
1979	Blues Walk	Red	Roy Burrowes (trumpet), Johnny Dyani (bass), Clifford Jarvis (drums); recorded in Milan, Italy
1979	A Being Such As You	Red	Solo piano; recorded in Milan, Italy
1979?	Uranus	Palcoscenico	
1979?	400 Years Ago Tomorrow	Owl	
1981?	Live au Dreher		Trio, with Pierre Michelot (bass), Kenny Clarke (drums); in concert
1987	In Walked Thelonious	Mapleshade	Solo piano
1989	Scorpio Rising	SteepleChase	Trio, with Santi Debriano (bass), Ralph Peterson (drums)
1989	The Salerno Concert	Reel to Real Records	Bob Mover (alto saxophone); released in 2024
1989	Jazznost: Moscow-Washington Jazz Summit	Mapleshade	Igor Butman (saxophone), Sergei Gourbelashvili (saxophone), Vyacheslav Nazarov (trombone), Victor Gouseinov (trumpet), Yevgeny Maslov (piano), Santi Debriano (bass), Bobby Battle (drums);

=== As sideman ===
With Art Blakey

- Africaine (Blue Note, 1959)
- Paris Jam Session (Fontana, 1961)
- Roots & Herbs (Blue Note, 1961)
- Gypsy Folk Tales (Roulette, 1977)

With Nick Brignola

- Burn Brigade (Bee Hive, 1979)

With Donald Byrd

- Byrd in Hand (Blue Note, 1959)

With Sonny Criss

- This is Criss! (Prestige, 1966)
- Portrait of Sonny Criss (Prestige, 1967)

With Dameronia

- To Tadd with Love (Uptown, 1982)
- Look Stop Listen (Uptown, 1983)
- Live at the Theatre Boulogne-Billancourt Paris (Soul Note, 1989 [1994])

With Walt Dickerson

- Walt Dickerson Plays Unity (Audio Fidelity, 1964)

With Teddy Edwards

- Nothin' But the Truth! (Prestige, 1966)

With Dizzy Gillespie

- World Statesman (Norgran, 1956)
- Dizzy in Greece (Verve, 1957)

With Slide Hampton

- Explosion! The Sound of Slide Hampton (Atlantic, 1962)

With Etta Jones

- Ms. Jones to You (Muse, 1976)

With Philly Joe Jones

- Philly Joe's Beat (Atlantic, 1960)

With Jackie McLean

- New Soil (Blue Note, 1959)
- Let Freedom Ring (Blue Note, 1962)

With Hank Mobley

- Newark 1953 (Uptown, 1953 [2012])

With Max Roach

- The Max Roach Quartet featuring Hank Mobley (Debut, 1954)

With Julian Priester

- Spiritsville (Jazzland, 1960)

With Sonny Rollins

- Horn Culture (Milestone, 1973)

With Charlie Rouse

- Soul Mates (Uptown, 1988 [1993]) featuring Sahib Shihab

With Art Taylor

- Taylor's Tenors (Prestige, 1959)
