= T. S. Monk =

American jazz drummer (born 1949)

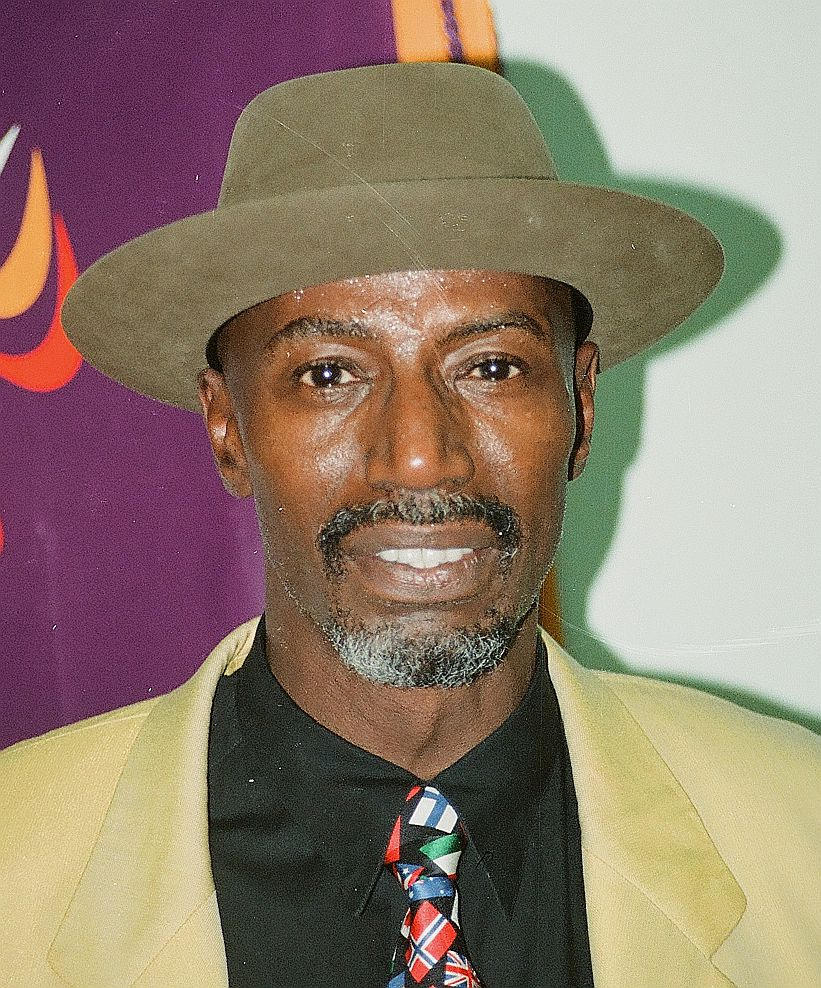
- Monk in 1998

Background information
- Born: Thelonious Sphere Monk III; December 27, 1949 (age 76); New York City, U.S.
- Genres: Jazz, funk, soul, hard bop, post-bop, neo-bop
- Occupations: Musician, composer, bandleader
- Instruments: Drums, percussion
- Years active: 1980–present
- Label: Blue Note
- Website: theloniousmonk.store

Thelonious Sphere Monk III (born December 27, 1949) is an American jazz drummer, composer and bandleader. He is the son of jazz pianist Thelonious Monk.

== Biography ==
Born in New York City, Monk began his music career early in his life, honing his skills throughout the 1970s. Monk's destiny was sealed when Art Blakey gave him his first drum set at the age of 15, and began lessons with Max Roach. After earning a reputation in school as a rabble-rouser (and graduating), the young Monk joined his father's trio and toured with his dad until the elder Monk's retirement in 1975. Monk then launched into the music that had captivated him and his generation, R&B. He first toured with a group called Natural Essence and afterward, along with his sister Barbara, formed his own band.

By the dawning of the 1980s, he had formed his eponymous band, which featured him on drums and occasional lead vocals. The group's début album, 1980's House of Music, featured several hits that placed on the Billboard R&B chart, including "Bon Bon Vie (Gimme the Good Life)", which featured Monk on lead vocals, and "Candidate for Love". The tracks peaked at No. 63 and No. 58 respectively, in the UK Singles Chart. The band went on to release two more albums throughout the early 1980s, though singles released from these albums did not fare as well as those on the début. The band broke up shortly thereafter.

Shortly after his father died in 1982, his sister, Barbara, died of cancer in 1984. To honor his father's legacy and support the efforts of education, Monk created the Thelonious Monk Institute of Jazz.

Monk received the New York Jazz Awards First Annual "Recording of the Year" award and Downbeats' 63rd annual Album of the Year Reader's Choice Award for Monk on Monk. This is the "80th Anniversary Birthday Tribute to Thelonious Sphere Monk" featuring 20 guest artists including Herbie Hancock, Wayne Shorter, Arturo Sandoval, Dianne Reeves, Nnenna Freelon, and Howard Johnson.

By the 1990s, Monk was ready to begin his solo career, in which he has taken a decidedly more jazz-oriented direction. For two consecutive seasons, December 1996 and January 1998, on ABC, jazz returned to network television after a twenty-five-year absence. Sponsored by Nissan and the Thelonious Monk Institute, under the guidance of Monk, a historic assemblage of artists gathered for 'A Celebration of America's Music' hosted by Bill Cosby and featuring Natalie Cole, Jon Secada, Tony Bennett, k.d. lang, as well as Thelonious performing his father's signature tune, "'Round Midnight", with Herbie Hancock, Pat Metheny, and Nnenna Freelon.

== Discography ==
=== Studio albums ===
- House of Music (Mirage, 1980)
- More of the Good Life (Mirage, 1981)
- Human (Mirage, 1982)
- Take One (Blue Note, 1992)
- Changing of the Guard (Blue Note, 1993)
- The Charm (Blue Note, 1995)
- Monk on Monk (N2K, 1997)
- Crosstalk (N-Coded Music, 1999)
- Higher Ground (Thelonious, 2003)

With Louis Hayes

- Breath of Life (Muse, 1974)

=== Singles ===
Year	Single	Peak chart positions			
Year	Single	US Dance	US R&B	US Pop	UK
1980	"Bon Bon Vie (Gimme the Good Life)"	13	11	63	63
1980	"Candidate for Love"	13	69	―	58
1981	"Too Much Too Soon"	―	56	―	―
1981	"More to Love"	―	75	―	―
1982	"Fantasy"	―	―	―	―
1982	"Human"	―	―	―	―
"—" denotes releases that did not chart or were not released in that territory.
