= Don Sickler =

American jazz trumpeter & producer (born 1944)

Don Sickler (born January 6, 1944) is an American jazz trumpeter, arranger, and producer.

In the 1980s, he set up a tribute band called Dameronia, with Philly Joe Jones, to play the music of Tadd Dameron.

He also worked extensively with Joe Henderson, a collaboration leading to four Grammy Awards.

Sickler and his wife, Maureen Sickler, have been the co-owners of the Van Gelder Studio since 2016, when it was entrusted to Maureen after the death of Rudy Van Gelder.

== Discography ==
=== As leader ===
- The Music of Kenny Dorham (Reservoir, 1983)
- Night Watch (Uptown, 1995)
- Reflections (HighNote, 2002)

With Dameronia

- To Tadd with Love (Uptown, 1982) with Philly Joe Jones
- Look Stop Listen (Uptown, 1983) with Philly Joe Jones
- Live at the Theatre Boulogne-Billancourt Paris (Soul Note, 1989 [1994])

=== As sideman ===
With Superblue

- Superblue (Blue Note, 1988)
- Superblue II (Blue Note)

With Larry Coryell

- Inner Urge (HighNote, 2001)

With Meredith d'Ambrosio

- Wishing on the Moon (Sunnyside, 2004 [2006])

With Clifford Jordan

- Play What You Feel (Mapleshade, 1990 [1997])
- Down Through the Years (Milestone, 1991)

With T. S. Monk

- Take One (Blue Note, 1992)
- Changing of the Guard (Blue Note, 1993)
- The Charm (Blue Note, 1995)
- Monk on Monk (N2K, 1997)

With Freddie Redd

- Lonely City (Uptown, 1985 [1989]) – trumpet and arranger

With Ben Riley

- Memories of T (Concord Jazz, 2003, 2005 [2006]) – trumpet and arranger

With Claudio Roditi

- Claudio! (Uptown, 1985) – as arranger

With Charlie Rouse

- Social Call (Uptown, 1984) with Red Rodney – as arranger
- Soul Mates (Uptown, 1988 [1993]) featuring Sahib Shihab – as arranger

With Jack Sheldon

- Playing for Change (Uptown, 1986 [1997]) – flugelhorn and arranger

With James Spaulding

- Blues Nexus (Muse, 1993) – flugelhorn on one track
- Escapade (HighNote, 1999)

With Buddy Tate and Al Grey

- Just Jazz (Uptown, 1984) – as arranger

With Joe Thomas and Jay McShann

- Blowin' in from K.C. (Uptown, 1983) – as arranger

With Jack Walrath

- Gut Feelings (Muse, 1990 [1992]) – as conductor

With Cedar Walton

- Cedar Walton Plays (Delos, 1986)
- Roots (Astor Place, 1997)

With Frank Wess and Johnny Coles

- Two at the Top (Uptown, 1983) – as arranger
