= James Spaulding =

American jazz saxophonist and flutist

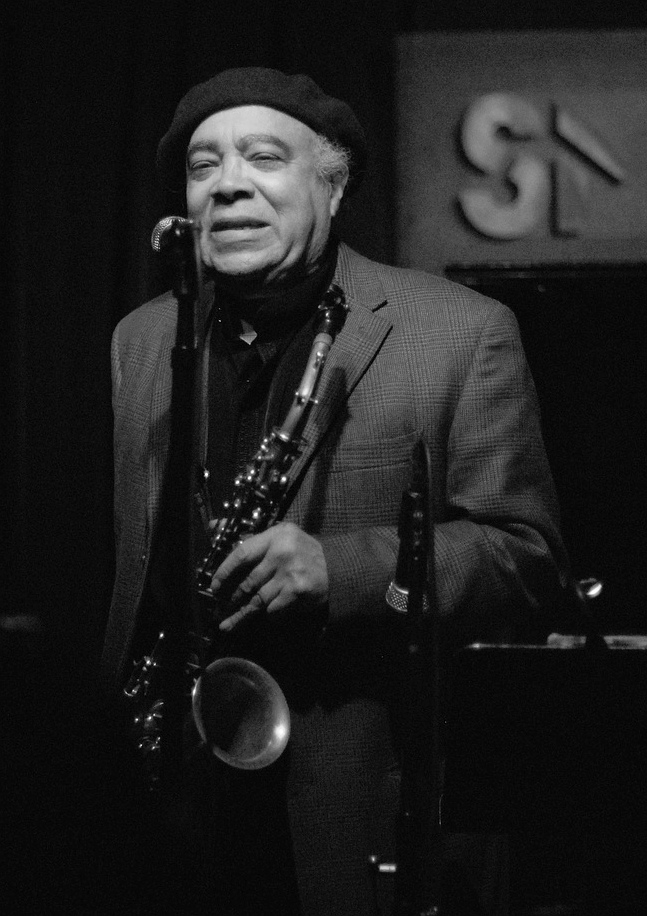
- Spaulding performing in 2006

Background information
- Born: James Ralph Spaulding Jr. July 30, 1937 (age 88); Indianapolis, Indiana, U.S.
- Genres: Jazz
- Occupation: Musician
- Instruments: Saxophone, Flute
- Labels: Storyville, Muse, 32 Records, HighNote, Marge

James Ralph Spaulding Jr. (was born July 30, 1937) is an American jazz saxophonist and flutist.

Born in Indianapolis, Indiana, United states, Spaulding attended the Chicago Cosmopolitan School of Music. Between 1957 and 1961, he was a member of Sun Ra's band. In the 1960s, he worked as a studio musician at Blue Note Records, recording with Wayne Shorter, Horace Silver, and Stanley Turrentine. He was also a member of Freddie Hubbard's quintet and the World Saxophone Quartet.

He went on to work with some post-bop musicians such as Max Roach, Randy Weston and Woody Shaw. Under the leadership of Mercer Ellington, in the 1970s, Spaulding played in the Duke Ellington Orchestra. In the 1980s, Spaulding worked with Ricky Ford and, as part of an octet, with David Murray.

== Discography ==
=== As leader ===
- 1976: James Spaulding Plays the Legacy of Duke Ellington (Storyville)
- 1988: Gotstabe a Better Way! (Muse)
- 1988: Brilliant Corners (Muse)
- 1991: Songs of Courage (Muse)
- 1993: Blues Nexus (Muse)
- 1997: The Smile of the Snake (HighNote)
- 1999: Escapade (HighNote)
- 2001: Blues Up & Over (Speetones)
- 2005: Round to It Vol. 2 (Speetones)
- 2006: Down With It (Marge)

=== As sideman ===
With Kamal Abdul-Alim

- Dance (Stash, 1983)

With Louis Armstrong

- Louis Armstrong and His Friends (Flying Dutchman/Amsterdam, 1970)

With Billy Bang

- Vietnam: Reflections (Justin Time, 2005)

With Kenny Barron

- Lucifer (Muse, 1975)

With Art Blakey

- Golden Boy (Colpix, 1964)

With Richard Davis

- Harvest (Muse, 1977 [1979])

With Ricky Ford

- Loxodonta Africana (New World, 1977)
- Shorter Ideas (Muse, 1984)
- Looking Ahead (Muse, 1986)
- Saxotic Stomp (Muse, 1987)

With Grant Green

- Solid (Blue Note, 1964)

With Freddie Hubbard

- Hub-Tones (Blue Note, 1962)
- Breaking Point! (Blue Note, 1964)
- Blue Spirits (Blue Note, 1964)
- The Night of the Cookers (Blue Note, 1965)
- Backlash (Atlantic, 1967)
- High Blues Pressure (Atlantic, 1967)
- The Black Angel (Atlantic, 1969)

With Bobby Hutcherson

- Components (Blue Note, 1965)
- Patterns (Blue Note, 1968)
- Ambos Mundos (Landmark, 1989)

With Abbey Lincoln

- It's Me (Verve, 2003)

With Hank Mobley

- A Slice of the Top (Blue Note)
- Third Season (Blue Note)

With Lee Morgan

- Standards (1967) (Blue Note)

With David Murray

- Hope Scope (Black Saint, 1987)
- David Murray Big Band (DIW/Columbia, 1991)
- Picasso (1993)
- Dark Star: The Music of the Grateful Dead (1996)
- Octet Plays Trane (1999)

With William Parker

- Wood Flute Songs (AUM Fidelity, 2013)

With Duke Pearson

- Wahoo! (Blue Note 1964)
- Honeybuns (Atlantic 1965)
- Prairie Dog (Atlantic 1966)
- Sweet Honey Bee (Blue Note 1966)
- The Right Touch (Blue Note 1967)

With Sam Rivers

- Dimensions & Extensions (1967)

With Max Roach

- Drums Unlimited (Atlantic, 1965)

With Pharoah Sanders

- Karma (1969)

With Woody Shaw

- Woody III (Columbia, 1979)
- For Sure! (Columbia, 1979)

With Wayne Shorter

- The Soothsayer (Blue Note 1965)
- The All Seeing Eye (Blue Note 1965)
- Schizophrenia (Blue Note 1967)

With Horace Silver

- The Jody Grind (Blue Note 1966)

With Sun Ra

- Visits Planet Earth (1957–1958)
- The Nubians of Plutonia (1958)
- Jazz in Silhouette (1959)
- Sound Sun Pleasure!! (1959)
- Somewhere Else (Rounder, 1988–89)
- Purple Night (A&M, 1990)

With Leon Thomas

- Spirits Known and Unknown (Flying Dutchman, 1969)
- The Leon Thomas Album (Flying Dutchman, 1970)

With Charles Tolliver

- The New Wave in Jazz (Impulse!, 1965)
- Impact (Strata-East, 1975)

With Stanley Turrentine

- The Return of the Prodigal Son (1967)
- Rough 'n' Tumble (Blue Note 1966)
- The Spoiler (Blue Note 1967)

With McCoy Tyner

- Tender Moments (Blue Note, 1968)

With Tyrone Washington

- Natural Essence (Blue Note 1967)

With Larry Young

- Of Love and Peace (Blue Note 1966)
