= Sun Ra discography =

The Sun Ra discography is one of the largest discographies in music history. Jazz keyboardist, bandleader and composer Sun Ra recorded dozens of singles and over one hundred full-length albums, comprising well over 1,000 songs, and making him one of the most prolific recording artists of the 20th century.

== History ==
His own El Saturn Records albums were usually printed in editions of 75 copies per album, and were sold primarily at live performances. Many of Sun Ra's early albums were recorded at home by Ra himself on wire or early tape recorders, and are decidedly lo-fi. Despite the technological limitations, Ra used some innovative recording techniques, and these recordings provided an unprecedented level of documentation, and were inspirational in showing how artists could take control of production and distribution of their works.

Prior to the 1970s, most of these albums were produced in Chicago through the "El Saturn Records Research" enterprise established by Ra and his colleague Alton Abraham, while later El Saturn Records were produced in Philadelphia. A batch of the most significant recordings were licensed to Impulse! Records in the mid-1970s. They were not as successful as hoped, and were deleted from the Impulse catalog, becoming available around the world as inexpensive "cut-outs" and making the music more widely available.

Most El Saturn Records were hand-decorated by Arkestra members, and these LP records sometimes sell for high prices among collectors. These El Saturn Records releases, dating from the 1950s to at least the late 1980s, typically had little or no information as to performers or recording dates, and sometimes didn't even list the songs on the album, often pressing one LP side from one era with another from a different decade, leading to some confusion among completists and fans.

After Sun Ra's death, many of his recordings were released on compact disc for the first time by Evidence Records, Ihnfinity Music, ESP Disk / ZYX Music, or Impulse!. As is the case with an artist whose output is so extensive, there is quite a bit of debate regarding his "best" albums. Of all these recordings, many critics and enthusiasts feel that the 1959 big band album Jazz in Silhouette is the best entry-point into his work, with The Penguin Guide to Jazz naming the album as part of a recommended "Core Collection" for any serious jazz fan and as "one of the most important jazz records since World War II."

== Albums ==
=== Studio albums ===
Year	Title	Credited artist	Label	Date recorded	Notes
1957	Jazz by Sun Ra	Sun Ra and His Arkestra	Transition	1956	AKA Sun Song
1957	Super-Sonic Jazz	Le Sun Ra and His Arkestra	El Saturn SR-LP 0216	1956	AKA Super-Sonic Sounds
1959	Jazz in Silhouette	Sun Ra and His Arkestra	El Saturn K7OP-3590	1959	reissued on as Saturn LP5786 in 1961
1962	The Futuristic Sounds of Sun Ra	Sun Ra and His Arkestra	Savoy	1961	AKA We Are In the Future
1963	When Sun Comes Out	Sun Ra and His Myth Science Arkestra	El Saturn LP 2066	1962?	
1965	Fate in a Pleasant Mood	Sun Ra and His Myth-Science Arkestra	Saturn Research LP-9956-2	1960	
1965	Secrets of the Sun	Sun Ra & His Solar Arkestra	El Saturn 9954	1962	
1965	Art Forms of Dimensions Tomorrow	Sun Ra and His Solar Arkestra	El Saturn LP No. 9956	1962	reissued El Saturn 404
1965	The Heliocentric Worlds of Sun Ra, Volume One	Sun Ra and His Solar Arkestra	ESP-Disk	1965	
1965	The Heliocentric Worlds of Sun Ra, Volume Two	Sun Ra and His Solar Arkestra	ESP-Disk	1965	
1966	Visits Planet Earth	Sun Ra and His Solar Arkestra	Saturn – LP No. 9956-11	1958	
1966	When Angels Speak of Love	Sun Ra and His Myth-Science Arkestra	El Saturn LP 1966	1963	
1966	Other Planes of There	Sun Ra and His Solar Arkestra	El Saturn KH-98766	1964	
1966	The Magic City	Sun Ra and His Solar Arkestra	Saturn Research – LPB - 711	1965	(partially?) live; reissued on Thoth Intergalactic, 403, 1969
1967	Angels and Demons at Play	Sun Ra and His Myth Science Arkestra	El Saturn 407	1956 & 1960	reissued by ABC/Impulse! in 1974
1967	Cosmic Tones for Mental Therapy	Sun Ra and His Myth Science Arkestra	El Saturn 408	1963	
1967	We Travel the Space Ways	Sun Ra and His Myth Science Arkestra	El Saturn LP #409	1961	
1967	Interstellar Low Ways	Sun Ra and His Myth Science Arkestra	EL Saturn LP-203	1960	AKA Rocket Number Nine
1967	Strange Strings	Sun Ra and His Astro-Infinity Arkestra	Saturn Research – 502	1965	
1968	Sound of Joy	Sun Ra and the Arkestra	Delmark	1956	
1969	The Nubians of Plutonia	Sun Ra and His Myth-Science Arkestra	El Saturn 406	1959	Originally released The Lady with the Golden Stockings (Saturn, SR 9956-11E/F, 1966); Sun Ra and His Solar Arkestra on LP label
1970	Atlantis	Sun Ra and His Astro-Infinity Arkestra	Saturn Research ESR507	1967–1969	reissued by ABC/Impulse! in 1973
1970	Holiday for Soul Dance	Sun Ra and His Astro-Infinity Arkestra	Saturn Research ESR-508	1960	
1973?	Monorails and Satellites	Sun Ra	Saturn Research SR-509	1966	
1970	Sound Sun Pleasure!!	Sun Ra and His Astro-Infinity Arkestra	El Saturn #512	1959	
1970	Continuation	Sun Ra and His Astro-Infinity Arkestra	El Saturn ESR 520	1968	
1970	My Brother the Wind	Sun Ra and His Astro-Infinity Arkestra	Saturn Research ESR521	1969	
1970	The Night of the Purple Moon	Sun Ra and His Intergalactic Infinity Arkestra	El Saturn IR 522	1970	Sun Ra and His Solar Arkestra on LP label
1971	My Brother the Wind, Vol. II: The Wind Speaks	Sun Ra and His Astro Infinity Arkestra	El Saturn SR-523	1969-1970	Sun Ra and His Intergalactic Infinity Arkestra on LP label
1971	The Solar-Myth Approach	Sun Ra and His Solar Myth Arkestra	BYG Actuel	1970–1971	2xLP; reissued 1972 as The Solar-Myth Approach, Vol. 1 and The Solar-Myth Approach, Vol. 2
1972	Universe in Blue	Sun Ra and His Blue Universe Arkestra	El Saturn ESR 200	1972	
1974?	Monorails and Satellites, Vol. 2	Sun Ra	El Saturn 519	1966	
1974?	A Tonal View of Times Tomorrow: Space Probe	Sun Ra and His Arkestra	El Saturn 527	1969–1970	
1972	Bad and Beautiful	Mr. Sun Ra and His Arkestra	El Saturn ESR532	1961	reissued by ABC/Impulse! in 1975
1973	Deep Purple	Sun Ra and His Arkestra Featuring Stuff Smith	El Saturn 485	1953–1973	AKA Dreams Come True
1973	Astro Black	Sun Ra	Impulse!/ABC	May 7, 1972	
1973	Space Is the Place	Sun Ra	Blue Thumb BTS 41	1972	
1973	Discipline 27-II	Sun Ra and His Astro Intergalactic Infinity Arkestra	El Saturn ES538	1972	
1974?	The Invisible Shield	Sun Ra and His Arkestra	El Saturn 529	1962–1970	AKA Janus; A Tonal View of Times Tomorrow, Vol. 2; Satellites are Outerspaces
1975	Pathways to Unknown Worlds	Sun Ra and His Astro Infinity Arkestra	ABC Impulse!	1973	reissue of Saturn 564
1975	What's New (Sub Underground Series)	The Sun Ra Arkestra	Saturn	1962 & 1975	
1976	Cosmos	Sun Ra	Cobra (France)	August 1976	issued in US on Inner City in 1977
1977-10-14	Some Blues But Not the Kind That's Blue	Sun Ra	El Saturn 747	1977	AKA My Favorite Things
1977	Solo Piano	Sun Ra	Improvising Artists	1977	
1978	New Steps	Sun Ra Quartet	Horo	1978	
1978	Other Voices, Other Blues	Sun Ra Quartet	Horo	1978	
1978	Visions	Sun Ra and Walt Dickerson	SteepleChase Records	1978	
1978	Lanquidity	Sun Ra	Philly Jazz	1978	
1979	The Other Side of the Sun	Sun Ra and His Arkestra	Sweet Earth	1978-1979	
1979-07-25	God Is More than Love Can Ever Be	Sun Ra Trio	Saturn 72579	1979	
1979-09-13	Omniverse	Sun Ra	El Saturn 91379	1979	
1979-10-16	On Jupiter	Sun Ra and His Arkestra	El Saturn 101679	1979	AKA Seductive Fantasy AKA UFO
1979	Sleeping Beauty	Sun Ra and His Arkestra	El Saturn	1979	AKA Door of the Cosmos
1980	Strange Celestial Road	Sun Ra	Rounder 3050	1979	
1981-10-04	Aurora Borealis	Sun Ra	El Saturn 10480	1980	
1983	A Fireside Chat with Lucifer	Sun Ra and His Outer Space Arkestra	Saturn Research B1984SG-9	1982	
1983	Just Friends	Sun Ra	El Saturn XI	1956-1982	
1984	Celestial Love	Sun Ra and His Outer Space Arkestra	El Saturn 19842	1982	
1984	Nuclear War	Sun Ra Arkestra	Y Records	1982	
1987	Reflections in Blue	Sun Ra Arkestra	Black Saint	1986	
1987	Hours After	Sun Ra Arkestra	Black Saint	1986	
1989	Out There a Minute	Sun Ra and His Arkestra	Blast First	1961–1970	
1989	Blue Delight	Sun Ra	A&M	1988	
1990	Mayan Temples	Sun Ra Arkestra	Black Saint	1990	
1990	Purple Night	Sun Ra	A&M	1989	
1993	Soundtrack to the Film Space Is the Place	Sun Ra and His Intergalactic Solar Arkestra	Evidence	1972	
1993	Somewhere Else	Sun Ra	Rounder	1988-1989	

=== Posthumous releases of studio material and rehearsals ===
Credited artist	Artist	Original Label(s)	Recorded	Release date & notes
Blue York	Sun Ra	Jeanne Dielman	1963	2014 as a bonus disc for the Continuation album re-release and 2016 as the Blue York Album. Previously unreleased recording from 1963
Heliocentric Worlds Vol. 3 (The Lost Tapes)	Sun Ra	ESP-Disk	1965	2005. Previously unreleased recording from the Heliocentric Worlds Volume II sessions
Other Strange Worlds	Sun Ra And His Astro-Infinity Arkestra	Roaratorio	1965	2014. Previously unreleased recording made in Sun Ra's apartment in New York City
Thunder of the Gods	Sun Ra and His Arkestra	Modern Harmonic	1966	2017. Previously unreleased live and studio recordings
Sun Embassy	Sun Ra And His Astro-Ihnfinity Arkestra	Roaratorio	1968–1969	2018. Archival recordings from the Sun Ra Philadelphia house, Sun Studios, from May 1968 to October 1969
The Intergalactic Thing	Sun Ra And His Astro-Ihnfinity Arkestra	Roaratorio	1969	2016. A dozen previously unreleased recordings from rehearsals at the Sun Ra Philadelphia house
Crystal Spears	Sun Ra	Evidence	1973	2000. Previously unreleased album which was planned for release and shelved by Impulse! in the 1970s
Cymbals	Sun Ra	Evidence	1973	2000. Previously unreleased album which was planned for release and shelved by Impulse! in the 1970s
Friendly Love	Sun Ra	Evidence	1973	2000. Previously unreleased album which was planned for release and shelved by Impulse! in the 1970s
Sign Of The Myth	Sun Ra And His Astro-Infinity Arkestra	Roaratorio	1973	2014. Previously unreleased Impulse! recordings from the Pathways To Unknown Worlds sessions
Dance of the Living Image: The Lost Reel Collection Volume 4	Sun Ra	Transparency	1974	2007. Previously unreleased reel-to-reel rehearsal sessions made in San Francisco
Untitled Recordings	Sun Ra	Transparency	1973-1985	2008. Live recording from 1985, Rehearsal from 1978 and jam from 1973
Of Abstract Dreams	Sun Ra	Strut	mid 1970s	2018. Previously unreleased session at WXPN in Philadelphia
Prophet	Sun Ra and His Arkestra	Modern Harmonic	1986-08-15	2022. Previously unreleased session at Mission Control Studios in Westford, Massachusetts with Sun Ra playing the Prophet VS (vector synthesizer)
Inside the Light World: Sun Ra Meets the OVC	Sun Ra	Strut	1986	2024. Multi-track session recorded for the Outer Space Visual Communicator videos and newly mixed
Uncharted Passages	Sun Ra	Modern Harmonic	1977 & 1979	2025. Solo piano from a live concert in 1977 and a studio session in 1979
East Two + 7	Sun Ra	Cosmic Myth	1972-1985	2026. Previously unreleased 1972-1973 studio sessions with live 80s bonus tracks

=== Live albums ===
Year	Title	Credited artist	Label	Recorded	Notes
2002	Music from Tomorrow's World: Chicago 1960	Sun Ra and His Arkestra	Atavistic	1960	
1976	Featuring Pharoah Sanders & Black Harold (aka Judson Hall, New York, December 31, 1964)	Sun Ra and His Arkestra	El Saturn	1964-12-31	
1966	Nothing Is	Sun Ra	ESP-Disk	1966-05	
2013	Space Aura	Sun Ra and His Band from Outer Space	Art Yard	1966	
1974	Outerspaceways Inc.	Sun Ra and his Astro-Intergalactic Research Arkestra	El Saturn	1966-1968	reissued as Spaceways
1971	Pictures of Infinity (aka Outer Spaceways Incorporated)	Sun Ra and His Arkestra	Black Lion Records	1966	
2009	Newport Jazz Festival - The Electric Circus	Sun Ra	Transparency	1968-1969	
2013	Live at the Red Garter	Sun Ra Arkestra	Transparency	1970	
1971	Nuits de la Fondation Maeght Volume 1	Sun Ra Arkestra	Shandar	1970-08-03 – 1970-08-05	
1971	Nuits de la Fondation Maeght Volume 2	Sun Ra Arkestra	Shandar	1970-08-03 – 1970-08-05	
2025	Nuits de la Fondation Maeght	Sun Ra and His Intergalactic Research Arkestra	Strut	1970-08-03 – 1970-08-05	6LP/4CD box set
1970	It's After the End of the World	Sun Ra and His Intergalactic Research Arkestra	MPS	1970-10-17; 1970-11-07	
1998	Black Myth/Out in Space	Sun Ra and His Intergalactic Research Arkestra	MPS Records/Motor Music	1970-10-17; 1970-11-07	
2010	Live in London	Sun Ra and the Intergalactic Research Arkestra	Transparency	1970-11-09	
2023	Paradiso Amsterdam 1970	Sun Ra and His Intergalactic Research Arkestra	Jazz in Paradiso	1970-11-18	
1972	Live in Egypt, Vol. I: Nature's God (Dark Myth Equation Visitation)	Sun Ra and His Astro Intergalactic Infinity Arkestra	El Saturn	1971	AKA Discipline 27
1972	Nidhamu	Sun Ra and His Astro Intergalactic Infinity Arkestra	El Saturn	1971	AKA Live in Egypt, Vol. II
1972	Horizon	Sun Ra and His Arkestra	El Saturn	1971	Recorded live in Egypt, 1971
2010	The Paris Tapes - Live at Le Theatre Du Chatlet 1971	Sun Ra and His Mythic Science Arkestra	Kindred Spirits / Art Yard	1971	
2009	Helsinki 1971	Sun Ra And His Intergalactic Solar Research Arkestra	Transparency	1971-10-14	
1998	Calling Planet Earth	Sun Ra	Freedom	1971-12-05	
2007	The Creator of the Universe (Lost Reel Collection Volume 1)	Sun Ra	Transparency	1971	includes Berkeley lecture on second disc
2007	Intergalactic Research (Lost Reel Collection Volume 2)	Sun Ra	Transparency	1971-1972	
2007	The Shadows Took Shape (Lost Reel Collection Volume 3)	Sun Ra	Transparency	early 1970s	
2008	Live at Slug's Saloon	Sun Ra	Transparency	1972	6CD box set
2016	I Roam the Cosmos	Sun Ra and His Solar Arkestra	Art Yard	1972	
1999	Life Is Splendid	Sun Ra and His Solar Myth Arkestra	Total Energy	1972	live at the Ann Arbor Blues and Jazz Festival 1972
2010	The Universe Sent Me (Lost Reel Collection Volume 5)	Sun Ra	Transparency	1972-1973	
1999	Outer Space Employment Agency	Sun Ra And His Intergalactic Arkestra	Total Energy	1973	live at the Ann Arbor Blues and Jazz Festival 1973
2006	What Planet Is This?	Sun Ra and His Space Arkestra	Leo	1973	
1993	Concert for the Comet Kohoutek	Sun Ra	ESP-Disk	1973	
1975	Live in Paris at the "Gibus"	Sun Ra	Atlantic Records	1973	
2015	Planets Of Life Or Death: Amiens '73	Sun Ra and His Intergalactic Research Arkestra	Strut	1973	
2010	The Road to Destiny (Lost Reel Collection Volume 6)	Sun Ra	Transparency	1973	
2001	It Is Forbidden	Sun Ra and His Intergalactic Arkestra	Total Energy	1974	live at the Ann Arbor Blue and Jazz Festival in Exile 1974
2011	Wake Up Angels	Sun Ra and His Solar Arkestra	Art Yard	1972-1974	live at the Ann Arbor Blues and Jazz Festivals 1972-1974
1974	Out Beyond the Kingdom Of	Sun Ra and His Outer Space Arkestra	El Saturn 61674	1974	
1974	The Antique Blacks	Sun Ra and His Arkestra	Saturn 81774	1974	
1974	Sub Underground	Sun Ra and His Arkestra	Saturn 92074	1974	
2009	Live in Cleveland	Sun Ra	Leo	1975	
1976	Live at Montreux	Sun Ra and His Arkestra	Inner City Records	1976	
1994	A Quiet Place in the Universe	Sun Ra and His Arkestra	Leo	1976	
2024	At The Showcase: Live in Chicago 1976-1977	Sun Ra	Jazz Detective	1976-1977	
1977	Taking a Chance on Chances	Sun Ra and His Arkestra	Saturn	1977	
1977	Somewhere Over the Rainbow	Sun Ra and His Arkestra	Saturn	1977	reissued by Strut 2026 in an expanded edition
1977	The Soul Vibrations of Man	Sun Ra and His Arkestra	Saturn	1977	
2016	In Some Far Place: Roma 1977	Sun Ra	Strut	1977	
1978	St. Louis Blues (solo piano)	Sun Ra	Improvising Artists	1977	
2003	Solo Piano Recital Teatro La Fenice	Sun Ra	Leo	1977	
1978	Unity	Sun Ra and His Arkestra	Horo	1977	
2006	Springtime in Chicago	The Sun Ra Arkestra	Leo	1978	
1978	Disco 3000	Sun Ra Quartet	El Saturn	1978	
1978	Media Dreams	Sun Ra Quartet	El Saturn	1978	
1978	The Sound Mirror	Sun Ra and His Arkestra	El Saturn	1978	
2024	Lights on a Satellite - Live at the Left Bank	Sun Ra	Resonance	1978	
2010	Live at the Horseshoe Tavern, Toronto 1978	Sun Ra	Transparency	1978	10 CD box set
1985	Outer Reach Intensity Energy	Sun Ra	El Saturn	1978-1983	
1980	Of Mythic Worlds	Sun Ra	Philly Jazz	1979	
1979	I, Pharaoh	Sun Ra and His Arkestra	El Saturn 6680	1979	
1994	Live from Soundscape	Sun Ra and His Arkestra	DIW Records	1979	
1980	Voice of the Eternal Tomorrow	Sun Ra and His Arkestra	El Saturn	1980	
2010	Live in Rome	Sun Ra	Transparency	1980-03-28	
1981	Sunrise in Different Dimensions	The Sun Ra Arkestra	Hathut Records	1980	
2007	The Complete Detroit Jazz Center Residency	Sun Ra And The Omniverse Jet Set Arkestra; Limited issue of 500 copies, 28-CD Box Set	Transparency	1980	
1981	Beyond the Purple Star Zone	Sun Ra And His Omniverse Jet-Set Arkestra	El Saturn 123180	1980	
1981	Dance of Innocent Passion	Sun Ra	El Saturn	1981	
1981	Oblique Parallax	primarily Sun Ra on keyboard	El Saturn SR72881	1980	
	The Sun Ra Arkestra Meets Salah Ragab In Egypt	The Sun Ra Arkestra / Salah Ragab / The Cairo Jazz Band	Leo	1983	
2008	Milan, Zurich, West Berlin, Paris	Sun Ra All Stars	Transparency	1983	5 CD box set
1983	Ra to the Rescue	Sun Ra	El Saturn		
1988	Love in Outer Space	Sun Ra and His Arkestra	Leo	1983	
1985	Hiroshima	The Sun Ra All Stars Band	Saturn	1983-1984	
1985	Cosmo Sun Connection	Sun Ra and His Arkestra	Saturn/ Recommended Records	1984	
2014	Live in Nickelsdorf 1984	The Sun Ra Arkestra	Trost	1984-03-11	
2023	Live At Mohren - March 25th 1984	Sun Ra and His Arkestra	De Occulta Records	1984-03-25	
	Live at Praxis '84	The Sun Ra Arkestra	Leo	1984	
2024	Excelsior Mill	Sun Ra	Modern Harmonic	1984-12-31	
2006	Live at Club Lingerie	The Sun Ra Arkestra	Transparency	1985	
2006	Live at Myron's Ballroom	The Sun Ra Arkestra	Transparency	1985	
1986	A Night in East Berlin	Sun Ra and His Cosmo Discipline Arkestra	Saturn	1986	
2019	Live In Kalisz 1986	Sun Ra Arkestra	Lanquidity Records	1986	
1987	John Cage Meets Sun Ra	Sun Ra and John Cage	Meltdown	1987	
1988	Cosmo Omnibus Imagiable Illusion	Sun Ra Arkestra	DIW	1988	
1988	Hidden Fire 1	Sun Ra	Saturn 13188III / 12988II	1988	live at Knitting Factory, NYC
1988	Hidden Fire 2	Sun Ra	Saturn 13088A / 12988B	1988	live at Knitting Factory, NYC
2018	Pine Street Theatre, October 28th 1988	Sun Ra And His Cosmo Love Adventure Arkestra	Jackpot	1988-10-28	
1995	Second Star to the Right (Salute to Walt Disney)	Sun Ra & His Intergalactic Arkestra	Leo	1989-04-29	
1997	Stardust from Tomorrow	Sun Ra & His Intergalaxtic Arkestra	Leo	1989-04-29	
1990	Live London 1990	Sun Ra and His Year 2000 Myth Science Arkestra	Blast First	1990	
1994	Live at the Hackney Empire	Sun Ra And The Year 2000 Myth Science Arkestra	Leo	1990	
1993	Pleiades	Sun Ra and His Arkestra	Leo Records	1990	
1993	At the Village Vanguard	Sun Ra Sextet	Rounder	1991	
1993	Friendly Galaxy	Sun Ra Arkestra	Leo	1991	
2016-11-25	At Inter-Media Arts, April 1991	Sun Ra and His Arkestra	Modern Harmonic	1991-04-20	
1992	Destination Unknown	Sun Ra & His Omniverse Arkestra	Enja Records	1992	
2023	Haverford College 1980 Solo Piano	Sun Ra	Modern Harmonic	1980-01-25	solo Rhodes piano

=== Posthumous compilations ===
Recorded	Released	Album	Credited artist	Original Label(s)
1954-1982	1996	The Singles	Sun Ra	Evidence
1956–1973	2000	Greatest Hits: Easy Listening for Intergalactic Travel	Sun Ra and His Arkestra	Evidence
1955–1956	2007	Toward The Stars - Pioneering In 1955-56	Sun Ra	FiveFour
	2009	Interplanetary Melodies	Sun Ra and His Arkestra	Norton
	2009	The Second Stop Is Jupiter	Sun Ra and His Arkestra	Norton
	2009	Rocket Ship Rock	Sun Ra and His Arkestra	Norton
	2014	In the Orbit of Ra	Sun Ra and His Arkestra	Strut
	2015	To Those of Earth... And Other Worlds	Sun Ra and His Arkestra	Strut
1952–1961	2016-11-25	Singles: The Definitive 45s Collection, Vol. 1—1952–1961	Sun Ra	Strut
1962-1991	2017-04-26	Singles: The Definitive 45s Collection, Vol. 2 — 1962-1991)	Sun Ra	Strut
	2017-11-24	Exotica	Sun Ra	Modern Harmonic
1958–1985	2018-03-27	The Space Age Is Here To Stay	Sun Ra and His Interplanetary Vocal Arkestra	Modern Harmonic/Sundazed Music
	2019-11-29	Saturnian Queen of the Sun Ra Arkestra	June Tyson	Modern Harmonic
	2024-04-20	Pink Elephants on Parade	Sun Ra	Modern Harmonic
	2024	Kingdom of Discipline	Sun Ra	Dead Currencies
	2025-04-12	Stray Voltage	Sun Ra	Modern Harmonic
	2026-06-12	Do The Impossible: Original Soundtrack to the Documentary	Sun Ra	Modern Harmonic

=== Singles ===
Year	Title	Credited Artist	Label	Recorded	Notes
2009	I Am Strange / I am an Instrument	Sun Ra	Norton 45-153	1952-1962	
2005	Chicago USA / Spaceship Lullaby	Sun Ra with Nu Sounds	Stop Smiling	1955	
1983	Daddy's Gonna Tell You No Lie (demo) / A Foggy Day	The Cosmic Rays / The Nu Sounds	El Saturn SATURN 9	1954-1959	
1956	I'm Coming Home / Last Call for Love	Billie Hawkins with Sun Ra and his Orchestra	Heartbeat	1956	
1956	Soft Talk / Super Blonde	Sun Ra and his Arkestra	Saturn Z1111	1956	
1956	Saturn / Call For All Demons	Le Sun Ra and his Arkistra	Saturn G7OW5257/G7OW5259	1956	
1956	Medicine for a Nightmare / Urnack	Le Sun Ra and his Arkistra	Saturn G7OW5258/G7OW5261, Z222	1956	
1961	Happy New Year to You! /It's Christmas Time	The Qualities	Saturn M08W4052/3	1956-1961	
1950s	Muck Muck / Hot Skillet Mama	Yochanan (The Space Age Vocalist)	Saturn 4236/4237	1957?	
1958	Bye Bye / Somebody's In Love	The Cosmic Rays with Sun Ra	Saturn 222/223	1958	
1958	Hours After / Great Balls of Fire	Le Sun Ra and his Arkestra	Saturn J08W0245/6	1958	
1967	Adventur in Space / October	Sun Ra and his Astro-Infinity Arkestra	Saturn 874	1956-1959	
1960	Dreaming / Daddy's Gonna Tell You No Lie	The Cosmic Rays with Sun Ra and Arkestra	Saturn SR-401/SR-402	1959	
1961	The Sun One / Message to Earthman	Yochannon with Sun Ra and his Arkestra	Saturn 1502	1960?	
1960	Space Loneliness / State Street	Sun Ra and his Arkestra	Saturn L08W-0114/0115	1960	
1960	The Blue Set / Big City Blues	Sun Ra and his Arkestra	Saturn SA-1001	1960	
1964-1965	A Blue One / Orbitration in Blue	Sun Ra and His Arkestra featuring Pat Patrick on the baritone sax	Saturn SRA999	1962	
1989	Out There a Minute on The Devil's Jukebox 10x7"	Sun Ra	Blast First BFDJ 1-10	1962-1964	
1960s	Tell Her to Come Home / I'm Making Believe	Little Mack	Saturn 144M	1962	
1968	The Bridge / Rocket Number Nine	Sun Ra and his Outer Space Arkestra	El Saturn 3066	1967	
1969	Blues on Planet Mars / Saturn Moon	Sun Ra and his Astro-Solar Infinity Arkestra	Saturn 911	1968	
1973?	Journey to Saturn / Enlightenment	Sun Ra and his Astro-Intergalactic Infinity Arkestra	Saturn ES 538	1970-1974?	
1973-1974	I'm Gonna Unmask the Batman / The Perfect Man	Sun Ra	Saturn ES 537		
1975	Love in Outer Space / Mayan Temple	Sun Ra	Saturn 256/62775	1975	
1982	Quest / Outer Space Plateau	Sun Ra & his Outer Space Arkestra	Saturn SUN-RA 1982 Z	1977&1982	
1978	Disco 2100 / Sky Blues	Sun Ra	Saturn 2100	1978	
1979	Rough House Blues / Cosmo Extensions	Sun Ra	Saturn SR51879	1979	
1982	Nuclear War / Sometimes I'm Happy	Sun Ra	Y Records RA1	1982	
2014	Prophetika	Sun Ra	Norton 1901	1978-1979	
1988	Queer Notions / Prelude No. 7	Sun Ra	DIW DEP 1-1	1988	
1988	East of the Sun / Frisco Fog	Sun Ra	DIW DEP 1-2	1988	
1988	Opus Springtime / Cosmo Swing Blues	Sun Ra	DIW DEP 1-3	1988	
1994	I am the Instrument	Sun Ra	Blast First BFFP CD101	1991	

=== Related ===
Recorded	Album	Credited artist	Original Label(s)
1954–1960	Spaceship Lullaby: Chicago 1954-60	Sun Ra/the Vocal Groups featuring Nu Sounds, the Unitels & the Cosmic Rays	Atavistic
1966	Impressions of a Patch of Blue	Walt Dickerson Quartet with Sun Ra on harpsichord	MGM
1966	Batman and Robin - The Sensational Guitars of Dan and Dale	Uncredited, but featuring Sun Ra & members of the Arkestra and the Blues Project	Tifton
1968	A Black Mass	Imamu Amiri Baraka with Sun Ra and His Myth Science Arkestra	Jihad Productions
1986	Un "Sung Stories"	Phil Alvin featuring Sun Ra & his Arkesta on three tracks	Slash
1988	Stay Awake: Various Interpretations of Music from Vintage Disney Films	Sun Ra & His Arkestra perform "Pink Elephants On Parade" from Dumbo	A&M Records
1992	A Tribute to Stuff Smith	Billy Bang with Sun Ra, John Ore and Andrew Cyrille	Soul Note
2013	ARTPOP	Writing credit with Lady Gaga for the song "Venus"	Interscope
2023	Red Hot & Ra: Nuclear War, (A Tribute to Sun Ra: Volume 1)	Georgia Anne Muldrow, Josef Leimberg, Angel Bat Dawid, Malcolm Jiyane Tree-o, Grandmaster CAP	Red Hot Organization
2023	Red Hot + Ra: Solar – Sun Ra in Brasil, (A Tribute to Sun Ra: Volume 2)	Xuxa Levy, Orquestra Afrosinfônica, Jazzmeia Horn, Munir Hossn, Meshell Ndegeocello, Metá Metá, Edgar, Fabrício Boliveira, Edbrass Brasil, Xênia França, Tiganá Santana, Hamilton de Holanda Trio, Max de Castro, BNegão, Orchestra Klaxon	Red Hot Organization
2024	Red Hot + Ra: The Magic City, (A Tribute to Sun Ra: Volume 3)	Meshell Ndegeocello	Red Hot Organization
2024	Red Hot + Ra: Outer Spaceways Incorporated (A Tribute to Sun Ra: Volume 4) (2024)	Kronos Quartet, Marshall Allen, Laurie Anderson, Jlin, Laraaji, RP Boo, 700 Bliss, Armand Hammer, Terry Riley	Red Hot Organization
