= 1961 in jazz =

- Decade: 1960s in jazz
- Music: 1961 in music
- Standards: List of post-1950 jazz standards
- See also: 1960 in jazz – 1962 in jazz

This is a timeline documenting events of jazz in the year 1961.

== Events ==
=== June ===
- 25 – The Bill Evans Trio records Sunday at the Village Vanguard and Waltz for Debby during a two-week stay at The Village Vanguard in New York. The recording was made from five sets they played on June 25 and was the last time the trio would play before virtuoso bassist Scott LaFaro's death 10 days later.
- 30 – The 7th Newport Jazz Festival started in Newport, Rhode Island (June 30 – July 3).

=== August ===
- 4 – The very first Moldejazz started in Molde, Norway (August 4 – 6).

=== November ===
- 1 – John Coltrane begins recording his first live record Live! at the Village Vanguard.

=== Unknown dates ===
- Bengali Indian sitar player and composer Ravi Shankar and western jazz musicians Gary Peacock and Bud Shank collaborate on the album Improvisations. The album combines the use of sitar and jazz music and is considered an early example of fusion experiments with jazz and Indian classical music. In early 1961 John Coltrane begins listening to North Indian music and the music of Shankar becomes influential in his development as a musician.
- John Coltrane sells an estimated 30,000 copies of My Favorite Things in its first year of release.

== Album releases ==
- Basie at Birdland – Count Basie Orchestra (Roulette)
- A Jazz Hour with Art Blakey's Jazz Messengers: Blues March – Art Blakey (Movieplay)
- Mosaic – Art Blakey (Blue Note)
- Time Further Out – The Dave Brubeck Quartet (Columbia)
- Con Alma – Ray Bryant (Columbia)
- Free Jazz: A Collective Improvisation – Ornette Coleman (Atlantic)
- Coltrane Jazz – John Coltrane (Atlantic)
- Olé Coltrane – John Coltrane (Atlantic)
- My Favorite Things – John Coltrane (Atlantic)
- Whistle Stop – Kenny Dorham (Blue Note)
- American Freedom – Duke Ellington & Louis Armstrong (Blue Note)
- Out of the Cool – Gil Evans Orchestra (Impulse!)
- Focus – Stan Getz (Verve)
- 1961 – Jimmy Giuffre 3 (ECM)
- Eastern Sounds – Yusef Lateef (Moodsville)
- Out Front – Booker Little (Candid)
- Kenton's West Side Story – Stan Kenton (Capitol) – Grammy winning album
- Mingus – Charles Mingus (Candid Records)
- Oh Yeah – Charles Mingus (Atlantic Records)
- All the Sad Young Men (album) – Anita O'Day (Verve)
- The Futuristic Sounds of Sun Ra – Sun Ra and his Arkestra (Savoy Records)
- We Are In the Future – Sun Ra and his Arkestra (Savoy Records)
- We Travel the Spaceways – Sun Ra and his Myth Science Arkestra
- Secrets of the Sun – by Sun Ra and his Solar Arkestra (El Saturn Records)
- Cosmic Tones for Mental Therapy – Sun Ra and his Myth Science Arkestra
- Bad and Beautiful – Sun Ra and his Myth Science Arkestra (El Saturn Records, Impulse!)
- Fate in a Pleasant Mood – Sun Ra and his Myth Science Arkestra (El Saturn Records, Impulse!)
- Percussion Bitter Sweet – Max Roach (Impulse!)
- Forbidden Fruit – Nina Simone (Colpix)

== Deaths ==
February

- 4 – Alphonse Picou, American clarinetist and composer (born 1878).
- 7 – Noah Lewis, American harmonica player (born 1891).
- 22 – Nick LaRocca, New Orleans cornetist and trumpeter (born 1889).

March

- 6 – George Formby, English actor, singer-songwriter, and comedian (born 1904).
- 9 – Wilber Sweatman, American clarinetist (born 1882).
- 24 – Freddy Johnson, American pianist and singer (born 1904).

April

- 29 – Miff Mole, American trombonist and bandleader (born 1898).

July

- 6 – Scott LaFaro, American upright bassist (born 1936).

August

- 15 – Stick McGhee, American guitarist (born 1918).

October

- 5 – Booker Little American trumpeter and composer (born 1938).

Unknown date

- Cuba Austin, American drummer (born 1906).

== Births ==
January

- 12 – Ivo Perelman, Brazilian saxophonist.
- 16 – Kenneth Sivertsen, Norwegian composer and guitarist (died 2006).
- 18 – Bobby Broom, American guitarist, composer, and educator.

February

- 5 – Clark Tracey, British drummer, band leader, and composer.
- 9 – Steve Wilson, American saxophonist and multi-instrumentalist.
- 10 – Paolo Fresu, Italian trumpeter, flugelhornist, composer, and arranger.
- 12 – Knut Reiersrud, Norwegian guitarist.
- 21 – Mike Nielsen, Irish guitarist, composer, and educator.

March

- 2 – Harald Dahlstrøm, Norwegian pianist.
- 5 – Marcelo Peralta, Argentine saxophones, piano, accordion, the Latin American aerophones, and composer.
- 14 – Joe Ascione, American drummer (died 2016).
- 23 – Eivind Aarset, Norwegian guitarist.
- 25 – Makoto Ozone, Japanese pianist.
- 27 – Tak Matsumoto, Japanese guitarist, producer, arranger, composer, singer and songwriter.
- 29 – Ken Stubbs, English alto saxophonist, and composer.
- 30 – Tina May, English singer.
- 31 – Mark Lockheart, British tenor saxophonist, Loose Tubes.

April

- 9 – Chris Abrahams, New Zealand pianist and composer.
- 23 – Gene Calderazzo, American drummer.
- 25
  - Carl Allen, American drummer.
  - Paul Wagnberg, Swedish–Norwegian organist and keyboarder.
- 30 – Alan Steward, Dutch record producer and multi-instrumentalist.

May

- 5 – Flavio Boltro, Italian trumpeter and flugelhornist.
- 11 – Brian Simpson, American pianist.
- 17 – Enya, Irish singer-songwriter.
- 21 – Rachelle Ferrell, American vocalist.
- 24 – Jarmo Savolainen, Finnish pianist and composer (died 2009).
- 27 - Ivan Božičević, Croatian composer, pianist, and organist.

June

- 4 – El DeBarge, American singer-songwriter.
- 10 – Gary Thomas, American saxophonist.
- 15
  - Kai Eckhardt, German bass guitarist.
  - Miguel "Angá" Díaz, Cuban percussionist (died 2006).
- 18 – Alison Moyet, British singer-songwriter.
- 24 – Marvin Smith, American drummer and composer.

July

- 7 – Leon Bosch, South African upright bassist.
- 8 – Karl Seglem, Norwegian saxophonist and goat horn player.
- 26 – Keiko Matsui, Japanese pianist and composer.
- 29 – Michael Publig, Austrian pianist and composer.

August

- 3 – Art Porter Jr., American saxophonist (died 1996).
- 13 – Koji Kondo, Japanese composer, pianist, and sound director.
- 17 – Everette Harp, American saxophonist.
- 23 – Anita Wardell, English singer.

September

- 1 – Boney James, American saxophonist, songwriter, and producer.
- 7 – LeRoi Moore, American saxophonist (Dave Matthews Band) (died 2008).
- 22 – Kofi Burbridge, American keyboardist and flautist, Tedeschi Trucks Band (died 2019).
- 29 – David Kikoski, American pianist.

October

- 10 – Jonathan Butler, South African singer-songwriter and guitarist.
- 11 – Xavier Desandre Navarre, French percussionist and drummer.
- 18 – Bo Sundström, Swedish singer and songwriter, Bo Kaspers orkester.
- 18 – Wynton Marsalis, American trumpeter.
- 20
  - Audun Kleive, Norwegian drummer.
  - David Becker, American guitarist.
- 25 – Franck Amsallem, French-American pianist, arranger, composer, and singer.
- 27 – Igor Butman, Russian saxophonist.

November

- 13 – Candye Kane, American singer and entertainer (pancreatic cancer) (died 2016).
- 19 – Mornington Lockett, English saxophonist.

December

- 5 – Anders Bergcrantz, Swedish trumpeter.
- 24 – Ralph Bowen, Canadian saxophonist.
- 29 – Lê Quan Ninh, French percussionist.

Unknown date

- Paul Hanmer, South African composer and pianist.

== Awards ==
- Grammy Awards of 1961
  - Best Jazz Performance Solo or Small Group
    - André Previn for West Side Story
  - Best Jazz Performance Large Group
    - Henry Mancini for Blues and the Beat
  - Best Jazz Composition of More Than Five Minutes Duration
    - Gil Evans & Miles Davis for Sketches of Spain

== Music criticism ==
- Dan Morgenstern, Jazz Journal (1958–1961), Metronome (1961)

== See also ==
- 1960s in jazz
- List of years in jazz
- 1961 in music

== Bibliography ==
- Ratliff, Ben (2007). Coltrane: The Story of a Sound. New York: Farrar, Straus and Giroux. ISBN 978-0-374-12606-3.
- The New Real Book, Volume I. Sher Music. 1988. ISBN 0-9614701-4-3.
- The New Real Book, Volume II. Sher Music. 1991. ISBN 0-9614701-7-8.
- The New Real Book, Volume III. Sher Music. 1995. ISBN 1-883217-30-X.
- The Real Book, Volume I (6th ed.). Hal Leonard. 2004. ISBN 0-634-06038-4.
- The Real Book, Volume II (2nd ed.). Hal Leonard. 2007. ISBN 978-1-4234-2452-9.
- The Real Book, Volume III (2nd ed.). Hal Leonard. 2006. ISBN 0-634-06136-4.
- The Real Jazz Book. Warner Bros. ISBN 978-91-85041-36-7.
- The Real Vocal Book, Volume I. Hal Leonard. 2006. ISBN 0-634-06080-5.
