= Holiday for Soul Dance =

Studio album by Sun Ra and His Astro-Infinity Arkestra
- Released: 1970
- Recorded: 1960 Chicago
- Genre: Jazz
- Length: 31:59
- Label: Saturn Research; Evidence
- Producer: Alton Abraham

Sun Ra and His Astro-Infinity Arkestra chronology
Fate In A Pleasant Mood (1960)	Holiday for Soul Dance (1970)	Angels and Demons at Play (1956-60)

Professional ratings
Review scores
Source	Rating
AllMusic	4/5 stars
The Penguin Guide to Jazz Recordings	3.5/4 stars

Holiday for Soul Dance is an album by the American jazz musician Sun Ra and His Astro-Infinity Arkestra recorded in Chicago, mid-1960 and originally released on his own Saturn label in 1970. The album was reissued by Evidence on Compact disc in 1992.

== Background and recording history ==
Within Ra's catalogue, Holiday For Soul Dance is considered a bit of an oddity as it lacks any tracks written by Sun Ra, although a song written by Phil Cohran, the Arkestra's cornet player, is included. The record is one of a trio of albums recorded between 1959 and 1961, featuring jazz standards, that Ra released in the early 1970s. The others were Sound Sun Pleasure!! (recorded 1959 and also released in 1970) and Bad and Beautiful (recorded 1961 and released in 1972).

The album was one of five to include songs recorded in a marathon recording session around June 17, 1960 at the RCA Studios, Chicago (or possibly at Hall Recording Co, also Chicago). The other four were Interstellar Low Ways, Fate in a Pleasant Mood, Angels and Demons at Play and We Travel The Space Ways.

== Track listing ==
=== 12" Vinyl ===
Side A:

1. "But Not for Me" (Gershwin) - (4.11)
2. "Day by Day" (Cahn, Stordahl, Weston) - (3.40)
3. "Holiday for Strings" (Rose, Gallo) - (4.09)
4. "Dorothy's Dance" (Cohran) - (3.19)

Side B:

1. "Early Autumn" (Herman, Mercer, Burns) - (4.53)
2. "I Loves You Porgy" (Gershwin, Gershwin, Heyward) - (3.35)
3. "Body and Soul" (Green, Heyman, Sour, Eyton) - (6.00)
4. "Keep Your Sunny Side Up" (DeSylva, Brown) - (2.12)

== Musicians ==
- Sun Ra - Percussion, Bells, Gong and Piano
- Phil Cohran - Cornet
- Nate Pryor - Trombone and Bells
- John Gilmore - Tenor Sax and Clarinet, percussion
- Marshall Allen - Alto Sax, Flute, Bells
- Ronnie Boykins - Bass
- Jon Hardy - Drums
- Ricky Murray - Vocals on Early Autumn

Recorded at RCA Studios, Chicago, around 17 June 1960, except "Early Autumn", recorded during rehearsals at the Wonder Inn, Chicago, around the same time.

== See also ==
Sun Ra Discography
