= We Travel the Space Ways =

Studio album by Sun Ra and his Myth Science Arkestra
- Released: 1967
- Recorded: 1956–1961, Chicago
- Genre: Jazz
- Length: 23:45
- Label: Saturn; Evidence
- Producer: Alton Abraham

Sun Ra and his Myth Science Arkestra chronology
| Angels and Demons at Play (1956) | We Travel the Space Ways (1967) | The Futuristic Sounds of Sun Ra (1961) |

Professional ratings
Review scores
| Source | Rating |
|---|---|
| AllMusic (LP) | 4/5 stars |
| AllMusic (CD) | 4/5 stars |
| The Rolling Stone Jazz & Blues Album Guide (CD) | 5/5 stars |

We Travel the Space Ways is an album by the American jazz musician Sun Ra and his Myth Science Arkestra. Recorded mostly in 1960, the album was released in 1967, on Sun Ra's own label Saturn. The album brings together a number of eras and personnel of the Arkestra, and was probably mostly recorded by Ra himself during rehearsals.

The earliest recording, "New Horizons", was recorded at Balkan Studio, Chicago, April 13, 1956, and predates the version on Jazz by Sun Ra. "Velvet" was recorded at the end of the session at RCA Studios, Chicago, around June 17, 1960, that yielded over 30 recordings spread across five albums (Fate in a Pleasant Mood, Holiday for Soul Dance, Angels and Demons at Play, We Travel the Space Ways and Interstellar Low Ways). "Eve" and "Space Loneliness" were recorded at the Pershing Lounge, Chicago, July 13, 1961. The rest were recorded at various rehearsals in 1960. The mechanical sound at the end of the title track comes from a toy robot:

"The bizarre whirring and quacking heard at the end of “We Travel the Spaceways” comes from a toy robot with flashing lights; John Gilmore told John Corbett that around this time the Arkestra would release the “robots” into the audience during their performances. The band also used mechanical “flying saucers” as props".

When the album was re-issued on CD by Evidence, it was coupled with the whole of the 1961 album Bad & Beautiful, Ra's first recording for Saturn after arriving in New York.

== Track listing ==
=== 12" Vinyl ===
All songs were written by Sun Ra.
Side A:

1. "Interplanetary Music" - (2:41)
2. "Eve" - (3:08)
3. "We Travel the Space Ways" - (3:23)
4. "Tapestry from an Asteroid" - (2:07)

Side B:

1. "Space Loneliness" - (4:49)
2. "New Horizons" - (3:01)
3. "Velvet" - (4:36)

The album includes a number of alternative versions of songs that also appear - usually in better quality recordings - on other early Saturn albums; "Interplanetary Music" and "Space Loneliness" appear on Interstellar Low Ways; "Eve" is also on Sun Ra and his Solar Arkestra Visits Planet Earth; "We Travel the Space Ways" from When Sun Comes Out; "Tapestry from an Asteroid" from The Futuristic Sounds of Sun Ra on Savoy Records; "New Horizons" from Jazz by Sun Ra; and "Velvet" which appears on Jazz In Silhouette. All of these records had already been released by the time We Travel the Space Ways was produced.

== Musicians ==
- Sun Ra
- Phil Cohran
- Marshall Allen
- George Hudson
- John Gilmore
- William Strickland
- Art Hoyle
- Julian Priester
- James Scales
- Wilburn Green
- Pat Patrick
- Ronnie Boykins
- Robert Barry
- Jon Hardy
- William Cochran
- Dick Griffin

== See also ==
Sun Ra Discography
