= Early Autumn (song) =

1947 song by Ralph Burns, Woody Herman & Johnny Mercer

Song
- Written: Johnny Mercer
- Genre: Jazz
- Composers: Ralph Burns; Woody Herman
- Lyricist: Johnny Mercer

"Early Autumn" is a song composed by Ralph Burns and Woody Herman with lyrics by Johnny Mercer. The song grew out of the fourth segment of Burns's "Summer Sequence" concert piece. The original recording was made by Herman's second herd on December 27, 1947, which had a notable eight-bar solo by saxophonist Stan Getz. Herman asked Johnny Mercer to write lyrics in 1952 and he re-recorded the song taking the vocal duties himself.

Woody Herman and Jo Stafford recorded versions of the song that both charted in the US in 1952.

== Notable covers ==
- Woody Herman — instrumental version (1949).
- Woody Herman — single release in 1952 for the Mars label (catalog No. 300).
- Billy Eckstine (1952)
- Ted Heath and His Music, vocal by Lita Roza (1952).
- Jo Stafford — single version that peaked at #25 on the Billboard singles chart.
- Ella Fitzgerald – a single release for Decca Records (catalog No. 29810) in 1956 (recorded in 1952)
- Sun Ra and his Intergalactic Arkestra featuring vocalist Ricky Murray (recorded in 1960 and released on Holiday for Soul Dance on Ra's El Saturn Records in 1970)
- Ella Fitzgerald – new version for her album Ella Fitzgerald Sings the Johnny Mercer Songbook (1964)
- Johnny Mathis – Wonderful, Wonderful (1957)
- Anita O'Day - Anita O'Day Sings the Winners (1958)
- Stan Getz – Stan Getz & Strings (1960)
- Cleo Laine - I Am a Song (RCA Victor, 1973)
- Anita Kerr Singers – Round Midnight (1975)
- Patricia Barber - Split (1989
- Mel Tormé – Night at the Concord Pavilion (1990)
- Diana Krall - included on the Mark Whitfield album Forever Love (1997).
- The Four Freshmen – In Session (2005).
- Patti LuPone – The Lady with the Torch (2006).
- Guy Marchand – A guy in blue (2008) (as "Finalement l'automne est arrivé ").
- St. Vincent (feat. The Living Sisters) – Gangster Squad: Music from and Inspired by the Motion Picture (2013).

== Personnel ==
Personnel on the 1947 recording were:

- Stan Fishelson — trumpet
- Bernie Glow — trumpet
- Marky Markowitz — trumpet
- Ernie Royal — trumpet
- Shorty Rogers — trumpet
- Earl Swope — trombone
- Ollie Wilson — trombone
- Bob Swift — trombone
- Woody Herman — clarinet
- Jimmy Giuffre — clarinet
- Sam Marowitz — alto saxophone
- Herbie Steward — tenor saxophone
- Stan Getz — tenor saxophone
- Zoot Sims — tenor saxophone
- Serge Chaloff — baritone saxophone
- Ralph Burns — piano
- Walt Yoder — bass
- Terry Gibbs — vibraphone
- Don Lamond — drums
