= Afterschool Sound Records =

- Parent company: El Saturn Records
- Founded: 2007
- Founder: Robert Chan
- Genre: Various
- Country of origin: US
- Location: New York, New York
- Official website: Official Website of Afterschool Sound Records

Afterschool Sound Records is the name of an American record label. The label operates on behalf of El Saturn Records and features a number of artists from the University of Chicago.

== See also ==
- Lists of record labels
