= Fate in a Pleasant Mood =

Album by Sun Ra

Fate In A Pleasant Mood

Studio album by Sun Ra and his Myth Science Arkestra
- Released: 1965
- Recorded: 1960 Chicago
- Genre: Jazz
- Length: 25:57 (LP); 30:10 (digital)
- Label: Saturn; Impulse! Evidence
- Producer: Alton Abraham

Sun Ra and his Myth Science Arkestra chronology
Interstellar Low Ways (1959-60)	Fate In A Pleasant Mood (1965)	Holiday for Soul Dance (1960)

Professional ratings
Review scores
Source	Rating
AllMusic	3.5/5 stars

Fate in a Pleasant Mood is an album by the American jazz musician Sun Ra and his Myth Science Arkestra recorded in Chicago, mid 1960 and originally released on his own Saturn label in 1965. The album was reissued by Impulse! in 1974, and by Evidence (on CD) in 1993. For the latter reissue, the record was included as the first half of a CD that also featured the whole of When Sun Comes Out, an album recorded by the Arkestra in New York, 1963.

== Alternative test pressing ==
Most of the tracks were recorded at a marathon session of between 30 and 40 songs, either at the RCA Studios or possibly at Hall Recording Company (both in Chicago), around June 17, 1960. Other albums to include tracks from the session include Interstellar Low Ways, Holiday for Soul Dance, Angels and Demons at Play and We Travel the Space Ways. An early white label version of the album - including other songs that ended up on Holiday for Soul Dance - was found in a Montréal record store by François Lamarche many years later;

'The test pressing was made at Sheldon Recording Studios (a.k.a. the Chess studios in Chicago) and titled simply, Music of the Future by Sun Ra Arkestra. Side A contained “Space Mates,” “But Not for Me,” and “The Others in There [sic] World.” Side B had “Lights on the [sic] Satellite,” “Day by Day,” “Ankhnaton,” and “Holiday for Strings.” The pressing contains Alton Abraham's home address at 4115 South Drexel and gives a Montréal address and phone number for Sun Ra. It was therefore cut in August or September 1961. However, the Arkestra's relocation to New York disrupted the plan. Saturn did not actually issue any LPs from this session till 1965, and when they began to appear, the tracks had been redistributed.

== Release of the session ==
After having released three albums in the previous eight years - Super-Sonic Jazz (1957), Jazz in Silhouette (1959) and When Sun Comes Out (1963) - Saturn released four albums in 1965. Along with Fate In A Pleasant Mood, Angels and Demons at Play (recorded 1956–60), Art Forms of Dimensions Tomorrow (recorded 1961–62) and Secrets of the Sun (recorded 1962) were all released this year. ESP also released The Heliocentric Worlds of Sun Ra, Volume One at the same time.

== Track listing ==
=== 12" Vinyl ===
All songs were written by Sun Ra unless otherwise noted.
Side A:

1. "The Others in their World" - (2:15)
2. "Space Mates" - (7:10)
3. "Lights on a Satellite" - (3:39)

Side B:

1. "Distant Stars" (Ra, Boykins) - (2:54)
2. "Kingdom of Thunder" (Ra, Allen) - (3:50)
3. "Fate in a Pleasant Mood" - (2:44)
4. "Ankhnaton" - (3:25)

=== Digital reissue (2014) ===
1. "The Others in their World" - (2:20)
2. "Space Mates" - (7:15)
3. "Lights on a Satellite" - (3:40)
4. "Distant Stars" (Ra, Boykins) - (2:58)
5. "Kingdom of Thunder" (Ra, Allen) - (3:55)
6. "Fate in a Pleasant Mood" - (2:46)
7. "Ankhnaton" - (3:28)
8. "Lights on a Satellite" [single version] – (3:49)

== Musicians ==
The original sleeve credits the following musicians;

- Sun Ra - Piano
- Phil Cohran - Trumpet
- George Hudson - Trumpet
- John Gilmore - Tenor Sax
- Marshall Allen - Alto Sax
- Ronnie Boykins - Bass
- Eddy Skinner - Drums

According to Sun Ra's discographer Robert Campbell, however, the five tracks recorded at the RCA Studios - "The Others in Their World", "Space Mates", "Lights On A Satellite", "Fate in a Pleasant Mood" and "Ankhnaton" - featured a slightly different line-up;

- Sun Ra - Percussion, Bells, Gong and Piano
- Phil Cohran - Cornet
- Nate Pryor - Trombone and Bells
- John Gilmore - Tenor Sax and Clarinet, percussion
- Marshall Allen - Alto Sax, Flute, Bells
- Ronnie Boykins - Bass
- Jon Hardy - Drums

According to Campbell, "Kingdom of Thunder", recorded during rehearsals around the same time, shares the same line-up but with Lucious Randolph replacing Phil Cohran on trumpet, and Nate Pryor stepping out. "Distant Stars", recorded at the Wonder Inn, Chicago, around October 1960, shares the same line up as "Kingdom of Thunder", except for George Hudson on the trumpet instead of Cohran.

== See also ==
- Sun Ra discography
