= Monorails and Satellites =

Studio album by Sun Ra
- Released: Volume 1, 1968; Volume II, 1974
- Recorded: 1966, New York
- Genre: Jazz
- Labels: Saturn; Evidence
- Producer: Alton Abraham

Sun Ra chronology
| Strange Strings (1966) | Monorails and Satellites (1968) | Atlantis (1967) |

Professional ratings
Review scores
| Source | Rating |
|---|---|
| AllMusic | 3/5 stars |
| The Penguin Guide to Jazz Recordings | 3/4 stars |
| Rolling Stone | 4/5 stars |

Monorails and Satellites, Volumes I & II are two albums of solo piano compositions by the American Jazz musician Sun Ra. Both recorded in 1966, Volume 1 was released in 1968 under the title Monorails and Satellites and Volume II was released in 1974 under the title Monorails & Satellites, both on Sun Ra's own Saturn label. The first volume was reissued on compact disc by Evidence in 1992. Both volumes, along with nine previously unreleased tracks from the same sessions, were reissued in 2019 on the Cosmic Myth Records label as Monorails and Satellites: Works For Solo Piano Vols. 1, 2, 3. The album showcases Ra's skills as a pianist, which are often compared to Cecil Taylor's;

'Monorails and Satellites, a 1966 solo piano recording, showcases Ra's unique style, which bridges the bluesy architecture of Jelly Roll Morton with the angularity of Monk and Cecil Taylor's ascent beyond traditional structure.'

According to Ra's biographer, John Szwed, the title might refer to Stanley Kubrick's 2001, featuring a monolith that Ra remembered as a monorail, 'perhaps connecting it to his UFO experience'. Both albums shared the same sleeve of disembodied hands playing a keyboard that seems to be plugged directly into Saturn.

== Track listing ==
=== Volume 1, 12" Vinyl ===
All songs by Sun Ra except Easy Street;
Side A:

1. "Space Towers" - (3.37)
2. "Cogitation" - (6.36)
3. "Skylight" - (3.59)
4. "The Alter Destiny" - (3.08)

Side B:

1. "Easy Street" - (Jones) - (3.38)
2. "Blue Differentials" - (2.54)
3. "Monorails and Satellites" - (5.36)
4. "The Galaxy Sun" - (3.17)

=== Volume 2, 12" Vinyl ===
All songs by Sun Ra
Side A:

1. "Astro Vision" - (3.10)
2. "The Ninth Eye" - (9.00)
3. "Solar Boats" - (5.00)

Side B:

1. "Perspective Prisms of Is" - (6.20)
2. "Calundronius" - (8.00)

== Musician ==
- Sun Ra - piano, and electronics on Astro Vision

Recorded at the Sun Studios, New York (the commune where the Arkestra lived), 1966
