= When Angels Speak of Love =

Studio album by Sun Ra and his Myth Science Arkestra
- Released: 1966
- Recorded: 1963, New York
- Genre: Jazz
- Length: 45.50
- Label: Saturn; Evidence
- Producer: Alton Abraham

Sun Ra and his Myth Science Arkestra chronology
Cosmic Tones for Mental Therapy (1963)	When Angels Speak of Love (1966)	Other Planes of There (1964)

Professional ratings
Review scores
Source	Rating
Allmusic	3/5 stars
The Penguin Guide to Jazz Recordings	3.5/4 stars

When Angels Speak of Love is a music album by the American Jazz musician Sun Ra and his Myth Science Arkestra. Originally released in 1966 on Sun Ra's own Saturn label, the record would have only been available by mail order or sold at Arkestra concerts, and is one of the rarest of all Saturn releases. The record was reissued on compact disc by Evidence in 2000.

== Next stop Mars ==
'[When Angels Speak of Love] was considered a bizarre record when it was heard even three years later, made more bizarre by extreme echo, horns straining for the shrillest notes possible, rhythms layered, their polyrhythmic effect exaggerated by massive reverberation (which was abruptly turned off and on). Next Stop Mars is the centrepiece of the album, a very long work which opens with a space chant, followed by Allen and Gilmore taking chances on their horns beyond what almost any other musician would dare at that time. Sun Ra played behind them, again relentlessly spinning around a single tonal center with two-handed independence, then rumbling thunderously at the bottom of the keyboard against Boykins's bass, a clangor made heavier by electronic enhancement.' John F Szwed

== Track listing ==
=== 12" Vinyl ===
All songs by Sun Ra
Side A:

1. "Celestial Fantasy" - (5.55)
2. "The Idea of It All" - (7.32)
3. "Ecstasy of Being" - (9.53)

Side B:

1. "When Angels Speak of Love" - (4.34)
2. "Next Stop Mars" - (17.56)

== Musicians ==
- Sun Ra - Piano, Clavioline, Gong
- Walter Miller - Trumpet
- Marshall Allen - Oboe, Alto Saxophone, Percussion
- Danny Davis - Alto Sax
- John Gilmore - Tenor Sax, Percussion
- Pat Patrick - Baritone Saxophone, Percussion
- Robert Cummings - Bass Clarinet
- Ronnie Boykins - Bass
- Clifford Jarvis - Drums
- Tommy Hunter - Percussion, Reverb
- Ensemble vocals

Recorded at the Choreographer's Workshop, New York (the Arkestra's rehearsal space), in 1963.
