= Interstellar Low Ways =

Studio album by Sun Ra and his Myth Science Arkestra
- Released: 1966
- Recorded: March 6, 1959 – October 1960, Chicago
- Genre: Post-bop
- Length: 31:06
- Label: El Saturn
- Producer: Alton Abraham

Sun Ra and his Myth Science Arkestra chronology
Sound Sun Pleasure!! (1959)	Interstellar Low Ways (1966)	Fate in a Pleasant Mood (1960)

Professional ratings
Review scores
Source	Rating
AllMusic	4.5/5 stars

Interstellar Low Ways is an album recorded by the American jazz musician Sun Ra and his Myth Science Arkestra, mostly recorded in Chicago, 1960, and released in 1967 on his own El Saturn label. Originally titled Rocket Number Nine, the album had acquired its present name, and the red-on-white sleeve by Claude Dangerfield, by 1969. The album is known particularly for the two songs featuring chants, "Interplanetary Music" and "Rocket Number Nine Take Off for the Planet Venus". These would stay in the Arkestra's repertoire for many years.

Rocket Number Nine points toward the music that the Arkestra would be playing on the lower East Side of New York City. The tenor sax solo isn't the work of John Coltrane in 1962, but of John Gilmore in 1960. And not even Ornette Coleman's bassists were playing like Ronnie Boykins at this date.

— Robert Campbell

When reissued by Evidence, Interstellar Low Ways was included as the second half of a CD that also featured the whole of Sun Ra and his Solar Arkestra Visits Planet Earth (1966).

Lady Gaga references the titular line of "Rocket Number Nine Take Off for the Planet Venus" in her song "Venus".

== Marathon sessions at the RCA Studios ==
Most of the tracks were recorded at a marathon session tracking between 30 and 40 songs, either at RCA Studios or the Hall Recording Company (both in Chicago), around 17 June 1960. Other albums to include tracks from the session include Fate in a Pleasant Mood (1965), Angels and Demons at Play (1965), We Travel the Space Ways (1967) and Holiday for Soul Dance (1970).

A single, "Space Loneliness" b/w "State Street", was released shortly after the recording sessions. Whilst "State Street" was never released on an album by Ra, it was copyrighted as part of the "Space Loneliness" suite ("Space Loneliness: A Sound Concerto"), along with "Fate in a Pleasant Mood" and "Lights on a Satellite", on July 8, 1960. This single was followed up by another 7-inch from the session, "The Blue Set" b/w "Big City Blues", which wasn't included on any of the Saturn-released Chicago albums.

Trumpeter Phil Cohran later remembered the reaction "Space Loneliness" received when it was played on a local radio station:

When we played it on the radio in 1960 a woman called up the station. She said, "It sounds like something that crawled up from beneath the earth and died when it reached the sunlight."

The Arkestra in 1960; l-r, Marshall Allen, John Gilmore, Ronnie Boykins, Ricky Murray (crouching), Sun Ra, Walter Strickland and Billy Mitchell

=== The Wonder Inn, Chicago ===
In June 1960, their manager, Alton Abraham, secured the band a solid booking—their first since the Queen's Mansion gigs—playing first Wednesdays and then five nights a week at the Wonder Inn, at 75th and Cottage Grove in Chicago. Originally billed as "a special added attraction" for July 30, 1960 featuring Sun Ra and his "recording band", Abraham celebrated the engagements by acquiring for the band the entire wardrobe from a local opera company—heavily stocked with capes, puffed sleeves and doublets—that had been discarded after performing William Tell; from here on in, the whole band started to dress for 'Space'. The engagement, lasting until early 1961, "has justly become legendary".

We started [wearing space costumes] back in Chicago. In those days I tried to make the black people, the so-called negroes, conscious of the fact that they live in a changing world. And because I thought that they were left out of everything culturally, that nobody had thought about bringing them in contact with the culture, none of the black leaders did that.... that's why I thought I could make it clear to them that there are other things outside their closed environment. That's what I tried with those clothes. I designed some of them myself. I did it because just by seeing those clothes the people could get an idea of what I meant.

— Sun Ra

On other nights, the Arkestra would wear "purple blazers, white gloves, and beanies with propellers on top that lit up", and would set off robots with flashing lights and wind-up flying saucers into the audience.

== Track listing ==
All songs were written by Sun Ra.

Side one

1. "Onward" – 3.31
2. "Somewhere in Space" – 2.56
3. "Interplanetary Music" – 2.24
4. "Interstellar Low Ways" – 8.23

Side two

1. "Space Loneliness" – 4.30
2. "Space Aura" – 3.08
3. "Rocket Number Nine Take Off for the Planet Venus" – 6.14

== Personnel ==
On "Interstellar Low Ways", March 6, 1959:

- Sun Ra – gong
- Hobart Dotson – percussion
- Marshall Allen – flute
- James Spaulding – flute
- John Gilmore – tenor sax, percussion
- Pat Patrick – percussion
- Ronnie Boykins – bass
- William Cochran – drums

On "Space Loneliness", "Somewhere in Space", "Interplanetary Music" and "Rocket Number Nine", recorded at the RCA Studios, Chicago, around June 17, 1960:

- Sun Ra – piano
- Phil Cohran – cornet
- Nate Pryor – trombone
- Marshall Allen – alto sax, flute, bells
- John Gilmore – tenor sax, percussion
- Ronnie Boykins – bass, space gong
- Jon Hardy – drums, percussion, gong
- Ensemble – vocals

On "Onward" and "Space Aura", recorded during rehearsals, Chicago around October 1960:

- Sun Ra – piano
- George Hudson – trumpet
- Marshall Allen – alto sax, bells
- John Gilmore – tenor sax, percussion
- Ronnie Boykins – bass, percussion
- Jon Hardy – drums

== Bibliography ==
- Szwed, John F. (2000). Space Is the Place: The Life and Times of Sun Ra. Cambridge, Massachusetts: Da Capo Press. ISBN 978-0306808555.
