= Transparency (record label) =

- Founded: 1980
- Founder: Michael Sheppard
- Genre: Minimalism, classical, experimental
- Country of origin: United States
- Location: Los Angeles

Transparency is a North American music label mainly active in experimental, minimalist music, in classical and avant-garde music.

== History ==
Transparency is an independent North American record label founded by Michael Sheppard, promoter of experimental and avant-garde music, who died in Los Angeles on March 17, 2016 at the age of 59.

Among his artists are Sun Ra, Sun Ra Arkestra, Helios Creed & Chrome, Alessandra Celletti, Hans Joachim Roedelius, Lawrence Ball, Lane Steinberg, Rufus Harley.

Sheppard published with his label Transparency the first punk groups in Los Angeles including The Germs and 45 Grave and he brought Throbbing Gristle to Los Angeles in 1981.

== Transparency and Sun Ra ==
In September 2011 Transparency published Sun Ra-The Eternal Myth Revealed Vol. 1: 1914–1959, a box with 14 CDs containing 45 years of Sun Ra music. The realization of this document was launched by Michael D. Anderson, executive director of Sun Ra Music Archive in a press release in which Anderson himself said that "has produced this historically extensive work to bring to the attention of Sun Ra enthusiasts various facts and other music-related information they are not aware of ... The presentation includes interview footage with Sun Ra and Anderson narrating each section of the presentation for detailed accuracy."

== LP (album) ==
- Galactic Octopi - Helios Creed (2 LP)

== Compact disc ==
- Passion & Faith - Lane Steinberg
- Artificial Artist - Ace Farren Ford
- Bagpipes Of The World- Rufus Harley
- Folding Pineapple - Steve Thomsen
- Retrospective - Steve Thomsen
- Live At Club Lingerie - Sun Ra Arkestra
- Live At Myron's Ballroom - Sun Ra Arkestra
- The Creator Of The Universe - Sun Ra
- The Shadows Took Shape - Sun Ra
- The Eternal Myth Revealed Vol. 1 - Sun Ra
- Dance Of The Living Image - Sun Ra
- Intergalactic Research - Sun Ra*
- Live At The Horseshoe Tavern, Toronto 1978 - Sun Ra*
- The Complete Detroit Jazz Center Residency - Sun Ra And The Omniverse Jet Set Arkestra*
- The Universe Sent Me - Sun Ra*
- Helsinki 1971 - The Complete Concert And Interview - Sun Ra And His Intergalactic Solar Research Arkestra* –
- Newport Jazz Festival-The Electric Circus - Sun Ra*
- Live In Rome - Sun Ra
- Live In London - Sun Ra And The Intergalactic Research Arkestra
- Alessandra Celletti plays Baldassarre Galuppi - Alessandra Celletti
- Sustanza di Cose Sperata - Alessandra Celletti/Hans Joachim Roedelius -
- Crazy Girl Blue
- Above the sky

== DVD ==
- The Super-8 Years With Tuxedomoon - Tuxedomoon
- Solo Piano / Montreux And Lugano - Sun Ra / Sun Ra Arkestra*

== Books ==
- Paraphernalia (book and DVD) - Alessandra Celletti
- Painting with sound: Roedelius - Stephen Llife
