= When Sun Comes Out =

Studio album by Sun Ra and his Myth Science Arkestra
- Released: 1963
- Recorded: late 1962 or 1963, New York
- Genre: Jazz
- Length: 35:29 (LP); 49:51 (digital)
- Label: Saturn; Evidence
- Producer: Alton Abraham

Sun Ra and his Myth Science Arkestra chronology
Secrets of the Sun (1962)	When Sun Comes Out (1963)	Cosmic Tones for Mental Therapy (1963)

Professional ratings
Review scores
Source	Rating
Allmusic	3/5 stars
CD Allmusic	3.5/5 stars

When Sun Comes Out is the fifth studio album by the American Jazz musician Sun Ra and his Myth Science Arkestra. The album was originally released on Ra's own record label, Saturn, in 1963, and was the fifth album by the Arkestra to be put out, after Jazz by Sun Ra (1957), Super-Sonic Jazz (also 1957), Jazz in Silhouette (1959) and The Futuristic Sounds of Sun Ra (1961). The album was the first Saturn release to be taken from recordings made at the Choreographer's Workshop, New York. Other albums recorded there include Art Forms of Dimensions Tomorrow, Bad and Beautiful, Cosmic Tones for Mental Therapy and Other Planes of There.

'The New York period saw Ra focusing far more on percussion backdrops as opposed to horn arrangements (virtually everyone on the album gets a percussion credit), and everything from the percussion to the horn solos to Ra's piano playing took a more aggressive stance. John Gilmore's tenor solo on "Calling Planet Earth" throws the bop rule book out the window, and he is heard developing a more extended vocabulary of skronks and squeals. This track exemplifies the change in sound and focus from the Chicago days.... When Sun Comes Out is a first glimpse into an era that would culminate in some of the Arkestra's most renowned recordings.' Sean Westergaard

When reissued on Compact disc by Evidence in 1993, When Sun Comes Out was appended to the slightly earlier Fate In A Pleasant Mood.

== Track listing ==
=== 12" Vinyl ===
All songs by Sun Ra
Side A:

1. "Circe" – (2:34)
2. "The Nile" – (4:51)
3. "Brazilian Sun" – (3:50)
4. "We Travel the Spaceways" – (3:21)

Side B:

1. "Calling Planet Earth" – (5:30)
2. "Dancing Shadows" – (5:56)
3. "The Rainmaker" – (4:33)
4. "When Sun Comes Out" – (4:54)

=== Digital reissue (2014) ===
1. "Circe" [complete version] – (4:03)
2. "The Nile, Pt. 1" – (4:59)
3. "The Nile, Pt. 2" [previously unreleased] – (5:47)
4. "Brazilian Sun" – (3:56)
5. "We Travel the Spaceways" – (3:27)
6. "Calling Planet Earth" [stereo] – (5:36)
7. "Dancing Shadows" [stereo] – (6:02)
8. "The Rainmaker" [stereo] – (4:39)
9. "When Sun Comes Out" – (5:03)
10. "Dimensions in Time" (a.k.a. "Primitive)" [complete version] – (6:19)

Reissue notes:

- "Circe" is the complete version; the original El Saturn Records release omitted most of the introductory gong sequence.
- The previously unreleased part two of the percussive composition "The Nile".
- The LP's side two tracks (here 6 to 9) in stereo from the master tape. All known pressings of the LP were in mono.
- The complete "Dimensions in Time," previously released in an abridged version (and titled "Primitive") on Space Probe in 1974.

== Musicians ==
- Sun Ra - Piano, Electric Celeste, Percussion
- Walter Miller - Trumpet
- John Gilmore - Tenor Sax, Drums, Percussion, Percussion
- Teddy Nance - Trombone
- Bernard Pettaway - Trombone
- Marshall Allen - Flute, Alto Saxophone, Percussion
- Pat Patrick - Baritone Saxophone, Bongos, Drums on We Travel The Spaceways
- Danny Davis - Alto Sax
- Ronnie Boykins - Bass
- Clifford Jarvis - Drums
- Lex Humphries - Drums on Calling Planet Earth
- Tommy Hunter - Gong, Drums, Tape Effects
- Theda Barbara - Vocals
- Ensemble vocals

Recorded entirely at the Choreographer's Workshop, New York (the Arkestra's rehearsal space) in late 1962 or 1963.
