= The Nubians of Plutonia =

Nubians of Plutonia

Studio album by Sun Ra and his Myth Science Arkestra
- Released: c. 1966
- Recorded: c. 1958 – 1959, Chicago
- Genre: Avant garde jazz
- Length: 39:29
- Labels: Saturn; Impulse! Evidence
- Producer: Alton Abraham

Sun Ra and his Myth Science Arkestra chronology
Sun Ra and his Solar Arkestra Visits Planet Earth (1956-1958)	Nubians of Plutonia (1966)	Jazz in Silhouette (1959)

Reissue cover
- Impulse reissue, 1974

Professional ratings
Review scores
Source	Rating
AllMusic	4.5/5 stars
The Encyclopedia of Popular Music	4/5 stars

The Nubians of Plutonia is an album recorded by Sun Ra and his Myth Science Arkestra c.1958 – 1959 and released c.1966 on his own Saturn label. Originally released in a blank sleeve under the title The Lady with the Golden Stockings, the album had gained its current title, and sleeve by Richard Pedreguera, by 1969. In common with most releases by Sun Ra at the time, the record was printed in extremely limited numbers and primarily available at concerts and mail-order. The record was reissued by Impulse! in 1974, and on CD by Evidence in 1993, backed with the contemporaneous album Angels and Demons at Play.

"The Nubians of Plutonia ... evidence an Arkestra moving into ever looser, more abstract ground. The percussion becomes more varied and moves ever closer to the foreground. 'The Golden Lady' seduces with a swaying groove created by a combination of simple parts: hi-hat, cow bell, wood blocks, rolling floor toms and bass. Ra then sets up a dark melodic theme, and then the Arkestra proceeds to weave a series of jaunty, blues-tinged solos into the fabric of the groove. 'Nubia', 'Africa' and 'Aiethopia' continue this excursion into more mystical, rhythm-based territory. The Arkestra utilizes the same ominous, simmering percussion beds, now augmented by more exotic instruments like Pat Patrick's 'space lute', which gives a playfully sinister sound to 'Africa'.... This powerful, multi-faceted music is a great place to start if you are just beginning to travel with Sun Ra, or a great way to continue the journey." Mathew Wuethrich

== Track listing ==
=== 12" Vinyl ===
All songs were written by Sun Ra.
Side A:

1. "Plutonian Nights" - (4:22)
2. "The Lady with the Golden Stockings" (Later retitled "The Golden Lady" after the album's name was changed) - (7:41)
3. "Star Time" - (4:18)

Side B:

1. "Nubia" - (8:14)
2. "Africa" - (5:06)
3. "Watusa" - (2:36)
4. "Aethiopia" - (7:12)

== Musicians ==
- Sun Ra - Piano, Wurlitzer Electric Piano
- Lucious Randolph - Trumpet
- Nate Pryor - Trombone
- James Spaulding - Alto Saxophone, Percussion
- Marshall Allen - Alto Saxophone, Percussion
- John Gilmore - Tenor Saxophone, Percussion
- Pat Patrick - Baritone Saxophone, Percussion
- Charles Davis - Baritone Saxophone
- Ronnie Boykins - Bass
- Robert Barry - Drums, Percussion
- Jim Herndon - Percussion

On "Watusa", William Fielder replaced Lucious Randolph on Trumpet.

Recorded in rehearsal, Chicago, either 1958 or 1959. Lucious Randolph recalled recording "Aiethopia" in a club with bad acoustics; "the mike was on the other end."

== See also ==
- Sun Ra Discography
