= Alton Abraham =

African-American entrepreneur (1927–1999)

- Born: 5 May 1927 – 6 June 1999

Alton Abraham (5 May 1927 – 6 June 1999) was an African American social entrepreneur who acted as business manager for jazz musician Sun Ra.

== Early life ==
Abraham was born in Chicago and served in the U.S Military in Okinawa from 1945 to 1947. When he returned to Chicago, he studied at the DuSable High School (1947–1950) and Wilson Junior College, gaining qualifications as a Radiographer at Provident Hospital from 1952. In 1951, he sang in Edward Virgil Abner's vocal ensemble, the Knights of Music.

== Association with Sun Ra ==
In late 1951, Abraham met Sun Ra and the two men soon discovered a shared interest in ancient history, mysticism, numerology, the occult and science. Together with Sun Ra and his brother Artis A. Abraham Father of Anita A. Abraham, current President of Ihnfinity Inc., he co-founded El Saturn Records. During his tenure as Sun Ra's business manager, he amassed a large collection of objects, artifacts, documents, and materials associated with the musician, which are preserved as the Alton Abraham Collection of Sun Ra at the Regenstein Library at the University of Chicago.
