= Cosmic Tones for Mental Therapy =

Studio album by Sun Ra and his Myth Science Arkestra
- Released: 1967
- Recorded: 1963, New York
- Genre: Jazz
- Length: 31.53
- Label: Saturn; Evidence
- Producer: Alton Abraham

Sun Ra and his Myth Science Arkestra chronology
| When Sun Comes Out | Cosmic Tones for Mental Therapy (1967) | When Angels Speak of Love (1963) |

Professional ratings
Review scores
| Source | Rating |
|---|---|
| AllMusic | 3/5 stars |
| The Encyclopedia of Popular Music | 3/5 stars |

Cosmic Tones for Mental Therapy is an album by the American Jazz musician Sun Ra and his Myth Science Arkestra recorded in 1963, but not released until 1967 on Sun Ra's own Saturn label. The record was reissued on compact disc by Evidence in 2000.

Originally released in a sleeve with a Sun Ra doodle, the better known cover, designed by Richard Pedreguera, was in place by 1969. Pedreguera also designed the sleeve for The Nubians of Plutonia at around the same time.

== Reception and legacy ==
The album has been discussed within the context of anticipating psychedelia or pointing towards the funk of George Clinton;

'Clinton's astral ritual seems as inspired by the Nation of Islam as it is by Sun Ra, and when asked about the Ra in 1979, Clinton said, "This boy was definitely out to lunch - the same place I eat at."

When reissued on CD, Art Forms of Dimensions Tomorrow was added to the disc.

== Track listing ==
=== 12" Vinyl ===
All songs by Sun Ra
Side A:

1. "And Otherness" – (5.10)
2. "Thither and Yon" – (4.01)
3. "Adventure-Equation" - (8.26)

Side B:

1. "Moon Dance" – (6.34)
2. "Voice of Space" – (7.42)

== Musicians ==
- Sun Ra – Hammond B-3 Organ, Clavioline, Percussion
- Marshall Allen – Oboe, Percussion
- Danny Davis – Alto Sax, Flute
- John Gilmore – Bass Clarinet, Percussion
- possibly Bernard Pettaway – Bass Trombone
- Pat Patrick – Baritone Saxophone
- Robert Cummings – Bass Clarinet
- Ronnie Boykins – Bass
- Clifford Jarvis – Drums
- James Jacson – Percussion
- Tommy Hunter – Percussion, Reverb
- Ensemble vocals

First two tracks recorded at the Choreographer's Workshop, New York (the Arkestra's rehearsal space), in 1963. Adventure-Equation, Moon Dance and Voice of Space were recorded at the Tip Top club, Brooklyn, in the same year, at 10 in the morning whilst Tommy Hunter was playing nights there with Sarah McLawler's trio, since the club provided access to a Hammond B-3 organ gratis. Hunter remembers some neighbourhood kids running in during the recording and shouting, "These guys don't know how to play!".
