= Afro-Arts Theater =

Theater in Chicago, Illinois, U.S.

- Interactive map of Afro-Arts Theater
- Address: 3900 S. Drexel; Chicago, Illinois; United States
- Coordinates: 41°48′08″N 87°36′14″W

Construction
- Opened: 1967

The Afro-Arts Theater was a regional theater on Chicago's South Side established in 1967 by Kelan Philip Cohran. The theater was also a meeting place for black power activists and considered central to the growth of African American consciousness in Chicago. On December 28, 1969, Gwendolyn Brooks received at the theater what she considered "the most stirring and significant tribute of her life."
