= Salah Ragab =

- Born: 1935; Cairo, Egypt
- Died: July 2008 (aged 72–73) Egypt
- Genres: Jazz
- Occupation: Musician
- Instrument: Drums
- Years active: 1960s–1980s

Salah Ragab (Arabic: صلاح رجب) was an Egyptian drummer, born in the city of Cairo in 1935.

== Career ==
While serving as a major in the Egyptian army, Ragab tried to form a jazz band with American saxophonist Mac X. Spears in the early 1960s, but Spears left the country soon after its inception. At a concert by Randy Sexton, Ragab befriended Hartmut Geerken and Eduard Vizvari, and they started the Cairo Jazz Band. In his work for the military's department of music Ragab selected musicians to join the big band and taught them jazz. The Cairo Jazz Band performed for the first time at American University in 1969, performing original works in addition to music by Count Basie and Dizzy Gillespie, then in Alexandria and Cairo. The band recorded in the early 1970s. Geerken invited Sun Ra, who made a few visits to Egypt. Ragab performed with Ra in 1971 and 1983. Ra recorded two of Ragab's songs: "Dawn" and "Egypt Strut". Ragab also briefly with the German band Embryo.

== Discography ==
=== As leader ===
- Egypt Strut (Arab Republic Of Egypt - Ministry Of Culture, 1974)
- Soirée De Musique Populaire Arabe (Sono Cairo, 1975)
- Egyptian Jazz (Art Yard, 2006)

=== As sideman ===
- Embryo, La Blama Sparozzi (Schneeball, 1982)
- The Sun Ra Arkestra Meets Salah Ragab Plus The Cairo Jazz Band, In Egypt (Praxis, 1983)
