= Michael Publig =

Austrian composer

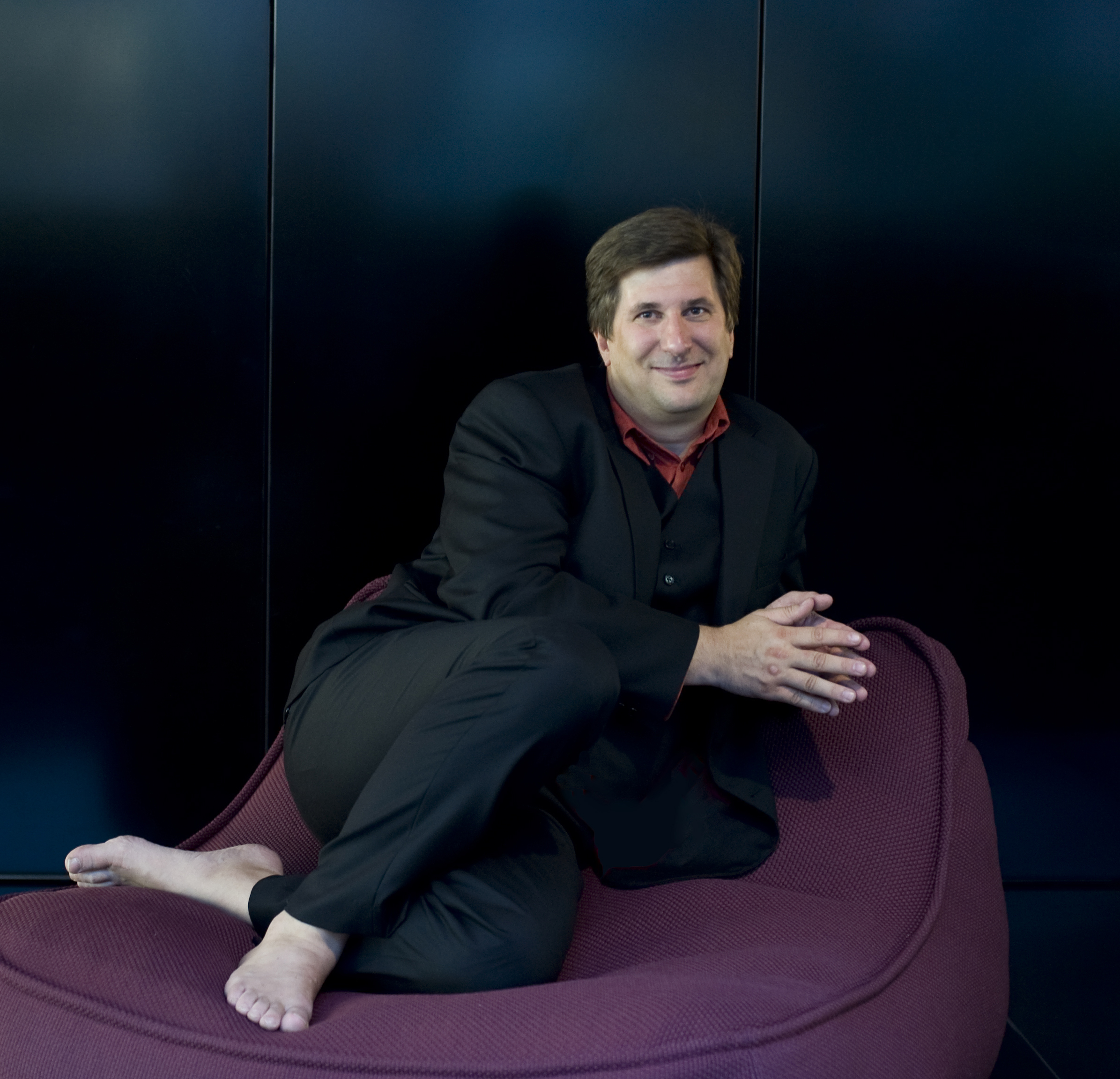
- Born: 29 July 1961 (age 64)

Michael Publig (born 29 July 1961 in Vienna) is an Austrian composer, pianist, instructor, and music manager. He studied piano with Roland Batik at the City of Vienna Conservatory and Social and Economic Sciences at the Vienna University of Economics.

== Activities ==
International projects in the chamber music, jazz, Brazilian music, tango nuevo, and flamenco.

Award winner of several composition competitions (Gustav Mahler Competition 2006, E- and U-Kompositionspreis des ÖKB 2001 and 2002). Performances of his works in Europe, Asia, Australia and the US; radio broadcasts. Arranger, editor, author: Publications in all musical fields with several international publishing houses (Austria, Germany, US, China). Additionally, e.g., unpublished edition of the almost entire complete works of Chick Corea (until 1996) Publication of the Chick Corea Omnibook at Hal Leonard (300 pages of transcriptions). His interest in film music and his experience as a publisher led him into the position of being the head of music preparation of Hollywood in Vienna as of 2017.

He teaches arranging at the Vienna music university (at the Anton Bruckner institute) and piano, improvisation, composition and music theory at Amadeus International School Vienna (until 2020), since then piano and music education at the de la Salle 21. He also taught Jazz Chamber Music at the University for Music and Performing Arts in Vienna; Numerous workshops and master classes for piano (jazz, pop, classical), improvisation and jazz harmony (at home and abroad, e.g. at the Konservatorium Wien University, Central Conservatory Beijing, Shanghai Conservatory, China), music computer programs. Head of Music Preparation for Hollywood in Vienna. Publishing manager of many years at Doblinger; panel member in many institutions (e.g. Österreichisches Staatsstipendium for composition); organizer of several concerts with the emphasis on jazz chamber music; producer of numerous CDs.

=== Selected works ===
==== Jazz chamber music ====
- Coreasts for Chamber Band (for flute, vibes, piano and string quartet)
- Hang Loose (for violin and piano) or quartet
- No Major Chords Please (Trio for flute (or) violin, bassoon (or cello) and piano)
- Rhapsody on a Blue Cello (for cello and piano)
- Rhapsody on a Blue Flute (for flute and piano)
- Rhapsody on a Blue Violin (for violin and piano)
- Scenes on an Imaginary Movie (for flute, bassoon (cello) and harp (or piano)
- Time In-Time Out (for piano trio)
- To Brothers (for guitar and piano)
- Suite Cubana (Septet for flute, piano, bass and string quartet)
- Various music for two pianos

==== Concerts ====
- Brazilian Choro Concerto (for flute, piano, guitar and string orchestra)
- Concerto for piano with big band
- A Seeker in his Travels (for accordion and big band)
- El Viento Andaluz (Concierto Clásico del Flamenco Jazz, for vibes (or guitar or piano 2), piano and string quartet)
- Fantasia Suite-Ibero Americano (for guitar, mallets and piano)
- Stories from Ternitz (for big band)
- Suite Cubana (for jazz quartet and string orchestra)

==== Flamenco (chamber music) ====
- Alegrías de Concierto (for oboe and piano)
- Andalusia (for Oboe (or flute, cello, violin or guitar) and piano)
- Flamenco-Rhapsody (for piano, clapping, stomping (1 player)
- The Mistery of Ronda (for flute, cello, bass, piano, percussion)
- Misa Flamenca (for choir, guitar, percussion, organ ad lib.)
- Suite Andaluza (mixed ensemble)

==== Brazilian (chamber-) music ====
- Amadeus no Brasil (Chorando a Sonata para 2 pianos por Mozart, for guitar (or flute) and piano)
- Choro de Concerto (for 2 pianos)
- Chorinho pra Dudu (for vibes, bass and piano)
- Dança Sertao (for flute, guitar, piano and string quartet)
- Egberto Gismonti (Flute, piano, also with cello)
- O Rio (Suite do Araguaia, for flute and piano)

==== Tango Nuevo ====
- 3 Tangos Nuevos (Astorizado, Buscando, Tangasíon (for vibes, bass and piano or piano solo)
- Tangasíon (for orchestra, orchestrated by Pablo Boggiano)
- Ultimo Tango (for violin (or cello) and piano oder piano and string quartet)

==== Various instrumentations ====
- Baker's House (for flute, vibes, bass, guitar, piano and percussion)
- Chameleon Suite (for flute, 2 trumpets, bass, piano, keyboards, drums)
- Clare Fischer (for piano)
- Ligetations-Day 1 & 2 (for piano)
- Magic Ray (for chamber ensemble)
- Meer der Träume (for mezzo-soprano and piano)
- Nite Song (for keyboards, piano, bass, percussion and drums)
- On the Irish Side of Life (for harp, piano (flute and cello ad lib.)
- Rhapsody in Pink (Bohemian Variations on a Well-Known Theme by Freddie Mercury for 2 pianos)
- Vamonos! (for flute and organ)

== Pedagogical works, sheet music editions (selection) ==
- Applaus, Applaus! Show time for my first piano concerto! (incl. CD, Doblinger)
- Chillin' with Jazzy Feel Good Songs from the piano series On the Lighter Side (Doblinger)
- Christmas. Das Weihnachtsalbum. Die schönsten Weihnachtslieder in gut singbaren Tonarten, easy set for Piano (Keyboards) (Doblinger)
- Jazz On! Classics. Eight Classics for Piano (from Mozart to Debussy) and Ten Jazz Piano Interpretations (incl. CD) (People's Music Publishing, Beijing; Doblinger)
- Jazz PianoSuite. 15 Jazz Variations in the Style of the Masters for classical pianists (Doblinger)
- Jazz Up! Paganini – A Crazy Concert Piece for Classical Pianists. Virtuoso Jazz Piano Suite based on the Capriccio No. 24 by Paganini (Doblinger)
- [Spooky – Of Witches and Ghosts. Scary Pieces for Piano/Keyboards (incl. CD, Doblinger)
- Dave Weckl & Jay Oliver – In Session with the Dave Weckl Band, Players Circle (Presser)

== Discography (selection) ==
- Caliente (Galileo, 2021)
- Brasiliade (Gramola, 2011)
- Jazz Piano Suite (2010)
- Jazz on! Classics (3 editions, People's Music Publishing, Beijing; Doblinger, 2005)
- Motions & Emotions. New Latin Music (1999)
- Joy to the World! (Doblinger, 1995)
- 3 Zimmer. Küche. Tod. (Soundtrack, 2006)
- Neue Kammermusik aus Niederösterreich. (Works for Violoncello and Piano, Ursula Erhart-Schwertmann, Violoncello, Edda Andrea Graf, Piano, RICH ART Records, 2012)
- Fidelio-Wettbewerb 2013 (Desislava Tinkova Dobreva-Flöte, Lilyana Milenova Kehayova-Violoncello, Bernhard Voss, Piano, ORF-CD 3176, 2013)

== Current projects ==
- Brasiliade (Brazilian chamber music with Stefan Oser, guitar and Edison Tadeu, Percussion)
- Caliente (Cuban, Flamenco, Chamber Jazz with Antonis Vounelakos, guitar, Rafael Jenner, Drums & Gerhard Graml, Bass)
- Jazz Chamber Music (with Tomasz Skweres, Cello)
- Lighter Side Trio („Celtic-Latin-Chamber-Jazz“ with Monika Stadler, concert harp and Tomasz Skweres, Cello)
- El Viento Andaluz (Flamenco-Jazz-chamber music with Antonis Vounelakos, guitar, Sabina La Canelita, dance, voice and string quartet)
