= Phil Cohran =

American musician (1927–2017)

- Born: Philip Thomas Cohran Jr. May 8, 1927; Oxford, Mississippi, US
- Died: June 28, 2017 (aged 90) Chicago, Illinois, US
- Genre: Jazz
- Instruments: Trumpet, harp, cornet, french horn, baritone saxophone, space harp

Kelan Phil Cohran (May 8, 1927 – June 28, 2017) was an American jazz musician. He was best known for playing trumpet in the Sun Ra Arkestra in Chicago from 1959 to 1961, and for his involvement in the foundation of the Association for the Advancement of Creative Musicians (AACM).

== Biography ==
Cohran was born in Oxford, Mississippi, on May 8, 1927. When he was about nine, he moved with his family to Missouri. There, his father became a cook in a restaurant in Troy, while the rest of the family stayed in St. Louis. Cohran played trumpet in bands led by Jay McShann in the early 1950s, and then in a U.S. Navy band.

He was introduced to the Sun Ra Arkestra by John Gilmore in 1959. He appeared on the albums Fate In A Pleasant Mood and Angels and Demons at Play among others. He played mostly trumpet and sometimes stringed instruments such as the zither.

When the Arkestra moved from Chicago in 1961, Cohran declined to accompany them. In 1965 he took part in the founding of the Association for the Advancement of Creative Musicians. He formed the Artistic Heritage Ensemble with Pete Cosey, future members of Earth, Wind and Fire's horn section and Motown percussionist "Master" Henry Gibson, among others. By this time, he was playing the harp, cornet, French horn, baritone saxophone and percussion. The group recorded the album On the Beach around 1967.

In 1967, Cohran founded the Afro-Arts Theater, a center for African American musicians, in Chicago's South Side.

Early in his career, he invented an instrument he called the Frankiphone or the Space Harp, which is actually an electrified mbira or kalimba; he played it on some of Sun Ra's early albums. This instrument inspired Maurice White to use an electrified Kalimba in performance with Earth, Wind and Fire. Cohran said that he taught White and his brothers music in their youth, much as The Wailers were tutored by Joe Higgs. On the Beach features the Frankiphone on the title track, as well as a piece called "New Frankiphone Blues".

Several of Cohran's sons make up eight of the nine members of the Hypnotic Brass Ensemble, which consists of four trumpets, two trombones, one euphonium, a sousaphone and drums. With Hypnotic Brass Ensemble he recorded an album which had a simple idea: "my music and their band". Cohran taught voice and music to inner city youth and adults at Northeastern Illinois University's Center for Inner City Studies. He died in Chicago, on June 28, 2017, at the age of 90.

== Discography ==
=== As leader ===
- On the Beach (1968)
- Spanish Suite (1968) Katalyst / Tizona
- Armageddon (Conceived in 1958 and written down in 1963 performed in 1968) Katalyst / Tizona
- The Malcolm X Memorial (1968)
- African Skies (1993, Captcha Records) as 'Kelan Phil Cohran And Legacy'
- Kelan Philip Cohran And The Hypnotic Brass Ensemble (2012, Honest Jon's Records)
- Single (2007)
- White Nile (1993)

=== As sideman ===
With Sun Ra

- Interstellar Low Ways (1959)
- Holiday for Soul Dance (1960)
- Fate in a Pleasant Mood (1960)
- Angels and Demons at Play (1965)

== Filmography ==
- Skywatchers of Africa (2002), music composition
