= Angels and Demons at Play =

Studio album by Sun Ra and his Myth Science Arkestra
- Released: 1967
- Recorded: 1956–1960
- Genre: Jazz
- Length: 24:04
- Label: Saturn; Impulse! Evidence
- Producer: Alton Abraham

Sun Ra and his Myth Science Arkestra chronology
Fate In A Pleasant Mood (1965)	Angels and Demons at Play (1967)	We Travel the Space Ways (1967)

Professional ratings
Review scores
Source	Rating
Allmusic (LP)	3/5 stars
Allmusic (CD)	4.5/5 stars

Angels and Demons at Play is a jazz album by Sun Ra and his Myth Science Arkestra.

Side one was recorded in 1960, including two tracks taken from the mammoth session either at Hall Recording Company or at the RCA Studios (both in Chicago), around 17 June 1960, whilst the tracks on side two were recorded at the RCA studios, Chicago, around February 1956. Saturn Records had issued at least three of the songs ("Medicine for a Nightmare" b/w "Urnack", and "A Call For All Demons", the B-side of an early version of the song "Saturn") as 7-inch singles.

According to the musicologist Robert L. Campbell, the latter single was probably the first Saturn release. It was a relatively common theme of Saturn releases to feature different sessions, from different eras with different personnel, on different sides of a record. Other examples include The Invisible Shield (1962/1970) and Deep Purple (1948-57/1973).

The distinctive sleeve was designed by Sun Ra, and uses the same design on both sides, leaving no room for sleeve notes.

== Track listing ==
=== 12" Vinyl ===
All titles were written by Sun Ra, except where noted.
Side A:

1. "Tiny Pyramids" (Ronnie Boykins) – 3:38
2. "Between Two Worlds" – 1:56
3. "Music from the World Tomorrow" – 2:20
4. "Angels and Demons at Play" (Marshall Allen, Ronnie Boykins) – 2:51

Side B:

1. "Urnack" (Julian Priester) – 3:46
2. "Medicine for a Nightmare" – 2:16
3. "A Call for All Demons" – 4:12
4. "Demon's Lullaby" – 2:35

The 1993 compact disc release appends the album The Nubians of Plutonia in its entirety.

== Musicians ==
On "Urnack", "Medicine for a Nightmare", "A Call For Demons", and "Demon's Lullaby", recorded RCA Studios, Chicago, around February 1956;

- Sun Ra - Piano, Electric Piano
- Art Hoyle - Trumpet,
- Julian Priester - Trombone
- John Gilmore - Tenor Sax
- Pat Patrick - Baritone Sax
- Wilburn Green - Electric Bass
- Robert Barry - Drums
- Jim Herndon - Tympani

On "Tiny Pyramids" and "Angels And Demons At Play", RCA Studios Chicago, around June 17, 1960;

- Sun Ra - Percussion, Bells, Gong and Piano
- Phil Cohran - Cornet
- Nate Pryor - Trombone and Bells
- John Gilmore - Tenor Sax and Clarinet, percussion
- Marshall Allen - Flute
- Ronnie Boykins - Bass
- Jon Hardy - Drums, Percussion

On "Between Two Worlds" recorded during rehearsals at the same time;

- Sun Ra - Piano
- possibly Bo Bailey - Trombone
- John Gilmore - Tenor Sax
- Marshall Allen - Alto Sax
- Ronnie Boykins - Bass
- possibly Robert Barry - Drums

On "Music From The World Tomorrow", also recorded during rehearsals in Chicago, 1960;

- Sun Ra - 'Cosmic tone organ
- Ronnie Boykins - Bass
- Phil Cohran - Violin-uke
- Jon Hardy - Drums

== Release history ==
Date	Label	Format	Catalog	Notes
1965	Saturn Records	LP	9956-2-0/P	
1967	Saturn Records	LP	LP 407	
1974	Impulse! Records	LP	AS 9245	
1993	Evidence Music	CD	ECD 22066-2	
2004	Saturn Research	LP	SR-9956-2-O	
2016	DOL	LP	DOL914H	
