= Sun Ra =

American jazz composer and bandleader (1914–1993)

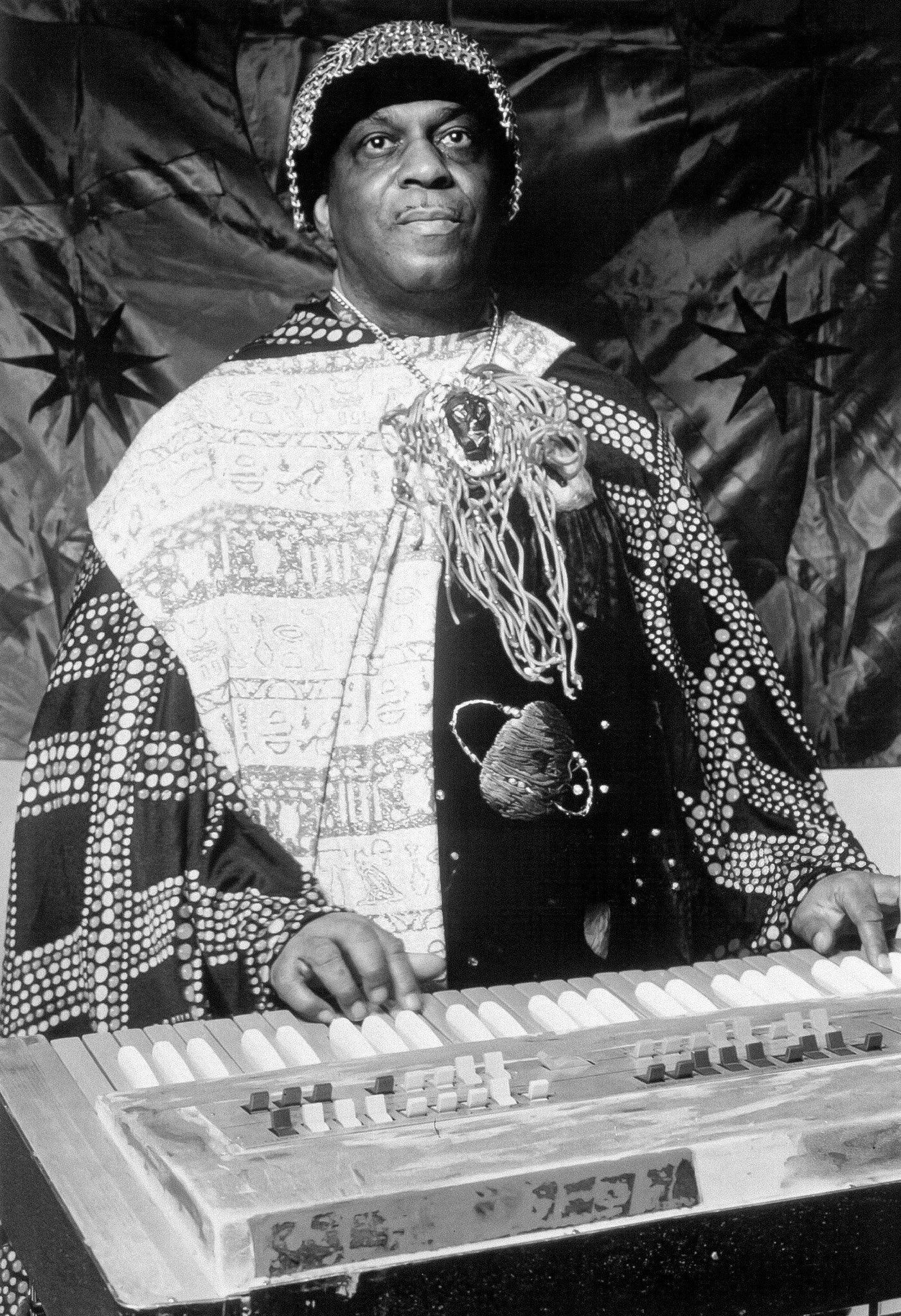
- Sun Ra, c. 1973

Background information
- Also known as: Le Sony'r Ra (legal name)
- Born: Herman Poole Blount; May 22, 1914; Birmingham, Alabama, U.S.
- Died: May 30, 1993 (aged 79) Birmingham, Alabama, U.S.
- Genres: Jazz; experimental; space; avant-garde
- Occupations: Bandleader; composer; arranger; artist; poet
- Instruments: Keyboards; vocals
- Years active: 1934–1993
- Labels: El Saturn; Thoth Intergalactic; Impulse!; MPS; ESP-Disk; Black Saint; A&M; Leo; Rounder

Le Sony'r Ra (born Herman Poole Blount, May 22, 1914 – May 30, 1993), better known as Sun Ra, was an American jazz composer, bandleader, piano and synthesizer player, and poet known for his experimental music, "cosmic" philosophy, prolific output, and theatrical performances. For much of his career, Ra led The Arkestra, an ensemble with an ever-changing name and flexible line-up.

Born and raised in Alabama, Ra became involved in the Chicago jazz scene during the late 1940s. He soon abandoned his birth name, taking the name Le Sony'r Ra, shortened to Sun Ra (after Ra, the Egyptian god of the Sun). Claiming to be an alien from Saturn on a mission to preach peace, he developed a mythical persona and an idiosyncratic credo that made him a pioneer of Afrofuturism. Throughout his life he denied ties to his prior identity saying, "Any name that I use other than Ra is a pseudonym." His widely eclectic and avant-garde music echoed the entire history of jazz, from ragtime and early New Orleans hot jazz, to swing music, bebop, free jazz and fusion. His compositions ranged from keyboard solos to works for big bands of over 30 musicians, along with electronic excursions, songs, chants, percussion pieces, and anthems.

From the mid-1950s until his death, Ra led the musical collective The Arkestra, which featured artists such as Marshall Allen, John Gilmore and June Tyson throughout its various iterations. Its performances often included dancers and musicians dressed in elaborate, futuristic costumes inspired by ancient Egyptian attire and the Space Age. Following Ra's retirement in 1992 due to illness, the band remained active as The Sun Ra Arkestra, and, as of 2026, continues performing under the leadership of veteran Ra sideman Marshall Allen.

Though his mainstream success was limited, Ra was a prolific recording artist and frequent live performer, and remained influential throughout his life for his music and persona. He is now widely considered an innovator; among his distinctions are his pioneering work in free improvisation and modal jazz and his early use of electronic keyboards and synthesizers. Over his career, he recorded dozens of singles and over 100 full-length albums, comprising well over 1,000 songs, making him one of the most prolific recording artists of the 20th century.

== Early life ==
Herman Poole Blount was born Herman Blount on May 22, 1914, in Birmingham, Alabama, as discovered by his biographer, John F. Szwed, and published in his 1997 book, Space Is the Place: The Lives and Times of Sun Ra. He was named after the popular vaudeville stage magician Black Herman, who had deeply impressed his mother. He was nicknamed "Sonny" from his childhood, had an older sister and half-brother, and was doted upon by his mother and grandmother.

For decades, very little was known about Sun Ra's early life, and he contributed to its mystique. As a self-invented person, he routinely gave evasive, contradictory or seemingly nonsensical answers to personal questions, and denied his birth name. He speculated, only half in jest, that he was distantly related to Elijah Poole, later known as Elijah Muhammad, leader of the Nation of Islam. His birthday for years remained unknown, as his claims ranged from 1910 to 1918. Only a few years before his death, the date of Sun Ra's birth was still a mystery. Jim Macnie's notes for Blue Delight (1989) said that Sun Ra was believed to be about 75 years old. This turned out to be correct; Szwed was able to uncover a wealth of information about his early life, and confirmed a birth date of May 22, 1914.

As a child, Blount was a skilled pianist. By the age of 11 or 12, he was composing and sight reading music. Birmingham was an important stop for touring musicians and he saw prominent musicians such as Fletcher Henderson, Duke Ellington, and Fats Waller, and other less well known performers. Sun Ra once said, "The world let down a lot of good musicians".

In his teenage years, Blount demonstrated prodigious musical talent: many times, according to acquaintances, he went to big band performances and then produced full transcriptions of the bands' songs from memory. By his mid-teens, Blount was performing semi-professionally as a solo pianist, or as a member of various ad hoc jazz and R&B groups. He attended Birmingham's segregated Industrial High School (now known as Parker High School), where he studied under music teacher John T. "Fess" Whatley, a demanding disciplinarian who was widely respected and whose classes produced many professional musicians.

Though deeply religious, his family was not formally associated with any Christian church or sect. Blount had few or no close friends in high school but was remembered as kind-natured and quiet, an honor roll student, and a voracious reader. He took advantage of the Black Masonic Lodge as one of the few places in Birmingham where African Americans had unlimited access to books. Its collection on Freemasonry and other esoteric concepts made a strong impression on him.

By his teens, Blount suffered from cryptorchidism. It left him with a nearly constant discomfort that sometimes flared into severe pain. Szwed suggests that Blount felt shame about it and the condition contributed to his isolation.

== Career ==
=== Early professional career and college ===
In 1934, Blount was offered his first full-time musical job by Ethel Harper, his biology teacher from the high school, who had organized a band to pursue a career as a singer. Blount joined a musicians' trade union and toured with Harper's group through the US Southeast and Midwest. When Harper left the group mid-tour to move to New York (she later was a member of the modestly successful singing group the Ginger Snaps), Blount took over leadership of the group, renaming it the Sonny Blount Orchestra. They continued touring for several months before dissolving as unprofitable. Though the first edition of the Sonny Blount Orchestra was not financially successful, they earned positive notice from fans and other musicians. Blount afterward found steady employment as a musician in Birmingham.

Birmingham clubs often featured exotic trappings, such as vivid lighting and murals with tropical or oasis scenes. Some believe these influenced the elements Sun Ra incorporated in his later stage shows. Playing for the big bands gave black musicians a sense of pride and togetherness, and they were highly regarded in the black community. They were expected to be disciplined and presentable, and in the segregated South, black musicians had wide acceptance in white society. They often played for elite white society audiences (though they were typically forbidden from associating with the audience).

In 1936, Whatley's intercession led to Blount's being awarded a scholarship at Alabama Agricultural and Mechanical University. He was a music education major, studying composition, orchestration, and music theory. He dropped out after a year.

=== Trip to Saturn ===
Blount left college because, he claimed, he had a visionary experience as a college student that had a major, long-term influence on him. In 1936 or 1937, in the midst of deep religious concentration, Sun Ra claimed that a bright light appeared around him, and, as he later said:

My whole body changed into something else. I could see through myself. And I went up... I wasn't in human form... I landed on a planet that I identified as Saturn... they teleported me and I was down on [a] stage with them. They wanted to talk with me. They had one little antenna on each ear. A little antenna over each eye. They talked to me. They told me to stop [attending college] because there was going to be great trouble in schools... the world was going into complete chaos... I would speak [through music], and the world would listen. That's what they told me.

Blount claimed that this experience occurred in 1936 or 1937. According to Szwed, the musician's closest associates cannot date the story any earlier than 1952. (Blount also said that the incident happened when he was living in Chicago, where he did not settle until the late 1940s). Sun Ra discussed the vision, with no substantive variation, to the end of his life. His trip to Saturn allegedly occurred a full decade before flying saucers entered public consciousness with the 1947 encounter of Kenneth Arnold. It was earlier than other public accounts: about 15 years before George Adamski wrote about contact with benevolent beings; and almost 20 years before the 1961 case of Barney and Betty Hill, who recounted sinister UFO abductions. Szwed says that, "even if this story is revisionist autobiography... Sonny was pulling together several strains of his life. He was both prophesizing his future and explaining his past with a single act of personal mythology." Steingo emphasizes understanding Sun Ra's statements about his life in relation to his music. Steingo writes: "Rather than think of [Sun Ra's] music as a performance and then consider only the content of his spoken words, we might instead understand everything he did as part of the same project to listen otherwise."

=== New devotion to music (late 1930s) ===
After leaving college, Blount became known as the most singularly devoted musician in Birmingham. He rarely slept, citing Thomas Edison, Leonardo da Vinci, and Napoleon as fellow highly productive cat-nappers. He transformed the first floor of his family's home into a conservatory-workshop, where he wrote songs, transcribed recordings, rehearsed with the many musicians who drifted in and out, and discussed Biblical and esoteric concepts with whoever was interested.

Blount became a regular at Birmingham's Forbes Piano Company, a white-owned company. Blount visited the Forbes building almost daily to play music, swap ideas with staff and customers, or copy sheet music into his notebooks. He formed a new band, and like his old teacher Whatley, insisted on rigorous daily rehearsals. The new Sonny Blount Orchestra earned a reputation as an impressive, disciplined band that could play in a wide variety of styles with equal skill.

=== Draft and wartime experiences ===
In October 1942, Blount received a selective service notification that he had been drafted into the Military of the United States. He quickly declared himself a conscientious objector, citing religious objections to war and killing, his financial support of his great-aunt Ida, and his chronic hernia. The local draft board rejected his claim. In an appeal to the national draft board, Blount wrote that the lack of black men on the draft appeal board "smacks of Hitlerism." Sonny's refusal to join the military deeply embarrassed his family, and many relatives ostracized him. He was eventually approved for alternate service at Civilian Public Service camp in Pennsylvania, but he did not appear at the camp as required on December 8, 1942. Shortly after, he was arrested in Alabama.

In court, Blount said that alternate service was unacceptable; he debated the judge on points of law and Biblical interpretation. The judge ruled that Blount was violating the law and was at risk for being drafted into the U.S. military. Blount responded that if inducted, he would use military weapons and training to kill the first high-ranking military officer possible. The judge sentenced Blount to jail (pending draft board and CPS rulings), and then said, "I've never seen a nigger like you before." Blount replied, "No, and you never will again."

In January 1943, Blount wrote to the United States Marshals Service from the Walker County, Alabama jail in Jasper. He said he was facing a nervous breakdown from the stress of imprisonment, that he was suicidal, and that he was in constant fear of sexual assault. When his conscientious objector status was reaffirmed in February 1943, he was escorted to Pennsylvania. He did forestry work as assigned during the day and was allowed to play piano at night. Psychiatrists there described him as "a psychopathic personality [and] sexually perverted," but also as "a well-educated colored intellectual."

In March 1943, the draft board reclassified Blount as 4-F because of his hernia, and he returned to Birmingham, embittered and angered. He formed a new band and soon was playing professionally. After his beloved great-aunt Ida died in 1945, Blount felt no reason to stay in Birmingham. He dissolved the band, and moved to Chicago—part of the Second Great Migration, southern African Americans who moved north during and after World War II.

=== Chicago years (1945–1961) ===
In Chicago, Blount quickly found work, notably with blues singer Wynonie Harris, with whom he made his recording debut on two 1946 singles, Dig This Boogie/Lightning Struck the Poorhouse, and My Baby's Barrelhouse/Drinking By Myself. Dig This Boogie was also Blount's first recorded piano solo. He performed with the locally successful Lil Green band and played bump-and-grind music for months in Calumet City strip clubs.

In August 1946, Blount earned a lengthy engagement at the Club DeLisa under bandleader and composer Fletcher Henderson. Blount had long admired Henderson, but Henderson's fortunes had declined (his band was now made of up middling musicians rather than the stars of earlier years) in large part because of his instability, due to Henderson's long-term injuries from a car accident. Henderson hired Blount as pianist and arranger, replacing Marl Young. Blount's arrangements initially showed a degree of bebop influence, but the band members resisted the new music, despite Henderson's encouragement.

In 1948, Blount performed briefly in a trio with saxophonist Coleman Hawkins and violinist Stuff Smith, both preeminent musicians. There are no known recordings of this trio, but home recordings of two different Blount-Smith duets from 1953 appear on Sound Sun Pleasure!! and Deep Purple, and one of Sun Ra's final recordings in 1992 was a rare sideman appearance on violinist Billy Bang's Tribute to Stuff Smith.

In addition to enabling professional advancement, what he encountered in Chicago changed Blount's personal outlook. The city was a center of African-American political activism and fringe movements, with Black Muslims, Black Hebrews, and others proselytizing, debating, and printing leaflets or books. Blount absorbed it all and was fascinated with the city's many ancient Egyptian-styled buildings and monuments. He read books such as George G.M. James's Stolen Legacy (which argued that classical Greek philosophy had its roots in ancient Egypt). Blount concluded that the accomplishments and history of Africans had been systematically suppressed and denied by European cultures.

By 1952, Blount was leading the Space Trio with drummer Tommy "Bugs" Hunter and saxophonist Pat Patrick, two of the most accomplished musicians he had known. They performed regularly, and Sun Ra began writing more advanced songs.

On October 20, 1952, Blount legally changed his name to Le Sony'r Ra. Sun Ra claimed to have always been uncomfortable with his birth name of Blount. He considered it a slave name, from a family that was not his. David Martinelli suggested that his change was similar to "Malcolm X and Muhammad Ali... [dropping] their slave names in the process of attaining a new self-awareness and self-esteem".

Patrick left the group to move to Florida with his new wife. His friend John Gilmore (tenor sax) joined the group, and Marshall Allen (alto sax) soon followed. Patrick was in and out of the group until the end of his life, but Allen and Gilmore were the two most devoted members of the Arkestra. Saxophonist James Spaulding and trombonist Julian Priester also recorded with Sun Ra in Chicago, and both went on to careers of their own. The Chicago tenor Von Freeman also did a short stint with the band of the early 1950s.

In Chicago, Sun Ra met Alton Abraham, a precociously intelligent teenager and something of a kindred spirit. He became the Arkestra's biggest booster and one of Sun Ra's closest friends. Both men felt like outsiders and shared an interest in esoterica. Abraham's strengths balanced Ra's shortcomings: though he was a disciplined bandleader, Sun Ra was somewhat introverted and lacked business sense (a trait that haunted his entire career). Abraham was outgoing, well-connected, and practical. Though still a teenager, Abraham eventually became Sun Ra's de facto business manager: he booked performances, suggested musicians for the Arkestra, and introduced several popular songs into the group's repertoire. Ra, Abraham and others formed a sort of book club to trade ideas and discuss the offbeat topics that so intrigued them. This group printed a number of pamphlets and broadsides explaining their conclusions and ideas. Some of these were collected by critic John Corbett and Anthony Elms as The Wisdom of Sun Ra: Sun Ra's Polemical Broadsheets and Streetcorner Leaflets (2006).

In the mid-1950s, Sun Ra and Abraham formed an independent record label that was generally known as El Saturn Records. (It had several name variations.) Initially focused on 45 rpm singles by Sun Ra and artists related to him, Saturn Records issued two full-length albums during the 1950s: Super-Sonic Jazz (1957) and Jazz in Silhouette (1959). Producer Tom Wilson was the first to release a Sun Ra album, through his independent label Transition Records in 1957, entitled Jazz by Sun Ra. During this era, Sun Ra recorded the first of dozens of singles as a band-for-hire backing a range of doo wop and R&B singers; several dozen of these were reissued in a two-CD set, The Singles, by Evidence Records.

In the late 1950s, Sun Ra and his band began to wear outlandish, Egyptian-styled or science fiction-themed costumes and headdresses. These costumes had multiple purposes: they expressed Sun Ra's fascination with ancient Egypt and the space age, they provided a recognizable uniform for the Arkestra, they provided a new identity for the band onstage, and comic relief. (Sun Ra thought avant garde musicians typically took themselves far too seriously.)

=== New York years (1961–1968) ===
Sun Ra and the Arkestra moved to New York City in the fall of 1961. To save money, Sun Ra and his band members lived communally. This enabled Sun Ra to request rehearsals spontaneously and at any time, which was his established habit. It was during this time in New York that Sun Ra recorded the album The Futuristic Sound of Sun Ra.

In March 1966, the Arkestra secured a regular Monday night gig at Slug's Saloon. This was a breakthrough to new audiences and recognition. Sun Ra's popularity reached an early peak during this period, as the beat generation and early followers of psychedelia embraced him. Regularly for the next year and a half (and intermittently for another half-decade afterwards), Sun Ra and company performed at Slug's for audiences that eventually came to include music critics and leading jazz musicians. Opinions of Sun Ra's music were divided (and hecklers were not uncommon).

High praise, however, came from two of the architects of bebop. Trumpeter Dizzy Gillespie offered encouragement, once stating, "Keep it up, Sonny, they tried to do the same shit to me," and pianist Thelonious Monk chided someone who said Sun Ra was "too far out" by responding: "Yeah, but it swings."

Also in 1966, Sun Ra, with members of the Arkestra and Al Kooper's Blues Project, recorded the album Batman and Robin under the pseudonym, The Sensational Guitars of Dan and Dale. The album consisted primarily of instrumental variations on the Batman Theme and public domain classical music, with an uncredited female vocalist singing the "Robin Theme."

=== Philadelphia years (1968) ===
In 1968, when the New York building they were renting was put up for sale, Sun Ra and the Arkestra relocated to the Germantown section of Philadelphia. Sun Ra moved into a house on Morton Street that became the Arkestra's base of operations until his death. It eventually became known as the Arkestral Institute of Sun Ra. Apart from occasional complaints about the noise of rehearsals, they were soon regarded as good neighbors because of their friendliness, drug-free living, and rapport with youngsters. The saxophonist Danny Ray Thompson owned and operated the Pharaoh's Den, a convenience store in the neighborhood. When lightning struck a tree on their street, Sun Ra took it as a good omen. James Jacson fashioned the Cosmic Infinity Drum from the scorched tree trunk. They commuted via railroad to New York for the Monday night gig at Slug's and for other engagements.

Sun Ra became a fixture in Philadelphia, appearing semi-regularly on WXPN radio, giving lectures to community groups, or visiting the city's libraries. In the mid-1970s, the Arkestra sometimes played free Saturday afternoon concerts in a Germantown park near their home. At their mid-1970s shows in Philadelphia nightclubs, someone stood at the back of the room, selling stacks of unmarked LPs in plain white sleeves, pressed from recordings of the band's live performances.

=== California and world tours (1968–1993) ===
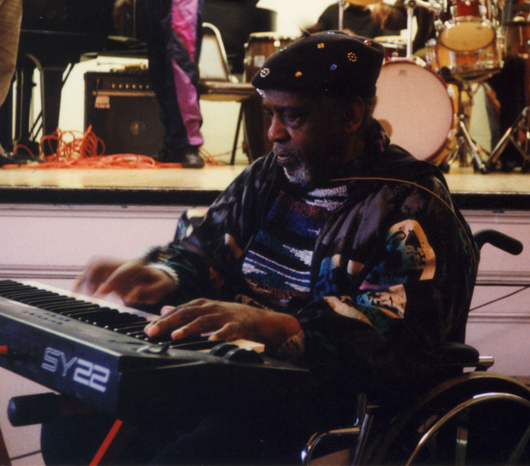
Sun Ra at the New England Conservatory of Music, February 27, 1992

In late 1968, Sun Ra and the Arkestra made their first tour of the US West Coast. Reactions were mixed. Some hippies accustomed to long-form psychedelia like the Grateful Dead were entranced and enthralled by the Arkestra, others merely bewildered. San Francisco was friendly to avant garde jazz from the early 50s and quickly welcomed Sun Ra's music. By this time, the performance included 20–30 musicians, dancers, singers, fire-eaters, and elaborate lighting. John Burks of Rolling Stone wrote a positive review of a San Jose State College concert. Sun Ra was featured on the April 19, 1969, cover of Rolling Stone magazine, which introduced his inscrutable gaze to millions. During this tour, Damon Choice, then an art student at San Jose, joined the Arkestra and became its vibraphonist.

Starting with concerts in France, Germany, and the United Kingdom in 1970, the Arkestra began to tour internationally. They played to audiences who had known his music only through records. Sun Ra continued playing in Europe almost to the end of his life. The saxophonist Danny Ray Thompson became a de facto tour and business manager during this era, specializing in what he called "no bullshit C.O.D.," preferring to take cash before performing or delivering records.

In early 1971, Sun Ra was appointed as artist-in-residence at University of California, Berkeley, teaching a course called The Black Man in the Cosmos. Few students enrolled, but his classes were often full of curious people from the surrounding community. One half-hour of each class was devoted to a lecture (complete with handouts and homework assignments), the other half-hour to an Arkestra performance or Sun Ra keyboard solo. Reading lists included the works of Madame Blavatsky and Henry Dumas, the Tibetan Book of the Dead, Alexander Hislop's The Two Babylons, The Book of Oahspe, and assorted volumes concerning Egyptian hieroglyphs, African American folklore, and other topics.

In 1971, Sun Ra traveled throughout Egypt with the Arkestra at the invitation of the drummer Salah Ragab. He returned to Egypt in 1983 and 1984, when he recorded with Ragab. Recordings made in Egypt were released as Live in Egypt, Nidhamu, Sun Ra Meets Salah Ragab, Egypt Strut and Horizon.

In 1972, San Francisco public TV station KQED producer John Coney, producer Jim Newman, and screenwriter Joshua Smith worked with Sun Ra to produce an 85-minute feature film, entitled Space Is the Place, with Sun Ra's Arkestra and an ensemble of actors assembled by the production team. It was filmed in Oakland and San Francisco. A 1975 show concert by the Arkestra in Cleveland featured an early lineup of Devo as the opening act. On May 20, 1978, Sun Ra and the Arkestra appeared on the TV show Saturday Night Live (S3 E20).

In New York City in the fall of 1979, Sun Ra and the Arkestra played as the "house band" at the Squat Theatre on 23rd Street, which was the performance venue of the avant-garde Hungarian theater troupe. Janos, their manager, transformed the theater into a nightclub while most of the troupe was away that season performing in Europe. Debbie Harry, The Velvet Underground's John Cale and Nico (from Andy Warhol's Factory days), John Lurie and The Lounge Lizards, and other pop and avant-garde musicians were regulars. Sun Ra was disciplined and drank only club soda at the gigs, but did not impose his strict code on his musicians. They respected his discipline and authority. Soft-spoken and charismatic, Sun Ra turned Squat Theater into a universe of big band "space" jazz backed by a floor show of sexy Jupiterettes. He directed while playing three synthesizers at the same time. In those days, "Space Is The Place" was the space at Squat.

The Arkestra continued their touring and recording through the 1980s and into the 1990s.

== Death ==
Sun Ra had a stroke in 1990, but kept composing, performing, and leading the Arkestra. Late in his career, he opened a few concerts for the New York–based rock group Sonic Youth. When too ill to perform and tour, Sun Ra appointed Gilmore to lead the Arkestra. Gilmore was frail from emphysema; after his death in 1995, Allen took over leadership of the Arkestra.

In late 1992, Sun Ra returned to his birth city of Birmingham to live with his older sister, Mary Jenkins, who (along with various Blount cousins) became his caretaker. In January, he was admitted to Princeton Baptist Medical Center, suffering from congestive heart failure, respiratory failure, strokes, circulatory problems, and other serious maladies. He died in the hospital on May 30, 1993, and was buried at the Elmwood Cemetery. The footstone reads "Herman Sonny Blount aka Le Sony'r Ra".

== The Arkestra ==
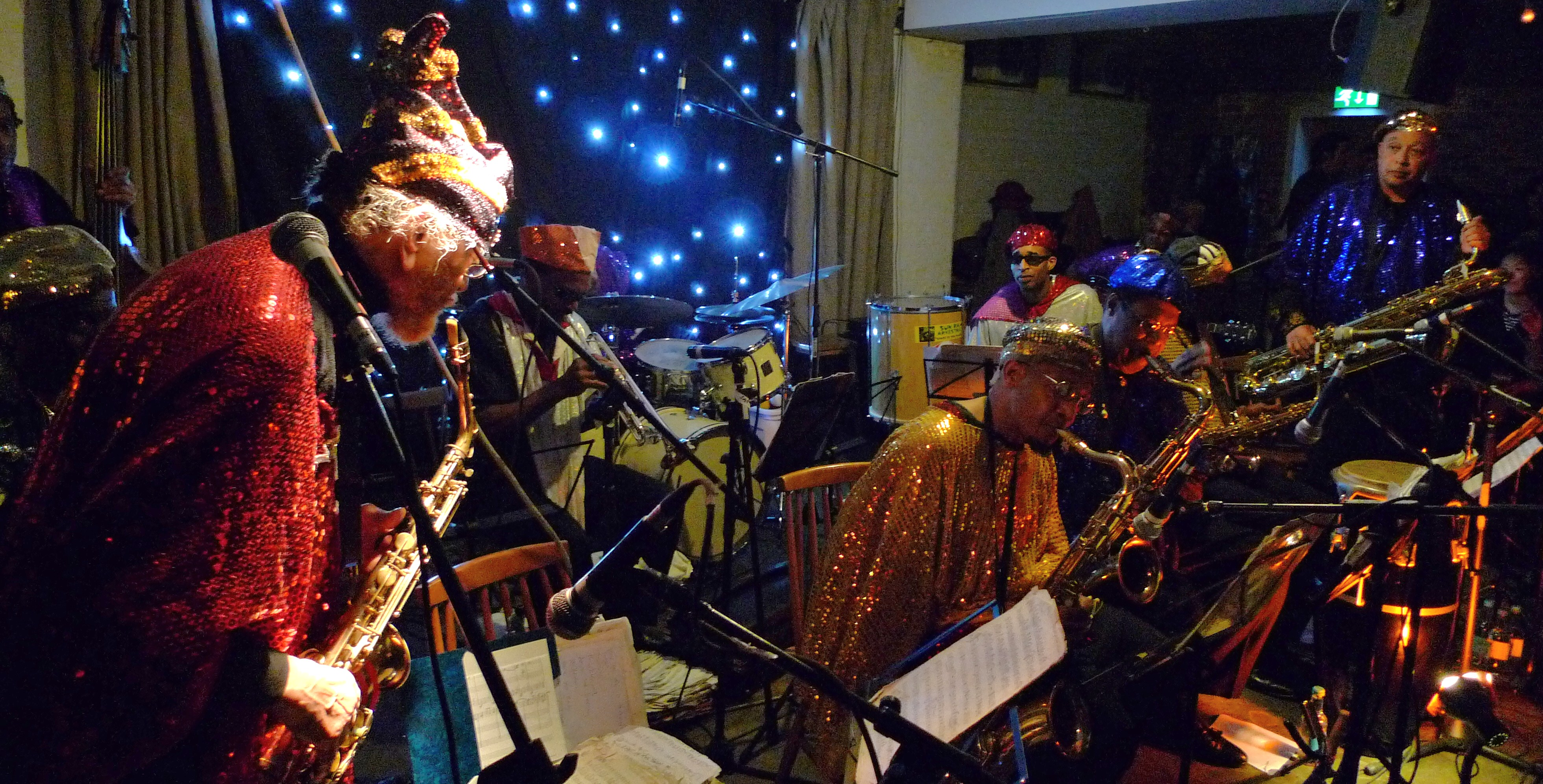
The Sun Ra Arkestra performing in London in 2010.

Following Sun Ra's death, the Arkestra was led by tenor saxophonist John Gilmore and later performed under the direction of alto saxophonist Marshall Allen. A 1999 album led by Allen, Song for the Sun, featured Jimmy Hopps and Dick Griffin. In the summer of 2004 the Arkestra became the first American jazz band to perform in Tuva, Siberia, where they played five sets at the Ustuu-Huree Festival.

In September 2008 they played for 7 days in a row at the ZXZW festival, each day emphasizing different aspects of the musical legacy of Sun Ra. In 2009, they performed at Philadelphia's Institute of Contemporary Art in conjunction with an exhibition that explored the intersection of the Arkestra's performing legacy and the practice of contemporary art. In 2011, they ventured to Australia for the first time, for the 2011 Melbourne International Jazz Festival and MONA (Museum of Old and New Art) in Tasmania. In 2017, the Arkestra performed at the 31st Lowell Folk Festival in Lowell Massachusetts. In 2019, it was announced that the Arkestra would perform at Portland, Oregon's Hollywood Theater for three nights on July 14, 15 and 16. On October 22, 2021, they performed at the BRIC JazzFest in Downtown Brooklyn.

== Music ==
Sun Ra's piano technique touched on many styles: his youthful fascination with boogie woogie, stride piano and blues, a sometimes refined touch reminiscent of Count Basie or Ahmad Jamal, and angular phrases in the style of Thelonious Monk or brutal, percussive attacks like Cecil Taylor. Often overlooked is the range of influences from classical music – Sun Ra cited Chopin, Rachmaninoff, Schoenberg and Shostakovich as his favorite composers for the piano.

Sun Ra's music can be roughly divided into three phases, but his records and performances were full of surprises and the following categories should be regarded only as approximations.

=== Chicago phase ===
The first period occurred in the 1950s when Sun Ra's music evolved from big band swing into the outer-space-themed "cosmic jazz" for which he was best known. Music critics and jazz historians say some of his best work was recorded during this period and it is also some of his most accessible music. Sun Ra's music in this era was often tightly arranged and sometimes reminiscent of Duke Ellington's, Count Basie's, or other important swing music ensembles. However, there was a strong influence from post-swing styles like bebop, hard bop, and modal jazz, and touches of the exotic and hints of the experimentalism that dominated his later music. Notable Sun Ra albums from the 1950s include Sun Ra Visits Planet Earth, Interstellar Low Ways, Super-Sonic Jazz, We Travel the Space Ways, The Nubians of Plutonia and Jazz in Silhouette.

Ronnie Boykins, Sun Ra's bassist, has been described as "the pivot around which much of Sun Ra's music revolved for eight years." This is especially pronounced on the key recordings from 1965 (The Magic City, The Heliocentric Worlds of Sun Ra, Volume One, and The Heliocentric Worlds of Sun Ra, Volume Two) where the intertwining lines of Boykins' bass and Ra's electronic keyboards provide cohesion.

=== New York phase ===
After the move to New York, Sun Ra and company plunged headlong into the experimentalism that they had only hinted at in Chicago. The music was often extremely loud and the Arkestra grew to include multiple drummers and percussionists. In recordings of this era, Ra began to use new technologies—such as extensive use of tape delay—to assemble spatial sound pieces, such as "Saturn", which were far removed from earlier compositions. Recordings and live performances often featured passages for unusual instrumental combinations, and passages of collective playing that incorporated free improvisation. It is often difficult to tell where compositions end and improvisations begin.

In this era, Sun Ra began conducting using hand and body gestures. This system inspired cornetist Butch Morris, who later developed his own more highly refined way to conduct improvisers.

Though often associated with avant-garde jazz, Sun Ra did not believe his work could be classified as "free music": "I have to make sure that every note, every nuance, is correct... If you want to call it that, spell it p-h-r-e, because ph is a definite article and re is the name of the sun. So I play phre music – music of the sun."

Seeking to broaden his compositional possibilities, Sun Ra insisted all band members double on various percussion instruments – predating world music by drawing on various ethnic musical forms – and most saxophonists became multireedists, adding instruments such as flutes, oboes, or clarinets to their arsenals. In this era, Sun Ra was among the first of any musicians to make extensive and pioneering use of synthesizers and other various electronic keyboards; he was given a prototype Minimoog by its inventor, Robert Moog. According to the Bob Moog Foundation: "Sun Ra first met Robert Moog after Downbeat journalist and Sun Ra acquaintance Tam Fiofori arranged for a visit to Moog's factory in Trumansburg in the Fall of 1969....it was during this visit that Moog loaned Sun Ra a prototype Minimoog (Model B), several months before the commercial instrument (Model D) was introduced in March 1970. Ra immediately added the instrument to his repertoire of keyboards, later acquired a second, and featured the Minimoog prominently on many of his recordings of the early 1970s."

Notable titles from this period include The Magic City, Cosmic Tones for Mental Therapy, When Sun Comes Out, The Heliocentric Worlds of Sun Ra, Volume One, Atlantis, Secrets of the Sun and Other Planes of There.

=== Philadelphia phase ===
During their third period, beginning around 1976, Sun Ra and the Arkestra settled down into a relatively conventional sound, often incorporating swing standards, although their records and concerts were still highly eclectic and energetic, and typically included at least one lengthy, semi-improvised percussion jam. Sun Ra was explicitly asserting a continuity with the ignored jazz tradition: "They tried to fool you, now I got to school you, about jazz, about jazz" he chanted in concerts, framing the inclusion of pieces by Fletcher Henderson and Jelly Roll Morton.

In the 1970s Sun Ra took a liking to the films of Walt Disney. He incorporated smatterings of Disney musical numbers into many of his performances from then on. In the late 1980s the Arkestra performed a concert at Walt Disney World. The Arkestra's version of "Pink Elephants on Parade" is available on Stay Awake, a tribute album of Disney tunes played by various artists and produced by Hal Willner. A number of Sun Ra's 1970s concerts are available on CD, but none have received a wide release in comparison to his earlier music. In 1978–1980 performances, Sun Ra added a large electronic creation, the Outerspace Visual Communicator, which produced images rather than sounds; this was performed at a keyboard by its inventor, Bill Sebastian. During concerts, the OVC usually was positioned at center stage behind the Arkestra while Sebastian sat on stage with the musicians.

=== Musicians ===
Dozens of musicians—perhaps hundreds—passed through Sun Ra's bands over the years. Some stayed with him for decades, whilst others played on only a few recordings or performances.

Sun Ra was personally responsible for the vast majority of the constant changes in the Arkestra's lineup. According to contrabassist Jiunie Booth, a member of the Arkestra, Sun Ra did not confront any musician whose performance he was unsatisfied with. Instead, he would simply gather the entire Arkestra minus the offending musician, and skip town—leaving the fired musician stranded. The following is a partial list of musical collaborators, and the eras when they played with Sun Ra or the Arkestra:

- Ahmed Abdullah, trumpet, (1976–1993)
- Yahya Abdul-Majid, tenor saxophone (1980–2020)
- Fred Adams, trumpet (1981–?)
- Luqman Ali (Edward Skinner), drums (1960, 1977–?)
- Marshall Allen, alto saxophone, flute, oboe (1957–present)
- Atakatune (Stanley Morgan), percussion (1972–1992)
- Ayé Aton (Robert Underwood), drums and percussion (1972–1976)
- Robert Barry, drums (1955–1968, 1979)
- Ronnie Boykins, double bass (1957–1974)
- Arthur "Jiunie" Booth, double bass
- Darryl Brown, drums (1970–1972)
- Owen "Fiidla" Brown, violin, dance, vocals (1987–1990s and later appearances)
- Tony Bunn, electric bass (1976)
- Francisco Mora Catlett, drums (1973–1980)
- Samarai Celestial (Eric Walker), drums (1979–1997)
- Don Cherry, pocket trumpet (1983–1990)
- Vincent Chancey, French horn (1976–1995)
- Damon Choice, vibraphone (1974–?)
- Phil Cohran, trumpet (1959–1961)
- India Cooke, violin (1990–1995)
- Danny Davis, alto saxophone, flute (1962–1977, 1985)
- Dave Davis, trombone (1997–present)
- Joey DeStefano, alto saxophone (1968–1969)
- Arthur Doyle, saxophone (1968, 1989)
- Akh Tal Ebah, trumpet
- Bruce Edwards. guitar (1983–1993)
- Richard Evans, bass (1950s)
- Eddie Gale, trumpet (1960s)
- John Gilmore, tenor saxophone, bass clarinet (1954–1964, 1965–1995)
- Dick Griffin, trombone
- Kwame Hadi (Lamont McClamb), trumpet, conga, vibraphone (1969–1996)
- Billy Higgins, drums, (1989)
- Tyrone Hill, trombone (1979–present)
- Tommy "Bugs" Hunter, drums, sound engineer (1951–1990)
- James Jacson, bassoon, oboe, flute, Ancient Egyptian infinity drum (1963–1997)
- Clifford Jarvis, drums, (1961–1976, 1983)
- Art Jenkins, vocals (1960–1971, 1988–2012)
- Donald Jones, drums (1973–1974)
- Wayne Kramer, guitar (2006)
- Elson Nascimento, percussion, vocals (1987–present)
- Bob Northern, french horn
- Eloe Omoe, bass clarinet, oboe
- John Ore, double bass
- Taylor Richardson, guitar (1979–1983)
- Pat Patrick, baritone saxophone, alto saxophone, clarinet, flute (1950–1959, 1961–1977, 1985–1988)
- Julian Priester, trombone (1955–1956, 1980s–1990s)
- Rollo Radford, bass
- Knoel Scott, alto saxophone, tenor saxophone, baritone saxophone, singer and dancer (1979–present)
- Buster Smith, drums
- Marvin "Bugalu" Smith, drums
- James Spaulding, alto sax, flute (1959)
- Michael Ray, trumpet (1978–present)
- Pharoah Sanders, saxophone (1964–1965)
- Bill Sebastian, outerspace visual communicator (1978–1980)
- Talvin Singh, tablas
- Alan Silva, double bass, cello, violin (early 1970s)
- Tani Tabbal, drums
- Danny Ray Thompson, baritone saxophone (1967–1995, 2002–2020)
- Clifford Thornton, trombone
- June Tyson, singer, violin

=== Outer Space Visual Communicator ===
The Outer Space Visual Communicator was a giant machine that was played with hands and feet to create light designs, similar to how musicians create and sound with their instruments. The name of the instrument arose from Bill Sebastian's collaboration with Sun Ra, who incorporated the OVC into the Arkestra from 1978 to 1980 and experimented on video applications from 1981 to 1987.

== Philosophy ==
Sun Ra's world view was often described as a philosophy, but he rejected this term, describing his own manner as an "equation" and saying that while philosophy is based on theories and abstract reasoning, his method was based on logic and pragmatism. Many of the Arkestra cite Sun Ra's teachings as pivotal in inspiring their long-term devotion to music. His equation was rarely (if ever) explained as a whole; instead, it was related in bits and pieces over many years, leading some to doubt that he had a coherent message. However, Martinelli argues that, when considered as a whole, one can discern a unified world view that draws upon many sources, but is also unique to Sun Ra, writing:

Sun Ra presents a unified conception, incorporating music, myth, and performance into his multi-leveled equations. Every aspect of the Sun Ra experience, from business practices like Saturn Records to published collections of poetry to his 35-year career in music, is a manifestation of his equations. Sun Ra seeks to elevate humanity beyond their current earthbound state, tied to outmoded conceptions of life and death when the potential future of immortality awaits them. As Hall has put it, "In this era of 'practical' things men ridicule even the existence of God. They scoff at goodness while they ponder with befuddled minds the phantasmagoria of materiality. They have forgotten the path which leads beyond the stars."

He drew on sources as diverse as the Kabbalah, Rosicrucianism, channeling, numerology, Freemasonry, Ancient Egyptian Mysticism, and Black nationalism. Sun Ra's system had distinct Gnostic leanings, arguing that the god of most monotheistic religions was not the creator god, not the ultimate god, but a lesser, evil being. Sun Ra was wary of the Bible, knowing that it had been used to justify slavery. He often rearranged and reworded Biblical passages (and reworked many other words, names, or phrases) in an attempt to uncover "hidden" meanings. The most obvious evidence of this system was Ra's practice of renaming many of the musicians who played with him.

Bassoonist/multireedist James Jacson had studied Zen Buddhism before joining Sun Ra and identified strong similarities between Zen teachings and practices (particularly Zen koans) and Ra's use of non-sequiturs and seemingly absurd replies to questions. Drummer Art Jenkins admitted that Sun Ra's "nonsense" sometimes troubled his thoughts for days until inspiring a sort of paradigm shift, or profound change in outlook. Drummer Andrew Cyrille said Sun Ra's comments were "very interesting stuff... whether you believed it or not. And a lot of times it was humorous, and a lot of times it was ridiculous, and a lot of times it was right on the money."

Sun Ra's philosophy can be further understood in viewing his film Space is the Place. The film opens with Sun Ra on a distant planet, where the music and vibrations are much different from Earth where the air is filled with the sounds of "guns, anger and frustration." A colony is erected on this planet specifically for black people because only on a distant planet will the black race be free to return to their natural vibrations and live in harmony. This will give rise to an "altered destiny." The film also discloses Sun Ra's ideas on how to get his people to another planet. This can be accomplished through, "isotopic teleportation, trans-molecularization, or better still – teleport the whole planet here through music."

=== Sun Ra and black culture ===
According to Szwed, Sun Ra's view of his relationship to black people and black cultures "changed drastically" over time. Initially, Sun Ra identified closely with broader struggles for black power, black political influence, and black identity, and saw his own music as a key element in educating and liberating blacks. But by the heyday of Black Power radicalism in the 1960s, Sun Ra was expressing disillusionment with these aims. He denied feeling closely connected to any race. In 1970 he said:

I couldn't approach black people with the truth because they like lies. They live lies... At one time I felt that white people were to blame for everything, but then I found out that they were just puppets and pawns of some greater force, which has been using them... Some force is having a good time [manipulating black and white people] and looking, enjoying itself up in a reserved seat, wondering, "I wonder when they're going to wake up."

==== Afrofuturism ====
Sun Ra is considered to be an early pioneer of the Afrofuturism movement due to his music, writings and other works.

The influence of Sun Ra can be seen throughout many aspects of black music. He grounded his practice of Afrofuturism in a musical tradition that has been described as "performing blackness". Sun Ra lived out his beliefs of Afrofuturism in his daily life by embodying the movement not only in his music, but also in his clothes and actions. This embodiment of the narrative allowed him to demonstrate black nationalism as a counternarrative to the contemporary culture.

It was in Chicago, as well, in the mid-fifties, that Ra began experimenting with extraterrestriality in his stage show, sometimes playing regular cocktail lounges dressed in space suits and ancient Egyptian regalia. By placing his band and performances in space and extraterrestrial environments Sun Ra built a world that was his own view of how the African diaspora connected.

== Influence and legacy ==
Many of Sun Ra's innovations remain important and groundbreaking. Ra was one of the first jazz leaders to use two double basses, to employ the electric bass, to play electronic keyboards, to use extensive percussion and polyrhythms, to explore modal music and to pioneer solo and group freeform improvisations. In addition, he made his mark in the wider cultural context: he proclaimed the African origins of jazz, reaffirmed pride in black history and reasserted the spiritual and mystical dimensions of music, all important factors in the black cultural/political renaissance of the 1960s.

NRBQ recorded "Rocket #9" in 1968 for their debut album on Columbia. Sun Ra had given NRBQ's Terry Adams a copy of the song on 45 and told him, "This is especially for you," which Adams reported inspired him to reform the band after a period of inactivity. The band still includes Sun Ra's compositions in their performances, and besides "Rocket #9" have released recordings of "We Travel the Spaceways" and "Love in Outer Space." Several members of the Arkestra have toured with NRBQ over the years, including Pat Patrick, Marshall Allen, Knoel Scott, Tyrone Hill and Danny Thompson. Adams has joined the Arkestra as their pianist on several tours, most recently during a February 2016 tour of cities in the US southeast.

Detroit's MC5 played a handful of shows with Sun Ra and were influenced by his works immensely. One of their songs from their premiere album Kick Out the Jams (1969) featured a track called "Starship", which was based on a poem by Ra.

Sun Ra was inducted into the Alabama Jazz Hall of Fame in 1979.

The Sun Ra Repatriation Project was started in 2008 with the aim of using interplanetary communication with a view to facilitating Sun Ra's return to planet Earth.

Filmmaker and visual artist Cauleen Smith has heavily researched the life and legacy of Sun Ra. Her 2013 exhibition "17" "arises out of [her] research into the legacy of Sun Ra, who was himself a student of numerology and achieved a kind of cultural immortality the number 17 might be said to refer to". Her project "The Solar Flare Arkestral Marching Band" includes several components related to Sun Ra. "One component (2010) of the project is the production of five flash mob street performances involving a marching band inspired by Sun Ra's Arkestra. The second component of the project ... is a full-length video that chronicles the urban legends of Sun Ra's time in Chicago as well as the contemporary artists who live and work in this city".

The "Sun Ra Revival Post-Krautrock Archestra", formed in Australia during 2014, paid tribute to Sun Ra's philosophies and musical ideas within their albums Realm Beyond Realm and Sun Ra Kills the World.

The Spatial AKA Orchestra, formed in 2006 by Jerry Dammers (the main songwriter of British ska revival band The Specials), was originally created as a tribute to Sun Ra, borrowing many of the ideas, themes and tropes from Sun Ra's own performances.

In 2022, a building at 5626 Morton Street known as the Arkestral Institute of Sun Ra was listed as a historic landmark in the Philadelphia Register of Historic Places. One of its inhabitants, Marshall Allen, known for his work with The Sun Ra Arkestra, began living there in 1968.

The University of Chicago has an extensive collection of Sun Ra's works and personal items in the Special Collections Research Center at the Regenstein Library. The collection was assembled by Ra's business manager Alton Abraham and is open to the public upon request. The Special Collections Research Center has also repeatedly exhibited Sun Ra's work.

== Filmography ==
Space Is the Place (1974) is a feature-length film that stars Sun Ra and his band as themselves. The soundtrack, also by Sun Ra, is available on CD. The film follows Sun Ra after he returns to Chicago from many years of space travel with his Arkestra. In a meeting with "the Overseer" – a devil-like figure stationed in the desert – Sun Ra agrees to play a game of cards to "win" the black community. Sun Ra's goal is to transport the American black community to a new planet he discovered while on his journey, and that he hopes to use as a home for an entirely black population. The artist's mission is to "teleport the whole planet through music", but his attempts are often misunderstood by his supposed converts.

Sun Ra and his Arkestra were the subject of a few documentary films, including Robert Mugge's Sun Ra: A Joyful Noise (1980). It interspersed passages of performances and rehearsals with Sun Ra's commentary on various subjects ranging from today's youth to his own place in the cosmos. More recently, Don Letts' Sun Ra – Brother from Another Planet (2005) incorporated some of Mugge's material, and includes some additional interviews. Points on a Space Age (2009) is a documentary by Ephrahaim Asili. "It's a 60-minute doc along the lines of the talking-head-intercut-with performance clips style."

== Bibliography ==
Sun Ra wrote an enormous number of songs and material regarding his spiritual beliefs and music. A magazine titled Sun Ra Research was published irregularly for many years, providing extensive documentation of Sun Ra's perspectives on many issues. Sun Ra's collected poetry and prose is available as a book, published May 2005, entitled Sun Ra, The Immeasurable Equation. Another book of over 260 of Sun Ra's poems, Sun Ra: Collected Works Vol. 1: Immeasurable Equation was published by Phaelos Books in November 2005. The Wisdom of Sun Ra: Sun Ra's Polemical Broadsheets and Streetcorner Leaflets, was published in book form in 2005, by WhiteWalls. A collection of Sun Ra's poetry, This Planet Is Doomed, was published by Kicks Books in 2011.
