= El Saturn Records =

- Founded: 1957
- Founder: Alton Abraham
- Distributor: Ihnfinity, Inc. (US)
- Genre: Various
- Country of origin: US
- Location: Chicago, Illinois

El Saturn Records is an American record label founded in 1957 by Alton Abraham. Among the earliest African-American-owned record labels, in the late 1950s and 1960s it was one of the most active artist-owned record labels in the United States. The best-known releases by the label are albums by Sun Ra and his groups.

The label is allegedly owned by Ihnfinity Inc., where Anita A. Abraham, daughter of Artis Abraham, is the president.
