= ESP-Disk' discography =

This is the discography of the American ESP-Disk' record label, ordered by ID number of each musical album.

== Discography ==
=== ESP 1000 series ===
Catalog number	Year	Artist	Title	Notes
ESP 1001	1964	Various artists	Ni Kantu en Esperanto	compilation; see: Esperanto
ESP 1002	1965	Albert Ayler	Spiritual Unity	
ESP 1003	1965	Pharoah Sanders Quintet	Pharoah's First	
ESP 1004	1965	New York Art Quartet	New York Art Quartet	
ESP 1005	1965	Byron Allen Trio	Byron Allen Trio	
ESP 1006	1965	Ornette Coleman	Town Hall, 1962	live
ESP 1007	1965	Giuseppi Logan	The Giuseppi Logan Quartet	
ESP 1008	1965	Paul Bley	Barrage	
ESP 1009	1965	Bob James	Explosions	
ESP 1010	1965	Albert Ayler	Bells	live
ESP 1011	1965	Ran Blake	Ran Blake Plays Solo Piano	
ESP 1012	1965	Lowell Davidson Trio	Lowell Davidson Trio	
ESP 1013	1965	Giuseppi Logan	More	
ESP 1014	1965	Sun Ra	The Heliocentric Worlds of Sun Ra, Volume One	
ESP 1015	1965?	Milford Graves	Percussion Ensemble	
ESP 1016	1966	Albert Ayler & Don Cherry	New York Eye and Ear Control	
ESP 1017	1966	Sun Ra	The Heliocentric Worlds of Sun Ra, Volume Two	
ESP 1018	1966	The Fugs	The Fugs First Album	
ESP 1019	1967?	Jean Erdman	The Coach with the Six Insides	
ESP 1020	1965?	Albert Ayler	Spirits Rejoice	live
ESP 1021	1966	Paul Bley Trio	Closer	
ESP 1022	1966	Marion Brown Quartet	Marion Brown Quartet	
ESP 1023	1966	Frank Wright Trio	Frank Wright Trio	
ESP 1024	1965?	Burton Greene Quartet	Burton Greene Quartet	
ESP 1025	1966	Patty Waters	Patty Waters Sings	
ESP 1026	1966	Henry Grimes	The Call	
ESP 1027	1966	Timothy Leary, Ph.D.	Turn On, Tune In, Drop Out	
ESP 1028	1966	The Fugs	The Fugs	
ESP 1029	1966	Charles Tyler Ensemble	Charles Tyler Ensemble	
ESP 1030	1966	Sonny Simmons	Staying on the Watch	
ESP 1031	1966	Noah Howard Quartet	Noah Howard Quartet	
ESP 1032	1966	Sunny Murray	Sunny Murray	
ESP 1033	1966	Various artists	Sampler Vol. I	compilation
ESP 1034	1966	Various artists	East Village Other	see: East Village Other
ESP 1035	1967	Tuli Kupferberg	No Deposit, No Return	
ESP 1036	N/A	Byard Lancaster	(UNISSUED)	(UNISSUED)
ESP 1037	1967	The Godz	Contact High with the Godz	
ESP 1038	1967	The Fugs	Virgin Fugs	
ESP 1039	1966?	Randy Burns	Of Love and War	
ESP 1040	1968	Marion Brown	Why Not?	
ESP 1041	1968	Karl Berger	From Now On	
ESP 1042	1968	Gunter Hampel	Music from Europe	
ESP 1043	1968	Sonny Simmons	Music from the Spheres	
ESP 1044	1968	Marzette Watts	Marzette Watts and Company	
ESP 1045	1970?	Sun Ra	Nothing Is...	live
ESP 1046	N/A	(UNISSUED)	(UNISSUED)	(UNISSUED)
ESP 1047	1967	Godz	Godz 2	
ESP 1048	1967	Alan Sondheim	Ritual-All-7-70	
ESP 1049	1967	Gato Barbieri	In Search of the Mystery	
ESP 1050	1967	William S. Burroughs	Call Me Burroughs	
ESP 1051	1967	Various	ESP Sampler	compilation
ESP 1052	1967	James Zitro	West Coast Music	
ESP 1053	1967	Frank Wright	Your Prayer	
ESP 1054	1967	Pearls Before Swine	One Nation Underground	
ESP 1055	1966?	Patty Waters	College Tour	live
ESP 1056	1967	Movement Soul	Live Recording of Songs and...	live
ESP 1057	1967	Peter Lemer Quintet	Local Colour	
ESP 1058	N/A	Sean Gagnier	(UNISSUED)	(UNISSUED)
ESP 1059	1967	Charles Tyler	Eastern Man Alone	
ESP 1060	1966?	Steve Lacy	The Forest and the Zoo	live
ESP 1061	1967	Jerry Moore	Ballad of Birmingham	AKA Life Is a Constant Journey Home
ESP 1062	N/A	Jacques Coursil	Unit (UNISSUED)	(UNISSUED)
ESP 1063	1968?	New York Electric String Ensemble	New York Electric String Ensemble	
ESP 1064	1968?	Noah Howard	At Judson Hall	live
ESP 1065	1968?	Slavonic Cappella Ensemble	Music from the Orthodox Liturgy	
ESP 1066	1968?	Bud Powell	Blue Note Café Paris 1961	live
ESP 1067 / ORO-5	N/A	HAR-YOU Percussion Group	Sounds of the Ghetto Youth	(UNISSUED); released as ORO-5 (1968)
ESP 1068	1967	The Holy Modal Rounders	Indian War Whoop	
ESP 1069 / ORO-1	N/A	Bruce MacKay	Midnight Minstrel	(UNISSUED); released as ORO-1 (1967)
ESP 1070 / ORO-4	N/A	All That The Name Implies	All That The Name Implies	(UNISSUED); released as ORO-4 (1968)
ESP 1071	N/A	Paul Bley	(UNISSUED)	(UNISSUED); 2xLP
ESP 1072	N/A	Tony Snell	Fungus and Englishmen Abroad	(UNISSUED); released as Englishmen Abroad on Syndicore in 2003?
ESP 1073	N/A	Norman Howard	Burn, Baby, Burn	(UNISSUED); released on Philips in 1993
ESP 1074	1968	Burton Greene Trio	The Burton Greene Trio on Tour	AKA On Tour
ESP 1075	1968	Pearls Before Swine	Balaklava	
ESP 1076	1968	Nedly Elstak Trio + Voice	The Machine	
ESP 1077	1968	The Godz	The Third Testament	
ESP 1078	1968	The Seventh Sons	Raga (4:00 A.M. at Frank's)	live? at Frank's home studio
ESP 1079	N/A	(UNISSUED)	(UNISSUED)	(UNISSUED)
ESP 1080	1968	Karel Velebný	SHQ	
ESP 1081	1968	Various artists	An Evening at Home with ESP	compilation
ESP 1082	1968	Alan Sondheim	T'Other Little Tune	
ESP 1083	1968	Free Music Quintet	Free Music One and Two	
ESP 1084	N/A	(UNISSUED)	(UNISSUED)	(UNISSUED)
ESP 1085	1968	Lou Killen	Sea Chanteys	
ESP 1086	N/A	(UNISSUED)	(UNISSUED)	(UNISSUED)
ESP 1087	N/A	(UNISSUED)	(UNISSUED)	(UNISSUED)
ESP 1088	N/A	(UNISSUED)	(UNISSUED)	(UNISSUED)
ESP 1089	1968	Randy Burns	Evening of the Magician	
ESP 1090	N/A	(UNISSUED)	(UNISSUED)	(UNISSUED)
ESP 1091	1969?	Alan Silva	Skillfulness	
ESP 1092	1968	Ed Askew	Ask the Unicorn	
ESP 1093	N/A	(UNISSUED)	(UNISSUED)	(UNISSUED)
ESP 1094	N/A	(UNISSUED)	(UNISSUED)	(UNISSUED)
ESP 1095	1968	Levitts / Various artists	We Are the Levitts	2xLP; studio album/compilation; includes An Evening at Home with ESP (ESP 1081)
ESP 1096	N/A	(UNISSUED)	(UNISSUED)	(UNISSUED)
ESP 1097 / ORO 6	N/A	Todd Kelley	Folksinger (?)	(UNISSUED); released as Todd Kelley as ORO-6
ESP 1098	1969	MIJ	Yodeling Astrologer	
ESP 1099	1968?	Erica Pomerance	You Used to Think	AKA Surreal
ESP 1111	1993	Various artists	Boots 'n Roots	compilation; issued by ZYX/ESP (Germany)

=== ESP 2000 series ===
Catalog number	Year	Artist	Title	Notes
ESP 2000	1969	Octopus	Rock-New Music Fusion	
ESP 2001	1969	Cromagnon	Elliot/Grasmere Connecticut Tribe	AKA Cave Rock/Orgasm
ESP 2002-2	1993	Jayne County	Goddess of Wet Dreams	originally unissued; issued by ZYX/ESP (Germany)
ESP 2003	1970?	Charles Manson and the Family Sing 13 Songs	Lie: The Love and Terror Cult	
ESP 2004	1970?	Sweet Pie with Bill Mahoney	Pleasure Pudding: Livid at Fat City	
ESP 2005-2	1993	Barry Titus	Do Wappa Do	originally unissued; issued by ZYX/ESP (Germany)
ESP 2006	1970	Emerson's Old Timey Custard-Suckin' Band	Emerson's Old Timey Custard-Suckin' Band	
ESP 2007	1970	Randy Burns	Songs for an Uncertain Lady	
ESP 2008-2	1993	Joel Tobias	God Is Watching America	originally unissued; issued by ZYX/ESP (Germany)
ESP 2009-2	1993	Barry Titus	42nd Street	originally unissued; issued by ZYX/ESP (Germany)
ESP 2010-2	1993	Woodstock Workband	Armed and Dangerous	originally unissued; issued by ZYX/ESP (Germany)
ESP 2011	N/A	(UNISSUED)	(UNISSUED)	(UNISSUED)
ESP 2012	N/A	Woodstock Band	Sword in the Hand	(UNISSUED)
ESP 2013-2	1994?	Jimi Lalumia & the Psychotic Frogs	Gr. Hits: Live at Max's Kansas City 1981	live; originally unissued; issued by ZYX/ESP (Germany)
ESP 2014	N/A	(UNISSUED)	(UNISSUED)	(UNISSUED)
ESP 2015	N/A	Don Moore	In the Groove	(UNISSUED)
ESP 2016-2	1993	Don Moore	Party Goin' On in Woodstock	live; originally unissued; issued by ZYX/ESP (Germany)
ESP 2017	1970	The Godz	Godzundheit	
ESP 2018	1975?	The Fugs & the Holy Modal Rounders	Fugs 4, Rounders Score	
ESP 2019	N/A	(UNISSUED)	(UNISSUED)	(UNISSUED)
ESP 2020-2	1993	Les visible	Too Old to Rock and Roll	originally unissued; issued by ZYX/ESP (Germany)
ESP 2021-2	1993	Les visible & the Critical List Band	Jews from Outer Space	originally unissued; issued by ZYX/ESP (Germany)
ESP 2022–2043	N/A	(UNISSUED)	(UNISSUED)	(UNISSUED)
ESP 2044-2	1993	Various artists	Woodstock: Moods and Moments	originally unissued; issued by Prism (SP404, 1975) and ZYX/ESP (Germany, 1993/2004)
ESP 2045–2050	N/A	(UNISSUED)	(UNISSUED)	(UNISSUED)
ESP 2051	1970	Various artists	ESP Sampler	promotional only
ESP 2052–2099	N/A	(UNISSUED)	(UNISSUED)	(UNISSUED)
ESP 2222	N/A	Various artists	An ESP Disk Guide To Funky Soul & Acid Jazz, Vol.1	compilation; issued 1993 as ZYX/ESP 2222-2 (Germany)

=== ESP 3000 series ===
Catalog number	Year	Artist	Title	Notes
ESP 3000	N/A	Charlie Parker	The Comprehensive Charlie Parker: Live Performances, Volume I	live; issued 1972 as ESP-BIRD-1
ESP 3001	N/A	Charlie Parker	Broadcast Performances 1948–1949: Vol. 2 of 14 Volumes	live; issued 1973 as ESP-BIRD-2
ESP 3002	1970	Billie Holiday	Lady Lives, Volume 1: Broadcast Performances 1949-1953	live; also released with Sampler – ESP Is 3D! Superstereo (ESP 2051)
ESP 3003	1972	Billie Holiday	Radio & TV Broadcasts, Volume 2: 1953–56	live; AKA Lady Lives, Vol. 2
ESP 3004	1973	Tony Snell	Medieval & Latter Day Lays	
ESP 3005	N/A	Tony Kelly	Busker Boy	(UNISSUED)
ESP 3005-2	1993	Billie Holiday	Broadcast Performances, Vol. 3	live; ZYX/ESP (Germany) reissue of ESP 3006
ESP 3006	1973	Billie Holiday	Broadcast Performances, Volume 3: 1956–1958	live
ESP 3006-2	1993	Billie Holiday	Broadcast Performances, Vol. 4	live; originally unissued; issued by ZYX/ESP (Germany)
ESP 3007	1973	Revolutionary Ensemble	Vietnam	live
ESP 3008	1974?	Jim McCarthy	Alien	
ESP 3008-2	1993	The Godz	Alien	ZYX/ESP (Germany) reissue of ESP 3008
ESP 3009	1973	The Captain Matchbox Whoopee Band	Smoke Dreams	
ESP 3009-2	1993	Tiger Tiger	Sun Country	
ESP 3010	1973	The Captain Matchbox Whoopee Band	"My Canary Has Circles Under His Eyes" b/w "Nagasaki"	7" single
ESP 3011-2	1993	Marc Black	Big Dong Dharma!	originally unissued; issued by ZYX/ESP (Germany)
ESP 3012-2	1993	Rolf Kempf	Woodstock Album	live?; originally unissued; issued by ZYX/ESP (Germany)
ESP 3013	1973	Frank Lowe	Black Beings	
ESP 3014	N/A	Peter Stampfel & Luke Faust	Wendigo Dwain Story	(UNISSUED)
ESP 3015	N/A	Nadolski	New Music from Poland 1	(UNISSUED)
ESP 3016	N/A	Niemen Enigmatic	New Music from Poland 2	(UNISSUED)
ESP 3017	1974	Lester Young	Newly Discovered Performances, Vol. 1	live
ESP 3018	1974	The Sea Ensemble	We Move Together	
ESP 3019	1974	Thornton, Fradkin & Unger and the Big Band	Pass on This Side	
ESP 3019-2	1993	The Godz	Godz Bless California	originally unissued; issued by ZYX/ESP (Germany)
ESP 3020	1975	Bill Horwitz	Lies, Lies, Lies	
ESP 3021-2	1993	Bud Powell	Winter Broadcasts 1953	live; originally unissued; issued by ZYX/ESP (Germany)
ESP 3022-2	1993	Bud Powell	Spring Broadcasts 1953	live; originally unissued; issued by ZYX/ESP (Germany)
ESP 3023	N/A	Masayuki Takayanagi New Direction Unit	April Is the Cruellest Month	(UNISSUED); AKA New Music from Japan
ESP 3023-2	1993	Bud Powell	Summer Broadcasts 1953	live; originally unissued; issued by ZYX/ESP (Germany)
ESP 3024-2	N/A	Bud Powell	Autumn Broadcasts 1953	live
ESP 3025	N/A	Anton Bruhin	New Music from Switzerland	(UNISSUED)
ESP 3026	1975	Ronnie Boykins	The Will Come, Is Now	live; reissued as Ronnie Boykins
ESP 3027	N/A	(UNISSUED)	(UNISSUED)	(UNISSUED)
ESP 3028-2	1993	Michael Gregory Jackson	Clarity	originally unissued; issued by ZYX/ESP (Germany)
ESP 3029-2	1993	Sorgen/Rust/Windbiel Trio	Outlet	originally unissued; issued by ZYX/ESP (Germany)
ESP 3030	1975	Albert Ayler	Prophecy	live
ESP 3031-2	1994?	Albert Ayler	At Slug's Saloon, Vol. 1	live; originally unissued; issued by ZYX/ESP (Germany)
ESP 3032-2	1994?	Albert Ayler	At Slug's Saloon, Vol. 2	live; originally unissued; issued by ZYX/ESP (Germany)
ESP 3033-2	1993	Sun Ra	Concert for the Comet Kohoutek	live; originally unissued; issued by ZYX/ESP (Germany)
ESP 3034–3099	N/A	(UNISSUED)	(UNISSUED)	(UNISSUED)

=== ESP 4000 series ===
Catalog number	Year	Artist	Title	Notes
ESP 4000	2004	Ellis Marsalis Jr.	Ruminations in New York	
ESP 4001	2005	Albert Ayler	Live on the Riviera	live
ESP 4002	2005	Sun Ra	Heliocentric Worlds, Vol. 3: The Lost Tapes	
ESP 4003	2005	Pearls Before Swine	The Complete ESP-Disk' Recordings	compilation
ESP 4004	N/A	(UNISSUED)	(UNISSUED)	(UNISSUED)
ESP 4005	2005	Sun Ra	Heliocentric Worlds, Volumes 1 & 2	compiles ESP 1014 (1965) and ESP 1017 (1966)
ESP 4006	2005	Albert Ayler	Bells/Prophecy	live; compilation
ESP 4007	2005	Frank Wright	The Complete ESP-Disk' Recordings	2xCD; compilation
ESP 4008	2005	Pharoah Sanders Quintet	Pharaoh Sanders Quintet	reissue of Pharoah's First (ESP 1003, 1965)
ESP 4009	N/A	(UNISSUED)	(UNISSUED)	(UNISSUED)
ESP 4010	N/A	(UNISSUED)	(UNISSUED)	(UNISSUED)
ESP 4011	2005	Marion Brown	Marion Brown	reissue of Marion Brown Quartet (ESP 1022, 1966)
ESP 4012	2006	Sonny Simmons	The Complete ESP-Disk' Recordings	2xCD; compiles ESP 1030, ESP 1043 with interviews
ESP 4013–4018	N/A	(UNISSUED)	(UNISSUED)	(UNISSUED)
ESP 4019	2005	Patty Waters	The Complete ESP-Disk' Recordings	compilation
ESP 4020–4024	N/A	(UNISSUED)	(UNISSUED)	(UNISSUED)
ESP 4024	2005	Sun Ra	Nothing Is...	expanded reissue of ESP 1045
ESP 4025	2005	Albert Ayler	Slug's Saloon	live; 2xCD
ESP 4026	2006	Sun Ra	Heliocentric Worlds, Vol. 1–2	compilation; reissue of ESP 4005 (1965) with bonus tracks
ESP 4027	N/A	(UNISSUED)	(UNISSUED)	(UNISSUED)
ESP 4028	2006	Frank Wright	Unity	live
ESP 4029	2006	Yma Sumac	Recital: Live in Bucharest, Romania 1961	live
ESP 4030	2006	New Ghost	Live Upstairs at Nick's	live
ESP 4031	2006	Hans Tammen, Alfred 23 Harth, Chris Dahlgren, Jay Rosen	Live at the Knitting Factory – Expedition	live
ESP 4032	2007	Don Cherry	Live at Café Montmartre 1966	live; CD+DVD; DVD label sampler Smorgasbord Vorspeise Appetizers
ESP 4033	2007	Norman Howard/Joe Phillips	Burn Baby Burn	
ESP 4034	2007	Various artists	Movement Soul, Volume 2	
ESP 4035	2007	Albert Ayler	The Hilversum Session	
ESP 4036	2007	Bud Powell	Live at the Blue Note Cafe, Paris 1961	live
ESP 4037	2007	Sunny Murray	Sunny Murray	
ESP 4038	2007	Burton Greene	Bloom in the Commune	
ESP 4039	2007	Billie Holiday	Rare Live Recordings 1953–1959	live
ESP 4040	2007	Lester Young	Live at Birdland 1953 & 1956	live
ESP 4041	2007	Lindha Kallerdahl	Gold	
ESP 4042	2008	Alan Roth/Various artists	Inside Out in the Open: An Expressionist Journey into the World Known as Free Jazz	double-sided DVD; documentary; directed by Alan Roth
ESP 4043	2008	Don Cherry	Live at Café Montmartre 1966, Volume Two	live
ESP 4044	2008	Yuganaut	This Musicship	
ESP 4045	2008	The Holy Modal Rounders	Live in 65	live
ESP 4046	2008	Totem	Solar Forge	
ESP 4047	2008	Yximalloo	Unpop	
ESP 4048	2008	Chris Speed, Chris Cheek, Stephane Furic Leibovici	Jugendstil	
ESP 4049	2008	Barnacled	Charles	
ESP 4050	2008	Charlie Parker	Bird in Time: 1940–1947	4xCD boxset; compilation
ESP 4051	2009	Don Cherry	Live at Café Montmartre, Vol. Three	live
ESP 4052	2009	Flow Trio	Rejuvenation	
ESP 4053	2009	The Naked Future	Gigantomachia	
ESP 4054	2009	Sun Ra Featuring Pharoah Sanders & Black Harold	Sun Ra Featuring Pharoah Sanders & Black Harold	
ESP 4055	2009	Talibam!	Boogie in the Breeze Blocks	
ESP 4056	2009	Joe Morris	Colorfield	
ESP 4057	2009	TSIGOTI	PrivatePovertySpeaksToThePeopleOfTheParty	
ESP 4058	2010	Paul Dunmall & Chris Corsano	Identical Sunsets	
ESP 4059	2010	Konitz, Cheek, Furic Leibovici	Jugendstil II	
ESP 4060	2010	Sun Ra	College Tour Volume One: The Complete Nothing Is...	live; 2xCD; expanded reissue of ESP 1045
ESP 4061	2010	Eli Keszler	Oxtirn	
ESP 4062	2010	Sun Ra	Heliocentric Worlds, Vols. 1–3	compiles ESP 1014 (1965), ESP 1017 (1966) and ESP 4002 (2005)
ESP 4063	2010	Joe Morris	Camera	
ESP 4064	N/A	(UNISSUED)	(UNISSUED)	(UNISSUED)
ESP 4065	2010	Talibam!	Cosmoplitude 7"	7"; also issued as ESP-ORO 6
ESP 4066	2012	Frank Lowe	The Loweski	
ESP 4067	N/A	(UNISSUED)	(UNISSUED)	(UNISSUED)
ESP 4068	2012	Frank Wright Quartet	Blues for Albert Ayler	
ESP 4069	2012	Pharoah Sanders	In the Beginning: 1963–64	4xCD boxset; compilation
ESP 4070	2012	The Charles Gayle Trio	Look Up	live
ESP 4071	2012?	Oscar Brown Jr. & Maggie Brown	We're Live	live; possibly unreleased reissue
ESP 4072	2012?	Various artists	The Albert Ayler Story	compilation; possibly unreleased
ESP 4073	2013	Bud Powell	Birdland 1953	live; 3xCD
ESP 4074	N/A	(UNISSUED)	(UNISSUED)	(UNISSUED)
ESP 4075	2016	Last Exit	Iron Path	
ESP 4076	2015?	Albert Ayler	Bells/Prophecy – Expanded Edition	live; 2xCD; compilation
ESP 4077	N/A	(UNISSUED)	(UNISSUED)	(UNISSUED)
ESP 4078	2016	Masahiro Shimba, Bill Laswell	Risurrezione – Dubopera	
ESP 4079	N/A	(UNISSUED)	(UNISSUED)	(UNISSUED)
ESP 4080	N/A	(UNISSUED)	(UNISSUED)	(UNISSUED)
ESP 4081	N/A	(UNISSUED)	(UNISSUED)	(UNISSUED)
ESP 4082	2023	Matthew Shipp Trio	Circular Temple	reissue of Circular Temple (Quinton, QTN1, 1992)
ESP 4083	2026-11-06	Matthew Shipp Duo with William Parker	Zo	reissue of Zo (Rise, RR-126, 1994)
ESP 4084	2023-10-27	Alon Nechushtan, Roy Campbell, Daniel Carter, Sabir Mateen, William Parker, Federico Ughi	For Those Who Cross the Seas	2xCD; live
ESP 4085–4099	N/A	(UNISSUED)	(UNISSUED)	(UNISSUED)
ESP 4111	?	Various artists	ESP New Artist Sampler 2008	compilation; possibly unissued

=== ESP 5000 series ===
Catalog number	Year	Artist	Title	Notes
5001	2012	Various artists	ESP-Disk' Fire Music Vol. 1: A High Energy Avant Garde Jazz Compilation	sampler; compilation
5002	2013	Arborea	Fortress of the Sun	
5003	2013	Tiger Hatchery	Sun Worship	
5004	2014	Alan Sondheim with Christopher Diasparra & Edward Schneider	Cutting Board	
5005	2015-01-01	Extremely Serious Business	Headwall	
5006	2015-01-01	John D. Thomas	Serious Business	
5007	2015	The Uppercut: Matthew Shipp Mat Walerian Duo	Live at Okuden	live
5008	2016	Defunkt	Live at Channel Zero	live
5009	2016-04-29	Jungle: Mat Walerian, Matthew Shipp, Hamid Drake	Live at Okuden	live; 2xCD
5010	2018	Matt Lavelle/Reggie Sylvester	Retrograde	
5011	2017-05-15	Toxic: Mat Walerian/Matthew Shipp/William Parker	This Is Beautiful Because We Are Beautiful People	
5012	2016-12-02	Thollem McDonas, Mad King Edmund	Happening	
5013	2017	Tiger Hatchery	Breathing in the Walls	
5014	2016	Buck Curran	Immortal Light	also issued as OR 002
5015	2017-09-22	Talibam!/Matt Nelson/Ron Stabinsky	HARD VIBE	
5016	2017	Talibam!	Endgame of the Anthropocene	
5017	2017-11-16	The Delegation	Evergreen (Canceled World)	
5018	2018	Matthew Shipp Quartet Featuring Mat Walerian	Sonic Fiction	
5019	2017-11-17	Stephen Dydo, Alan Sondheim	Dragon and Phoenix	
5020	2018	Thollem/DuRoche/Stjames Trio	Live in Our Time	live July 11, 2015 at Tabor Space; Portland, Oregon
5021	2017	Amina Baraka & the Red Microphone	Amina Baraka & the Red Microphone	
5022	2018	Matthew Shipp	Zer0	2xCD; with lecture bonus disc
5023	2018	Megumi Yonezawa/Masa Kamaguchi/Ken Kobayashi	Boundary	
5024	2018-04	Robbie Basho	Live in Forlì, Italy 1982	live; also issued as OR 005
5025	2018-07-27	Fay Victor's SoundNoiseFUNK with Joe Morris, Sam Newsome, Reggie Nicholson	Wet Robots	
5026	2020-05-26	Whit Dickey	Morph	2xCD
5027	2018	Gabriel Zucker	Weighting	
5028	2018	Buck Curran	Morning Haikus, Afternoon Ragas	also issued as OR 006
5029	2019-02-15	Matthew Shipp Trio	Signature	
5030	2018	Mars Williams	Mars Williams Presents: An Ayler Xmas, Vol. 2	live
5031	2019-12-01	Peter Lemer Quintet	Son of Local Colour	live February 20, 2018 at the PizzaExpress Jazz Club
5032	2019-11	Painted Faces	Tales from the Skinny Apartment	
5033	2019	Various artists	New Improvised Music from Buenos Aires	
5034	2019	Allen Lowe, Jews & Roots	An Avant-Garde of Our Own – Disconnected Words: 1980–2018	8xCD boxset
5035	2019	Radical Empathy Trio	Reality and Other Imaginary Places	Thollem McDonas, Nels Cline, Michael Wimberly
5036	2019-20-25	Ivo Perelman, Matthew Shipp, William Parker, Bobby Kapp	Ineffable Joy	
5037	2020-07-31	Okuden: Mat Walerian/Matthew Shipp/William Parker/Hamid Drake	Every Dog Has Its Day But It Doesn't Matter Because Fat Cat Is Getting Fatter	2xCD
5038	2020-01-31	Thollem/Parker/Cline	Gowanus Sessions II	
5039	2020-09-18	Matthew Shipp Trio	The Unidentifiable	
5040	2021-03-26	Flow Trio with Joe McPhee	Winter Garden	
5041	N/A	(UNISSUED)	(UNISSUED)	(UNISSUED)
5042	2000-10-30	Fay Victor's SoundNoiseFUNK	We've Had Enough	
5043–5046	N/A	(UNISSUED)	(UNISSUED)	(UNISSUED)
5047	2023-12-01	Guillermo Gregorio	Two Trios	
5048	2021	ATTITUDE!	Pause and Effect	
5049	2000-09-04	Silke Eberhard & Nikolaus Neuser with Talibam!	This Week Is in Two Weeks	LP, Germany exclusive?
5050	2020-06-26	Owl Xounds Exploding Galaxy	The Coalescence	Adam Kriney, Gene Janas, Shayna Dulberger, Mario Rechtern
5051	2022-06-17	Raymond Byron	Bond Wire Cur	AKA Raymond Raposa
5052	2021-06-25	Ochs–Robinson Duo	A Civil Right	Larry Ochs and Donald Robinson
5053	2021-06-25	Michael Bisio/Kirk Knuffke/Fred Lonberg-Holm	The Art Spirit	
5054	2021-10-15	GULFH of Berlin	GULFH of Berlin	
5055	2021-10-16	OPTO S	Human Indictive / Live	live
5056	2020-09-27	Buck Curran	No Love Is Sorrow	also released as OR 008
5057	2020-10-30	Alan Sondheim & Azure Carter	Plaguesong	
5058	2023-04-28	Painted Faces	Normal Street	
5059	2022-06-17	Matthew Shipp Trio	World Construct	
5060	2021-10-22	Bridge of Flowers	A Soft Day’s Night	
5061	2021-11	Rova Saxophone Quartet	The Circumference of Reason	
5062	2023-09-04	John Blum	Nine Rivers	live at the Crosscurrent Festival, September 14, 2013
5063	2024-02-09	Thollem	Worlds in a Life, One	
5064	2021	East Axis	Cool with That	
5065	2021-06-25	Duck Baker	Confabulations	
5066	2021-04-03	The Red Microphone	And I Became of the Dark...	
5067	2021-10-29	William Parker, Patricia Nicholson	No Joke!	
5068	2021-09-24	Eunhye Jeong	NOLDA	
5069	2021-07-24	Gabriel Zucker, The Delegation	Leftover Beats from the Edges of Time	
5070	2022-10-28	Perelman, Shipp	Fruition	Ivo Perelman and Matthew Shipp
5071	2024-04-05	Thollem	Worlds in a Life, Two	Tholem McDonas
5072	2022-06-17	Jones Jones	Just Justice	
5073	2022-06-17	WeFreeStrings	Love in the Form of Sacred Outrage	
5074	2022-10-28	Michael Marcus	Abstractions in Lime Caverns	
5075	2024	Buck Curran	One Evening and Other Folk Songs	also released as OR 015
5076	2023	Alan Sondheim	Galut: Ballads of Wadi-Sabi	
5078	2022-09-30	The Red Microphone	A Bleeding in Black Leather	
5079	2024-11-15	R*Time	It's Now: R*Time Plays Doug Hammond	
5080	2023	Allen Lowe & the Constant Sorrow Orchestra	In the Dark	3xCD box set
5081	2023-01-27	Bára Gísladóttir	SILVA	
5082	2023	Allen Lowe & the Constant Sorrow Orchestra	America: The Rough Cut	live?
5083	2022-07-06	Paul R. Harding, Michael Bisio, Juma Sultan	They Tried to Kill Me Yesterday	limited edition
5084	2025	Joe Morris, Elliott Sharp	Realism	
5085	2024-04-05	Matthew Shipp Trio	New Concepts in Piano Trio Jazz	
5086	2026-06-26	GULF of Berlin	For Timothy	
5088	2024-10-18	Thollem McDonas	Infinite-Sum Game	
5089	2025-01-31	Wolf Eyes x Anthony Braxton	Live at Pioneer Works, 26 October 2023	live
5094	2026-10-09	Joe Morris/Jonathan Paik/James Paul Nadien	Dispersion	
5095	2025-03-14	Jeong / Bisio Duo	Morning Bells Whistle Bright	Eunhye Jeong & Michael Bisio
5096	2024-10-18	Paper Jays	Paper Jays	
5099	2024-06-07	Frank London, The Elders	Spirit Stronger than Blood	
5100	2024-11-01	Duck Baker	Breakdown Lane (Free Solos & Duos 1976–1998)	compilation
5101	2025-08-29	Buck Curran	Far Driven Sun	also issued as OR ???
5102	2025-01-03	Deepstaria Enigmatica	The Eternal Now Is the Heart of a New Tomorrow	
5103	2026-05-15	Entropic Hop	The Quest for the Normal Is the Death of the Self	Aron Namenwirth, Ayumi Ishito, Kevin Shea
5104	2025-07-25	Jeff, Unfortunately	Bridge Over Troubled Flowers	
5105	2026-10-23	Rova	those who...	
5106	2025-04-11	Larry Ochs, Joe Morris, Charles Downs	Every Day → All The Way	
5108	2026-07-17	Gebhard Ullmann/Steve Swell/Joe Morris/Charles Downs	Coffee and Berries	
5109	2024	Allen Lowe and the Constant Sorrow Orchestra	Louis Armstrong's America Volume 1	2xCD
5110	2024	Allen Lowe and the Constant Sorrow Orchestra	Louis Armstrong's America Volume 2	2xCD
5111	2024-12-20	Rose Tang & Patrick Golden	A White Horse Is Not a Horse	
5112	2026-06-26	Michael Marcus Quartet	Next Stop Down	
5120	2026-10-09	Allen Lowe	I Should Have Stayed Dead	3xCD
5122	2026-10-09	Thollem McDonas	DoReMiAntiFa Symphony	
5123	2026-10-26	Rose Tang/Alex Lozupone/Aria Nguyen/Sara Wentworth	Rage Against GRape	EP

== ESPBOX series ==
Catalog number	Year	Artist	Title	Notes
ESPBOX 001	2006	Albert Ayler	The Complete ESP-Disk' Recordings	4xCD; compiles ESP 1002, ESP 1010, ESP 1016 & ESP 1020
ESPBOX 002	2006	Sun Ra	The Complete ESP-Disk' Recordings	4xCD; compiles ESP 1014, ESP 1017, ESP 1045 & ESP 3033

== Contempo ESP-Disk' series ==
Catalog number	Year	Artist	Title	Notes
C05001LP	2016-03-23	Various artists	The ESP-Disk Story Vol. I	
C05002LP	2016-03-23	Various artists	The ESP-Disk Story Vol. II	
