= Other Planes of There =

Studio album by Sun Ra and his Solar Arkestra
- Released: c.1966
- Recorded: 1964, New York
- Genre: Avant-garde jazz
- Length: 47.37
- Label: Saturn; Evidence
- Producer: Alton Abraham

Sun Ra and his Solar Arkestra chronology
When Angels Speak of Love (1963)	Other Planes of There (1966)	The Heliocentric Worlds of Sun Ra, Volume One (1965)

Professional ratings
Review scores
Source	Rating
AllMusic	4/5 stars
DownBeat	4.5/5 stars
The Penguin Guide to Jazz Recordings	4/4 stars
Rolling Stone	4/5 stars
Spin Alternative Record Guide	7/10

Other Planes of There is an album by the American jazz musician Sun Ra and his Solar Arkestra. Recorded in 1964, the album had been released by 1966 on Sun Ra's own Saturn label. The record was reissued on compact disc by Evidence in 1992.

'Granted, the selection is certainly not as abrasive and demanding as later efforts, although there is strident involvement from everyone within the dense arrangement. The brass and reed sections provide emphasis behind an off-kilter and loping waltz backdrop. All the more impressive is how well the material has held up over the decades. Even to seasoned ears, the music is pungent and uninhibited, making Other Planes of There a highly recommended collection.' Lindsay Planer

== The New Thing ==
Shortly after Other Planes of There had been recorded, the painter/musician Bill Dixon and the filmmaker Peter Sabino started to present concerts at the Cellar Cafe, a coffeehouse on West 91st Street, New York. They booked Sun Ra on June 15, who turned up with a 15-piece Arkestra. The crowd that turned up for this concert, and one for Archie Shepp, persuaded the promoters to instigate a four-night festival of the 'New Thing', which would later become defined as free jazz. Without advertising—or electricity—Dixon organised over 40 musical acts, including John Tchicai, Cecil Taylor, Roswell Rudd and Jimmy Giuffre. Whilst there were no mainstream reviews, word slowly spread that jazz had 'announced the arrival of its modernism.'

Sun Ra always distanced the Arkestra from free jazz: "My music is the music of precision. I know exactly the rhythm that must animate my music, and only this rhythm is valid, I have in my mind a complete image of my work..." But he benefitted enormously from the new interest these concerts generated. As well as being among the first to join the resulting Jazz Composers Guild (a cooperative aiming to bring the new music to the public), the Arkestra continued to play increasingly high-profile concerts throughout the winter of 1964. One of these, with the John Tchicai-Roswell Rudd Quartet, on New Year's Eve 1964 (featuring Pharoah Sanders, who was subbing for John Gilmore, and Black Harold), was reviewed for The Nation:

'They present a reviewer with a difficult problem, how to render a sympathetic appraisal for what was one of the more exciting series without making this group seem either utterly insane or sickeningly corny?... [Sun Ra's philosophy] leads him to some really wild and original effects in his music, though it sometimes gets in the way, as when the musicians start talking in the middle of the piece about getting off at Jupiter and about martian water lilies. yet in these instances the spoken word itself will have a musical value, as Sun Ra's concept is well worked out, though the words will have no literary value to anyone except Sun Ra's people. His musicians were in African costumes, and they did a great deal of walking around under blinking, multi-colored lights... Yet, yet... well, you had to be there.' AB Spellman

One person in the audience at the Cellar Cafe sessions was Bernard Stollman, a lawyer and proponent of Esperanto, who was so overwhelmed by the new music that he dreamed up a plan to record all of the artists working within the new style for his label ESP-Disk. First up was Albert Ayler's Spiritual Unity, followed by albums by Ornette Coleman, Pharoah Sanders and the Fugs. Sun Ra would record the first of his contributions to the label on April 20, 1965: The Heliocentric Worlds of Sun Ra, Volume One.

== Track listing ==
=== 12" vinyl ===
All songs by Sun Ra
Side A

1. "Other Planes of There" (22.01)

Side B

1. "Sound Spectra/Spec Sket" (7.39)
2. "Sketch" (4.46)
3. "Pleasure" (3.10)
4. "Spiral Galaxy" (10.01)

== Musicians ==
- Sun Ra - piano
- Walter Miller - trumpet
- Ali Hassan - trombone
- Teddy Nance - trombone
- Bernard Pettaway - bass trombone
- Marshall Allen - alto sax, oboe, percussion
- Danny Davis - alto sax, flute
- John Gilmore - tenor sax
- Pat Patrick - baritone saxophone
- Robert Cummings - bass clarinet
- Ronnie Boykins - bass
- Roger Blank - drums
- Lex Humphries - drums
- Tommy Hunter - engineer

Recorded at the Choreographer's Workshop, New York (the Arkestra's rehearsal space), in 1964.
