= Nothing Is... =

Live album by Sun Ra
- Released: 1970
- Recorded: May 1966
- Genre: Jazz
- Length: 39:42 (original release)
- Label: ESP-Disk; ESP 1045; ESP 4024 (2005 reissue); ESP 4060 (2010 reissue: College Tour Volume One: The Complete Nothing Is...)

Sun Ra chronology
| The Heliocentric Worlds of Sun Ra, Volume Two (1965) | Nothing Is... (1970) | Strange Strings (1966) |

Nothing Is... is a live album by the American composer, bandleader and keyboardist Sun Ra, recorded in 1966 and released on the ESP-Disk label in 1970. In 2010 ESP-Disk released College Tour Volume One: The Complete Nothing Is... an expanded 2xCD edition, restoring the full concert on disc one and adding part of the second set and some tracks from the sound check on disc two.

== Reception ==
The AllMusic review by Lindsay Planer stated: "Sun Ra and his Arkestra issued only a handful of titles on the groundbreaking indie ESP-Disk label. Each title respectively contains some of their most expressive musical statements to date".

Professional ratings
Review scores
| Source | Rating |
|---|---|
| AllMusic | 4.5/5 stars |
| The Rolling Stone Jazz Record Guide | 5/5 stars |
| Spin Alternative Record Guide | 9/10 |

== Track listing ==
All compositions by Sun Ra

=== Original LP ===
==== Side A ====
1. "Dancing Shadows" – 9:50
2. "Imagination" – 1:53
3. "Exotic Forest" – 9:50

==== Side B ====
1. "Sun Ra and His Band from Outer Space" – 1:58
2. "Shadow World" – 13:48
3. "Theme of the Stargazers" – 0:40
4. "Outer Spaceways Incorporated" – 1:42
5. "Next Stop Mars" – 0:38

- Track lengths on cover differ significantly from actual playing times given above.
- This version is also available on CD (without the bonus tracks below) as ZYX/ESP 1045-2.

=== 2005 CD bonus tracks ===
9. "Velvet" – 7:20
10. "Outer Nothingness" – 15:43
11. "We Travel the Spaceways" – 1:30

- Recorded live on tour of New York state colleges May 18, 1966.

=== College Tour Volume One: The Complete Nothing Is... ===
==== Disc one (05/18/1966 – first set) ====
1. "Sun Ra and His Band from Outer Space" – 14:02
2. "The Shadow World" – 4:40
3. "Interpolation" – 2:18
4. "The Satellites Are Spinning" – 1:17
5. "Advice to Medics" – 2:50
6. "Velvet" – 8:16
7. "Space Aura" – 10:26
8. "The Exotic Forest" – 9:43
9. "Theme of the Stargazers" – 1:52
10. "Outer Spaceways Incorporated" – 2:24
11. "Dancing Shadows" – 9:45
12. "Imagination" – 0:40
13. "The Second Stop Is Jupiter" – 1:12
14. "Next Stop Mars" – 0:41

==== Disc two (05/18/1966 – partial second set and sound check) ====
1. "The Satellites Are Spinning" – 9:08
2. "Velvet" – 7:10
3. "Interplanetary Chaos" – 4:35
4. "Theme of the Stargazers" – 1:30
5. "The Second Stop Is Jupiter" – 11:16
6. "We Travel the Spaceways" – 1:42
7. "Nothing Is" – 6:13
8. "It Is Eternal" – 12:37
9. "State Street" – 8:21
10. The Exotic Forest" – 4:32

== Personnel ==
- Sun Ra – piano, clavioline
- Ali Hassan, Teddy Nance – trombone
- Marshall Allen – alto saxophone, flute, piccolo, oboe
- John Gilmore – tenor saxophone
- Pat Patrick – baritone saxophone, flute
- Robert Cummings – bass clarinet
- James Jacson – flute, log drums
- Ronnie Boykins – bass, tuba
- Clifford Jarvis, Roger Blank, Jimmy Johnson – drum
- Carl S. Malone, Nimrod Hunt – sun horn, gong
