= Strange Strings =

Studio album by Sun Ra and his Astro Infinity Arkestra
- Released: 1967
- Recorded: 1965, New York
- Genre: Jazz
- Label: Saturn; Atavistic
- Producer: Alton Abraham

Sun Ra and his Astro Infinity Arkestra chronology
Nothing Is (1966)	Strange Strings (1967)	Monorails and Satellites (1966)

Strange Strings is an album by the American Jazz musician Sun Ra and his Astro Infinity Arkestra. Recorded in 1965, the album was released in 1967 on Sun Ra's own Saturn label. The record was reissued on compact disc by Atavistic in 2007.

Strange Strings is an oddity in Sun Ra's often discography, featuring his band members performing on string instruments they'd never before used.

== A study in ignorance ==
After finishing a series of concerts at New York State colleges sponsored by ESP, Sun Ra decided to assemble a number of stringed instruments bought from curio shops and music stores. Ukuleles, Mandolins, Kotos, Koras, Chinese Lutes and 'Moon Guitars' were handed out to his reed and horn players in the belief that 'strings could touch people in a special way, different from other instruments.' The point was that the Arkestra didn't know how to play them - Sun Ra called it 'a study in ignorance.'

'Next they prepared a number of homemade instruments, including a large piece of tempered sheet metal with an "X" chiseled on it. Then they miked the Sun Columns.'

'Marshall Allen said that when they began to record the musicians asked Sun Ra what they should play, and he answered only that he would point to them when he wanted them to start. The result is an astonishing achievement, a musical event which seems independent of all other musical traditions and histories.... The piece is all texture, with no sense of tonality except where Art Jenkins sings through a metal megaphone with a tunnel voice. But to say that the instruments seem out of tune misses the point, since there is no "tune", and in any case the Arkestra did not know how to tune most of the instruments...' John F Szwed

== Reception ==
Professional ratings
Review scores
Source	Rating
AllMusic	3/5 stars

AllMusic said, "Strange Strings is a somewhat legendary album from the mid-'60s. 'Worlds Approaching' is a great tune, anchored by a bass ostinato and timpani and featuring several fantastic solos... Off and on throughout the tune, Bugs Hunter applies near-lethal doses of reverb, giving the piece a very odd but interesting sound."

== Track listing ==
=== 12" Vinyl ===
All songs by Sun Ra
Side A:

1. "Worlds Approaching"
2. "Strings Strange"

Side B:

3. "Strange Strings"

=== CD extra track ===
4. "Door Squeak"

== Musicians ==
- Sun Ra - electric piano, lightning drum, timpani, squeaky door, strings
- Marshall Allen - oboe, alto saxophone, strings
- John Gilmore - tenor saxophone, strings
- Danny Davis - flute, alto saxophone, strings
- Pat Patrick - flute, baritone saxophone, strings
- Robert Cummings - bass clarinet, strings
- Ali Hassan - trombone, strings
- Ronnie Boykins: bass viol
- Clifford Jarvis - timpani, percussion
- James Jacson - log drums, strings
- Carl Nimrod - strings
- Art Jenkins - space voice, strings

Recorded New York, 1966 except Door Squeak, 1967.

“I’m painting pictures of things I know about, and things I’ve felt, that the world just hasn’t had the chance to feel... I’m painting pictures of another plane of existence, you might say, of something that’s so far away that it seems to be nonexistent. I’m painting pictures of that, but it is a world of happiness which people have been looking for or say they wanted, but they haven’t been able to achieve it.” Sun Ra, interviewed by Henry Dumas in 1966
