= Ed Askew =

American painter and singer-songwriter (1940–2025)

Background information
- Born: Edward Crane Askew; December 1, 1940; Stamford, Connecticut, U.S.
- Died: January 4, 2025 (aged 84)
- Genre: Folk
- Occupations: Painter; musician; singer‑songwriter
- Instruments: Vocals; piano; ukulele; tiple; guitar; keyboards; harmonica
- Years active: 1966–2025
- Labels: ESP-Disk; Drag City; Sub Pop
- Website: edaskew.bandcamp.com

Edward Crane Askew (December 1, 1940 – January 4, 2025) was an American painter and singer-songwriter who first recorded in 1968 and lived in New York City.

== Life and career ==
Born in Stamford, Connecticut, on December 1, 1940, Askew moved to New Haven, Connecticut, to study painting at Yale School of Art in 1963 and took up, more or less, permanent residence there until leaving for New York City in 1987.

After graduating from art school in 1966, Askew was called up for the draft. Not feeling particularly enthusiastic about going to war at age 26, he looked for a teaching job and found work at a private prep school in Connecticut. It was while teaching he started making songs; he also acquired his Martin tiple at this time. The singer-songwriter moved to New York for a few months in 1967 where he met Bernard Stollman of ESP-Disk, who offered him a contract. Between 1968 and 1986, Ed lived, mostly, in New Haven; doing occasional shows with his band, and later doing solo shows there. Around 1987, Ed moved to New York City, where he continued to write and record songs, and occasionally perform.

Pitchfork and many other high-profile music media praised his work, labeling him as a New York legend. He collaborated with Sharon Van Etten on his 2013 album For the World.

Ed Askew died on January 4, 2025, at the age of 84. Jay Pluck, his close friend and collaborator, told People "Ed was a brave gay songwriter from the beginning and I hope more come to know this. Ed's music changed the lives of people from many generations and continues to do so".

== Albums ==
- Ask the Unicorn (1968) (LP on ESP Disk)
- These Nights and Days (1999) (LP self-released)
- Little Eyes (2005) (LP on De Stijl Records)
- Rainy Day Song (2008) (LP on Spinning Gold Records)
- Imperfiction (2011) (LP on Drag City)
- For the World (2013) (LP on Tin Angel Records, TAR037)
- Rose (2014) (double 10" with Joshua Burkett and Steve Gunn on Okraïna Records)
- Rainbow Bridge (2014) (cassette on OSR Tapes)
- Ask the Unicorn (2015) (Reissue LP on Tin Angel Records)
- Art and Life (2017) (LP/CD on Tin Angel Records)
- London (2020) (LP on Tin Angel Records)
- The Final Painting (2026) (LP on Tin Angel Records)
