= Randy Burns =

Randy Burns may refer to:

- Randy Burns (singer) (1948–2026), American folk singer, songwriter and guitarist
- Randy Burns (music producer), American punk and metal record producer
