= The Will Come, Is Now =

Live album by Ronnie Boykins
- Released: 1975
- Recorded: February 1974
- Genre: Free jazz
- Length: 46:59
- Labels: ESP-Disk; 3026

The Will Come, Is Now is an album by bassist Ronnie Boykins, his sole release as a leader. It was recorded during February 1974, and was released on LP in 1975 by ESP-Disk. On the album, Boykins is joined by multi-instrumentalists Joe Ferguson and Jimmy Vass, saxophonist Monty Waters, trombonist Daoud Haroom, and percussionists Art Lewis and George Avaloz. Saxophonist Marzette Watts was the recording engineer.

According to ESP-Disk owner Bernard Stollman, he initially met Boykins in 1964, during the October Revolution in Jazz festival in New York City. He invited the bassist to record an album, but was told that he was not yet ready. Ten years later, Boykins contacted Stollman, and a recording session was arranged. The album was the last release by ESP-Disk before it temporarily suspended operations.

The title track was included in the 2009 compilation Spiritual Jazz: Esoteric, Modal + Deep Jazz From The Underground 1968-77.

== Reception ==
Professional ratings
Review scores
Source	Rating
AllMusic	4/5 stars
All About Jazz	4.5/5 stars
All About Jazz	4/5 stars

In a review for AllMusic, Dan Warburton wrote: "Ronnie Boykins is best known for his work as bassist with Sun Ra..., but the odd meters and horn arrangements in this 1975 septet session for ESP... recall Mingus more than they do Boykins' former employer... Lively and entertaining it may be, but Heliocentric Worlds it definitely is not."

Raul d'Gama Rose of All About Jazz commented: "Boykins journeys through the Heliocentric worlds back to his Afro-centric soul at the helm of a fine ensemble with music that cuts to the heart of a spiritualism born of John Coltrane, Pharoah Sanders, and Archie Shepp... Bernard Stollman's patience and permission has paid off and a record to rival the best from John Coltrane to Albert Ayler and [Sam] Rivers makes a lasting impression in one fell swoop." AAJ's Jerry D'Souza noted that the album "marks [Boykins'] place as an adventurous bassist and a composer with a gift for style and genre."

Writing for The Sound Projector, Ed Pinsent stated that the album "has its moments of near-lugubrious wailing on side one, such as the poignant 'Starlight at the Wonder Inn', while side two livens the pace with 'Dawn is Evening, Afternoon' which reveals a strong Ornette influence in its open-ended construction, while 'The Third I' is reminiscent of Don Cherry's interests in non-Western rhythms and modes."

In an article for Point of Departure, Francesco Martinelli remarked: "this lone effort of Boykins as a leader stands out as the testimony of an original artistic personality with strong musical, esthetic and philosophical connections to a pan-African concept, where music has a communal and spiritual value. His other sessions show his importance as instrumentalist, but this is the only chance we have to appreciate his compositional and arranging style."

Bill Hart of The Vinyl Press called the album "great fun," and wrote: "The sonics... are extremely good in the sense that the instruments sound very real... stark and uncluttered and you get a real sense of the original recording space."

== Track listing ==
All compositions by Ronnie Boykins.

=== Side A ===
1. "The Will Come, Is Now" – 12:26
2. "Starlight at the Wonder Inn" – 7:28
3. "Demon's Dance" – 3:16

=== Side B ===
1. "Dawn is Evening, Afternoon" – 6:12
2. "Tipping on Heels" – 4:47
3. "The Third I" – 12:25

== Personnel ==
- Ronnie Boykins – bass, sousaphone
- Joe Ferguson – flute, soprano saxophone, tenor saxophone, shaker
- Jimmy Vass – flute, alto saxophone, soprano saxophone, bells, shaker
- Monty Waters – alto saxophone, soprano saxophone, bells, shaker
- Daoud Haroom – trombone, bells, shaker
- Art Lewis – percussion, drums, bells, shaker
- George Avaloz – conga, bells, shaker
