= Patty Waters =

American jazz vocalist and pianist (1940–2024)

Patty Waters (March 11, 1946 – June 29, 2024) was an American jazz vocalist and pianist best known for her free jazz recordings in the 1960s for the ESP-Disk label.

== Life and career ==
Waters was born in Iowa on March 11, 1946. She started singing semi-professionally in high school. After school, she sang for the Jerry Gray Hotel Jazz Band. Her family moved to Denver and she started listening to Billie Holiday, whose life and singing had a profound influence on her.

In the early 1960s she followed the recommendation of friends to move to New York. Albert Ayler heard her in a dining club and introduced her to Bernard Stollman, the owner of the experimental jazz label ESP-Disk. Her most influential albums, Sings (1965) and College Tour (1966) were made for this label.

Her best known recording is a nearly fourteen minute version of the traditional song "Black Is the Colour (Of My True Love's Hair)" (from Sings), which is rendered in a haunting, anguished wail.

In the late 1960s, she spent time in Europe and then left the music world to raise her son (born in 1969) in California. Almost 30 years later she recorded the album Love Songs in 1996 and began performing in public again. This included reunion concerts with pianist Burton Greene at two music festivals in May 2003: Visions Festival in New York and Le Weekend in Stirling.

In 2004 she released You Thrill Me: A Musical Odyssey, a collection of rare and unissued recordings from the years 1962–1979. ESP-Disk reissued Sings and College Tour on a single CD (The Complete ESP-Disk Recordings) in 2006.

Waters returned in 2019 with the album Live (Blank Forms) recorded at the First Unitarian Congregational Church in Brooklyn. The album was followed in 2020 by another live recording entitled An Evening In Houston (Clean Feed).

On June 5, 2020 she released an unissued 1970 LP titled Plays via her own label.

Waters died on June 29, 2024, at the age of 78.

== Discography ==
- Sings (ESP-Disk, 1965)
- College Tour (ESP-Disk, 1966)
- Love Songs (Jazz Focus, 1996)
- You Thrill Me: A Musical Odyssey 1962–1979 (Water, 2004)
- Happiness Is a Thing Called Joe: Live in San Francisco 2002 (DBK Works, 2005)
- The Complete ESP-Disk Recordings (ESP-Disk, 2006)
- 6.12.17 (Otoroku, 2018)
- Live (Blank Forms Editions, 2019)
- An Evening In Houston (Clean Feed, 2020)
- Plays (Waters Sings, 2020)
