= Allen Lowe =

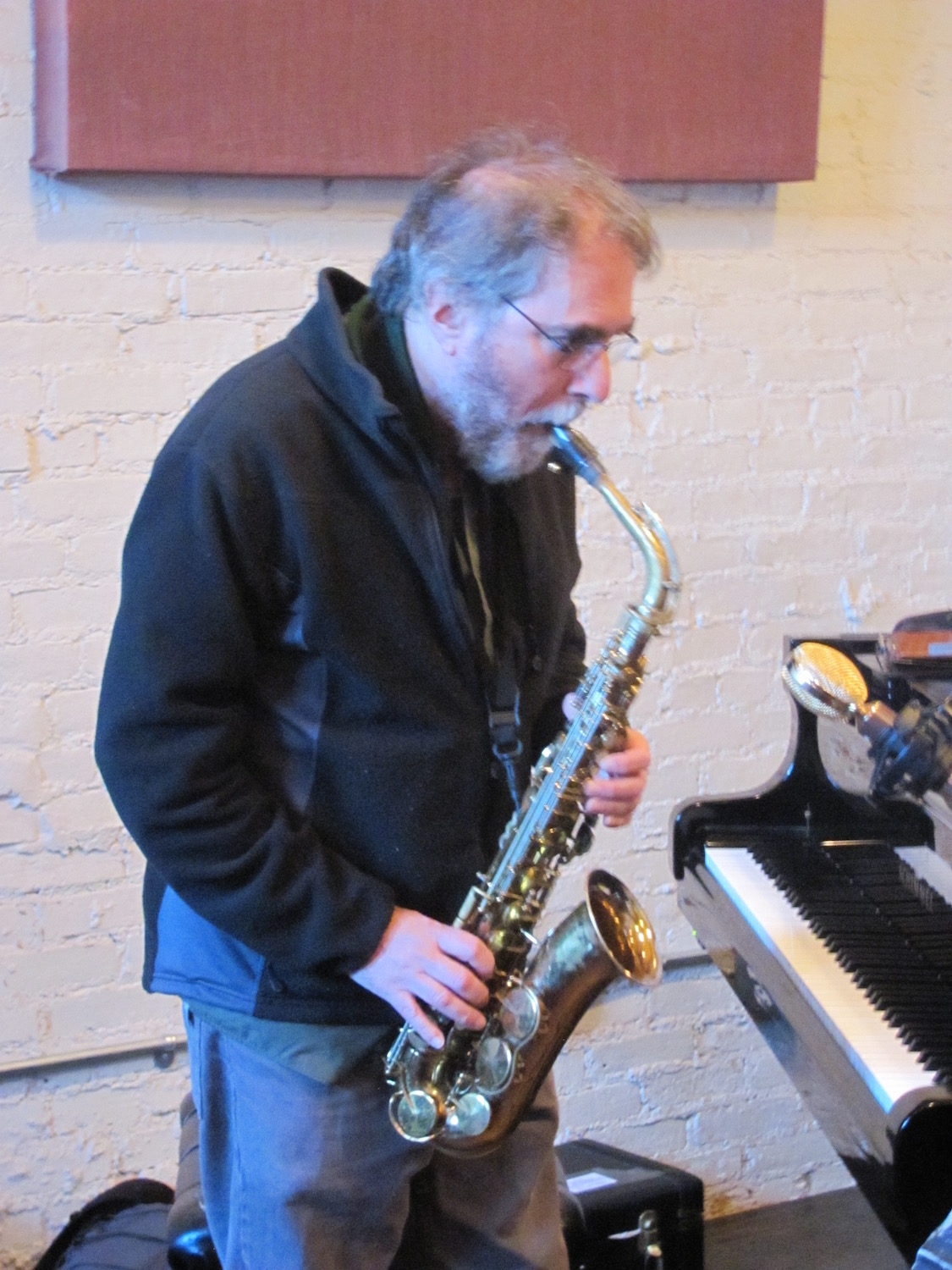

Background information
- Born: April 5, 1954 (age 72); Massapequa Park, New York, U.S.
- Genre: Jazz
- Occupation: Musician
- Instrument: Saxophone
- Years active: 1964–present
- Label: Constant Sorrow
- Website: allenlowe.com

Allen Lowe is an American composer, musician, music historian, and sound restoration specialist. He plays alto saxophone, C melody saxophone, and guitar and has recorded with Julius Hemphill, Marc Ribot, Roswell Rudd, Don Byron, Doc Cheatham, and David Murray. He has also produced a series of historical projects on American popular song, jazz, and the blues.

== Early life and education ==
Lowe grew up in Massapequa Park, New York in the late 1950s and early 1960s. He started playing saxophone in jazz groups at age 15. He had some of his first jazz experiences, as a teenager, at the legendary Lower East Side "Slugs Saloon," seeing Ornette Coleman's band and Charles Mingus, among others. When his young band (with guitarist Joel Perry) was booked for a festival in Bedford Stuyvesant circa 1968, they turned out to be one of the opening acts for the comeback appearance of Eubie Blake.

Lowe dropped out of the Yale School of Drama after one year of studying to be a playwright. He met and married his wife, and they moved to Brooklyn where Lowe completed a master's degree in Library Sciences (1982) from St. John's University.

== Career ==
After graduation, Lowe and his wife moved to New Haven, where he returned to his saxophone and became active in the local jazz scene with bassist Jeff Fuller and drummer Ray Kaczynski. Lowe became more interested in avant-garde music and began composing, performing, and recording. He recorded his first album, For Poor B. B., in 1985 and then recorded a series of albums with Julius Hemphill, Don Byron, David Murray, Doc Cheatham, Roswell Rudd, Loren Schoenberg, Jimmy Knepper, and Randy Sandke. He recorded Mental Strain at Dawn live at the Knitting Factory with his Jack Purvis Memorial Orchestra and recorded sessions for Enja Records and Music & Arts. In 1990 Lowe began working for the mayor of New Haven and became director of Jazz New Haven, an annual, free festival. He ran the festival for three years, hiring musicians such as Tony Williams, Max Roach, Jaki Byard, Tito Puente, Freddie Hubbard, Joe Lovano, Randy Brecker, Ray Barretto, and James Moody.

In 1996 Lowe moved to South Portland, Maine. He began composing again and taught himself audio restoration. He wrote American Pop from Minstrel to Mojo (a survey of American music from 1896 to 1946) That Devilin' Tune: A Jazz History 1900-1950 God Didn't Like It: Electric Hillbillies, Singing Preachers, and the Beginning of Rock and Roll, 1950-1970; and Really the Blues? A Blues History, 1893–1959. The books were accompanied by CD sets that were mastered by Lowe. He began doing freelance audio work for Rhino Records, Shout Records, Rykodisc, Sony, and Venus Records and for Michael Feinstein and Terry Gross.

Lowe lectured on musical topics and moderated panels at the Rutgers Institute of Jazz Studies and the annual EMP Pop Conference in Seattle, Washington. He lectured for the United States Information Agency in Europe on American music history. His book Devilin' Tune was used in courses at Harvard and Yale, and entries appeared about him in the New Grove Dictionary of Jazz and The Penguin Guide to Jazz on Compact Disc. There is a chapter about him in the book Bebop and Nothingness by Francis Davis.

Around 2001, Lowe began playing and recording on guitar and alto saxophone. In 2007 he recorded Jews in Hell: Radical Jewish Acculturation with Matthew Shipp, Lewis Porter, Randy Sandke, Marc Ribot, Scott Robinson, and Erin Mckeown. Jews in Hell led to Lowe's inclusion in the book Jazz Jews.

Lowe was voted 2021 Jazz Times Readers' Poll Artist of the Year.

== Discography ==
Album	Released	Label	Sidemen
Louis Armstrong's America (Volumes 1 & 2)	2024	ESP-Disk	Marc Ribot, Andy Stein, Ursula Oppens, Lewis Porter, Loren Schoenberg, Aaron Johnson, Ray Anderson, and numerous others
Disconnected Works, 1980-2018 / An Avant Garde of Our Own: Radical Jewish Acculturation In the Diaspora of the Diaspora	2018 (?)	ESP-Disk / Constant Sorrow	Julius Hemphill, Doc Cheatham, John Rapson, Ray Kaczynski, Robert Rumbolz, Paul Austerlitz, Lisa Parrott, Kalaparusha, and numerous others
Ballad for Albert (In the Diaspora of the Diaspora)	2015	Constant Sorrow	With Matthew Shipp, Kevin Ray, Jake Millett
We Will Gather When We Gather (In the Diaspora of the Diaspora)	2015	Constant Sorrow	With Hamiet Bluiett, Lou Grassi, Matt Lavelle, Kevin Ray, Jake Millett, Ras Moshe Burnett, Ava Mendoza
Man with Guitar: Where's Robert Johnson? (In the Diaspora of the Diaspora)	2015	Constant Sorrow	With Gary Bartz, DJ Logic, Brian Simontacchi, Christopher Meeder, Jake Millett, Lewis Porter, Jeff Fuller
Where a Cigarette is Smoked by Ten Men (In the Diaspora of the Diaspora)	2015	Constant Sorrow	With Zoe Christiansen, Kris Day, Miki Matsuki
I Alone: The Everlasting Beauty of Monotony (Matthew Shipp Plays the Music of Allen Lowe)	2015	Constant Sorrow	With Michael Gregory Jackson, Eliot Cardinaux, Chris Klaxton, Kevin Ray, Peter McLaughlin, Ryan Blotnick
Mulatto Radio: Field 1-4, or: A Jew at Large in the Minstrel Diaspora	2014	Constant Sorrow	With Matthew Shipp, Kalaparusha, Ken Peplowski, Randy Sandke, Noah Preminger, Ras Moshe, Ursula Oppens, Lou Grassi, Rob Wallace, Ray Suhy, Kevin Ray, Rick Moody, Lewis Porter, Jon-Erik Kellso, Gerhard Graml
Blues and the Empirical Truth (or: Every Other Day I Have The Blues)	2011	Music & Arts	With Roswell Rudd, Matthew Shipp.
Jews in Hell: Radical Jewish Acculturation	2007	Spaceout	With Matthew Shipp, Erin McKeown, Lewis Porter, Marc Ribot, Randy Sandke
Woyzeck's Death	1995	Enja	With Roswell Rudd, Randy Sandke
Dark Was the Night, Cold Was the Ground: The American Song Project	1994	Music & Arts	With Roswell Rudd
Mental Strain at Dawn: A Modern Portrait of Louis Armstrong	1992	Stash	With David Murray, Doc Cheatham, Loren Schoenberg
New Tango '92	1992	Fairhaven	With Julius Hemphill, Doc Cheatham
At the Moment of Impact	1991	Fairhaven	With Julius Hemphill, Don Byron, Jeff Fuller, Ray Kaczynski
For Poor B.B.	1988	Fairhaven	With Bob Neloms

== Publications ==
- Really The Blues? A Blues History, 1893-1959 - published by Constant Sorrow Press, 2013. 36-CD set concurrently published by West Hill Radio Archive, 2010.
- That Devilin’ Tune: A Jazz History, 1900-1950 - published by Music and Arts Publications of America, 2001. 36-CD set issued concurrently, spring 2006 by West Hill Radio Archive (Canada) and West Hill Radio Archive (Germany).
- American Pop From Minstrel to Mojo: On Record, 1890-1956 - published by Cadence Jazz Books, 1997. 9-CD set issued concurrently by West Hill Radio Archive (Canada) and West Hill Radio Archive (Germany). Lowe curated, restored, mastered, and wrote liner notes for the tracks.
- The Lost Generation: Jazz of the 1950s - unpublished manuscript; work in progress, book and 9-CD set study of jazz of the 1950s.
- God Didn't Like It: Electric Hillbillies, Singing Priests, and the Origins of Rock and Roll, 1950-1970 - published by Constant Sorrow Press, 2013.
- Rhapsodies in Black: Music of the Harlem Renaissance - 4-CD set on the music of the Harlem renaissance. Issued by Rhino Records. Set was nominated for 2002 Grammy Award (Gerald Early) for Liner Notes.
