= Randy Burns (singer) =

American folk singer, songwriter and guitarist (1948–2026)

Randall R. Burns (April 14, 1948 – August 8, 2026) was an American folk singer, songwriter and guitarist who recorded several albums in the 1960s and early 1970s, when he performed with the Sky Dog Band. He continued to perform and record occasionally.

== Life and career ==
Burns was born and grew up in New Haven, Connecticut, and began performing in coffee houses in the city aged 17. In 1966, he moved to Greenwich Village, New York City, where he busked before being recruited as the regular opening act at The Gaslight Cafe on Macdougal Street. He also performed at clubs such as Gerdes Folk City and The Bitter End, opening for such musicians as Tom Paxton, Phil Ochs, Carolyn Hester and Dave Van Ronk. He was invited to record for ESP-Disk Records by label owner Bernard Stollman, and released his first album, Of Love and War, in 1967. The album included versions of songs by Eric Andersen and David Blue as well as Burns's own compositions.

After returning to New Haven, Burns started a band, The Morning, who performed locally but then split up. Back in New York, Burns then formed a psychedelic band, the Sky Dog Band, comprising Burns (vocals, guitar), Mat Kastner (keyboards), Bruce Samuels (bass, flute), and John O'Leary (percussion). With engineer Herb Abramson they recorded Burns's second album, Evening of the Magician, released in 1968. Burns wrote all the songs and the album is described at Allmusic as " a minor classic of acid folk". For his third and final ESP-Disk album, Song for an Uncertain Lady (1970), Burns retained the Sky Dog Band, but the music showed an increased country music influence. Although Burns and the Sky Dog Band performed regularly around Greenwich Village, and toured nationally, none of his records were commercially successful.

He then signed for Mercury Records, releasing the album Randy Burns and the Sky Dog Band in 1971. He then joined the Polydor label, releasing I'm a Lover, Not a Fool (1972) and Still On Our Feet (1973), again with little success, and was dropped by the label. He performed in festivals and coffee houses with Mat Kastner, who also played guitar and bass. In the late 1970s, Burns relocated to Dublin, Ireland, for two years, continuing to perform in bars. After returning to the US, he released the cassette-only album The Cat's Pajamas in 1991 on his own Picket Fence label. He also worked as a security guard, and as a private detective, and wrote an autobiography, Before the Road Ended, excerpts from which were published in magazines and on websites in the 1990s. After a divorce, he moved from New Haven to California, until moving back to New York around 2004. He began performing again in 2009, and released an album, The Simple Things, followed in 2010 by Hobos and Kings.

Burns's ESP-Disk recordings were reissued on the German ZYX label in the 1990s.

Burns died in Melbourne, Florida, on August 8, 2026, at the age of 78.
