= Turn On, Tune In, Drop Out (album) =

Studio album by Dr. Timothy Leary
- Released: 1967
- Genres: Psychedelic rock, spoken word
- Length: 33:47
- Labels: Mercury 21131 (mono)/61131 (stereo); Performance PERF 389

Professional ratings
Review scores
Source	Rating
Allmusic	3/5 stars

Turn On, Tune In, Drop Out is a 1967 album credited to Timothy Leary, created to accompany the documentary film of the same name. It contains narrated meditation mixed with freeform psychedelic rock music.

== Music ==
According to BrooklynVegan: "Like the earlier release, it is spoken word but with sparse haunting mostly guitar and tabla music over it. Unlike the direct plainspoken narration of the earlier record, this sounds as if the voices are beamed down from somewhere in the stratosphere." Lyrical themes explored on the album include psychedelic drug use and social issues. According to Alex Henderson of AllMusic: "On this disc, one hears Leary expressing his belief that most of society's problems are caused by people over 40 (although Leary himself was about 46 or 47 at the time) and complaining that the American school system breeds mindless conformity, but mostly, he talks about drugs -- especially LSD, which Leary believed could dramatically change society for the better."

== Reception and legacy ==
Alex Henderson AllMusic gave the album three stars out of five, writing: "One doesn't have to agree with Leary's theories to realize that Turn On, Tune In, Drop Out has historic value. This recording is very much a product of its time, and it is an intriguing listen despite -- or perhaps because of -- Leary's eccentricities and excesses."

A staff writer at BrooklynVegan wrote in 2017: "Calling this a singular work does not do it justice. While strange, its obvious influence on the culture at the time cannot be overstated. So pull up a chair, turn on, tune in and give this a whirl if you dare."

== Track listing ==
Side A

1. "The Turn On" - 2:23
2. "The Tune In" - 3:34
3. "The Beginning of the Voyage (Heart Chakra)" - 4:01
4. "Root Chakra" - 2:05
5. "All Girls Are Yours" - 4:37
6. "Freak-Out" - 0:29

Side B

1. "Freak-Out (Continued)" - 3:53
2. "Genetic Memory" - 6:43
3. "Re-Entry (Nirvana)" - 3:10
4. "Epilogue (Turn On, Tune In, Drop Out)" - 2:52

== Liner notes ==
All selections written by Maryvonne Giercarz/Lars Eric/Richard Bond

Guide: Timothy Leary, Ph.D.
Voyager: Ralph Metzner, Ph.D.
Divine Connection: Rosemary Woodruff
Veena: Maryvonne Giercarz
Guitar: Lars Eric
Tabla: Richard Bond

Executive Producer: Henry G. Saperstein
Associate Producer: S. Richard Krown

Special Effects Conception: UPA Pictures, Inc.
Produced by Al Ham
Tape Editor: Dale McKechnie

== Notes ==
Sample from this album were used on the Skinny Puppy song "Left Hand Shake" from their album Last Rights. Leary agreed for the sample to be used but the copyright holder did not and the song was pulled from the album. Samples were also used on the Nine Inch Nails remix album Fixed.

There were two albums with this name: the 1967 'Original Motion Picture Soundtrack' - Mercury Records 21131 (mono)/61131 (stereo) - and a prior, 1966 version without music and a different narrative by Leary, possibly recorded at the Millbrook mansion - (ESP-Disk 1027). On it Leary describes the recording location of his narrative as 'On the third floor of the Castilla Foundation' in New York, a countryside house used as a sanctuary for psychedelic experiences.
