= Buck Curran =

American singer-songwriter

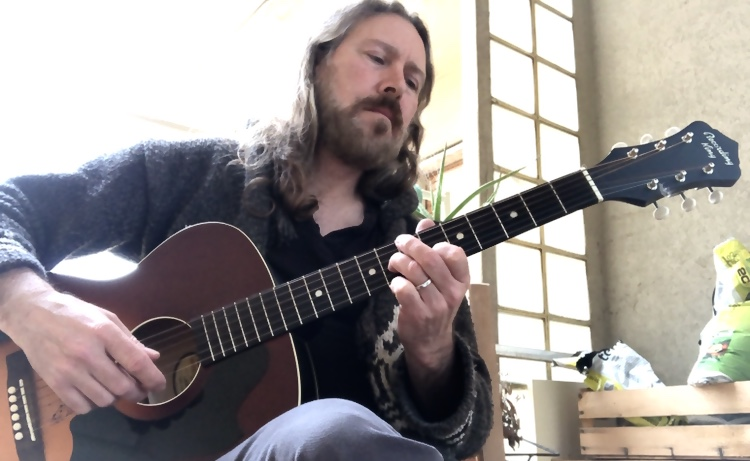
- Buck Curran in Bergamo, Italy 2020

Background information
- Born: May 23, 1967 (age 59); Cocoa Beach, Florida, U.S.
- Genres: Indie folk, Psychedelic folk
- Occupations: Songwriter, Musician, Producer, Guitar Maker, Painter, Writer
- Instruments: Vocals, guitar, harmonium, banjo, flute
- Labels: Stange Attractors Audio House; ESP-Disk; Fire Museum Records; Obsolete Recordings; Important Records; alt-vinyl; Tompkins Square

Buck Curran (born May 23, 1967) is an American singer-songwriter-guitarist, record producer, painter and guitar maker.

== Biography ==
Curran formed the psych-folk duo Arborea in 2005 with partner Shanti Deschaine, with whom he recorded five albums and toured extensively throughout the United States and Europe between 2006 and 2015. Curran's music is associated with the Psychedelic Folk and Indie Folk genres, though his musical origins stem from performing traditional and original Blues and Folk in the 1990s. In 2009 he produced the benefit compilation Leaves of Life (2009), which included notable artists Devendra Benhart, Marissa Nadler, Alela Diane, etc. Curran also contributed to the renewal of interest in Robbie Basho producing two tribute albums, We Are All One in the Sun (2010) and Basket Full of Dragons (2016). In the Winter of 2011/2012 The Fretboard Journal published a feature article on Robbie Basho (Voice of the Eagle) written by Curran for Issue 24. In 2019 he curated and produced a tribute to Jack Rose Ten Years Gone. The album was released on the December 5th, 2019 on the 10 year anniversary of Jack's passing.

In July 2016 he released his first solo record, Immortal Light, a split release between ESP-Disk and Obsolete Recordings. In 2018 Curran released his second album Morning Haikus, Afternoon Ragas. His third album 'No Love Is Sorrow' was released during lockdown in Bergamo, Italy which became the initial epicenter of the COVID-19 pandemic in Europe in the late winter and early spring of 2020. Curran was interviewed by Pitchfork in March 2020 at the beginning of the lockdown. On May 1 of 2020 he performed a 'Tiny Desk Home Concert' for NPR.

Curran is also an artist and painted the cover for Basket Full of Dragons. In July 2014 his paintings were part of a special exhibition in Denmark at the Fano Free Folk Festival, during which he also presented a special discussion on his spontaneous brushstroke technique using watercolors and improvisation in art. In 2017 his paintings were exhibited in Bergamo, Italy in December 2017 at InArteWerkkunst Gallery during the NOWART Exhibition. As well, he is a notable guitar maker who worked from 2002 to 2009 for renowned Maine luthier Dana Bourgeois, where he developed his own guitar model called Butterfly. His prototype for the Butterfly was included (alongside other notable luthiers from Maine: Dana Bourgeois, John Slobod, etc.) in the 'Player's Art': Guitar Exhibition at the Colby College Museum of Art May 7 thru July 17, 2005. Acoustic Guitar Magazine featured one of Curran's Butterfly guitars (made in 2006) for their 'Great Acoustics' article in their March 2012 issue. In 2017 Acoustic Guitar Magazine featured Curran's acoustic guitar instrumental 'River Unto Sea' in their June issue, followed by Curran's acoustic guitar instrumental 'Song for Liam' in their March/April 2019 issue. In the January/February 2022 issue of Acoustic Guitar featured Buck Curran's 'Long Lost 2009 Sobell Model 1' for their 'Great Acoustics' page. Guitar Magazine/String Letter Media also included Buck Curran's 'Song for Liam' in their new publication DADGAD Guitar Essentials(2022). In 2022 the Bert Jansch Foundation asked Buck to participate in 'For Bert Jansch: Around the World in 80 Plays', a special project featuring performance videos of select musicians playing special 'Bert Jansch' Yamaha guitars that were sent around the world. Curran's video was filmed in historic Città Alta in Bergamo, Italy. Videos and artist pages have been published at Bert Jansch Foundation dot org.

Curran's acoustic and electric guitar playing is characterized by the extensive use of low alternate tunings, slide, Ebow, reverb, manipulating string overtones and dynamics creating haunting voice-like timbres on the instrument.

== Discography ==
=== Albums ===
- Immortal Light (2016, ESP-Disk/Obsolete Recordings)
- Morning Haikus, Afternoon Ragas (2018, ESP-Disk/Obsolete Recordings)
- No Love Is Sorrow (2020, ESP-Disk/Obsolete Recordings)
- Delights and Dangers of Ambiguity (Improvisations 2017-2022) (2023, Obsolete Recordings)
- The Long Distance (2023, Obsolete Recordings/2024, CD & Tape Eiderdown Records)
- One Evening and Other Folk Songs (2024, Obsolete Recordings/ESP-Disk)
- Far Driven Sun (2025, Obsolete Recordings/Echodelick Records/ESP-Disk)
- Illuminations (2026, Obsolete Recordings/Island House Recordings)

=== EPs ===
- Standing Rock (2017, Obsolete Recordings)
- The Rushings feat. Buck Curran Nashville West Session (2016, Obsolete Recordings)
- Adele H feat. Buck Curran, Dogmas EP (2017, Obsolete Recordings)
- WFMU The Frow Show Live Session (Feat. Jodi Pedrali) (2021, Obsolete Recordings)

=== Various Artist Compilations and other albums produced and curated by Buck Curran ===
- Leaves of Life (2009, Darla Records)
- We Are All One, In The Sun: A Tribute to Robbie Basho (2010, Important Records/ 2011 alt.vinyl)
- Basket Full Of Dragons: A Tribute to Robbie Basho Vol 2 (2016, Obsolete Recordings)
- Robbie Basho: Live in Forli, Italy 1982 (2017, ESP-Disk/Obsolete Recordings)
- Ten Years Gone: A Tribute to Jack Rose (2019, Tompkins Square)
- Ten Years Gone: A Tribute to Jack Rose (2022, Obsolete Recordings - Digital Reissue w/extra tracks)
- Winter Solstice: A Tribute to Steffen Basho-Junghans (2023, Obsolete Recordings)

=== Records with Arborea ===
- Wayfaring Summer (Summer Street, 2006)
- Arborea (Fire Museum, 2008)
- House of Sticks (Borne!/Darla, 2009)
- Red Planet (Strange Attractors Audio House, 2011)
- Fortress of the Sun (ESP-Disk, 2013)
