= Roger Blank =

American jazz drummer (born 1938)

Roger Blank (born December 19, 1938, New York City) is an American jazz drummer.

Blank's grandfather played saxophone and his father William Blank was a trumpeter who had performed with Cootie Williams. Blank worked with Hank Mobley in Harlem for several years and studied under Charlie Persip. He worked with Sun Ra starting in 1964 and recorded several times with him. He worked extensively on the New York jazz scene in the 1960s and 1970s; he played with and was influenced by Ornette Coleman, and helped found a group called the Melodic Art-Tet in 1971 which was devoted to playing in Coleman's harmolodic style. This group also included Charles Brackeen, Ahmed Abdullah, William Parker, and Ronnie Boykins. Other associations included work with Bill Barron, Don Cherry, John Coltrane, Dennis Charles, Walt Dickerson, Kenny Dorham, Frank Foster, Charles Greenlee, John Hicks, Ken McIntyre, Pharoah Sanders, Archie Shepp, and Charles Tolliver. Blank appeared on the piece "Hambone" with Shepp on the 1965 live album The New Wave in Jazz. He relocated to Atlanta in the 1980s and led an ensemble there, but moved back to New York in the 1990s, where he lived in the Williamsburg neighborhood.

His daughter Radha Blank is a filmmaker, writer, and actress, known for the Sundance-winning film The 40-Year-Old Version.

== Discography ==
=== As sideman ===
With Albert Ayler

- Holy Ghost: Rare & Unissued Recordings (1962–70) (Revenant, 2004) one track

With Earl Cross

- Jazz of the Seventies: Sam Rivers Tuba Trio & Earl Cross Sextet (Circle, 1977)

With Walt Dickerson

- Impressions of a Patch of Blue (MGM, 1966)

With Frank Foster

- Shiny Stockings (Denon, 1977)

With Andrew Hill

- Nefertiti (East Wind, 1976)

With Leroy Jenkins and the Jazz Composer's Orchestra

- For Players Only (JCOA, 1975)

With Clifford Jordan

- The Complete Clifford Jordan Strata-East Sessions (Mosaic, 2017)

With Jimmy Lyons

- Push Pull (Hathut, 1979)

With The Melodic Art-Tet (with Charles Brackeen, Ahmed Abdullah, William Parker, and Ramadan Mumeen)

- Melodic Art–Tet (NoBusiness, 2013)

With Sam Rivers

- Crystals (Impulse!, 1974)

With Pharoah Sanders

- Tauhid (Impulse!, 1967)
- Priceless Jazz Collection (compilation) (GRP, 1997)
- Anthology: You’ve Got to Have Freedom (compilation) (Soul Brother, 2005)
- The Impulse Story (compilation) (Impulse!, 2006)

With Archie Shepp

- The New Wave in Jazz (Impulse!, 1965) one track

With Sun Ra

- Other Planes of There (Saturn, 1966)
- The Magic City (Saturn, 1966)
- The Heliocentric Worlds of Sun Ra, Volume Two (Saturn, 1966)
- Nothing Is (ESP-Disk, 1970)
- Heliocentric Worlds Vol. 3 (The Lost Tapes) (ESP-Disk, 2005)
- The Heliocentric Worlds of Sun Ra, Vols. 1-3 (compilation) (ESP-Disk, 2010)
- Heliocentric Worlds 1 & 2 Revisited (compilation) (Ezz-thetics, 2020)
