= The Heliocentric Worlds of Sun Ra, Volume One =

Studio album by Sun Ra
- Released: 1965
- Recorded: April 20, 1965, RLA, New York City
- Genre: Avant-garde jazz
- Length: 35:07
- Label: ESP-Disk; Fontana

Sun Ra chronology
Other Planes of There (1964)	The Heliocentric Worlds of Sun Ra, Volume One (1965)	The Magic City (1965)

Alternative cover
- ESP second and subsequent pressings, 1966

Professional ratings
Review scores
Source	Rating
All About Jazz	5/5 stars
AllMusic	4.5/5 stars
DownBeat	2.5/5 stars
The Encyclopedia of Popular Music	5/5 stars
The Penguin Guide to Jazz Recordings	3/4 stars
The Rolling Stone Jazz Record Guide	5/5 stars

The Heliocentric Worlds of Sun Ra, Volume One is a 1965 album by the jazz musician Sun Ra. The back cover describes it as an "album of compositions and arrangements by Sun Ra played by Sun Ra and his Solar Arkestra".

The album is an example of the radical break which Sun Ra's music of that time had made with "previous notions of melody or harmony". Although heavily percussive, the music also dispenses with a continuous beat; instead Ra's music is reconstructed around "interweaving compositional and improvisatory creative principles with programmatic affects".

The album was originally released as The Heliocentric Worlds of Sun Ra, with a B/W sleeve designed by Ra himself. This was replaced with a new orange and red sleeve by Howard Bernstein & Baby Jerry - showing Sun Ra with the third eye - and the appendage Vol. 1 added when The Heliocentric Worlds of Sun Ra, Volume Two was released in 1966.

The album was re-released on CD by ZYX-Music (ESP 1014-2) in the 1990s.

Gene Tyranny describes the album in his review as

The astonishing sessions that went light years beyond "free jazz" improvisation to create a music of deeply felt explosive and gentle gesture made from sound itself without reference to previous notions of melody or harmony.

== Recording the album ==
Marshall Allen described the recording of the album in John F Szwed's biography of Sun Ra, Space Is the Place;

"Sun Ra would go to the studio and he would play something, the bass would come in, and if he didn't like it he'd stop it; and he'd give the drummer a particular rhythm, tell the bass he wanted not a 'boom boom boom,' but something else, and then he'd begin to try out the horns, we're all standing there wondering what's next...

"I just picked up the piccolo and worked with what was going on, what mood they set, or what feeling they had. A lot of things we'd be rehearsing and we did the wrong things and Sun Ra stopped the arrangement and changed it. Or he would change the person who was playing the particular solo, so that changes the arrangement. So the one that was soloing would get another part given to him personally. 'Cos he knew people. He could understand what you could do better so he would fit that with what he would tell you." Marshall Allen

== Track listing ==
All compositions by Sun Ra

=== 12" Vinyl ===
Side A:

1. "Heliocentric" – 4:00
2. "Outer Nothingness" – 7:40
3. "Other Worlds" – 4:18

Side B:

4. "The Cosmos" – 7:20
5. "Of Heavenly Things" – 5:40
6. "Nebulae" – 3:16
7. "Dancing in the Sun" – 1:50

Recorded at Studio RLA, New York, April 20, 1965. Engineered by Richard L Alderson.

== Musicians ==
- Sun Ra - Piano, Bass marimba, Electric Celeste, Timpani
- Chris Capers - Trumpet
- Teddy Nance - Trombone
- Bernard Pettaway - Bass Trombone
- Marshall Allen - Piccolo, Alto sax, Bells, Spiral Cymbal
- Danny Davis - Flute, Alto Sax
- Robert Cummings - Bass Clarinet, Woodblocks
- John Gilmore - Tenor Sax, Timpani
- Pat Patrick - Baritone Sax, Timpani
- Ronnie Boykins - Bass
- Jimhmi Johnson - Drums, Percussion, Timpani

Adapted from the ESP Sleeve notes.

== See also ==
- Sun Ra discography
