= The Magic City (Sun Ra album) =

Studio album by Sun Ra
- Released: 1966
- Recorded: 1965
- Studio: New York City
- Genre: Avant-garde jazz
- Length: 45:16
- Labels: Saturn, Impulse!, Evidence
- Producers: Alton Abraham, Infinity Inc. Jerry Gordon (1993 reissue)

Sun Ra chronology
| The Heliocentric Worlds of Sun Ra, Volume One (1965) | The Magic City (1966) | The Heliocentric Worlds of Sun Ra, Volume Two (1966) |

The Magic City is an album by the American jazz musician Sun Ra and his Solar Arkestra. Recorded in two sessions in 1965, the record was released on Ra's own Saturn label in 1966. The record was reissued by Impulse! in 1973, and on compact disc by Evidence in 1993.

== Birmingham, Alabama ==
The title Magic City refers to Ra's home town of Birmingham, Alabama, and to a large metal sign with the words 'Birmingham, The Magic City' erected in front of the railway station, Birmingham Terminal Station, in 1926 (see .) The cover art, by William White (as noted on the back side), directly references the dome of the station. Ra grew up next to the post office and close to the main station, where, "as a child, Sonny could look out the window and see the big sign over the railroad tracks that greeted visitors to The Magic City". John F. Szwed explains:

[Birmingham was] the earthly birthplace he steadfastly denied, and in the recording he reimagines the city without its grim, racist, smoke-choked past. By simply pointing to musicians when he wanted them to play, he proved it possible to collectively improvise an entire album on the strength of nothing more than a shared belief.

== Critical reception ==
Professional ratings
Review scores
| Source | Rating |
|---|---|
| AllMusic | 4/5 stars |
| DownBeat | 5/5 stars |
| The Encyclopedia of Popular Music | 4/5 stars |
| The Penguin Guide to Jazz Recordings | 4/4 stars |
| The Spin Alternative Record Guide | 10/10 |

The Penguin Guide to Jazz Recordings includes the album in its suggested “Core Collection” of essential recordings.

It is notable especially for the title track, on which "the Arkestra's range of feelings and sound is expressed in a design that's simply unprecedented in jazz." While it begins with use of tape echo recalling the experiments on Art Forms of Dimensions Tomorrow, the key features quickly emerge: Ra's simultaneous piano and clavioline intertwining with Boykins's bass as the underpinning for new long-forms of group music-making which draw on varying sub-ensembles from the Arkestra through the course of the piece. Lindsay Planer writes:

The boundaries of Sun Ra's self-proclaimed "space jazz" underwent a transformation in the mid-'60s. The Magic City is an aural snapshot of that metamorphic process. Many enthusiasts and scholars consider this to be among Ra's most definitive studio recordings.

The Spin Alternative Record Guide wrote that the album title's significance "further muddies [Sun Ra's] myth and throws his most far-reaching and cohesive endeavor into poignant relief."

== Track listing ==
=== 12" vinyl ===
All songs written by Sun Ra.
Side A:

1. "The Magic City" – (27:22)

Side B:

1. "The Shadow World" – (10:55)
2. "Abstract Eye" – (2:51)
3. "Abstract 'I'" – (4:08)

"The Shadow World", "Abstract Eye" and "Abstract 'I'" were recorded live at Olatunji's loft, New York, Spring 1965. "The Magic City" was recorded during rehearsals around September 24, 1965.

== Personnel ==
- Sun Ra – piano; clavioline (side 1); bass marimba, tympani, electronic celeste, sun harp, dragon drum (side 2)
- Pat Patrick – baritone saxophone, flute; tympani on "Abstract Eye"
- John Gilmore – tenor saxophone
- Marshall Allen – alto saxophone, flute, oboe, piccolo
- Danny Davis – alto saxophone, flute
- Harry Spencer – alto saxophone (side 1)
- Robert Cummings – bass clarinet
- Walter Miller – trumpet (side 1)
- Chris Capers – trumpet (side 2)
- Ali Hassan – trombone (side 1)
- Teddy Nance – trombone (side 2)
- Bernard Pettaway – trombone (side 2)
- Ronnie Boykins – bass
- Roger Blank – percussion (side 1)
- Jimhmi Johnson – percussion (side 2)
