= The Heliocentric Worlds of Sun Ra, Volume Two =

Studio album by Sun Ra and his Solar Arkestra
- Released: 1966
- Recorded: November 16, 1965
- Genre: Free jazz
- Length: 36:45
- Label: ESP-Disk

Sun Ra and his Solar Arkestra chronology
| The Magic City (1965) | The Heliocentric Worlds of Sun Ra, Volume Two (1966) | Nothing Is (1966) |

Professional ratings
Review scores
| Source | Rating |
|---|---|
| AllMusic | 3/5 stars |
| The Penguin Guide to Jazz Recordings | 3/4 stars |
| The Rolling Stone Jazz Record Guide | 4/5 stars |

The Heliocentric Worlds of Sun Ra, Volume Two is a 1965 recording by the jazz musician Sun Ra and his Solar Arkestra. Where Volume One of the Heliocentric Worlds series had predominantly featured short abstract pieces, Volume Two features longer pieces performed by a smaller group, making it closer in spirit to the contemporaneous The Magic City, released on Ra's own Saturn label. The record has been widely bootlegged, some versions of which were retitled The Sun Myth.

The album was re-released on CD by ZYX-Music (ESP 1017–2) in the 1990s.

== The songs ==
"The Sun Myth" is constructed around the intertwining of Ronnie Boykins's bowed bass and Ra's electronic keyboard. These predominantly low sounds contrast sharply with the interlude commentaries from the other Arkestra members. A rare alternative version – also on ESP, and with the same catalogue number – overlays African singing at the beginning and end of the piece.

"A House of Beauty" is a feature for piccolo, keyboards and bowed bass, which transforms into a piano and plucked bass duet.

"Cosmic Chaos" is an example of the apparently free but actually conducted blowing for which the Arkestra would become known over the following decades.

== The sleeve design ==
The sleeve, designed by Paul Frick, features a German astronomical chart of the Solar System. Beneath it, Frick has placed Sun Ra within a pantheon of astronomers and scientists including Tycho Brahe, Leonardo da Vinci, Copernicus, Galileo and Pythagoras. The back cover features a poem titled "There" which was recited in the song "Starship" by MC5 from their debut album Kick Out the Jams (which credits Sun Ra as a songwriter).

== Track listing ==
=== 12" vinyl ===
All songs by Sun Ra
Side A:

1. "The Sun Myth" - (17:20)

Side B:

1. "A House of Beauty" - (5:10)
2. "Cosmic Chaos" - (14:15)

Recorded November 16, 1965, at Studio RLA, New York.

== Personnel ==
- Sun Ra - piano, tuned bongos and clavioline
- Marshall Allen - alto saxophone, piccolo, flute
- Pat Patrick - baritone saxophone
- Walter Miller - trumpet
- John Gilmore - tenor saxophone
- Robert Cummings - bass clarinet
- Ronnie Boykins - bass
- Roger Blank - percussion
- Richard L. Alderson - engineer

== See also ==
- Sun Ra discography
