= Constant Martin =

French engineer and inventor

Constant Martin (10 May 1910 – 16 June 1995) was a French engineer and inventor who perfected and successfully commercialised radio sets and most famously the Clavioline, a precursor to the synthesizer. He is the grandfather of director Michel Gondry and Oliver "Twist" Gondry.

After having obtained diplomas in 1930 as an electrical engineer and radio technician, Martin began his career working for Victor Martin (no relation), a manufacturer of radios, where he developed an original receiver. In 1932 in Versailles, he began to experiment with the creation of electronic music. During 1932 to 1937 he developed an instrument related to the organ which used harmonium reeds. The instrument was demonstrated in the Church of Sainte-Odile, Paris in July 1939.

In 1943, he completed the construction of an electronic organ with independent oscillators and harmonic analyzers, which he presented at the Oratoire du Louvre, in the Hôtel des Invalides and at the Palais de Chaillot. He also made the electronic bells that rang out at the city hall to sound the liberation of the city of Versailles. The Clavioline was launched in 1947 with great commercial success. It was manufactured by Selmer in France and the United Kingdom, by Gibson in Kalamazoo, USA, and by Jorgensen in Düsseldorf, Germany. It rapidly became the world's leading monophonic instrument with more than 30,000 sold in the UK alone.

In the 1950s, using the most recent electronic discoveries to improve his organs and bells, Martin demonstrated new electronic bells at the Église Saint-Philippe-du-Roule in Paris. In 1961, using transistors, he was able to add harmonic effects to his instruments to produce sounds that almost faithfully reproduced the sound of a pipe organ. From the early 1960s his electronic sounds could be heard introducing the time on Radio Europe 1, and the announcements at Orly Airport. His Clavioline would be used by famous artists of the day such as The Beatles, Del Shannon, and The Tornados.

Martin was unable to compete when polyphonic synthesizers from Italy, Austria, and the Netherlands were introduced. Nevertheless, for over thirty years, Martin had pioneered and revolutionised the manufacture of electronic instruments and demonstrated the possibility of producing a variety of sounds that could be used in many genres of music.

== Bibliography ==
- Martin, Constant (1950). Musique électronique de l'instrument de musique le plus simple aux orgues électroniques, amélioration d'instruments classiques, cloches électroniques, constructions pratiques. Paris: Technique et vulgarisation. p. 202. LCCN 50031038.
