= Arborea (band) =

American psychedelic folk duo

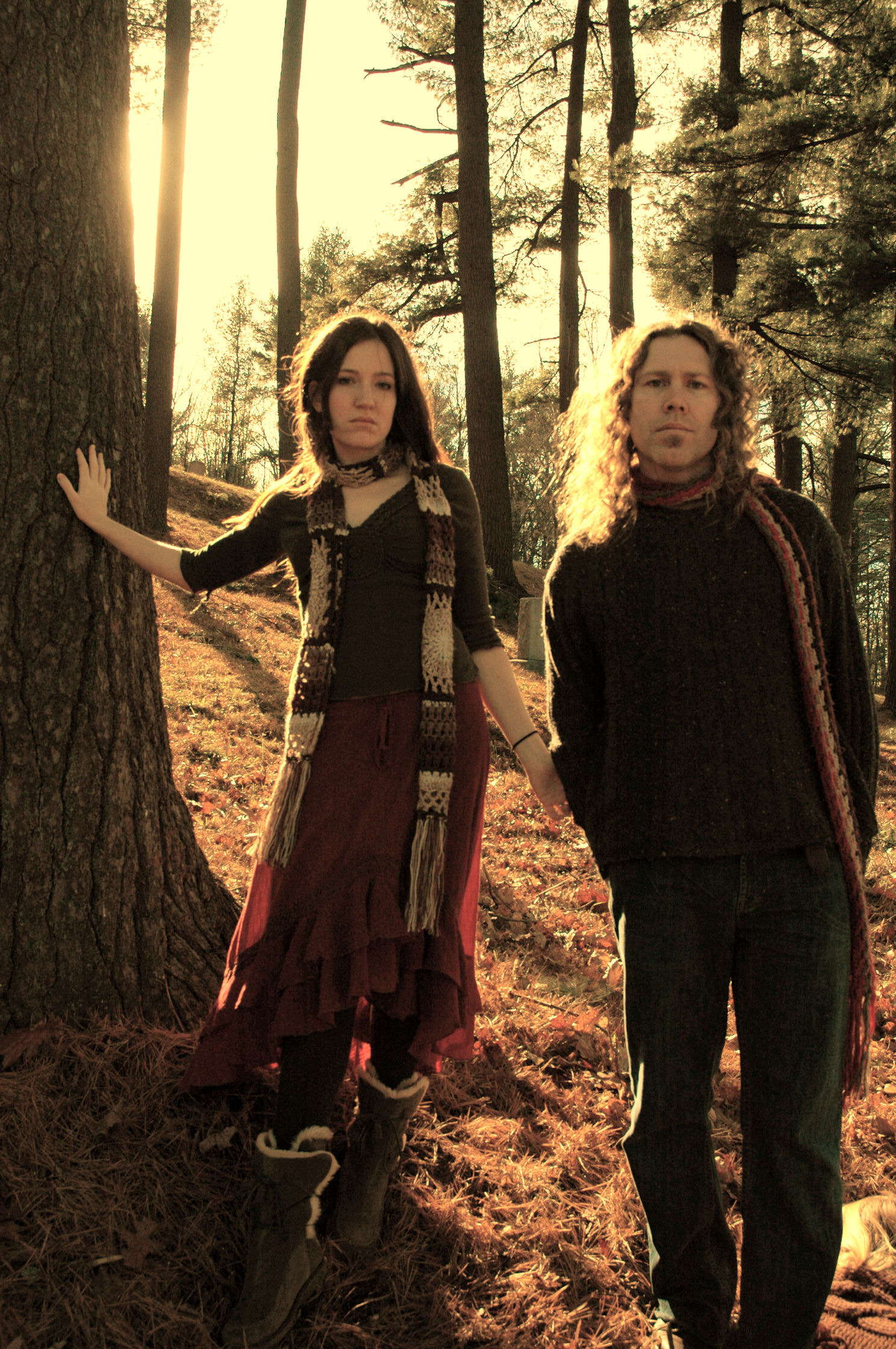

Background information
- Origin: Maine, U.S.
- Genres: Folk, psychedelic folk, freak folk, New Weird America
- Years active: 2005–present
- Label: ESP-Disk
- Members: Buck Curran; Shanti Curran
- Website: Official site

Arborea is an American psychedelic folk duo consisting of husband and wife Buck Curran and Shanti Curran. Buck Curran provides vocals, guitar, slide guitar, and sawing fiddle, while Shanti Curran provides lead vocals, banjo, 'Banjimer' (a type of banjo dulcimer made by Tennessee luthier Gwen Forrester), harmonium, ukulele, sawing fiddle, and hammered dulcimer. They share songwriting, arranging, and producing.

== Recording ==
Arborea's first three albums include their debut Wayfaring Summer (2006), their self-titled album (Fire Museum, 2008), and House of Sticks (Borne! Recordings/Acuarela Discos, 2009), which was distributed in the U.S. by Darla Records.

Arborea curated and produced the compilation album Leaves of Life to help with relief efforts in Africa such as the UN World Food Program. The compilation was released on Borne! Recordings and includes notable artists such as Alela Diane, Devendra Banhart, and Marissa Nadler. The artwork for Leaves of Life was created by musician and artist Hanna Tuulikki.

In 2010 Important Records released We Are All One, in the Sun: A Tribute to Robbie Basho, a compilation album that was produced by Buck Curran. The album features Meg Baird, Helena Espvall, Steffen Basho-Junghans, Glenn Jones, Fern Knight, Cian Nugent, and Grammy-nominated, Iraqi-born oud master Rahim Alhaj.

In 2008 the duo was interviewed for both a Terrascope Online feature article, and the July/Aug 2008 issue of Italy's Blow Up magazine. In 2009 Arborea did a live session and interview in London at BBC Radio 3 for the radio program 'World on 3'with host Mary Ann Kennedy. In 2011 they released their fourth album 'Red Planet' on the Oregon label Strange Attractors Audio House. In April 2012 Arborea was invited to National Public Radio (NPR) headquarters in Washington, D.C., and recorded a Tiny Desk Concert. In 2013 Arborea released their fifth album 'Fortress of the Sun', their first for ESP'-Disk.

In 2016 Arborea's music was featured on the Official Trailer for the movie 'Into the Forest' starring Elliot Page and Evan Rachel Wood. In the Summer of 2016 Buck Curran debuted his first solo album 'Immortal Light', a joint release by ESP-Disk and Buck's new imprint Obsolete Recordings. The album was written, produced, performed, recorded, and mixed entirely by Buck and features Shanti on backing vocals on the songs 'New Moontide' and the CCR cover of 'Bad Moon Rising'. The title track 'Immortal Light' written by Buck features Shanti on lead vocals and harmonium.

== Touring ==
Arborea's first major performance was at the Green Man Festival in Wales in August 2007. In November 2007 they did a brief tour in Spain and performed at the Tanned Tin Festival in Spain that year. After returning to the U.S., they performed on WNYC's Spinning On Air program, with host David Garland. The session first aired in January 2008, and re-aired in November 2008. In December 2008 they travelled back to Europe and spent a month touring in Portugal, Spain, Switzerland, and Italy.

On May 20, 2009, Arborea flew to London and recorded an interview and live session for the BBC Radio 3 program 'BBC World on 3' with host Mary Ann Kennedy. The session was produced by Roger Short and aired on Friday, June 5, 2009.

In January and February 2010 the duo toured in France, Spain, and Italy. While in Spain they performed for the second time at the Tanned Tin Festival. Early in 2010 the duo did a cross-country U.S. tour that included a SXSW showcase at St David's Church/Bethel Hall. Later that year Arborea toured the UK and Ireland which included performances at the Moseley Folk Festival in England and Body & Soul/Electric Picnic Festival in Ireland.

Arborea toured again in Spain, Portugal, England, Ireland, and Scotland in May and June 2011 which included performances at the Body & Soul Summer Solstice Festival in Ireland, Serralves Festival in Portugal, Gea Festival in Spain. They also did two Cinemascore concerts in Spain reinterpreting the soundtrack to the Jim Jarmusch film Dead Man for a live audience while the film was shown in Spanish subtitles.

In 2011 Arborea went on an extensive U.S. cross-country tour in support of Red Planet. While on tour Arborea performed at the Hopscotch Festival in Raleigh, North Carolina, as part of the Artist and Author Series. In March 2012 Arborea showcased for a second time at Bethell Hall in St David's Episcopal Church for their official SXSW showcase. The showcase was attended by many senior music writers and DJs including David Fricke of Rolling Stone, Jon Pareles of the New York Times, Bob Boilen of NPR, and Kevin Cole of KEXP. Following SXSW Arborea was invited to the NPR to record a Tiny Desk Session with Bob Boilen. Their Tiny Desk Session was recorded on 20 April and aired on 17 May 2012. Arborea performed two shows at the 51st Philadelphia Folk Festival in August 2012 which was followed by a short tour with California-based singer-songwriter Mariee Sioux.

During April and May 2013 Arborea did a 16 date tour in France, Spain, and Portugal (29 April through 20 May). During that tour (14-17 May) they supported Low for their tour of Spain which included concerts at theatres in Valencia, Zaragoza, Madrid, and Valladolid. In October Arborea supported Bonnie 'Prince' Billy during a brief east coast tour which included shows at One Longfellow Square in Portland, ME (10 October), at Columbus Theatre in Providence, RI (11 October), and Calvin Theatre in Northampton, MA (12 October). On October 15 they returned to Italy for 9 shows, traveling with Italian singer-guitarist Laboule (Paolo Novellino) who supported the tour. In March 2014 Arborea did a three-week US tour which included shows at Joe's Pub in NYC and their third official SXSW showcase at Bethel Hall/St David's Church in Austin. In July 2014 Arborea performed in Copenhagen and was also a featured act at the Fano Free Folk Festival in Fano, Denmark. In November 2014 Arborea did a brief tour in Ireland which included shows in Dublin at Whelans and Roisin Dubh in Galway. In April and May 2015 Arborea did an extensive tour in Europe (again with Laboule opening) performing 8 shows in Italy, 3 shows in Switzerland, 5 shows in Germany, Denmark, and 4 shows in Sweden. Upon their return to Maine in mid May Arborea took a hiatus from touring.

== Critical reception ==
Wayfaring Summer was part of a feature article on psychedelic folk music in a 2007 issue of Dirty Linen magazine, written by Lahri Bond, who described their music as "timeless" and "haunted by deep shadows". In the 2008 issue of Dream magazine, publisher George Parsons wrote that Wayfaring Summer was "easily one of the best debut albums I've heard in many moons". They received critical acclaim in 2008 from NPR producer Robin Hilton, who described their self-titled album as "an incredibly spare and beautiful collection of songs", and Shanti's voice as "hypnotically beautiful", as well as receiving favorable reviews from the Boston Globe, and the British music magazine The Wire.

House of Sticks received a glowing review from the BBC, and the duo later recorded a session in London for the BBC World on 3 program.

We Are All One, in the Sun made the list of Best Acoustic Albums of 2010 in Acoustic Guitar magazine, was a Top Editors pick in the December issue of Guitar Player, received fours stars in Mojo, and positive reviews from The Wire and Pitchfork.

Red Planet received critical praise, including Top Vinyl Pick in the September 2011 issue of Mojo, Editors Top Pick in the December 2011 issue of Guitar Player, and Best Under-the-Radar Albums of 2011 as listed by senior writer David Fricke in Rolling Stone.

Fortress of the Sun (2013) was released by ESP-Disk, coinciding with the label's 50th Anniversary. The album made AllMusic's Favorite Folk Albums of 2013 and Favorite Singer/Songwriter Albums of 2013, Acoustic Guitar Best Acoustic Albums of 2013, Echoes Best of 2013 Listener Poll, textura's Top Ten Albums of 2013, Portland Phoenix Top Ten Albums of 2013, Folk Radio UK Best Albums of 2013, Mojo 4 Stars.

Bob Boilen included Arborea's SXSW performance among his NPR list of Favorite Concerts of 2012 and recommended live acts.

== Discography ==
- Wayfaring Summer (Summer Street, 2006)
- Arborea (Fire Museum, 2008)
- House of Sticks (Borne!/Darla, 2009)
- Leaves of Life (Borne!/Darla, 2009)
- We Are All One, in the Sun: A Tribute to Robbie Basho (Important, 2010)
- Red Planet (Strange Attractors Audio House, 2011)
- Fortress of the Sun (ESP-Disk, 2013)
