= Pat Patrick (musician) =

American jazz musician (1929–1991)

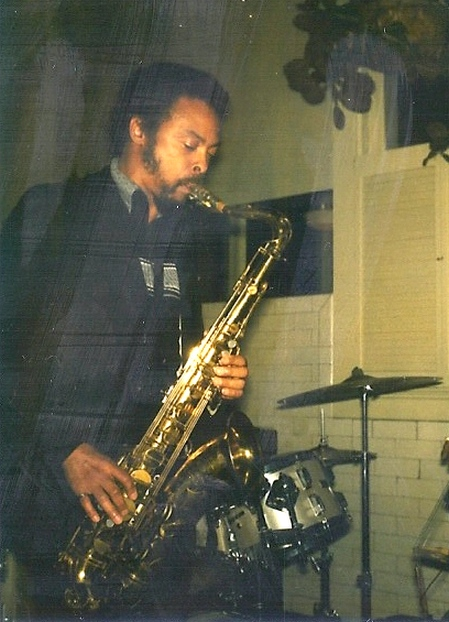
- Patrick in 1981

Background information
- Born: Laurdine Kenneth Patrick Jr. November 23, 1929; East Moline, Illinois, U.S.
- Died: December 31, 1991 (aged 62) Moline, Illinois
- Genres: Avant-garde jazz, free jazz, experimental, swing
- Occupations: Musician, composer
- Instruments: Baritone saxophone, alto saxophone, bass guitar

Laurdine Kenneth "Pat" Patrick Jr. (November 23, 1929 – December 31, 1991) was an American jazz musician and composer. He played baritone saxophone, alto saxophone, and Fender bass and was known for his 40-year association with Sun Ra. His son, Deval Patrick, was formerly governor of Massachusetts.

== Early life ==
Patrick was born in East Moline, Illinois, to Laverne and Laurdine Kenneth Patrick His father (1905–2001), a native of Kansas, worked as an iron moulder at a factory at the time of his son's birth.

Patrick first learned piano, drums, and trumpet as a child, and then switched to saxophones. He attended and studied music at DuSable High School in Chicago, where he met future bassist Richard Davis and future saxophonists John Gilmore and Clifford Jordan. Patrick was baritone saxophonist for the Regal Theater's house band while still at school. "In 1949 he enrolled at Florida Agricultural and Mechanical University, but he soon returned to the Chicago area to study at Wilson Junior College."

== Later life and career ==
Patrick first played in one of Sun Ra's bands as part of a trio around 1950. He played occasionally in Sun Ra's Arkestra from around the same time, and then became a regular band member in 1954. In February 1955, Patrick married Emily Wintersmith in Cook County, Illinois. His children with Emily were Deval Patrick and Rhonda Sigh. He had at least one child, La'Shon Anthony, outside his marriage. In 1959, a woman called for Patrick and his wife asked for a message. This precipitated the breakup of his marriage that year.

In 1960, Patrick left Emily, Deval and Rhonda, and moved out of their apartment. When four-year-old Deval chased after him, he slapped his son and continued. He refused to sign Deval's application to Milton Academy, arguing that Deval would lose his African American identity there. Deval, whose tuition was paid by scholarship, was accepted anyway. Father and son rarely saw each other.

Patrick resided for several years in the Arkestra's communal residences in New York City's East Village and Philadelphia. The Arkestra, with Patrick, moved to New York in 1961. He also played with John Coltrane (appearing on Africa/Brass in 1961), Blue Mitchell (A Sure Thing, 1962), Mongo Santamaría ("Yeh, Yeh", which he composed, and "Watermelon Man") and Thelonious Monk (early 1970s). He also extensively backed Babatunde Olatunji. In December 1965, Patrick married Edna Jean Ballinger in Las Vegas, Nevada.

In 1972, Patrick co-founded the Baritone Saxophone Retinue, which also featured Charles Davis and another four players of the instrument, plus a rhythm section. The group recorded two albums for Saturn Records. He toured Europe with Sun Ra in 1970 and 1976, and was part of some other Arkestra performances in that decade, but he also devoted time to teaching at the State University of New York at Old Westbury. He was a regular member of the Arkestra again from 1986 to 1988. A contributor to Grove Music wrote: "Patrick was a well-schooled, versatile soloist and ensemble player and made an important contribution to Sun Ra's music. Besides his principal instrument, which was baritone saxophone, he played flutes, bass, and percussion."

Patrick died from leukemia in Moline, Illinois, on December 31, 1991.

== Discography ==
=== As leader/co-leader ===
- Sound Advice (Saturn, 1977)

=== As sideman ===
With Terry Adams

- That's the Way I Feel Now: A Tribute to Thelonious Monk (A&M, 1984)

With Jimmy Heath

- Really Big! (Riverside, 1960)

With Andrew Hill

- One for One (Blue Note, 1965)

With Sam Jones

- Down Home (Riverside, 1962)

With Clifford Jordan

- Inward Fire (Muse, 1978)

With Rahsaan Roland Kirk

- The Case of the 3 Sided Dream in Audio Color (Atlantic 1975)

With Freddie McCoy

- Funk Drops (Prestige, 1966)

With Grachan Moncur III and the Jazz Composer's Orchestra

- Echoes of Prayer (JCOA, 1974 [1975])

With James Moody

- Last Train from Overbrook (Argo, 1958)

With A. K. Salim

- Afro-Soul/Drum Orgy (Prestige, 1965)

With Mongo Santamaria

- Go, Mongo! (Riverside, 1962)
- Viva Mongo!
- Introduces La Lupe (Riverside, 1963)
- Watermelon Man! (Riverside, 1963)
- At the Village Gate, (Battle, 1963, reissued, Riverside, 1965)

With Sun Ra

- Jazz By Sun Ra Vol. 1 (Transition, 1957)
- Super-Sonic Jazz (Saturn, 1957)
- Jazz in Silhouette (Saturn, 1959)
- The Futuristic Sounds of Sun Ra (Savoy, 1962)
- When Sun Comes Out (Saturn, 1963)
- Angels and Demons at Play (Saturn, 1965)
- Art Forms Of Dimensions Tomorrow (Saturn, 1965)
- Secrets of the Sun (Saturn, 1965)
- The Heliocentric Worlds of Sun Ra, Volume 1 (ESP Disk, 1965)
- The Heliocentric Worlds Of Sun Ra, Volume 2 (ESP Disk, 1966)
- Nothing Is (ESP Disk, 1966)
- Other Planes of There (Saturn, 1966)
- The Magic City (Saturn, 1966)
- Visits Planet Earth (Saturn, 1966)
- When Angels Speak of Love (Saturn, 1966)
- Interstellar Low Ways (Saturn, 1967)
- Strange Strings (Saturn, 1967)
- Atlantis (Saturn, 1969)
- Nidhamu (Saturn, 1972)

With Phil Upchurch

- Feeling Blue (Milestone, 1967)
