= Clavioline =

Electronic musical keyboard instrument

Clavioline circuit diagrams (U.S. patent 2,563,477)

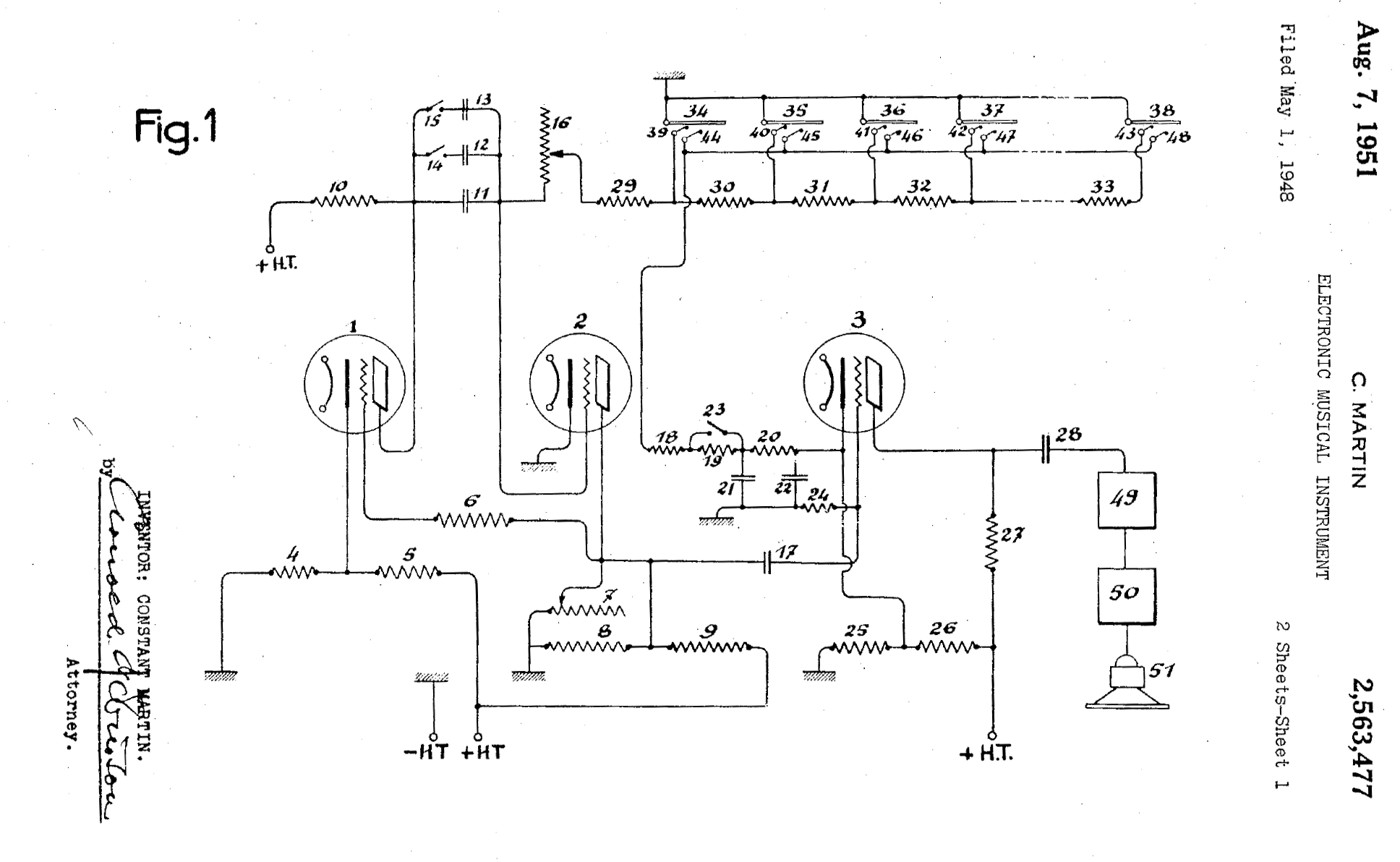
Fig.1 Oscillator and keyboard

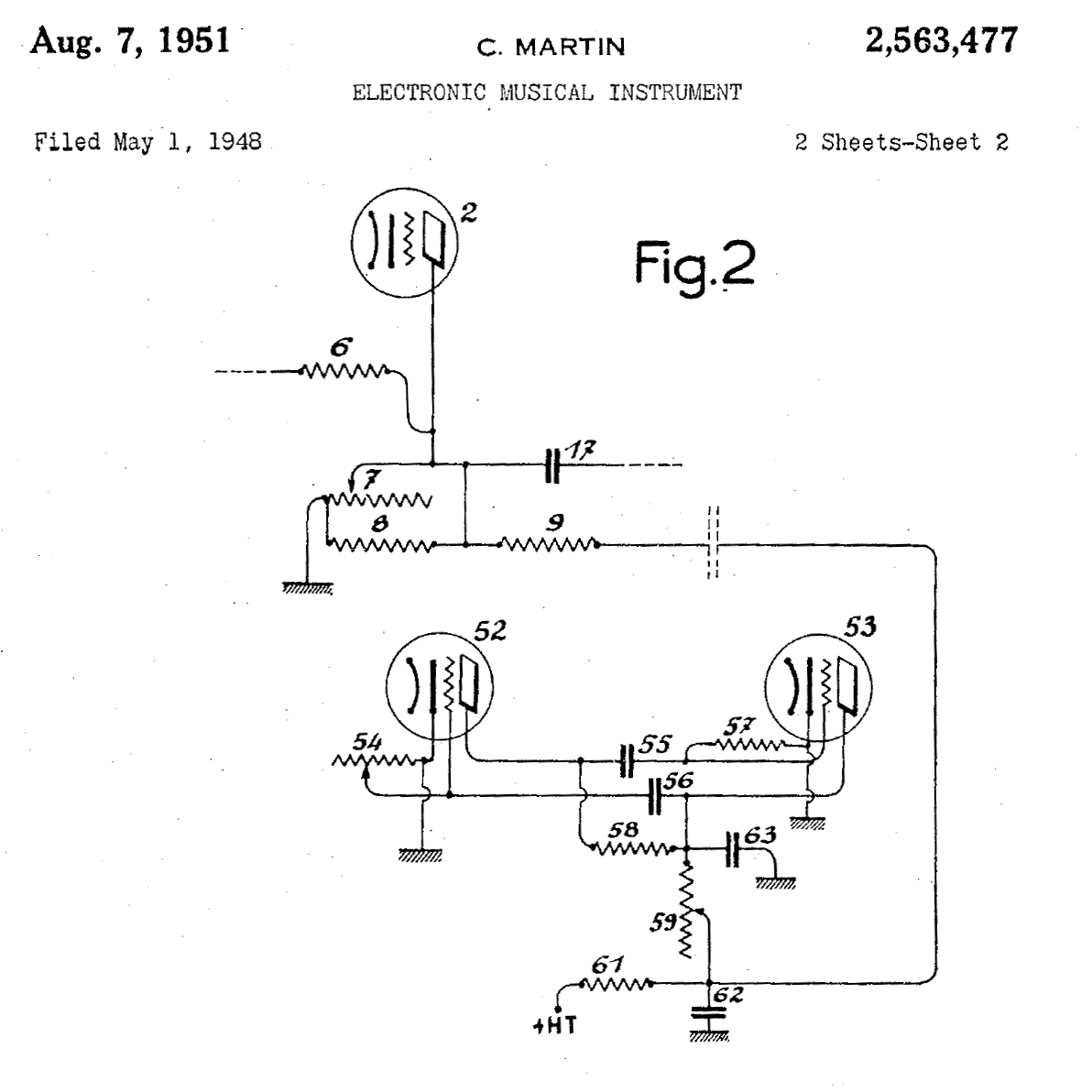
Fig.2 Vibrato effect

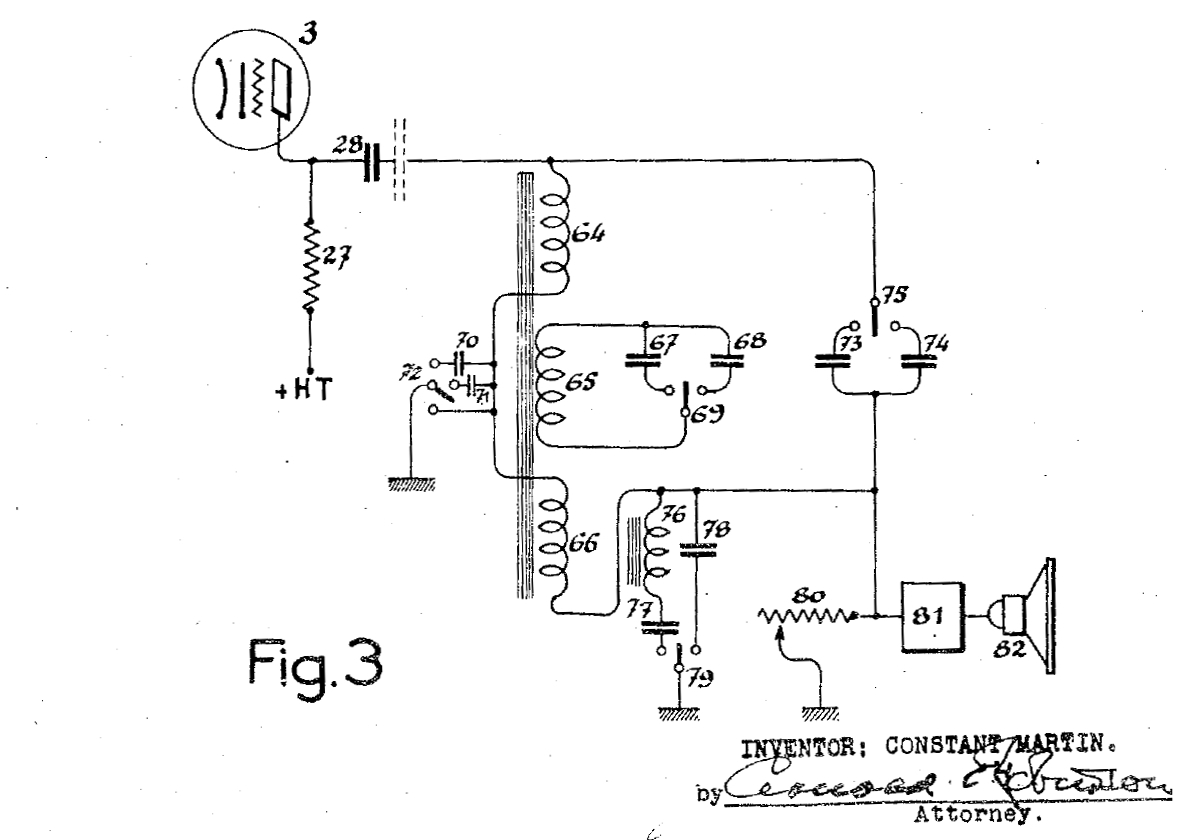
Fig.3 Filter assembly

The clavioline is an electronic analog synthesizer. It was invented by French engineer Constant Martin in 1947 in Versailles.

The instrument consists of a keyboard and a separate amplifier and speaker unit. The keyboard usually covered three octaves, and had a number of switches to alter the tone of the sound produced, add vibrato (a defining feature of the instrument), and provide other effects. The Clavioline used a vacuum tube oscillator to produce a buzzy waveform, almost a square wave, which could then be altered using high-pass and low-pass filtering, as well as the vibrato. The amplifier also aided in creating the instrument's signature tones, by deliberately providing a large amount of distortion.

Several models of the Clavioline were produced by different companies. Among the more important were the Standard, Reverb, and Concert models by Selmer in France and Gibson in the United States in the 1950s. The six-octave model employing octave transposition was developed by Harald Bode and manufactured under license by Jörgensen Electronic in Germany. In England, the Jennings Organ Company's first successful product was the Univox, an early self-powered electronic keyboard inspired by the Selmer Clavioline. In Japan, Ace Tone's first prototype, the Canary S-2 (1962), was based on the Clavioline.

== Recordings ==
The Clavioline has been used on a number of recordings in popular music as well as in film. Along with the Mellotron, it was one of the keyboard instruments favoured by rock and pop musicians during the 1960s before the arrival of the Moog synthesizer.

- "Little Red Monkey" (1953) by Frank Chacksfield’s Tunesmiths features Jack Jordan on clavioline. An earlier recording of the tune by Jack Jordan himself was issued on the His Master's Voice label.
- In 1953–54, Van Phillips composed music for the clavioline for the science-fiction radio trilogy Journey into Space.
- In the Bollywood Hindi film Nagin (1954), Kalyanji Virji Shah plays the snake-charmer tune "Man dole mera, tan dole mere" on the clavioline, under the musical direction of Hemant Kumar.
- "Runaway" and "Hats Off to Larry" (1961) by Del Shannon each feature a bridge solo by Max Crook, performed on a heavily modified clavioline that he called the Musitron.
- English producer Joe Meek began recording with a clavioline in 1960. His production of the Tornados' hit instrumental "Telstar" (1962) features the clavioline or perhaps a Univox, as does the B-side of that single, "Jungle Fever". Author Mark Brend states that, while the exact instrument used has long been open to debate, "there remains a very faint possibility that Meek used a Univox on 'Telstar,' mixed with a Clavioline."
- The jazz albums The Magic City (1966), The Heliocentric Worlds of Sun Ra, Volume Two (1966), and Atlantis (1967) by Sun Ra include clavioline.
- The Beatles used a clavioline on "Baby, You're a Rich Man", which was issued in July 1967 as the B-side of their "All You Need Is Love" single. John Lennon played the instrument on its oboe setting, creating an exotic sound that suggests an Indian shehnai. In his feature article on the clavioline, in Sound on Sound magazine, Gordon Reid pairs "Baby, You're a Rich Man" with "Telstar" as the two seminal pop recordings made with the instrument. The Clavioline that the Beatles used was owned by Olympic Studios in London.
- The Strawbs 1972 album Grave New World includes some clavioline played by their keyboardist Blue Weaver, on the song The Flower And The Young Man.
- The Amon Düül II album Wolf City (1972)
- The White Stripes used a 1959 Univox on their album Icky Thump (2007).
- Darren Allison plays clavioline on William Blake's "Eternity" by Daisy Bell, from their London album (2015).
- John Barry of the John Barry Seven made a recording called "Starfire" which featured the instrument. The clavioline was also used extensively on his Stringbeat LP and other recordings of the period, played by bandleader and future Benny Hill associate Ted Taylor.
- A clavioline appears on Mike Oldfield's 2017 album Return to Ommadawn.

== See also ==
- Ondioline
- Ondes Martenot
- List of electronic instruments
- Synthesizer#Monophonic electronic keyboards

== Sources ==
- Brend, Mark (2005). Strange Sounds: Offbeat Instruments and Sonic Experiments in Pop. San Francisco, CA: Backbeat Books. ISBN 978-0-879308551.
- Holmes, Thom (2012). Electronic and Experimental Music: Technology, Music, and Culture (4th edn). New York, NY: Routledge. ISBN 978-0-415-89636-8.
- MacDonald, Ian (2005). Revolution in the Head: The Beatles' Records and the Sixties (2nd rev. edn). Chicago, IL: Chicago Review Press. ISBN 978-1-55652-733-3.
