= Godz =

American folk and rock band

- Origin: New York City, U.S.
- Genres: Psychedelic rock; avant-garde; psychedelic folk; experimental rock
- Years active: 1966–1973, 2007–2018
- Labels: ESP-Disk, Manta Ray
- Past members: Larry Kessler; Paul Thornton; Jim McCarthy; Jay Dillon; Doug Gussio; Rick Sambuco; Mike Cerri; Mike Diamond
- Website: originalgodz.com

Godz (originally the Godz) were an American folk and rock band formed in New York City in 1966 by guitarist Jim McCarthy, bassist Larry Kessler, autoharpist Jay Dillon, and drummer Paul Thornton. The band began with no musical training or knowledge of how to play their instruments. In late 1966, they auditioned for Bernard Stollman of the avant-garde independent record label ESP-Disk', who signed the band, resulting in them becoming labelmates to the Fugs. Godz released the albums Contact High with the Godz (1966), Godz 2 (1967) and The Third Testament (1968) on ESP, with the latter album employing an improvisational musical collective known as "The Multitude".

American music critic Lester Bangs would cite the Godz as favorites and publish the article "Do the Godz Speak Esperanto?" in Creem magazine in December 1971. In 1973, the Godz recorded a commercial rock album entitled Godzundheit, it would be their final album before disbanding. The Godz would reunite in 2007, although without Jay Dillon who had died in 2002, the band performed shows until 2018.

In April 2019, Paul Thornton died. On March 24, 2022, Larry Kessler was killed when hit by an alleged drunk driver in Baltimore.

== History ==
=== 1960s–1970s ===
The Godz were originally formed by guitarist Jim McCarthy, bassist Larry Kessler, autoharpist Jay Dillon, and drummer Paul Thornton. They started the band after Larry Kessler met Jim McCarthy and Paul Thornton when they all took jobs in the 49th Street location of the musical instruments store Sam Goody's.

According to McCarthy they came up with their musical approach on this situation: "One day Paul came over to visit them, and the three gathered in Larry's living room to smoke a joint." What happened next was purely accidental, according to Jim: "There were all these percussive instruments lying around and out of total frustration, I got up and started shaking a tambourine or something like that, and that's how it all started. We all started to get up and make noise like a bunch of maniacs, expressing our frustration."

After this event, "Larry made a suggestion that had both Jim and Paul questioning his sanity: that the three audition this impromptu 'band' for ESP." Kessler had been working for the ESP-Disk jazz record label which was founded by Bernard Stollman. ESP also released recordings by another underground rock band from this era from New York City, the Fugs which heavily influenced the band. The group auditioned for Bernard Stollman of ESP-Disk in late 1966. Larry Kessler recalled, "I invited Stollman to a party where we performed ‘White Cat Heat’. He loved it and booked three hours at A-1 studios in NYC, to cut a single and we did an entire album... He was upset at first but he liked it enough to put it out."

The Godz' first recording session took place on September 28, 1966, from which came their first album Contact High released in 1966. Kessler stated "The engineer loved us and actually played on the record. He never saw anything like us and wanted to be a part of it, so he ran out during the recording and made some noise just to be on the album. I think that was the effect the Godz had on people, they wanted to be a part of it and the basic simplicity of it meant that they could."

Godz released their second LP in 1967 called Godz 2. Without Jay Dillon, the remaining three Godz recorded The Third Testament (1968), which involved more conventional songwriting as well as several friends being invited to improvise in the studio, under the name "The Multitude". The final original album of the original lineup would be Godzundheit (1973).

=== 2000s–2020s ===
In July 2005, Jay Dillon's niece posted a message stating that he had died several years before. In early 2007, the surviving members, Jim McCarthy, Larry Kessler, and Paul Thornton, reunited to produce new recordings. Six of these recordings appear on The Godz Remastered, released by Manta Ray Records in 2012 and another three of the recordings from this session appear on Gift from the Godz released in 2014 by Manta Ray Records. In late 2014, Larry Kessler put together a road band and billed the experience as L.L. Kessler's "GODZ" show with shows across the northeast of the United States.

In 2015, Larry Kessler's "Godz" started working on new material for release. The singles "Hungry for Love" and "America" came from these sessions. There were sporadic shows in New York, Washington D.C. and Baltimore, a few of the appearances including original member Paul Thornton. On April 29, 2016, Thornton made his final appearance with The Godz at film director Jeffrey Wengrofsky's residency at Howl! Happening in New York City. In 2018, Larry Kessler's "Godz" performed at the Sowebo and Charles Village festivals in Baltimore. In 2019, the band welcomed the arrival of Mike Walker on drums, and Charles Walker on keyboards and backing vocals. Larry Kessler's "Godz" recorded "Thanks," released by Manta Ray Records later that year.

In 2019, Jeffrey Wengrofsky released Here to Eternity with the Godz, a short film featuring Larry Kessler. Also in 2019, The Godz were featured in Issue 87 of Shindig! magazine.

In April 2019, Paul Thornton was reported to have died. Larry Kessler was killed when hit by an alleged drunk driver in Baltimore on March 24, 2022.

== Legacy ==
Lester Bangs published "Do the Godz Speak Esperanto?" in Creem magazine (December 1971): "What makes them so special? Well, theoretically, anybody can play like that, but in actual practice, it just ain't so. Most people would be too stultified – after all, what's the point of doing it if anybody can? – and as for you, you probably ain't got the balls to do it, and even if you did, you'd never carry it through like a true Godzly musical maniac must to qualify. You'd just pick it up and tootle a few bars to prove something, and that's entirely different. Me, I could do it because I have been years, even before I heard of the Godz. All it takes is insane persistence and a total disregard for everything but getting that yawp out of you if you gotta howl at the moon, and obviously most folks aren't gonna howl at the moon just to prove a point. But the Godz would! And not to prove a point, but because they like howling at the moon! Which is what sets them apart."

John Dougan from AllMusic describes The Godz as follows: "Few bands in the annals of rock & roll were stranger than the New York City-based Godz...the Godz coughed up some of the strangest, most dissonant, purposely incompetent rock noise ever produced...Sounding like a prototype for Half Japanese or the Shaggs, the Godz play as if they discovered their instruments ten minutes before the tape started rolling. The singing is intentionally off-key, almost parodic, and the songs...well, they sound more like improvised snippets than actual compositions. And while that may not be your idea of pop music, this works, in large part, due to the absolute glee and unself-consciousness with which they approached their peculiar brand of aural nonsense."

== Discography ==
- Contact High with the Godz (1966) ESP-Disk 1037
- Godz 2 (1967) ESP-Disk 1047
- The Third Testament (1968) ESP-Disk 1077
- Godzundheit (1973) ESP-Disk 2017
- The Godz Remastered (compilation, 2012) Manta Ray Records QS938
- Gift from the Godz (2014) Manta Ray Records MR 0155
- "Hungry for Love" (single, 2015) Manta Ray Records MR 0211
- "America" (single, 2016) Manta Ray Records MR 0243
- America (EP, 2019) Manta Ray Records MR 0296

Side projects

- Alien – Jim McCarthy (1973) ESP-Disk 3008
- Pass On This Side – (Paul) Thornton, Fradkin & Unger and the Big Band (1974) ESP-Disk 63019

== Members ==
- Jay Dillon (original member) – vocals, autoharp (died 2002)
- Jim McCarthy (original member) – vocals, guitar, flute, harmonica
- Larry Kessler (original member) – vocals, violin, bass guitar (died 2022)
- Paul Thornton (original member) – vocals, guitar, drums, maracas (died April 2019)
- Mike Cerri – horns
- Rick Sambuco – guitar
- Mike Diamond – bass
- Mike Walker – drums
- Charles Walker – keyboard
- Doug Gussio – drums
