= Ronnie Boykins =

American jazz bassist (1935–1980)

- Birth name: Ronald Boykins
- Born: December 17, 1935
- Origin: Chicago, Illinois, U.S.
- Died: April 20, 1980 (aged 44); New York City, U.S.
- Genres: Jazz
- Occupation: Musician
- Instrument: Double bass
- Formerly of: Sun Ra

Ronald Boykins (December 17, 1935 – April 20, 1980) was a jazz bassist and is best known for his work with pianist/bandleader Sun Ra, although he had played with such disparate musicians as Muddy Waters, Johnny Griffin, and Jimmy Witherspoon prior to joining Sun Ra's Arkestra.

== Biography ==
Like his fellow Sun Ra bandmates, John Gilmore and Pat Patrick, Boykins attended Chicago's DuSable High School and studied under its famed music teacher "Captain" Walter Dyett. He also studied with Ernie Shepard, who would later work with Duke Ellington. Boykins joined the Arkestra in 1958, during the Chicago period, and travelled with them to Canada and then to New York City. Boykins has been described as "the pivot around which much of Sun Ra's music revolved for eight years, as well as one of the most determining elements in the sound of the Arkestra." This is especially pronounced on the key recordings from 1965 (The Magic City, The Heliocentric Worlds of Sun Ra, Volume One and The Heliocentric Worlds of Sun Ra, Volume Two) where the intertwining lines of Boykins' bass and Ra's electronic keyboards provide the cohesion. Boykins' arco solo on Sun Ra's "Rocket No. 9 Take Off for Planet Venus" from 1960 may be the first recorded example of the bass being played in a horn-like manner within a relatively free context, predating similar work by Alan Silva and David Izenzon. Boykins appeared on more than fifty Sun Ra albums, and was a regular member of Sun Ra's band from 1958 until 1966, and occasionally thereafter.

Before joining Ra, Boykins had joined with a trombonist friend to open a private club—The House of Culture—with the intent of promoting black culture.

In 1962, Boykins recorded with the hard bop tenor saxophonist Bill Barron and, the next year, with pianist Elmo Hope. Boykins worked with tenor saxophonist Archie Shepp's New York Contemporary Five in 1964. He left Ra in 1966, ostensibly to pursue more lucrative opportunities. Ra had a difficult time finding a replacement, at times settling for playing his own bass lines on keyboard.

In the late '60s, Boykins formed his own group, the Free Jazz Society, which included the pianist John Hicks.

In the '70s, Boykins played with the Melodic Art-Tet, a cooperative free jazz ensemble that also included drummer Roger Blank, saxophonist Charles Brackeen, and trumpeter Ahmed Abdullah. A recording of the group, with William Parker playing in place of Boykins, was released by NoBusiness Records in 2013.

In 1974, the bassist led a session for ESP Disk that produced his sole LP as a leader, The Will Come, Is Now. Reviewer Jerry D'Souza wrote: "Boykins made just one record as leader, but it marks his place as an adventurous bassist and a composer with a gift for style and genre."

In 1979, he played with Steve Lacy and Dennis Charles on Capers. In the course of his career, Boykins also worked with Mary Lou Williams, Marion Brown, and Sarah Vaughan, among others.

Bassist Joshua Abrams dedicated the track titled "Stigmergy", from the album Since Time Is Gravity, to Boykins, commenting: "Boykins remains one of the most under-acknowledged bassists of the music, a gravitational force within the Arkestra. I've always been a fan of the open spaces that paired his bowing with Ra's early synth explorations."

Boykins died in New York City in 1980 at the age of 44.

== Discography ==
=== As leader ===
- 1975: The Will Come, Is Now (ESP-Disk)

=== As sideman ===
For albums with Sun Ra see the Sun Ra discography

- 1963: Elmo Hope - Sounds from Rikers Island (Audio Fidelity)
- 1964: George Benson - The New Boss Guitar (Verve)
- 1964: Bill Barron, Ted Curson & Orchestra - Now, Hear This! (Audio Fidelity)
- 1964: Bill Dixon 7-tette/Archie Shepp and the New York Contemporary 5 (Savoy)
- 1965: Marion Brown - Marion Brown Quartet (ESP-Disk)
- 1966: Eric Kloss - Grits & Gravy (Prestige)
- 1967: Rahsaan Roland Kirk - Now Please Don't You Cry, Beautiful Edith (Verve)
- 1974: Sam Rivers - Crystals (Impulse!)
- 1975: Charles Tyler - Voyage from Jericho (Akba) with Earl Cross, Steve Reid, Arthur Blythe
- 1975: Joe Lee Wilson & Bond Street - What Would It Be Without You (Survival)
- 1976: Mary Lou Williams - A Grand Night for Swinging (Highnote) with Roy Haynes
- 1977: Sam Rivers Tuba Trio / Earl Cross Sextet - Jazz Of The Seventies / Una Muy Bonita (Circle)
- 1977: David Eyges - The Captain (Chiaroscuro)
- 1978: Charles Tyler - Saga of the Outlaws (Nessa Records) with Earl Cross, Steve Reid, John Ore
- 1978: Charles Tyler - Live in Europe (AK) with Ronnie Boykins (bass); Steve Reid (drums, percussion); Melvin Smith (guitar)
- 1979: Steve Lacy - Capers (later released as N.Y. Capers & Quirks) (hat Hut)
- 1979: Cha Cha Shaw - Kingdom Come (Folkways)
