= ESP-Disk' =

American record company and label

- Founded: 1963
- Founder: Bernard Stollman
- Genre: Free jazz; free improvisation; folk rock; underground rock
- Country of origin: U.S.
- Location: Brooklyn, New York
- Official website: www.espdisk.com

ESP-Disk' is a New York–based record company and label founded in 1963 by lawyer Bernard Stollman.

== History ==
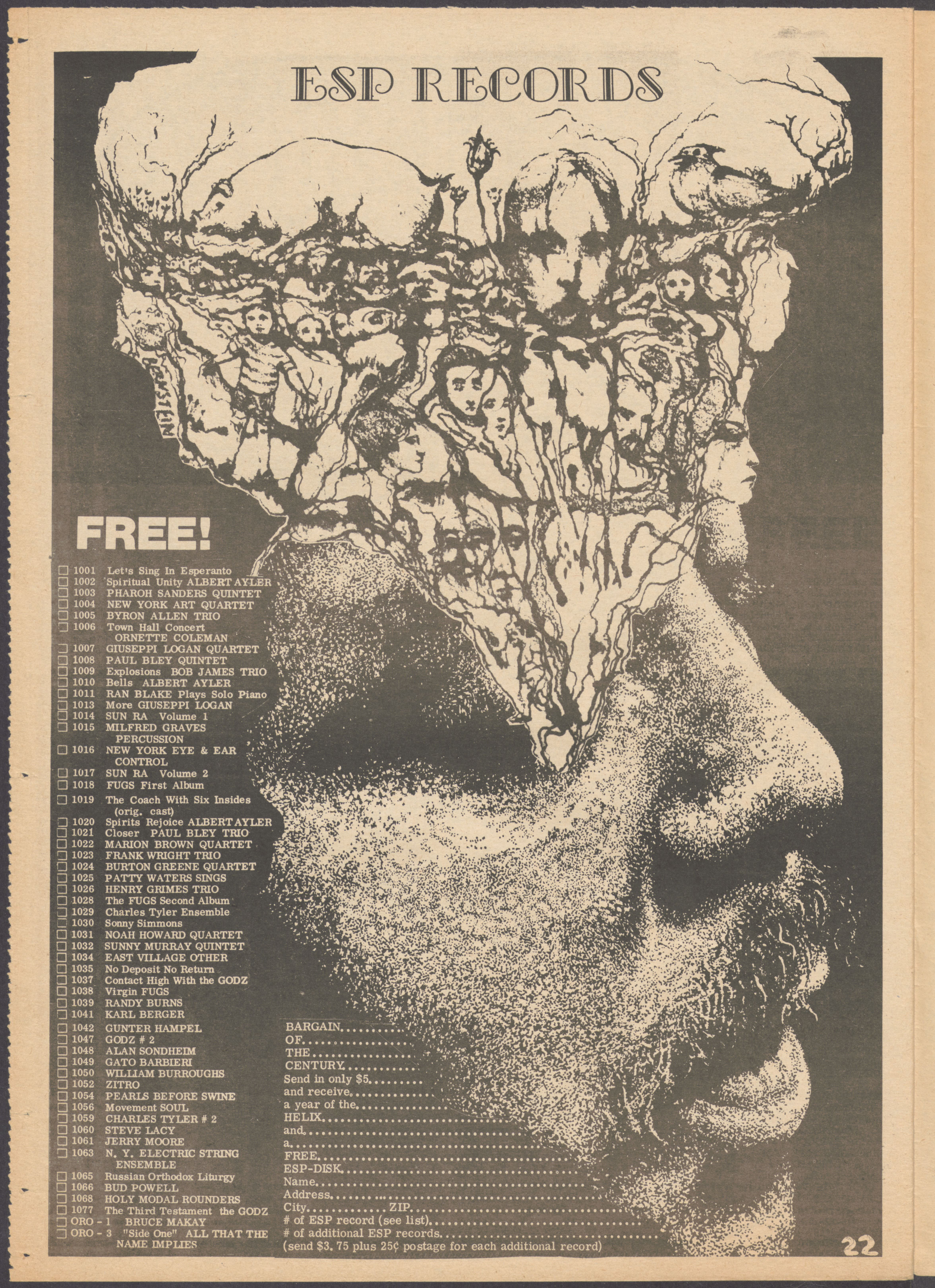
A 1968 ad in Seattle underground paper Helix offers a free ESP-Disk' with a year's subscription.

Though it originally existed to release Esperanto-based music, beginning with its second release (Albert Ayler's Spiritual Unity), ESP became the most important exponent of what is commonly referred to as free jazz. Early releases included albums by Paul Bley, Pharoah Sanders and Sun Ra. ESP also released recordings by uncommercial underground rock acts including the Fugs, the Godz and Pearls Before Swine. The label's motto is "The artists alone decide what you will hear."

Bernard Stollman faced allegations of not paying royalties to the artists that were signed to ESP-Disk'. Tom Rapp of the band Pearls Before Swine claimed that: "We never got any money from ESP. Never, not even like a hundred dollars or something. My real sense is that he [Stollman] was abducted by aliens, and when he was probed it erased his memory of where all the money was". Peter Stampfel of the band Holy Modal Rounders and the Fugs claimed that Stollman told him that "the contract says that all rights belong to me. You have no royalties ever, ever, ever. The publishing is mine. You don't own the songs anymore. We don't owe you anything". Members of the Fugs have also stated claims that they received an unfavourable record contract. Ed Sanders said that "our royalty rate was less than 3%, one of the lower percentages in the history of western civilization". 801 Magazine, which featured an interview with Stollman in 2008, said that Stollman claimed that "he paid all the recording costs and gave the musicians small advances", and that "he never made any money from the music".

== See also ==
- BYG Actuel
- AACM
- List of record labels
