= Sleeping Beauty (Sun Ra album) =

Studio album by Sun Ra and His Intergalactic Myth Science Solar Arkestra
- Released: 1979
- Recorded: November 1, 1979
- Genre: Avant-garde jazz, jazz fusion, modern big band, post-bop
- Length: 29:53
- Label: El Saturn; 11-1-79
- Producer: Peter Dennett (reissue)

Sun Ra chronology
On Jupiter (1979)	Sleeping Beauty (1979)	Live from Soundscape (1979)

Sleeping Beauty is an album by jazz composer, bandleader and keyboardist Sun Ra and his Intergalactic Myth Science Solar Arkestra, recorded in 1979 and originally released on Ra's Saturn label and rereleased on CD on Art Yard in 2008.

== Reception ==
The AllMusic review by Sean Westergaard stated, "This is the great late-night Sun Ra chillout album you never knew about. The band had been working in a more groove-oriented setting off and on for over a year, as evidenced by the albums Lanquidity and On Jupiter, with both featuring prominent electric bass and electric guitar".

Professional ratings
Review scores
Source	Rating
AllMusic	4.5/5 stars

== Track listing ==
All compositions by Sun Ra

1. "Springtime Again" – 9:12
2. "Door of the Cosmos" – 8:53
3. "Sleeping Beauty" – 11:48

== Personnel ==
- Sun Ra – piano, electric piano, organ
- Michael Ray – trumpet, flugelhorn
- Walter Miller – trumpet
- Tony Bethel, Craig Harris – trombone
- Vincent Chancey – French horn
- Marshall Allen – alto saxophone, flute
- John Gilmore – tenor saxophone, percussion
- Danny Ray Thompson – baritone saxophone, flute
- Eloe Omoe – bass clarinet, flute
- James Jacson – bassoon, flute, percussion
- Disco Kid – electric guitar
- Richard Williams – electric bass
- Harry Wilson – vibraphone
- Atakatune – percussion
- Luqman Ali – drums
- June Tyson and the band – vocals
