= Nidhamu =

Live album by Sun Ra and his Arkestra
- Released: 1972
- Recorded: December 12–17, 1971
- Genre: Free Jazz
- Label: El Saturn Records / Thoth Intergalactic

Sun Ra and his Arkestra chronology
Live in Egypt 1 (1972)	Nidhamu (1972)	Horizon (1972)

Nidhamu is a recording by the jazz musician Sun Ra and his 21 member Astro-Intergalactic-Infinity Arkestra, documenting their 1971 tour of Egypt.

All tracks were recorded in Egypt excluding the album’s title track, which was recorded in Holland 1971.

== Track listing ==
1. "Space Loneliness #2"
2. "Discipline #11"
3. "Discipline #15"
4. "Nidhamu"

== Personnel ==
- John Gilmore - tenor saxophone
- Danny Davis - alto saxophone, flute
- Marshall Allen - alto saxophone, flute, oboe
- Kwame Hadi - trumpet, conga drums
- Pat Patrick - baritone saxophone
- Elo Omoe - bass clarinet
- Tommy Hunter - percussion
- Danny Ray Thompson - baritone saxophone, flute
- June Tyson - vocal
- Larry Narthington - alto saxophone, conga drum
- Lex Humphries - percussion
- Hakim Rahim - alto saxophone, flute
- Sun Ra - organ, rocksichord, piano
- Tam Fiofori - engineer
