= Strange Celestial Road =

Studio album by Sun Ra
- Released: 1980
- Recorded: 1979
- Studio: Variety, New York
- Genre: Free jazz
- Length: 35:07
- Label: Rounder; 3035

Sun Ra chronology
Of Mythic Worlds (1979)	Strange Celestial Road (1980)	I, Pharaoh (1979)

Strange Celestial Road is an album by jazz composer, bandleader and keyboardist Sun Ra and his Arkestra, recorded in New York in 1979 and originally released on the Rounder label.

== Reception ==
The AllMusic review by Sean Westergaard stated: "This is an overlooked album in an unwieldy discography, but it's a real gem".

Professional ratings
Review scores
Source	Rating
AllMusic	4/5 stars
The Rolling Stone Jazz Record Guide	3/5 stars
Spin Alternative Record Guide	9/10

== Track listing ==
All compositions by Sun Ra

1. "Celestial Road" - 7:02
2. "Say" - 12:05
3. "I'll Wait for You" - 16:00

== Personnel ==
- Sun Ra - electric piano, organ, synthesizer
- Michael Ray, Curt Pulliam, Walter Miller - trumpet
- Craig Harris, Tony Bethel - trombone
- Vincent Chancey - French horn
- Marshall Allen - alto saxophone, flute
- John Gilmore - tenor saxophone, percussion
- James Jacson - flute, bassoon, percussion
- Eloe Omoe - bass clarinet, flute
- Danny Ray Thompson - baritone saxophone, flute
- Kenny Williams - tenor saxophone, baritone saxophone, flute
- Knoel Scott - alto saxophone, baritone saxophone
- Hutch Jones - alto saxophone, tenor saxophone
- Sylvester Baton - reeds
- Skeeter McFarland, Taylor Richardson - electric guitar
- Steve Clark - electric bass
- Richard Williams - bass
- Harry Wilson, Damon Choice - vibraphone
- Luqman Ali, Reg McDonald - drums
- Atakatune - percussion
- June Tyson, Rhoda Blount - vocals
