= Live in Egypt, Vol. I: Nature's God (Dark Myth Equation Visitation) =

Live album by Sun Ra

Live album by Sun Ra and his Arkestra
- Released: 1972
- Recorded: December 12–16, 1971
- Genre: Free jazz
- Label: El Saturn Records / Thoth Intergalactic

Sun Ra and his Arkestra chronology
It's After the End of the World (1972)	Live in Egypt, Vol. I: Nature's God (Dark Myth Equation Visitation) (1972)	Nidhamu (1972)

Live in Egypt, Vol. I: Nature's God (Dark Myth Equation Visitation) is a recording by the jazz musician Sun Ra and his Astro-Intergalactic-Infinity Arkestra, documenting their first visit to Egypt.

Tracks 1–4 are from a television broadcast on December 16, 1971, and include an interview with Sun Ra; tracks 5–7 are recordings made at a domestic concert in Heliopolis 4 days previously.

In various editions, the record has sometimes been known by other titles, "Dark Myth Equation Visitation" and "Nature's God"

== Track listing ==
1. "Discipline 27"
2. "Solar-Ship Voyage"
3. "Cosmo-Darkness"
4. "The Light Thereof"
5. "Friendly Galaxy No 2"
6. "To Nature's God"
7. "Why Go To The Moon?"

== Personnel ==
- John Gilmore - tenor saxophone
- Danny Davis - alto saxophone, flute
- Marshall Allen - alto saxophone, flute, oboe
- Kwame Hadi - trumpet, conga drums
- Pat Patrick - baritone saxophone
- Elo Omoe - bass clarinet
- Tommy Hunter - percussion
- Danny Ray Thompson - baritone saxophone, flute
- June Tyson - vocal
- Larry Narthington - alto saxophone, conga drum
- Lex Humphries - percussion
- Clifford Jarvis - percussion
- Hakim Rahim - alto saxophone, flute
- Sun Ra - organ, Mini Moog, piano
- Tam Fiofori - engineer
