= Live at Pit-Inn, Tokyo, Japan, 8, 8, 1988 =

Live album by Sun Ra Arkestra
- Released: 1988
- Recorded: August 8, 1988
- Venue: Pit Inn, Shinjuku, Tokyo
- Genre: Free jazz
- Length: 58:22
- Label: DIW
- Producer: Kohei Kawakami & Zen Matsuura

Sun Ra chronology
| Hours After (1986) | Live at Pit-Inn, Tokyo, Japan, 8, 8, 1988 (1988) | Somewhere Else (1989) |

Live at Pit-Inn, Tokyo, Japan, 8, 8, 1988, AKA Cosmo Omnibus Imagiable Illusion, is a live album by jazz composer, bandleader and keyboardist Sun Ra and his Arkestra recorded in Tokyo in 1988 and released on the Japanese DIW label.

== Reception ==
The AllMusic review by Jesse Jarnow awarded the album 3 stars stating "The recording captures the band sympathetically, managing to keep the chaos under control through a crisp and deep mix... a good introduction to Sun Ra's work".

Professional ratings
Review scores
| Source | Rating |
|---|---|
| AllMusic | 3/5 stars |

== Track listing ==
All compositions by Sun Ra except as indicated

1. " Introduction/Cosmo Approach Prelude" – 7:29
2. "Angel Race/I Wait for You" – 7:18
3. "Can You Take It?" – 3:14
4. "If You Came from Nowhere Here" – 10:27
5. "Astro Black" – 11:23
6. "Prelude to a Kiss" (Duke Ellington, Irving Gordon) – 5:11
7. "Why Was I Born?" (Oscar Hammerstein II, Jerome Kern) – 5:57
8. "Insterstellar Lo-Ways" – 7:23

== Personnel ==
- Sun Ra – piano, synthesizer, vocals
- Michael Ray – trumpet, vocals on "Why Was I Born?"
- Ahmed Abdullah – trumpet
- Tyrone Hill – trombone
- Marshall Allen – alto saxophone
- John Gilmore – tenor saxophone, timbales
- Danny Ray Thompson – baritone saxophone
- Eloe Omoe – bass clarinet, alto saxophone, contra-alto clarinet
- June Tyson – violin, vocals on "Astro Black"
- Bruce Edwards – electric guitar
- Rollo Radford – electric bass
- Eric Walker, Earl "Buster" Smith – drums
