= Live from Soundscape (Sun Ra album) =

Live album by Sun Ra Arkestra
- Released: July 21, 1994
- Recorded: November 10 & 11, 1979
- Venue: Soundscape, NYC
- Genre: Free jazz
- Length: 140:36
- Label: DIW; DIW 388
- Producer: Verna Gillis

Sun Ra chronology
Sleeping Beauty (1979)	Live from Soundscape (1994)	Of Mythic Worlds (1979)

Live from Soundscape is a live album by jazz composer, bandleader and keyboardist Sun Ra and his Arkestra recorded in New York City in 1979 and released on the Japanese DIW label in 1994. Initial pressings of the album contained a bonus CD featuring a lecture by Sun Ra.

== Reception ==
The Allmusic review by Sean Westergaard awarded the album 3 stars stating "Sound quality, while good, is not perfect, gearing the release more towards the serious fan".

Professional ratings
Review scores
Source	Rating
Allmusic	3/5 stars

== Track listing ==
All compositions by Sun Ra except where noted

Disc One:

1. "Astro Black" – 11:52
2. "Where There Is No Sun" – 4:05
3. "Living in the Space Age" – 2:03
4. "Keep Your Sunny Side Up" (Lew Brown, Buddy DeSylva, Ray Henderson) – 2:52
5. "D.27" – 12:36
6. "Watusi" – 12:23
7. "Space Is the Place" – 7:56
8. "We Travel the Space Ways " – 7:33
9. "On Jupiter, the Skies are Always Blue" – 6:40

Disc Two:

1. The Possibility of Altered Destiny – 72:40

== Personnel ==
- Sun Ra – piano, keyboards
- Michael Ray – trumpet, vocals
- Walter Miller – trumpet
- Vincent Chancey – French horn
- Charles Stephens – trombone
- Marshall Allen – alto saxophone
- Skeeter McFarland – electric guitar
- Damon Choice – vibraphone
- Richard Williams – bass
- Luqman Ali – drums
- Atakatune – percussion
- June Tyson – vocals, dance
