= Horizon (Sun Ra album) =

Live album by Sun Ra and his Arkestra
- Released: 1972
- Recorded: December 17, 1971
- Genre: Free Jazz
- Label: El Saturn Records / Thoth Intergalactic

Sun Ra and his Arkestra chronology
Nidhamu (1972)	Horizon (1972)	Space is the Place (1972)

Horizon is a recording by the jazz musician Sun Ra and his Astro-Intergalactic-Infinity Arkestra, forming part of the documentation of their first visit to Egypt.

It was recorded at the Ballon Theatre, Cairo.

In various editions, the record has sometimes been known by the other title of "Starwatchers"

== Track listing ==
Original LP:

1. "Starwatchers/Theme of the Stargazers"
2. "Discipline 2"
3. "Shadow World"
4. "Third Planet"
5. "Space Is the Place"
6. "Horizon"
7. "Discipline 8"

CD reissue:

No.	Title	Length
1.	"Theme of the Star Gazers"	1:22
2.	"Discipline #2"	5:28
3.	"The Shadow World"	16:42
4.	"Enlightenment"	2:37
5.	"Love in Outer Space"	7:13
6.	"Third Planet"	6:44
7.	"Space Is the Place"	6:10
8.	"Horizon"	5:31
9.	"Discipline #8"	11:22
10.	"We'll Wait for You"	1:38
11.	"The Satellites Are Spinning"	11:14

== Personnel ==
- John Gilmore - tenor saxophone
- Danny Davis - alto saxophone, flute
- Marshall Allen - alto saxophone, flute, oboe
- Kwame Hadi - trumpet, conga drums
- Pat Patrick - baritone saxophone
- Elo Omoe - bass clarinet
- Tommy Hunter - percussion
- Danny Ray Thompson - baritone saxophone, flute
- June Tyson - vocal
- Larry Narthington - alto saxophone, conga drum
- Lex Humphries - percussion
- Clifford Jarvis - percussion
- Hakim Rahim - alto saxophone, flute
- Sun Ra - organ, Mini Moog, piano
- Tam Fiofori - engineer
