= Some Blues But Not the Kind That's Blue =

Studio album by Sun Ra and His Arkestra
- Released: 1977
- Recorded: May 3, 1973, and October 14, 1977
- Studios: Philadelphia and Variety, NY
- Genre: Free jazz
- Length: 71:46
- Labels: Saturn; 1014077
- Producers: Adam Abraham, John Corbett

Sun Ra chronology
Somewhere Over the Rainbow (1977)	Some Blues But Not the Kind That's Blue (1977)	Of Mythic Worlds (1979)

Some Blues But Not the Kind That's Blue is an album by American jazz composer, bandleader and keyboardist Sun Ra and his Arkestra. It was recorded in 1977, originally released on Ra's Saturn label in 1977, and rereleased on CD on Atavistic's Unheard Music Series in 2008.

== Reception ==
Professional ratings
Review scores
Source	Rating
AllMusic	4/5 stars
The Village Voice	A−

The AllMusic review by Sean Westergaard stated: "Although recorded about a decade apart, Some Blues But Not the Kind That's Blue is of a piece with Blue Delight: mostly standards albums that really put the spotlight on Sun Ra's piano playing and the tenor artistry of John Gilmore. Although the Arkestra is notorious for its outside playing and cacophonous tendencies, this album shows they could play it straight as well as anyone in the game. Wonderful stuff".

== Track listing ==
All compositions by Sun Ra except as indicated

1. "Some Blues But Not the Kind Thats Blue" - 8:15
2. "II'll Get By" (Fred E. Ahlert, Roy Turk) - 7:18
3. "My Favorite Things" (Oscar Hammerstein II, Richard Rodgers) - 10:01
4. "Untitled" - 7:06 Bonus track on CD reissue
5. "Nature Boy" (eden ahbez) - 8:52
6. "Tenderly" (Walter Gross, Jack Lawrence) - 7:30
7. "Black Magic" (Harold Arlen, Johnny Mercer) - 8:38
8. "'ll Get By" [alternate take I] (Ahlert, Turk) - 7:24 Bonus track on CD reissue
9. "I'll Get By" [alternate take II] (Ahlert, Turk) - 6:42 Bonus track on CD reissue

== Personnel ==
- Sun Ra – piano (tracks 1–7), organ (tracks 8 & 9)
- Akh Tal Ebah – trumpet (tracks 1–7), flugelhorn (track 8)
- Marshall Allen – alto saxophone, flute, oboe (tracks 1–7)
- Danny Davis – alto saxophone, flute (tracks 1–7)
- John Gilmore – tenor saxophone, percussion (tracks 1–7 & 9)
- James Jacson – flute, bassoon (tracks 1–7)
- Eloe Omoe – bass clarinet, flute (tracks 1–7)
- Ronnie Boykins (tracks 8 & 9), Richard Williams (tracks 1–7) – bass
- Luqman Ali – drums (tracks 1–7)
- Atakatune – congas (tracks 1–7)
