= Sunrise in Different Dimensions =

Live album by Sun Ra Arkestra
- Released: 1981
- Recorded: February 24, 1980
- Venue: Gasthof Morhen, Willisau, Switzerland
- Genre: Jazz
- Length: 87:13
- Label: hat Hut hat Hut SEVENTEEN (2R17)
- Producer: Werner X. Uehlinger

Sun Ra chronology
I, Pharaoh (1979)	Sunrise in Different Dimensions (1981)	Voice of the Eternal Tomorrow (1980)

Sunrise in Different Dimensions is a 1980 live jazz album by the Sun Ra Arkestra, documenting a concert at the Gasthof Morhen in Willisau, Switzerland, from February 24, 1980, which was released on the hat Hut label. The album intermingles a variety of Sun Ra originals with covers of jazz standards.

== Critical response ==
Critical response to the album has been largely positive, with some dissent. In a 1983 album review, The Boston Globe described it as a "tour de force," "one of Sun Ra's best." Scott Yanow, in his AllMusic review, characterized it as "one of the better examples of [Sun Ra's] late-period band." Ajay Heble, author of Landing on the Wrong Note: Jazz, Dissonance, and Critical Practice, indicates that the album "does seem to me to do justice to the energy of Ra's performances." The album is featured in the 2000 book The Essential Jazz Records: Modernism to Postmodernism, where contributor Eric Thacker indicates that it is the cover songs that establish the record's "value as a breathless and windswept view astern from a supersonic jazz roadster's dickey-seat." Fred Kaplan, in Slate, described Sun Ra's arrangements here of Duke Ellington, Coleman Hawkins, and Jelly Roll Morton as "inspired." However, critic Stanley Crouch finds the band in this performance "woefully out of tune and botching the leader's arrangements."

Professional ratings
Review scores
Source	Rating
AllMusic	4.5/5 stars
The Penguin Guide to Jazz Recordings	2.5/4 stars
The Rolling Stone Jazz Record Guide	4/5 stars

== Music ==
Jazz critic Scott Yanow describes the Sun Ra originals here as "diverse and generally adventurous," while describing the ensemble covers as "ragged and eccentric." Among the songs singled out from the track list for special examination in Landing on the Wrong Note are "Light from a Hidden Sun" and "Big John's Special." Heble points out the alterations Sun Ra makes to the latter, which expand the big band sound, and suggests that Sun Ra's homage to the jazz composer Horace Henderson is part of Sun Ra's attempt to "reclaim" the "misrepresented history" of swing music, which had become associated with white musicians following the popularity of Benny Goodman. He draws attention to the Sun Ra piano solo "Light from a Hidden Sun" as exemplifying "the range and scope of Sun Ra's musical vision," adding that "there's beauty and elegance here, a compelling sense of swing, too, even in the freest moments."

The Essential Jazz Records describes "unevocative" and "unreflective" "Cocktails for Two" and "'Round Midnight," though it indicates that the latter is "brisk and sharp-edged," with "a strong ensemble confidence." Thacker finds "Lady Bird/Half Nelson" a unique interpretation fueled by "He-man pianistics," while both "Big John's Special" and "Yeah Man!" are nostalgic, if marked by "lightsome mockery of swing-band cliché" and irresistible "death-defying glee." He describes "Queer Notions" as "cohesive", "Limehouse Blues" as "unrepentantly skewed," "Take the "A" Train" as "an inebriated waltz" and "Lightnin'" as "full-tilt swing." Thacker also comments on the contribution by June Tyson to one of the Sun Ra originals at the end of the album: "Something that no chronicler of big-band jazz should overlook—a band vocal." "On this one," he notes, "Sun Ra, Tyson and Co. bring the solar system well within the range of the Holiday brochure: 'On Jupiter, the skies are always blue.'"

All CD editions (three, as of 2011) delete three songs from the original 2-LP set.

== Track listing ==
Except where otherwise noted, all songs were composed by Sun Ra.

1. "Light from a Hidden Sun" – 3:52
2. "Pin-Points of Spiral Prisms" – 4:41
3. "Silhouettes of the Shadow World" – 7:20
4. "Cocktails for Two" (Sam Coslow, Arthur Johnston) – 3:21
5. "'Round Midnight" (Bernie Hanighen, Thelonious Monk, Cootie Williams) – 6:39
6. "Lady Bird/Half Nelson" (Tadd Dameron, Miles Davis) – 7:58
7. "Big John's Special" (Horace Henderson) – 3:37
8. "Yeah Man!" (Fletcher Henderson, Noble Sissle) – 3:29
9. "Provocative Celestials" - 10:55 - (only on vinyl)
10. "Love in Outer Space" - 4:55 - (only on vinyl)
11. "Disguised Gods in Skullduggery Rendez Vous" – 9:05
12. "Queer Notions" (Coleman Hawkins) – 2:44
13. "Limehouse Blues" (Philip Braham, Douglas Furber) – 3:44
14. "King Porter Stomp" (Jelly Roll Morton) – 3:32
15. "Take the "A" Train" (Billy Strayhorn) – 5:07
16. "Lightin'" (Duke Ellington) – 2:43
17. "On Jupiter" – 3:35
18. "A Helio-Hello! and Goodbye Too!" – 3:12

== Personnel ==
- Marshall Allen – flute, oboe, alto saxophone
- John Gilmore – clarinet, flute, tenor saxophone
- Chris "Chubby" Henderson – drums
- Graham Lock – liner notes
- Peter Pfister – remixing, mastering
- Sun Ra – organ, piano
- Michael Ray – trumpet, flugelhorn
- Knoel Scott – flute, oboe, alto saxophone, baritone saxophone
- Danny Thompson – flute, baritone saxophone
- June Tyson – vocals
- Werner X. Uehlinger – record producer, cover photo
- Eric "Samarai Celestial" Walker – drums
- Kenneth Williams – flute, baritone saxophone, tenor saxophone
