= I, Pharaoh =

Music album

Live album by Sun Ra Arkestra
- Released: 1980
- Recorded: 1979
- Genre: Free jazz
- Length: 26:45
- Label: El Saturn; 6680

Sun Ra chronology
Strange Celestial Road (1979)	I, Pharaoh (1980)	Sunrise in Different Dimensions (1980)

I, Pharaoh is a live album by composer, bandleader and keyboardist Sun Ra and his Arkestra recorded around 1979 and released on his El Saturn label.

== Reception ==
Professional ratings
Review scores
Source	Rating
Allmusic	2.5/5 stars

The Allmusic review by Sean Westergaard states "I, Pharaoh has some fine material, but the less than perfect sound quality detracts somewhat from the experience ... pieces like this, where Ra blends history and myth, are always interesting. I, Pharaoh is a decent album, but probably not worth the prohibitive cost of most Saturn LP's to all but the most serious Sun Ra fans".

== Track listing ==
All compositions by Sun Ra

1. "Rumpelstiltskin"
2. "Images"
3. "I, Pharaoh"

== Personnel ==
- Sun Ra – piano, organ, synthesizer, recitation
- Marshall Allen – alto saxophone, flute, piccolo
- John Gilmore – tenor saxophone, percussion
- James Jacson – bassoon, flute, percussion
- Danny Ray Thompson – baritone saxophone, flute
- Eloe Omoe – bass clarinet, flute
- Steve Clarke – electric bass
- Richard Williams – bass
- Luqman Ali – drums
- Atakatune – percussion
- June Tyson – vocals
