= Mayan Temples (album) =

Studio album by Sun Ra Arkestra
- Released: 1992
- Recorded: July 24 & 25, 1990
- Genre: Jazz
- Length: 79:03
- Label: Black Saint
- Producer: Giovanni Bonandrini

Sun Ra chronology
Live in London 1990 (1990)	Mayan Temples (1992)	Pleiades (1990)

Mayan Temples is an album by the American composer, bandleader and keyboardist Sun Ra, released in 1992 on the Black Saint label. It was Sun Ra's final studio recording as a leader.

== Critical reception ==
Professional ratings
Review scores
Source	Rating
AllMusic	4.5/5 stars
The Penguin Guide to Jazz Recordings	4/4 stars

The Omaha World-Herald wrote that the album moves "through swing and be-bop band re-creations, African rhythm workouts and outer-space weirdness."

The AllMusic review by Scott Yanow stated: "One of the finest Sun Ra recordings from his final years, this effort is particularly recommended due to the many Ra keyboard solos and John Gilmore features... Overall, this is a fine all-around studio set."

== Track listing ==
All compositions by Sun Ra except as indicated

1. "Dance of the Language Barrier" – 3:58
2. "Bygone" – 5:15
3. "Disciple No. 1" – 4:57
4. "Alone Together" (Howard Dietz, Arthur Schwartz) – 7:02
5. "Prelude to Stargazers" – 5:17
6. "Mayan Temples" – 7:40
7. "I'll Never Be the Same" (Gus Kahn, Matty Malneck, Frank Signorelli) – 4:57
8. "Stardust from Tomorrow" – 3:38
9. "El Is a Sound of Joy" – 5:26
10. "Time After Time" (Sammy Cahn, Jule Styne) – 4:21
11. "Opus in Springtime" – 6:41
12. "Theme of the Stargazers" – 14:09
13. "Sunset on the Nile" – 5:42

- Recorded at Mondial Sound, Milano, Italy, on July 24 & 25, 1990.

== Personnel ==
- Sun Ra – piano, synthesizer
- Michael Ray, Ahmed Abdullah – trumpet, vocals
- Tyrone Hill – trombone
- Marshall Allen – alto saxophone, flute
- Noel Scott – alto saxophone
- John Gilmore – tenor saxophone, timbales
- James Jacson – bassoon, Ancient Egyptian Infinity Drum
- Ronald Wilson – tenor saxophone
- Carl LeBlanc – electric guitar
- Jothan Callins – bass, electric bass
- Clifford Barbaro, Earl "Buster" Smith – drums
- Ron McBee – congas, percussion
- Jorge Silva – percussion
- Elson Nascimento – surdo, percussion
- June Tyson – vocals
