= Tyler Mitchell (musician) =

American jazz musician

Tyler Mitchell (born October 7, 1958) is a jazz bassist and has recorded and toured with some of jazz's most respected artists, including: Art Taylor, Jon Hendricks, Shirley Horn, George Coleman and the Sun Ra Arkestra. He is unique in that he is active in both the traditional and avant-garde jazz idioms and is currently in demand as both a leader and a sideman in New York City. He studied the bass with Donald Raphael Garrett (John Coltrane, Archie Shepp, Roland Kirk) and Malachi Favors (Art Ensemble of Chicago). He has recorded on Grammy nominated recordings and has recorded at The Village Vanguard.

== Career ==
In 1985, after moving to New York, Tyler joined the Sun Ra Arkestra and toured extensively through Europe & Japan and recorded two albums with them.

In 1988, he joined Art Taylor in his "Taylor's Wailers", recording 2 CDs, including one live CD at the Village Vanguard.

He joined Jon Hendricks' European Tour in 1990 and recorded Freddie Freeloader on the DENON Jazz label with Stanley Turrentine, Wynton Marsalis, among others. The album was nominated for a Grammy Award that year.

In 1992, he played on Grammy Award winning jazz vocalist Shirley Horn's recording Light Out of Darkness (A Tribute to Ray Charles), which received 4/5 Stars on AllMusic.

In 1997, Mitchell continued to play with free jazz icon and Coltrane drummer Rashied Ali, Billy Bang, Jason Lindner, Frank Lowe, Larry Goldings amongst others.

He currently plays and records with his own group as a leader as well as with the Sun Ra Arkestra.

His debut CD as a leader, Tyler Mitchell – Live at Small's was released on the Small's LIVE record label in late 2012 and was an Editors' Pick in Downbeat Magazine in January 2013.

Tyler Mitchell's father, Caton Mitchell, was an acclaimed and recognized muralist and painter and was active in Chicago.

== Discography ==
=== As leader ===
- 2013 Tyler Mitchell - Live at Smalls, Smalls LIVE

=== As sideman (selected) ===
- 1987 Sun Ra - Reflections in Blue, Black Saint
- 1988 Sun Ra - Hours After, Black Saint
- 1990 Jon Hendricks - Freddie Freeloader, Denon
- 1990 Shirley Horn - Light Out of Darkness (A Tribute to Ray Charles)
- 1991 Art Taylor - Mr. A.T., Enja
- 1992 Art Taylor - Wailin' at the Vanguard, Verve
- 1989 Steve Grossman - Bouncing with Mr. A.T., Dreyfus Jazz
