= Black Myth/Out in Space =

Live album by Sun Ra and His Intergalactic Research Arkestra
- Released: 1998
- Recorded: October 17 and November 7, 1970; Donaueschingen Music Festival and Berlin Jazz Festival
- Genre: Jazz
- Length: 125:39
- Label: Motor Music; MPS 15289
- Producer: Joachim E. Berendt

Sun Ra chronology
It's After the End of the World (1970)	Black Myth/Out in Space (1998)	Live in London 1970 (1970)

Black Myth/Out in Space is a 2CD live album by American composer, bandleader and keyboardist Sun Ra recorded in 1970 in Donaueschingen and Berlin and released on the Motor Music label in 1998. Selections from the concerts were originally released in 1970 on MPS Records as It's After the End of the World but the rerelease complies both complete concerts adding more than 75 minutes of previously unissued recordings.

== Reception ==
Professional ratings
Review scores
Source	Rating
Allmusic	4/5 stars

In a review for Allmusic, Jason Ankeny states, "this two-disc set is far and away the definitive release of the material in question, compiling two 1970 festival appearances documenting Sun Ra at the peak of his considerable creative powers".

== Track listing ==
All compositions by Sun Ra

Disc One:

1. "Black Forest Myth" – 3:58
2. "Friendly Galaxy No. 2" – 5:25
3. "Journey Through the Outer Darkness" – 12:58 previously unreleased
4. "Strange Worlds/Black Myth/It's After the End of the World" – 15:18
5. "We'll Wait for You" – 10:13 previously unreleased
- Recorded at the Stadthalle as part of the Donaueschingen Musik Festival on October 17, 1970

Disc Two:

1. "Out in Space" – 37:45 previously unreleased
2. "Discipline Series" – 3:28 previously unreleased
3. "Walkin' on the Moon..." – 9:02 previously unreleased
4. "Outer Space Where I Came From" [recitation] – 0:23 previously unreleased
5. "Watusa" – 2:44
6. "Myth Versus Reality" – 14:59
7. "Theme of the Stargazers" – 0:42 previously unreleased
8. "Space Chants Medley: Second Stop Is Jupiter/Why Go to the Moon/Neptune" – 5:42 previously unreleased
9. "We Travel the Spaceways" – 3:02 previously unreleased
- Recorded at the Kongresshalle as part of the Berlin Jazz Festival on November 7, 1970.

== Personnel ==
- Sun Ra – Farfisa organ, Hohner clavinet, piano, Rocksichord, Spacemaster organ, Minimoog, Hohner electra, vocals
- Kwame Hadi – trumpet
- Akh Tal Ebah – mellophone, trumpet
- John Gilmore – tenor saxophone, percussion
- Marshall Allen – alto saxophone, flute, oboe, piccolo, percussion
- Pat Patrick – baritone saxophone, tenor saxophone, alto saxophone, clarinet, bass clarinet, flute, drum
- Danny Davis – alto saxophone, flute, clarinet
- Abshalom Ben Shlomo – alto saxophone, flute, clarinet
- Danny Ray Thompson – baritone saxophone, alto saxophone, flute
- Leroy Taylor – oboe, bass clarinet
- Robert Cummings – bass clarinet
- Augustus Browning – English horn
- Alan Silva – violin, viola, cello, bass
- Alejandro Blake Fearon – bass
- Lex Humphries – drums
- James Jackson – percussion, oboe, flute
- Nimrod Hunt – hand drums
- Hazoume – fireeater, dance, African percussion
- Math Samba, Ife Tayo – dance, percussion
- June Tyson – vocals
- Richard Wilkinson – stereo light-sound coordination
