= Purple Night =

Studio album by Sun Ra
- Released: 1990
- Recorded: November 1989
- Genre: Free jazz
- Length: 66:02
- Label: A&M
- Producer: John Snyder

Sun Ra chronology
Blue Delight (1989)	Purple Night (1990)	Mayan Temples (1990)

Professional ratings
Review scores
Source	Rating
AllMusic	3.5/5 stars
Select	4/5 medals

Purple Night is a studio album by free jazz pioneer Sun Ra. It was released in 1990 on A&M Records.

== Background ==
The album was the second in a short-term recording deal with A&M Records, as part of their "Modern Masters Jazz Series" imprint. Sun Ra's profile had risen considerably in the preceding years, partially because of the support given to him in interviews by avant-garde alternative rock band Sonic Youth, who had named him as an influence and played shows with Ra and his Arkestra.

The album was recorded in a single session at BMG Studios in New York City, using a 22-piece group that included several Arkestra members or veterans, including three drummers and two bass players (one on upright bass and another on electric bass), plus fellow free jazz musician Don Cherry, who played the pocket trumpet.

Seven tracks were used for the album, and the remainder of the master multi-track tapes were given to Sun Ra and his manager Alton Abraham for future release on their own after the A&M deal concluded. Many of these recordings were released three years later by Rounder Records on the album Somewhere Else, released shortly before Sun Ra's death. Purple Night is out of print physically, although the album is available via digital outlets. The copyright on the original album passed on to Sun Ra's estate's holding company, Sun Ra LLC, in 2016.

== Track listing ==
1. "Journey Towards Stars" – 3:44
2. "Friendly Galaxy" – 7:43
3. "Love in Outer Space" – 7:12
4. "Stars Fell On Alabama" – 10:27
5. "Of Invisible Them" – 19:08
6. "Neverness" – 13:16
7. "Purple Night Blues" – 4:02

All compositions composed by Sun Ra and published by Enterplanetary Koncepts (BMI), except "Stars Fell On Alabama" written by Mitchell Parrish and Frank Perkins and published by Mills Music Inc./Everbright Music Co. (ASCAP). All arrangements by Sun Ra.

== Musicians ==
- Sun Ra - piano, synthesiser, vocal
- Don Cherry - pocket trumpet
- June Tyson - violin, voice
- Fred Adams - trumpet
- Michael Ray - trumpet, voice
- Ahmed Abdullah - trumpet
- Al Evans - trumpet, flugelhorn
- Tyrone Hill - trombone
- Julian Priester - trombone
- Reynold Scott - baritone sax, flute
- James Spaulding - alto sax, flute
- Marshall Allen - alto sax, flute, percussion
- John Gilmore - tenor sax, percussion, voice
- James Jackson - bassoon, African drum
- Earl C. "Buster" Smith - drums
- Eric "Samarai" Walker - drums
- Thomas "Bugs" Hunter - drums (misidentified in the sleeve notes as Thomas "Bugs" Henderson)
- Elson Nascimento - surdo, percussion
- Jorge Silva - repinique, percussion
- Rollo Radford - electric bass
- John Ore - acoustic bass

== Production personnel ==
- John Snyder - producer
- Steve Ralbovsky - executive producer
