= It's After the End of the World =

Live album by Sun Ra and His Intergalactic Research Arkestra
- Released: 1970
- Recorded: 17 October and 7 November 1970; Donaueschingen Music Festival and Berlin Jazz Festival
- Genre: Jazz
- Length: 49:22
- Label: MPS; MPS 15289
- Producer: Joachim E. Berendt

Sun Ra chronology
Nuits de la Fondation Maeght (1970)	It's After the End of the World (1970)	Black Myth/Out in Space (1970)

It's After the End of the World (subtitled Live at the Donaueschingen and Berlin Festivals) is a live album by American composer, bandleader and keyboardist Sun Ra recorded in 1970 in Donaueschingen and Berlin and released on the MPS label in 1970. The complete concerts were released in 1998 as a 2-CD set entitled Black Myth/Out in Space.

== Reception ==
Professional ratings
Review scores
Source	Rating
Allmusic	3/5 stars
DownBeat	5/5 stars
The Penguin Guide to Jazz Recordings	3/4 stars

Allmusic awarded the album 3 stars. All About Jazz observed "this gem ideally captures Sun Ra and His Intergalactic (Research) Arkestra at its most otherworldly self. ...such a recording as this offers the next best thing to but a sampling of what it must have been like to experience the path that Ra offered his listeners in a live concert, perhaps the most uninhibited platform for his musical message".

== Track listing ==
All compositions by Sun Ra

1. "Strange Dreams – Strange Worlds – Black Myth / It's After the End of the World" – 14:40
2. "Black Forest Myth" – 9:15
3. "Watusi, Egyptian March" – 2:48
4. "Myth Versus Reality (The Myth-Science Approach) / Angelic Proclamation / Out in Space" – 18:22
5. "Duos" – 4:42

== Personnel ==
- Sun Ra – Farfisa organ, Hohner clavinet, piano, Rocksichord, Spacemaster organ, Minimoog, Hohner electra, vocals
- Kwame Hadi – trumpet
- Akh Tal Ebah – mellophone, trumpet
- John Gilmore – tenor saxophone, percussion
- Marshall Allen – alto saxophone, flute, oboe, piccolo, percussion
- Pat Patrick – baritone saxophone, tenor saxophone, alto saxophone, clarinet, bass clarinet, flute, drum
- Danny Davis – alto saxophone, flute, clarinet
- Abshalom Ben Shlomo – alto saxophone, flute, clarinet
- Danny Ray Thompson – baritone saxophone, alto saxophone, flute
- Leroy Taylor – oboe, bass clarinet
- Robert Cummings – bass clarinet
- Augustus Browning – Waldhorn
- Alan Silva – violin, viola, cello, bass
- Alejandro Blake Fearon – bass
- Lex Humphries – drums
- James Jackson – percussion, oboe, flute
- Nimrod Hunt – hand drums
- Hazoume – fireeater, dance, African percussion
- Math Samba, Ife Tayo – dance, percussion
- June Tyson – vocals
- Richard Wilkinson – stereo light-sound coordination
