= Nuits de la Fondation Maeght =

Nuits de la Fondation Maeght relates to the following albums recorded at Fondation Maeght and released on the French Shandar label

- Nuits de la Fondation Maeght (Albert Ayler album), released as two volumes
- Nuits de la Fondation Maeght (Sun Ra album), released as two volumes
- The Great Concert of Cecil Taylor originally released as Nuits de la Fondation Maeght 3 LP box set
