= Surrender to the Air (album) =

Studio album by Surrender to the Air
- Released: March 12, 1996
- Recorded: Spring 1995
- Genre: Free jazz
- Label: Elektra
- Producer: Trey Anastasio

Professional ratings
Review scores
Source	Rating
AllMusic	3/5 stars
Entertainment Weekly	B
MusicHound Rock: The Essential Album Guide	2/5 stars

Surrender to the Air is an album by free jazz ensemble Surrender to the Air, released in 1996.

Marshall Allen, Michael Ray, and Damon R. Choice were members of Sun Ra's Arkestra. Phish often watched Sun Ra videos on their tour bus; Jon Fishman would listen to Sun Ra interviews after Phish concerts.

Surrender to the Air marked the beginning of Trey Anastasio's solo career.

== Critical reception ==
AllMusic wrote that the album "recalls a free form, improvisation-based jazz record more than hippie rock; in that sense, it is close to the actual spirit of the Grateful Dead, if not their sound." The Tampa Bay Times called it "more like a disappointing mish-mash of instrumental indulgences than any sort of coherent musical statement." The Tulsa World called the album "hippie avant garde," writing that Anastasio "jumps feet first into an insanity of jazz."

== Track listing ==
No.	Title	Length
1.	"Intro"	1:48
2.	"And Furthermore"	7:18
3.	"We Deflate"	7:15
4.	"And Furthermore"	7:05
5.	"Down"	2:50
6.	"Intro"	2:00
7.	"And Furthermore"	4:11
8.	"And Furthermore"	11:10
9.	"Out"	5:38
Total length:		49:15

== Personnel ==
- Marshall Allen: saxophone
- Trey Anastasio: guitar
- Kofi Burbridge: flute
- Oteil Burbridge: bass guitar
- Damon R. Choice: vibraphone
- Jon Fishman: drums
- Bob Gulloti: drums
- James Harvey: trombone
- John Medeski: organ
- Michael Ray: trumpet
- Marc Ribot: guitar
