= Nuits de la Fondation Maeght (Sun Ra album) =

Live album by Sun Ra
- Released: 1971
- Recorded: August 3 & 5, 1970; Fondation Maeght in Saint-Paul-de-Vence, France
- Genre: Jazz
- Length: 39:27 (Vol. 1); 37:12 (Vol. 2)
- Label: Shandar; SR 10 001 and SR 10 003
- Producer: Claude Jauvert

Sun Ra chronology
Space Probe (1970)	Nuits de la Fondation Maeght (1971)	It's After the End of the World (1970)

Volume 2 Cover

Nuits de la Fondation Maeght is a live album by American composer, bandleader and keyboardist Sun Ra recorded in 1970 France and released in two volumes on the Shandar label.

== Reception ==
Professional ratings
Review scores
Source	Rating
Allmusic	(Vol. 1)
Allmusic	(Vol. 2)
The Penguin Guide to Jazz Recordings	3.5/4 stars

Allmusic awarded both albums 4½ stars stating "As a rule, free and avant-garde jazz are a decidedly acquired taste. However, for discerning palettes, these installments present the aggregate at their absolute pinnacle in terms of performance and inspiration" and noting the performances cover "a wide variety of styles and approaches, proving that the combo were far more multifaceted and involved than often given credit for".

== Track listing ==
All compositions by Sun Ra except as indicated

Volume 1:

1. "Enlightment" (Ra, Hobart Dotson) – 2:56
2. "The Star Gazers" – 3:08
3. "Shadow World" – 13:20
4. "The Cosmic Explorer" – 19:45

Volume 2:

1. "Friendly Galaxy Number 2" – 8:46
2. "Spontaneous Simplicity" – 10:50
3. "The World of the Lightening" – 5:54
4. "Black Myth: The Shadows Took Shape/This Strange World/Journey Through the Outer Darkness" – 8:32
5. "Sky" – 2:01

== Personnel ==
- Sun Ra – electric piano, organ, Minimoog
- Kwame Hadi – trumpet
- Akh Tal Ebah – cornet, trumpet
- John Gilmore – tenor saxophone, drum, vocals
- Marshall Allen – alto saxophone, flute, oboe, piccolo, percussion
- Pat Patrick – baritone saxophone, tenor saxophone, alto saxophone, clarinet, bass clarinet, flute, percussion
- James Jacson – clarinet, oboe, flute
- Danny Davis – alto saxophone, flute, percussion
- Abshalom Ben Shlomo – alto saxophone, flute, clarinet
- Danny Ray Thompson – baritone saxophone, alto saxophone, flute
- Alan Silva – violin, cello, bass
- Alejandro Blake Fearon – bass
- Rashid Salim IV – vibraphone, drums
- Nimrod Hunt – hand drums
- John Goldsmith – drums, tympani
- Lex Humphries – drums, percussion
- June Tyson – vocals
- Gloristeena Knight – dance, vocals
- Verta Grosvenor – space goddess, dance, vocals
