= Wailin' at the Vanguard =

Live album by Arthur Taylor's Wailers
- Released: 1993
- Recorded: August 29–30, 1992
- Venues: Village Vanguard, New York City
- Genre: Jazz
- Length: 1:01:30
- Labels: Verve; 519 677-2
- Producer: Brian Bacchus

Arthur Taylor chronology
Mr. A.T. (1992)	Wailin' at the Vanguard (1993)

Wailin' at the Vanguard is a live album by Arthur Taylor's Wailers, led by drummer Taylor, and featuring saxophonists Abraham Burton and Willie Williams, pianist Jacky Terrasson, and double bassist Tyler Mitchell. Taylor's final release as a leader, it was recorded on August 29 and 30, 1992, at the Village Vanguard in New York City, and was issued on CD in 1993 by Verve Records.

== Reception ==
Professional ratings
Review scores
Source	Rating
AllMusic	4/5 stars
MusicHound Jazz	4.5/5 stars
The Penguin Guide to Jazz	3.5/4 stars

In a review for AllMusic, Robert Taylor wrote: "Walter Bolden's compositions make for the most interesting moments here... This is excellent hard bop played by a true master, and it's a shame that 'Mr. A.T.' passed away shortly after this recording was made."

The authors of The Penguin Guide to Jazz Recordings stated: "With the demise of Art Blakey, Taylor's Wailers look set to be one of the principal training grounds for younger players... his own playing has never sounded more upfront and committed... the feel of the disc... as well as bruising interpretations of the likes of 'Dear Old Stockholm', adds a quintessential flavour."

Chris Hovan of MusicHound Jazz called the album a "charged set" featuring "some vital playing," but noted: "Unfortunately, this would be the swan song for Taylor's Wailers."

Modern Drummer's Rick Mattingly commented: "The album is no-nonsense bebop, with Taylor's depth of experience balanced by the youthful aggressiveness of his bandmembers. Above all, you can hear Taylor's energy and enthusiasm."

== Track listing ==
1. "Street Intro" – 0:14
2. "A.T.'s Shout" (Arthur Taylor) – 1:21
3. "Bridge Theme" (Walter Bolden) – 0:19
4. "Band Introductions" – 0:49
5. "Dear Old Stockholm" (Stan Getz) – 8:12
6. "Stressed Out" (Walter Bolden) – 8:12
7. "So Sorry Please" (Bud Powell) – 4:44
8. "Bridge Theme" (Walter Bolden) – 0:20
9. "Mr. A.T. Revisited" (Walter Bolden) – 8:56
10. "Interchat" – 0:36
11. "Ellington/Strayhorn Medley: Sophisticated Lady" (Duke Ellington, Irving Mills, Mitchell Parish) – 5:07
12. "Ellington/Strayhorn Medley: In A Sentimental Mood" (Duke Ellington, Manny Kurtz, Irving Mills) – 5:07
13. "Ellington/Strayhorn Medley: Chelsea Bridge" (Billy Strayhorn) – 6:14
14. "Harlem Mardi Gras" (Walter Bolden) – 10:13
15. "Bridge Theme/Salt Peanuts" (Walter Bolden/Dizzy Gillespie, Kenny Clarke) – 0:39

== Personnel ==
- Arthur Taylor – drums
- Abraham Burton – alto saxophone
- Willie Williams – tenor saxophone
- Jacky Terrasson – piano
- Tyler Mitchell – double bass
