= Pathways to Unknown Worlds =

Studio album by Sun Ra
- Released: 1975
- Recorded: 1973
- Studio: El Saturn, Chicago, Illinois
- Genre: Free jazz
- Length: 26:41
- Label: Impulse! ASD-9298
- Producer: Alton Abrahams

Sun Ra chronology
Space is the Place (1972)	Pathways to Unknown Worlds (1975)	Outer Space Employment Agency (1973)

Pathways to Unknown Worlds is an album by jazz composer, bandleader and keyboardist Sun Ra and his Arkestra recorded in Chicago in 1973 and originally released on his Saturn label and rereleased by the ABC/Impulse! label in 1975. In 2000, Evidence Music released Pathways to Unknown Worlds + Friendly Love, added an untitled track from the same sessions as well as the previously unreleased Friendly Love album.

== Reception ==
The AllMusic review by Lindsay Planer stated that "the three free jazz instrumental improvisations are in many respects quite similar to the laissez-faire sonic free for alls that had become synonymous with Ra's concurrent Arkestra(s)".

Professional ratings
Review scores
Source	Rating
AllMusic	4/5 stars

== Track listing ==
All compositions by Sun Ra

Side One:

1. "Pathways to Unknown Worlds" - 12:12

Side Two:

1. "Extension Out" - 7:31
2. "Cosmo-Media" - 6:58

== Personnel ==
- Sun Ra - keyboards
- Akh Tal Ebah, Lamont McClamb - trumpet
- Marshall Allen - alto saxophone, flute, oboe
- Danny Davis - alto saxophone
- John Gilmore - tenor saxophone, percussion
- Danny Ray Thompson - baritone saxophone
- Eloe Omoe - bass clarinet
- Ronnie Boykins, Bill Davis - bass
- Clifford Jarvis - drums
- Russell Branch - percussion
- Eugene Brennan - congas
- Stanley Morgan - percussion, congas
