= Lanquidity =

Studio album by Sun Ra
- Released: 14 August 1978
- Recorded: 17 July 1978
- Studio: Blank Tapes, New York City
- Genre: Jazz fusion; avant-garde jazz
- Length: 43:33 (original LP); 91:20 (special edition)
- Label: Philly Jazz
- Producer: Sun Ra

Sun Ra chronology
Visions (1978)	Lanquidity (1978)	Sound Mirror (1978)

Lanquidity is a 1978 studio album by American jazz musician Sun Ra.

== Music ==
The album was recorded by Bob Blank and Joe Arlotta at Blank Studios, entirely on the night of July 17, 1978. Stylistically, the album is markedly different from Sun Ra's earlier recordings, drawing heavily on funk, R&B and jazz fusion. Lanquidity is also unusual in featuring two guitarists, which were seldom used in the Arkestra.

== Critical reception ==
Professional ratings
Review scores
Source	Rating
All About Jazz	favorable
AllMusic	4.5/5 stars
Alternative Press	4/5 stars
JazzTimes	favorable
The Penguin Guide to Jazz Recordings	3/4 stars
The Rolling Stone Jazz Record Guide	3/5 stars
Spin	favorable
DownBeat	4.5/5 stars

Spin magazine called Lanquidity "a beautiful place to enter Ra's psych-jazz omniverse", while Alternative Press wrote that it is "impossibly funky": "Often compared to Miles Davis' heaviest jazz-rock-funk fusion, Lanquidity is dense, rhythmic and curiously hypnotic". Music journalist Robert Christgau is a fan of the album.

DownBeat gave the album 4.5 stars. Reviewer Larry Birnbaum wrote, "Ra’s genius for orchestration has never been more sumptuously manifest, as he floats deep bottomy vamps over a slow-motion backbeat from a disco party on Atlantis. The frenzied wailing of past Ra incarnations has given way to nostalgic reverie, updated with funky rhythms and Ra's consistently outside sensibility".

== Reissues ==
The album was first released in 1978 with a reflective foil silver cover. In 2000, it was reissued on HDCD by Evidence Records, with a light grey cover.

In 2021, Strut announced a reissue of the album. Four editions were made available: a remastered version of the original album on digital and as a single LP, and a "Special Edition" version as a 2xCD and 4xLP box set, including rare alternate mixes by Bob Blank. In addition, record club Vinyl Me, Please, pressed a limited run of 750 copies of the single-LP version on red vinyl.

== Track listing ==
All tracks are written by Sun Ra.

Original LP
No.	Title	Length
1.	"Lanquidity"	8:19
2.	"Where Pathways Meet"	6:30
3.	"That's How I Feel"	8:09

No.	Title	Length
1.	"Twin Stars of Thence"	9:30
2.	"There Are Other Worlds (They Have Not Told You Of)"	10:58
Total length:		43:33

The 2021 "Special Edition" contains the above tracks, followed by Bob Blank's alternate mixes (with the same sequencing) for a total of ten songs.

== Personnel ==
- Sun Ra: organ, synthesizer, piano, arranger, keyboards, Hammond organ, electric piano, vocals, bells, Arp, Fender Rhodes, orchestra bells, Mini Moog
- John Gilmore: tenor saxophone
- Danny Ray Thompson: flute, baritone saxophone
- Eddie Gale: trumpet
- Michael Ray: trumpet, flugelhorn
- Marshall Allen: flute, oboe, alto saxophone
- Luqman Ali: percussion
- Michael Anderson: percussion
- Artaukatune: drums, tympani
- Disco Kid: ( Slo Johnson ) guitar
- Dale Williams: guitar
- Atakatun Odun: congas
- Elo Omoe: Flute, bass clarinet
- Julian Pressley: baritone saxophone
- Richard Williams: bass
- James Jacson: oboe, basson, flute, voices
- June Tyson: voices
