= Blue Delight =

Studio album by Sun Ra
- Released: 1989
- Recorded: December 5, 1988
- Genre: Free jazz
- Length: 65:51
- Label: A&M
- Producer: John Snyder

Sun Ra chronology
Somewhere Else (1989)	Blue Delight (1989)	Purple Night (1990)

Blue Delight is a jazz album by free jazz pioneer Sun Ra.

The album was the first in a short-term recording deal with major label A&M Records on their "Modern Masters Jazz Series" imprint.

The album was recorded at Variety Recording Studios, New York on December 5, 1988 featuring a 19-piece group that included several Arkestra members or veterans.

Eight tracks were used for the Blue Delight album. Other recordings from this session were released three years later by Rounder Records on the album Somewhere Else, released shortly before Sun Ra's death. The Blue Delight album is available on iTunes and other digital outlets, and the copyright on the original album was passed on by A&M's current owner, Universal Music, to Sun Ra’s estate’s holding company, Sun Ra LLC, in 2016.

== Reception ==
The AllMusic review by Sean Westergaard stated, "Blue Delight is a great late-period Arkestra recording, notable for several reasons: 1. This is a very large, impeccably recorded Arkestra featuring special guests Tommy Turrentine and Don Cherry AND a number of Arkestra alumni returning for the date. 2. Although synthesizers are present, the majority of Ra's solos are on piano. 3. John Gilmore solos on nearly every cut. 4. The band swings mightily from start to finish. Blue Delight also features a program of a handful of standards mixed with Ra originals that don't head too far into outer space. Although this recording is out of print, it is well-worth seeking out."

Professional ratings
Review scores
Source	Rating
AllMusic	4.5/5 stars

== Track listing ==
1. "Blue Delight" - 11:10
2. "Out of Nowhere" (Green, Heyman) - 5:26
3. "Sunrise" - 11:48
4. "They Dwell on Other Planes" - 14:41
5. "Gone with the Wind" (Magison, Wrubel) - 5:51
6. "Your Guest Is as Good as Mine" - 5:53
7. "Nashira" (Priester) - 4:09
8. "Days of Wine and Roses" (Mancini) - 6:58

All compositions by Sun Ra except as indicated. All arrangements by Sun Ra.
Recorded at Variety Recording Studios, New York, on December 5, 1988.

== Personnel ==
- Sun Ra - piano, synthesizer
- Fred Adams - trumpet
- Tommy Turrentine - trumpet
- Ahmed Abdullah - trumpet
- Al Evans - flugelhorn
- Tyrone Hill - trombone
- Julian Priester - trombone
- Marshall Allen - alto saxophone, flute, oboe, clarinet
- Noel Scott - alto saxophone, percussion
- John Gilmore - tenor saxophone, clarinet, percussion
- Danny Ray Thompson - baritone saxophone, flute, bongos
- Eloe Omoe - bass clarinet, alto saxophone, contra-alto clarinet, percussion
- James Jacson - bassoon, flute, percussion
- Bruce Edwards - electric guitar
- Carl LeBlanc - electric guitar (all solos)
- John Ore - bass
- Billy Higgins - drums
- Earl "Buster" Smith - drums
- Elson Nascimento - percussion
