= Space Is the Place (Sun Ra album) =

Space Is The Place

Studio album by Sun Ra
- Released: 1973
- Recorded: October 19–20, 1972
- Studio: Streeterville, Chicago, Illinois, U.S.
- Genre: Avant-garde jazz
- Length: 42:51
- Label: Blue Thumb
- Producer: Alton Abraham; Ed Michel

Sun Ra chronology
Live in Egypt (1971)	Space Is The Place (1973)	Pathways to Unknown Worlds (1973)

Space Is the Place is a studio album by Sun Ra. It was originally released on the Blue Thumb label in 1973. In 1998, it was reissued by Impulse! Records.

== Critical reception ==
Professional ratings
Review scores
Source	Rating
AllMusic	5/5 stars
The Penguin Guide to Jazz Recordings	3.5/4 stars

Stephen Cook of AllMusic commented that "Space Is the Place provides an excellent introduction to Sun Ra's vast and free-form jazz catalog." He called it "a fine recording and a must for Sun Ra fans." Stevie Chick of BBC described the album's title track as "Sun Ra's ultimate anthem, espousing the fusion of science fiction and ancient myth with the panoply of jazz that would seduce Sun Ra fans on rock's innovative vanguard, the likes of the MC5, Sonic Youth and Primal Scream."

== Track listing ==
All tracks are written by Sun Ra.

No.	Title	Length
1.	"Space Is the Place"	21:14
2.	"Images"	6:15
3.	"Discipline 33"	4:50
4.	"Sea of Sound"	7:42
5.	"Rocket Number Nine"	2:50
Total length:		42:51

== Personnel ==
Credits adapted from liner notes.

Sun Ra and His Astro Intergalactic Infinity Arkestra

- Sun Ra – Farfisa organ (1, 3, 4, 5), piano (2), arrangement
- Akh Tal Ebah – vocals (1), trumpet (2), flugelhorn (4)
- Kwame Hadi (Lamont McClamb) – trumpet (2, 4)
- Marshall Allen – flute (3), alto saxophone (4)
- Danny Davis – flute (3), alto saxophone (4)
- John Gilmore – vocals (1, 5), tenor saxophone (2, 3, 4)
- Danny Thompson – baritone saxophone (1), flute (3), vocals (5)
- Eloe Omoe – bass clarinet (1, 5), flute (3)
- Pat Patrick – bass guitar (1, 2), baritone saxophone (4), vocals (5)
- Lex Humphries – drums (4)
- Atakatun (Stanley Morgan) – percussion (4)
- Odun (Russel Branch) – percussion (4)

Space Ethnic Voices

- June Tyson – vocals (1, 5)
- Ruth Wright – vocals (1, 5)
- Cheryl Banks – vocals (1, 5)
- Judith Holton – vocals (1, 5)

Technical

- Alton Abraham – production
- Ed Michel – production
- Baker Bigsby – engineering
- Steve Skinder – engineering assistance
- Jim Dolan – engineering assistance
- Mitch Hennes – engineering assistance
- Preston Wakeland – engineering assistance
- Dominic Lumetta – engineering assistance
- Jim Newman – photography (Impulse! Records edition)
- Chuck Stewart – photography (Impulse! Records edition)
- Hollis King – art direction (Impulse! Records edition)
- Señora Brown – graphic design (Impulse! Records edition)
