= Mr. A.T. =

Studio album by Arthur Taylor and Taylor's Wailers
- Released: 1992
- Recorded: December 9, 1991
- Studio: Van Gelder Studio, Englewood Cliffs, New Jersey
- Genre: Jazz
- Length: 55:34
- Label: Enja; 7017 2
- Producer: Matthias Winckelmann

Arthur Taylor chronology
A.T.'s Delight (1960)	Mr. A.T. (1992)	Wailin' at the Vanguard (1993)

Mr. A.T. is an album by drummer Arthur Taylor and his band Taylor's Wailers. It was recorded on December 9, 1991, at Van Gelder Studio in Englewood Cliffs, New Jersey, and was released on CD in 1992 by Enja Records. On the album, Taylor is joined by saxophonists Abraham Burton and Willie Williams, pianist Marc Cary, and double bassist Tyler Mitchell.

== Reception ==
Professional ratings
Review scores
Source	Rating
AllMusic	4.5/5 stars
MusicHound Jazz	5/5 stars
The Penguin Guide to Jazz	3/4 stars

In an article for The New York Times, Peter Watrous wrote: "One of the best groups in jazz, led by one of the jazz's best drummers and arrangers, has produced an explosive and intelligent piece of work."

Scott Yanow of AllMusic noted that Taylor "re-emerged as an important bandleader with this Enja CD," and stated: "On a variety of tunes from the 1950s and '60s... the musicians play some high-quality modern hard bop. Enjoyable music."

The authors of The Penguin Guide to Jazz Recordings commented: "With the demise of Art Blakey, Taylor's Wailers look set to be one of the principal training grounds for younger players... his own playing has never sounded more upfront and committed... Williams and Abrahams... are big, burly players and, though Taylor still has an aristocrat's touch, he kicks the group along with real gusto, even if the music is formulaic."

The editors of MusicHound Jazz awarded the album a full five stars, and reviewer Chris Hovan remarked: "Walter Bolden's choice compositions and a fiery band... all help make this Taylor's greatest record of his career."

== Track listing ==
1. "Mr. A.T." (Walter Bolden) – 11:57
2. "Hi-Fly" (Randy Weston) – 7:01
3. "Soul Eyes" (Mal Waldron) – 14:16
4. "Bullet Train" (Walter Bolden) – 5:57
5. "It Doesn't Matter" (Arthur Taylor) – 2:07
6. "Ahmad's Blues" (Ahmad Jamal) – 7:04
7. "Gingerbread Boy" (Jimmy Heath) – 3:36
8. "Mr A.T." (Walter Bolden) – 3:24

== Personnel ==
- Arthur Taylor – drums
- Abraham Burton – alto saxophone
- Willie Williams – tenor saxophone
- Marc Cary – piano
- Tyler Mitchell – double bass
