= Abraham Burton =

American saxophonist and bandleader (born 1971)

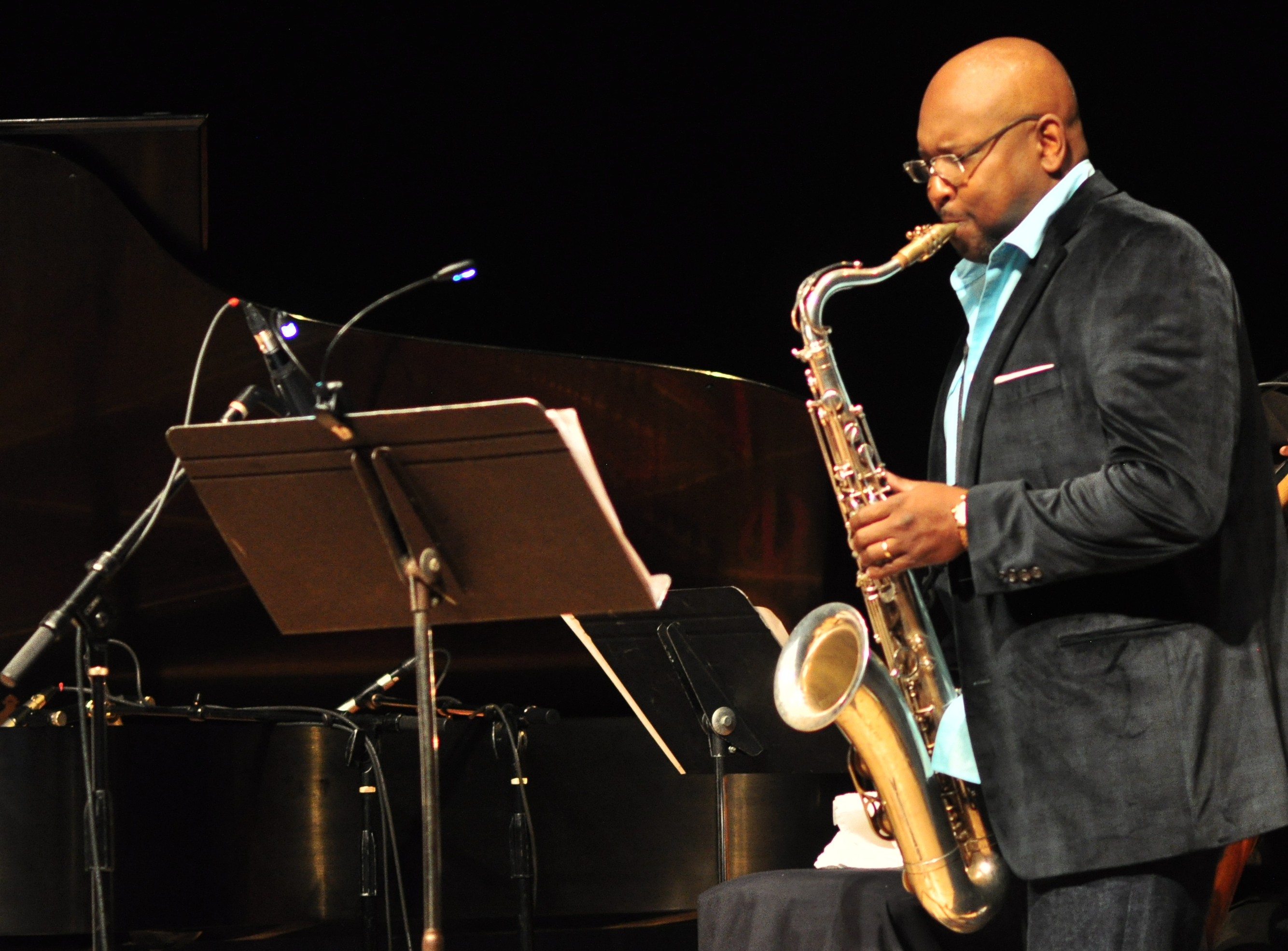

Abraham Augustus Burton Jr. (born March 17, 1971) is an American saxophonist and bandleader.

== Biography ==
Burton was born in New York City on March 17, 1971, and was raised in Greenwich Village. He studied at the Hartt School from 1989 to 1993, graduating in music. His teachers there included Michael Carvin and Jackie McLean. During the early 1990s he played with Nat Reeves' band, and from 1991 to 1995 he performed with Art Taylor's Wailers.

In 1994, Burton formed his own band, known later as Forbidden Fruit, whose members at various times included pianists Marc Cary, Allan Palmer, and James Hurt, the double bass players Billy Johnson and Yosuke Inoue, and the drummer Eric McPherson. With that band he toured internationally and recorded several albums. His first recording as a leader was Closest to the Sun, which was released by Enja Records in 1994. This was followed around two years later by The Magician, also for Enja. In the late 1990s, he also performed in ensembles led by Louis Hayes, Ali Jackson, and Santi DeBriano. For Cause and Effect, released by Enja in 2000, Burton switched from alto to tenor saxophone.

Burton is a faculty member at the Hartt School.

== Playing style ==
Grove wrote: "Burton's most obvious influence is his mentor McLean, but elements drawn from the style of John Coltrane are also evident. His recordings reveal him to be a highly capable ballad player; on fast pieces he performs with an inspired level of controlled abandon."

== Discography ==
=== As leader/co-leader ===
- Closest to the Sun (Enja, 1994)
- The Magician (Enja, 1995)
- Cause and Effect (Enja, 2000)
- Future (self-released, 2011)
- Live from Summit Rock in Seneca Village (Giant Step Arts, 2022)

=== As sideman ===
With Lucian Ban

- Mystery (Sunnyside, 2013)
- Songs from Afar (Sunnyside, 2016)

With Louis Hayes

- Quintessential Lou (TCB, 1999)
- The Candy Man (TCB, 2001)
- The Time Keeper (18th & Vine, 2009)
- Return of the Jazz Communicators (Smoke Sessions, 2014)
- Serenade for Horace (Blue Note, 2017)
- Crisis (Savant, 2021)
- Exactly Right! (Savant, 2023)
- Artform Revisited (Savant, 2024)

With Mingus Big Band

- I Am Three (Sunnyside, 2005)
- Live in Tokyo (Sunnyside, 2006)
- Mingus Big Band Live at Jazz Standard (2010)
- Mingus Sings (Sunnyside, 2015)

With Art Taylor

- Mr. A.T. (Enja, 1992)
- Wailin' at the Vanguard (Verve, 1993)

With Jack Walrath

- Heavy Mirth (SteepleChase, 2010)
- Forsooth! (SteepleChase, 2011)
- To Hellas and Back (SteepleChase, 2013)
- Unsafe at Any Speed (SteepleChase, 2015)

With others

- Steve Davis, For Real (Posi-Tone, 2014)
- Santi Debriano, Artistic License (Savant, 2001)
- Duane Eubanks, Things of That Particular Nature (Sunnyside, 2015)
- Dusko Goykovich, Bebop City (Enja, 1995)
- Ali Jackson, Groove@Jazz En Tete (Space Time, 2000)
- Jimmy Smith, Damn! (Verve, 1995)
- Horace Tapscott, Aiee! The Phantom (Arabesque, 1996)
