= Philly Jazz =

- Status: Inactive
- Genre: Jazz
- Country of origin: U.S.
- Location: Philadelphia, Pennsylvania

Philly Jazz was a small jazz record label in Philadelphia, Pennsylvania.

Sunny Murray's Apple Cores features Cecil McBee on bass, Frank Foster on soprano saxophone, pianist Don Pullen and guitarist Monnette Sudler. Hamiet Bluiett, Fred Hopkins, Arthur Blythe, and Oliver Lake also each appear on one track each.

Sun Ra released two albums on the label, Lanquidity (1978) and Of Mythic Worlds 1979. Byard Lancaster's Exodus and Khan Jamal's The River are both highly sought after.

== Discography ==
Cat. #PJ	Album	Artist
1	Exodus	Byard Lancaster
666	Lanquidity	Sun Ra
1002	The River	Khan Jamal & Bill Lewis
1004	Apple Cores	Sunny Murray
1007	Of Mythic Worlds	Sun Ra
