= Surrender to the Air =

American jazz ensemble

- Surrender to the Air in 1996

Background information
- Origin: Burlington, Vermont, USA
- Genres: Free jazz
- Years active: 1996
- Label: Elektra
- Past members: Trey Anastasio; Marshall Allen; Damon R. Choice; Marc Ribot; John Medeski; Michael Ray; James Harvey; Jon Fishman; Oteil Burbridge; Kofi Burbridge; Bob Gullotti

Surrender to the Air was a free jazz ensemble led by Trey Anastasio of Phish that included Marshall Allen, Damon Choice, and Michael Ray of the Sun Ra Orchestra, John Medeski, Marc Ribot, Oteil Burbridge, Jon Fishman, and several other musicians.

The group performed two concerts at the Academy of Music In New York City in April 1996 and disbanded shortly thereafter. The concerts, like the group's sole album, consisted of completely improvised music.

Around the time of the group's formation, Anastasio mentioned in interviews that he based the ensemble around Sun Ra's free jazz ensembles of the mid-twentieth century. "A lot of times, I think he was the pinnacle," said Anastasio. "He was as good as it got. His values remained pure for his entire life, and there's something to be said for that."

== Discography ==
- Surrender to the Air (1996)
