= Somewhere Else (Sun Ra album) =

Studio album by Sun Ra
- Released: 1993
- Recorded: December 1988 and November 1989
- Genre: Free jazz
- Length: 61:14
- Label: Rounder
- Producer: John Snyder

Sun Ra chronology
Cosmo Omnibus Imagiable Illusion (1988)	Somewhere Else (1993)	Blue Delight (1989)

Somewhere Else is the final studio album by free jazz composer, bandleader and keyboardist Sun Ra released on the Rounder label. The album consists of tracks recorded in late 1989, at the same sessions which produced the albums Blue Delight and Purple Night, but it was not released until shortly before Sun Ra's death, over three years later.

== Reception ==
The Allmusic review by Scott Yanow awarded the album 4 stars stating "Due to the variety and very interesting personnel, plus many examples of the keyboardist/leader stretching himself, this somewhat obscure effort is easily recommended to Sun Ra collectors".

Professional ratings
Review scores
Source	Rating
Allmusic	4/5 stars

== Track listing ==
All compositions by Sun Ra except as indicated. All arrangements by Sun Ra.

1. "Priest" – 4:01
2. "Discipline/Tall Trees in the Sun" – 8:26
3. "'S Wonderful" (George Gershwin, Ira Gershwin) – 5:32
4. "Hole in the Sky" – 7:31
5. "Somewhere Else Part 1" – 8:38
6. "Somewhere Else Part 2" – 2:41
7. "Stardust for Tomorrow" – 4:56
8. "Love in Outer Space" – 12:01
9. "Everything Is Space" – 3:57
10. "Tristar" – 3:31

Recorded at Variety Recording Studios in New York in December 1988 (tracks 1 & 8–10) and at BMG Studios in New York City in November 1989 (tracks 2–7)

== Personnel ==
- Sun Ra – piano, synthesizer
- Don Cherry – pocket trumpet
- Fred Adams, Michael Ray, Ahmed Abdullah, Jothan Callins, Al Evans – trumpet
- Tyrone Hill, Julian Priester – trombone
- Reynold Scott – baritone saxophone, flute
- James Spaulding – alto saxophone, flute
- Marshall Allen – alto saxophone, flute, percussion
- John Gilmore – tenor saxophone, percussion
- James Jacson – bassoon, Ancient Egyptian Infinity Drum
- Rollo Radford – electric bass
- John Ore, Jaribu Shahid – bass
- June Tyson – vocals, violin
- Billy Higgins, Thomas "Bugs" Hunter, Earl "Buster" Smith, Eric "Samurai" Walker – drums
- Elson Nascimento – surdo, percussion
- Jorge Silva – repinique, percussion
- Carl LeBlanc – Soloist, Guitar
