= I'll Get By (As Long as I Have You) =

1928 popular song

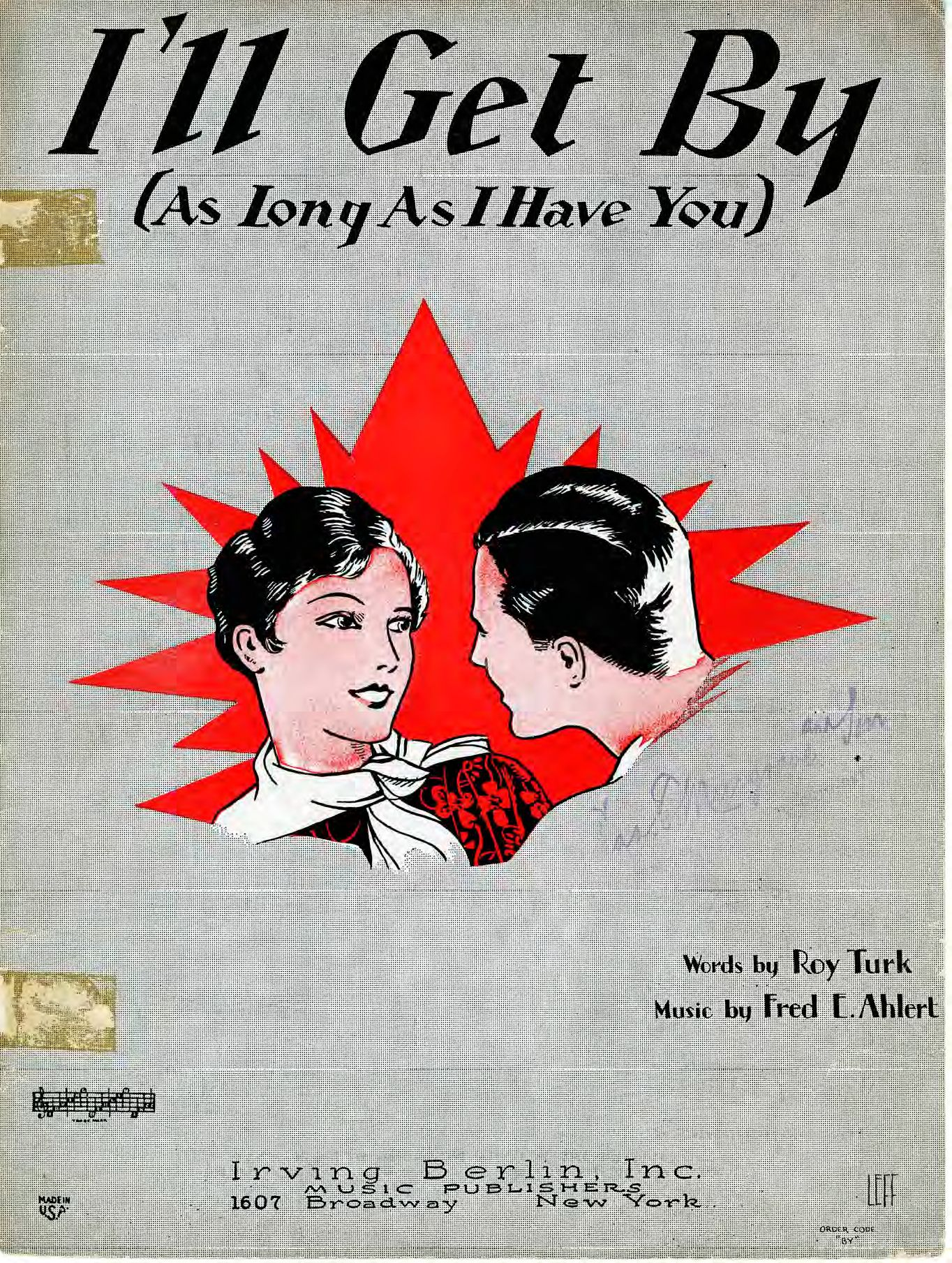
1928 sheet music cover, illustration by Sydney Leff

"I'll Get By (as Long as I Have You)" is a popular song with music by Fred E. Ahlert and lyrics by Roy Turk that was published in 1928. Versions by Nick Lucas, Aileen Stanley and, most successfully, Ruth Etting, all charted in America in 1929.

== 1944 recordings ==
- In 1944 the song achieved its biggest success with a version by Harry James and His Orchestra featuring vocalist Dick Haymes – an April 1941 recording re-released owing to a stipulation by the 1942–44 musicians' strike that prevented recording of new material. The single debuted in April 1944 on Billboard's National Best Selling Retail Records chart and reached number one in the chart dated June 10, 1944 – the seventh of Harry James's nine US number ones; it stayed at number one for four non-consecutive weeks. The single topped Billboard's Most Played Juke Box Records chart for six weeks.
- A recording by The Ink Spots featuring tenor Bill Kenny also reached Billboard's Top Ten in 1944. A version by the King Sisters peaked at no. 12. The song featured in the Variety chart 10 Best Sellers on Coin-Machines in the week dated June 21, 1944. The song was also placed in the year-end 1944 Top Ten of Lucky Strike's Your hit Parade. "I'll Get By" ranked third in a 1944 Billboard poll of the best-selling sheet music among GIs stationed in training camps and in Europe.

== Other notable recordings ==
- 1928 The Ipana Troubadors (vocal by Bing Crosby), recorded December 28, 1928 for Columbia Records.
- 1928 Ben Bernie and His Orchestra, recorded December 20, 1928 for Brunswick Records.
- 1937 Billie Holiday (with Teddy Wilson and His Orchestra), recorded May 11, 1937 for Columbia Records (Catalog No, 35926).
- 1947 Buddy Clark, recorded August 20, 1947 for Columbia Records (Catalog No. 37910).
- 1956 The Platters, included on the 1956 LP The Platters – Volume Two, and on EP releases including France.
- 1958 Connie Francis's cover was included on her 1958 debut album, Who's Sorry Now, and reached No. 19 in the UK singles chart in November of that year.
- 1958 Jerry Vale, included on his album I Remember Buddy.
- 1958 Billy Williams's, recording peaked at no. 87 on the Hot 100.
- 1958 Keely Smith, included on her album Politely!.
- 1960 Frankie Laine, included on his album You Are My Love.
- 1960 Coleman Hawkins, covered it on his album At Ease with Coleman Hawkins.
- 1961 Shirley Bassey, whose cover peaked at no. 10 in the UK singles chart in December 1961/January 1962.
- 1962 Brook Benton, included on his album There Goes That Song Again.
- 1962 Johnnie Ray, included on the album Johnnie Ray.
- 1963 Peggy Lee, included on the album I'm a Woman.
- 1965 Jack Jones, included on the album Dear Heart.
- 1965 Al Hirt, included on the album They're Playing Our Song.
- 1973 Sun Ra (also 1977), released as bonus tracks on his posthumous 1977 album Some Blues But Not the Kind That's Blue.
- 1988 Michael Feinstein - included on his album Isn't It Romantic.
- 1992 Mickey Rooney - included on his novelty album Go Ahead and Laff

== Film versions ==
- 1943 A Guy Named Joe, as sung by Irene Dunne.
- 1944 Follow the Boys, as sung by Dinah Shore.
- 1948 You Were Meant for Me
- 1950 I'll Get By, as sung by June Haver.
- 1954 A Star Is Born, as sung by Judy Garland in the "Born in a Trunk" sequence.
- 1973 Birds of Prey – a TV movie starring David Janssen as an aging helicopter pilot chasing airborne criminals. The song, sung by an unknown artist in slow Big-Band fashion, serves to frame the character's reminiscences of his glory days as a World War II aviator. CBS later removed the song in DVD reincarnations of the film due to issues of royalty payments, in the same manner they later replaced John Denver's "Looking for Space" in episodes of Magnum, P.I. and The Moody Blues' "Nights in White Satin" in the Season One finale of Wiseguy.
- 1983 Zelig. The 1928 recording by Ben Bernie and His Hotel Roosevelt Orchestra (vocal by Eddy Thomas) features in Woody Allen's satirical film.

Note: A frequent claim that Billie Holiday's version of "I’ll Get By" was used for the 1973 TV movie Birds of Prey is unverifiable. Comparisons of the movie soundtrack vs. Holiday's surviving recordings show that the vocals and orchestrations do not match. The film's singer, still unknown and uncredited, had a much deeper voice than Holiday, and the orchestra and arrangement were noticeably more modern than any of Holiday's recordings. Readers can verify this by playing the URL recording of the original movie version (posted to one of the IMDb reviews of the movie), then listening to any of Holiday's recordings on the Apple ITunes Store, which are noticeably different in all respects. It is very unlikely a Holiday version was used.

== In popular culture ==
This song was interpreted by Marilyn Monroe during one of her lessons in the Actors Studio. According to some, Monroe's performance caused a member of the audience to cry, which convinced some observers of her acting ability.

This song is not to be confused with "I'll Get By", the 1991 hit ballad by Eddie Money.
