= Abshalom Ben Shlomo =

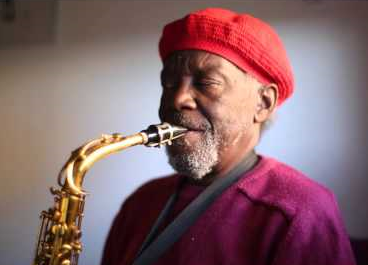

Background information
- Birth name: Virgil C. Pumphrey
- Also known as: Absholom ben Shlomo, Abshlom ben Shlomo
- Born: November 11, 1943 (age 81); Chicago, Illinois
- Origin: Chicago, Illinois
- Genres: Jazz, Free jazz, Avant-garde jazz, Experimental jazz
- Occupation: musician
- Instruments: Alto saxophone, clarinet, flute
- Years active: 1966–present
- Labels: Shandar, MPS Records, Transparency

Abshalom ben Shlomo ( November 11, 1943 - July 16, 2024) was an Israeli-American jazz saxophonist. Ben Shlomo is best known for working under the iconic jazz keyboardist and bandleader Sun Ra throughout the 1970s.

== Background ==
Abshalom ben Shlomo was born Virgil C. Pumphrey on November 11, 1943, in Chicago, Illinois. Ben Shlomo's first major exposure to the world of jazz came through the AACM, the esteemed Chicago arts institution. Earlier he had studied mainly under Chicago tenor sax great Joe Daley. Under his birth name Virgil Pumphrey, ben Shlomo had come to be viewed, along with a select group of musicians, as a key "first wave" participant in the AACM.

== Sun Ra Arkestra & Beyond ==
Ben Shlomo first met Sun Ra by chance in Chicago as a teenager around 1960, becoming a Creative Tone Scientist with the Arkestra beginning in 1970. His most notable recordings with Sun Ra & the Arkestra include the more avant-garde "Black Myth/Out in Space" LP, and performances such as the Nuits de la Fondation Maeght shows from 1970 which were released in 1971 on the French avant-garde jazz label Shandar.

In addition to saxophones, ben Shlomo plays clarinet, flute and percussion. Among countless luminaries of the jazz world, ben Shlomo has collaborated with free jazz giants Pharoah Sanders and Anthony Braxton, as well as Henry Threadgill, a longtime friend from the early days of the AACM.

Ben Shlomo relocated to Arad, Israel in the mid-1970s. He maintains strong ties to the local Hebrew-Yisraelite community there.

== Current ==
Ben Shlomo has lived and evolved his Tone Science in Israel for over 40 years now. The Abshalom Ben Shlomo Ethnic Experience, his main ensemble, performs regularly.

In 2014, ben Shlomo was featured in the Sun Ra "Centennial Dream" Arkestra under the direction of Marshall Allen.
