= Hours After =

Studio album by Sun Ra Arkestra
- Released: 1989
- Recorded: December 18 & 19, 1986
- Genre: Jazz
- Length: 43:05
- Label: Black Saint
- Producer: Giovanni Bonandrini

Sun Ra chronology
Reflections in Blue (1986)	Hours After (1989)	Cosmo Omnibus Imagiable Illusion (1988)

Hours After is an album by American composer, bandleader and keyboardist Sun Ra, recorded in 1986 in Italy and released on the Black Saint label in 1989. The album was recorded at the same sessions that produced Reflections in Blue, which was released in 1987.

== Reception ==
The AllMusic review by Scott Yanow stated, "On this continually interesting program, Sun Ra and his Arkestra perform typically odd versions of a couple of standards, a swinging original, and two outside pieces. Almost up to the level of Reflections In Blue (recorded during the same two-day period), this date features one of the stronger versions of Ra's band... Recommended."

Professional ratings
Review scores
Source	Rating
AllMusic	4/5 stars
The Penguin Guide to Jazz Recordings	3.5/4 stars

== Track listing ==
All compositions by Sun Ra except as indicated

1. "But Not for Me" (George Gershwin, Ira Gershwin) – 5:58
2. "Hours After" – 8:42
3. "Beautiful Love" (Haven Gillespie, Wayne King, Egbert Van Alstyne, Victor Young) – 4:59
4. "Dance of the Extra Terrestrians" – 13:21
5. "Love on a Far Away Planet" – 10:05

- Recorded at Jingle Machine Studio, Milano, on December 18 and 19, 1986.

== Personnel ==
- Sun Ra – piano, synthesizer, vocals
- Randall Murray – trumpet
- Tyrone Hill – trombone
- Pat Patrick – alto saxophone, clarinet
- Marshall Allen – alto saxophone, flute, piccolo, oboe
- Danny Ray Thompson – alto saxophone, baritone saxophone, flute, bongos
- John Gilmore – tenor saxophone, clarinet, timbales
- Eloe Omoe – alto saxophone, alto clarinet, bass clarinet
- James Jacson – bassoon, Ancient Egyptian Infinity Drum
- Ronald Wilson – tenor saxophone
- Carl LeBlanc – electric guitar
- Tyler Mitchell – bass
- Thomas Hunter, Earl "Buster" Smith – drums
