= Reflections in Blue (Sun Ra album) =

Studio album by Sun Ra Arkestra
- Released: 1987
- Recorded: December 18 & 19, 1986
- Genre: Jazz
- Length: 39:36
- Label: Black Saint
- Producer: Giovanni Bonandrini

Sun Ra chronology
A Night In East Berlin (1986)	Reflections in Blue (1987)	Hours After (1986)

Reflections in Blue is an album by American composer, bandleader and keyboardist Sun Ra, recorded in 1986 in Italy and released on the Black Saint label in 1987.

== Reception ==
The AllMusic review by Scott Yanow stated that "this studio set is not recommended for swing purists who take life too seriously, but the creative and often crazy music should delight many listeners".

Professional ratings
Review scores
Source	Rating
AllMusic	4.5/5 stars
The Penguin Guide to Jazz Recordings	3/4 stars

== Track listing ==
All compositions by Sun Ra except as indicated

1. "State Street Chicago" – 7:52
2. "Nothin' from Nothin'" (Pat Patrick) – 4:24
3. "Yesterdays" (Otto Harbach, Jerome Kern) – 7:46
4. "Say It Isn't So" (Irving Berlin) – 6:11
5. "I Dream Too Much" (Dorothy Fields, Jerome Kern) – 5:03
6. "Reflections in Blue" – 8:20

- Recorded at Jingle Machine Studio, Milano, on December 18 and 19, 1986.

== Personnel ==
- Sun Ra – piano, synthesizer, vocals
- Randall Murray – trumpet
- Tyrone Hill – trombone
- Pat Patrick – alto saxophone, clarinet
- Marshall Allen – alto saxophone, flute, piccolo, oboe
- Danny Ray Thompson – alto saxophone, baritone saxophone, flute, bongos
- John Gilmore – tenor saxophone, clarinet, timbales
- Eloe Omoe – alto saxophone, alto clarinet, bass clarinet
- James Jacson – bassoon, Ancient Egyptian Infinity Drum
- Ronald Wilson – tenor saxophone
- Carl LeBlanc – electric guitar
- Tyler Mitchell – bass
- Thomas Hunter, Earl "Buster" Smith – drums
