= Freddie Freeloader (album) =

Studio album by Jon Hendricks
- Released: 1990
- Recorded: 1990
- Genre: Vocal jazz
- Length: 57:39
- Label: Denon
- Producer: Jon Hendricks

Jon Hendricks chronology
Love (1982)	Freddie Freeloader (1990)	Boppin' at the Blue Note (1994)

Professional ratings
Review scores
Source	Rating
Allmusic	4.5/5 stars

Freddie Freeloader is a 1990 studio album by Jon Hendricks.

== Track listing ==
1. "Jumpin' at the Woodside" (Count Basie, Jon Hendricks) – 3:31
2. "In Summer" (Hendricks, Bruno Martino) – 5:48
3. "Freddie Freeloader" (Miles Davis, Hendricks) – 9:09
4. "Stardust" (Hoagy Carmichael, Mitchell Parish) – 3:55
5. "Sugar" (Maceo Pinkard, Stanley Turrentine) – 5:12
6. "Take the "A" Train" (Billy Strayhorn) – 3:04
7. "Fas' Livin' Blues" (Hendricks) – 5:37
8. "High As a Mountain" (Davis, Gil Evans, Hendricks) – 1:32
9. "Trinkle Tinkle" (Hendricks, Thelonious Monk) – 4:46
10. "Swing That Music" (Louis Armstrong, Horace Gerlach, Hendricks) – 2:55
11. "The Finer Things In Life" (Hendricks) – 2:33
12. "Listen to Monk" (Hendricks, Monk) – 6:36
13. "Sing Sing Sing" (Hendricks, Louis Prima) – 3:52

== Personnel ==
- Jon Hendricks - tenor saxophone, vocals, producer, liner notes, vocal arrangement
- Kevin Burke - vocal
- George Benson
- Al Jarreau
- Bobby McFerrin
- Judith Hendricks - trumpet, vocal
- Wynton Marsalis - trumpet
- Randy Sandke
- Lew Soloff
- Joe Temperley - alto saxophone, baritone saxophone, tenor saxophone
- Jerome Richardson - alto saxophone
- Stanley Turrentine - tenor saxophone
- Al Grey - trombone
- Britt Woodman
- Andy McCloud III - double bass
- Tyler Mitchell
- George Mraz
- Rufus Reid
- Clifford Barbaro - drums
- Jimmy Cobb
- Duffy Jackson
- Romero Lubambo - guitar
- Margaret Ross - harp
- Tommy Flanagan - piano
- Larry Golding
- Barry Finclair - viola
- Al Rogers - violin
- Andy Stein
- Ron McBee - percussion
- Count Basie Orchestra
- Mark Lopeman - conductor
- Kiyomitsu Mihara - design, cover design
- Brian Lee - engineer, mixing
- Chaz Clifton - engineer
- Josiah Cluck
- Geoff Gillette
- Josiah Gluck
- Howard Johnston
- Stan Wallace
- Takao Homma - executive producer
- Hiroyuki Hosaka - mastering
- David Berger - arranger, conductor
- Frank Foster - arranger, tenor saxophone, vocal
