= Carl LeBlanc =

American guitarist and banjo player (born 1955)

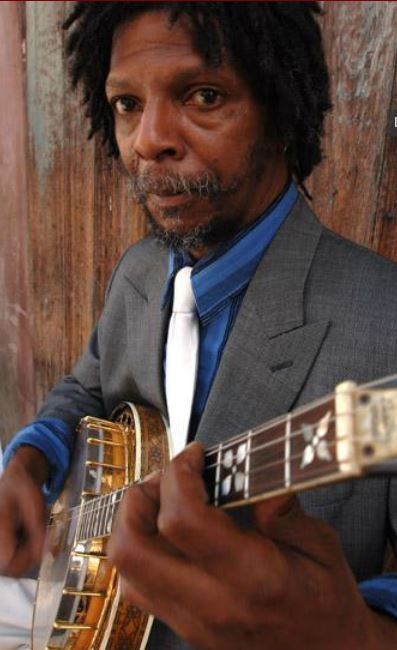

Background information
- Born: Carl LeBlanc, Jr. May 26, 1955 (age 71)
- Origin: New Orleans, Louisiana, United States
- Genres: Jazz, Avant-garde jazz, Bebop, R&B
- Occupations: Musician, educator
- Instruments: Guitar, banjo, vocals
- Years active: 1967-present

Carl LeBlanc (born May 26, 1955) is an American guitarist, four-string banjo player, composer and educator. LeBlanc is most striking for his work in both avant garde jazz and traditional jazz—being the only musician to work with famed afrofuturist keyboardist/bandleader Sun Ra and Preservation Hall.

LeBlanc has recorded seven solo albums during his career blending the varying styles of traditional jazz, avant garde jazz, bebop, and New Orleans tradition, namely Mardi Gras Indian and Second line style. He has also served as banjo player at Preservation Hall, following in the footsteps of his predecessor Narvin Kimball, and directed the Preservation Hall Junior Jazz and Heritage Band.

== Biography ==
LeBlanc was born in New Orleans, Louisiana in the Seventh Ward. He heard the city's brass band parades in his neighborhood when he was a child, but it was The Beatles's famous Ed Sullivan Show appearance which inspired him to play the guitar. At the early age of 12 he began performing with a high school-aged band The Sonics at The Wonderful Boys Club, a social and pleasure hall, and served as apprentice to many of the neighborhood's musicians.

LeBlanc received a scholarship to Columbia University where he studied Music Education after being recruited by former Jesuit High School classmates. He would later graduate from Southern University of New Orleans, studying under the tutelage of Kidd Jordan, and move to Philadelphia to play with renowned jazz musician Sun Ra.

During his career, LeBlanc has also performed with Fats Domino, Screamin' Jay Hawkins, the Dirty Dozen, Allen Toussaint, Bo Diddley, Ellis Marsalis Jr., James Rivers, Blind Boys of Alabama, and Irvin Mayfield & the New Orleans Jazz Orchestra. LeBlanc continues preserving the legacy of New Orleans music tradition through education and performing.

== Discography ==
=== As leader ===
- Sidewalk Serenade (Independent, 1975)
- Bebop (Independent, 1979)
- Gazebo Afternoon (Independent, 2004)
- New Orleans’ Seventh Ward Griot (Preservation Hall, 2008)
- Partners (Independent, 2009)
- Those Who Have Ears (Independent, 2011)
- Justin Case (Independent, 2012)
- Purple House (Independent, 2021)

=== As sideman ===
with Sun Ra:

- Reflections in Blue (Black Saint, 1986)
- Hours After (Black Saint, 1986)
- Blue Delight (A&M Records, 1988)
- Mayan Temples (Black Saint, 1990)
- Somewhere Else (Rounder Records, 1993)
- The Complete Remastered Recordings on Black Saint & Soul Note (CAM Jazz, 2015)
- Lights on a Satellite (IN + OUT, 2024)

with Preservation Hall Jazz Band:

- The Hurricane Sessions (Preservation Hall, 2008)
- Preservation: An Album to Benefit Preservation Hall & The Preservation Hall Music Outreach Program (Preservation Hall, 2010)
- The 50th Anniversary Collection (Preservation Hall, 2012)

with The Del McCoury Band and Preservation Hall Jazz Band:

- American Legacies (Preservation Hall, 2011)

with The Blind Boys of Alabama:

- Down in New Orleans (Time-Life, 2008)

with Fats Domino:

- Alive and Kickin' (Independent, 2006)
- Legends of New Orleans: Fats Domino Live! (Shout! Factory, 2003)

with Treme Brass Band:

- New Orleans Music (Mardi Gras Records, 2008)

with Lucien Barbarin:

- It's Good To Be Home (Independent, 2007)

with Johnny Adams:

- The Verdict (Rounder, 1995)

with Eddie Bo:

- Eddie Bo and Friends (Bo-Sound, 1995)
- Back Up This Train (Bo-Sound, 1996)
- Nine Yards of Funk (Bo-Sound, 1998)
- We Come To Party (Bo-Sound, 2001)

with Kermit Ruffins:

- Livin’ a Treme Life (Basin Street, 2009)

with Pretty Lights:

- A Color Map of the Sun (Preservation Hall, 2013)

other works:

- Dick Tracy Original Soundtrack (Sire/Warner Bros. Records, 1990)
- Louisiana Spice (Independent, 1995)
- Promenades en Louisiana (Independent, 1999)
- Our New Orleans: A Benefit Album for the Gulf Coast (Nonesuch Records, 2005)
- Goin’ Home: A Tribute to Fats Domino (Independent, 2007)

== Awards and nominations ==
Year	Nominee / work	Category	Award	Result
2009	Down in New Orleans as a sideman with the Blind Boys of Alabama	Best Traditional Soul Gospel Album	Grammy Awards	Won
2026	Lights on a Satellite as a sideman with Sun Ra Arkestra	Best Large Jazz Ensemble Album	Grammy Awards	Nominated
