= Of Mythic Worlds =

Studio album by Sun Ra
- Released: 1980
- Genre: Free jazz
- Length: 40:13
- Labels: Philly Jazz; PJ 1007
- Producer: Sun Ra

Sun Ra chronology
Live from Soundscape (1979)	Of Mythic Worlds (1980)	Strange Celestial Road (1979)

Of Mythic Worlds is an album by composer, bandleader and keyboardist Sun Ra and his Arkestra, recorded in 1978 or 1979 and released on the Philly Jazz label.

== Reception ==
Professional ratings
Review scores
Source	Rating
AllMusic	3.5/5 stars
Spin Alternative Record Guide	8/10

The AllMusic review by Sean Westergaard stated: "This is another album that will probably be tough to find but well worth it".

== Track listing ==
All compositions by Sun Ra except where noted

1. "Mayan Temples" – 7:48
2. "Over the Rainbow (Harold Arlen, Yip Harburg) – 5:15
3. "Inside the Blues" – 5:45
4. "Intrinsic Energies" – 8:40
5. "Of Mythic Worlds" – 12:55

== Personnel ==
- Sun Ra – piano, organ, synthesizer
- Marshall Allen – alto saxophone, flute, oboe
- John Gilmore – tenor saxophone, percussion
- James Jacson – bassoon, flute, percussion
- Danny Ray Thompson – baritone saxophone, flute
- Eloe Omoe – bass clarinet, flute
- Richard Williams – bass
- Luqman Ali – drums
- Atakatune – percussion
