= Shandar =

French record label

Shandar was a French record label specializing in avant-garde material that did seminal work during the 1970s releasing, among others, recordings by Albert Ayler, Karlheinz Stockhausen, Steve Reich, Sunny Murray, Philip Glass, Richard Horowitz, Charlemagne Palestine, La Monte Young, Alan Silva, Pandit Pran Nath, Terry Riley, Cecil Taylor and Sun Ra. The records often carry, besides the name Shandar, the logo Shanti.

The label was financed by Aimé and Marguerite Maeght, creators of the Maeght Foundation which organized modern art exhibitions and concerts. Consequently, much of the label's catalog consists of recordings of Maeght-sponsored concerts, as in the cases of Cecil Taylor's and Albert Ayler's Nuits de la Fondation Maeght. Among the works in its catalog, one of the most unusual is La Monte Young's Dream House 78′ 17″, containing the music for one of Young's installations, the Dream House: both sides were almost 40 minutes long for a total duration of 78′ 17″, a length unheard of at the time but made necessary by the nature of the work. The label also released Guitares Dérive, written and performed live by the classical guitar duo Vincent Le Masne and Bertrand Porquet.

In spite of the unique material it owned, the label was short-lived. According to the magazine The Wire, a cellar beneath an art gallery in 40 Rue Mazarine in Paris where founders Daniel Caux and Chantal Darcy worked was flooded in 1979, damaging irreparably both vinyl stocks and recordings. The gallery closed soon thereafter and Shandar vanished.

Some of its catalog was subsequently bought by other small labels and is therefore still available, but much of it has disappeared.
