= Walter Bolden =

American jazz musician (1925–2002)

- Born: Walter Bolden; 1925; Hartford, CT
- Died: February 7, 2002 (aged 76) Manhattan
- Genres: Jazz
- Occupation: Musician
- Instrument: Drums

Walter Bolden (December 17, 1925 – February 7, 2002) was an American jazz drummer.

On joining Horace Silver’s trio (with Joe Calloway on bass), Bolden worked with Stan Getz in 1950, touring and recording in 1951.

He later recorded with Gerry Mulligan (1951), before joining Howard McGhee’s band.

In 1954, he played with Teddy Charles and recorded with Henri Renaud (1954) and toured and recorded with Lambert, Hendricks, and Ross.

He was also a member of the quintet led by Zoot Sims and Al Cohn.
