= Knoel Scott =

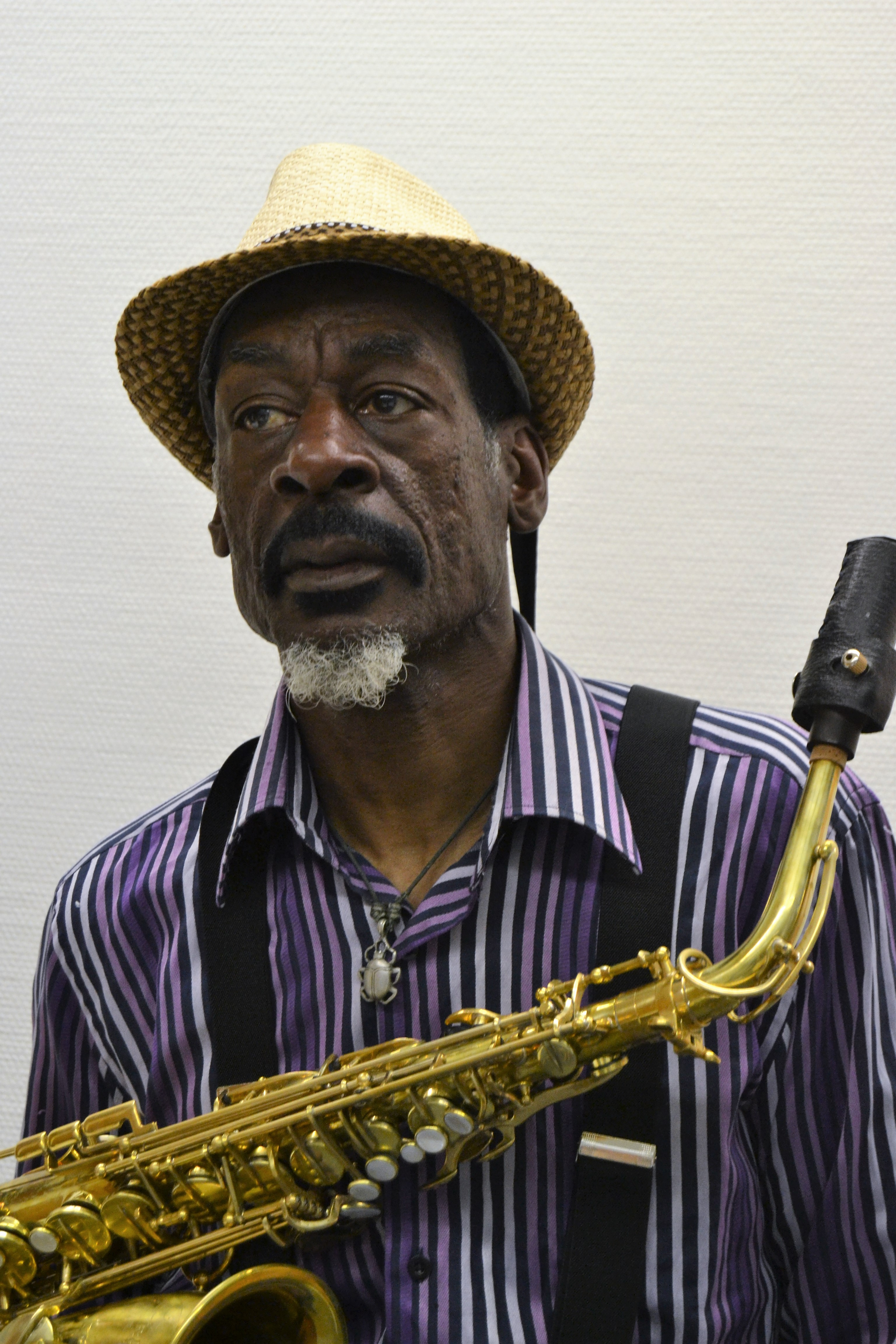

Background information
- Born: July 18, 1956 (age 69); Jamaica, New York
- Genres: Jazz, avant-garde jazz
- Occupations: Jazz musician, composer, bandleader
- Label: El Saturn Records

Knoel Scott (born July 18, 1956) is an American jazz saxophonist, composer and bandleader. He plays baritone, tenor and alto saxophone in addition to flute, while his live performances often include singing and dancing. He is best known for his work with keyboardist/bandleader Sun Ra and is an original member of the Sun Ra Arkestra under the direction of Marshall Allen.

== Background ==
Knoel Scott was born Noel Scott on July 18, 1956, in Baltimore, Maryland, to Brooks and Kathaniel Walker Scott. His father Brooks Scott is listed as deceased on Scott's birth certificate, and he was raised by Robert and Edith Nero in Jamaica, Queens. Scott studied at Queens College from 1974 to 1976, and also at State University of New York at Old Westbury, where he graduated in 1979. Scott studied additionally at Jazzmobile with such musicians as Frank Foster, Charles Davis, John Stubblefield and Lisle Atkinson.

== Sun Ra Arkestra ==
Scott auditioned for Sun Ra in July 1979, having first heard the Arkestra at the Beacon Theatre in 1977–78. Scott said in a 2011 interview that he "immediately decided that membership in the Arkestra would be [his] life's dream." He subsequently began recording and touring with the Sun Ra Arkestra.

== Other collaborators ==
Between 1981 and 1988, Scott worked with a variety of musicians including Olu Dara, Seleno Clarke, Bobby Forrester, Jack McDuff, Andy Razaf, Freddie Drew, Nat Williams, Don Pullen and John Hicks, Larry "'88 keys" Keyes, Jimmy "Preacher" Robbins, Charles Earland, Victor Davis, Tommy Turrentine, Jerry González, Bucky Thorpe, Panama Wallace, Buddy Mack, Jann Parker, Leon Thomas, and many others.

== Return to Sun Ra and present ==
In 1988 Sun Ra invited Scott back to the Arkestra, to fill a reed-section chair temporarily vacant during an absence of Marshall Allen. Scott retained that chair to the present day — usually playing alto sax but occasionally tenor or his native baritone. Sun Ra also encouraged Scott to dance and sing, and in a 2012 review of the Arkestra for two.one.five Magazine, Elijah Bliss says: "Vocalist and saxophonist Knoel Scott's voice, honeyed with just the right amount of gravel, echoed clear across the field, melding with the big brass of the Arkestra's horn section, coaxing patrons from their lawn chairs to the grassy dance floor. After all, music that swings this hard just can't be listened to sitting down."

Reviewing a 2015 appearance by the Knoel Scott Quartet (KSQ) at the 100 Club in London, Kevin Le Gendre wrote: "Although his main CV credit, mainstay of the Sun Ra Arkestra for the best part of four decades, may suggest that he comes from one of the most singular of locations on the landscape of African-American music, the saxophonist unveils a much wider set of references. In his tails and engaging stage presence we see a shade of Cab Calloway; in the unabashed romanticism of his singing, particularly on the second set highlight 'Don't Misunderstand' we feel the spirit of Nat 'King' Cole; and in the bulk of the material we hear extensions of Charlie Parker and Dizzy Gillespie’s bebop innovations.... Scott, and this is the most impressive thing about the performance, provides an all too rare display of how all of the aforesaid disparate historic characters are part of a bigger, coherent story."

Matthew Ruddick's review of the same evening reads in part: "the audience is treated to fluid brew of bop, swing, [L[atin strolls and free jazz fireworks. There is a whiff of Pharaoh Sanders in Scott's alto sax [...] Scott is a bit of a mover and he throws a few shapes whilst his charges show off their chops. He is also blessed with a fine bluesy baritone voice and he managed to bathe the room in film noire [sic] longing..."
