= Tam Fiofori =

Nigerian documentary photographer (1942–2024)

- Born: Tamunominabo Fiofori; 1942; Okrika, Colony and Protectorate of Nigeria
- Died: 25 June 2024 (aged 82)
- Other name: Uncle Tam
- Education: King's College, Lagos; King's College London
- Occupations: Photographer, filmmaker
- Father: Emmanuel Fiofori

Tam Fiofori (1942 – 25 June 2024) was a Nigerian documentary photographer. Notable for his albums chronicling Nigeria's history, Fiofori was also a filmmaker, writer, critic and media consultant. The subjects of his films include the Nigerian artists Biodun Olaku, J. D. 'Okhai Ojeikere and Olu Amoda. Much travelled, Fiofori lived in Harlem, New York, in the 1960s, becoming Sun Ra's manager, and producing writing that is considered "a founding connection between Ra and the movement that would be known as Afrofuturism". Fiofori died on 25 June 2024, at the age of 82.

== Early life and education ==
Born in Okrika in Rivers State, southern Nigeria, in 1942, Fiofori grew up in Benin City, where his father, Emmanuel Fiofori, taught at Edo College.

Fiofori was educated at King's College, Lagos, going on to university studies at King's College London, in 1959, before turning his attention to writing and music. As a student in London, he interacted significantly with a group of pioneering Nigerian musicians who were students at Trinity College of Music: Adam Fiberesima, Peter King, Fela Ransome-Kuti (later known as Fela Anikulapo-Kuti) and Wole Bucknor.

== Career ==
In a 2019 article, Fiofori wrote: "By 1965, I had ventured into music journalism and criticism and started writing for American music magazines from London. My first major article, for Change magazine, was a review of Ornette Coleman's London concert during Coleman's first-ever tour of Europe in 1965."

Travelling extensively since the 1960s, Fiofori became an associate in the US of Sun Ra. According to the Pan African Space Station, "Uncle Tam later invited Sun Ra to Lagos for FESTAC 77, took him to the Kalakuta Republic . . . and wrote about it all in the Nigerian journal Glendora Review."

Fiofori was the first New Music/Electronic Music Editor for DownBeat, and wrote for many other art and literary publications in the US and Europe — among them International Times and Change magazine — and has been credited with being "largely responsible for bringing underground black creativity to the American national consciousness in those heady days of the 1970s". His writing has been regularly published over the years in a range of Nigerian outlets, including NEXT newspaper, and the blog Shèkèrè.

Fiofori was a film consultant to Rivers State Council for Arts and Culture, the director of Rivers State Documentary Series, and consultant/scriptwriter to NTA Network on Documentaries. He was also founding executive of the Photographers' Association of Nigeria (PAN).

His work has been shown in Africa, Europe and the US, including Odum and Water Masquerades (1974), screened at FESTAC '77, Tampere Film Festival, 10th FESPACO, Ouagadougou, 1987, Pan African Writers' Association, Accra, Ghana, and 1979: A Peep into History and Culture.

His publications include the "print documentary" A Benin Coronation: Oba Erediauwa (2011). As described by the author: "The book's journalistic format has technically provided for 84 pages of photography featuring about 150 original photographs, accompanied by 72 pages of text; all about the Benin City Coronation ceremonies of Oba Erediauwa as the 38th Oba of the Benin Kingdom, from March 23 to 30, 1979." Nigeria's Guardian newspaper judged that Fiofori "paints a poetically enchanting picture", and said: "The author undertakes a very insightful rendering of the dynasties of the Benin Kingdom and gives an elaborate account of the 45-year reign of Oba Akenzua II which started on April 5, 1933.... Tam Fiofori has through his groundbreaking book, A Benin Coronation: Oba Erediauwa, given Nigeria and the rest of the world a timeless study in lofty heritage."

He was a contributor to the 2018 book African Photographer J. A. Green: Re-imagining the Indigenous and the Colonial (edited by Martha G. Anderson and Lisa Aronson), in a review of which Lindsay Barrett referred to Fiofori as "Nigeria's iconic photographic genius". Among other publications to which he contributed are Voices from Within: Essays in Honour of Sam Amuka, 2015, where he wrote "The rise and rise of press photography" (pp. 95–106), and Entertainment Media: Redefining Reality, Situating Entrepreneurship, 2020, where he wrote "Film, Entertainment, and Social Consciousness" (pp. 30–37).

Fiofori died on 25 June 2024, aged 82. Paying tribute to him, Femi Odugbemi said: "Tam Fiofori's legacy is one of brilliance, innovation, and an unyielding spirit. He not only chronicled history but also inspired a new generation of filmmakers and photographers to pursue truth and authenticity in their work."

== Awards ==
Among honours Fiofori had received are awards from the Pan African Writers' Association (PAWA), iRepresent International Documentary Film Festival, and Music in Africa.

== Films ==
- Odum and Water Masquerades, 1974
- Biodun Olaku: Nigerian Painter
- J. D. ‘Okhai Ojeikere: Master Photographer
- Olu Amoda: A Metallic Journey, 2015 (60 mins)

== Exhibitions ==
- 2006–2007: Bayelsa @ 10. Yenagoa, Abuja.
- 2010: 1979: A Peep into History and Culture. Oba's Palace, Benin City; Hexagon, Benin City

== See also ==
- List of Nigerian film producers
