= The Sun Ra Arkestra =

Jazz band led by Sun Ra

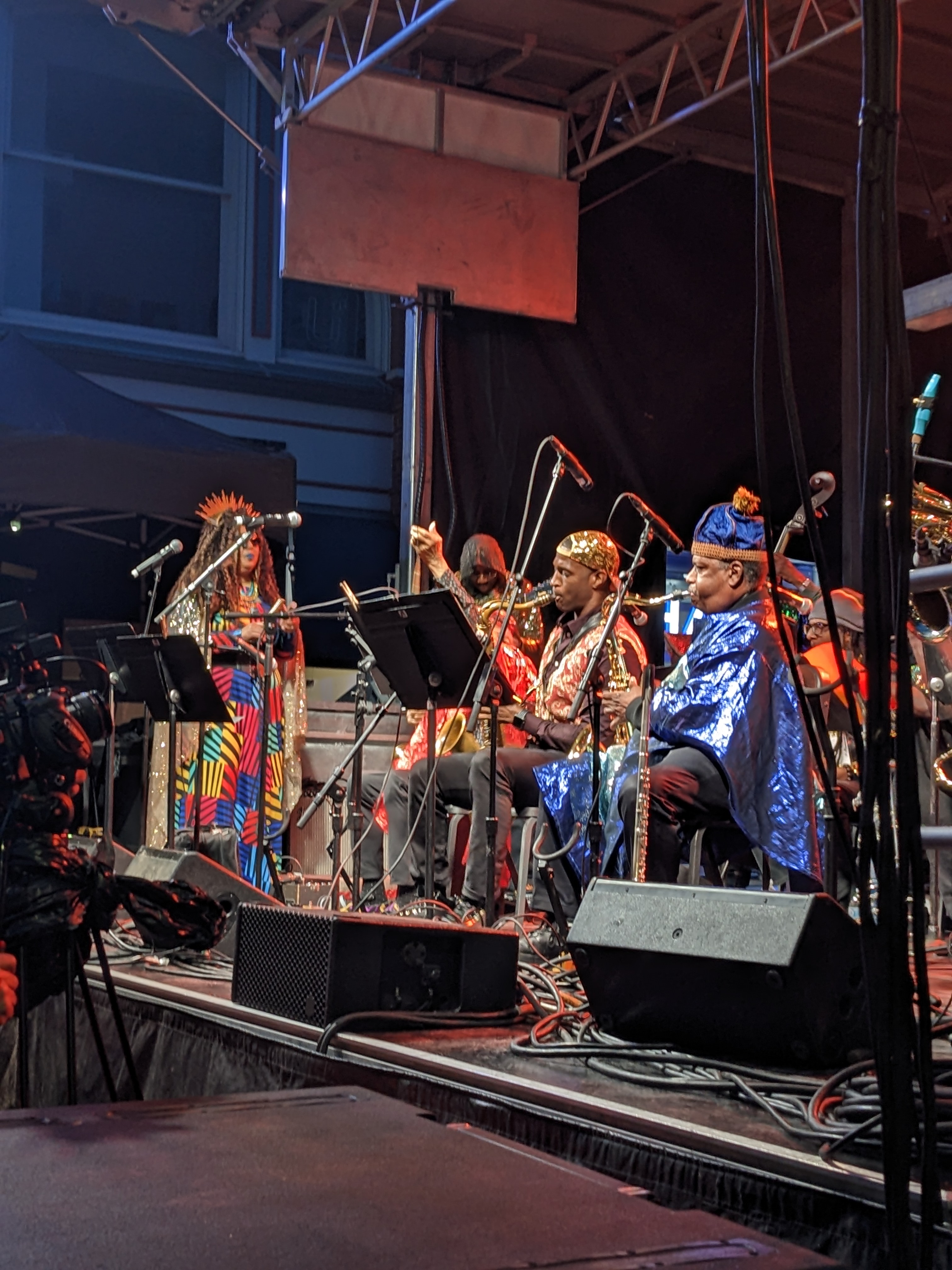
- 2023 Burlington Discover Jazz Festival

Background information
- Also known as: The Myth Science Arkestra; The Solar Myth Arkestra; The Omniverse Arkestra; The Blue Universe Arkestra; The Astro Infinity Arkestra; The Jet Set Omniverse Arkestra; The Intergalactic Solar Arkestra
- Origin: Philadelphia, Pennsylvania, United States
- Genre: Jazz
- Years active: 1952 - present
- Past members: Sun Ra, Atakatune (Stanley Morgan), Danny Ray Thompson
- Website: sunraarkestra.com

The Sun Ra Arkestra is an American jazz group formed in the mid-1950s and originally led by keyboardist/composer Sun Ra until his death in 1993. Sun Ra, and the Arkestra, are considered pioneers of Afrofuturism. Since 1995 the Arkestra has been led by saxophonist Marshall Allen, a member since 1958. Most recent lineups consist of more than one dozen members. They were nominated for a Grammy Award in 2026.

The Arkestra draws from a range of musical genres: swing, rock 'n' roll, Chicago blues, improvisation, and electronic. When the Arkestra performs, the band members wear Afrofuturist-inspired outfits dominated by colorful capes and headdresses.

== History ==
The group was formed in the 1950s as the ensemble that regularly backed Sun Ra. It is headquartered in a rowhouse in Philadelphia's Germantown neighborhood. Saxophonist and current leader Marshall Allen has lived and worked in the house since 1968. Also in 1968, vocalist June Tyson joined the group. She helped to define the Arkestra's sound through her vocals and spoken word performances, and contributed to its distinctive costumes and choreography. Her close collaboration with Sun Ra continued until her death in 1992.

In 1993, John Gilmore became the leader of the Arkestra after Sun Ra died. Gillmore died in 1995, and the leadership role was taken by Marshall Allen, who continues to lead to group to the present day and beyond his 100th birthday. Allen endeavored to release original albums under the Sun Ra Arkestra name, with the first being A Song for the Sun in 1999.

In 2009, Philadelphia's Institute of Contemporary Art hosted an exhibition of the group's history and artistry. In 2017, the Arkestra opened for Solange on tour. Their 2020 album Swirling included the first-ever studio recording of the Sun Ra song "Darkness". Their 2024 album Lights on a Satellite was nominated for the Grammy Award for Best Large Jazz Ensemble Album in 2026.

== Members ==
Current line-up

- Marshall Allen - alto saxophone, flute, EWI (joined 1958)
- Vincent Chancey - french horn (joined 1976)
- Michael Ray - trumpet, vocals (joined 1978)
- Knoel Scott - baritone & alto saxophone (joined 1979)
- Fred Adams - trumpet (joined 1982)
- Ronnie Burrage - drums (joined 1984)
- Tyler Mitchell - bass (joined 1985)
- Elson Nascimento - surdo, percussion (joined 1988)
- Jorge Silva - repinique, percussion (joined 1989)
- Kash Killion - cello (joined 1989)
- Dave Davis - trombone (joined 1997)
- D. Hotep - guitar, electronics (joined 2000)
- James Stewart - tenor sax, flute (joined 2011)
- Farid Abdul-bari Barron - piano
- Cecil Brooks - trumpet
- George Gray - drums
- Chris Hemingway - alto & soprano saxophone
- Tara Middleton - voice, percussion, violin (joined 2012)
- Anthony Nelson - baritone saxophone
- Robert Stringer - trombone

== Discography ==
Studio albums

- A Song of the Sun (1999)
- Swirling (2020)
- Living Sky (2022)
- Lights On a Satellite (2024)

Live albums

- Babylon Live (In + Out Records/2015)
