= Michael Ray (trumpeter) =

American jazz trumpeter (born 1952)

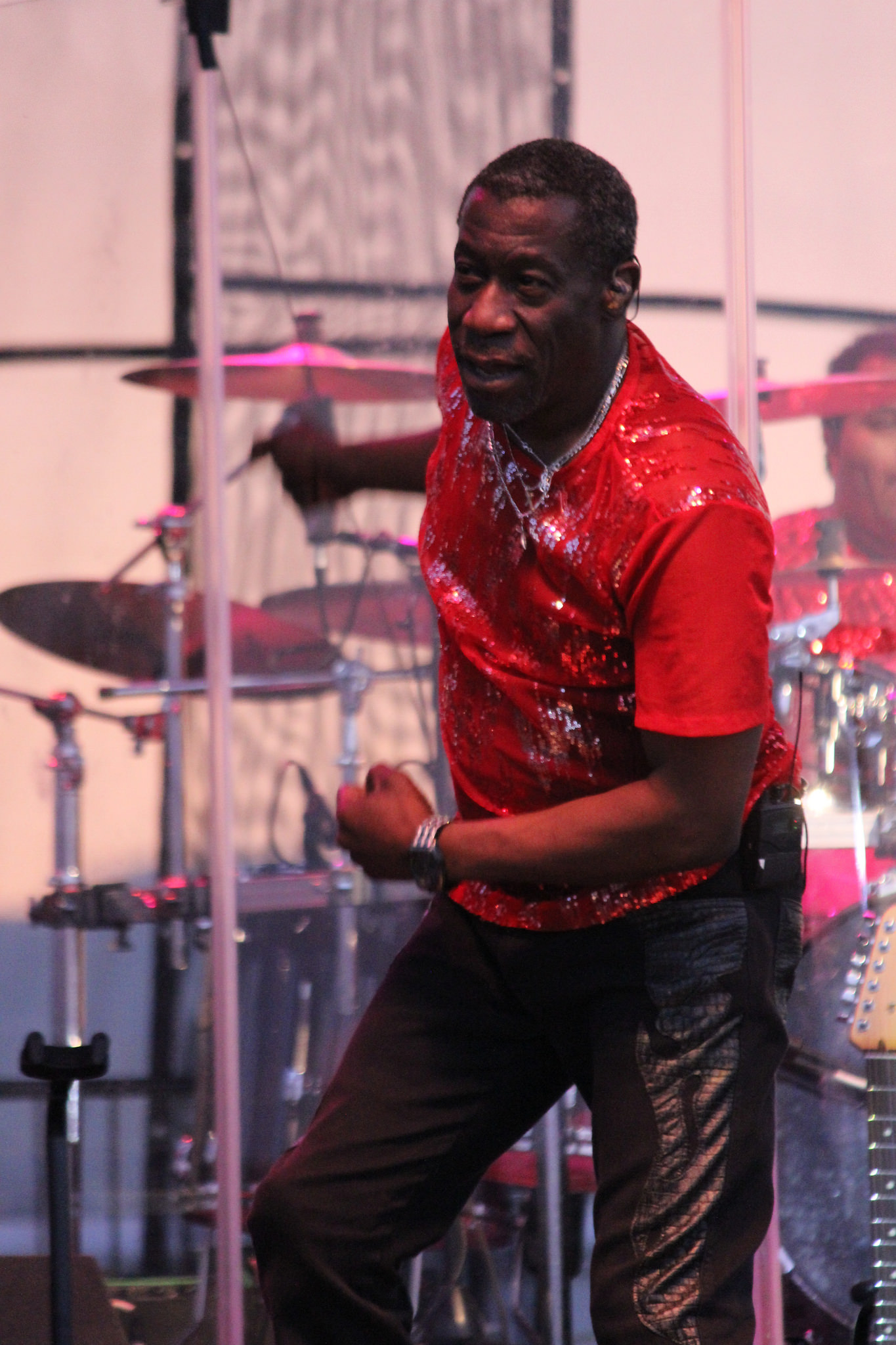
Michael Ray with Kool & the Gang at Loessfest in Council Bluffs, Iowa, May 29, 2016.

Michael Ray (born December 24, 1952) is an American jazz trumpeter. He tours extensively with Kool & the Gang, Sun Ra and the successor Sun Ra Arkestra under Marshall Allen's direction following Sun Ra's passing. For a period from the mid-1990s to the present he leads his own band, Michael Ray and the Cosmic Krewe. His playing with Sun Ra and independently has incorporated funkjazz, R & B, electronica and fusion genres.

== Background and early professional life ==
He is originally from Trenton, New Jersey and was born December 24, 1952. His professional start was performing with R & B acts such as Patti LaBelle, The Delfonics and The Stylistics. Michael Ray is married to Laranah Phipps Ray, Jazz vocalist of Phipps Family, Newark's 1st Family of Jazz

== Sun Ra ==
Ray joined Sun Ra's band in 1978. He appears on Sun Ra albums on Saturn Records and on CDs released by Evidence, Enja, HatHut, Rounder Records, Black Saint/Soul Note, Horo Records, A&M Records, Philly Jazz and ESP-Disk labels. Ray also mixed Mayan Temples, Sun Ra's last studio session (Black Saint/Italy-1992).

In 1989 he moved to New Orleans and established several music projects, particularly the Cosmic Krewe. He has released records in the 1990s and 2000s under his leadership.

Michael Ray continues to perform with the Sun Ra Arkestra and has appeared with rock band Phish, live and on two Elektra recordings (A Live One and Trey Anastasio's Surrender to the Air). He recently worked on a PBS soundtrack for producer Delfeayo Marsalis and appears on recordings of Galactic drummer Stanton Moore and avant rockers Iris May Tango. He has made special appearances with many popular groups including Aquarium Rescue Unit, Medeski, Martin & Wood, Widespread Panic, U2, Porno for Pyros, Col. Bruce Hampton, Jazz is PHSH, and Deep Banana Blackout.

Michael Ray is currently collaborating with jazz vocalist Laranah Phipps. Several projects are in the works.
