= June Tyson =

American musician and dancer (1936–1992)

- Born: February 5, 1936; Albemarle, North Carolina, United States
- Died: November 24, 1992 (aged 56) Philadelphia, Pennsylvania, United States
- Occupations: Musician, dancer
- Instruments: Vocals, violin
- Years active: 1968–1992

June Tyson (February 5, 1936 – November 24, 1992) was an American singer, violinist, and dancer who performed with bandleader Sun Ra.

== Biography ==
A native of Albemarle, North Carolina, Tyson worked in Harlem during the 1960s as a singer. She performed in a series of outdoor Broadway musicals in Manhattan's Jackie Robinson Park, where, in 1968, Lem Roebuck, manager of the Sun Ra Arkestra, recognised her talents and introduced her to bandleader Sun Ra. She became the only woman in his band, performing solo, duets, and call-and-response vocals. Tyson also worked as the band's costume designer, choreographer, and violinist. Her husband, Richard Wilkerson, was a member of the crew who designed lighting and sound. Their home in Harlem became a regular stop for members of the band.

== Discography ==
As a featured performer with Sun Ra and his Arkestra

- The Saturnian Queen of the Sun Ra Arkestra (Modern Harmonic, 2019)

With Sun Ra and his Arkestra

- Nuits De La Fondation Maeght (Vos. 1 & 2) (Shandar, 1971)
- Live In Paris At The "Gibus" (Atlantic, 1973)
- Astro Black (Impulse, 1973)
- Space is the Place (Blue Thumb, 1973)
- Concert For The Comet Kohoutek (ESP, 1973)
- Taking a Chance on Chances (El Saturn, 1977)
- Lanquidity (Philly Jazz, 1978)
- Sleeping Beauty (El Saturn, 1979)
- Strange Celestial Road (Rounder, 1980)
- Purple Night (A&M, 1989)
- Mayan Temples (Black Saint, 1992)
- Somewhere Else (Rounder, 1993)
- Soundtrack To Space Is The Place (Evidence, 1993)
- Intergalactic Research (Transparency, 2007)
- The Shadows Took Shape (Transparency, 2007)
- The Universe Sent Me (Transparency, 2008)
- Live At The Horseshoe Tavern, Toronto 1978 (Transparency, 2008)
- Live At Slug's Saloon (Transparency, 2008)
- Newport Jazz Festival-The Electric Circus (Transparency, 2009)
- Live In Cleveland (Vinyl Lovers, 2009)
- The Road To Destiny (Transparency, 2010)
- Live in Rome (Transparency, 2010)
- Duke Ellington’s Sound Of Space (Squatty Roo, 2015)
