= Danny Ray Thompson =

American jazz musician (1947–2020)

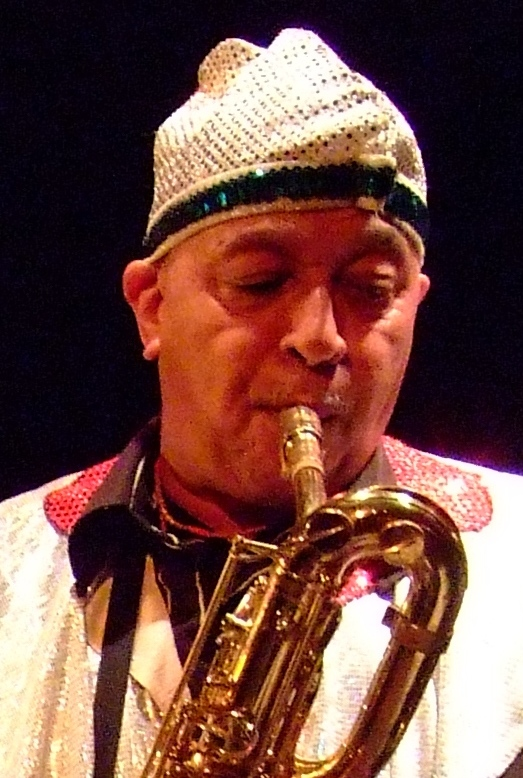
- Thompson, in 2008

Background information
- Born: October 1, 1947; New York City, New York, U.S.
- Died: March 12, 2020 (aged 72) Philadelphia, Pennsylvania
- Genres: Avant-garde jazz, free jazz, experimental
- Occupation: Musician
- Instruments: Baritone saxophone, bassoon

Danny Ray Thompson (October 1, 1947 – March 12, 2020) was an American jazz musician. He played baritone saxophone with the Sun Ra Arkestra and managed the band for a period of time.

== Early life ==
Thompson was born in New York City, to Elgie and Oscar Leonard Thompson. Soon his family moved to Los Angeles, California, but after high school, Thompson returned to New York City and attended night classes at Juilliard School.

== Career ==
Thompson's first concert was with Babatunde Olatunji and after meeting Marshall Allen, Thompson was introduced to Sun Ra. The first Arkestra album Thompson appeared on was 1967's Atlantis. He made his first live appearance with the Arkestra in April 1968 at Carnegie Hall.

Thompson, along with fellow Arkestra members Marshall Allen and Charles Davis, was present for a 100th birthday celebration for Sun Ra at the Berklee College of Music in 2014.
