= Offering: Live at Temple University =

Live album by John Coltrane
- Released: September 23, 2014
- Recorded: November 11, 1966
- Venue: Mitten Hall, Temple University, Philadelphia, Pennsylvania, United States
- Genre: Free jazz
- Length: 90:45
- Language: Instrumental; English
- Label: Resonance; Impulse!

John Coltrane chronology
| The Very Best of John Coltrane: The Prestige Era (2012) | Offering: Live at Temple University (2014) |

Offering: Live at Temple University is a live album by John Coltrane recorded in 1966 and released posthumously by Resonance Records on September 23, 2014, Coltrane's 88th birthday. The album won the Grammy Award for Best Album Notes and was well received by critics. Proceeds from the album benefit the John Coltrane Home.

== Background ==
Coltrane and his quintet, which featured saxophonist Pharoah Sanders, pianist Alice Coltrane, bassist Jimmy Garrison and drummer Rashied Ali, toured Japan in July 1966 (documented on Live in Japan). Immediately upon their return, they played a two-week stint at the Jazz Workshop in San Francisco (July 26 – August 7), followed by an appearance at the Village Theatre in New York City on August 12. Toward the end of the summer, Garrison, who had played with Coltrane since 1961, and who was the last remaining member of the "classic quartet," announced that he would depart Coltrane's group to join a trio led by pianist Hampton Hawes. He was replaced for the most part by Sonny Johnson (brother of trumpeter Dewey Johnson, who had participated in the recording of Coltrane's Ascension), although Sirone occasionally played with the group during this time as well.

While in Japan, Coltrane began experiencing intense headaches, causing him to "gulp... aspirin by the bottle," and hinting at the presence of the liver cancer that would take his life the following year. After Coltrane's death, Rashied Ali noticed how a number of the photographs he had taken during the Japan tour showed Coltrane holding a hand over his abdomen. "like he was trying to stop that pain he must have been feeling all by himself." In an interview with Frank Kofsky, Coltrane stated: "the pace I've been leading has been so hard and I've gained so much weight, that sometimes it's been a little hard physically." Upon returning from the tour, Coltrane told producer George Wein he felt weak and had stopped eating, and cancelled a proposed fall European tour which would have included England, The Netherlands, and the Berlin Jazz Festival. Coltrane did not perform during the month of September, during which he turned forty.

From this point on, Coltrane's schedule of public appearances became more sporadic and less demanding. On October 7, he and his group (without Sanders), performed at the Massachusetts Institute of Technology's Kresge Auditorium. Coltrane was also listed in an advertisement for a benefit concert on October 30 at the Village Gate, but it is not certain that he appeared. In early November, he played at a benefit concert at the Church of the Advocate in his home town of Philadelphia. His group at this concert consisted of Sanders, Alice Coltrane, possibly Sonny Johnson on bass, and Muhammad Ali, Rashied's younger brother, on drums. They were joined by Algie DeWitt on percussion and saxophonist Sonny Fortune, who sat in.

Poster advertising the November 11, 1966 concert at Temple University.

This was followed by the November 11 concert at Temple University's Mitten Hall Auditorium, which was broadcast live on radio station WRTI, and which appears on Offering. The audience "included university students, members of the black radical organization The Revolutionary Action Movement, old friends of Coltrane, and local fans and musicians. One of them was an 18-year-old Michael Brecker." Afterwards, incomplete bootleg tapes of the concert circulated among fans for years. In 1997, Coltrane's son Ravi gave a copy of one of these tapes to Coltrane scholar Yasuhiro Fujioka, who then managed to track down the full, original tapes, which were in the possession of Michael Biel, who had been program director at WRTI in 1966. Biel was then introduced to an executive from Universal Music, which has rights to Coltrane's late recordings, and Universal then licensed the project to Resonance Records. The recording was transferred from the original master reels, remastered, and released in 2014.

== Personnel ==
For the November 11 concert, Coltrane's group included Sanders, who had participated in the recording of Don Cherry's album Where Is Brooklyn? earlier that day, Alice Coltrane, Sonny Johnson, possibly Jimmy Garrison, and Rashied Ali. They were supplemented by Algie DeWitt (a Batá drummer whom Coltrane had met the previous week at the Church of the Advocate concert), Omar Ali (Rashied's older brother), Robert Kenyatta, and Charles Brown, all playing percussion. Coltrane had experimented with using multiple drummers for well over a year, explaining that he had "drum fever". In the liner notes for Meditations, he stated: "I feel the need for more time, more rhythm all around me. And with more than one drummer, the rhythm can be more multi-directional. Someday I may add a conga drummer or even a company of drummers." In a 1990 interview, Rashied Ali recalled: "[Coltrane] was in a drummer thing... There were times I played with Trane, he had a battery of drummers, like about three conga players, guys playing batas, shakers and barrels and everything. On one of his records he did that. At the Village Vanguard, live, we had a whole bunch of drummers plus the traps. And then sometimes he would have double traps."

In addition to this group, two local alto saxophonists, Arnold Joyner and Steven Knoblauch (who was an 18-year-old college student at the time), were permitted to sit in, and each took a solo. Their presence was consistent with Coltrane's habit of inviting younger, relatively unknown musicians to participate. (Dave Liebman recalled attending a concert in which Coltrane featured "what looked like an army of guys he got off the street.")

== Music ==
The music on Offering consists of tunes that were familiar to Coltrane fans, as well as newer material. "Naima" dated back to 1959, and first appeared on Giant Steps, while "My Favorite Things" was first recorded by Coltrane in 1961. "Crescent" dated back to the 1964 album of the same name. "Offering" would be recorded in the studio on February 15, 1967, and would be released on Expression and Stellar Regions, while a studio recording of "Leo" would be created on February 22, 1967, and would appear on Jupiter Variation and the CD reissue of Interstellar Space.

On Offering, the beginning of "Naima" is missing; according to an update to The John Coltrane Reference, "The concert should have begun with an introduction by Master of Ceremonies Ron Wertheimer of WRTI-FM. However, when Wertheimer walked on stage, Coltrane followed immediately behind him and began playing before Wertheimer could speak... [recording] engineer Jerry Klein was waiting for Wertheimer's introduction." "Leo" is also incomplete: it "fades out and the applause at the end is probably dubbed."

Resonance Records' web page for Offering notes that "[t]he immense life-force that animates the proceedings on this November 1966 evening in Philadelphia belies the declining state of Coltrane's health. It is still difficult to grasp and to accept that he was firmly in the grip of the liver cancer that would still his voice on July 17, 1967." Rashied Ali recalled: "The way he played on the stage and as much power he used to play the saxophone, I had no idea that he was sick." Richard Brody described Coltrane's playing on Offering as "even more fervent and, at times, furious than it had been... Yet his heightened, trance-like playing has a core of stillness, of devotional tranquility; his music is like a whirlwind with an eye of serenity."

"Leo" features a passage, "long debated in almost mythological terms by fans who saw Coltrane live", in which Coltrane vocalizes while beating his chest. Rashied Ali stated: "People really thought he'd lost his mind then. He wasn't even playing anything recognisable with the horn." Ali recalled asking Coltrane "Trane, man, why are you doing that, beating on your chest and howling in the microphone?" Coltrane responded: "Man, I can’t find nothing else to play on the horn." Ali concluded: "He exhausted the saxophone. He couldn't find nothing else to play... he ran out of horn." Ben Ratliff, however, has noted the logic behind Coltrane's singing:

Ali solos alone for a while, with drumsticks, beating rapidly on snare and toms. Coltrane enters, first tapping bells, then singing while beating his chest; at first it is the I–II–V pattern, the same melodic cell that you hear at the beginning of the melody of "Wise One," and the "Acknowledgement" section of A Love Supreme, and then it builds methodically on that. The drumming on his chest mimics Ali's patterns. He is singing, not screaming. It couldn't be more logical. After forty-five seconds of this, he picks up his tenor and resumes where he had left off... But this sort of thing has not passed down through history as an image of control—even to his friends, contemporaries, even learned musicians.

Ravi Coltrane stated: "For me, the Temple recording is an affirmation that, no, he didn't exhaust the saxophone... The saxophone was just a tool, one over which he had a master's command. His voice was an extension of the saxophone as the saxophone was an extension of his voice. When you hear that transition on 'Leo,' it's totally seamless in energy, vibe and intention." Richard Brody wrote that Coltrane's vocalizations "sound like spontaneous and ingenuous expressions of rapturous joy... they're right at home in Coltrane's open-ended quasi-hangout band, in the familial intimacy that gives rise to its vulnerable furies."

== Reception ==
Professional ratings
Review scores
| Source | Rating |
|---|---|
| AllMusic | 4.5/5 stars |
| Pitchfork | 8.5/10 |

The most immediate reaction to the music on Offering came from Dave McLaughlin and Bob Rothstein, the on-air hosts for the WRTI radio show. Their off-the-cuff comments following the broadcast included: "It's unlike anything I've ever heard before, to tell you the truth, I've never attended a concert or a jam session or anything like this before in my life"; "John Coltrane himself said that this is not a jazz concert that we were to hear this evening, but yet some sort of a spiritual revivalment or something. And that I guess would maybe be a better terminology to use than a jazz concert"; and "It was the strangest thing I've ever seen in my entire days of listening, watching, appreciating jazz." Writing about the concert in The Village Voice, Francis Davis described a "reverent, overflow crowd" but noted: "the walkouts began 15 minutes or so into the evening's first tune... What was shocking about the exodus was that these were Coltrane addicts presumably undaunted by the turbulence and complexity of his music to that point, but grief-stricken by what they were hearing now... To many of Coltrane's fans, including some who looked as though they wanted to leave but sat rigid with disbelief, this concert and others like it amounted to a breach of trust for which he still hasn't been completely forgiven." Davis himself, however, "stayed for the entire concert and was on his feet cheering at the end." (Davis was a student at Temple at the time, and was inspired by the concert to become a jazz writer.)

Recent reactions have, in general, been more positive. In Rolling Stone, Colin Fleming described the album as "a jazz grail: no tunes, just a sonic storming of the heavens... It's the sound of longing unbound." Writing for AllMusic, Matt Collar wrote that Coltrane's band "seems to have codified the spiritually infused free jazz, modal, and Indian raga influences Coltrane had been exploring since the early '60s," and describes them as "an ensemble of like-minded musicians unified as much by spiritual concerns as creative ones." He stated: "while there certainly is something otherworldly and transformative about Offering, it's also utterly tangible, visceral, and organically Technicolor in the way only the best live performances are." Collar concluded: "though we will never know where Coltrane would have taken his music had he lived, Offering works as a live culmination of Coltrane's musical journey, a homecoming and spiritual communion with the deep, creative forces that drove him right until the end of his life and, based on the music here, one can only assume beyond."

In London Jazz News, Andy Boeckstaens wrote that Offering is "exhausting and uplifting, and documents a massive slice of emotional, raw and sometimes frenzied jazz." All About Jazz reviewer Robert Bush wrote: "For those inclined to dismiss 'late-period 'Trane' as an unfortunate derailment, Offering probably won't induce many conversions. But for those who are willing to go there—this recording represents a new opportunity to hear the master at the absolute height of his powers reaching into his personal vortex and showering sparks into our darkness." On the Jazz Views web site, Euan Dixon wrote that Offering "provides us with a glimpse of a performer operating at the height of his powers showing no signs of the affliction that would shortly silence him... The music is stark and uncompromising but infused with energy and passion that cannot fail to impress even those at odds with the Coltrane aesthetic and must leave everyone who hears it – like it or not – with a profound impression of his artistic integrity and magisterial command."

Richard Brody stated that Coltrane's band, "playing free of harmonic structures and foot-tapping rhythm, gives the succession and shift of musical events a tumultuous, organic flow. In the grand scope of its development and in the tumble of its frenetic incidents, the performances make perfect, natural dramatic sense." Writing for Jazz Times, Steve Greenlee asked: "Is Offering: Live at Temple University a great album? No. It's too weird, too difficult, too gritty, too... nonmusical. Is it an essential album? By God, it is. No one is going to listen to this album on repeat. But from this point on, no one can claim to know Coltrane without hearing it." In a review for Pitchfork (where the album was noted as Reissue of the Week), Mark Richardson wrote: "Considering his stature in American music, every note of John Coltrane's music deserves release. That's a given. But that doesn't necessarily mean that every note has something for the broader music listening public. Offering passes that test, it's both an 'important' jazz release and one that's actually enjoyable to listen to."

In a review for Audiophile, Mark Smotroff wrote: "For a 1966 monaural recording made essentially by student engineers in a college auditorium, I think it sounds pretty spectacular – a live recording made with a single mic (according to the liner notes, they suspect) set closer to Coltrane. The 'mix' (if you will) is thus quite Sax heavy, but it is what it is. Fidelity wise, it is very clean and overall full sounding with mostly a stage sound and very little audience noise."

Saxophonist Michael Brecker was a senior at Cheltenham High School, just north of Philadelphia, when he attended the concert at Temple. He recalled that it "lived up to and surpassed all my expectations," and "literally propelled me into choosing music as a life's endeavor"

== Track listing ==
All songs written by Coltrane, unless otherwise noted

1. "Naima" – 16:28
2. "Crescent" – 26:11
3. "Leo" – 21:29
4. "Offering" – 4:19
5. "My Favorite Things" (Oscar Hammerstein II and Richard Rodgers) – 23:18

== Personnel ==
John Coltrane Quintet

- John Coltrane – soprano and tenor saxophones, flute, vocals, bandleader
- Rashied Ali – drums
- Alice Coltrane – piano
- Sonny Johnson – upright bass
- Pharoah Sanders – tenor saxophone and piccolo

Additional musicians

- Omar Ali – percussion
- Charles Brown – percussion
- Algie DeWitt – percussion
- Arnold Joyner – alto saxophone
- Robert Kenyatta – percussion
- Steven Knoblauch – alto saxophone

Technical personnel

- Bernie Grundman – mastering
- Ashley Kahn – liner notes
- Frank Kofsky – photography
