= Mary Oliver (violinist) =

American jazz musician

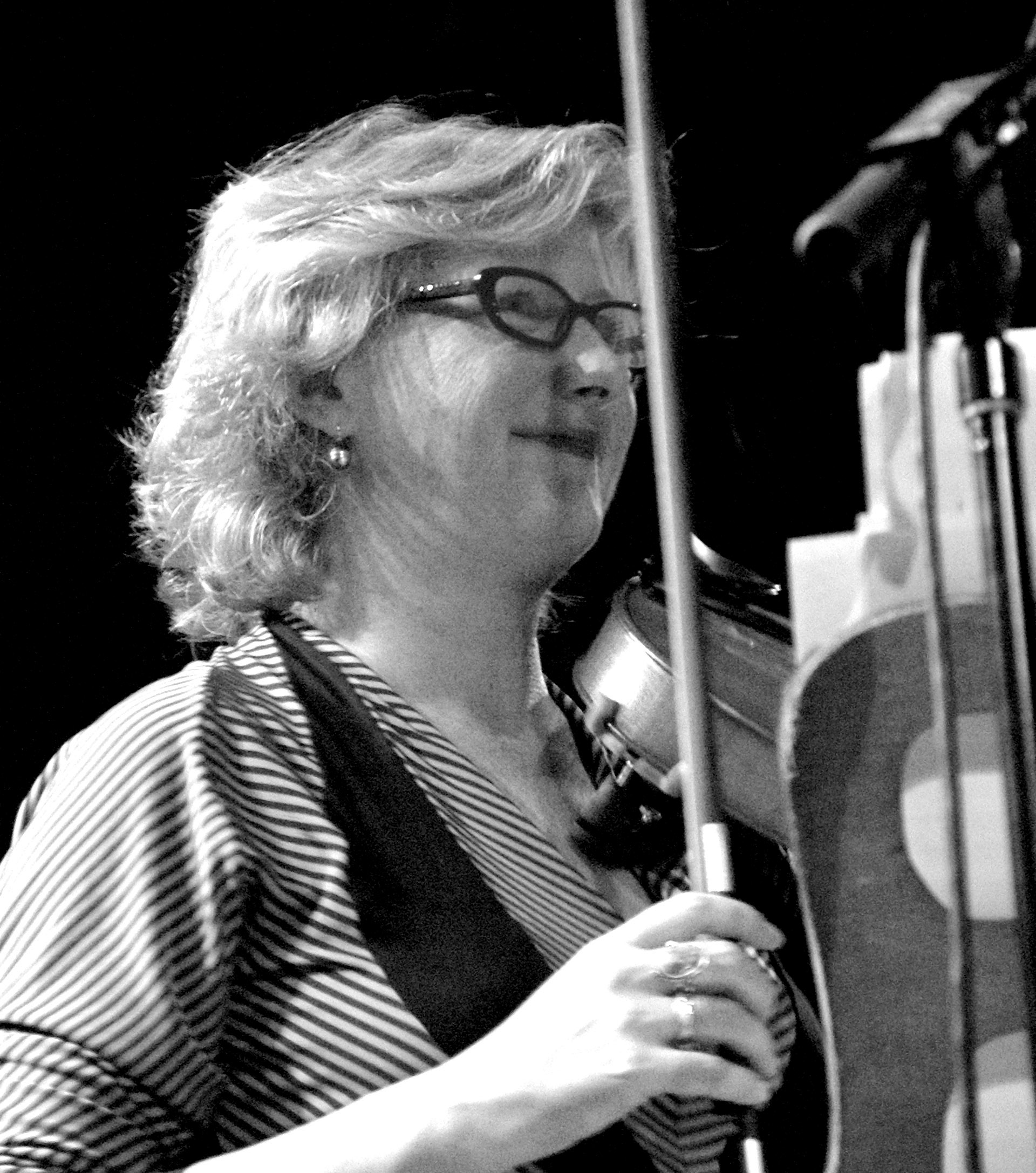

Background information
- Genres: New Music, free improvisation, and avant-garde jazz
- Instruments: violin; viola; Hardanger fiddle

Mary Oliver (born in La Jolla, California) is an American performer on violin, viola, and Hardanger fiddle, in the areas of New Music, free improvisation, and avant-garde jazz.

She currently lives in Amsterdam, where she is professor at the Amsterdam University of the Arts (Hogeschool voor Kunst) and musical director of the Magpie Music Dance Company. She also performs and releases albums with the Instant Composers Pool.

== Education ==
Oliver studied for her Master of Fine Arts in violin and viola at San Francisco State University and at Mills College. In 1993 she obtained a doctorate from the University of California, San Diego in Theory and Practice of Improvisation (Constellations in Play: A Model of Improvisation), which substantially informed her methods as a performer.

== Career ==
As a soloist she performs as much composed as improvised music, giving first performances of works by composers such as Richard Barrett, John Cage, Chaya Czernowin, Morton Feldman, Brian Ferneyhough, Liza Lim, George E. Lewis and Richard Teitelbaum. Oliver is a member of the Nieuw Ensemble, SONOR and KIVA, as well as the ICP-Orchestra.

She has performed with, among others, Ab Baars, Sean Bergin, Tobias Delius, Scott Fields, Ig Henneman, Tristan Honsinger, Achim Kaufmann, Joëlle Léandre, Thomas Lehn, George E. Lewis, Misha Mengelberg, Phil Minton, Michael Moore and Evan Parker. She has received invitations to perform at festivals all over the world, such as the North American New Music Festival, Xenakis Festival in Buffalo, New York, Darmstadt Summer Course, Donaueschingen Festival and Ars Electronica (Linz).

== Critical acclaim ==
Mary Oliver is referred to as an internationally acclaimed Amsterdam violinist. The Austin Music Co-op lauds "Her premieres of new works by John Cage, Richard Barrett, Brian Ferneyhough, and Iannis Xenakis," and that they "speak to the level of virtuosity she has achieved. Her equally brilliant work as an improviser is a rarity in the ranks of first-rate classical interpreters."

== Partial discography ==
- Witchfiddle ICP 038
- ICP-Orchestra, Oh, My Dog! ICP 040
- ICP-Orchestra, Aan en Uit ICP 042
- Ig Henneman Strijkkwartet, Pes Wig 05
