= Corona (album) =

Live album by Cecil Taylor
- Released: 2018
- Recorded: November 1, 1996
- Venue: Podewil, Berlin
- Genre: jazz
- Length: 1:00:49
- Label: FMP
- Producer: Jost Gebers

Cecil Taylor chronology
Always a Pleasure (1996)	Corona (2018)	Almeda (2004)

Corona is a live album by Cecil Taylor recorded during the "Total Music Meeting" at the "Podewil", the headquarters of the Kulturprojekte Berlin non-profit organisation, on November 1, 1996, one day before the recording of the Taylor album Almeda, and two days before the recording of The Light of Corona. It was released in 2018 in digital format by the FMP label as part of their Archive Edition, and was reissued in 2021 in CD format by Corbett vs. Dempsey.

The album consists of three tracks. Track one begins with a Taylor poetry recitation, accompanied by vocalizations by the members of the ensemble that would join him on Almeda and The Light of Corona. Track two is a long duet featuring Taylor and drummer Sunny Murray, with whom Taylor last recorded on the 1981 album It Is in the Brewing Luminous. The vocalizing musicians return for track three, and Taylor completes his poetry recitation. Ensemble member Chris Jonas recalled being surprised by Murray's appearance, as on the previous day, Taylor announced: "Sunny Murray's coming in, and he'll be playing with us tomorrow night, and we'll see what happens thereafter... We have to wait and see what moon Sunny is in."

== Reception ==
Professional ratings
Review scores
Source	Rating
The Free Jazz Collective	4/5 stars

In a review for The New York City Jazz Record, Pierre Crépon wrote: "A Murray cliché is that he was the first musician who figured how to stop playing time. A different kind of time is at play here, corresponding to the storied relationship of two very singular individuals... The concert was among the last times the pair played together. Does Corona sum something up? Is this music that can lend itself to final assessments? No, but it is another link in a long and solid chain, another occasion to examine, uncluttered and anew, what two truly towering artists had to offer."

Writing for JazzWord, Ken Waxman described the opening of the duo section: "the focus is on building a duo intersection of timbral motifs, fragments and dynamics. Hard drum-top rattles and rumbles plus triangle and cymbal clanks begin to solidify the drummer's interaction while crossed hand key pushes and rolling pulses figure into the piano introduction. Within a few minutes the exposition moves from andante to allegrissimo as Taylor's sweeps extend into glissandi and dips into the piano's nether regions, connecting with Murray's metal clanging and snare clapping. With metronomic and staccato dynamics, the pianist interpolates passing tones as he works through the theme steeple-chasing up and down the scale, with timbres doubled by the drummer's paradiddles and pops."

In an article for Burning Ambulance, Phil Freeman remarked: "The pristine sound and quality instruments on Corona... allow the music to blossom fully, and it's breathtaking. Murray's snare and toms crack like thunder, while Taylor's piano playing is like raindrops striking the surface of a stormy ocean, the flow of notes never-ending and the momentum seemingly unstoppable."

Martin Schray of The Free Jazz Collective commented: "the European influence on Taylor's playing is obvious. In general, the piece gets its charm from the clash of this 'new' Taylor with Murray's traditional free jazz drumming. Taylor isn't interested in finding some sort of synthesis here, but rather in sifting out conceptual and structural parallels... All in all, it's a fascinating performance referencing Taylor's and Murray's roots but seeing them from a new perspective.

== Track listing ==
1. "Sector 1" – 5:46
2. "Sector 2" – 48:00
3. "Sector 3" – 7:03

== Personnel ==
- Cecil Taylor - piano, voice
- Sunny Murray - drums
- Dominic Duval - voice
- Tristan Honsinger - voice
- Jeff Hoyer - voice
- Chris Jonas - voice
- Jackson Krall - voice
- Elliot Levin - voice
- Chris Matthay - voice
- Harri Sjöström - voice
