= The Olatunji Concert: The Last Live Recording =

Live album by John Coltrane
- Released: September 25, 2001
- Recorded: April 23, 1967, Olatunji Center of African Culture, New York City, New York, United States
- Genre: Free jazz
- Length: 63:38
- Label: Impulse!
- Producer: Bryan Koniarz

The Olatunji Concert: The Last Live Recording is the Impulse! Records-released final live recording of saxophonist John Coltrane, recorded April 23, 1967, at the Olatunji Center of African Culture in New York and released on Compact Disc in 2001. The album consists of two songs—"Ogunde", which Coltrane also recorded for his final approved album, Expression, and an especially free-form "My Favorite Things", which Coltrane had performed live regularly since 1960. The recording was made for broadcast on Billy Taylor's local radio station, WLIB. The Olatunji Concert was not Coltrane's last show, but rather, his penultimate—he would play once more on May 7, 1967, in Baltimore.

== Background ==
Coltrane had known Nigerian drummer Babatunde Olatunji since 1961, during which his band played opposite Olatunji's at the Village Gate, alternating with Art Blakey's group. Coltrane had studied Olatunji's recordings, and wrote the tune "Tunji," which appeared on the 1962 album Coltrane, in his honor. In 1966, Olatunji and his wife established the Olatunji Center of African Culture at 43 East 125th Street in Harlem, New York City, dedicated to "providing low cost classes in a wide range of cultural subjects to adults and children." Coltrane had provided financial support for the center while it was being built, and would continue to write checks to help cover its operating expenses. In July 1966, Coltrane "asked if he, Yusef Lateef, and Olatunji could form an organization to put on concerts, both at the Olatunji Center and at bigger venues." Olatunji also recalled that he offered to take Coltrane to Nigeria: "He said, 'When?' and I suggested the following year. He said 'God willing, I will.'"

On April 23, 1967, Coltrane and his group appeared in a benefit concert at and for the Olatunji Center. The concert poster advertised "John Coltrane & Quintet in Roots of Africa: his first appearance of 1967 in New York," and listed two shows: "4 pm - 6 pm" and "6 pm - 8 pm", with the invitation "Come join your host Babatunde. Ask Mr. Coltrane questions about his music and sound." (Only the first set was recorded.) The concert was m.c.ed by Billy Taylor, who recalled: "[Coltrane] called me and asked me to do that. Olatunji was right around the corner from the radio station [WLIB, where Taylor had a show]. I knew Olatunji's work and on the station we played him a lot. He was really trying to do something to awaken the community to his view of the African heritage." The performance space was "a 30x100 foot loftlike room on the second floor, backdropped by colorful wall posters depicting an African village scene." The day of the concert, the crowd "spilled out into the hallway and down the stairs, onto the sidewalk and around the block." After the concert, "Coltrane asked for the receipts of all spent ($425) on the promotion and gave it back to the Center... He also divided the balance of what was left ($500) after paying each musician the union scale for each concert as was agreed upon with the Center."

Years after the concert, drummer Rashied Ali recalled: "[with] all the energy of 125th Street going on right outside the window... with incense burning and the place packed, he did something I had never seen him do before — he sat down on the bandstand. I still didn’t think he was sick, because when he put his horn to his mouth, there was no faltering; the fire was up full blast." About a month after the concert, Coltrane began to complain of intense abdominal pain; he died two months after that, in July.

== Recording quality ==
The Olatunji Concert has been regarded by authors and music critics as suffering from poor recording quality. Tony Whyton notes that "Coltrane had employed engineer Bernard Drayton at short notice to record the concert outside of Coltrane's contractual obligations with Impulse! Records, so the question remains as to whether this recording was to be used for general release or as a simple documentation of a live performance event." Whyton wrote that the release "is incomplete and variable in sound quality. The sound of musicians playing live is interspersed with audience noise and sounds of traffic leaking in from outside the venue. Drayton discussed the way in which he had to switch off one of the stereo channels in order to limit the amount of external noise, and the result is one of continual change in recording conditions. In terms of musical sound, The Olatunji Concert presents an imbalance of recording quality that results in the saxophones of Coltrane and Sanders and percussion sounds of Ali and Dewitt overpowering the sounds of the piano. Garrison's bass sound is obscured through distortion, and at various stages it is difficult to distinguish between intended sounds and unintentional noise. Although issues of balance, audience noise, and fidelity are all part of the experience of 'liveness' on a live album, with The Olatunji Concert recording these factors are foregrounded to the extent that inconsistencies and the incomplete nature of the recording process are on show for all to hear."

Ben Ratliff descriptively wrote that "[Y]ou can't make music as violent, scraping, tinnily climactic as this recording suggests. It is quite possible that no worse-sounding musical document has ever been issued in full by a major record label... The acoustics in the room, a converted gym, were impossibly live, a giant echo chamber. This explains some of the extra boost in Coltrane's soprano saxophone solo in 'My Favorite Things,' and suggests how shattering Pharoah Sanders’s performance in the same song might have been, though the sound is too distorted for one to know. Twenty minutes in, the taped noise becomes unbearable, a cloud of cymbals and overdriven screams. [...] [I]t puts a question mark on the end of the story. Forget music with a social power, with a community function—that's all fine. This is almost impenetrable."

== Reception ==
Professional ratings
Review scores
Source	Rating
Allmusic	4/5 stars
Pitchfork Media	10/10
The Penguin Guide to Jazz Recordings	2.5/4 stars

In his AllMusic review, Sam Samuelson called The Olatunji Concert "a rich and telling recording", stating that it "demonstrates [Coltrane's] sonic blast free jazz direction that was becoming more aggressive and out of bounds; It portrays what could have been one of the most dynamically stellar groups of the mid-1960s avant jazz scene." He called the album "essential for seasoned Coltrane listeners." Writing for Pitchfork, Luke Buckman wrote: "For every intent and purpose, this is difficult music. It's the demanding sound of a man faced with impending death, yet unafraid to carry forward and remain steadfast to his intense, singular vision of music as a universal bridge. With every note, Coltrane chases a higher power in an attempt to transcend the corporeal. For the unprepared listener, it might all be too much-- not only because of the sheer intensity of noise levels or dissonance, but because this is the sound of a man who knows every breath he draws inches him one step closer to the grave. Yet, the sadness this evokes is overwhelmed by the pure beauty of a man being rebirthed, recreated, and reimagined. The Last Live Recording is a deliriously scattered mess of joy and pain, intermingled and bound up within Coltrane's unbridled and luminescent energy. And now it stands as his parting gesture: one last moment bursting out at the seams with elation and ferocity, an awe-inspiring testament to life."

In his review, James Beaudreau of PopMatters wrote: "It takes effort and some imagination to get past the poor recording to the music it so imperfectly relays, but such effort is well rewarded by the riches in the performance." In a BBC review, Peter Marsh wrote: "there's an intention to Coltrane's playing here which transcends much of the macho free jazz posturing of lesser players who followed in his wake. It's full of sound and fury alright, but it's signifying something... [U]ntil the invention of a time machine this is the closest we're going to get to being there. Essential." Ben Ratliff wrote that The Olatunji Concert "glows from within; it rotates furiously; it is a blur. Come close to it and it throws you off... an artist’s final work won't objectively sum up anything. It is, however, likely to be fuller of subjectivity than ever before. It's full of the life force: that's all, that's enough, that's what it needs to be. If it's truly good and powerful, it deserves to engender a thousand misunderstandings. The idea of a last work acting as a summary or a capstone is a sweet and hopeful construct. But life doesn’t add up for the living."

== Track listing ==
No.	Title	Length
1.	"Introduction by Billy Taylor"	0:35
2.	"Ogunde" (John Coltrane)	28:25
3.	"My Favorite Things" (Rodgers and Hammerstein)	34:38

== Personnel ==
- John Coltrane – soprano and tenor saxophone
- Pharoah Sanders – tenor saxophone
- Alice Coltrane – piano
- Jimmy Garrison – double bass
- Rashied Ali – drums
- Algie DeWitt – Batá drum and possibly double bass
- possibly Jumma Santos – percussion
