= Always a Pleasure =

Live album by Cecil Taylor
- Released: 1996
- Recorded: April 8, 1993
- Venue: Akademie der Kunste, Berlin
- Genre: Free jazz
- Length: 76:28
- Label: FMP
- Producer: Jost Gebers

Cecil Taylor chronology
Duets 1992 (2019)	Always a Pleasure (1996)	Corona (2018)

Professional ratings
Review scores
Source	Rating
Allmusic	4.5/5 stars
The Penguin Guide to Jazz Recordings	3/4 stars

Always a Pleasure is a live album by Cecil Taylor recorded during the Workshop Freie Musik at the Akademie der Kunste, Berlin on April 8, 1993, and released in 1996 on the FMP label. The album features a concert performance by Taylor with Longineu Parsons, Harri Sjöström, Charles Gayle, Tristan Honsinger, Sirone and Rashid Bakr.

A recording of part five of the concert, titled "Fifth Pleasure", was released by FMP in 1998 on the Taylor compilation album Concrete.

== Reception ==
In a review for AllMusic, Thom Jurek called the group "an ensemble that plays so intrinsically 'together' that it feels like the band Taylor has been trying to assemble since the death of his altoist, Jimmy Lyons", and wrote: "This is easily the best large-unit Taylor record of the '90s. Fans and curiosity seekers would be well-advised to seek it out and prepare themselves to be blown away by the depth and dimension Taylor's musical soul reveals when it is challenged and upheld by such a phenomenal group of talent".

Writing for The New York Times, Ben Ratliff gave the album a mixed review, writing: "As a Cecil Taylor-Charles Gayle album, it's a disappointment... But on other counts it succeeds: in its curious narrative flow, and its inspired passages of interplay between Mr. Taylor and the cellist Tristan Honsinger."

== Track listing ==
All compositions by Cecil Taylor.

1. "First Pleasure" – 32:56
2. "Second Pleasure" – 5:00
3. "Third Pleasure" – 30:41
4. "Fourth Pleasure" – 7:51
- Recorded at the Akademie der Kunste, Berlin on April 8, 1993

== Personnel ==
- Cecil Taylor: piano, voice
- Longineu Parsons: trumpet
- Harri Sjöström: soprano saxophone
- Charles Gayle: tenor saxophone
- Tristan Honsinger: cello
- Sirone: bass
- Rashid Bakr: drums
