= Harri Sjöström =

Finnish saxophonist

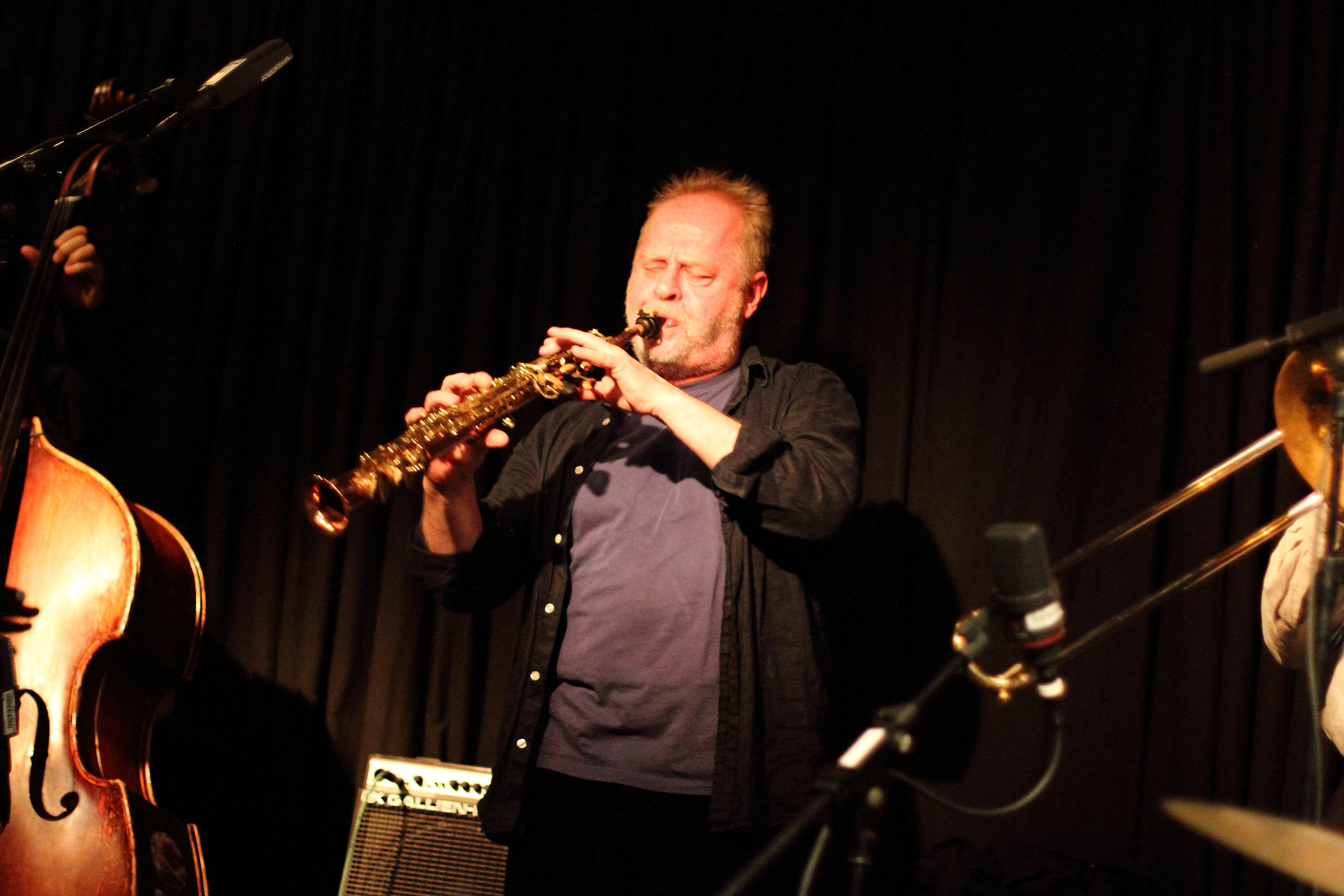
- Harri Sjöström

Background information
- Born: 29 February 1952 (age 74)
- Genres: Contemporary improvised music, free jazz
- Instrument: Soprano saxophone

Harri Sjöström (born 29 February 1952 in Turku, Finland) is a saxophonist who specializes in the soprano saxophone.

== Life and career ==
Harri studied saxophone with Harry Mann, Leo Wright and Steve Lacy. He also studied photography and film at the Lone Mountain College in San Francisco Art Institute from 1974 - 1978. He attended the special class for improvisation at the L.M.C. led by trombonist Johannes Mager.

After leaving the U.S., Harri moved to Vienna, Austria, which became his doorway to the European improvised music scene. Harri formed his first improvising groups and organised numerous projects in Finland and elsewhere. Brought many of the most notable innovators on the international improvisation scene to Finland. One of his early projects included a tour with Derek Bailey's "Company" which was their first in Finland. Harri moved to Berlin in 1985.

In 1990, Harri met Cecil Taylor in Berlin and has been involved in a large number of projects with the legendary pianist and composer since.

Harri founded the international ‘QUINTET MODERNE’ and co-founded ‘THE PLAYER IS’ trio with Teppo Hauta-Aho and Philipp Wachsmann. There's also the Bernhard Arndt / Harri Sjöström duo, which goes back to 1986. Between 1993–'95 Sjöström played with Stephan Mathieu and Olaf Rupp in a trio as ‘HAIR PIE’, occasionally joining powers with Teppo Hauta-Aho or Bernhard Arnd. His newly formed group is called ‘THREE METER DOG’ with, among others, drummer and percussionist Tony Buck and pianist Bernhard Arndt. The very latest formation ‘WAIT’ is formed in 2005.

Harri also performs solo and is involved with making film-music.

Sjöström has recorded and performed with many musicians, including Cecil Taylor, Evan Parker, Paul Lovens, Tristan Honsinger and Teppo Hauta-Aho.

== Discography ==
- Cecil Taylor Quartet Qu'a Yuba: Live at the Iridium, Vol. 2. Cadence Records CD- CJR 1098. Recorded 1998. Available on CADENCE RECORDS. USA
- Cecil Taylor Quartet Qu'a: Live at the Iridium, Vol. 1. Cadence Records CD - CJR 1092. Recorded 1998. (Cecil Taylor, Harri Sjöström, Dominic Duval, Jackson Krall). Available on CADENCE RECORDS.USA
- Cecil Taylor Almeda, FMP CD 126. (orchestra as above in "Light Of Corona"). Available on FMP RECORDS.
- Cecil Taylor The Light of Corona, FMP CD 120. (Cecil Taylor, Chris Matthay, Chris Jonas, Harri Sjöström, Elliot Levin, Jeff Hoyer, Tristan Honsinger, Dominic Duval, Jackson Krall).Available on FMP RECORDS
- Cecil Taylor-Ensemble Always a Pleasure FMP-CD 69. Recorded 1996. (Cecil Taylor, Longineu Parsons, Harri Sjöström, Charles Gayle, Tristan Honsinger, Sirone, Rashid Bakr). Available on FMP RECORDS.
- Cecil Taylor-Ensemble Melancholy FMP- CD 104, Recorded 1991. (Cecil Taylor, Tony Oxley, Tobias Netta, Wolfgang Fuchs, Harri Sjöström, Volker Schlott, Evan Parker, Thomas Klemm, Jörg Huke, Thomas Wiedermann, Barry Guy). Available on FMP RECORDS.
- Cecil Taylor Quintet Lifting the Bandstand, Fundacja Słuchaj!. Recorded 1998. (Cecil Taylor, Harri Sjöström, Tristan Honsinger, Teppo Hauta-aho, Paul Lovens).
- "Sax Syntax" Duo Harri Sjöström/ Etienne Rolin. Released on EROL RECORDS (Erol 7015), France in 1992. Available on EROL RECORDS.
- "Nicht Rot Nicht Grün" PO TORCH Rec (PO Torch 21). LP was recorded 1988/89. (Wolfgang Fuchs, Karri Koivukoski, Harri Sjöström, Paul Lovens). In preparation.
- Quintet Moderne "The strange and the common place" released on PO TORCH Rec. 1991. (Teppo Hauta-Aho, Paul Rutherford, Paul Lovens, Harri Sjöström, Philipp Wachsmann). Singlesided-LP available on PO TORCH RECORDS.
- Quintet Moderne "Ikkunan Takana" Recorded 1987. (Teppo Hauta-Aho, Jari Hongisto, Paul Lovens, Harri Sjöström, Philipp Wachsmann) LP was Released on BEAD Records (BEAD 26), London 1987. Available on BEAD Records.
- Quintet Moderne "Wellsprings" Recorded Live on November 25. 2001 in Prague Castle, Prague, Czech Republic. Cadence Records CD- CGR 1176. (Harri Sjöström, Philipp Wachsmann, Paul Rutherford, Teppo Hauta-Aho, Paul Lovens) Available on CADENCE RECORDS, USA.
