= Longineu Parsons =

Longineu Parsons may refer to:

- Longineu Parsons II, a trumpeter and music educator
- Longineu W. Parsons III, a drummer and former member of Yellowcard
