= Qu'a Yuba: Live at the Iridium, Vol. 2 =

Live album by Cecil Taylor
- Released: 1998
- Recorded: March 29, 1998
- Venue: Iridium Jazz Club, New York City
- Genre: Free jazz
- Length: 47:12
- Label: Cadence Jazz Records; CJR 1098
- Producer: Bob Rusch

Qu'a Yuba: Live at the Iridium, Vol. 2 is a live album by pianist Cecil Taylor. It was recorded at the Iridium Jazz Club in New York City in March 1998, and was released later that year by Cadence Jazz Records. On the album, Taylor is joined by saxophonist Harri Sjöström, bassist Dominic Duval, and drummer Jackson Krall. The recording is the companion to Qu'a: Live at the Iridium, Vol. 1, recorded on the same date.

== Reception ==
Professional ratings
Review scores
Source	Rating
AllMusic	4.5/5 stars
The Penguin Guide to Jazz	3/4 stars

In a review for AllMusic, Steve Loewy wrote: "It defies odds that the pianist, after so many years, continues to astound with his totally original performances. This one is vintage Taylor, with the pianist in full throttle, winding and turning phrases with characteristic brilliance. The almost unbearable intensity continues unabated, but there are waves of delicacy, too... Cecil Taylor has never played better, his technique at once symphonic and enthralling. If possible, part two surpasses the quality of part one, but it is clearly a close call."

The authors of the Penguin Guide to Jazz Recordings wrote: "Krall... is inventive and often delicately propulsive... Taylor's intensity seems as trenchant as ever."

== Track listing ==
1. "Qu'a Yuba" (Cecil Taylor) – 47:12

== Personnel ==
- Cecil Taylor – piano
- Harri Sjöström – soprano saxophone
- Dominic Duval – bass
- Jackson Krall – drums
