= Instant Composers Pool =

Dutch music label and orchestra

- Founded: 1967
- Founder: Willem Breuker, Misha Mengelberg, Han Bennink
- Distributor(s): Subterranean Distribution
- Genre: Free jazz, improvised music
- Country of origin: Netherlands
- Location: Amsterdam
- Official website: www.icporchestra.com

ICP Orchestra
- Origin: Netherlands
- Genres: Free jazz, improvised music
- Years active: 1967–present
- Members: Han Bennink; Ab Baars; Tobias Delius; Ernst Glerum; Thomas Heberer; Tristan Honsinger; Michael Moore; Mary Oliver; Wolter Wierbos
- Past members: Misha Mengelberg; Willem Breuker; John Tchicai; Peter Brötzmann
- Website: www.icporchestra.com

Instant Composers Pool (ICP) is an independent Dutch jazz and improvised music label and orchestra. Founded in 1967, the label takes its name from the concept that improvisation is "instant composition". The ICP label has published more than 50 releases to date, with most of its releases featuring the ICP Orchestra and its members.

== History ==
=== Founding ===
In 1967 saxophonist Willem Breuker, pianist Misha Mengelberg and drummer Han Bennink founded the ICP label in Amsterdam. Mengelberg and Bennink had been playing together since 1961 and found success as members of Eric Dolphy's quartet in 1964, as documented on his live album Last Date. Mengelberg had also been involved in the Fluxus art movement and was developing a composition style that involved musical games. As European free jazz musicians, they were butting up against disinterest in their music from contemporary jazz labels, so they formed a cooperative as a means to release their own recordings. Mengelberg coined the label's name as a testament to improvisation being composition at the instant that the music is played. ICP's first records documented Breuker and Bennink's New Acoustic Swing Duo, and a trio of Mengelberg and Bennink with John Tchicai, whose album was titled Instant Composers Pool.

Breuker left ICP in 1974 to concentrate on his group, the Willem Breuker Collective, and went on to found his own record label, BVHaast. Mengelberg and Bennink intensified their collaboration and, widening their own musical project as the Instant Composers Pool Tentet with saxophonist Peter Brötzmann and cellist Tristan Honsinger. Throughout the 1970s, the ICP label continued to release records, many as co-productions with other European independent labels, including albums by Jeanne Lee, Derek Bailey, Dudu Pukwana, Steve Lacy, Paul Rutherford, Evan Parker, Maarten Altena and Peter Brötzmann. Most of these releases were of limited (and sometimes even numbered) edition and featured a distinctive idiosyncratic graphic design by Bennink.

=== 1980s–present ===
By the 1980s, the ICP began to recruit younger musicians, as well as classical/new music violinist Mary Oliver. Under Mengelberg's guidance, the ICP Orchestra made studies of and recorded albums of music by jazz greats Duke Ellington, Herbie Nichols and Thelonious Monk. In the late 1980s and early 90s, ICP members collaborated with members of American post-punk/Indie rock band Sonic Youth and began their long musical career with Dutch experimental punk band The Ex with whom they continue to tour and record.

In recent years, the ICP label has focused its releases solely on members of the ICP Orchestra, including Wolter Wierbos, Mary Oliver, Tristan Honsinger and Tobias Delius. The label's earlier vinyl and cassette back catalog had not been issued on CD until the release of the label's complete catalogue as a 54-disc boxed set to commemorate the ICP's 45th anniversary in 2012.

== Label discography ==
- ICP 001: Willem Breuker/Han Bennink New Acoustic Swing Duo LP (1967)
- ICP 002: Misha Mengelberg/Han Bennink/John Tchicai Instant Composers Pool LP (1968)
- ICP 003: Willem Breuker Lunchconcert for Three Barrelorgans LP
- ICP 004: Han Bennink/Derek Bailey LP
- ICP 005: Misha Mengelberg/John Tchicai/Han Bennink/Derek Bailey Fragments LP
- ICP 006: Misha Mengelberg/Paul Rutherford/Peter Bennink/Peter Brötzmann/Evan Parker/Han Bennink/Derek Bailey Groupcomposing LP (1971)
- ICP 007/008: Various artists Instant Composers Pool 2×LP (1970)
- ICP 009: Willem Breuker The Message LP (1971)
- ICP 010: Misha Mengelberg/Han Bennink Instant Composers Pool LP (1972)
- ICP 011: Han Bennink Solo LP
- ICP 012: Maarten van Regteren Altena Handicaps LP
- ICP 013: Misha Mengelberg/Han Bennink Een Mirakelse Tocht six 7" flexi-discs (1972)
- ICP 013: Misha Mengelberg/Han Bennink Midwoud '77 LP (1974)
- ICP 014/SAJ 03: Misha Mengelberg/Han Bennink Einepartietischtennis LP (1974)
- ICP 015: Eric Dolphy/Misha Mengelberg/Jacques Schols/Han Bennink Epistrophy LP
- ICP 016: Steve Lacy Lumps LP
- ICP 017/018: Misha Mengelberg/Han Bennink Coincidents double cassette (1976)
- ICP 019: Maarten van Regteren Altena Tuning the Bass LP
- ICP 020: ICP 10-tet Tetterettet LP (1977)
- ICP 021: Dudu Pukwana/Han Bennink/Misha Mengelberg Yi Yole LP
- ICP 022: ICP Orchestra Live Soncino LP
- ICP 023: Misha Mengelberg/Han Bennink Bennink Mengelberg LP
- ICP 024: Misha Mengelberg & ICP Orchestra Japan Japon LP (1982)
- ICP 025: ICP Orchestra Extension Red White and Blue (Herbie Nichols) cassette (1984)
- ICP 026: ICP Orchestra Two Programs: Herbie Nichols/Thelonious Monk CD (1987)
- ICP 027: Han Bennink Solo VHS
- ICP 028: ICP Orchestra Bospaadje Konijnehol I CD (1990)
- ICP 029: ICP Orchestra Bospaadje Konijnehol II CD (1991)
- ICP 030: Misha Mengelberg Mix CD
- ICP 031: Misha Mengelberg/Han Bennink MiHa CD + anniversary book
- ICP 032: Wolter Wierbos X Caliber CD
- ICP 033: Tobias Delius 4 Tet The Heron CD
- ICP 034: Tobias Delius 4 Tet Toby's Mloby CD
- ICP 035: Han Bennink Solo
- ICP 036: Tristan Honsinger A Camel's Kiss CD
- ICP 037: Steve Beresford/Han Bennink B + B (in Edam) CD
- ICP 038: Mary Oliver Witchfiddle CD
- ICP 039: Tobias Delius 4 Tet Pelikanismus CD
- ICP 040: ICP Orchestra Oh, My Dog! CD (2001)
- ICP 041: Mary Oliver/Thomas Lehn/Han Bennink Pica Pica CD (2004)
- ICP 042: ICP Orchestra Aan & Uit CD (2004)
- ICP 043: ICP Orchestra Weer is een Dag Voorbij CD (2005)
- ICP 044: Misha Mengelberg Afijn DVD (2009)
- ICP 045: Alessandra Patrucco/Tristan Honsinger/Misha Mengelberg/Ab Baars/Han Bennink Circus CD (2006)
- ICP 046: ICP Orchestra Live at the Bimhuis CD
- ICP 047: Oliver & Heggen Oh, Ho! CD
- ICP 048: Tobias Delius 4 Tet Luftlucht CD (2010)
- ICP 049: ICP Orchestra ICP Orchestra CD (2010)
- ICP 050: ICP Orchestra !ICP! 050 LP (2010)
- ICP 1275-1: Various artists Complete Boxed Catalogue (limited edition) 52 CDs + 2 DVDs + book + blueprint (2012)
- ICP 051: ICP Orchestra East of the Sun CD (2014)
