= Qu'a: Live at the Iridium, Vol. 1 =

Live album by Cecil Taylor
- Released: 1998
- Recorded: March 29, 1998
- Venue: Iridium Jazz Club, New York City
- Genre: Free jazz
- Length: 1:02:25
- Label: Cadence Jazz Records; CJR 1092
- Producer: Bob Rusch

Qu'a: Live at the Iridium, Vol. 1 is a live album by pianist Cecil Taylor. It was recorded at the Iridium Jazz Club in New York City in March 1998, and was released later that year by Cadence Jazz Records. On the album, Taylor is joined by saxophonist Harri Sjöström, bassist Dominic Duval, and drummer Jackson Krall. The recording is the companion to Qu'a Yuba: Live at the Iridium, Vol. 2, recorded on the same date.

== Reception ==
Professional ratings
Review scores
| Source | Rating |
|---|---|
| AllMusic | 4.5/5 stars |
| The Penguin Guide to Jazz | 3.5/4 stars |

In a review for AllMusic, Steve Loewy wrote: "During the course of more than one hour, Taylor and his quartet perform only one piece, but do it with such exquisite finesse that it incorporates dozens of shades and styles of expression. The instrumentation may look conventional... but as with any Taylor group, the music is unique and astonishing... The results are enthralling in a very Tayloresque way."

The authors of the Penguin Guide to Jazz Recordings wrote: "Krall... is inventive and often delicately propulsive: his brushwork halfway through the first set is impeccable. Taylor's intensity seems as trenchant as ever."

== Track listing ==
1. "Qu'a" (Cecil Taylor) – 1:02:25

== Personnel ==
- Cecil Taylor – piano
- Harri Sjöström – soprano saxophone
- Dominic Duval – bass
- Jackson Krall – drums
