= Almeda (album) =

Live album by Cecil Taylor
- Released: 2004
- Recorded: November 2, 1996
- Venue: Podewil, Berlin
- Genre: Jazz
- Length: 1:16:47
- Label: FMP
- Producer: Jost Gebers

Cecil Taylor chronology
Corona (2018)	Almeda (2004)	The Light of Corona (2003)

Almeda is a live album by Cecil Taylor recorded during the "Total Music Meeting" at the "Podewil", the headquarters of the Kulturprojekte Berlin non-profit organisation, on November 2, 1996, and released in 2004 on the FMP label. The album features Taylor with eight other musicians, and is a recording of a single performance lasting over an hour. The same group recorded the album The Light of Corona the following day. In 2012, FMP also released Almeda (To Matie), with the same musicians, as part of their Archive Edition.

In the album liner notes, Volker Spicker wrote: "The diversity of musical relationships within the ensemble, the profusion of changes and the form of the entity create a process which is as manifold as life and nature itself. If you allow yourself to open up, the music raises the sensitivity, the attention for every process, for life in general in oneself. As in trance, the preconceived patterns of perception which normally put the world in a kind of schema, fade away..."

== Reception ==
Professional ratings
Review scores
Source	Rating
AllMusic	4/5 stars
The Penguin Guide to Jazz	3/4 stars

In his AllMusic review, arwulf arwulf wrote: "the nearly 77-minute performance ritual Almeda easily stands among Cecil Taylor's finest large ensemble realizations... Almeda's forces are expansive and colorfully unfurled... Taylor delivers poetry with his voice at the outset, and only participates with the piano during the closing movement, which lasts more than 35 minutes. The realm of intuitive group improvisation has been explored and celebrated in earnest since the early '60s. Almeda represents a particularly engaging plateau where nine individuals succeeded in establishing an uncommonly fertile common ground."

Writing for All About Jazz, Russ Musto commented: "There is genuine drama in the music, which is in many ways narrative, yet indescribable. There's a sense of humanity and natural order to it that leads one to believe that although it sounds like no other music, it does have its own place in describing something of this universe, or perhaps out of it. It is a soundtrack for the world of Cecil Taylor, which is indeed a very interesting world. There's sensitivity and strength, foreboding and joy, power and delicacy, conflict and conviction. It's all very refreshing and intriguing, unlike anything else in both its mechanics and spirituality... At the piano, Taylor remains a force of nature, capable of expressing the full range of emotions from the most delicate to the most intense, with a sense of pathos and humor, and inspiring his followers' incredibly creative improvisations. The music is both energizing and cathartic. It draws in the attentive listener and rewards them with an unparalleled experience that awakens the imagination and provides an escape from and insight into this world."

In a review for Dusted Magazine, Marc Medwin remarked: "I have usually preferred Taylor's solo efforts to those of the Unit, but Almeda is an entirely different animal.... this 76-minute piece focuses on timbral exploration, which is apparent from the first hushed moments. Groans, ululations, sharp exclamations, a faint drone and occasional shamanic drums fade in, as if arising from the earth. Small fragments of history gradually encroach – slides, squeaks and shrills reminiscent of what Taylor calls 'that fictitious term "jazz."'... pointillism jousts and rebounds, with Taylor spending much of the disc's early portion inside the piano, thumping, strumming and plucking... Essentially, Almeda is a huge circle, ending where it began as the sounds slowly submerge. This is a work of lightning-fast whip-crack transformation, glacial ebb and flow and static grandeur all in one, huge slab of sound. This one might even be tough going initially for longtime Taylor enthusiasts, but I can promise, top-notch playing from all, rewards a-plenty and hours of transcendental fun."

Matthew Sumera, writing for One Final Note, wrote: "Almeda must certainly go down as one of the great long-form pieces this genre of music has ever produced. Even compared with Taylor's own high standards, Almeda is a striking piece for large group improvisation, a composition of continual reinvention, constant revolution, where the whole is vastly superior to the sum of its parts... Beyond the sheer multitude of sound and device, Almeda exhibits an ironclad discipline clearly driven by Taylor's own genius. Even though his own playing is rarely featured..., the piece has his stamp all over it. The best method for approaching this 74-minute piece is, perhaps, as a solo performance, with The Ensemble representing one unified instrument rather than the work of nine men. Just as Taylor behind the piano often blurs keys and strings, his rhythms and intervals creating massive clusters that cannot be separated into constituent pieces, so too is The Ensemble similarly convened... This is group music of the highest order. Perhaps most important for its example of Taylor as band leader, a leader certainly equal to Ellington and Mingus, Almeda stands soundly beside any of the former's suites and the latter's epochal Black Saint and the Sinner Lady. Taken with Coltrane's Ascension and Coleman's Free Jazz, Almeda is a pinnacle of long-form Great Black Music, both ancient and future."

The authors of the Penguin Guide to Jazz Recordings called the album "a transcendent live set" with "some marvelous episodes along the way", but noted issues with the recording, stating: "the textures are often muddled, the piano... frequently indistinct."

== Track listing ==
Composition by Cecil Taylor

1. "Almeda" – 1:16:47
- Recorded live during the Total Music Meeting on November 2, 1996, at the Podewil in Berlin.

== Personnel ==
- Cecil Taylor – piano
- Harri Sjöström – soprano saxophone
- Chris Jonas – soprano saxophone, alto saxophone
- Elliot Levin – tenor saxophone, flute
- Chris Matthay – trumpet
- Jeff Hoyer – trombone
- Tristan Honsinger – cello
- Dominic Duval – bass
- Jackson Krall – drums
