= Stellar Regions =

Studio album by John Coltrane
- Released: October 10, 1995
- Recorded: February 15, 1967
- Studios: Van Gelder Studio, Englewood Cliffs, NJ
- Genre: Free Jazz
- Length: 45:14 (LP length); 60:48 (CD length)
- Labels: Impulse! IMP 169
- Producer: Bob Thiele

Professional ratings
Review scores
Source	Rating
Allmusic	4.5/5 stars
The Penguin Guide to Jazz	2.5/4 stars

Stellar Regions is a posthumous release by John Coltrane, drawn largely from tapes discovered in 1994 by the artist's wife, Alice Coltrane, who plays the piano on the session. Alice Coltrane is also responsible for the titles of the eight numbers featured on the album.

The material on the album is not entirely previously unreleased: the same take of "Offering" was first issued on Coltrane's final studio album, Expression. Also, the track entitled "Stellar Regions" on this album is an early version of "Venus", first released in 1974 on the sax-drums duo album, Interstellar Space. (Note: The authors of The John Coltrane Reference stated that "'Stellar Regions' is the same composition as... 'Venus'", and noted that it was originally titled "Dream Chant" in the session log. Lewis Porter wrote: "Alice Coltrane devised the titles, apparently not knowing that the title cut... is in fact 'Venus.' I noticed this when I was sent a preview tape, but it was a week before the album's release, too late to correct the error.") Stellar Regions was recorded the week prior to the session that gave rise to that album.

The album features Rashied Ali on drums and Jimmy Garrison on bass. Garrison had left Coltrane's group the previous year, but returned for these recordings.

Coltrane plays alto saxophone – something he did very rarely after 1946 – on both versions of "Tranesonic".

== Reception ==
In a review for AllMusic, Scott Yanow described Stellar Regions as "a major set", and wrote: "Trane is as powerful as usual, showing no compromise in his intense flights, and indulging in sound explorations that are as free (but with purpose) as any he had ever done. Coltrane's true fans will want to go out of their way to acquire this intriguing CD."

Coltrane biographer Ben Ratliff wrote that the album "shows a potentially great band", and stated: "This session... is the perfect representation of Coltrane at this stage. Alice Coltrane and Rashied Ali sound more connected and solidified; they are beginning to posit something concrete in place of the Tyner-Jones connection." This was a reference to pianist McCoy Tyner and drummer Elvin Jones who had helped Coltrane rise to fame, but quit in frustration about his changing musical style.

In the album liner notes, David Wild wrote that the performances on Stellar Regions "suggest evolution in new directions. Performances are more concise, with a tighter focus." He noted that "Coltrane uses a type of group composition and structure which shapes and extends the free, multi-rhythmic, sound-oriented improvisations of the previous year." Wild suggested that "the change in health, the intimations of mortality, may have led to the relative calm, the sense of reflection, of proportion and moderation to be heard here... Whatever the reason, these performances are remarkable for their conciseness and compositional structure." Wild concluded:

To those of us who remain, the last words of one no longer among us are special. These recordings all have a similar aura. Among Coltrane's final phrases, they are almost the last notes to be captured on tape, performances thus haunted by our foreknowledge that what will follow them is silence. More importantly and perhaps even more compelling, they represent a suggestion of the evolution his music would have taken had his life not been cut so short, a tantalizing glimpse of an unrealized future. The February recordings show all the features of the "late period," yet those elements seemed reharmonized, given added coherence and impact through the reappearance of form, of relative brevity, of renewed control... Change is the constant in Coltrane's work, and the evolution continued even to the last. That evolutionary line may have ended prematurely, but these eight compositions, a day's work from mid-February of 1967, stand alone as fully formed masterworks, explorations of the "late Coltrane" idiom in the format of the Classic John Coltrane Quartet, new music a quarter-century-old, still original and startling-a fresh look at the music of John Coltrane.

== Track listing ==
=== Original LP ===
Side one
No.	Title	Length
1.	"Seraphic Light"	8:57
2.	"Sun Star"	6:08
3.	"Stellar Regions"	3:34
4.	"Iris"	3:53

Side two
No.	Title	Length
1.	"Offering"	8:22
2.	"Configuration"	4:03
3.	"Jimmy's Mode"	6:00
4.	"Tranesonic"	4:17
Total length:		45:14

=== CD issue bonus tracks ===
No.	Title	Length
9.	"Stellar Regions" (Alternate Take)	4:40
10.	"Sun Star" (Alternate Take)	8:05
11.	"Tranesonic" (Alternate Take)	2:49
Total length:		60:48

== Personnel ==
- John Coltrane - tenor saxophone
- Alice Coltrane - piano
- Jimmy Garrison - bass
- Rashied Ali - drums
