= Rings of Saturn (Rashied Ali and Louie Belogenis album) =

Studio album by Rashied Ali and Louie Belogenis
- Released: 1999
- Recorded: August 9 and 19, 1997
- Studio: Survival Studios, New York City
- Genre: Free jazz
- Length: 1:14:13
- Label: Knitting Factory; KFR-232
- Producer: Rashied Ali, Louie Belogenis

Rashied Ali chronology
Live (1997)	Rings of Saturn (1999)	Decided... Already the Motionless Heart of Tranquility, Tangling the Prayer Called "I" (1999)

Rings of Saturn is an album of duets by drummer Rashied Ali and saxophonist Louie Belogenis. It was recorded during August 1997 at Survival Studios in New York City, and was released in 1999 by Knitting Factory Records. Along with six original works, the recording includes two compositions by John Coltrane, including "Saturn," which originally appeared on Interstellar Space, an album of Coltrane/Ali duets recorded in 1967.

== Reception ==
Professional ratings
Review scores
Source	Rating
AllMusic	3/5 stars
The Penguin Guide to Jazz	3/4 stars
The Encyclopedia of Popular Music	3/5 stars

In a review for AllMusic, Alex Henderson called the album "a heartfelt, satisfying date that admirers of free jazz will enjoy," and stated that, although Belogenis was clearly influenced by both John Coltrane and Albert Ayler, "he's also his own man, and the saxman makes that clear on original material as well as fiery, intensely emotional performances of the Trane pieces 'Saturn'... and 'Seraphic Light'."

The authors of The Penguin Guide to Jazz Recordings noted that "Ali's language has continued to develop in line with a new generation of players who have taken Trane's harmonic advances as a given," and praised the "ringingly successful cuts" that provide the listener with "a chance to sample a much underrated reedman."

Bill Milkowski of JazzTimes described the album as "captivating," and wrote that the duo "rekindle the kinetic energy and conversational flow of Rashied's searing duets with John Coltrane."

A reviewer for All About Jazz commented: "Belogenis... explores his own entirely distinctive musical ideas: borrowing from the structural focus of Coltrane and the tonal elasticity of Ayler... Ali's drumming occupies the fertile middle ground between regular timekeeping-oriented swing and more colorful free playing."

CMJ New Music Report's Tad Hendrickson remarked: "Ali's signature hurricane of percussion is in full torrent here, yet Belogenis's saxophone creates quite a gust of its own, touching on the wavering tone of Eric Dolphy on the slower parts and displaying some dazzlingly technical runs when things get cooking."

== Track listing ==
1. "Mahakala " (Rashied Ali/Louie Belogenis) – 10:37
2. "Keepdarigaway" (Rashied Ali/Louie Belogenis) – 9:18
3. "Saturn" (John Coltrane) – 11:38
4. "Zorn's Thorn" (Rashied Ali/Louie Belogenis) – 8:55
5. "Rings of Saturn" (Rashied Ali/Louie Belogenis) – 5:10
6. "Seraphic Light" (John Coltrane) – 9:39
7. "Takedatwitcha" (Rashied Ali/Louie Belogenis) – 10:49
8. "Vajra Prayer" (Rashied Ali/Louie Belogenis) – 8:07

== Personnel ==
- Rashied Ali – drums
- Louie Belogenis – tenor saxophone
