= The Last Giant: Anthology =

Compilation album by John Coltrane
- Released: 1993
- Recorded: 1946–1967
- Genre: Jazz
- Length: 126:26
- Label: Rhino

Professional ratings
Review scores
Source	Rating
Allmusic	link
The Penguin Guide to Jazz	3/4 stars

The Last Giant: Anthology is an album by jazz musician John Coltrane. This 2-CD set compiles recordings spanning the years 1946–1967, and was released by Rhino Records in 1993.

== Track listing ==
All tracks by John Coltrane, except where noted.

Disc one

1. "Hot House" (Dameron) – 2:00
2. "Good Grove" (Taylor) – 4:15
3. "We Love to Boogie" (Gillespie) – 2:50
4. "Bittersweet" (Smith) – 3:25
5. "Through for the Night" (Young) – 4:29
6. "Trane's Blues" – 8:32
7. "While My Lady Sleeps" (Kahn, Kaper) – 4:36
8. "Trinkle, Tinkle" (Monk) – 6:37
9. "Blue Train" – 10:40
10. "Russian Lullaby" (Berlin) – 5:30
11. "My Favorite Things" (Rodgers, Hammerstein) – 13:41

Disc two

1. "Central Park West" – 4:12
2. "Body and Soul" (Green, Eyton, Heyman, Sour) – 5:35
3. "Equinox" – 8:33
4. "Cousin Mary" – 5:45
5. "Giant Steps" – 4:43
6. "Naima" – 4:21
7. "My Favorite Things" (live) – 25:12
8. "Ogunde" (excerpt) – 1:30
