= Map of Moods =

Live album by Tristan Honsinger
- Released: 1996
- Recorded: April 27 and 29, 1994
- Venue: Straßenbahndepot, Berlin
- Genre: Free jazz
- Length: 1:17:07
- Label: FMP; CD 76
- Producer: Jost Gebers

Map of Moods is a live album by cellist Tristan Honsinger. It was recorded in April 1994 at the Workshop Freie Musik at the Straßenbahndepot in Berlin, and was released by FMP in 1996. On the album, Honsinger is joined by violinists Aleksander Kolkowski and Stephano Lunardi, bassist Ernst Glerum, and drummer Louis Moholo.

According to Honsinger, Map of Moods had its origins in a theater music work that resulted in "a constructed chaos that inspired a heightened sense of communication between the participants," in which the musicians "tried to make a cut-up narrative using a cueing system to break up the story line so that we could stop the linearity of the narrative at any point with a cue that would lead it to another point in the story before or after." The music heard on the album consists of four movements called "Areas," which, in turn, are divided into smaller units. These sections are characterized by schematic and thematic identities which "allow the composition to function as a cartographer, with improvisation filling in local color and scenery." The players are required to stick to the composer's conception of the work unless they feel they can improve upon it. Moholo acts as a director, providing guidance and trigger points for the other musicians.

== Reception ==
Professional ratings
Review scores
Source	Rating
AllMusic	4/5 stars
The Penguin Guide to Jazz	3/4 stars

In a review for AllMusic, Thom Jurek wrote: "this is a playful and profound piece of compositional genius by Honsinger, and should be sought out by anyone who has an interest in improvisational or modern European classical music."

The authors of The Penguin Guide to Jazz stated: "Honsinger's love of string instruments is well evidenced and the sound of the group is lusciously 'classical', even when the attacks are quite extreme."

== Track listing ==
All compositions by Tristan Honsinger.

1. "Area 1–Themes: Berlin / Grandfather / Jimmy the Knife / Alza Gli Occhi / Spade in Cerchio" – 20:39
2. "Area 2–Themes: Table Talk / Charles Town 1 / Charles Town 2 / Really / Arabia / Over the Top / The Man Next Door / Tango / Charles Town 3 / New 2 / Kafka 1 / Kafka 2 / Over the Top / New 1" – 39:27
3. "Area 3–Themes: The Man Next Door / Table Talk" – 8:11
4. "Area 4–Themes: Charles Town 2 / Kafka 1 / Kafka 2" – 8:51

== Personnel ==
- Tristan Honsinger – cello
- Aleksander Kolkowski – violin
- Stephano Lunardi – violin
- Ernst Glerum – double bass
- Louis Moholo – drums
