= Stretto (album) =

Studio album by Tristan Honsinger and Olaf Rupp
- Released: 2011
- Recorded: March 2010
- Studio: Berlin
- Genre: Free jazz
- Length: 59:50
- Label: FMP; CD 148
- Producer: Jost Gebers

Stretto is an album by cellist Tristan Honsinger and guitarist Olaf Rupp. It was recorded in March 2010 in Berlin, and was released in 2011 by FMP.

The album was included in the 2011 12-CD compilation FMP In Retrospect.

== Reception ==
In an article for Paris Transatlantic, Michael Rosenstein wrote: "this is 'old school', ebullient, conversational improvisation with ideas bounced back and forth and grainy textures juxtaposed. The crisp recording reveals the nuances of attack and resonance of Rupp's steel string acoustic guitar and Honsinger's unamplified cello, as the improvisations move between spiky activity and quietly evolving pools of reverberant detail."

The Whole Note's Ken Waxman stated: "the eight tracks blend the timbres from cellist Honsinger's sardonic verbal humour, col legno smacks or enhanced legato quivers with Rupp's chromatic frails plus spidery finger picking."

Writing for Monsieur Délire, François Couture commented: "Free improvisation, rather dry though rich in extended techniques, with moments that will keep you on the edge of your seat. I haven't heard much from Rupp to this day, but I'm quite fond of his playing here."

== Track listing ==
All music by Tristan Honsinger & Olaf Rupp.

Can You Imagine a Conversation Between a Table and a Chair?

1. "Can" – 8:43
2. "You" – 7:28
3. "Imagine" – 3:17
4. "A Conversation" – 4:52
5. "Between" – 6:18
6. "A Table" – 7:44
7. "And a" – 10:30
8. "Chair?" – 10:23

== Personnel ==
- Tristan Honsinger – cello
- Olaf Rupp – acoustic guitar
