= The Complete 1961 Village Vanguard Recordings =

Live album by John Coltrane
- Released: September 23, 1997
- Recorded: November 1–3 and 5, 1961; Village Vanguard, New York City, U.S.
- Genre: Jazz
- Length: 269:42
- Label: Impulse! IMPD4-232
- Producer: Bob Thiele

The Complete 1961 Village Vanguard Recordings is a box set of recordings by jazz musician John Coltrane, issued posthumously in 1997 by Impulse! Records, catalogue IMPD4-232. It collects all existing recordings from performances by the John Coltrane Quintet at the Village Vanguard in early November, 1961. Five selections had been issued during Coltrane's lifetime on the albums Live! at the Village Vanguard and Impressions. Additional tracks had been issued posthumously on the albums The Other Village Vanguard Tapes, Trane's Modes and From the Original Master Tapes.

== Background ==
It was the idea of new producer Bob Thiele to record Coltrane live over four nights in early November, Thiele meeting the saxophonist for the first time face-to-face at the club. This commenced a close working relationship between Thiele and Coltrane that would last for the rest of the saxophonist's time at Impulse. Thiele produced virtually every subsequent album. Thiele quickly secured Coltrane's trust by not insisting he record his most popular song, "My Favorite Things", during these shows. Sound engineer Rudy Van Gelder set up his equipment at a table by the stage.

== Content ==
Ten titles were performed over the course of the evenings: "Brasilia", "Chasin' the Trane", "Chasin' Another Trane", "Greensleeves", "Impressions", "India", "Miles' Mode", "Naima", "Softly, As in a Morning Sunrise" and "Spiritual". Many were performed multiple times using varied line-ups and instrumentation, the core being the Quintet of saxophonists Coltrane and Eric Dolphy, pianist McCoy Tyner, bassists Reggie Workman or Jimmy Garrison (occasionally both) and drummer Elvin Jones. Roy Haynes substituted for Jones on one song. On various songs, Coltrane added guest musicians on tampura, contrabassoon, oboe or a second double bass.

The authorship of "Miles' Mode", also known as "Red Planet", is in dispute, sometimes attributed to Dolphy rather than Coltrane.

A single-disc sampler containing the five tracks released on Live! at the Village Vanguard and Impressions was issued on February 24, 1998, as Live at the Village Vanguard: The Master Takes.

== Reception ==
Professional ratings
Review scores
Source	Rating
Allmusic	5/5 stars
The Penguin Guide to Jazz	4/4 stars
All About Jazz	4.5/5 stars
Uncut	4/5 stars

In a review for AllMusic, Thom Jurek awarded the album 5 stars, and wrote that it "adds up to... some of the most exploratory music Coltrane ever recorded -- and it was done not only in front of a live audience, but also in the presence of some mighty hostile critics. It was on this fire ground of the test that Coltrane revealed for the first time his interest -- as well as Dolphy's -- in the Indian motivic mode of improvisation, his fascination with the odd time signatures of African rhythms, and the manner in which he used scalar, modal, and harmonic forms as integrational aspects to both composition and improvisation. And while its full articulation would come on later studio recordings and in later performances, this laboratory effect offers plenty in the way of revelation here... Here on these four CDs are the exhaustive discoveries of a lifelong search and the beginning of a kind of restlessness in Coltrane's life that would consume him. Musically, the music found here is as fine as anything ever recorded in jazz history. These performances are remarkable in their certitude and in the generosity of their communication as well as in the depth and profundity of their statements. Forget the single-disc compilation, this set is one of the most important live sets from the '60s."

Writing for All About Jazz, C. Michael Bailey commented: "The Complete 1961 Village Vanguard Recordings fall right between the last Miles Davis recordings Coltrane made (Someday My Prince Will Come), Coltrane's Africa/Brass sessions and his Ballads on Impulse!. He was still three years away from A Love Supreme. Clearly, Coltrane was running in all directions... his recorded four-night stand exists as a monument to his sheer force of will in the face of harsh criticism, the definition of a true prophet or visionary... Many listeners would be put off by the direction Coltrane took after 1961, but only a fool would deny that what did come was neutronic genius, decimating everything in its path... Now that's what I call 'sheets of sound'."

In an article for The New York Times, Peter Watrous wrote that "Coltrane and his group were at their best those nights in 1961", and quoted McCoy Tyner, who stated: "We always were experimenting with something, expanding perimeters, looking for new horizons... That was the nature of the band, but when we played the Vanguard, it was an especially fresh period in the band's history. We had been spurred on by meeting Ravi Shankar, and we were planning to do an album with him that never happened. But the whole band was really on fire, and it had reached one of those plateaus." Watrous also included a reminiscence from Lorraine Gordon, wife of Max Gordon (founder of the Village Vanguard): "Coltrane would get off the stage and go back toward the men's room and keep practicing between sets... Nobody talked to him. He just practiced and played; he didn't socialize. The music he made, though, was incredible. It sounded really new, quite radical."

A reviewer for BBC Music Magazine called the album "an indispensable historical document that captures a moment in history when Coltrane's working group – with exemplary solos by McCoy Tyner and Elvin Jones – was at its peak."

== Track listing ==
All tracks composed by John Coltrane except where noted.

=== Disc one ===
No.	Title	Recording date	Length
1.	"India" (JC ss, ED bc, MT p, JG b, RW b, EJ d, AA ou)	November 1, 1961	10:33
2.	"Chasin' the Trane‡" (JC ts, ED as, RW b, EJ d)	November 1, 1961	9:52
3.	"Impressions‡‡" (JC ts, ED as, MT p, JG b, EJ d)	November 1, 1961	8:52
4.	"Spiritual‡" (JC ss, ED bc, MT p, RW b, EJ d)	November 1, 1961	12:49
5.	"Miles' Mode‡‡" (JC ts, ED as, MT p, RW b, EJ d)	November 1, 1961	10:22
6.	"Naima‡‡" (JC ts, ED bc, MT p, RW b, EJ d)	November 1, 1961	7:40

=== Disc two ===
No.	Title	Writer(s)	Recording date	Length
1.	"Brasilia‡" (JC ts, ED as, MT p, RW b, EJ d)		November 1, 1961	18:45
2.	"Chasin' Another Trane‡‡" (JC ts, ED as, RW b, RH d)		November 2, 1961	15:35
3.	"India‡‡‡" (JC ss, ED bc, MT p, JG b, RW b, EJ d, AA ou, GB ob)		November 2, 1961	13:14
4.	"Spiritual‡‡‡" (JC ss ts, ED bc, MT p, RW b, EJ d, GB c-bs)		November 2, 1961	15:13
5.	"Softly, As in a Morning Sunrise†" (JC ss, MT p, RW b, EJ d)	Sigmund Romberg, Oscar Hammerstein II	November 2, 1961	6:38

=== Disc three ===
No.	Title	Writer(s)	Recording date	Length
1.	"Chasin' the Trane†" (JC ts, JG b, EJ d)		November 2, 1961	16:08
2.	"Greensleeves‡" (JC ss, MT p, RW b, EJ d)	traditional	November 2, 1961	6:51
3.	"Impressions‡‡" (JC ts, ED as, MT p, JG b, EJ d)		November 2, 1961	10:59
4.	"Spiritual†" (JC ts ss, ED bc, MT p, RW b, EJ d)		November 3, 1961	13:48
5.	"Naima" (JC ts, ED bc, MT p, RW b, EJ d)		November 3, 1961	7:07
6.	"Impressions††" (JC ts, MT p, JG b, EJ d)		November 3, 1961	14:52

=== Disc four ===
No.	Title	Writer(s)	Recording date	Length
1.	"India††" (JC ss, ED bc, MT p, JG b, RW b, EJ d)		November 3, 1961	14:03
2.	"Greensleeves‡‡" (JC ss, MT p, RW b, EJ d)	traditional	November 3, 1961	5:02
3.	"Miles' Mode" (JC ts, ED as, MT p, JG b, RW b, EJ d)		November 3, 1961	15:25
4.	"India‡" (JC ss, ED bc, MT p, JG b, RW b, EJ d, AA ou, GB ob)		November 5, 1961	15:14
5.	"Spiritual‡" (JC ts ss, ED bc, MT p, RW b, EJ d, GB c-bs)		November 5, 1961	20:40

=== 1998 Live at the Village Vanguard: The Master Takes ===
No.	Title	Writer(s)	Recording date	Length
1.	"Spiritual†" (JC ts ss, ED bc, MT p, RW b, EJ d)		November 3, 1961	13:31
2.	"Softly, As in a Morning Sunrise†" (JC ss, MT p, RW b, EJ d)	Romberg, Hammerstein	November 2, 1961	6:25
3.	"Chasin' the Trane†" (JC ts, JG b, EJ d)		November 2, 1961	15:55
4.	"India††" (JC ss, ED bc, MT p, JG b, RW b, EJ d)		November 3, 1961	13:55
5.	"Impressions††" (JC ts, MT p, JG b, EJ d)		November 3, 1961	14:45

† Originally issued in 1962 as Live at the Village Vanguard; †† originally issued in 1963 on Impressions
‡ Originally issued in 1977 as The Other Village Vanguard Tapes; ‡‡ originally issued in 1979 on Trane's Modes; ‡‡‡ originally issued in 1985 on From the Original Master Tapes

== Personnel ==
- John Coltrane — soprano and tenor saxophone
- Eric Dolphy — bass clarinet, alto saxophone
- McCoy Tyner — piano
- Reggie Workman - bass
- Jimmy Garrison - bass
- Elvin Jones — drums
- Roy Haynes — drums
- Garvin Bushell — probably cor anglais (described wrongly in the disc notes as an oboe), contrabassoon
- Ahmed Abdul-Malik — probably tampura (described wrongly in the disc notes as an oud)
