= The Mastery of John Coltrane / Vol. IV: Trane's Modes =

Compilation album by John Coltrane
- Released: 1979
- Recorded: May 23, 1961 (#7–8); Van Gelder Studio, Englewood Cliffs; November 1, 1961 (#1–2, 6); November 2, 1961 (#3, 5); November 3, 1961 (#4); Village Vanguard, New York City
- Genre: Jazz
- Length: 79:32
- Label: Impulse! IZ 9361/2
- Producer: Bob Thiele

John Coltrane chronology
The Mastery of John Coltrane / Vol. III: Jupiter Variation (1978)	The Mastery of John Coltrane / Vol. IV: Trane's Modes (1979)	Coltrane/Dolphy (1980)

The Mastery of John Coltrane / Vol. IV: Trane's Modes is a double compilation album by American saxophonist John Coltrane, released as a double LP in 1979. It features pieces recorded in 1961, two in studio and the remainder live.

== Release history ==
All the tracks were previously unissued, at the time of release. At present, "Africa (First Version)" and "The Damned Don't Cry" may be found on the two-disc reissue of Africa/Brass, while all the live pieces have been included on The Complete 1961 Village Vanguard Recordings.

== Reception ==
Professional ratings
Review scores
Source	Rating
AllMusic	4.5/5 stars
The Rolling Stone Jazz Record Guide	5/5 stars

In a review for AllMusic, Scott Yanow wrote: "this two-LP set will be well worth searching for. These six performances from the Vanguard do not duplicate any other recordings. There are two more runthroughs on 'Impressions,' a 15-minute 'Chasin' Another Trane,' 'Greensleeves,' 'Miles' Mode' and a strange version of 'Naima' in which Coltrane purposely plays the melody sideways... This two-fer is rounded out by two previously unissued performances... from the Africa/Brass sessions in which Coltrane is backed by a medium-size orchestra for some stirring music."

== Track listing ==
Side 1
No.	Title	Date recorded	Length
1.	"Impressions" (Take 1)	November 1, 1961	8:50
2.	"Miles' Mode"	November 1, 1961	10:00

Side 2
No.	Title	Date recorded	Length
1.	"Chasin' Another Trane"	November 2, 1961	15:34
2.	"Greensleeves" (Take 2)	November 3, 1961	4:50

Side 3
No.	Title	Date recorded	Length
1.	"Impressions" (Take 2)	November 2, 1961	10:55
2.	"Naima"	November 1, 1961	7:39

Side 4
No.	Title	Date recorded	Length
1.	"Africa" (First Version)	May 23, 1961	14:06
2.	"The Damned Don't Cry"	May 23, 1961	7:38

- Sides 1–3 recorded live November 1961 at the Village Vanguard
- Side 4 recorded May 23, 1961 at Van Gelder Studio

== Personnel ==
=== May 23, 1961 ===
- John Coltrane – tenor and soprano saxophone
- Eric Dolphy – alto saxophone, Reeds
- Booker Little, Freddie Hubbard – trumpet
- Donald Corrado , Jimmy Buffington, Julius Watkins – French horn
- Charles Greenlee, Julian Priester – euphonium
- Garvin Bushell, Pat Patrick – Reeds
- McCoy Tyner – piano
- Paul Chambers – bass
- Elvin Jones – drums

=== November, 1961 ===
- John Coltrane – tenor saxophone, soprano saxophone
- Eric Dolphy – alto saxophone, reeds
- McCoy Tyner – piano
- Jimmy Garrison (1–2, 5), Reggie Workman (3–4, 6–8) – bass
- Elvin Jones – drums
