= A Camel's Kiss =

Studio album by Tristan Honsinger
- Released: 2000
- Recorded: December 2 and 21, 1999
- Studios: Plantage Doklaan, Amsterdam
- Genre: Jazz
- Length: 52:53
- Labels: Instant Composers Pool; ICP 036

A Camel's Kiss is a solo cello album by Tristan Honsinger. It was recorded in December 1999 at Plantage Doklaan, Amsterdam, and was released by Instant Composers Pool in 2000.

When asked about the title of the album, Honsinger replied: "I had an experience with a llama one time. It was tied up outside the City Hall of Marseille and the funny thing was that these business people had to go past the llama to get into the City Hall. They were all dressed with suits and briefcases and they all had to look at the llama and their reactions were – I never laughed so hard in my life. I thought, yeah, it's a little bit like a camel, like kissing a camel." When asked why he didn't name the album A Llama's Kiss, Honsinger responded: "Aahh, because I like the word camel."

== Reception ==
Professional ratings
Review scores
| Source | Rating |
|---|---|
| AllMusic | 4/5 stars |
| The Penguin Guide to Jazz | 4/4 stars |

In a review for AllMusic, Dean McFarlane wrote: "This CD... finds... Honsinger... performing as he does best a style of fractured but highly emotive avant-garde cello. His vocalizing in improvisation is a kind of subconscious moan that is charming and somewhat frightening to hear over the squalls of cello lyricism. He lets the instrument do the talking, in that his vocalizing is vague tonal accompaniment to his virtuoso string flurries. His performance is flippant, but by no stretch is it slapstick; his improvising is highly developed, and... he is captured in crystal-clear fidelity, and his performance is evocative of jazz, classical, folk, and avant-garde idioms, fields that he draws inspiration from then transmutes into his own unique instrumental language... This recording captures all of the evocative emotional weight that a cello recital carries, but is lively and upbeat while simultaneously melancholic and introspective. It is the speed with which the performer can transform from these emotions which highlights his virtuosity on the instrument."

The authors of The Penguin Guide to Jazz awarded the album 4 stars, calling it "superb," and stating that it "sees Honsinger negotiate the entire range of his musical heritage, from Bach-like solo sonatas to Berliner Ensemble cabaret songs to free-form improvisations which camouflage a strong inner structure. It's a completely exhilarating 50-odd minutes of music, with not a dull spot. It's also beautifully recorded, bringing out the resonant woodiness of the cello, as well as its percussive potential and its ability to set off ringing harmonics in the space around the performer."

== Track listing ==
All compositions by Tristan Honsinger.

1. "Squitty Geshee" – 1:58
2. "Stopera" – 11:42
3. "Mary Contrairy" – 3:00
4. "Go East" – 5:03
5. "A Camel's Kiss" – 8:48
6. "Waves" – 1:20
7. "From Time to Time Suite" – 7:33
8. "Restless in Pieces" – 12:45

== Personnel ==
- Tristan Honsinger – cello, voice
