= Lifting the Bandstand =

Live album by Cecil Taylor
- Released: 2021
- Recorded: October 30, 1998
- Venue: Tampere Jazz Happening, Tampere, Finland
- Genre: jazz
- Length: 1:15:33
- Label: Fundacja Słuchaj! FSR 01 2021
- Producer: Veli-Pekka Heinonen

Lifting the Bandstand is a live album by Cecil Taylor recorded during the Tampere Jazz Happening in Tampere, Finland, on October 30, 1998, and released in 2021 by Fundacja Słuchaj!. On the album, Taylor is joined by saxophonist Harri Sjöström, cellist Tristan Honsinger, bassist Teppo Hauta-aho, and drummer Paul Lovens. The album consists of a single group improvisation.

The album title comes from a phrase attributed to Thelonious Monk. According to Steve Lacy, who played with both Monk and Taylor, Monk would tell his musicians "Let's lift the bandstand." Lacy recalled: "That's magic, man, when the bandstand levitates. I didn't know how to do it but I knew what he was talking about. Old dreams but they're still valid." After the concert at which the album was recorded, Lacy, who was in attendance, went backstage and remarked "You guys really lifted the bandstand," thus inadvertently providing the title of the disc. (Lift the Bandstand is also the name of a video documentary about Lacy.)

== Reception ==
Professional ratings
Review scores
Source	Rating
All About Jazz	4/5 stars
The Free Jazz Collective	4/5 stars

In a review for All About Jazz, Mark Corroto wrote: "The Tampere concert begins with vocalizations from Taylor and Honsinger before the quintet detonates into some energetic improvisations. The sound never devolves into the chaos of din as pieces and parts flow to the surface and connect. After the exuberance of the opening—as well as the body of this concert, the final fifteen minutes evolve into the spoils. Poetry and operatic phrasings emerge, not from exhaustion but resolution. While this is indeed a Cecil Taylor recording, it was created not from intensive rehearsals and practice, nor was it preplanned. The quintet lifts the bandstand with all hands on deck."

Writing for Dusted Magazine, Derek Taylor commented: "Absent are any of Taylor's elaborate preparatory charts or schematics. Missing, too, are the crucibles of his exhaustive and demanding rehearsals. Instead, it's simply five men taking the stage with the semblance of a clean slate between them. Taylor's vocalizations and the diffused contributions of his colleagues occupy the opening minutes. Ritual must be invoked and observed... once Taylor plants himself firmly at the piano stool flanked by scraping strings, the music turns into a turbulent, extended series of cloudbursts. Figurative thunder, lightning and torrential rain all leap to mind in the glorious tempest that follows... Dancing about architecture seems an actual equivalent when attaching written description to records like this one. Better to abandon language altogether and just let the music speak."

In an article for Point of Departure, Stuart Broomer stated: "Lovens is a different presence than Taylor's diverse American drumming partners: his drums sound essentially loose and thick with a bright metal tumult above, the combination mysteriously emphasizing a special relationship. Taylor and Lovens merge into a compound voice, a kind of unitary assemblage, while at the same time creating complex rhythms with a disruptive, fractured quality... there's an episode of Honsinger bowing and Hauta-Aho playing pizzicato when the two seem to merge into a single bass-baritone string instrument. There are stunning passages with Sjöström peppering notes into Taylor's cascading runs, punctuating them and pointing out how appropriate the soprano is to Taylor's music and why Jimmy Lyons had always worked his alto’s upper register so effectively. There are also times when the density thins to high-speed whispers, but while Taylor is active there remains that sense of the atom smasher, the point at which music becomes physics, all the tones multiplying and extending out towards infinity."

Stephen Griffith of The Free Jazz Collective remarked: "The interplay among all the subgroups is never less than interesting as Taylor emphasizes the importance of having distinctly individual approaches as being key to group success... This recording does more than just fill in a previous vacuum; it adds a new chapter. Listeners interested in learning about the full scope of his music are advised to partake of this."

== Track listing ==
1. "Desperados" – 1:15:33
- Recorded live during the Tampere Jazz Happening in Tampere, Finland, on October 30, 1998.

== Personnel ==
- Cecil Taylor – piano
- Harri Sjöström – soprano saxophone
- Tristan Honsinger – cello
- Teppo Hauta-aho – bass
- Paul Lovens – drums
