= Interstellar Space =

Studio album by John Coltrane
- Released: September 1974
- Recorded: February 22, 1967
- Studio: Van Gelder (Englewood Cliffs)
- Genre: Free jazz
- Length: 36:27
- Label: Impulse!
- Producer: John Coltrane

John Coltrane chronology
Concert in Japan (1973)	Interstellar Space (1974)	The Africa/Brass Sessions, Volume 2 (1974)

Interstellar Space is a studio album by the American jazz saxophonist John Coltrane, featuring the drummer Rashied Ali. It was recorded in 1967, the year of his death, and released by Impulse! Records in September 1974.

== Composition ==
Piano and bass were becoming residual by the last days of Coltrane's quartet; you braced yourself for the moment he abandoned any pretext of an underlying harmony and went mano a mano with Elvin Jones. These duets with Rashied Ali start there—and the spare compositional guidelines only up the intensity.

— Francis Davis, The Village Voice

Interstellar Space consists of an extended duet suite in four parts with the drummer Rashied Ali, and was recorded at the Van Gelder Studio on February 22, 1967, one week after the session that produced Stellar Regions (which included the track "Offering", also featured on the album Expression), and roughly two weeks before the session that produced the tracks "Ogunde" and "Number One", both of which also appeared on Expression. There is some overlap between the material on Stellar Regions and Interstellar Space; for example, "Venus" has the same melody as the title track of Stellar Regions, while "Mars" quotes the melody of what became known as "Iris", and many note choices and runs are similar.

The original album featured four tracks: "Mars" (titled "C Major" in the ABC/Paramount session sheets), "Venus" (titled "Dream Chant" in the session sheets), "Jupiter", and "Saturn". Two further tracks from the session, "Leo" and "Jupiter Variation", later appeared on the compilation album Jupiter Variation in 1978. A 2000 CD reissue collected all of the tracks from the session, including false starts for "Jupiter Variation" in the CD's pregap.

According to Ben Ratliff, Interstellar Space was "minimally planned", and "happened on what seemed for Ali to be a routine visit to Rudy Van Gelder's studio. Ali arrived with his friend Jimmy Vass, expecting to find the other band members, and saw no one else there." Ratliff related the following exchange:

"Ain't nobody coming?" [Ali] said to Vass. Soon Coltrane arrived. / "Ain't nobody coming?" he said to Coltrane. / "No, it's just you and me." / "What are we playing? Is it fast? Is it slow?" / "Whatever you want it to be. Come on. I'm going to ring some bells. You can do an 8-bar intro."

Ratliff wrote that "They cut the record in one take. Ali says he wasn't completely at ease, that the whole thing brought him up short. He still feels he could have done better if he had been prepared." Later, Ali reflected: "You can just about tell what that music was headed for — he had a handle on it. It really told you the direction he was headed in. That record [Interstellar Space] was one of the last things that he did. It's really something that has to be listened to and something that has to be felt. Musicians are just starting to look into the playing of this kind of a thing now."

== Release and reception ==
Professional ratings
Review scores
Source	Rating
AllMusic	4/5 stars
Down Beat	4/5 stars
The Penguin Guide to Jazz	4/4 stars
The Rolling Stone Record Guide	4/5 stars
Sputnikmusic	4/5
Tom Hull	A−
The Village Voice	A−

Interstellar Space was released in September 1974 by Impulse! Records. In a contemporary review for Rolling Stone, music journalist Stephen Davis called the album "plainly astounding" and found Ali to be the ideal complement for Coltrane's mystical ideas: "He outlandishly returns the unrelenting outpour of energy spewing from Trane, and the result is a two-man vulcanism in which Ali provides the subterranean rumblings through which the tenor explodes in showers of notes." Robert Christgau wrote in his column for The Village Voice that he was amazed by the duets, which "sound like an annoyance until you concentrate on them, at which point the interactions take on pace and shape, with metaphorical overtones that have little to do with the musical ideas being explored."

In a review of Interstellar Space's expanded CD reissue, jazz critic Scott Yanow from AllMusic deemed it "rousing if somewhat inaccessible music" with transformative, emotional duets that showcase Coltrane's flair for improvising without a traditional jazz accompaniment. Tiny Mix Tapes wrote that the "fierce free-jazz rumination" is not as important as his other albums Giant Steps (1960) and A Love Supreme (1965), but it better encapsulates Coltrane's spiritual and stylistic growth, including his understanding and grasp of multiphonic techniques, overtone sounds, and altissimo notes. According to Down Beat magazine, Interstellar Space best exemplified the formal principles Coltrane applied to his more spiritual music, while Derek Taylor from All About Jazz called it one of his most important recordings, distinct from previous duets he recorded with the likes of Elvin Jones:

In Ali he found a drummer even more willing to abandon terrestrial rhythmic boundaries and set course for uncharted space. Across these duets the saxophonist is at his most visceral exuding an overpowering confidence tempered at times with sacrosanct tenderness. Ali's interlocking pan-rhythmic patterns envelop and embrace while fervently pushing the music forward.

Ben Ratliff described the album as follows: "Coltrane directs the music, beginning and ending at a place of calm, even though the music reaches frenetic states in between. It isn't show business, even hippie show business. It's an almost monastic record. Each piece begins and ends with bells, shaken by Coltrane. The pieces encompass a range of expression, from hard, fragmentary phrases to flowing, downward twelve-note scales, played so fast and articulated so clearly they give you the physical sensation of the floor dropping out from under you. This takes him back to 1958, when he started to become interested in the harp, expressing himself with fast arpeggios; it is sheets-of-sound done even better."

Eric Nisenson wrote that the title Interstellar Space "is perfectly fitting, for here Coltrane is free to improvise without the gravity of the bass or piano. The names of the pieces, 'Mars,' 'Jupiter,' 'Venus,' and 'Saturn,' reflect Coltrane's interest in astrology, which he valued as a complex system for relating the flow of the cosmos to human actions. The music embodies an idea he had gleaned from his study of Einstein and modern physics: that the universe was constantly expanding. Melody and rhythm, free from the constraints of harmony and meter, create a light show for the mind; one can see stars exploding, comets shooting through the vastness of space, the ceaseless, neverending expansive motion of all the stars and planets... These saxophone-drums duets are in the tradition of such Coltrane works as 'Countdown' and 'Vigil.' The difference is the great freedom of Rashied Ali's rhythms, which allow Coltrane liberty to explore this rhythmic landscape without being compelled forward... Coltrane's dense, frenetic playing is at times reminiscent of the 'sheets of sound' period, with the same effect on the listener of being bathed in pure sound. But the differences with the former music are far more important. Coltrane had made deep inroads into the terrain of pure musical freedom, and while maintaining important elements of his established style, he seems freed from standard Western musical theory. Moreover, he discovered in this recording that he did not have to continue screaming in order to continue his quest."

Lewis Porter's book John Coltrane: His Life and Music includes a detailed discussion of Interstellar Space, and specifically "Venus." He wrote: "The barrage of sound presented by Coltrane's last works may, unfortunately, conceal from many listeners the magnificent power of Coltrane's playing. What seems to be chaotic is just the opposite. Coltrane managed to create long solos that flowed seamlessly from theme to improvisation - which is just what he said he wanted. And the improvisations were devoted relentlessly to the exploration of abstract motivic ideas." Porter suggested that Interstellar Space is "an ideal starting place for the listener who wants to understand Coltrane's last music - it's so easy to hear what he's doing... Each [piece] begins with a theme, moves away from it, and returns to it at the end... all of the pieces encompass some kind of working up to a climax followed by a calming down, which leads to a recapitulation." He goes on to list three techniques that Coltrane employs in this recording: 1) "very fast descending scales, repeated over and over" in an attempt "to create an orchestral effect... He wants to give the listener an impression that the top notes are the melody, and the scales are the accompaniment;" 2) "rapid and extreme changes in register," an "attempt to suggest two lines of activity at once;" 3) "'right-side up and upside-down' - creating variations of a motive by changing its shape, going up instead of down, using the same rhythm or the same number of notes in different ways." Porter notes that as "Coltrane moves into longer and faster streams of notes, more abstruse and less clearly articulated," "patterns emerge" and "we begin to realize that what, at first hearing, may have seemed to be an undisciplined proliferation of notes is actually an elaboration of various patterns." Porter concludes his discussion of "Venus" by noting: "For someone who was accused of playing loud, noisy music during his last years, what impresses most is his incredible control of dynamics, from a whisper to a holler... And Coltrane has succeeded precisely because he gave up chord changes and the restriction of a steady beat, in creating a seamless musical construction, not divisible into choruses."

Author Tony Whyton wrote that the tracks on Interstellar Space "clearly demonstrate the full glory of Coltrane’s late style" and notes that "the removal of identifiable structures, a steady pulse, and clear sense of meter opens up the music and removes familiar aids of orientation for the listener. In this respect, although Coltrane's sound and approach can be understood as part of the same continuum, the context has changed dramatically to the point where the music is clearly experienced more as an immediate sensation. This leads to recordings such as Interstellar Space being received as musical processes rather than as products; they encourage us to listen in the here and now as opposed to assimilating what has happened before and predicting what will happen next." Whyton suggests that "Experiencing a recording as a type of music as process counters the canonical imperative of reifying music; Coltrane's music does not convey a singular meaning or set of values but works as an agent for questioning and opening up the discourse about what music could be. In Coltrane's world at this time, the studio becomes a site for investigation and discovery, and the duets with Ali convey a clear sense of experimentation and interplay between two creative artists." He also states: "there is a definite sense that notation alone cannot capture the intensity, energy, and sound encountered when listening to the recording firsthand.... As a sonic experience, Interstellar Space has a rich, sensual quality that clearly explains Coltrane's fascination with sound. More than any other late Coltrane recording, Interstellar Space draws the listener in with its sensuous sounds and demonstrates the way in which recordings can open our ears to different listening experiences."

Mika Vainio of the band Pan Sonic listed Interstellar Space as one of his favorite albums in an interview with The Quietus. Zach Graham, writing for GQ, called it "Coltrane's most tenacious and inaccessible album" and claimed it was Coltrane's most influential record citing Thundercat and Kendrick Lamar as musicians influenced by Interstellar Space.

== Covers ==
In 1999, guitarist Nels Cline and drummer Gregg Bendian released their versions of "Mars", "Leo", "Venus", "Jupiter" and "Saturn" on the album Interstellar Space Revisited: The Music of John Coltrane. Rings of Saturn, an album by duets by Rashied Ali and saxophonist Louie Belogenis, also pays tribute to Interstellar Space, and includes the Coltrane composition "Saturn".

== Track listing ==
All tracks are written by John Coltrane.

Side one
No.	Title	Length
1.	"Mars"	10:43
2.	"Venus"	8:36

Side two
No.	Title	Length
1.	"Jupiter"	5:25
2.	"Saturn"	11:43

- Sides one and two were combined as tracks 1–4 on CD reissues.

CD bonus tracks
No.	Title	Length
5.	"Leo"	10:56
6.	"Jupiter Variation"	6:43

== Personnel ==
- John Coltrane – tenor saxophone, bells
- Rashied Ali – drums
