= Ogunde (song) =

Composition by John Coltrane

from the album Expression
- Released: 1967
- Recorded: 1967
- Genre: Free jazz
- Length: 3:36
- Label: Impulse!
- Composer: John Coltrane

"Ogunde" is the opening track on jazz saxophonist John Coltrane's 1967 album Expression, and one of two songs on The Olatunji Concert: The Last Live Recording.

== Origins and composition ==
"Ogunde" is the opening track on Expression, Coltrane's final studio album, recorded on February 15 and March 7, 1967. At 3:36 minutes, it is the shortest song on the album. A "marathon version" of the song that lasted for more than 28 minutes was performed in concert on April 23, 1967 during Coltrane's last recorded live performance in the Olatunji Center for African Culture in Harlem and was released in 2001 on The Olatunji Concert: The Last Live Recording.

The original release of "Ogunde" features Coltrane on tenor, Rashied Ali on drums, Alice Coltrane on piano, and Jimmy Garrison on bass. The Olatunji Concert release also features percussionists Juma Santos and Algie de Witt and saxophonist Pharoah Sanders, who makes a single appearance in Expression on "To Be", on piccolo flute.

According to David Wild's liner notes, the song is based on "Ogunde Varere", an Afro-Brazilian folk song whose title translates to 'Prayer of the Gods'. Independent journalist and author Gérald Arnaud further noted that "Ogunde" is dedicated to the Orisha Ogun, the god of iron and of metal in the Yoruba religious tradition. Meanwhile, Chris Searle of The Morning Star contended that the song "re-emphasises Coltrane's amalgam of spiritual passion within the huge sound of his solidarity with the African people".

== Music and structure ==
"Ogunde" is a free jazz ballad; however, literary historian Kimberly Benston notes that the song deviates from the traditional "expectations of closure aroused by the underlying ballad structure". Jeff Pressing of the University of Melbourne notes "Ogunde" as an example of a song that "juxtapose[s] lyrical directness with eruptions of broken quasi-atonality".

PopMatters reviewer James Beaudreau further notes that Coltrane's performance in "Ogunde" reflects the personal style that he evolved prior to his death: "ecstatic, brightly focused, and with a kaleidoscopic vibrato". According to Beaudreau, the starting phrase of "Ogunde", which features Coltrane, "sounds like an ending, as if the whole of the music could be summed up in a single noble cadence". The song is characterized by a sequence that features multiple performers and sounds and includes a fourteen-minute period, starting at 2:40, for which Coltrane is completely absent, and which is dominated by the sounds of Sanders' saxophone and Alice Coltrane's piano, as well as lengthy solos by Coltrane, Sanders, and Alice.

When Sanders finally relents at about 10:00, Alice Coltrane’s piano comes to the fore ... . Her sound is quick and colorful, intelligent and playful. When Coltrane returns at 16:40 and hovers around the same scale for a minute, the result is like the sun breaking out after a storm. His extraordinary solo builds majestically through the restatement of the theme at 25 minutes and a coda startling for its power and inventiveness. His last phrase sounds electrified—something like Jimi Hendrix might have played, but with a depth of the darkest blue and technique that in earlier times might have been thought diabolical.

— James Beaudreau

== Reception ==
On the whole, "Ogunde" was well received by critics. Discussing Coltrane's music in the months prior to his death in July 1967, jazz musician and educator Bill Cole noted that although Coltrane's "recording output during 1967 ... was sparse," the "quality and strength, especially on his piece 'Ogunde', show no detrimental effects from his illness." Jazz commentator Scott Yanow praised The Olatunji Concert for its "unremittingly intense music", but called it "largely unlistenable except by true fanatics" due to poor recording quality, stating that the recording "should have remained legendary and unissued".

BBC reviewer Peter Marsh characterized Coltrane's solo performance during the song as "a gripping, restless examination of repeated phrases, accelerated at dizzying speed till they break up and regroup" and describes the performance as one having both "power and grace".

Many reviews of "Ogunde" give special attention to Sanders' performance in the extended version of the song. Don Heckman of the Los Angeles Times praised Sanders' performance, asserting that "Sanders is at his very best on 'Ogunde'". Beaudreau offered a mixed assessment, finding "Sanders’ endurance" to be "impressive" and his performance "attractive and admirable", but noting that the performance tests his "tolerance for extended and insistent shrill wailing" and that "the lack of warmth here leaves me out in the cold, so to speak".

== Appearances ==
In addition to Expression and Olatunji Concert, versions of "Ogunde" have been featured on several other albums, including His Greatest Years, Vol. 2: The Best of John Coltrane (MCA, 1990), Spiritual (Impulse!, 2001), and The Impulse Story (Impulse!, 2006). The song is also featured in Sacred Sources, Vol. 1: Live Forever, a compilation album released in 1994 by Carlos Santana's record label Guts & Grace that features recordings from the final performances of famous artists. A short excerpt of "Ogunde" also appears on The Last Giant: Anthology, a 1993 release by Rhino Records.

Album	Released	Label	Length
His Greatest Years, Vol. 2: The Best of John Coltrane	1990	MCA Records	3:40
The Last Giant: Anthology	1993	Rhino Records	1:30
Sacred Sources, Vol. 1: Live Forever	1994	Guts & Grace	5:27
Spiritual	2001	Impulse! Records	3:38
The Impulse Story	2006	Impulse! Records	3:36

"Ogunde" was one of fifteen compositions performed in 2003 at Mechanics Hall in Worcester, Massachusetts for the 26th Annual John Coltrane Memorial Concert.
