= The Light of Corona =

Live album by Cecil Taylor
- Released: 2003
- Recorded: November 3, 1996
- Venue: Podewil, Berlin
- Genre: Jazz
- Length: 1:15:27
- Label: FMP
- Producer: Jost Gebers

The Light of Corona is a live album by Cecil Taylor recorded during the "Total Music Meeting" at the "Podewil", the headquarters of the Kulturprojekte Berlin non-profit organisation, on November 3, 1996, and released in 2003 on the FMP label. The album features Taylor with eight other musicians, and is a recording of two sections of a piece with a total duration of over an hour. The same group recorded the album Almeda the previous day.

In the album liner notes, Volker Spicker wrote: "This concert reorganised your own consciousness, took you to spheres previously unknown, took unexpected turns, concentrating on the essential things, on the living, showed the meaning of being free and creative, of being alive. The music simply mirrored the infinite processes taking place within each of us and around us at the same time, processes which equal life, inspiring sensitivity and attentiveness... The precondition is being prepared to let go of expectations, the well-known, to let yourself go... How inspiring and joyful playing together is, how full of energy and how peaceful, how intense change is, how breathtaking and different from what one thinks. How relationships are interwoven, how little is needed as framework or form for united creative activity."

== Reception ==
Professional ratings
Review scores
Source	Rating
AllMusic	3/5 stars

In his AllMusic review, François Couture wrote: "The first piece... begins very quietly, the musicians coming on stage and starting to play one at a time, all improvising poetry and vocalizing along the way. It ends in a similar fashion, helping the listener to come down from his or her cloud after a stunning number in which Taylor plays the roles of both inducer and controller of chaos. The musicians stretch the concept of synergy to new lengths and the whole piece finds its momentum in the dichotomy between chaos and order, between individual ideas and collective coherence. At the piano, Taylor is equal to his usual self and very gracious in sharing the stage with so many musicians. After the first piece, he sits down and solos for about 5 minutes..., after which Duval joins him, followed by the others. In this piece though the piano remains the center of attention, until the whole group breaks into a vocalized coda. Jonas or Sjöström... contributes a gripping solo before that."

Writing for JazzWord, Ken Waxman commented: "The overriding impression you're left with... is how Taylor's seeming omnipotent power can bend any group of musicians to his will. Also, as with nearly every Taylor production over the past 40 years, the organization and output of the music on the CD are more singular than what you'd find in any other airing by a nine-piece band... Despite the apparent cacophony, every player appears to have his designated part down, and if you listen carefully, you'll hear each negotiating a particular way through the thicket of mostly cello-bass onslaught."

== Track listing ==
All compositions by Cecil Taylor

1. "One" – 52:33
2. "Two" – 22:52
- Recorded live during the Total Music Meeting on November 3, 1996, at the Podewil in Berlin.

== Personnel ==
- Cecil Taylor - piano
- Harri Sjöström - soprano saxophone
- Chris Jonas - soprano saxophone, alto saxophone
- Elliot Levin - tenor saxophone, flute
- Chris Matthay - trumpet
- Jeff Hoyer - trombone
- Tristan Honsinger - cello
- Dominic Duval - bass
- Jackson Krall - drums
