= Tobias Delius =

British-German saxophonist and clarinetist

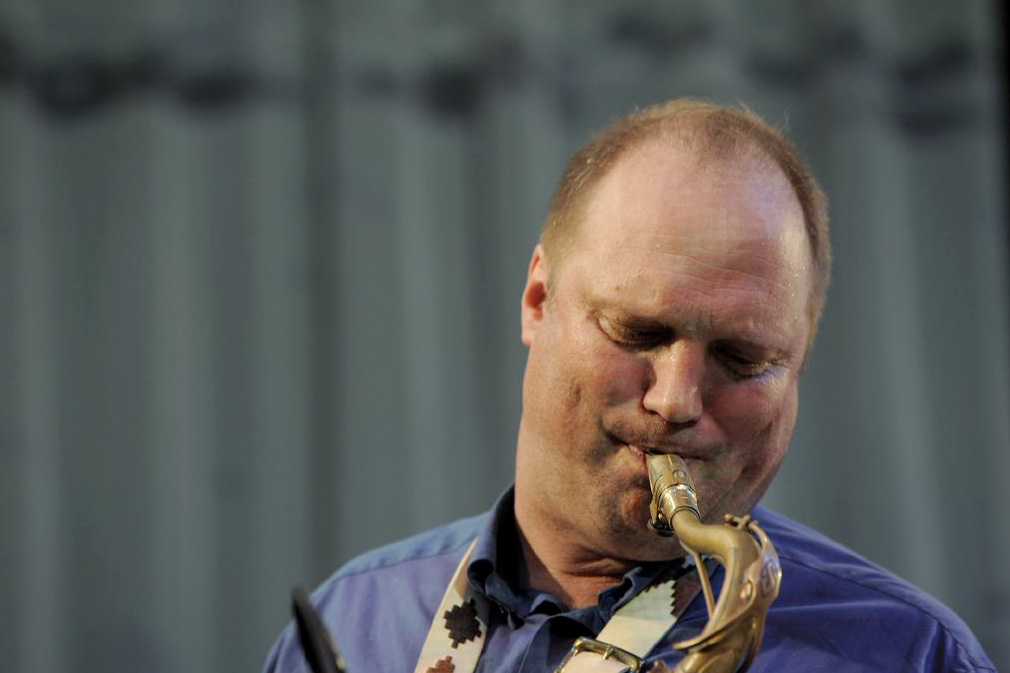
Tobias Delius, Moers Festival, 2010

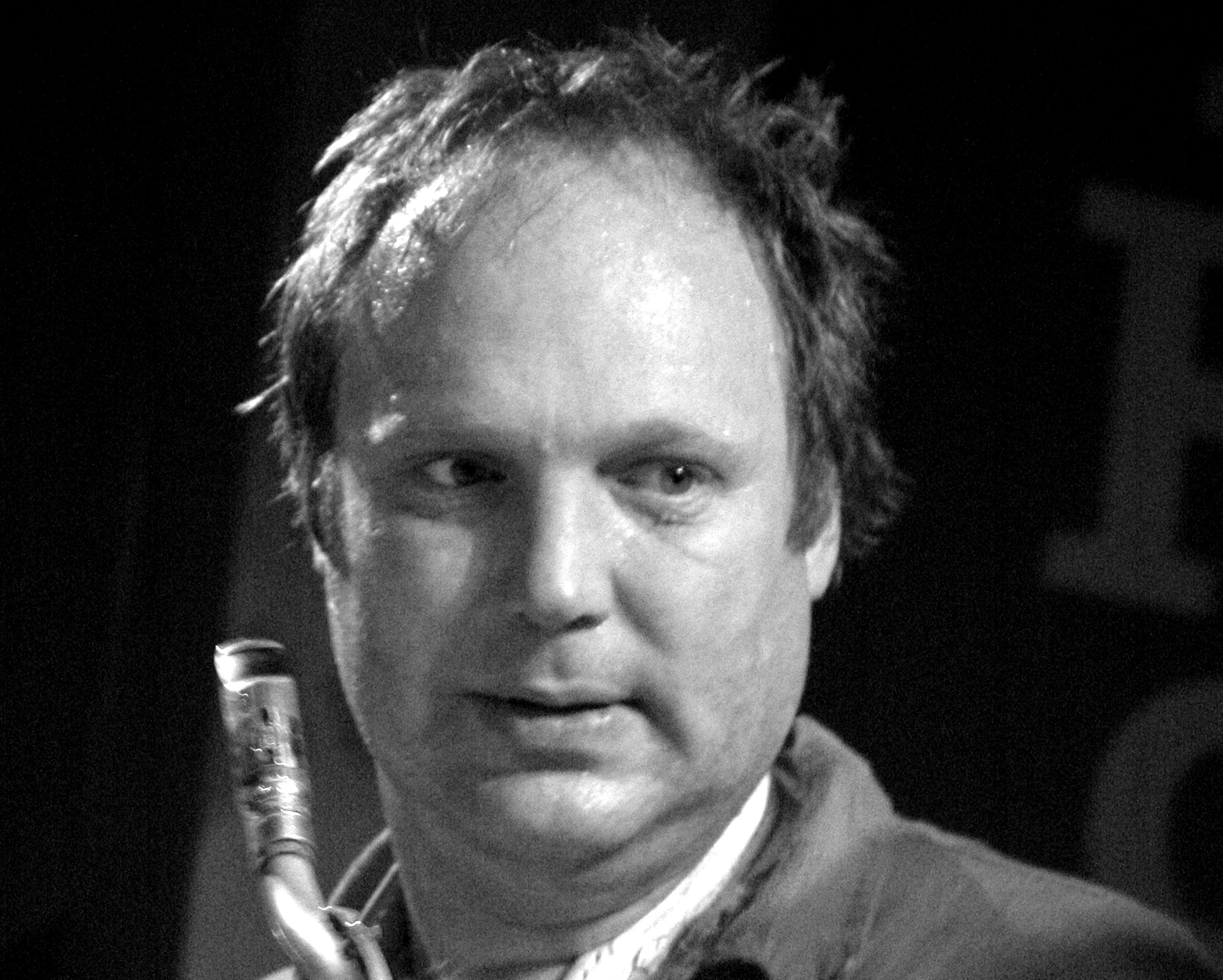
Tobias Delius photo courtesy Seth Tisue

Tobias Delius (born 15 July 1964) is a British/German tenor saxophonist and clarinettist.

== Early life ==
Delius was born in Oxford, England, on 15 July 1964. His mother was German and his father was Argentine. Delius was brought up largely in England and Germany. He switched from clarinet to tenor saxophone at the age of sixteen, and played with local bands.

== Later life and career ==
Delius played in Mexico for eight months before joining the Sweelinck Conservatory in Amsterdam in 1984. He did not complete his studies there, which included lessons with Misha Mengelberg and Paul Stocker, but developed his reputation with improvisers in the area. He joined Available Jelly in 1989, Trio San Francisco and other bands that included Daniele D'Agaro and Sean Bergin in 1992, and toured with Louis Moholo in 1992–93. He also co-founded a quartet with Han Bennink, Larry Fishkind and Tristan Honsinger in 1990. Fishkind was later replaced by Joe Williamson in this band, which employs a "method of improvising suites utilizing written themes introduced democratically by any member".

Delius was awarded the 2003 VPRO/Boy Edgar Award. In 2023, his duo with Christian Lillinger received the Instant Award in Improvised Music along with Tristan Honsinger. In 2025, he was awarded the 2025 Jazzpreis Berlin.

== Playing style ==
Grove wrote: "Delius produces a sumptuous timbre reminiscent of Coleman Hawkins and Ben Webster, which he combines with a decidedly modern and slippery harmonic and rhythmic conception. He phrases over bar-lines as his harmonic extensions blur the edges of chord changes, and he uses varied dynamics to dramatic effect. He is a consistently deft improviser in both traditional and free settings."
