= Frank Kofsky =

American historian (1935–1997)

Frank Kofsky (1935–1997) was an American Marxist historian, author, and Professor of History at California State University, Sacramento, from 1969 until his death. A musician himself, Kofsky also wrote several books on jazz, mainly concentrating on the avant-garde of the 1960s and the relationship between musicians and the industry on which they depend.

In the liner notes for the Impulse! release of The John Coltrane Quartet Plays (A(S)-85; 1965), Kofsky gives an analysis on the transition from bop to the avant garde as it relates to Coltrane's career.

== Works ==
- Black Nationalism and the Revolution in Music (1971); expanded and revised as John Coltrane and the Jazz Revolution of the 1960s (Pathfinder Press, 1998). ISBN 978-0-87348-857-0
- Lenny Bruce: The Comedian as Social Critic and Secular Moralist (Monad Press, distributed by Pathfinder Press, 1974). ISBN 978-0-913460-32-0
- Harry S. Truman and the War Scare of 1948: A Successful Campaign to Deceive the Nation (1993: Palgrave Macmillan, 1995). ISBN 978-0-312-12329-1
- Black Music, White Business: Illuminating the History and Political Economy of Jazz (Pathfinder Press, 1998). ISBN 978-0-87348-859-4

=== Article ===
- "The State of Jazz", "Black Perspectives in Music," 1977.
