= Teppo Hauta-aho =

Finnish double bassist and composer (1941–2021)

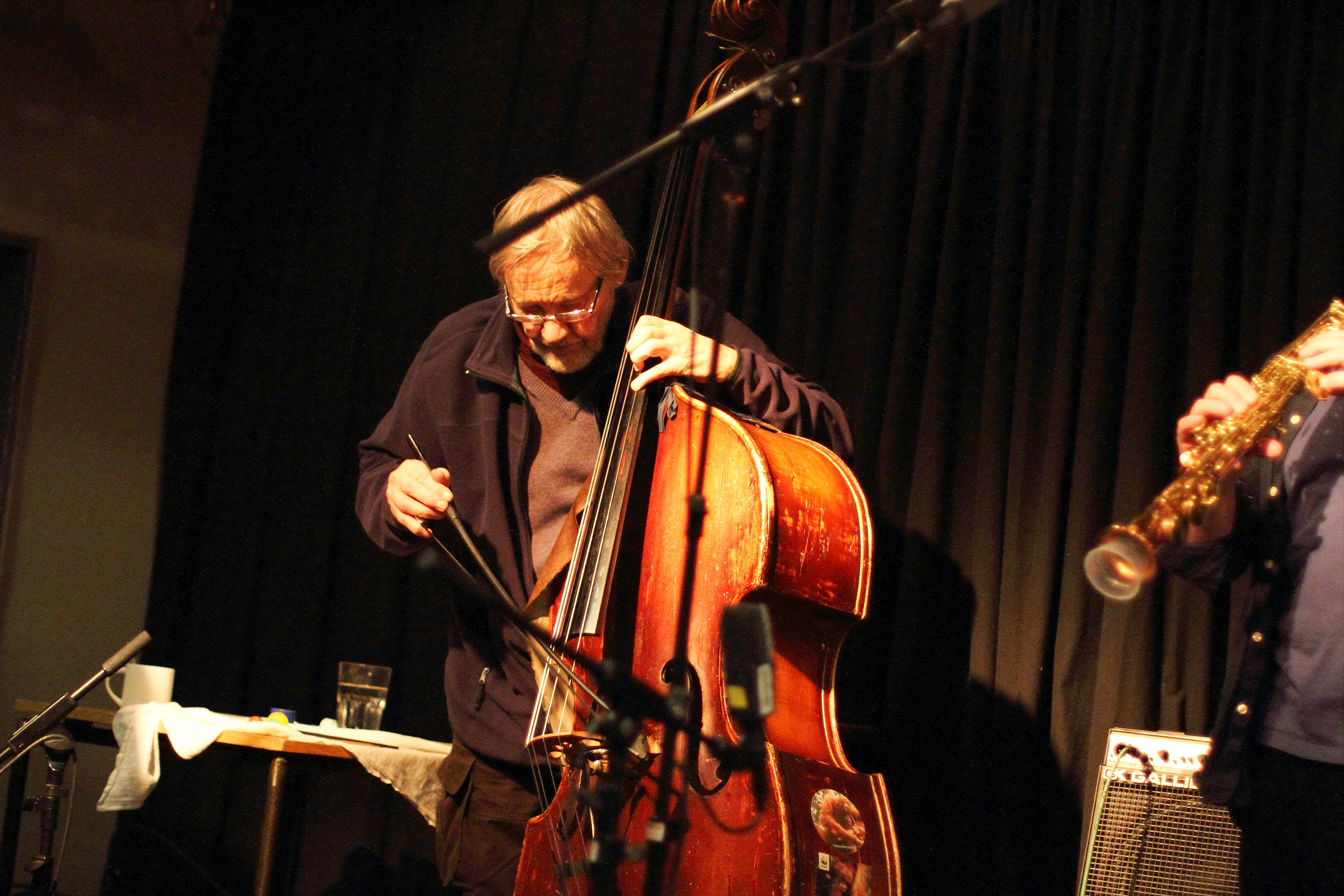
- Hauta-aho with Quintet Moderne at Club W71, Weikersheim

Background information
- Born: May 27, 1941; Janakkala, Finland
- Origin: Helsinki, Finland
- Died: November 27, 2021
- Genres: Classical, jazz
- Occupation(s): Musician, composer
- Instrument: Double bass

Teppo Hauta-aho (May 27, 1941 – November 27, 2021) was a Finnish double bassist and composer.

== Early life and studies ==
Hauta-aho was born in Janakkala, near Hämeenlinna, on May 27, 1941. He studied the double bass at the Sibelius Academy from 1963 to 1970 and with František Pošta in Prague.

== Later life and career ==
From 1965 to 1972, Hauta-aho played with the Helsinki Philharmonic Orchestra. From 1975, he was with the Finnish National Opera Orchestra. In 1999 he performed with Brazilian tenor saxophonist Ivo Perelman, Irish-Swiss pianist John Wolf Brennan and Finish drummer Teppo Mäkynen at Kerava Festival. One of his best known works, Fantasia, for trumpet and orchestra, won the 1986 Queen Maria Jose competition in Geneva. Another, Kadenza, has been the set piece for international music competitions and has been played at music festivals.

He was self-taught as a composer, and his compositions included a double bass concerto, chamber music and works for the double bass.

== Discography ==
With Tuohi Klang

- Pensselman Hits vol. 2765 (Finnlevy, 1972)(re-issue Svart Records,2022)

With Juhani Aaltonen

- Etiquette (Love, 1974)

With Pekka Pöyry

- Happy Peter (Leo, 1984)

With Anthony Braxton

- 2 Compositions (Järvenpää) 1988 (Leo, 1988 [1996])

With Evan Parker

- The Needles (Leo, 2000–01)

With Cecil Taylor

- Lifting the Bandstand (Fundacja Słuchaj!, 2021)

With Edward Vesala

- Nan Madol (JAPO, 1974)
- Soulset/Edward Vesala Jazz Band (Finnlevy, 1969)(re-issue Svart Records,2018)

With Heikki “Mike” Koskinen

- Kellari Trio (Edgetone Records, 2015)
- Mike Koskinen Orchestra (Finnlevy, 1973)(re-issue Svart Records,2016)
- August Conversations (Edgetone Records, 2019)

With Otherworld Ensemble

- Live at Malmitalo (Edgetone Records, 2018)
- Northern Fire (Edgetone Records, 2018)
- Return From Manala (Edgetone Records, 2020)
