= Expression (album) =

Studio album by John Coltrane
- Released: September 1967
- Recorded: February 15 & March 7, 1967
- Studio: Van Gelder (Englewood Cliffs)
- Genre: Free jazz
- Length: 39:20 original LP
- Label: Impulse! A-9120
- Producer: Bob Thiele

John Coltrane chronology
Kulu Sé Mama (1967)	Expression (1967)	Om (1968)

Professional ratings
Review scores
Source	Rating
AllMusic	4/5 stars
DownBeat	5/5 stars
The Penguin Guide to Jazz	3/4 stars
The Rolling Stone Jazz Record Guide	5/5 stars

Expression is a studio album by jazz saxophonist John Coltrane, recorded in early 1967 and released in late September of that year, around Coltrane's birthday, and two months after his death. This was the first posthumous release of a Coltrane recording. It was also his first charting album, reaching a small No. 194 on the Billboard Top LPs.

== Background and reception ==
All of the pieces on Expression were recorded in early 1967 at Van Gelder Studio in Englewood Cliffs, NJ. The track titled "Offering" was recorded on February 15 with Coltrane's quartet, which at the time consisted of Alice Coltrane on piano, Jimmy Garrison on bass, and Rashied Ali on drums. "Offering" was re-released, along with the entirety of the February 15 session, in 1995 on Stellar Regions. A week later, Coltrane and Ali recorded duo tracks that would later be released on Interstellar Space (1974) and Jupiter Variation (1978). On March 7, the quartet recorded "Ogunde" and "Number One". The latter did not appear on the original LP release but was added for the CD reissue. "Number One" also appears on Jupiter Variation. The exact recording dates for the two remaining tracks are currently unknown. "Expression" features the quartet, while "To Be" was recorded by the quartet plus Pharoah Sanders and possibly Algie DeWitt on bata drum. On this track, Coltrane plays alto flute, while Sanders plays flute and piccolo.

In May 1967, Coltrane, who had been suffering from liver cancer since mid-1966, and who had canceled a number of concerts that month, "spent days stretched out on a couch, listening back to his recent recording sessions." On July 14, three days before his death, Coltrane met with producer Bob Thiele to finish plans for the album, and suggested the title Expression.

Some writers have heard the music on Expression as acknowledging Coltrane's sense of his own impending death. Coltrane biographer J.C. Thomas wrote that Expression "has an eerie quality of finality, a carefully chosen musical refinement, that seems to sum up Coltrane's career, as if he knew that it might be one of his last recorded statements." According to Ben Ratliff, Coltrane told Thiele that "he wanted nothing on the album's jacket but the titles and names of the musicians. No description or analysis: he was tired of words." He also told Thiele: "By this point I don't know what else can be said in words about what I'm doing. Let the music speak for itself." Ashley Kahn wrote that "Expression serves as (Coltrane's) memorial album on the Impulse label, the thick black border on its cover lending it a sense of bereavement."

AllMusic reviewer Fred Thomas described Expression as "a varied and searching record", and states that the band "was performing in the most spiritually reaching territory Coltrane would aspire to." Thomas also wrote: "It's remarkable that Expression is not some world-weary harbinger of death and sickness, but an endlessly jubilant affair. Even in what must have been a time of tremendous pain and darkness, Coltrane's single-minded quest for understanding and transcendence took him to places of new exploration and light." Biographer Eric Nisenson wrote: "The music sounds as if he had simply turned another corner in his evolution... Expression is in the tradition of his great transitional albums, Giant Steps, Live at the Village Vanguard, and Transition. Sadly, Coltrane would not live to explore the new regions toward which his music was heading."

== Track listing ==
All tracks written by John Coltrane; details regarding recording dates are from The John Coltrane Reference.

No.	Title	Recording date	Length
1.	"Ogunde"	March 7, 1967	3:38
2.	"To Be"	February 15, 1967	16:22
3.	"Offering"	February 15, 1967	8:27
4.	"Expression"	Spring 1967	10:53

CD reissues bonus track
No.	Title	Recording date	Length
5.	"Number One"	March 7, 1967	11:55

== Personnel ==
- John Coltrane – tenor saxophone, flute
- Pharoah Sanders – flute, piccolo, tambourine (#2 only)
- Alice Coltrane – piano
- Jimmy Garrison – bass
- Rashied Ali – drums

== Production ==
- Victor Kalin – cover art

== Charts ==
Chart (1967)	Peak position
US Billboard Top LPs	194
