= The Mastery of John Coltrane / Vol. III: Jupiter Variation =

Compilation album by John Coltrane
- Released: 1978
- Recorded: February 22, 1967 (#3–4); March 7, 1967 (#1); Van Gelder Studio, Englewood Cliffs; February 2, 1966 (#2); Coast Recorders, San Francisco
- Genre: Free jazz
- Length: 37:00
- Label: Impulse! IA 9360
- Producer: John Coltrane

John Coltrane chronology
| The Mastery of John Coltrane / Vol. II: To the Beat of a Different Drum (1978) | The Mastery of John Coltrane / Vol. III: Jupiter Variation (1978) | The Mastery of John Coltrane / Vol. IV: Trane's Modes (1979) |

The Mastery of John Coltrane / Vol. III: Jupiter Variation, also known as Jupiter Variation, is a compilation album by American saxophonist John Coltrane, which features pieces recorded in 1966 and 1967, but not released until 1978 on Impulse! Records as IA 9360.

== Release history ==
All tracks were previously unreleased, at the time of release. "Number One" may also be found on the CD reissue of Expression, while "Jupiter (Variation)" and "Leo" may be found on the reissue of Interstellar Space. "Peace on Earth", with posthumous overdubs, can be found on Infinity. The version here is the original.

Professional ratings
Review scores
| Source | Rating |
|---|---|
| Allmusic | 3/5 stars |
| The Rolling Stone Jazz Record Guide | 3/5 stars |

== Track listing ==
Side 1
| No. | Title | Date recorded | Length |
|---|---|---|---|
| 1. | "Number One" | March 7, 1967 | 11:58 |
| 2. | "Peace on Earth" | February 2, 1966 | 7:12 |

Side 2
| No. | Title | Date recorded | Length |
|---|---|---|---|
| 1. | "Jupiter (Variation)" | February 22, 1967 | 6:48 |
| 2. | "Leo" | February 22, 1967 | 11:02 |

== Personnel ==
=== February 2, 1966 ===
- John Coltrane – tenor saxophone, bells
- Alice Coltrane – piano
- Charlie Haden – bass
- Rashied Ali – drums
- Ray Appleton – percussion
- Pharoah Sanders – tambourine, wooden flute

=== February 22, 1967 ===
- John Coltrane – tenor saxophone, bells
- Rashied Ali – drums

=== March 7, 1967 ===
- John Coltrane – tenor saxophone, bells
- Alice Coltrane – piano
- Jimmy Garrison – bass
- Rashied Ali – drums
