= Sean Bergin =

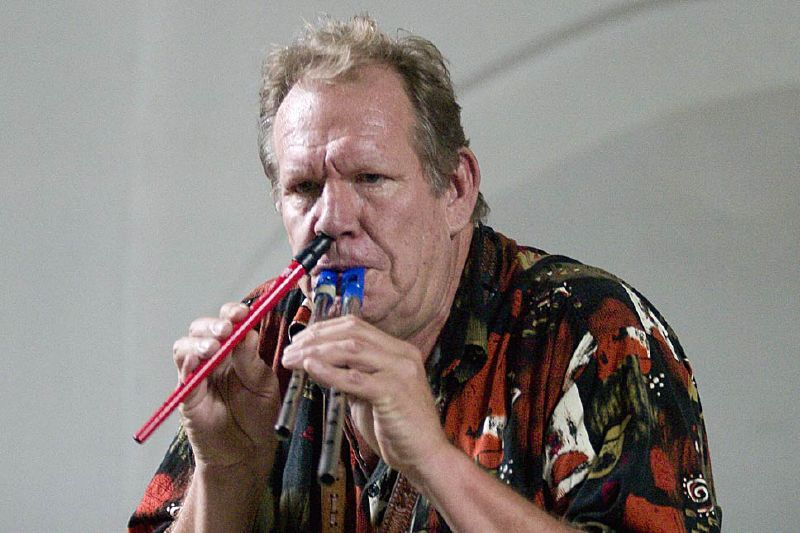

Background information
- Born: 29 June 1948; Durban, South Africa
- Died: 1 September 2012 (aged 64) Amsterdam, Netherlands
- Genres: Avant-garde jazz
- Occupations: Musician, composer, educator, bandleader
- Instruments: Saxophone, flute
- Years active: 1970s–2000s
- Labels: Nimbus, Data, BV Haast

Sean Bergin (29 June 1948 – 1 September 2012) was an avant-garde jazz saxophonist and flautist from South Africa.

Bergin was born in Durban on 29 June 1948. He was a saxophonist, flautist, composer, educator and bandleader. In his youth Bergin was influenced by the rich South African jazz. During apartheid, he performed illegally with black musicians. He is one of the expatriates of South African jazz to find success elsewhere. From 1976 he lived in Amsterdam. In addition to his M.O.B. ("My Own Band") project, Bergin was active in Trio San Francisco (a saxophone trio with Tobias Delius and Daniele D'Agaro), the Bug Band (with Paul Stocker), and in several Tristan Honsinger formations. He worked with Mal Waldron, Louis Moholo, Ernst Reijseger, Boi Akih, and Miriam Makeba. He won the VPRO/Boy Edgar Award in 2000.

== Discography ==
=== As leader ===
- Kids Mysteries (Nimbus)
- Live at the BIMhuis (BV Haast)
- Copy Cat (BV Haast)
- MOB Mobiel (Data)
- Nansika: Plays the Music of South African Composers (Data)
- Song Mob: Fat Fish (Data)
- Mistakes with Ernst Reijseger (Data)
- Chicken Feet (Pingo)
- Jazz for Freedom (Varajazz 1990)
- Tale of Three City's - with Rogério Bicudo (Pingo)
- Mixing It with Rogério Bicudo (Pingo)
- Lavoro with Tristan Honsinger (CAM Jazz)

=== As guest ===
- Alex Maguire's Cat O'Nine Tails - Hoki-Poki (Wire)
- J.C. Tans + Rockets - Bust Out! (BV Haast, 1983)
- Harry Miller Quintet - Down South (Varajazz, 1984)
- J.C. Tans + Rockets - A Rocket Symphony (BV Haast, 1985)
- Tristan Honsinger - Picnic (Data, 1985)
- Barry Altschul Quartet - That's Nice (Soul Note, 1986)
- Louis Moholo's Viva La Black - Louis Moholo's Viva La Black (Ogun, 1988)
- Louis Moholo's Viva La Black - Exile (Ogun, 1990)
- Lebombo - Khwela Jazz Khona (BV Haast, 1992)
- Louis Moholo's Viva La Black - Freedom Tour Live in South Afrika 1993 (Ogun, 1994)
- Dedication Orchestra - Ixesha (Ogun, 1994)
- Lebombo - Nabakitsi (BV Haast, 1995)
- Trio San Francisco - Prisoners of Pleasure (BV Haast, 1996)
- Eric Boeren - Cross Breeding (Bimhuis, 1997)
- Night in Torremolinos - Maiden Voyage Jazz Orchestra (BV Haast, 1999)
