= Iridium Jazz Club =

Jazz club in Manhattan, New York City

The Iridium
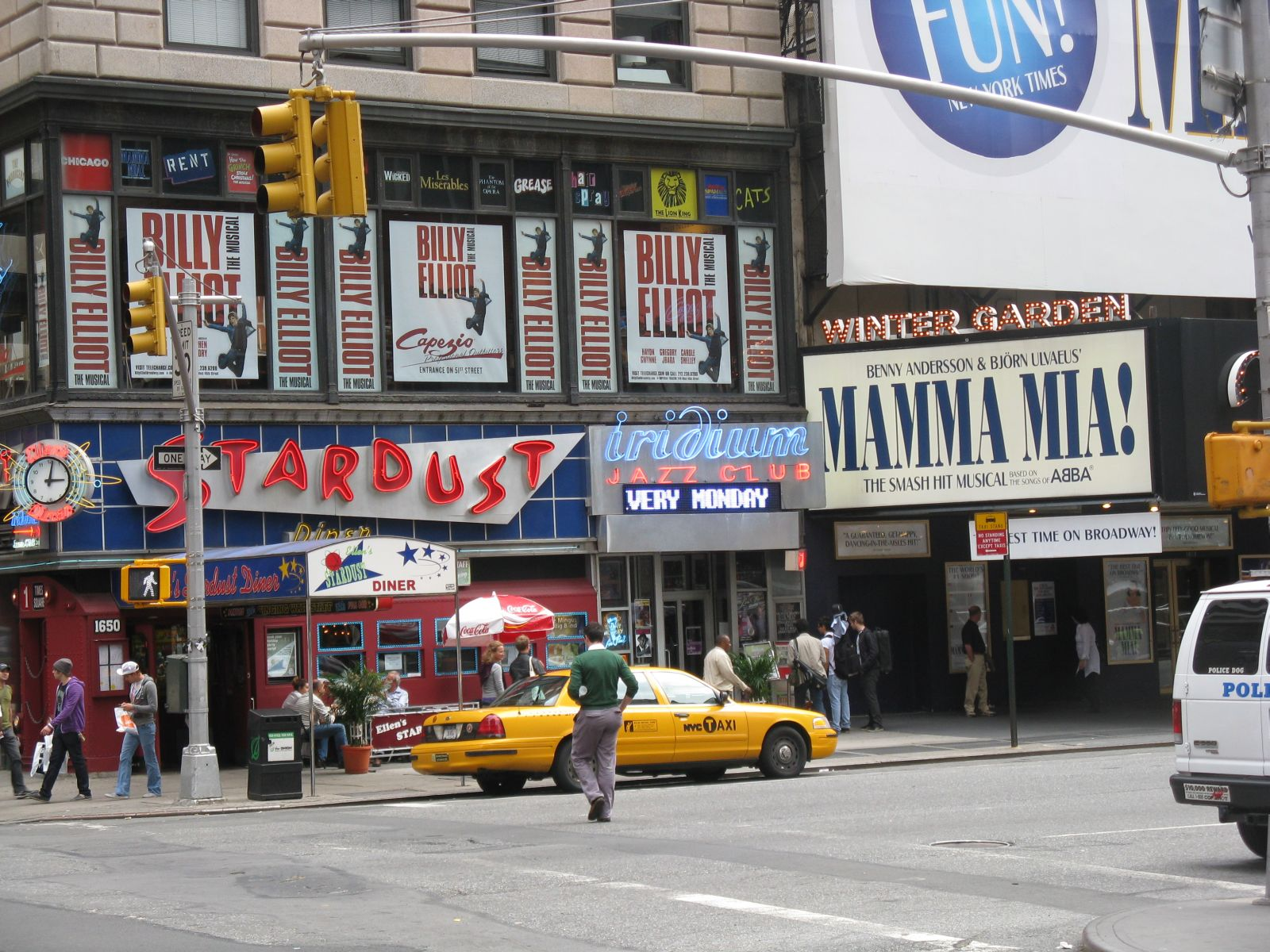
- The Iridium Jazz Club (center)
- Interactive map of The Iridium
- Address: 1650 Broadway (and 51st Street)
- Location: New York City, U.S.
- Coordinates: 40.76185°N 73.98358°W
- Owner: Sturm family
- Type: Jazz club

Construction
- Opened: December 1994

Website
- www.theiridium.com

The Iridium is a music club located on Broadway in New York City. The club featured weekly performances by Les Paul for nearly fifteen years.

== History ==
The club opened in January 1994 at its original location, at 63rd Street and Broadway in the basement of The Empire Hotel, with a minimal cover charge. That first location, known as the "Iridium Room Jazz Club", was a basement room below the Merlot restaurant across from Lincoln Center and initially booked "traditional, swinging jazz musicians of the second or third level." Ronald Sturm, the club's manager and booker, told The New York Times his goal was to "hire people like the trumpeter Marcus Printup, or Cyrus Chestnut or Carl Allen"—the goal was to give a chance to "younger, mainstream musicians while still booking the legends." In the opening months of its existence, local, unknown jazz groups and solo artists were given the opportunity to perform in front of an audience The original location underwent three renovations, then in August 2001 the club moved to its current location at 1650 Broadway on 51st Street.

Unlike many of New York City's jazz clubs, it has remained open to the present day, with the help of some major renovations to keep up with the number of attendees. There have been many major releases recorded live at Iridium, from artists like Kenny Garrett, Jacky Terrasson, Charlie Haden, Kenny Barron, Benny Carter, The Jazz Messengers, Sweets Edison, and Clark Terry.

Beginning in 1995 and continuing until his death at age 94, guitar legend Les Paul performed weekly at the club.

== Critical response ==
According to New York magazine, "the Iridium does its best to recreate the halcyon days of the 1920s and 1930s. Sure, the air’s no longer smoky, the décor’s a shadow of what it was and you’re sitting knee-to-knee with the European tourists at the next table, but true jazz aficionados overlook those minor details to hear sets played by some of the best-known names in the biz: vocalist Jimmy Scott, guitarist Mike Stern, saxophonist Pharoah Sanders, and the Mingus Legacy bands, to name a few."

== See also ==
- List of jazz clubs
