= Longineu Parsons II =

American jazz musician

Longineu Warren Parsons II is a classically trained trumpeter who plays in a wide variety of styles including jazz, blues, jazz fusion and classical. He is currently an Associate Professor of Music at Florida A&M University (FAMU).

Parsons played for Nat Adderley, Cab Calloway, Doc Severinsen, Herbie Mann, Archie Shepp, Sun Ra, Branford Marsalis and many more. He appeared in the national production of Satchmo. He was a featured soloist in the Great Performances special "Three Mo' Tenors."

He is the father of professional musician Longineu W. Parsons III.

In 1999, Ubiquity Records imprint Luv N' Haight released Spaced: Collected Works 1980-1999, compiling several recordings Parsons had made since 1980.

== Gallery ==
With Eryk Kulm at jazz club Tygmont Warsaw, Poland (2009)

Jazz club Tygmont Warsaw, Poland (2009)

Jazz club Tygmont Warsaw, Poland (2009)

Jazz club Tygmont Warsaw, Poland (2009)
