= Tristan Honsinger =

American cellist (1949–2023)

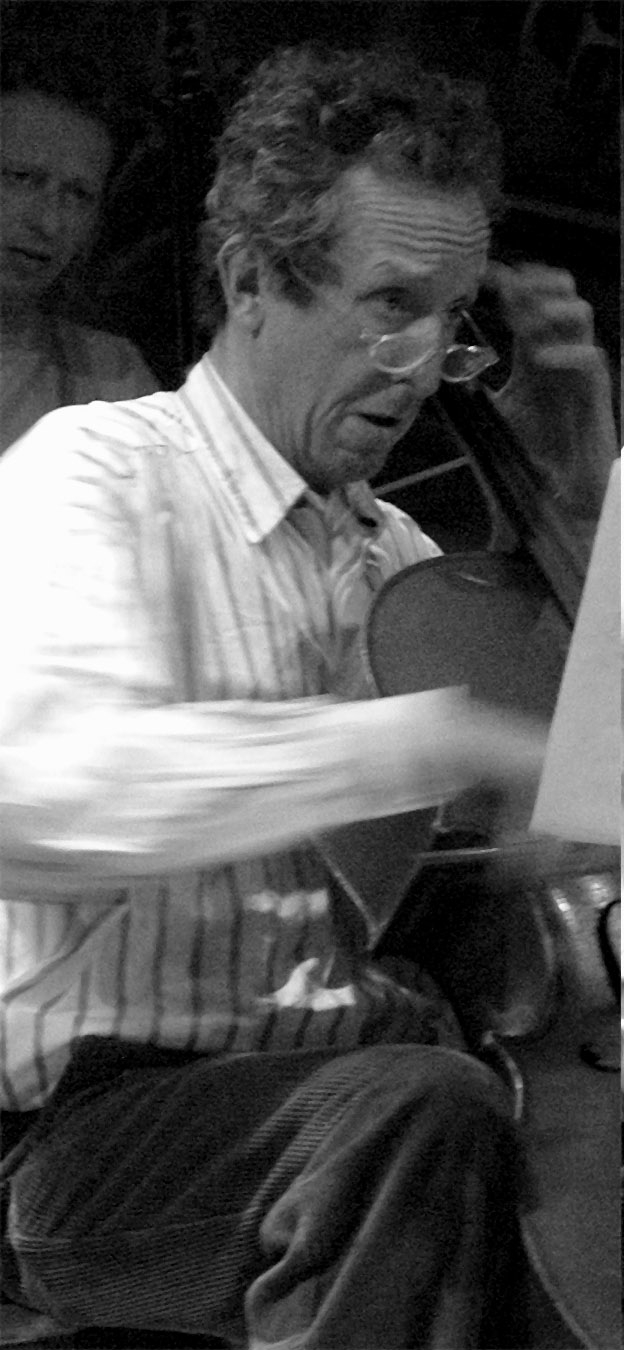
Honsinger in 2004

Tristan Honsinger (October 23, 1949 – August 5, 2023) was an American cellist active in free jazz and free improvisation. He is perhaps best known for his long-running collaboration with free jazz pianist Cecil Taylor and guitarist Derek Bailey.

Born in Burlington, Vermont, United States, Honsinger was given music lessons from a very early age, as his mother had hopes of creating a chamber orchestra together with his brother and sister. At the age of 12, Tristan would give concerts on a nearly weekly basis. He studied classical cello at the New England Conservatory in Boston before moving to Montreal in 1969 to avoid the draft. While in Canada, he became interested in improvisational music. Honsinger moved to Europe in 1974 and was active throughout the continent. He operated out of Amsterdam in the Netherlands.

Honsinger had a striking appearance, with body language reminiscent of that of a slapstick actor.

Honsinger experimented with a combo of three string-players (violin, cello, and double bass) and drums in 1991, under the name Fields in Miniature, and worked in other musical fields, including collaborations with UK post punk band The Pop Group in 1979, The Ex during the early 1990s, and the Ig Henneman Tentet.

According to Dutch Volkskrant journalist Erik van de Berg, "Honsinger is someone who hasn't lost his childhood fantasy entirely. His compositions are like a child's drawing, or even more like a story from Winnie The Pooh: awkward and touchingly simple, yet full of deeper meanings for those who want to see them." In the same article, Honsinger commented: "Simple things fascinate me, simple stories and simple characters. It's not that I write for children in particular, but I think they would understand it very well. I usually get the best reactions from an audience with a good mix of children and adults. I don't like to play for one particular age group. It is almost a necessity for me to compose in the form of stories and texts. It gives me ideas and it does help the musicians in their improvisation if they can think: this story is about a little man who takes a walk and experiences this, that and the other. It also helps the audience, it gives them something to hold on to."

Tristan Honsinger died in Trieste on August 5, 2023, at the age of 73.

== Discography (selected) ==
Year	Title	Label	Notes
1976	Duo	Incus Records	Duo with Derek Bailey
1981	Lavoro	Materiali Sonori	Duo with Sean Bergin
1988	The Hearth	FMP/Free Music Production	Trio with Cecil Taylor and Evan Parker
1988	Alms/Tiergarten (Spree)	FMP/Free Music Production	As part of Cecil Taylor European Orchestra
1993	Conduction #38: in Freud's garden	New World Records	Under the direction of Butch Morris
1995	Instant	CrossTalk (US) / RecRec Music (Netherlands)	The Ex & Guests
1993	Always a Pleasure	FMP/Free Music Production	As part of the Cecil Taylor Ensemble
1996	Almeda	FMP/Free Music Production	As part of the Cecil Taylor Ensemble
1996	Map of Moods	FMP/Free Music Production	With the Tristan Honsinger 5tet
1998	Lifting the Bandstand	Fundacja Słuchaj!	As part of the Cecil Taylor Quintet
1999	Incarnation	FMP/Free Music Production	Quartet with Cecil Taylor, Franky Douglas, and Andrew Cyrille
2000	A Camel's Kiss	Instant Composers Pool	Solo cello
2003	The Light of Corona	FMP/Free Music Production	As part of the Cecil Taylor Ensemble
2003	Broomriding	Psi	Alexander von Schlippenbach
2011	Stretto	FMP/Free Music Production	With guitarist Olaf Rupp
2012	Hanam Quintet feat. Tristan Honsinger	Aut Records	Hanam Quintet feat. Tristan Honsinger
2021	Small Talk	Setola di Maiale	Tristan Honsinger Italian octet

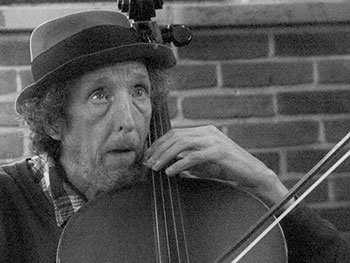
Tristan Honsinger Aarhus Jazz Festival (Denmark 2012)
