= Ben Ratliff =

American journalist, music critic, author (born 1968)

- Born: 1968 (age 57–58); New York City, U.S.
- Education: Columbia University
- Occupations: Journalist, music critic, author
- Employer: The New York Times

Ben Ratliff (born 1968) is an American journalist, music critic and author.

== Biography ==
Ratliff is the son of an English mother and an American father, growing up in London and in Rockland County, New York. From 1996 to 2016, he wrote about pop music and jazz for The New York Times. He is the author of five books: Run the Song: Writing About Running About Listening (2025), long-listed for the National Book Award in Nonfiction; Every Song Ever: Twenty Ways to Listen in an Age of Musical Plenty (2016); The Jazz Ear: Conversations Over Music (2008); Jazz: A Critic's Guide to the 100 Most Important Recordings (2002); and a critical biography of John Coltrane (Coltrane: The Story of a Sound, 2007), which was a finalist for the National Book Critics Circle Award. His articles have appeared in The New York Review of Books, Granta, Rolling Stone, Spin, The Village Voice, Slate and Lingua Franca. In 2005, he received the Helen Dance-Robert Palmer Award for "Excellence in Newspaper, Magazine or Online Writing" from the Jazz Journalists Association. From 2012 to 2016, he was a regular host of The New York Times popcast.

He teaches cultural criticism at New York University's Gallatin School of Individualized Study. Ratliff earned a B.A. from Columbia University in 1990.

== Publications ==
- Run the Song: Writing About Running About Listening. Graywolf Press, Minneapolis, 2025.
- Every Song Ever: Twenty Ways to Listen in an Age of Musical Plenty. Farrar, Straus and Giroux, New York, 2016.
- The Jazz Ear: Conversations Over Music. Times Books, New York, 2008.
- Coltrane: The Story of a Sound. Farrar, Straus and Giroux, New York, 2007.
- The New York Times Essential Library: Jazz. Times Books, New York, 2002.
