= List of jazz albums =

The following is a list of jazz albums, alphabetized by album titles.

Contents

Top – A B C D E F G H I J K L M N O P R S T U V W See also

== A ==
- Africa/Brass – John Coltrane
- Afro Blue Impressions – John Coltrane
- Afro-Harping - Dorothy Ashby
- Agharta - Miles Davis
- Air - Cecil Taylor
- Air Above Mountains - Cecil Taylor
- Akisakila -Cecil Taylor
- Alqgonquin - Cecil Taylor
- All Alone - Ron Carter
- All Blues - Ron Carter
- All Kinds of Time - Karl Berger & Dave Holland
- Almeda - Cecil Taylor
- Alms/Tiergarten (Spree) - Cecil Taylor
- Alone Together - Ron Carter & Jim Hall
- Always a Pleasure - Cecil Taylor
- Amandla – Miles Davis
- Andrew!!! - Andrew Hill
- Angels and Demons at Play – Sun Ra
- A.R.C. - Barry Altschul, Chick Corea & Dave Holland
- Anything Goes - Ron Carter
- The Art of the Trio Volume One – Brad Mehldau Trio
- Asante - McCoy Tyner
- Ascenseur pour l'échafaud - Miles Davis
- Ascension – John Coltrane
- At Carnegie Hall – Thelonious Monk Quartet with John Coltrane
- Aura – Miles Davis
- The Avant-Garde (album) – Don Cherry & John Coltrane

== B ==
- Bags' Groove – Miles Davis
- Bahia – John Coltrane
- Ballads – John Coltrane
- Bar Kokhba Sextet – 50th Birthday Celebration
- A Beautiful Day - Andrew Hill
- The Believer – John Coltrane
- Beyond the Missouri Sky (Short Stories) – Charlie Haden & Pat Metheny
- Beyond the Sound Barrier – Wayne Shorter Quartet
- Big Fun – Miles Davis
- Birth of the Cool – Miles Davis
- Bitches Brew – Miles Davis
- Black Beauty: Miles Davis at Fillmore West - Miles Davis
- Black Fire - Andrew Hill
- Black Pearls – John Coltrane
- Black Codes (From the Underground) – Wynton Marsalis
- The Black Saint and the Sinner Lady - Charles Mingus
- Blowin' the Blues Away – Horace Silver
- Blue Black - Andrew Hill
- The Blues and the Abstract Truth – Oliver Nelson
- Blue Haze – Miles Davis
- Blue Moods – Miles Davis
- Blue Period – Miles Davis
- Blue Train – John Coltrane
- Blue World – John Coltrane
- Blues Farm - Ron Carter
- Blues and the Soulful Truth - Leon Thomas
- Both Directions at Once: The Lost Album – John Coltrane
- But Not Farewell - Andrew Hill
- Bye Bye Blackbird – John Coltrane

== C ==
- Candy – Lee Morgan
- Caravan – Art Blakey and the Jazz Messengers
- Caramba! – Lee Morgan
- The Cat – Jimmy Smith
- The Cats – Kenny Burrell, John Coltrane, Tommy Flanagan & Idrees Sulieman
- Cattin' with Coltrane and Quinichette – John Coltrane & Paul Quinichette
- The Cat Walk – Donald Byrd
- Coltrane's Sound – John Coltrane
- Charisma – Lee Morgan
- The Circle Maker – John Zorn & Masada
- City Lights – Lee Morgan
- Collectors' Items – Miles Davis
- Coltrane (1957) – John Coltrane
- Coltrane (1962) – John Coltrane
- Coltrane Jazz – John Coltrane
- Coltrane Plays the Blues – John Coltrane
- Coltrane's Sound – John Coltrane
- The Complete 1961 Village Vanguard Recordings – John Coltrane
- The Complete Jack Johnson Sessions- Miles Davis
- The Compositions of Al Cohn – Miles Davis
- Compulsion - Andrew Hill
- Conception - Miles Davis, Stan Getz, Lee Konitz & Gerry Mulligan
- Conference of the Birds – Dave Holland Quartet
- Contours - Sam Rivers
- The Cooker – Lee Morgan
- Cookin' – Miles Davis
- Cornbread – Lee Morgan
- Cosmic Music – Alice Coltrane & John Coltrane
- Crescent – John Coltrane
- Crossings – Herbie Hancock

== D ==
- Dakar – John Coltrane
- Dance with Death - Andrew Hill
- Dark Magus - Miles Davis
- Decoy – Miles Davis
- Dedication – Herbie Hancock
- Deep Purple – Sun Ra
- Delightfulee – Lee Morgan
- Dialogue – Bobby Hutcherson
- Dig – Miles Davis
- Divine Revelation - Andrew Hill
- Dizzy Atmosphere – Al Grey, Wynton Kelly, Billy Mitchell, Lee Morgan, Charlie Persip, Billy Root & Paul West
- Doo-Bop – Miles Davis
- Dreams So Real - Gary Burton
- Duke Ellington & John Coltrane – John Coltrane & Duke Ellington
- Dusk - Andrew Hill
- Duster - Gary Burton

== E ==
- E.S.P. – Miles Davis
- East Broadway Run Down – Sonny Rollins
- Easy Living – Ella Fitzgerald
- Echoes of a Friend - McCoy Tyner
- Ella – Ella Fitzgerald
- Ella Abraça Jobim – Ella Fitzgerald
- Ella Fitzgerald Sings Songs from "Let No Man Write My Epitaph" – Ella Fitzgerald
- Ella Fitzgerald Sings Sweet Songs for Swingers – Ella Fitzgerald
- Ella Fitzgerald Sings the Cole Porter Songbook – Ella Fitzgerald
- Ella Fitzgerald Sings the Duke Ellington Songbook – Ella Fitzgerald
- Ella Fitzgerald Sings the George and Ira Gershwin Songbook – Ella Fitzgerald
- Ella Fitzgerald Sings the Harold Arlen Songbook – Ella Fitzgerald
- Ella Fitzgerald Sings the Irving Berlin Songbook – Ella Fitzgerald
- Ella Fitzgerald Sings the Jerome Kern Songbook – Ella Fitzgerald
- Ella Fitzgerald Sings the Johnny Mercer Songbook – Ella Fitzgerald
- Ella Fitzgerald Sings the Rodgers & Hart Songbook – Ella Fitzgerald
- Ella Fitzgerald and Billie Holiday at Newport – Ella Fitzgerald
- Ella Fitzgerald live at Mister Kelly's – Ella Fitzgerald
- Empyrean Isles – Herbie Hancock
- Enlightenment - McCoy Tyner
- E.S.P. – Miles Davis
- Eternity - Alice Coltrane
- The European Tour – John Coltrane
- Everybody Digs Bill Evans – Bill Evans
- Expansions - McCoy Tyner
- Expoobident – Lee Morgan
- Expression – John Coltrane
- Extensions - McCoy Tyner

== F ==
- Fat Albert Rotunda – Herbie Hancock
- Filles de Kilimanjaro – Miles Davis
- First Meditations – John Coltrane
- Flood – Herbie Hancock
- Four & More - Miles Davis
- Fuchsia Swing Song - Sam Rivers

== G ==
- Gary Burton & Keith Jarrett - Gary Burton & Keith Jarrett
- The George Benson Cookbook – George Benson
- A Genuine Tong Funeral - Gary Burton
- Get Up with It – Miles Davis
- Giant Steps – John Coltrane
- The Gigolo – Lee Morgan
- Genius of Modern Music, Vol. 1 – Thelonious Monk
- Getz/Gilberto – Stan Getz and João Gilberto

== H ==
- Here's Lee Morgan – Lee Morgan
- Head Hunters – Herbie Hancock
- Hip Harp - Dorothy Ashby
- Hot Fives & Sevens – Louis Armstrong
- Huntington Ashram Monastery - Alice Coltrane

== I ==
- Illuminations - Alice Coltrane & Carlos Santana
- Impressions – John Coltrane
- In A Silent Way – Miles Davis
- Inception - McCoy Tyner
- In Concert - Miles Davis
- Infinity – Lee Morgan
- In Person Friday and Saturday Nights at the Blackhawk, Complete - Miles Davis
- Interstellar Space – John Coltrane
- Introducing Lee Morgan – Lee Morgan
- Inventions and Dimensions – Herbie Hancock

== J ==
- Jack Johnson – Miles Davis
- Jazz på svenska – Jan Johansson
- Jazz Track – Miles Davis
- Jazz Way Out – John Coltrane & Wilbur Harden
- John Coltrane and Johnny Hartman – John Coltrane & Johnny Hartman
- John Coltrane with the Red Garland Trio – John Coltrane
- The John Coltrane Quartet Plays – John Coltrane
- Journey in Satchidananda - Alice Coltrane

== K ==
- Karma - Pharoah Sanders
- Kenny Burrell & John Coltrane – Kenny Burrell & John Coltrane
- Kind of Blue – Miles Davis
- The Koln Concert - Keith Jarrett
- Kulu Sé Mama – John Coltrane

== L ==
- Lanquidity – Sun Ra
- The Last Session – Lee Morgan
- The Last Trane – John Coltrane
- Lee Morgan Indeed! – Lee Morgan
- Lee Morgan Sextet – Lee Morgan
- Lee Morgan Vol. 3 – Lee Morgan
- Lee-Way – Lee Morgan
- Lennie Tristano – Lennie Tristano
- Like Someone in Love – Ella Fitzgerald
- Lady Day – Billie Holiday
- Live Around the World - Miles Davis
- Live at the Barrel - Miles Davis & Jimmy Forrest
- Live at Birdland – John Coltrane
- Live at Montreux - Miles Davis
- Live at Newport - McCoy Tyner
- Live at the Half Note: One Down, One Up – John Coltrane
- Live at the Lighthouse – Lee Morgan
- Live! at the Village Vanguard – John Coltrane
- Live at the Village Vanguard Again! – John Coltrane
- Live-Evil – Miles Davis
- Live in Antibes – John Coltrane
- Live in Japan – John Coltrane
- Live in Paris – John Coltrane
- Live in Seattle – John Coltrane
- Live in Sevilla 2000 – Masada
- Living Field – The Pillows
- Living Space – John Coltrane
- Lord of Lords - Alice Coltrane
- Lou's Blues – Lou Marini and the Magic City Jazz Orchestra
- Lofty Fake Anagram - Gary Burton
- A Love Supreme – John Coltrane
- Lush Life – John Coltrane

== M ==
- Maiden Voyage – Herbie Hancock
- Mainstream 1958 – John Coltrane & Wilbur Harden
- The Magic Hour – Wynton Marsalis
- Man-Child – Herbie Hancock
- The Man with the Horn – Miles Davis
- McCoy Tyner Plays Ellington - McCoy Tyner
- Meditations – John Coltrane
- Meets the Rhythm Section – Art Pepper
- Metheny/Mehldau – Pat Metheny & Brad Mehldau
- Midnight Blue – Kenny Burrell
- Midnight On Cloud 69 – George Shearing Quintet & Red Norvo Trio
- Miles Ahead – Miles Davis
- Miles & Monk at Newport - Miles Davis & Thelonious Monk
- Miles & Quincy Live at Montreux - Miles Davis & Quincy Jones
- Miles Davis All Star Sextet – Miles Davis
- Miles Davis All Stars, Volume 1 – Miles Davis
- Miles Davis All Stars, Volume 2 – Miles Davis
- Miles Davis and Horns – Miles Davis
- Miles Davis and the Modern Jazz Giants – Miles Davis
- Miles Davis in Europe - Miles Davis
- Miles Davis Quartet – Miles Davis
- Miles Davis Quintet – Miles Davis
- Miles Davis Volume 2 – Miles Davis
- Miles Davis, Volume 3 – Miles Davis
- Miles Davis with Sonny Rollins – Miles Davis
- Miles in Berlin - Miles Davis
- Miles in the Sky – Miles Davis
- Miles in Tokyo - Miles Davis
- Miles Smiles – Miles Davis
- Miles: The New Miles Davis Quintet – Miles Davis
- Milestones – Miles Davis
- Mingus Ah Um – Charles Mingus
- Mingus Mingus Mingus Mingus Mingus – Charles Mingus
- Moanin' – Art Blakey and the Jazz Messengers
- Momentum – Joshua Redman
- A Monastic Trio - Alice Coltrane
- Music from Siesta - Miles Davis & Marcus Miller
- The Musings of Miles – Miles Davis
- Mwandishi – Herbie Hancock
- My Favorite Things – John Coltrane
- My Favorite Things: Coltrane at Newport – John Coltrane
- My Funny Valentine - Miles Davis
- My Point of View – Herbie Hancock

== N ==
- Nefertiti – Miles Davis
- Never No Lament: The Blanton-Webster Band – Duke Ellington
- New Concepts of Artistry in Rhythm – Stan Kenton and His Orchestra
- Newport '63 – John Coltrane
- The New Sounds – Miles Davis
- New Thing at Newport – John Coltrane & Archie Shepp
- New York – Barcelona Crossings – Brad Mehldau Trio & Perico Sambeat
- A Night in Tunisia – Art Blakey and the Jazz Messengers
- Nights of Ballads & Blues - McCoy Tyner
- Night Train – The Oscar Peterson Trio

== O ==
- Offering: Live at Temple University – John Coltrane
- The Okeh Ellington – Duke Ellington
- The Olatunji Concert: The Last Live Recording – John Coltrane
- Olé Coltrane – John Coltrane
- Om – John Coltrane
- On the Corner – Miles Davis
- Out Front - Booker Little
- Out to Lunch! – Eric Dolphy
- Out of the Cool – Gil Evans Orchestra

== P ==
- Pangaea - Miles Davis
- The Paris Concert – John Coltrane
- Peckin' Time – Lee Morgan
- Point of Departure – Andrew Hill
- Porgy and Bess – Miles Davis
- The Prisoner – Herbie Hancock
- The Procrastinator – Lee Morgan
- Ptah, the El Daoud - Alice Coltrane

== Q ==
- Quiet Nights – Miles Davis & Gil Evans
- Quintet / Sextet – Miles Davis & Milt Jackson

== R ==
- Radha-Krsna Nama Sankirtana - Alice Coltrane
- The Rajah – Lee Morgan
- Reaching Fourth - McCoy Tyner
- The Real McCoy - McCoy Tyner
- Relaxin' – Miles Davis
- Return to Forever – Chick Corea
- Root Down – Jimmy Smith
- 'Round About Midnight – Miles Davis
- Rubberband – Miles Davis
- The Rumproller- McCoy Tyner

== S ==
- Sanhedrin 1994-1997 – Masada
- Sahara - McCoy Tyner
- Search for the New Land – Lee Morgan
- Secrets – Herbie Hancock
- Selflessness: Featuring My Favorite Things – John Coltrane
- Settin' the Pace – John Coltrane
- Seven Steps to Heaven – Miles Davis
- Sextant – Herbie Hancock
- The Shape of Jazz to Come – Ornette Coleman
- The Sidewinder – Lee Morgan
- The Sixth Sense – Lee Morgan
- Sketches of Spain – Miles Davis
- Smokin' at the Half Note – Wes Montgomery and the Wynton Kelly Trio
- Someday My Prince Will Come – Miles Davis
- Something in Common - Houston Person & Ron Carter
- Song for My Father – Horace Silver
- Song for My Lady - McCoy Tyner
- Songs of Berlin - Marc Secara and the Berlin Jazz Orchestra
- A Song for You - Ron Carter
- Sonic Boom – Lee Morgan
- Sonore – Peter Brötzmann, Ken Vandermark & Mats Gustafsson
- Sorcerer – Miles Davis
- Soultrane – John Coltrane
- So What? - Ron Carter
- Spanish Blue - Ron Carter
- Speak Like a Child – Herbie Hancock
- Spiritual Unity – Albert Ayler
- Standard Bearers - Ron Carter
- Standard Coltrane – John Coltrane
- Standards – Lee Morgan
- Stardust – John Coltrane
- Star People – Miles Davis
- Steamin' – Miles Davis
- Stellar Regions – John Coltrane
- Sunday at the Village Vanguard - Bill Evans Trio
- Sun Ship – John Coltrane
- Suspicious Activity? – The Bad Plus

== T ==
- Take Twelve – Lee Morgan
- Takin' Off – Herbie Hancock
- Tanganyika Strut – John Coltrane & Wilbur Harden
- Taru – Lee Morgan
- Tears for Dolphy – Ted Curson
- Tender Moments - McCoy Tyner
- Thrust – Herbie Hancock
- Time for Tyner - McCoy Tyner
- Timeless – John Abercrombie, Jack DeJohnette & Jan Hammer
- T'Estimo Tant – Tete Montoliu
- Time Out – Dave Brubeck Quartet
- Time Further Out – Dave Brubeck Quartet
- Today and Tomorrow - McCoy Tyner
- Tom Cat – Lee Morgan
- Transfiguration - Alice Coltrane
- Translinear Light - Alice Coltrane
- Transition – John Coltrane
- Transcendence - Alice Coltrane
- A Tribute to Jack Johnson - Miles Davis
- Tutu – Miles Davis
- Two of a Mind – Paul Desmond & Gerry Mulligan

== U ==
- Urlicht/Primal Light – Gustav Mahler & Uri Caine
- Underground – Thelonious Monk
- Universal Consciousness - Alice Coltrane
- Uptown Conversation - Ron Carter

== V ==
- Voice of Chunk – The Lounge Lizards

== W ==
- Walkin' – Miles Davis
- Water Babies – Miles Davis
- We Want Miles - Miles Davis
- Where? - Ron Carter
- Winter in Venice – Esbjörn Svensson Trio
- We Insist! Max Roach's Freedom Now Suite – Max Roach et al.
- Welcome to Hungary! The Tommy Vig Orchestra 2012 Featuring David Murray – Tommy Vig
- What Is There to Say? – Gerry Mulligan
- When Farmer Met Gryce - Art Farmer and Gigi Gryce
- Workin' – Miles Davis
- World Galaxy - Alice Coltrane

== Y ==
- Young Man with a Horn – Miles Davis
- You're Under Arrest – Miles Davis

== See also ==
- List of jazz fusion recordings
