= The Carnegie Hall Concert (Alice Coltrane album) =

Live album by Alice Coltrane
- Released: 2024
- Recorded: February 21, 1971
- Venues: Carnegie Hall, New York City
- Genre: Free jazz
- Length: 79:25
- Labels: Impulse! 00602458828696
- Producer: Ken Druker

Alice Coltrane chronology
Kirtan: Turiya Sings (2021)	The Carnegie Hall Concert (2024)

The Carnegie Hall Concert is a live album by Alice Coltrane. It was recorded at Carnegie Hall in New York City on February 21, 1971, and was released in 2024 by Impulse! Records. On the album, Coltrane appears on piano and harp, and is joined by saxophonists Pharoah Sanders and Archie Shepp, double bassists Jimmy Garrison and Cecil McBee, and drummers Ed Blackwell and Clifford Jarvis.

The album was recorded at a benefit for Swami Satchidananda's Integral Yoga Institute that also featured Laura Nyro and The New Rascals. A concert reviewer for Billboard described Coltrane's band as "one of the greatest assemblages to appear on the Carnegie Hall stage."

The recording features two compositions by Alice Coltrane, "Journey in Satchidananda" and "Shiva-Loka," both of which appeared on her album Journey in Satchidananda (Impulse!, 1971), plus two pieces by her late husband, John Coltrane: "Africa," first heard on the 1961 album Africa/Brass, and "Leo," versions of which previously appeared on the Impulse! albums Infinity (1972), Live in Japan (1973), Interstellar Space (1974), The Mastery of John Coltrane, Vol. 3: Jupiter Variation (1978), and Offering: Live at Temple University (2014). This performance of "Africa" was originally issued on Carnegie Hall '71 (Hi Hat, 2018).

== Reception ==
Professional ratings
Review scores
Source	Rating
All About Jazz	4/5 stars
AllMusic	4/5 stars
DownBeat	4.5/5 stars
Financial Times	4/5 stars
Jazzwise	4/5 stars
Mojo	4/5 stars
Pitchfork	8.4/10

Jon Pareles of The New York Times stated that the concert "gathered force like a typhoon," noting the contrast between the "serene opening" and the "squall of free jazz" with which it concludes.

DownBeat's John Ephland called the album "a marvelous transition for Coltrane," and stated: "Bandmates sound very much in sync... In 1971, this music may have been of its time, but today, more than half a century later, it sounds like a clarion call for something worth listening to and playing as the New New Thing."

In a review for The New Yorker, Richard Brody described Coltrane's solo on "Leo" as "the most thrilling single concentration of her art that I've ever heard," and wrote: "after intense duos by Sanders and Shepp on tenor sax, she enters with ringing, fervent chords that yield to gospel-like tremolos, from which emerges an obsessive bass-note chiming that sounds like church bells from space."

Writing for the Financial Times, Mike Hobart noted that the "solos are long and the arrangements ad-lib," but acknowledged the fact that "the commitment of the playing and Coltrane's guiding hand on piano and harp ensure the music's emotional force."

Pitchfork's Hank Shteamer suggested that, on the album, Coltrane is "here in full: the matriarch we now know well and duly appreciate; the Godfather we may not have ever properly reckoned with. The devotee of Satchidananda; the torchbearer for John. And the bandleader and instrumental powerhouse who marshaled formidable talents like Pharoah Sanders and Archie Shepp, and found space for them within her rapidly expanding musical vision."

Edwin Pouncey of Jazzwise called the album "noble," and commented: "Live at Carnegie Hall expertly succeeds in bringing this important episode in Alice Coltrane’s musical ascension vividly back to life – to the point where you might possibly believe you were there on that magical evening."

In an article for Mojo, Andrew Male remarked: "What began as a benefit for Swami Satchidananda and evolved into a summoning of John Coltrane's spirit now stands as a tribute to the liberating force of Alice Coltrane herself. It's a communion. Drink deep."

Commenting for The Quietus, Antonio Poscic described the album as "inspirited" and "crucial", and wrote: "It's mesmerising to hear these particular takes for the first time as they show just how deeply invested, how certain, Coltrane and her collaborators were in the music and the devotional flow fuelling it... the group's performance... is confident and inspired."

The Nation's Marcus J. Moore stated: "At Carnegie Hall, Alice proved she had a sound all her own... On these tracks, Alice proved she wasn't just a practitioner of transcendental harmonies; she had the same verve as other free jazz luminaries."

Thom Jurek of AllMusic commented: "the concert's pace, textures, explosive drama, virtuosity, and limitless creativity are unmatched... This is an essential entry in Coltrane's catalog."

In a review for UK Jazz News, Phil Johnson remarked: "The Carnegie Hall Concert is both an historically important document and an eminently listenable recording full of insistent grooves, remarkably powerful playing and intense compositional depth... essential for anyone wishing to understand where jazz was then and where it has got to now."

Writing for All About Jazz, Marc Myers called the album "a landmark performance that was both commanding and reflective of a fast-moving era that upended norms" and wrote: "Few jazz recordings have captivated me the way this one has, with its extraordinary emotion, Black power, pan-Africanism and artistic endurance by all of the performers."

== Track listing ==
Side A
No.	Title	Writer(s)	Length
1.	"Journey in Satchidananda"	Alice Coltrane	15:02

Side B
No.	Title	Writer(s)	Length
2.	"Shiva-Loka"	Alice Coltrane	14:40

Side C
No.	Title	Writer(s)	Length
3.	"Africa"	John Coltrane	28:09

Side D
No.	Title	Writer(s)	Length
4.	"Leo"	John Coltrane	21:34
Total length:			79:25

== Personnel ==
- Alice Coltrane – piano, harp, percussion
- Pharoah Sanders – tenor saxophone, soprano saxophone, flute, fife, percussion
- Archie Shepp – tenor saxophone, soprano saxophone, percussion
- Jimmy Garrison – double bass
- Cecil McBee – double bass
- Ed Blackwell – drums
- Clifford Jarvis – drums
- Kumar Kramer – harmonium
- Tulsi – tamboura
