= The Ecstatic Music of Alice Coltrane Turiyasangitananda =

Compilation album by Alice Coltrane
- Released: 2017
- Recorded: 1981–1995
- Genre: World music, Devotional
- Length: 77:23
- Label: Luaka Bop; LBOP-087

The Ecstatic Music of Alice Coltrane Turiyasangitananda is a compilation album by Alice Coltrane. The music was drawn from the master tapes of four recordings that had been previously released on cassette in limited quantities for members of the Sai Anantam Ashram in California: Turiya Sings (1982), Divine Songs (1987), Infinite Chants (1990), and Glorious Chants (1995). The album, a double-LP set on which Coltrane is heard on vocals, organ, synthesizer, and harp, was released in 2017 by Luaka Bop as Volume 1 of their World Spirituality Classics series.

== Reception ==
Professional ratings
Review scores
Source	Rating
AllMusic	4.5/5 stars
The Guardian	4/5 stars
Pitchfork	8.8/10
Jazzwise	4/5 stars

In a review for AllMusic, Thom Jurek wrote: "The music exists in the space where 'ecstatic' meets 'heavy.' Coltrane... brought all of her musical history to bear in these pieces, from her beginnings playing piano in the churches of Detroit and the hard bop she played there to Paris and New York, to the vanguard... This is not just ecstatic music, but cosmic soul music. If you buy one archival recording this year, let this be it."

The Guardian's John Lewis stated: "Even those untouched by spiritual connotations of this music should be able to embrace its truly numinous energy."

Writing for Pitchfork, Jenn Pelly commented: "These sublime ensemble recordings reflect not just the result but the process of deep enlightenment... This was one of the greatest composers of the 20th century bringing a completely unusual confluence of experience... to prayer songs... With their widened musical scope, they feel more like prayers for humanity."

In an article for NPR, Anastasia Tsioulcas remarked: "this is music that... demands participation: The particulars of what or who you believe in (or don't) may not even matter. Either you're going to be using your voice to sing along, or your heart."

Brandon Roos of Needle to the Groove wrote: "Alice Coltrane may have been absent from the public eye for 25 years, but Ecstatic Music proves that music was still a centerpiece of her life during that time. Here, the focal point isn't on virtuosic solos or a dense composition that draws attention to itself; rather, it's in crafting moments that build emotional intensity through greater repetition, participation, and intention."

Record Collector's Mike Goldsmith stated: "recent years have seen a snowballing re-evaluation of Alice Coltrane's catalogue that has set her free from the legacy of her late husband's work. This is an important release that will continue that cause further, 10 years after her passing."

Writing for Jazzwise, Kevin Le Gendre commented: "If Alice Coltrane's place as a true original in 21st century music was ever in doubt then this beguiling, entrancing work, shaped by Indian religious chants, electronica, western pop, careful orchestration and concise improvisation, confirms that in no uncertain terms."

Euan Andrews of The Quietus remarked: "this is music with which to fling curtains open, welcome in the light and let the sound fill your room. If you have no home or room of your own, it will fill the empty spaces which surround you and in which you don't belong as well as the empty spaces inside which don't belong to you. It will, in short, heal you."

== Track listing ==
Side A
No.	Title	Original release	Length
1.	"Om Rama"	Infinite Chants	9:39
2.	"Om Shanti"	Divine Songs	6:52
Total length:			16:31

Side B
No.	Title	Original release	Length
3.	"Rama Rama"	Divine Songs	7:35
4.	"Rama Guru"	Infinite Chants	5:52
5.	"Hari Narayan"	Divine Songs	4:38
Total length:			18:05

Side C
No.	Title	Original release	Length
6.	"Journey to Satchidananda"	Glorious Chants	10:53
7.	"Er Ra"	Divine Songs	5:00
8.	"Keshava Murahara"	Divine Songs	9:43
Total length:			25:36

Side D
No.	Title	Original release	Length
9.	"Krishna Japaye"	Infinite Chants	5:31
10.	"Rama Katha"	Turiya Sings	11:40
Total length:			17:11 77:23

== Personnel ==
- Alice Coltrane – vocals, organ, synthesizers (Oberheim OB-8), harp
- The Sai Anantam Singers – vocals
- Joshua Spiegelman – flute solo on "Journey to Satchidananda"
- Sai Ram Iyer – vocal solo on "Journey to Satchidananda"
- John Panduranga Henderson - vocal solo on "Om Rama"
