= Transfiguration (Alice Coltrane album) =

Live album by Alice Coltrane
- Released: 1978
- Recorded: April 16, 1978
- Venue: Schoenberg Hall, UCLA, Los Angeles, California
- Genre: Free jazz, spiritual jazz
- Length: 1:19:20
- Label: Warner Bros; WB 3218
- Producer: Ed Michel

Alice Coltrane chronology
Transcendence (1977)	Transfiguration (1978)	Turiya Sings (1982)

Transfiguration is a live album by Alice Coltrane. It was recorded in Los Angeles, California, in April 1978, and was released as a double album later that year by Warner Bros. On the album, Coltrane appears on piano and organ, and is joined by bassist Reggie Workman and drummer Roy Haynes. One track, "Prema," also includes an overdubbed string section. Transfiguration features five original compositions plus an extended version of John Coltrane's "Leo." It was her last jazz-oriented album, and last commercial release, until 2004's Translinear Light. Coltrane biographer Franya J. Berkman called it "her farewell to the jazz business."

== Reception ==
Professional ratings
Review scores
Source	Rating
AllMusic	4.5/5 stars
The Penguin Guide to Jazz	3/4 stars
The Vinyl District	A
The Guardian	3/5 stars

In a review for AllMusic, Thom Jurek wrote: "If you can only own one Alice Coltrane record, this should be it."

A writer for All About Jazz stated that the album "represents the culmination of her spiritual music via recordings," and commented: "Her Detroit church organist experience is on full display from the beginning. If she performed at this level in her church back in the '50s, it certainly would have appropriately foreshadowed perhaps the hippest of churches, the Saint John Coltrane African Orthodox Church in San Francisco."

John Eyles of the BBC noted that Coltrane's "improvisations show little development... If that reads like a criticism, it isn't meant to be; the combination of Coltrane's keyboards with Workman and Haynes is highly successful. They provide the flexibility and responsiveness that Coltrane needs to support her playing and stop the minimalism becoming one-dimensional."

The Vinyl District's Joseph Neff called the album "a return to roots but in no way a stylistic backslide" and "a wondrously searching gem," and described "Leo" as "an enthralling showstopper," in which "any lingering talk of the inadequacy of '70s exploratory jazz dissipates like so much hot air."

The Guardian's John Fordham stated that Haynes and Workman are "perfect foils," and wrote: "Coltrane's highly distinctive organ sound at times resembles Northumbrian pipes, with added sitar-like whirrs and pitch bends, but there are moments of churning chordwork, warped melody and heated climaxes on this session."

Writing for Spectrum Culture, Daniel Bromfield described the album as "a true masterpiece" and "Coltrane's most convincingly spiritual record." He commented: "It seems to summon up a presence greater than itself through the sheer force of the sound she and the rhythm section that backs her kicks up... Transfiguration is so extreme it feels like the logical limit to how far she can push the sound and form of jazz."

Writer Jordannah Elizabeth stated: "This one is for the enthusiasts who don't want chocolate in their peanut butter. It's as if she respectfully left something for the people who she knew would not spiritually ascend into the clouds with her. She knew that it was end of the road for her and some of her loyal, purist followers, and she did a brilliant job of jamming her heart out and, in the process, creating a flawless piece of work."

== Track listing ==
Tracks were recorded at Schoenberg Hall, UCLA, Los Angeles, California, on April 16, 1978. Overdubbed strings on "Prema" recorded at Westlake Audio, Los Angeles, California.

All tracks were composed by Alice Coltrane with the exception of "Leo" by John Coltrane.

Side A
No.	Title	Length
1.	"Transfiguration"	11:43
2.	"Spoken Introduction & One For The Father"	7:25

Side B
No.	Title	Length
3.	"Prema"	9:16
4.	"Affinity"	10:50

Side C
No.	Title	Length
5.	"Krishnaya"	3:21
6.	"Leo, Part One"	16:35

Side D
No.	Title	Length
7.	"Leo, Part Two"	20:10
Total length:		1:19:20

== Personnel ==
- Alice Coltrane – organ, piano
- Reggie Workman – bass
- Roy Haynes – drums

=== String ensemble (on "Prema") ===
- Violins - Jay Rosen, Murray Adler, Noel Pointer, Sherwyn Hirbod, Michelle Sita Coltrane
- Violas - Janice Ford, Pamela Goldsmith
- Cellos - Christina King, Ray Kelley
