= Lord of Lords =

Lord of Lords may refer to:

- A title of God used in Deuteronomy 10:17 and Psalm 136:3
- A title of Jesus used in 1 Timothy 6:15, Revelation 17:14, and Revelation 19:16
- A title of Bahá'u'lláh
- Overlord
- Lord of Lords (album), a 1972 album by Alice Coltrane

== See also ==
- King of Kings
