= Coltrane (disambiguation) =

John Coltrane (1926–1967) was an American jazz saxophonist.

Coltrane may also refer to:

- Coltrane (surname)
- Coltrane (1957 album), an album by John Coltrane from Prestige
- Coltrane (1962 album), an album by John Coltrane from Impulse!
- Coltrane (The Simpsons), a fictional cat from The Simpsons
