= Cosmic Music =

Studio album by John Coltrane and Alice Coltrane
- Released: July 1968
- Recorded: February 2, 1966; January 29, 1968
- Studio: Coast Recorders, San Francisco, California, Coltrane home studio, Dix Hills, New York
- Genre: Free jazz; avant-garde jazz
- Length: 34:08
- Label: Coltrane; Impulse!

John Coltrane chronology
Om (1968)	Cosmic Music (1968)	Selflessness: Featuring My Favorite Things (1969)

Cosmic Music is a jazz album by John Coltrane and Alice Coltrane released after John Coltrane's death. John Coltrane only plays on two tracks, "Manifestation" and "Reverend King".

== Background ==
In late January 1966, Coltrane and his group, which included saxophonist Pharoah Sanders, pianist Alice Coltrane (McCoy Tyner had left the group at the end of the previous year), bassist Jimmy Garrison, bassist / clarinetist Donald Rafael Garrett, and drummers Elvin Jones and Rashied Ali, arrived in San Francisco for a two-week gig at the Jazz Workshop, sharing the bill with Thelonious Monk's quartet. During the first week of their visit, Jones resigned from the band, joining Duke Ellington's group, and was replaced by Ray Appleton. Garrett also left for part of the gig.

On February 2, the group (without Garrett, and with Appleton substituting for Jones), visited Coast Recorders in San Francisco, where they recorded a number of tracks, including "Manifestation" and "Reverend King." (Note: There is evidence that "Manifestation" is actually an excerpt from an extended version of "Leo" recorded that day.) "Manifestation" features solos by John Coltrane on tenor sax, Sanders on piccolo (returning later on tenor sax), and Alice Coltrane on piano. (It was Alice Coltrane's first recording with her husband.) "Reverend King" begins and ends with chants of "Aum-Mani-Pad-Mi-Hum" and features a solo by Sanders on tenor, as well as one of John Coltrane's few recorded appearances on bass clarinet.

Tapes of these two tracks remained in the Coltranes' house until January 1968, roughly six months after John Coltrane's death, when Alice Coltrane decided to pair them with two tracks she recorded with her own group, "Lord, Help Me to Be" and "The Sun". These were her first recordings as a leader, and feature bassist Garrison and drummer Ben Riley, with Sanders appearing on tenor sax on "Lord, Help Me to Be" and briefly on flute on "The Sun". "The Sun" begins with a recording of John Coltrane and Sanders chanting "May there be peace and love and perfection throughout all creation," and ends with John Coltrane's voice saying "Alice?" Both pieces were later released as bonus tracks on the CD reissue of Alice Coltrane's first solo album, A Monastic Trio.

These four tracks were initially released as Cosmic Music on Coltrane Records in late 1968. However, representatives from Impulse! Records soon contacted Alice Coltrane, offering to include her as an Impulse! artist and suggesting that Cosmic Music be re-released on their label. She recalled: "Once [Cosmic Music] was available... the Impulse people said, 'Your ideas are fine, the music is good, but let us produce it. Let us have control of the artwork, and we'll put out a beautiful cover and music that's in your hands, and it'll be a very nice album and we also can get it out throughout the world.' There was no sense of someone coercing or whatever, or even trying to persuade me. It was just, 'If you would like, we can produce it very nicely for you.' And it was!" The album was reissued by Impulse! in 1969 with new cover art and with the co-credit "produced by Coltrane Records."

Two of the remaining tracks from the February 2, 1966 session appeared on Infinity with extensive editing and overdubbing, and one of the tracks also appeared on Jupiter Variation.

== Reception ==
Professional ratings
Review scores
Source	Rating
AllMusic	3/5 stars
Rolling Stone	(positive)
The Rolling Stone Jazz Record Guide	3/5 stars

AllMusic reviewer Michael G. Nastos called Cosmic Music "emphatic, surging, and sometimes unfathomable." Thom Jurek, also writing for AllMusic, wrote "While this record holds up quite well... it is still a minor Impulse album compared to some of the saxophonist's master works." John Corbett included the album in his book Vinyl Freak: Love Letters to a Dying Medium, referring to "Manifestation" as "beautiful energy music, as Coltrane knew how to craft it" and expressing admiration for "Reverend King"'s "gloriously ecstatic bass clarinet — another underdocumented facet of Trane’s recorded history — and... joyous group interaction by the full ensemble."

== Track listing ==
Side A
No.	Title	Recording date and location	Length
1.	"Manifestation"	February 2, 1966, Coast Recorders	11:37
2.	"Lord, Help Me to Be"	January 29, 1968, New York City	7:29

Side B
No.	Title	Recording date and location	Length
3.	"Reverend King"	February 2, 1966, Coast Recorders	11:00
4.	"The Sun"	January 29, 1968, New York City	4:02
Total length:			34:08

== Personnel ==
- John Coltrane (tracks 1 and 3) – tenor saxophone, bass clarinet
- Pharoah Sanders – tenor saxophone, piccolo, flute
- Alice Coltrane – piano
- Jimmy Garrison – bass
- Rashied Ali (tracks 1 and 3) – drums
- Ray Appleton (tracks 1 and 3) – percussion
- Ben Riley (tracks 2 and 4) – percussion
