= Coltrane (surname) =

Coltrane is an Irish surname derived from the Irish language Ó Coltaráin. Notable people with the surname include:

- Alice Coltrane (1937–2007), American jazz musician, wife of John Coltrane
- David S. Coltrane (1893–1968), American politician
- Chi Coltrane (born 1948), American rock musician
- Ellar Coltrane (born 1994), American actor
- John Coltrane (1926–1967), American jazz saxophonist
- Michelle Coltrane, American jazz singer, step-daughter of John Coltrane
- Ravi Coltrane (born 1965), American jazz saxophonist, son of John Coltrane
- Robbie Coltrane (1950–2022), Scottish actor

Fictional characters:

- Sheriff Rosco P. Coltrane, character on The Dukes of Hazzard
