= Divine Songs =

Divine Songs may refer to:

- Divine Songs, common name for Divine Songs Attempted in Easy Language for the Use of Children by Isaac Watts
- Divine Songs (Swamini Turiyasangitananda album), by the artist formerly known as Alice Coltrane
