= Crescent (John Coltrane album) =

Studio album by John Coltrane
- Released: July 1964
- Recorded: April 27 and June 1, 1964
- Studio: Van Gelder (Englewood Cliffs)
- Genres: Avant-garde jazz; post-bop; modal jazz
- Length: 40:10
- Label: Impulse! A-66
- Producer: Bob Thiele

John Coltrane chronology
Coltrane's Sound (1964)	Crescent (1964)	A Love Supreme (1965)

Professional ratings
Review scores
Source	Rating
AllMusic	4.5/5 stars
Entertainment Weekly	(positive)
The Penguin Guide to Jazz	3.5/4 stars
The Rolling Stone Jazz Record Guide	4/5 stars
The Village Voice	(positive)

Crescent is a studio album by the jazz musician and composer John Coltrane. It was released in July 1964 through the label Impulse!. Alongside Coltrane on tenor saxophone, the album features McCoy Tyner (piano), Jimmy Garrison (double bass) and Elvin Jones (drums) playing original Coltrane compositions.

Coltrane does not solo at all on side two of the original LP; the ballad "Lonnie's Lament" instead features a long bass solo by Garrison. The album's closing track is an improvisational feature for Jones (with sparse melodic accompaniment from Coltrane's tenor sax and Garrison's bass at the song's beginning and end): Coltrane continued to explore drum/saxophone duets in live performances with this group and on subsequent recordings such as the posthumously released Interstellar Space (with Rashied Ali).

== Legacy ==
An earlier version of "Lonnie's Lament" appears on Afro-Blue Impressions, and an almost hour-long version of "Crescent" was recorded on Live in Japan. The entire album was collected on The Classic Quartet: The Complete Impulse! Recordings. Coltrane later recorded the song "After the Crescent", which appeared on 1978's To the Beat of a Different Drum.

The title track was later covered by Alice Coltrane for 2004's Translinear Light and McCoy Tyner on his 1991 album Soliloquy. Tyner recorded it again live for the albums McCoy Tyner Plays John Coltrane: Live at the Village Vanguard and Live at Sweet Basil. Guitarist Steve Lukather is the soloist on the version recorded for the 2005 tribute album A Guitar Supreme. The SFJAZZ Collective covered four of the songs on their SFJAZZ Collective 2, with Nicholas Payton and Joshua Redman soloing on the title track.

Garrison's widow recalled that this album along with A Love Supreme were the two he listened to the most.

== Track listing ==
All songs composed by John Coltrane and published by Jowcol Music (BMI).

=== Side one ===
No.	Title	Length
1.	"Crescent"	8:41
2.	"Wise One"	9:00
3.	"Bessie's Blues"	3:22
Total length:		21:03

=== Side two ===
No.	Title	Length
1.	"Lonnie's Lament"	11:45
2.	"The Drum Thing"	7:22
Total length:		19:07 40:10

== Personnel ==
John Coltrane Quartet

- John Coltrane – tenor saxophone
- McCoy Tyner – piano
- Jimmy Garrison – double bass
- Elvin Jones – drums

Production

- Bob Thiele – production
- Rudy Van Gelder – recording and mixing
- Nat Hentoff – liner notes

Compact Disc release

- Michael Cuscuna – production and liner notes
- Eric Labson – digital remastering
- Joe Alper – photography
- Chuck Stewart – photography

== Charts ==
Chart performance for Crescent
Chart (2022)	Peak position
Belgian Albums (Ultratop Wallonia)	101
German Albums (Offizielle Top 100)	38

== See also ==
- Blue World, an album recorded between Crescent and A Love Supreme released in 2019
