= Universal Consciousness =

Studio album by Alice Coltrane
- Released: September 1971
- Recorded: 6 April – 19 June 1971
- Genres: Spiritual jazz; avant-garde jazz; free jazz
- Length: 36:36
- Label: Impulse! Records
- Producers: Alice Coltrane, Ed Michel and Brian Konairz

Alice Coltrane chronology
Journey in Satchidananda (1971)	Universal Consciousness (1971)	World Galaxy (1972)

Universal Consciousness is the fifth studio album by the American jazz musician Alice Coltrane, released in September 1971 on Impulse! Records. The album was recorded from April to June 1971 at A & R Recording in New York City and the Coltrane home studios in Dix Hills, New York.

== Recording and production ==
Universal Consciousness was recorded shortly after Coltrane returned from a trip to India, and was the first album on which she is heard playing the Wurlitzer organ. In an interview, she related her decision to use the instrument to her interest in Hindustani classical music, comparing its sound to that of the harmonium and tanpura. Her introduction to the organ also marked a turning point in her outlook as a musician; referring to the fact that the instrument has "two or three manuals and complete bass in the pedals," she recalled: "when I began to play the organ, there came the freedom and understanding that I would never have to depend on anyone else musically."

Coltrane appears on harp and organ, and is joined by bassist Jimmy Garrison; drummers Jack DeJohnette, Rashied Ali, and Clifford Jarvis; and, on three tracks, a quartet of violinists playing parts arranged by Coltrane and transcribed by Ornette Coleman.

== Releases ==
The album was originally released by Impulse! Records in 1971. It was the first in a series of three albums (preceding World Galaxy and Lord of Lords) on which Coltrane appeared with an ensemble of strings.

In 2011, Impulse! reissued the album, along with Lord of Lords, as part of a compilation titled Universal Consciousness/Lord of Lords.

== Reception ==
Professional ratings
Review scores
Source	Rating
AllMusic	4.5/5 stars
DownBeat	5/5 stars
The Penguin Guide to Jazz Recordings	3/4 stars
Pitchfork	10/10
The Vinyl District	A+

In a retrospective review for AllMusic, Thom Jurek wrote: "This is art of the highest order, conceived by a brilliant mind, poetically presented in exquisite collaboration by divinely inspired musicians and humbly offered as a gift to listeners. It is a true masterpiece".

The authors of The Penguin Guide to Jazz Recordings called the album "perhaps her finest achievement on record," and described her harp and organ playing as "superlative." They stated: "the personnels reflect quite distinct musical approaches and Alice Coltrane's conviction that every piece of music had its own sufficient orchestra."

Bill Shoemaker of Jazz Times described Universal Consciousness as "an enduring album and arguably Alice Coltrane's masterpiece," calling her debut on organ "stunning," and noting how the instrument "accentuates the Bud Powell-inspired chops" and "immaculate articulation."

Matthew Fiander of PopMatters commented: "The album is a beautiful, if challenging, sound, one that seems to carry all of Alice Coltrane’s musical interests and her devotion to faith and to her husband's memory, and the results are jarring but joyous."

The Vinyl District's Joseph Neff called the album "a truly extraordinary record," and praised its "assurance, lucidity, and mastery of scale and instrumentation." He noted that the omission of horns is more than outweighed by the presence of "an exceptional band," and by the "spaced-out edginess of Coltrane's organ."

Fact listed the album as the third greatest of the 1970s with Drummer and contributor Eli Keszler citing it as a major influence and commenting: "She managed to merge the zeitgeist into one swelling ball of energy – fusing modal jazz, ecstatic rituals, electronics, eastern influence, multi-directional rhythms and studio experimentation with avant-garde western classical..".

== Track listing ==
Side A
No.	Title	Length
1.	"Universal Consciousness"	5:06
2.	"Battle at Armageddon"	7:20
3.	"O Allah"	5:00

Side B
No.	Title	Length
4.	"Hare Krishna"	8:14
5.	"Sita Ram"	4:47
6.	"The Ankh of Amen-Ra"	6:09
Total length:		36:36

== Personnel ==
- Alice Coltrane – harp, organ
- Jimmy Garrison – double bass (1, 3, 4, 5)
- Jack DeJohnette – drums (1, 3, 4)
- Clifford Jarvis – drums (4, 5), percussion (4)
- Rashied Ali – drums (2, 6), wind chimes (6)
- Tulsi – tanpura (4, 5)
- John Blair, Julius Brand, Leroy Jenkins, Joan Kalisch – violin (1, 3, 4)

String arrangements on tracks 1, 3 and 4 by Coltrane. Tracks 4 and 5 arranged by Coltrane. Transcriptions on tracks 1, 3 and 4 by Ornette Coleman.

Produced by Alice Coltrane, Ed Michel and Brian Konairz. Engineers at Dix Hills were W. Barneke and Roy Musgnug. Engineer at A&R Recording was Tony May. Mixed by Tony May and Ed Michel.

== Charts ==
Chart (1971)	Peak position
US Billboard Top LPs	190
