= Carnegie Hall '71 =

Live album by Alice Coltrane
- Released: 2018
- Recorded: February 21, 1971
- Venue: Carnegie Hall, New York City
- Genre: Free jazz
- Length: 28:35
- Label: Hi Hat; HHCD3093

Alice Coltrane chronology
| Translinear Light (2004) | Carnegie Hall '71 (2018) | Live at the Berkeley Community Theater 1972 (2019) |

Carnegie Hall '71 is a live album by Alice Coltrane. It was recorded at Carnegie Hall in New York City on February 21, 1971, and was released in 2018 by the Hi Hat label. On the album, Coltrane appears on piano and harp, and is joined by saxophonists Pharoah Sanders and Archie Shepp, bassists Jimmy Garrison and Cecil McBee, and drummers Ed Blackwell and Clifford Jarvis.

The album, which consists of a single track documenting a performance of John Coltrane's "Africa", was recorded at a benefit for Swami Satchidanda's Integral Yoga Institute that also featured Laura Nyro and The New Rascals. Regarding Coltrane's band, a concert reviewer for Billboard wrote: "This was one of the greatest assemblages to appear on the Carnegie Hall stage."

In 2021, the album was reissued by the Alternative Fox label with the title Live at Carnegie Hall, 1971.

In 2024, Impulse! Records released a recording of Coltrane's full set, titled The Carnegie Hall Concert.

== Reception ==
Professional ratings
Review scores
| Source | Rating |
|---|---|
| All About Jazz | 3.5/5 stars |

In a review for All About Jazz, Chris May wrote: "The performance has much of the ferocity of the original recording, Africa / Brass," but noted that "Sanders and Shepp cannot match the massed intensity of the original frontline."

Tyler Wilcox of Pitchfork called the album "a wild, extended roller coaster ride through John's 'Africa,' featuring bracing solos from Pharoah Sanders and Archie Shepp," and commented: "Carnegie Hall would never be the same."

A reviewer for Doom and Gloom from the Tomb commented: "It's an intense ride, as perhaps is obvious from the players involved! Recording quality is excellent, capturing an historic occasion."

A writer for Pan African Music stated that the album "is a splendid and ecstatic memento of spiritual jazz with some of its greatest masters. The splitting horns, wild drums, and clamouring piano are a vivid display of virtuosity in motion."

== Track listing ==
| No. | Title | Writer(s) | Length |
|---|---|---|---|
| 1. | "Africa" | John Coltrane | 28:35 |

== Personnel ==
- Alice Coltrane – piano, harp
- Pharoah Sanders – tenor saxophone, soprano saxophone, flute, percussion
- Archie Shepp – tenor saxophone, soprano saxophone, percussion
- Jimmy Garrison – bass
- Cecil McBee – bass
- Ed Blackwell – drums
- Clifford Jarvis – drums
- Kumar Kramer – harmonium
- Tulsi – tamboura
