= Kenny Hagood =

American jazz musician (1926–1989)

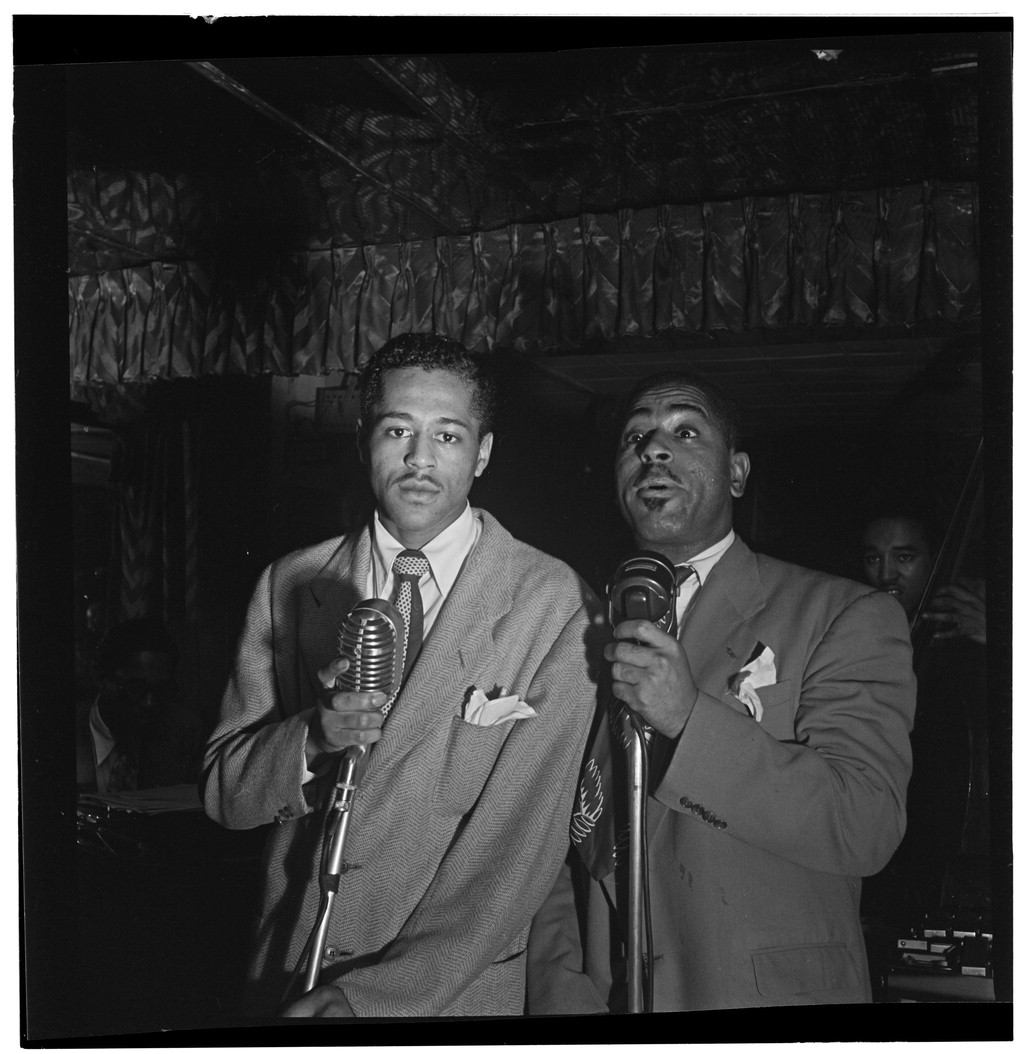
Hagood with Dizzy Gillespie, c. 1946

Kenny "Pancho" Hagood (April 2, 1926 – November 9, 1989) was an American jazz vocalist.

== Biography ==
Hagood was born in Detroit, Michigan, and first sang at the age of 17 with Benny Carter. He sang with the Dizzy Gillespie Orchestra from 1946 to 1948 and then with Tadd Dameron later in 1948. He recorded two pieces with Thelonious Monk in 1948 and "Darn That Dream" with Miles Davis in 1950 (included on Birth of the Cool). He then moved to Chicago and later Paris.

While living in Paris, he had a short-lived marriage in 1960 to Alice McLeod (later known as Alice Coltrane), who gave birth to their daughter Michelle. However, the marriage broke down due to Hagood's struggles with heroin use, and Alice and Michelle returned to the United States. Alice later married John Coltrane, and Michelle took her stepfather's surname.

Hagood recorded with Guy Lafitte in the 1960s. He moved to Los Angeles, California, in 1965 to 1980. In the early 1980s he returned first to Chicago, and later to the Detroit area.

Singer Joy Villa is Hagood's grandniece.

== Discography ==
- Charlie Parker: The Complete Dean Benedetti Recordings (Mosaic, 1947–48)
- Miles Davis: Cool Boppin' - Historic Broadcasts from The Royal Roost 1948/1949 (Fresh Sound; earlier released as LP: Pre-Birth Of The Cool (Cicala Jazz Life))
- Dizzy Gillespie: The Complete RCA Victor Recordings (Bluebird, 1937–49) rel. 1995
- Dizzy Gillespie: Pleyel 48 (Vogue, 1948)
- Dizzy Gillespie: Dizzy Gillespie & His Big band In Concert (GNP Crescendo, 1948)
- Milt Jackson: Wizard of the Vibes (Blue Note 1948-52)
- Miles Davis: Birth Of The Cool (Capitol 1949-50)
- Thelonious Monk: The Complete Blue Note Recordings (Blue Note, 1947–58)
