= Live at the Berkeley Community Theater 1972 =

Live album by Alice Coltrane
- Released: 2019
- Recorded: July 23, 1972
- Venue: Berkeley Community Theater, Berkeley, California
- Genre: Free jazz
- Length: 78:01
- Label: BCT Records; BCT-1972

Alice Coltrane chronology
Carnegie Hall '71 (2018)	Live at the Berkeley Community Theater 1972 (2019)	Kirtan: Turiya Sings (2021)

Live at the Berkeley Community Theater 1972 is a live album by Alice Coltrane. It was recorded at the Berkeley Community Theater in Berkeley, California, in July 1972, and was released as a double album in 2019 by the German label BCT. On the album, Coltrane appears on harp, piano and organ, and is joined by bassist Charlie Haden, sarod player Aashish Khan, tabla player Pranesh Khan, drummer Ben Riley, and a tamboura player listed simply as Bobby W. The recording features three compositions associated with John Coltrane plus a version of Alice Coltrane's "Journey in Satchidananda".

== Reception ==
Professional ratings
Review scores
Source	Rating
All About Jazz	4.5/5 stars

In a review for All About Jazz, Chris May wrote that the album "puts the final nail in the canard that Alice Coltrane was some sort of wafty harp-playing counterbalance to her husband's shamanistic saxophone," and commented: "The four tracks... are high energy work-outs totally in the spirit of John Coltrane at his most unleashed. There are moments of calm, but not many of them."

Aquarium Drunkard's Tyler Wilcox described the album as "beautiful, scary and transcendent" and "a major addition to the Alice Coltrane canon," and remarked that it "features the pioneering musician and her incredible band... journeying fearlessly across the astral plane. Four tracks, four sides! Tons of AC's intense organ hijinks – how did she get that crazy sound?"

Phil Freeman of Burning Ambulance called the album "a recording any Alice Coltrane fan, or fan of jazz at its most adventurous and exploratory, should absolutely hear."

A writer for DownBeat stated that "The version of 'A Love Supreme' here ranks among the tune's most intense."

Quarantine Content's Sam Fleming wrote that the album is "one of the most powerful live recordings you can find, and shows the importance of Coltrane and her vast musical legacy."

A reviewer for the Downtown Music Gallery stated: "The four tracks... show a group in full flight to the cosmos... This show, in particular, is as searing a document of a spiritual group of musicians in full launch to outer space. As intense a performance and recording as we've heard from Alice Coltrane. Raw, propulsive and incendiary."

== Track listing ==
Side A
No.	Title	Writer(s)	Length
1.	"Journey in Satchidananda"	Alice Coltrane	21:24

Side B
No.	Title	Writer(s)	Length
1.	"A Love Supreme"	John Coltrane	18:48

Side C
No.	Title	Writer(s)	Length
1.	"My Favorite Things"	Rodgers and Hammerstein	15:56

Side D
No.	Title	Writer(s)	Length
1.	"Leo"	John Coltrane	21:53
Total length:			78:01

== Personnel ==
- Alice Coltrane – harp, piano, organ
- Charlie Haden – bass
- Aashish Khan – sarod
- Pranesh Khan – tabla, naal
- Ben Riley – drums
- Bobby W. – tamboura, percussion
