= Kirtan: Turiya Sings =

Studio album by Alice Coltrane
- Released: July 16, 2021
- Recorded: June 23, 1981
- Studios: Redwing Sound, Los Angeles, California
- Genres: New-age music, Devotional music
- Length: 61:35
- Labels: Impulse!/UMe/Universal; 359 397
- Producer: Ravi Coltrane

Alice Coltrane chronology
Live at the Berkeley Community Theater 1972 (2019)	Kirtan: Turiya Sings (2021)	The Carnegie Hall Concert (2024)

Kirtan: Turiya Sings is an album by Alice Coltrane. It was recorded on June 23, 1981, at Redwing Sound in Los Angeles, California, and was released in 2021 by Impulse! Records. The album, a stripped-down version of 1982's Turiya Sings, features Coltrane on vocals and organ.

== Background ==
In 1981, Coltrane participated in a marathon fifteen-hour session that yielded recordings that were released the following year as Turiya Sings, a cassette issued via the Vedantic Center's Avatar Book Institute in limited quantities. The album, which was intended for use by students of the Center, features Coltrane singing devotional songs in Sanskrit (her first recorded appearance as a vocalist), accompanied by her Wurlitzer organ with overdubbed strings and synthesizer tracks. Although bootleg versions of the album exist, it was never officially reissued in its original form because the Coltrane family had been unable to find the master synthesizer tracks.

In 2004, three years before Coltrane's death, her son Ravi discovered mixes of Turiya Sings that omitted the overdubbed parts, featuring only her voice and organ. These recordings, derived from the original 24-track masters, were released by Impulse! Records in 2021 with the title Kirtan: Turiya Sings as part of the label's 60th anniversary celebration. (kirtan is a Sanskrit word that means "narrating, reciting, telling.") Ravi reflected, "As her son, growing up and hearing her playing these songs on the very same Wurlitzer you hear on this recording, I recognize this choice maintains the purity and essence of Alice's musical and spiritual vision. In many ways, this new clarity brings these chants to an even higher place."

== Reception ==
Professional ratings
Review scores
Source	Rating
AllMusic	4/5 stars
Pitchfork	8.5/10
DownBeat	4/5 stars
Jazzwise	4/5 stars
Uncut	3.5/5 stars
Beats Per Minute	8/10 stars

In a review for AllMusic, Thom Jurek wrote, "Kirtan: Turiya Sings is more subdued than the original..., but because of the power in Coltrane's singing, it is also deeper emotionally... it resonates with the personal primacy of private devotional prayer... it doesn't displace or replace the original, but adds immeasurably to its meaning and dimension."

Simon Adams of Jazz Journal stated, "this music is not... jazz, for nothing is improvised. It is determinedly inspirational and spiritual, spacious and intense in its devotional task... Its importance... is that while her jazz records released on Impulse! define her career, they do not tell the whole story of the musical life of this most extraordinary and inspiring woman. This album fills that gap."

Pitchfork's Jenn Pelly commented, "Listening to the Kirtan: Turiya Sings recordings feels less like discovering a hissy cassette lost in time than what it must have been like to experience Coltrane leading the songs at one of her legendary Sunday services. Each composition steadily ascends with a charge of aliveness... the music... is concentrated and rigorous, yet simple and full of ease. Like the original Turiya Sings, it's also a pleasure."

Writing for DownBeat, Daniel Margolis remarked, "The music... is spacious and large. Alice's voice has weight and power. The effect is mesmerizing."

In an article for Jazzwise, Kevin Le Gendre wrote, "This is the kind of intimate, meditative music that has both divine inspiration and sublime execution, duly marking out Alice Coltrane-Turiya as an inspiring, singular exponent of both secular and sacred music."

Glide Magazine's Jim Hynes stated, "The immediacy of the recording leaves the listener with some trepidation is to whether it's permissible to violate what is clearly a sacred space as Alice is in her own realm of spirituality and devotion... Alice, long regarded as one of the pillars of spiritual jazz, is at her most deeply spiritual in this setting, one that has only minute traces, if any, associated with jazz."

Britt Robson of JazzTimes commented, "Alice's voice is invested with the commanding purity of faith, of someone who has been tempered by the travails of tragedy and emerged transcendent... The slow shifts of her organ chords contain the gentle sway of the gospel church, and the subtle emphasis changes in her phrasing bring the blues into the ashram."

Writing for Uncut, Richard Williams remarked, "The listener is drawn into a world of solitary devotion... the longer you listen, the more you're drawn in and the less aesthetically confining the music's self-imposed restraints seem."

In a review for Beats Per Minute, Ethan Reis wrote, "The otherworldly feel of the original Turiya Sings is gone, and so we are presented with a sound that is very much of this world... Whereas the Turiya Sings cassette rip floated in lo-fi heaven, the new version is comparatively ascetic, but Alice's voice is gripping in its relative isolation."

The Washington Post's Andy Beta called the album "an entrancing listen, an intimate glimpse of an artist whose greatness has only just been acknowledged in this world," but, concerning the stripped-down nature of the recording, asked "is that what Alice Coltrane wanted others to hear?"

In 2023, Nathan Fielder and Benny Safdie used two tracks, "Jagadishwar" and "Jai Ramachandra", in their Showtime series The Curse, as well as using the album's vibe and style as a guideline for John Medeski's original score for the show, on which Oneohtrix Point Never served as executive producer.

== Track listing ==
Side A
No.	Title	Length
1.	"Jagadishwar"	6:30
2.	"Jai Ramachandra"	6:01
3.	"Krishna Krishna"	5:10

Side B
No.	Title	Length
4.	"Rama Katha"	11:42
5.	"Yamuna Tira Vihari"	8:33

Side C
No.	Title	Length
6.	"Charanam"	6:31
7.	"Govinda Hari"	5:40

Side D
No.	Title	Length
8.	"Hara Siva"	7:02
9.	"Pranadhana"	4:26
Total length:		61:35

== Personnel ==
- Alice Coltrane – vocals, organ
- Ravi Coltrane – reissue producer
- Sita Michelle Coltrane – associate producer
- Ken Druker – executive producer
- Baker Bigsby – recording engineer
- Kevin Reeves – mastering
- Steve Genewick – mixing
