= Clifford Jarvis =

American jazz drummer (1941–1999)

Clifford Osbourne Jarvis (August 26, 1941 – November 26, 1999) was an American hard bop and free jazz drummer, who in the 1980s moved to London, England, where he spent the remainder of his career.

== Biography ==
Clifford Jarvis, the son of Malcom “Shorty” Jarvis was born in Boston, Massachusetts, United States, where he studied at Berklee College of Music in the 1950s.

Moving to New York City, he established himself in jazz between 1959 and 1966, by recording with bebop and hard-bop musicians including Randy Weston, Yusef Lateef, Freddie Hubbard, Barry Harris, Jackie McLean, John Patton, Chet Baker, Kenny Drew, Walter Davis, and Elmo Hope, and playing with Grant Green and Rahsaan Roland Kirk.

He worked and recorded with musicians associated with free jazz, including Sun Ra (from 1962 to 1976), Pharoah Sanders, Sonny Simmons, Alice Coltrane, and Archie Shepp.

During the 1980s, Jarvis moved to England, where he played with younger musicians including Courtney Pine. He also worked as a music educator at Chats Palace Arts Centre in London and Pyramid Arts Development in Dalston. Jarvis continued teaching until his death in 1999.

== Discography ==
=== As sideman ===
With Chet Baker

- Chet Baker Plays the Best of Lerner and Loewe (Riverside, 1959)

With Alice Coltrane

- Carnegie Hall '71 (Hi Hat, 2018)
- The Carnegie Hall Concert (Impulse!, 2024)

With Kenny Drew

- Ruby, My Dear (SteepleChase, 1977)

With Curtis Fuller

- Images of Curtis Fuller (Savoy, 1960)

With Barry Harris

- Newer Than New (Riverside, 1961)
- Chasin' the Bird (Riverside, 1962)

With Elmo Hope

- The Final Sessions (Evidence, 1966 [1996])

With Freddie Hubbard

- Open Sesame (Blue Note, 1960)
- Hub-Tones (Blue Note, 1962)
- Blue Spirits (Blue Note, 1966)

With Jackie McLean

- Right Now! (Blue Note, 1965)

With Archie Shepp

- Little Red Moon (Soul Note, 1985)
- Splashes (L+R, 1987)

With Sonny Simmons

- Burning Spirits (Contemporary, 1971)

With Jukka Syrenius Band

- Memories of tomorrow"( Finland, TCH-LP1, 1983)

With Sun Ra

- When Sun Comes Out (Saturn, 1963)
- Nothing Is (ESP, 1966)

With John Patton

- That Certain Feeling (Blue Note, 1968)

With Randy Weston

- Live at the Five Spot (United Artists, 1959)

With Harry Beckett

- Les Jardins Du Casino (ITM, 1993)
