= Eternity (Alice Coltrane album) =

Studio album by Alice Coltrane
- Released: 1976
- Recorded: 13 August – 15 October 1975
- Genre: Jazz
- Length: 36:37
- Label: Warner Bros.
- Producer: Ed Michel

Alice Coltrane chronology
Illuminations (1974)	Eternity (1976)	Radha-Krsna Nama Sankirtana (1977)

Eternity is an album by Alice Coltrane. It was recorded between August and October 1975 and was released in 1976 by Warner Records, her first release with the label. On the album, Coltrane is joined by ensembles of varying size. It was Coltrane's first album following both her move to California and her decision to become a monastic.

== Reception ==
Professional ratings
Review scores
Source	Rating
AllMusic	4/5 stars
The Penguin Guide to Jazz Recordings	4/4 stars
The Vinyl District	A−

In a review for AllMusic, Thom Jurek praised Coltrane's "ability to open up her own sonic vocabulary and seamlessly create an ensemble context for to [sic] deliver an unpredictable expression of her vision of harmonic convergence," and wrote: "Eternity is ultimately about the universality of tonal language and its complex expressions. It is an enduring recording that was far ahead of its time in 1976 and is only now getting the recognition it deserves."

The authors of The Penguin Guide to Jazz awarded the album a full 4 stars and called it "an unexpectedly good introduction to Turiya's musical philosophy."

Writing for WQXR, James Bennett II commented: "listening to Eternity feels like one is putting in effortless meditative work... Across these six tracks there is a unifying theme: the journey... Each piece is trying to find itself — the music isn't wandering because it's lost. Coltrane has acted with intention, urging each musical element towards discovery so that it may find what it really is, and soundly rest in the security of that knowledge."

Jennifer Lucy Allan of The Guardian stated that the album is "short and lacks the coherence of her other releases," but praised "Spiritual Eternal", writing: "the huge Wurlitzer solo swaddled in strings, like the theme tune to someone parading down a palatial staircase in a silken gown... What swing! What elegance!"

In an article for Spectrum Culture, Daniel Bromfield noted that the album was "experimental in terms of Coltrane putting her new tools to the test on wax for the first time," but remarked: "It's meant to be a Sketches of Spain sort of thing, but... that organ sound is better when it does the bulk of the sonic load-bearing."

Phyl Garland of Ebony commented: "Much of the music here is infused with the ethereal quality we have come to expect of her... But though her head is to the sky, her feet seem to be more firmly planted in earthly melodies than on some other efforts."

The Vinyl District's Joseph Neff stated that Coltrane's playing is "as gorgeous as ever," and noted that "the record's most impressive quality lies in how seamlessly everything unwinds, the flow serving to nicely deflate the theory that this strain of '70s progressive jazz was unfocused and undisciplined."

== Track list ==
Side A
No.	Title	Length
1.	"Spiritual Eternal"	2:57
2.	"Wisdom Eye"	3:10
3.	"Los Caballos"	11:27

Side B
No.	Title	Length
4.	"Om Supreme"	9:28
5.	"Morning Worship"	3:36
6.	"The Rite of Spring" (excerpted from The Rite of Spring by Igor Stravinsky)	5:59
Total length:		36:37

== Personnel ==
Track 1

- Alice Coltrane – organ
- Fred Jackson – flute
- Hubert Laws – flute
- Jerome Richardson – soprano saxophone
- Jackie Kelso – tenor saxophone
- Terry Harrington – tenor saxophone
- Don Christlieb – bassoon
- Jack Marsh – bassoon
- Oscar Brashear – trumpet
- Paul Hubinon – trumpet
- Charlie Loper – trombone
- George Bohanon – trombone
- Alan Robinson – French horn
- Marylin Robinson – French horn
- Tommy Johnson – tuba
- Gordon Marron – violin
- Murray Adler – violin
- Nathan Kaproff – violin
- Polly Sweeney – violin
- Sid Sharp – violin
- Bill Kurasch – violin
- Mike Nowack – viola
- Pamela Goldsmith – viola
- Rollice Dale – viola
- Anne Goodman – cello
- Jackie Lustgarten – cello
- Ray Kelley – cello
- Charlie Haden – bass
- Ben Riley – drums

Track 2

- Alice Coltrane – harp

Track 3

- Alice Coltrane – organ
- Charlie Haden – bass
- Ben Riley – drums
- Armando Peraza – congas

Track 4

- Alice Coltrane – electric piano
- Deborah Coomer – vocals
- Edward Cansino – vocals
- Jean Packer – vocals
- Paul Vorwerk – vocals
- Susan Judy – vocals
- William Yeomans – vocals
- Carlos Santana – timbales

Track 5

- Alice Coltrane – organ, tambura
- Charlie Haden – bass
- Ben Riley – drums
- Armando Peraza – congas
- Carlos Santana – percussion
- Ed Michel – bells

Track 6

- Alice Coltrane – organ, timpani, cymbal
- Louise Di Tullio – piccolo
- Fred Jackson – flute
- Hubert Laws – flute
- Jerome Richardson – alto flute
- Jackie Kelso – clarinet
- Terry Harrington – clarinet
- Julian Spear – bass clarinet
- Gene Cipriano – oboe
- John Ellis – oboe
- Ernie Watts – English horn
- Don Christlieb – bassoon
- Jack Marsh – bassoon
- Jo Ann Caldwell – contrabassoon
- Oscar Brashear – trumpet
- Paul Hubinon – trumpet
- Charlie Loper – trombone
- George Bohanon – trombone
- Alan Robinson – French horn
- Art Maebe – French horn
- Marylin Robinson – French horn
- Vince De Rosa – French horn
- Tommy Johnson – tuba
- Gordon Marron – violin
- Murray Adler – violin
- Nathan Kaproff – violin
- Polly Sweeney – violin
- Sid Sharp – violin
- Bill Kurasch – violin
- Mike Nowack – viola
- Pamela Goldsmith – viola
- Rollice Dale – viola
- Anne Goodman – cello
- Jackie Lustgarten – cello
- Ray Kelley – cello
- Charlie Haden – bass
- Ben Riley – bass, percussion, gong
