= Transcendence (Alice Coltrane album) =

Studio album by Alice Coltrane
- Released: 1977
- Recorded: 5 May to 18 May 1977
- Genre: Jazz
- Length: 37:42
- Label: Warner Brothers
- Producer: Ed Michel

Alice Coltrane chronology
Radha-Krsna Nama Sankirtana (1977)	Transcendence (1977)	Transfiguration (1978)

Transcendence is an album by Alice Coltrane, recorded in California in May 1977, and released later that year by Warner Brothers Records. On the album, Coltrane is heard in a variety of instrumental combinations. "Vrindavana" is a solo track, while on "Radhe-Shyam" and "Transcendence", Coltrane appears on harp accompanied by a string ensemble. The remaining tracks are among the earliest examples of her use of Hindu devotional hymns called bhajans, and feature Coltrane on keyboards joined by large groups of singers who also clap and play hand instruments.

== Critical reception ==
Professional ratings
Review scores
Source	Rating
AllMusic	4/5 stars
DownBeat	3/5 stars
The Penguin Guide to Jazz Recordings	2/4 stars
The Vinyl District	B+

In a review for AllMusic, Thom Jurek wrote: "the vision on display here is not so much a grand musical one as it is an intensely focused spiritual one... it makes for a challenging but thoroughly engaging listen, wherein moods, modes, ambiences, and densities are offered as meditative spaces for the listener... Transcendence is another chapter in a body of work by Ms. Coltrane that was not generally understood until the 21st century, where it received the acclaim it so richly deserved. As time passes, it may actually be instructive to a new generation of musicians and listeners -- a love supreme indeed."

The authors of The Penguin Guide to Jazz Recordings called the album "deeply personal and profoundly felt, but hard to contextualize" within a jazz framework.

Joseph Neff of The Vinyl District stated that the "sustained dose of florid harp and strings" of the first few tracks is counterbalanced by the remaining vocal-oriented tracks, which have "gospel edge that cuts a little deeper than it did on her two prior outings."

Writing for Spectrum Culture, Daniel Bromfield commented: "We can easily see how her eye for architectural detail passed down to her nephew Flying Lotus. She plays the harp for much of the album... and it vaults through the air between its bearings like the arches in some decadent Gothic church."

In an article for Red Bull Music Academy, Britt Robson called "Vrindavana" "mesmerizing," but noted that "the song-chants with her students on the back end of the album are the real reward, for they crystallize the devotional passions of gospel testimony and Hindu bliss in a riveting synergy."

== Tracklist ==
Side A
No.	Title	Length
1.	"Radhe-Shyam"	6:59
2.	"Vrindavana"	4:03
3.	"Transcendence"	5:56

Side B
No.	Title	Length
4.	"Sivaya"	4:49
5.	"Ghana Nila"	6:26
6.	"Bhaja Govindam"	4:33
7.	"Sri Nrsimha"	4:56
Total length:		37:42

== Personnel ==
- Alice Coltrane – electric piano, harp, organ, piano, tamboura, tambourine, wind chimes
- David Montagu – violin
- Jay Rosen – violin
- Murray Adler – violin
- Pamela Goldsmith – viola
- Fred Seykoura – cello
