= Jordannah Elizabeth Graham-Mayer =

American musician and journalist (born 1986)

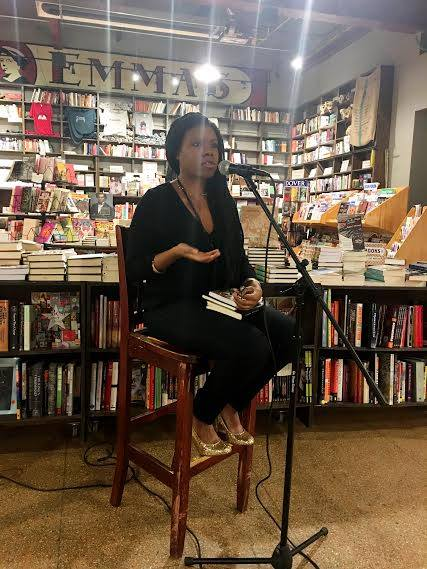
- Elizabeth at Red Emma's book store in Baltimore
- Born: October 16, 1986 (age 39); Baltimore, Maryland, U.S.
- Occupations: Author, journalist, lecturer and musician
- Website: jewriting.com

Jordannah Elizabeth Graham-Mayer (born October 16, 1986) is an American musician, journalist, lecturer, music critic, author and screenwriter.

She is the author of She Raised Her Voice! 50 Black Women Who Sang Their Way into Music History (2021, Hachette Book Group), which won a Jazz Journalists Association (JJA) Jazz Award, and A Child’s Introduction to Hip-Hop (2023, Workman). She has written for and contributed to outlets including the New York Amsterdam News, NPR affiliates, Village Voice, DownBeat, Bandcamp Daily, and others, and has taught music business at The New School's College of Performing Arts.

== Career ==
Graham-Mayer started her professional writing career in 2013 with bylines in Vice Magazine, Nerve.com and Bitch Media. In October 2013, she became a regular contributing writer and entertainment reporter for the New York Amsterdam News. In subsequent years, she wrote for a number of Bay Area publications including San Francisco Bay Guardian, East Bay Express, and SF Weekly, and other outlets including LA Weekly, Ms. Magazine, PopSugar, and NPR Music.

Her writing consists of interviews, music journalism, personal essays, articles on healing in relationships and trauma, and literary journalism.

She has taught writing and journalism workshops at the Maryland Institute College of Art and Center for New Music in San Francisco and lectured at Pratt Institute in Brooklyn, New York, and De Montfort University in Leicester, England. She was a guest journalist at Harvard University's Black Lives Matter: Music, Race, and Justice Conference in February 2017 and has also moderated panels on literature and film at the Baltimore Book Festival and Creative Alliance in Baltimore, Maryland. In April 2021, she was a keynote speaker and panelist at the Columbia University's Music Scholarship Conference.

Graham-Mayer has taught music business at the School of Jazz and Contemporary Music.

== Books ==
- Don't Lose Track, Vol. 1: 40 Selected Articles, Essays and Q&As (Zer0 Books, 2016, ISBN 9781785351938)
- The Warmest Low (Chapbook One) Limited Edition Two (Publik / Private Small Press, 2017)
- She Raised Her Voice!: 50 Black Women Who Sang Their Way into Music History (Running Press Kids, 2021, ISBN 9780762475162)
- A Child's Introduction to Hip Hop (Black Dog & Leventhal, 2023, ISBN 9780762481026)
- Ain't But a Few of Us: Black Music Writers Tell Their Stories (Contributor, Duke University Press, 2022, ISBN 9781478023661)
- The Jazz Omnibus: 21st-Century Photos and Writings by Members of the Jazz Journalists Association (Cymbal Press, 2024, ISBN 9781955604185)
- V: 14 Poets (Publik / Private Small Press, 2025)
