= Illuminations (Alice Coltrane and Carlos Santana album) =

Studio album by Santana & Coltrane
- Released: September 1974
- Genre: Free jazz
- Length: 35:40
- Label: Columbia
- Producers: Turiya Alice Coltrane, Devadip Carlos Santana, Tom Coster

Carlos Santana chronology
| Santana's Greatest Hits (1974) | Illuminations (1974) | Borboletta (1974) |

Alice Coltrane chronology
| Lord of Lords (1972) | Illuminations (1974) | Eternity (1976) |

Illuminations is a 1974 collaboration between Alice Coltrane and Carlos Santana (under their Indian names "Turiya" and "Devadip", respectively). Saxophonist/flautist Jules Broussard, keyboardist Tom Coster, drummer Jack DeJohnette, percussionist Armando Peraza and bassist Dave Holland also contributed to the album.

Alice Coltrane performs on harp, piano, and Wurlitzer electric organ and arranged and conducted the string section. Carlos Santana plays his electric guitar in a more minimal style than usual, using feedback, sustain and simple melodic statements to create atmosphere and to lend space to the other instruments. The album is all instrumental, with lengthy solos from most of the participants.

The string section introduction to "Angel of Air" was sampled by the Cinematic Orchestra for use on the track "All That You Give", which appeared on their 2002 album Every Day. This is the first of three Santana albums (the others being Oneness and The Swing of Delight) to be released under his Sanskrit name Devadip, given to him by guru Sri Chinmoy.

The usual 2 channel stereo version of the album was also released in 1974 in a 4 channel quadraphonic version. In 2017, Illuminations was reissued by the Dutton Vocalion label in the UK in Super Audio CD format containing both the stereo and quadraphonic mixes.

Santana biographer Marc Shapiro stated that the guitarist was "once again the child" during the recording session, plying Coltrane with requests for stories about her late husband. Santana later recalled: "the music really took me farther away from that classic Santana sound than almost any other recording—farther away but closer to where my heart was."

== Remix ==
In 2001, Bill Laswell, responsible for remixes of albums by Bob Marley and Miles Davis, mixed and remixed excerpts of Santana's Illuminations and Love Devotion Surrender, on an album called Divine Light.

== Reception ==
Professional ratings
Review scores
| Source | Rating |
|---|---|
| AllMusic | 2/5 stars |
| Christgau's Record Guide | C− |

In a review for AllMusic, William Ruhlmann wrote: "Columbia Records could not have been pleased at Santana's determined drift into esoteric jazz: Illuminations was the first of the nine Santana-related albums so far released in the U.S. not to go gold."

A reviewer for Billboard called the album "a totally cosmic record," and stated that it "should turn a lot of people onto this form of music."

Saxon Baird of Red Bull Music Academy noted that the album is "as strange and fascinating as the pairing" of Coltrane and Santana would suggest, and called "Angel of Sunlight" the album's centerpiece, commenting: "The nearly 15-minute, feverish free-jazz number is heavily indebted to John Coltrane's late output... But if much of the saxophonist's late work felt like a musician in search, Santana and Alice Coltrane here are also musicians journeying in the same style."

Writing for All About Jazz, Rob Caldwell described Illuminations as "quite a bold album," and stated that it is "all about drama and grandiosity." He remarked: "At times bordering on New Age, it's much too adventurous to be pigeonholed as such and just when it seems to get too syrupy or cosmic, it veers into free jazz."

A writer for Aquarium Drunkard commented: "Despite his instantly recognizable tone and reputation for wailing, Santana's playing is minimal and humble, stripped to its melodic core. Here, he sets a new benchmark for electric guitar in a spiritual jazz context, while also providing the soaring counterpoint to Alice Coltrane's lush orchestrations."

Buckley Mayfield of Jive Time Records remarked that the album "is all about transmitting blazing beams of enlightenment into listeners' minds," and stated that Illuminations and Love Devotion Surrender "stand as [Santana's] creative peaks."

A reviewer for Overgrown Path wrote: "It is, of course, very easy to dismiss this album as New Age whimsy. But that denies the primordial and mystical power of sound to transform, and it is elitist and myopic to contend that this transformative power is the exclusive property of the masterworks of the Western classical music."

== Track listing ==
Side A
| No. | Title | Writer(s) | Length |
|---|---|---|---|
| 1. | "Guru Sri Chinmoy Aphorism" | Sri Chinmoy | 1:11 |
| 2. | "Angel of Air / Angel of Water" | Coster-Santana | 9:55 |
| 3. | "Bliss: The Eternal Now" | Alice Coltrane | 5:33 |
| Total length: | | | 16:39 |

Side B
| No. | Title | Writer(s) | Length |
|---|---|---|---|
| 4. | "Angel of Sunlight" | Coster-Santana | 14:43 |
| 5. | "Illuminations" | Coster-Santana | 4:18 |
| Total length: | | | 19:01 35:40 |

== Personnel ==
- Alice Coltrane - piano, harp, Wurlitzer electric organ (B1)
- Carlos Santana - electric guitar
- Dave Holland - acoustic bass (A2, B1)
- James Bond - acoustic bass, bass guitar
- Jack DeJohnette - drums & percussion (A2, B1)
- Tom Coster - electric piano, Hammond B-3 organ (A2, B1–2)
- Jules Broussard - soprano saxophone, alto flute (A2, B1)
- Phil Brown - tanpura (B1)
- Armando Peraza - conga drums (B1)
- Phil Ford - tablas (B1)
- String section arranged and conducted by Alice Coltrane

=== String ensamble ===
- Concert master (violin) - Murray Adler
- Violins - Ron Folsom, Bill Henderson, Nathan Kaproff, Gordon Marron, Paul Shure, Charles Veal
- Cellos - Anne Goodman, Glenn Grab, Jackie Lustgarten, Fred Seykora
- Violas - Marilyn Baker, Myer Bello, Rollice Dale, Alan Harshman, Myra Kestenbaum, David Schwartz

== Charts ==
| Chart (1974) | Peak position |
|---|---|
| Australian Albums (Kent Music Report) | 75 |
| UK Albums (Official Charts) | 40 |
| US Billboard Top LPs & Tape | 76 |
| US Soul LPs (Billboard) | 33 |
