= Radha-Krsna Nama Sankirtana =

Studio album by Alice Coltrane
- Released: 1977
- Recorded: August 1976
- Studio: The Record Plant, Sausalito, California; The Village Recorder, Los Angeles, California
- Genre: Jazz, Devotional
- Length: 37:50
- Label: Warner Bros; BS 2986
- Producer: Ed Michel

Alice Coltrane chronology
Eternity (1976)	Radha-Krsna Nama Sankirtana (1977)	Transcendence (1977)

Radha-Krsna Nama Sankirtana is an album by Alice Coltrane. It was recorded in California in August 1976, and was released in 1977 by Warner Bros. On the album, Coltrane is joined by students from the Vedantic Center, who sing, clap, and play hand percussion, and by her daughter Sita Michelle Coltrane and son Arjuna John Coltrane Jr.

Radha-Krsna Nama Sankirtana was the first album on which Coltrane featured her students.

== Reception ==
Professional ratings
Review scores
Source	Rating
AllMusic	3.5/5 stars
The Penguin Guide to Jazz	3/4 stars
The Vinyl District	B+

In a review for AllMusic, Thom Jurek wrote: "This album was all but ignored upon release. If reviewed at all, it was (usually) met with undeserved chauvinistic male scorn. The music on Radha-Krsna Nama Sankirtana is wholly original (as are all Alice Coltrane's works), complete as a document of spiritual devotion and musical acumen."

The authors of The Penguin Guide to Jazz Recordings called the album "deeply personal and profoundly felt, but hard to contextualize" within a jazz framework.

Colin Buttimer of the BBC singled out "Om Namah Sivaya" for praise, calling it "a gorgeous nineteen minutes that stand a mile out in terms of event, exploration, inter-communication... music that makes you sit up and take notice."

Joseph Neff of The Vinyl District stated that, with the album, Coltrane "move[d] away from the jazz core in earnest," and suggested that "Om Namah Sivaya" may bring to mind Ornette Coleman's recordings with his son Denardo.

In an article for Spectrum Culture, Daniel Bromfield noted that most of the album's "sparks of genius come in the background: odd chords backing the Sanskrit chants, canny moments when the call-and-response repetition of the Hindu music starts to tangle limbs with black church music." Regarding "Om Namah Sivaya," he commented: "The sound of her instrument changes in sudden, eerie, ramshackle ways, as if she's accidentally switched the settings—or maybe something else has descended on the room and done it for her."

== Track listing ==
Side A
No.	Title	Length
1.	"Govinda Jai Jai"	5:44
2.	"Ganesha"	2:42
3.	"Prema Muditha"	4:32
4.	"Hare Krishna"	5:53

Side B
No.	Title	Length
5.	"Om Namah Sivaya"	18:59
Total length:		37:50

== Personnel ==
- Alice Coltrane – organ, electric piano, harp, percussion
- Sita Michelle Coltrane – tamboura (track 2)
- Arjuna John Coltrane Jr. – drums (track 5)
- Students of the Vedantic Center – backing vocals, percussion, handclaps (tracks 1, 3, and 4)
