= Infinity (John Coltrane album) =

Remix album by John Coltrane
- Released: September 1972
- Recorded: June 16, 1965 (#2); Van Gelder Studio, Englewood Cliffs; September 22, 1965 (#3); Van Gelder Studio, Englewood Cliffs; February 2, 1966 (#1, 4); Coast Recorders, San Francisco
- Genre: Jazz
- Length: 36:47
- Labels: Impulse! AS-9225
- Producer: Ed Michel

John Coltrane chronology
Sun Ship (1971)	Infinity (1972)	Concert in Japan (1973)

Infinity is an album credited to John Coltrane, released on Impulse! Records in 1972. It features overdubs with strings of Coltrane's pieces recorded in 1965 and 1966, at the hands of Alice Coltrane. Her controversial "re-imagining" of her husband's late works was criticised by both fans and critics, as she took his original performances and superimposed them over lush orchestral backgrounds and re-dubbed rhythm section parts, as well as recording new solos on piano, organ, harp and timpani.

Tracks 2 and 3 were originally recorded by the "classic quartet" (John Coltrane, McCoy Tyner, Jimmy Garrison, Elvin Jones) in 1965, while tracks 1 and 4 were recorded by Coltrane's later ensemble (Pharoah Sanders, Alice Coltrane, Jimmy Garrison, Rashied Ali, and extra percussionist Ray Appleton). On the 1965 tracks, Alice retained the original rhythm section parts, adding string and tamboura parts only, but on the 1966 tracks, Garrison's bass parts were replaced with new recordings by Charlie Haden, and she herself recorded new solos.

Regarding the criticism she received concerning the overdubs and alterations, Alice Coltrane reflected: "Some people didn't like the addition of strings... They said, 'We know that the original recording didn’t have any strings, so why didn't you leave it as it was?' I replied, 'Were you there? Did you hear [John's] commentary and what he had to say?'... We had a conversation about every detail; [John] was showing me how the piece could include other sounds, blends, tonalities and resonances such as strings. He talked about cosmic sounds, higher dimensions, astral levels and other worlds, and realms of music and sound that I could feel."

== Reception ==
Professional ratings
Review scores
Source	Rating
AllMusic	3/5 stars

Reviewer Stewart Smith wrote "By pairing her own music with her husband's, Alice announced her intention to continue on the visionary path they had mapped out together...The results are fascinating and rather gorgeous, offering a glimpse where John might have gone next had he lived." AllMusic reviewer Brian Olewnick wrote: "the ultimate result is an unusual and oddly attractive work. The juxtaposition of the fiery, very free playing of late Coltrane against the dreamy, consonant strings is seductively appealing and one might even make the argument that, given the increasing mystical proclivities of his later years and the presence of Eastern instruments in his ensemble, he may well have approved... Whatever problems the Coltrane ideologue may have with his wife's embroideries, Infinity still deserves a place in his/her collection."

== Track listing ==
All compositions by John Coltrane.

Side A
No.	Title	Length
1.	"Peace on Earth"	8:33
2.	"Living Space"	10:28

Side B
No.	Title	Length
1.	"Joy"	7:54
2.	"Leo"	9:52
Total length:		36:47

Overdubs recorded at The Village Recorder, Los Angeles, California, in 1972.

== Musicians ==
=== Original performances by ===
- John Coltrane – soprano & tenor sax, bass clarinet, bells, percussion (4)
- Pharoah Sanders – tenor sax, flute, piccolo, tambourine, percussion (4)
- Alice Coltrane – piano (1, 4), organ (1,4)
- Rashied Ali – drums (1, 4)
- Ray Appleton – percussion (1, 4)
- McCoy Tyner – piano (2, 3)
- Jimmy Garrison – bass (2, 3)
- Elvin Jones – drums (2, 3)

=== Overdubbed with arrangements featuring ===
- Alice Coltrane – piano (1, 4), harp (1, 2, 3), organ (1, 4), vibraphone (1, 3), tamboura (2), timpani (4)
- Charlie Haden – bass (1, 3, 4)
- Joan Chapman – tamboura (2)
- Oran Coltrane – bells (2)

=== String orchestra ===
- James Getzoff, Gerald Vinci, Gordon Marron, Michael White – violin
- Rollice Dale, Myra Kestenbaum – viola
- Jesse Ehrlich, Edgar Lustgarten – cello
- Murray Adler – concertmaster
