= Turiya Sings =

1982 album of Sanskrit songs by Alice Coltrane

Studio album by Alice Coltrane
- Released: 1982 (rereleased 2021)
- Recorded: 1981
- Genre: New-age music, Devotional music
- Label: Privately released, rereleased by Impulse! Records

Alice Coltrane chronology
Transfiguration (1978)	Turiya Sings (1982)	Divine Songs (1987)

Turiya Sings is an album by Alice Coltrane, recorded in 1981 during a marathon fifteen-hour session, and initially released in 1982 on privately-pressed cassette for her Vedantic Center's students. The album features recordings of devotional Sanskrit songs sung by Coltrane, accompanied by overdubbed strings and synthesised instrumentation, and marks her first recorded appearance as a vocalist.

Although unofficial LP and CD versions of the album exist, it was never officially reissued in its original form because the Coltrane family has been unable to locate the master synthesizer tracks. However, the album was rereleased in July 2021 by Impulse! Records as Kirtan: Turiya Sings, which is based on a 1981 mix that lacks the original release's overdubbed synthesizer and string backings.

== Reception ==
Professional ratings
Review scores
Source	Rating
The Virgin Encyclopedia of Jazz	3/5 stars

In an article for Pitchfork, Jenn Pelly wrote: "In the aching shimmer of these hymns, which evoke both South Indian classical music and the Black church, you can hear Coltrane's life coursing through: her journey from gospel accompanist to jazz prodigy, the drama of the European classical music she loved, the soulful melodies of her Detroit youth, grief and exaltation. Yet the power of this music is elemental."

Writing for The Washington Post, Andy Beta commented: "These are ancient Indian hymns swaddled in the newfangled synthesizer technology of the time. It's a speedball of sound, both mystical and dinky. Coltrane sings in Sanskrit, but it instantly leaps continents and epochs to hit like a country blues, voicing the anguish and ache of the present moment. It feels ethereal and beyond, but also deeply sorrowful. You don't need to understand Sanskrit to know the suffering that she conveys here."

Red Bull Music Academy's Britt Robson called Turiya Sings a "resplendent outlier" in Coltrane's recorded output, "arguably her most peaceful and soothing album," and praised her "hauntingly beautiful vocals."

Will Sheff, leader of the band Okkervil River, stated: "there's something so beautiful about hearing a musician do something where their soul is reaching out to God and they put it out to people who share the same faith as they do as a prayer aid... At no point in that process does 'I want to be rich' or 'I want to be famous' or 'I want to be well-thought-of' come into that... That's very refreshing because those are the biggest prizes of our culture right now."

Virginia Lee of Yoga Journal stated that Coltrane "brings all her musical talent... to life" on the album, and described it as "ethereal and enchanting," calling for "total surrender on the part of the listener." She concluded: "This music is a delicious experience."

== Tracklist ==
Side A
No.	Title	Length
1.	"Jagadishwar"
2.	"Jai Ramachandra"
3.	"Krishna Krishna"
4.	"Rama Katha"

Side B
No.	Title	Length
5.	"Yamuna Tira Vihari"
6.	"Charanam"
7.	"Govinda Hari"
8.	"Hara Siva"
9.	"Pranadhana"

== Personnel ==
- Alice Coltrane – vocals, organ, Oberheim OB-8
- Murray Adler – concert master of strings
