= A Monastic Trio =

Studio album by Alice Coltrane
- Released: December 1968
- Recorded: January 29 & June 6, 1968
- Studios: John Coltrane home studios, Dix Hills, New York
- Genres: Post-bop, avant-garde jazz
- Length: 38:17 (original LP)
- Label: Impulse! Records
- Producer: Alice Coltrane

Alice Coltrane chronology
A Monastic Trio (1968)	Huntington Ashram Monastery (1969)

A Monastic Trio is the first solo album by Alice Coltrane. It was recorded in 1968 at the John Coltrane Home in Dix Hills, New York, and was released later that year by Impulse! Records. On the album, Coltrane appears playing the piano and harp, and is joined by saxophonist Pharoah Sanders, bassist Jimmy Garrison, and drummer Rashied Ali, all of whom were members of John Coltrane's last quintet. Drummer Ben Riley also appears on one track. The album was reissued on CD in 1998 with three additional tracks, one of which is a piano solo recorded in 1967.

The album was intended as a tribute to Alice Coltrane's late husband, John Coltrane, who had died the year before. The liner notes feature the message: "This music is dedicated to the mystic, Ohnedaruth, known as John Coltrane during the period from September 23, 1926 to July 17, 1967." Although Alice Coltrane is credited for producing the album, Bob Thiele oversaw its release. Coltrane later called Thiele "a gentleman, and very professional," and reflected: "I think that, in the memory of John, he wanted to just present everything in the best way possible."

== Reception ==
Professional ratings
Review scores
Source	Rating
AllMusic	4/5 stars
DownBeat	1.5/5 stars
The Penguin Guide to Jazz Recordings	3/4 stars

Initial critical reaction to the album was indifferent. Jazz Journal's Barry McRae wrote: "If... this album was intended as a musical epitaph to the late John Coltrane, it does him less than justice," while a DownBeat reviewer called Coltrane "an artist in the process of becoming," and stated: "piano and harp are unsuitable instruments for transmitting [John Coltrane's] passionate utterance."

Recent reviews, however, have been more positive. An AllMusic writer said the album "stands tall in the artist's excellent discography," calling it "one of the landmark debuts in avant-garde jazz." The authors of The Penguin Guide to Jazz Recordings praised Sanders' contribution, calling him Coltrane's "most responsive and sympathetic playing companion, occasionally capable... of Trane-like transcendence."

Author Ashley Kahn described the album as "a peek at the signature style Alice had been developing while attending to a growing family," and commented: "Echoing the arpeggio-rich approach she eventually taught herself on the harp..., her piano playing had become filled with a loose, lyrical flow."

Author Tammy L. Kernodle noted the presence of "a swinging gospel sensibility" on some of the tracks, and commented: "One only needs to listen to 'Lord Help Me to Be' with the wail of Sanders' horn and the pulsating chords played by Alice under a swinging bass line to understand her musical manifestation of the tormented soul crying out to God from within the chaos of the world and to grasp the emotional, spiritual, and musical connections between her music and that of the Black religious experience."

In an article for the River Cities' Reader, Max Allison wrote: "Coltrane carves out her own path here right from the get-go with her stunning piano performances, which wind up and down the keys with restless energy and virtuosic post-bebop dexterity before settling into gorgeous melodies and more wistful atmospheres."

== Track listing ==
All compositions by Alice Coltrane.

=== Original LP ===
Side A
No.	Title	Length
1.	"Ohnedaruth"	7:49
2.	"Gospel Trane"	6:44
3.	"I Want to See You"	6:42
Total length:		21:15

Side B
No.	Title	Length
4.	"Lovely Sky Boat"	6:51
5.	"Oceanic Beloved"	4:18
6.	"Atmic Peace"	5:53
Total length:		17:02 38:17

=== CD Reissue ===
No.	Title	Length
1.	"Lord, Help Me to Be"	7:30
2.	"The Sun"	4:01
3.	"Ohnedaruth"	7:49
4.	"Gospel Trane"	6:44
5.	"I Want to See You"	6:42
6.	"Lovely Sky Boat"	6:51
7.	"Oceanic Beloved"	4:18
8.	"Atmic Peace"	5:53
9.	"Altruvista"	6:55
Total length:		56:43

- "Altruvista" is an edited version of a piano solo that was recorded on March 7, 1967, at the Van Gelder Studio in Englewood Cliffs, New Jersey during the session which yielded the John Coltrane album Expression.
- "Lord, Help Me to Be", "The Sun", and "Ohnedaruth" were recorded on January 29, 1968, at the John Coltrane Home in Dix Hills, New York. "Lord, Help Me to Be" and "The Sun" were initially released on the 1968 John Coltrane/Alice Coltrane album Cosmic Music. "The Sun" features a spoken introduction by John Coltrane and Pharoah Sanders during which they state "May there be peace and love and perfection throughout all creation, O God" three times. This may have been recorded on February 2, 1966.
- The remaining tracks were recorded on June 6, 1968, at the John Coltrane Home.
- It is unlikely that "Atmic Peace" was a typographical error for "Atomic Peace," as many later editions of the album have insisted. Coltrane was a devout believer in Hinduism and this song title is probably a reference to the core Hindu concept of Ātman, which is closely related to Brahman. The original 1968 LP release featured the word "Atmic" in several different places, including the back cover and the center label. In Cosmic Music, his book on Coltrane's life and work, Andy Beta notes that "Studying with [Swami] Satchidananda, Alice embraced Hinduism and the tenets of Advaita Vedanta (nonduality), in which the Self (the Atman) is a reflection of and identical to the Absolute (the Brahman)."

== Personnel ==
- Alice Coltrane – piano (CD tracks 1–5 & 9), harp (CD tracks 6–8)
- Pharoah Sanders – tenor saxophone (CD track 1), flute (CD track 2), bass clarinet (CD track 3)
- Jimmy Garrison – bass (CD tracks 1–8)
- Ben Riley – drums (CD tracks 1–3)
- Rashied Ali – drums (CD tracks 4–8)
