= Michelle Coltrane =

American jazz singer

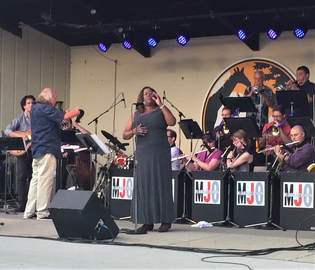
Michelle Coltrane with the Milwaukee Jazz Orchestra

Michelle Coltrane is an American jazz vocalist and composer.

== Family and early life ==
Coltrane was born in Paris, France. She was raised primarily in Long Island, New York by her mother, musician Alice Coltrane, and her step-father, saxophonist John Coltrane. Her father is jazz vocalist Kenny Hagood. Exposed to music at a very early age, she began pursuing her own career in her family's footsteps.

== Career ==
She has performed and collaborated with artists such as Scott Hiltzik, Shea Welsh, Kenny Kirkland, Jeff Watts, Ronnie Laws, Billy Childs, Jack DeJohnette, Marvin "Smitty" Smith, Reggie Workman, The Gap Band, the McCoy Tyner Trio, and her brother Ravi Coltrane, Her music festival appearances include the Montreaux Jazz Festival, the Panama Jazz Festival, the Miami Jazz Festival, and the John Coltrane International Jazz and Blues Festival. Beyond her solo work, she has performed internationally with the Sai Anantam Ashram Singers presenting the music of Alice Coltrane.

In 1994, Coltrane released her debut album, I Think of You, a collaboration with composer Scott Hiltzik. Her second album, Awakening, was released in 2017 and featured sung versions of her father's songs.

Outside of her performance career, Coltrane co-hosted the “Straight No Chaser” radio program on KPFK in Los Angeles and was a professional DJ in Tokyo in her 20s.

She now is chief creative officer of the John Coltrane Home, a non-profit organization.

== Discography ==
=== Albums ===
- I Think of You (1994)
- Awakening (2017)

=== Guest vocals ===
- The Gap Band - Straight from the Heart
- Shea Welsh - Arrival
