= World Galaxy =

Studio album by Alice Coltrane
- Released: May 1972
- Recorded: 15 and 16 November 1971
- Studio: The Record Plant, New York City
- Genre: Spiritual jazz
- Length: 40:55
- Label: Impulse! Records
- Producer: Alice Coltrane and Ed Michel

Alice Coltrane chronology
| Universal Consciousness (1971) | World Galaxy (1972) | Lord of Lords (1973) |

World Galaxy is the sixth solo album by Alice Coltrane. It was recorded in November 1971 in New York City, and was released in 1972 by Impulse! Records. On the album, Coltrane appears on piano, organ, harp, tamboura, and percussion, and is joined by saxophonist Frank Lowe, bassist Reggie Workman, drummer Ben Riley, timpanist Elayne Jones, and a string ensemble led by David Sackson. Violinist Leroy Jenkins also appears on soloist on one track, and Swami Satchidananda provides narration. World Galaxy features a trilogy of original compositions bookended by "My Favorite Things" and "A Love Supreme", two pieces for which her husband John Coltrane was known. It was the second in a series of three albums (following Universal Consciousness and preceding Lord of Lords) on which Coltrane appeared with an ensemble of strings.

In 2011, Impulse! reissued the album, along with Huntington Ashram Monastery, as part of a compilation titled Huntington Ashram Monastery/World Galaxy.

== Reception ==
Professional ratings
Review scores
| Source | Rating |
|---|---|
| AllMusic | 4.5/5 stars |
| The Attic | 4.5/5 stars |
| DownBeat | 2.5/5 stars |

The AllMusic review by Thom Jurek awarded the album 4½ stars stating "This set may take some getting used to for some, but it's easily one of the strongest records Alice Coltrane ever released, and one of the finest moments in jazz from the early '70s".

In an article for The Guardian, Jennifer Lucy Allan wrote: "there is a ferocious power and emotion in these versions of 'A Love Supreme' and 'My Favorite Things'... 'My Favorite Things' starts sweetly but descends into a chaotic breakdown as her organ flares in anxious bursts... 'A Love Supreme'... is soothingly narrated by Swami Satchidananda before she lets loose a rude funk upon the standard's signature motif."

Chris May of All About Jazz called the album a "full-on astral experience," and commented: "World Galaxy is transporting stuff—and the four pieces which precede "A Love Supreme" make that much maligned track sound perfectly logical." AAJ's Chris M. Slawecki described World Galaxy as a "meditative sound cloud," and stated that, on the three "Galaxy" pieces, "lush strings" surround "Coltrane's organ, tamboura and harp, which flutters within and around the sound like a winged angel." He referred to "A Love Supreme" as "a genuine musical experience—a religious musical experience centered around the sacredness of the word 'love' and the nature and name of God."

Writing for The Quietus, Stewart Smith stated that, on the "Galaxy" trilogy, "Coltrane elevates her music to the astral plane." He described "Galaxy Around Olodumare" as "free jazz via Stravinsky and Stockhausen, with Frank Lowe's raw saxophone burning a hole through gaseous string abstractions," while "Galaxy In Turiya" features "harp drifting over luscious strings," followed by "Galaxy In Satchidananda," which "sounds like the birth of a new planet."

In an article for The Attic, Dragos Rusu wrote: "The harp is probably one of the very few instruments that you can reach the most divine and spiritual sound with; and there's plenty of harp, in each song... The trilogy of the Galaxies... travels through time and religion, eventually hypnotizing the listener with its ridiculously rough melody, harmony and love. This album is pure love."

== Track listing ==
All compositions by Alice Coltrane except where noted.

Side A
| No. | Title | Writer(s) | Length |
|---|---|---|---|
| 1. | "My Favorite Things" | Richard Rodgers, Oscar Hammerstein II | 6:22 |
| 2. | "Galaxy Around Olodumare" | | 4:15 |
| 3. | "Galaxy In Turiya" | | 9:55 |

Side B
| No. | Title | Writer(s) | Length |
|---|---|---|---|
| 4. | "Galaxy In Satchidananda" | | 10:25 |
| 5. | "A Love Supreme" | John Coltrane | 9:58 |
| Total length: | | | 40:55 |

== Personnel ==
- Alice Coltrane – piano, organ, harp, tanpura, percussion
- Frank Lowe – tenor saxophone, percussion, soprano saxophone
- Reggie Workman – bass
- Ben Riley – drums, percussion
- Leroy Jenkins – solo violin
- Elayne Jones – timpani
- Swami Satchidananda – narration (tracks: B1, B2)

=== The String Orchestra ===
- Concertmaster – David Sackson
- Strings - Alan Shulman, Arthur Aaron, Avron Coleman, Edward Green, Harry Glickman, Henry Aaron, Irving Spice, Janet Hill, Joan Kalisch, Julien Barber, Leroy Jenkins, Ronald Lipscomb, Seymour Miroff, Thomas Nickerson, William Stone
