= Divine Songs (Swamini Turiyasangitananda album) =

Studio album by Swamini Turiyasangitananda
- Released: 1987
- Length: 58:44
- Labels: Avatar Book Institute; Matador Records (2026 reissue)
- Producer: Turiyasangitananda

Swamini Turiyasangitananda chronology
Turiya Sings (1982)	Divine Songs (1987)	Infinite Chants (1990)

Divine Songs is an album by Swamini Turiyasangitananda, formerly known as Alice Coltrane. It is an album composed of devotional songs from the Hindu religion. The songs are accompanied by Turiya's signature playing on the Wurlitzer organ. She plays the songs on the organ, beginning with the traditional Indian mode, but then improvises and stretches it until it turns back on itself musically. Her use of breaks, syncopation, and harmonic invention re-images the songs as something original and nearly unclassifiable.

== Reception ==
Professional ratings
Review scores
Source	Rating
The Virgin Encyclopedia of Jazz	3/5 stars

In an article for The Guardian, Jennifer Lucy Allan described Divine Songs as "a mind-blowing psychedelic vision of what transcendence might sound like," and wrote: "Its lavish string sections and sung chants combine with luminous synths whose pitch arches upwards as if in salutation. It's an unbeatable cosmic power-up. Coltrane is not often considered the creator of synthesiser masterpieces, but this album demands a reassessment in that respect."

David James of Optimistic Underground called the album "the purest expression of the spiritual drone jazz sound that Alice had been perfecting ever since establishing the Shanti Anantam Ashram in the decade prior," and commented, "The atmosphere cracks open with harp and strings, shining brightly around her transcendent voice. It might not be for the casual fan, but if you're tuned in to the celestial vibe Alice developed in the years after her husband, John Coltrane, died, you'll settle in perfectly here."

Writing for The Hum, Bradford Bailey stated that the album is "drenched in introspection and sorrow – her voice plumbing the depths of beauty and loss."

Composer Courtney Bryan remarked that, when listening to "Keshava Murahara", she "treasure[s] [Coltrane's] compositional genius — the grounding presence and modal harmonies of the organ, the evocative chanting of the bhajans, the soaring strings, and the otherworldly synthesizer that in the final minute illustrates what it may feel like to transcend this material existence to higher realms of spiritual consciousness."

== Track listing ==
Side A
No.	Title	Length
1.	"Rama Rama"	7:34
2.	"Keshava Murahara"	9:43
3.	"Er Ra"	4:50
4.	"Madhura Manohara Giridhari"	6:45
Total length:		28:52

Side B
No.	Title	Length
5.	"Deva Deva"	7:28
6.	"Chandra Shekara"	5:09
7.	"Om Shanti"	6:51
8.	"Rama Guru"	5:46
9.	"Hari Narayan"	4:38
Total length:		29:52 58:44

== Personnel ==
- Alice Coltrane – vocals, organ, synthesizer
- Students of the Vedantic Center: backing vocals, percussion
