= Lord of Lords (album) =

Studio album by Alice Coltrane
- Released: January 1973
- Recorded: July 5–13, 1972
- Studio: The Village Recorder, Los Angeles, California
- Genre: Spiritual jazz, 20th-century classical
- Length: 42:18
- Label: Impulse! AS-9224
- Producer: Ed Michel

Alice Coltrane chronology
World Galaxy (1972)	Lord of Lords (1973)	Illuminations (1974)

Lord of Lords is the seventh solo studio album by Alice Coltrane. It was recorded in California in July 1972, and was issued in 1973 by Impulse! Records, her final release for the label. On the album, Coltrane appears on piano, organ, harp, timpani, and percussion, and is joined by bassist Charlie Haden, drummer Ben Riley, and a string ensemble, which she conducts. Lord of Lords features three original compositions along with excerpts from Igor Stravinsky's The Firebird and an arrangement of the piece "Going Home", which was, in turn, adapted from the second movement of Dvorak's Symphony No. 9 in E minor. It was the third in a series of three albums (following Universal Consciousness and World Galaxy) on which Coltrane appeared with an ensemble of strings.

In the album liner notes, Coltrane stated that she received a "visitation" from Stravinsky, with whom she discussed music, and who presented her with "a small glass vial containing a clear, colorless liquid." She commented: "Since that time, it has been incumbent on me to proceed forthrightly into the great master Stravinsky's works."

According to producer Ed Michel, Coltrane worked with the string players, who were top-rank classically-trained studio musicians, and "opened [them] up... so they could do absolutely astonishing things." He stated that, afterwards, "the string players couldn't believe that they had done what they had done."

In 2011, Impulse! reissued the album, along with Universal Consciousness, as part of a compilation titled Universal Consciousness/Lord of Lords.

== Reception ==
Professional ratings
Review scores
Source	Rating
AllMusic	3.5/5 stars
Pitchfork	8.0/10
The Vinyl District	A

In a review for AllMusic, Thom Jurek wrote: "it was obvious from the beginning that [Coltrane] was seeking to incorporate Indian classical music's drone center into her work, and was literally obsessed with the timbral, chromatic, and harmonic possibilities of strings. She succeeds here, in ending her Impulse! period with elegance, grace, and soul."

Pitchfork's Matthew Kassel stated that Lord of Lords "may be the most ecstatic record she made," calling it "unnerving, slow-building, a throbbing organism of sound." He noted that, despite the fact that Coltrane was "on her way to becoming a full-blown swamini," she "never entirely abandoned her roots.... on Lord of Lords you can hear the vestiges of bebop in her fleet-fingered organ improvisations."

Matthew Fiander of PopMatters commented: "The sheer breadth of this sound is staggering, and the way it places the formal orchestral parts alongside Coltrane’s experimentalism sounds remarkably fluid... Unruly as it may be, there's a lightness here, an acceptance of joy, an ease within the wandering."

The Vinyl District's Joseph Neff called the album "a record of striking dimension," and stated that it is distinguished by "Coltrane's comfort and level of investment in exploring arranged strings as a vessel for spiritual transcendence."

In an article for All About Jazz, Chris May described the album as "gigantic in conception... Not so much astral, as galactic jazz."

== Track listing ==
Side A
No.	Title	Writer(s)	Length
1.	"Andromeda's Suffering"	Alice Coltrane	9:04
2.	"Sri Rama Ohnedaruth"	Alice Coltrane	6:12
3.	"Excerpts from The Firebird"	Igor Stravinsky, arranged by Alice Coltrane	5:43

Side B
No.	Title	Writer(s)	Length
4.	"Lord of Lords"	Alice Coltrane	11:17
5.	"Going Home"	Traditional, arranged by Alice Coltrane	10:02
Total length:			42:18

== Personnel ==
- Alice Coltrane – organ, piano, harp, timpani, percussion
- Charlie Haden – bass
- Ben Riley – drums

=== String ensemble ===
- Violins - Bernard Kundell, Gerald Vinci, Gordon Marron, James Getzoff, Janice Gower, Leonard Malarsky, Lou Klass, Murray Adler, Nathan Kaproff, Ronald Folsom, Sidney Sharp, William Henderson
- Violas - David Schwartz, Leonard Selic, Marilyn Baker, Myra Kestenbaum, Rollice Dale, Samuel Boghosian
- Cellos - Anne Goodman, Edgar Lustgarten, Jan Kelly, Jerry Kessler, Jesse Ehrlich, Raphael Kramer, Ray Kelley
