= Translinear Light =

Studio album by Alice Coltrane
- Released: September 28, 2004
- Recorded: April 28, 2000 to June 12, 2004
- Genre: Jazz
- Length: 73:40
- Label: Impulse! Records
- Producer: Ravi Coltrane

Alice Coltrane chronology
Glorious Chants (1995)	Translinear Light (2004)	Carnegie Hall '71 (2018)

Translinear Light is the final studio album by American jazz pianist Alice Coltrane, released in September, 2004 on Impulse Records. It was produced by her son Ravi Coltrane, who also played saxophone for the album as did her third son Oran. In addition to original compositions, it includes two by her husband John Coltrane and four interpretations of traditional songs.

== Background ==
Translinear Light was Coltrane's first commercial album following a 26-year hiatus, during which she was "home most often, focused on contemplation and inner growth." She recorded Translinear Light at the encouragement of her sons Ravi and Oran. Ravi Coltrane stated: "I always felt like there was a gap that was widening — any idea of us being two professional working musicians at the same time was just evaporating. I was getting deeper and deeper into music and each year she would say she was more and more retired from music. I think about those times I had opportunities to play professionally with my mother, but I was new to it and not ready. I wanted some document that I'll always be able to share with my kids. I don't want to have a day of regret, saying, 'I never did this with my mom.'" Alice Coltrane recalled: "Well, I told my children I'm so happy to do this, but I’m not starting a second career!" "My son was... practically pleading, 'Mom, you must do this, you have to!' It sort of originated from him, 'Mom, please make a record, make a CD.' So I said okay and this is what we did." Recordings for the album took place at five different locations on dates ranging from April 28, 2000 to June 12, 2004.

Coltrane scholar Ashley Kahn wrote: "The title is a play on the Coltrane name, and also a nod to Alice Coltrane's deep spirituality." With regard to the title, he quotes Coltrane: "Look at what trance means... It means to transcend... it means to become transcendental! So if we get a singular transcendental path of light, that could lead to such great dimensions of consciousness, of revelation, of spirituality, of spiritual power."

== Reception ==
Professional ratings
Review scores
Source	Rating
AllMusic	4.5/5 stars
The Penguin Guide to Jazz Recordings	4/4 stars

Ekow Eshun, writing for The Observer (UK) in 2004 said, 'Translinear Light is less of a comeback than a continuation of where she left off. Coltrane eschews the harp, her most well-known instrument, for piano and Wurlitzer organ. And while the album doesn't touch the heights of a record like 1970's Journey in Satchidananda, it's more focused than her later work in the Seventies'. JazzTimes reviewer David R. Adler described the album as "momentous," stating that it "channels the raw magic of Alice Coltrane’s classic early albums without recapitulating old ideas. There is a relevance and sonic freshness in her Wurlitzer organ, her synthesizer, her piano... Translinear Light is seamless, and wholly refreshing."

John Kelman, writing in All About Jazz, called the disc "a richly rewarding album of music that has little to do with music as an exercise in technique and more as a means of conveying deeper expression... With Translinear Light Coltrane has created a work that honestly and unassumingly demonstrates the healing power of music, bypassing more intellectual concerns and instead going straight for the heart of the matter." AllMusic reviewer Thom Jurek wrote: "Translinear Light is a major entry in Coltrane's catalog. It is a defining, aesthetically brilliant statement from a master composer, improviser, and player. If ever there were a candidate for jazz album of 2004, Translinear Light is it."

The authors of the Penguin Guide to Jazz Recordings stated that the album "outstrips all expectations", and wrote: "Her supporting cast could hardly be better, of course. DeJohnette is masterful, Haden strong and supportive, and her two sons play better than at any point in their admittedly very different careers... There's nothing flimsy or otherworldly about this music, even when it evokes metaphysical issues. It is intense, lyrical, often unexpectedly raw, and focused on the here and now."

== Track listing ==
No.	Title	Writer(s)	Length
1.	"Sita Ram"	traditional	6:08
2.	"Walk with Me"	traditional	7:50
3.	"Translinear Light"	Alice Coltrane	9:50
4.	"Jagadishwar"	Alice Coltrane	5:47
5.	"This Train"	traditional	6:06
6.	"The Hymn"	Alice Coltrane	3:04
7.	"Blue Nile"	Alice Coltrane	8:05
8.	"Crescent"	John Coltrane	6:22
9.	"Leo"	John Coltrane	9:40
10.	"Triloka"	Alice Coltrane	5:08
11.	"Satya Sai Isha"	traditional	5:40
Total length:			73:40

== Personnel ==
- Alice Coltrane – piano or Wurlitzer organ; synthesizer on "The Hymn"
- Ravi Coltrane – tenor saxophone on "Jagadishwar," "Blue Nile," "Crescent," and "Leo"; soprano saxophone on "Translinear Light"; percussion on "Sita Ram" and "Translinear Light"; sleigh bells on "Leo"
- Oran Coltrane – alto saxophone on "The Hymn"
- Charlie Haden – bass on "Translinear Light," "This Train," "Crescent," and "Triloka"
- James Genus – bass on "Walk with Me," "Jagadishwar," and "Blue Nile"
- Jack De Johnette – drums on "Sita Ram," "Translinear Light," "This Train," and "Crescent," and "Leo"
- Jeff "Tain" Watts – drums on "Walk with Me," "Jagadishwar," and "Blue Nile"
- The Sai Anantam Ashram Singers – vocals on "Satya Sai Isha"
