= Ray Appleton =

American jazz drummer (1941–2015)

- Also known as: "Killer" Ray Appleton
- Born: Otis Ray Appleton; August 23, 1941; Indianapolis, Indiana, U.S.
- Died: October 7, 2015 (aged 74)
- Genres: Jazz
- Instruments: Drums

Otis Ray Appleton (August 23, 1941 – October 7, 2015) was an American jazz drummer.

== Early life ==
Born in Indianapolis, Indiana, his interest in drums began when visiting the local fire department to hear their "Drum and Bugle Corps" practice. He played in school bands, but hearing Freddie Hubbard and James Spaulding led to a serious interest in jazz.

== Career ==
Appleton toured and recorded with John Coltrane, Freddie Hubbard, Wes Montgomery and others. Due to a car accident and diabetes, he lost part of his left leg in 1997. He reportedly received his nickname "killer" from bassist Larry Ridley and became a person of note in Indianapolis's jazz community.

== Personal life ==
Appleton died of congestive heart failure on October 7, 2015, at age 74.

== Discography ==
=== As leader ===
- Killer Ray Rides Again (Sharp Nine, 1996)

=== As sideman ===
With David Hazeltine

- 4 Flights Up (Sharp Nine, 1995)

With Freddie Hubbard

- Backlash (1967)

With Jimmy Witherspoon

- The Blues Is Now (1967)
