= Live in Japan (John Coltrane album) =

Live album by John Coltrane
- Released: 1973 (original triple LP); 1991 4-CD set
- Recorded: July 11, 1966 at Shinjuku Kosei Nenkin Hall and July 22, 1966 at Sankei Hall
- Genre: Free jazz, avant-garde jazz
- Length: 247:01
- Label: Impulse!
- Producer: Alice Coltrane, Ed Michel

John Coltrane chronology
Infinity (1972)	Live in Japan (1973)	Interstellar Space (1974)

Concert in Japan Cover

Professional ratings
Review scores
Source	Rating
Allmusic	3/5 stars
The Rolling Stone Jazz Record Guide	Concert in Japan

Live in Japan is a live album by American saxophonist John Coltrane, recorded for radio broadcast during his only Japanese tour in July 1966 at two Tokyo venues, Shinjuku Kosei Nenkin Hall and Sankei Hall. The recordings feature his last group, a quintet featuring Coltrane, his wife/pianist Alice, saxophonist/bass clarinetist Pharoah Sanders, bassist Jimmy Garrison and drummer Rashied Ali.

The recordings were originally released in 1973 as a heavily abridged double LP by Impulse! Records, titled Concert In Japan. The Japanese release from the same year was titled Coltrane In Japan and featured an expanded five-sided 3-LP set; a second 3-LP volume titled Second Night In Tokyo was issued in Japan in 1977 with an audio interview amended to side six. Versions have also been released by MCA Records under the titles Coltrane In Tokyo Vol. 1 and Coltrane In Tokyo Vol. 2. The first compact disc versions issued by Impulse! were titled Live In Japan Vol. 1 and Live In Japan Vol. 2 and used the tracklists of the 1970s Japanese releases. Finally, Impulse! released a 4-CD box set of both volumes in 1991.

These recordings are of some of the longest and densest free improvisation of Coltrane's later career, with some performances of single tunes approaching an hour in length. By this point in his career, Coltrane was firmly enmeshed into the avant-garde style of jazz. Sanders, who was an innovator of free jazz, influenced Coltrane's playing through his technical use of overblowing and fierce vibrations of the reed. Both saxophone players use multiphonics, overtones, and other extended musical techniques.

== Brief background ==
At the time Coltrane and his quintet were invited to tour Japan in July 1966, he was, according to the Japanese jazz magazine Swing Journal, the most popular musician in Japan, with albums selling as many as 30,000 copies each. The members of the group arrived by plane in Tokyo on July 8 and were treated like visiting dignitaries, with several thousand fans greeting the plane. The group's schedule was grueling, and involved playing seventeen concerts over fourteen days. During the tour, a number of Japanese jazz musicians sat in with the group, and Coltrane and Sanders were presented with alto saxophones by the Yamaha Instrument Company, with the understanding that the musicians would play the instruments and offer advice. (This explains the use of alto saxophones on some of the recordings.) Coltrane also participated in at least one press conference, and took time to visit the War Memorial Park in Nagasaki. Despite the exhausting itinerary, Coltrane biographer Eric Nisenson called Coltrane's Japan tour "the event that was probably the greatest single triumph of his life".

While in Japan, Coltrane began experiencing headaches that foreshadowed the health problems that would lead to his death in 1967. After Coltrane's death, Rashied Ali noticed that a number of the photographs that he had taken during the Japan tour showed Coltrane holding his hand over his liver, "like he was trying to stop that pain he must have been feeling all by himself."

== Reception ==
Ben Ratliff described the recording as "a record of long-form stamina, closer than any other recording to what [Coltrane's] performances had actually been like for about five years..." He continued: "It has its chaos, but in no way has Coltrane renounced grace: in 'Peace on Earth,' a new rubato ballad in the 'Naima' style, he displays a technique that had never been more stunning, with rapid interrogations of harmony and extreme dynamics—from mild susurrations to a stretch before the end of his solo where he packs so much force into the horn that it sounds as if it might burst. Then, when he returns after Alice's solo, it's as if he's looking backward at his career; he seems to reference at various points the melodic cells of 'A Love Supreme' and 'Ascension', the melody of 'Naima,' and the melody of 'Body and Soul.' But these are not in any way explicit references. He is working within his own improvisational language, a big pool, wide enough to accommodate all that music."

Coltrane biographer J. C. Thomas referred to "Peace on Earth" as a "simple, exquisite cadenza with... countless, spiraling variations," and wrote: "The sound and feeling John Coltrane creates on 'Peace' is an extraordinary testament to the Japanese, whose attention, love, and respect he must have both welcomed and absorbed, for it is his most inspired 'live' performance on record. He is 'talking to you,' speaking so directly and passionately that the music sounds like a gentle whispering in your ear; he is asking you to love all people and is hoping they will love you in return."

In a review for AllMusic, Scott Yanow commented: "listeners who enjoy avant-garde jazz will find many stirring moments among the very lengthy performances." Thom Jurek, in a review of the earlier release Concert in Japan, stated: "No Coltrane fan... should be without this fine recording," and wrote that "Alice Coltrane's piano... is utterly lovely" while "drummer Rashied Ali and bassist Jimmy Garrison show an almost symbiotic interplay," the three of them "manag[ing] to just barely tether this group to the earth."

Gary Giddins awarded the album an "A−", and wrote: "The six selections... range from 25 to 57 minutes long, and there are moments when the heat they generate could melt glass. The big surprise for Coltrane hands is that he plays alto sax (instead of his usual tenor or soprano) on his signature theme, 'My Favorite Things.' Better fasten your seat belts for this one."

Writing for Perfect Sound Forever, John Howard stated: "Enormous and lush, like huge tracts of uncharted land, this is music that sounds different almost every time you hear it. Alice's piano paintings were never more colorful, and Coltrane and Sanders duel out into the stratosphere. Warning: These songs are LOOONG, some are nearly as long as an hour. Not a place for beginners. That said, it is beautiful music, abstract and beatific. Wonderfully recorded as well. The songs are so long that as a listener you interact with the music to structure it in a way that you can understand. High praise, in my book."

== Track listing ==
All compositions by John Coltrane except as indicated

=== Disc One ===
1. "Afro Blue" (Mongo Santamaría) – 38:49 Previously released on Second Night In Tokyo
2. "Peace on Earth" – 26:25 Previously released on Second Night In Tokyo

=== Disc Two ===
1. "Crescent" – 54:33 Previously released on Second Night In Tokyo

=== Disc Three ===
1. "Peace on Earth" – 25:05 Previously released on Concert in Japan and Coltrane In Japan
2. "Leo" – 44:49 Previously released on Concert in Japan and Coltrane In Japan

=== Disc Four ===
1. "My Favorite Things" (Richard Rodgers / Oscar Hammerstein II) – 57:19 Previously released on Coltrane In Japan

== Notes ==
- Disc 1 & 2 recorded at Sankei Hall, Tokyo, on July 11, 1966
- Disc 3 & 4 recorded at Shinjuku Kosei Nenkin Hall, Tokyo, on July 22, 1966,

Note: According to the Japan tour itinerary, which was reproduced in its entirety in both J. C. Thomas' biography Chasin' the Trane and The John Coltrane Reference (the authors of the Reference note that the itinerary was provided to them by Rashied Ali, and a photocopy of the first page of the itinerary is also included), the Coltrane quintet played in Sankei Hall on July 10 and 11, and Shinjuku Kosei Nenkin Hall on July 18, 19, and 22, 1966. However, the CD notes incorrectly state that the July 11 recording was made at Shinjuku Kosei Nenkin Hall and the July 22 recording at Sankei Hall. The Coltrane Reference confirms this error, stating that, for the July 11 concert, the CD "wrongly lists the location as Shinjuku Koseinenkin Hall" and, for the July 22 concert, it "wrongly lists location as Sankei Hall". Katherine Whatley's article "Tracing a Giant Step: John Coltrane in Japan" provides an overview of the entire tour, including dates and locations.

== Personnel ==
- John Coltrane - soprano, alto and tenor saxophones, percussion
- Alice Coltrane - piano
- Pharoah Sanders - alto and tenor saxophones, bass clarinet, percussion
- Jimmy Garrison - bass
- Rashied Ali - drums

=== Production ===
- Alice Coltrane - producer
- Ed Michel - producer, transfer
- Bob Brown - transfer with
- Kathryn King - transfer with
- Rick Heenan - transfer with
- Honeya Barth - illustration
