= Ptah, the El Daoud =

1970 studio album by Alice Coltrane

Studio album by Alice Coltrane
- Released: September 1970
- Recorded: January 26, 1970
- Studio: Alice Coltrane's home studio (Dix Hills, New York)
- Genres: Post-bop; spiritual jazz; avant-garde jazz
- Length: 45:56
- Label: Impulse! Records
- Producer: Ed Michel

Alice Coltrane chronology
Huntington Ashram Monastery (1969)	Ptah, the El Daoud (1970)	Journey in Satchidananda (1971)

Ptah, the El Daoud is the third solo album by the American jazz pianist and harpist Alice Coltrane, released on Impulse! Records in September 1970. The album was recorded in the basement of her home in Dix Hills, New York, in a session on January 26, 1970.

While Pharoah Sanders had played bass clarinet on one track on 1968's A Monastic Trio, this was Coltrane's first album to feature wind players more extensively, with Sanders and Joe Henderson playing tenor saxophone on two tracks and alto flute on "Blue Nile" (on which Coltrane also switches from piano to harp). Sanders is recorded on the right channel and Henderson on the left channel throughout. Coltrane noted that "Joe Henderson is more on the intellectual side, while Pharoah is more abstract, more transcendental."

All of the compositions were written by Coltrane. The title track is named the Egyptian god Ptah, "El Daoud" meaning "the beloved" in Arabic. Turiya was defined by Coltrane as "a state of consciousness — the high state of Nirvana, the goal of human life", while Ramakrishna was a 19th-century Bengali Hindu mystic; the name also denotes a movement founded by his disciples.

Jim Evans designed the album's artwork.

== Reception ==
Professional ratings
Review scores
Source	Rating
AllMusic	4.5/5 stars
DownBeat	3/5 stars
The Penguin Guide to Jazz Recordings	3/4 stars
The Rolling Stone Jazz & Blues Album Guide	3.5/5 stars

In a review for AllMusic, Stacia Proefrock called Ptah, the El Daoud "a truly great album", writing: "listeners who surrender themselves to it emerge on the other side of its 46 minutes transformed. From the purifying catharsis of the first moments of the title track to the last moments of 'Mantra,' with its disjointed piano dance and passionate ribbons of tenor cast out into the universe, the album resonates with beauty, clarity, and emotion... Overlooked and buried for years in obscurity, this album deserves to be embraced for the gem it is." Mark Richardson of Pitchfork commented: "Coltrane is tremendously versatile on this record, at some points hunkering down in gauzy mysticism while elsewhere concentrating on logical, disciplined soloing. Echoes of her grounding in post-bop jazz are still present, though less so than on her 1968 debut A Monastic Trio." He described the track "Turiya and Ramakrishna" as featuring "some of [Coltrane's] greatest piano playing on record".

Matt Micucci of JazzIz included the album in his list "Five Essential Albums of 1970", calling it "the culmination of [Coltrane's] 'first period,' marked by music reminiscent of her collaborations with her late husband John and her explorations of the concert harp as an improvising vehicle." In a retrospective review for the album's fiftieth anniversary, Morgan Enos called it "otherworldly yet drenched in the blues", and stated that it "contains abundant hypnotic power and emotional import". His article also contained tributes from a number of musicians, including ESP-Disk manager and producer Steve Holtje, who noted: "I have a certain fondness of placing this album in the lineage of DIY recording... It's a Black female artist taking control of her music"; and Melvin Gibbs, who commented: "It's homey. It has that Sunday-afternoon-after-church vibe... it feels like your relatives were playing for you. That's evocative for me". Regarding the fact that the album was recorded during a period of grief following the death of John Coltrane, pianist Cat Toren noted: "She had four young kids, and she had lost the love of her life. I think that's huge. It speaks to her power as a woman, to go forth no matter the adversity of what else is going on in her life. I would be interested to know her support network and how she was able to produce this incredible work under such challenging conditions."

The authors of the Penguin Guide to Jazz gave the album three out of four stars, writing: "Ptah is the highest avatar of God in Egyptian religion, and the title-piece is a rippling essay in transcendence, the paired horns coming from quite different directions... Their doubling on alto flute on 'Blue Nile' is magnificent, a perfect complement to piano and harp."

== Track listing ==
All music is composed by Alice Coltrane.

Side A
No.	Title	Length
1.	"Ptah, the El Daoud"	13:59
2.	"Turiya and Ramakrishna"	8:19

Side B
No.	Title	Length
3.	"Blue Nile"	7:02
4.	"Mantra"	16:36
Total length:		45:56

== Personnel ==
- Alice Coltrane – piano (1, 2, 4), harp (3)
- Pharoah Sanders – tenor saxophone (1, 4), alto flute (3), bells
- Joe Henderson – tenor saxophone (1, 4), alto flute (3)
- Ron Carter – double bass
- Ben Riley – drums
