= The Creator Has a Master Plan =

Live album by Pharoah Sanders
- Released: 2003
- Recorded: April 23, 2003
- Venue: Wonder Station, Tokyo
- Genre: Jazz
- Length: 1:05:34
- Label: Venus; TKCV-35321
- Producer: Tetsuo Hara

Pharoah Sanders chronology
Spirits (2000)	The Creator Has a Master Plan (2003)	With a Heartbeat (2003)

The Creator Has a Master Plan is a live album by saxophonist Pharoah Sanders. It was recorded on April 23, 2003, at Wonder Station in Tokyo, Japan, and was released later that year by Venus Records. On the album, Sanders is joined by pianist William Henderson, bassist Ira Coleman, and drummer Joe Farnsworth. The title track first appeared on the 1969 album Karma.

== Reception ==
Professional ratings
Review scores
Source	Rating
AllMusic	3/5 stars
The Penguin Guide to Jazz	3/4 stars

In a review for AllMusic, Judith Schlesinger called the album "a rare treat," and wrote: "If he's not quite as pyrotechnic as before, his sound and soul are undiminished, and he's still coming up with unusual timbres."

The authors of The Penguin Guide to Jazz Recordings stated: "the title-piece is very well played, a lot fresher and more contemporary than the original sounds now. The new group also sharpens up the action considerably and there's a bite as well as romantic consideration to Pharoah's playing as a result."

== Track listing ==
1. "I Want to Talk About You" (Billy Eckstine) – 7:13
2. "Moon Rays" (Horace Silver) – 7:19
3. "Tokyo Blues" (Pharoah Sanders) – 13:07
4. "The Greatest Love of All" (Michael Masser) – 6:26
5. "The Creator Has a Master Plan" (Pharoah Sanders) – 8:59
6. "Welcome" (John Coltrane) – 11:14
7. "Tina" (Pharoah Sanders) – 6:17
8. "It's Easy to Remember" (Richard Rodgers, Lorenz Hart) – 4:59

== Personnel ==
- Pharoah Sanders – tenor saxophone
- William Henderson – piano
- Ira Coleman – bass
- Joe Farnsworth – drums
