= Pharoah's First =

Studio album by Pharoah Sanders
- Released: 1965
- Recorded: September 10, 1964
- Studio: Loft of audio engineer Jerry Newman, New York, NY
- Genre: Free jazz
- Length: 49:56
- Label: ESP-Disk

Pharoah Sanders chronology
Pharoah's First (1965)	Tauhid (1967)

Pharoah's First is the debut album by American free jazz saxophonist Pharoah Sanders, recorded in New York City at the loft of audio engineer Jerry Newman on September 10, 1964, and first released in 1965 on the ESP-Disk label. The album was originally issued with the title Pharaoh and was later re-released with the titles Pharoah Sanders Quintet and Pharaoh's First, and was also included in its entirety in the 2012 4-CD compilation In The Beginning 1963-1964.

== Background ==
Sanders moved from Oakland, California to New York City in the early 1960s. Upon his arrival, he struggled to make a living and resorted to pawning his horn, working odd jobs, and sleeping on the subway. He recalled: "I didn’t have nowhere to stay. Everybody was talking about, 'You should go to New York.' They said, 'That's the place to go!' So that's the reason I went to New York. I hitchhiked a ride to New York... I didn't know what was going on. I was trying to survive some kind of way. I used to work a few jobs here and there, earn five dollars, buy some food, buy some pizza. I had no money at all. I used to give blood and make fifteen dollars or ten dollars or whatever. I had to keep eating something."

Despite his circumstances, Sanders started playing with local musicians and establishing a name for himself. In January 1963, he recorded with a group led by Don Cherry (the tracks were released in 2012 on In The Beginning 1963-1964) and later that year Sanders reconnected with John Coltrane, whom he had met previously while Coltrane was in California with Miles Davis's group. He also formed his own group which included John Hicks, Wilbur Ware, and Billy Higgins. In May 1964, Sanders recorded with Paul Bley (these tracks were also released on In The Beginning 1963-1964) and also joined Sun Ra's group, substituting for John Gilmore, who had taken a leave of absence to play with Art Blakey. (Recordings of Sanders with Sun Ra were released in 1976 on Sun Ra Featuring Pharoah Sanders & Black Harold as well as on In The Beginning 1963-1964.) These early recordings provide glimpses of the direction Sanders would pursue once he joined Coltrane's group, and demonstrate his unique, forceful approach to the instrument. Leroi Jones wrote: "His command of harmonics (three, four, ten notes at once), his lyric timbre even when he is screaming, his control of the horn with his breathing... whatever the "note value," enable him to play a long heroic line of moving richness."

In September of that year, Sanders entered a studio as a band leader for the first time, and recorded two extended tracks at the loft of audio engineer Jerry Newman using a group featuring bebop-oriented musicians, including trumpeter Stan Foster, pianist Jane Getz, bassist William Bennett, and drummer Marvin Pattillo. The tracks were released by ESP-Disk in 1965 as the third item in their catalog (number 1003) under the title Pharaoh. Bernard Stollman, founder of ESP-Disk, recalled having met Sanders at the recording session: "He was extremely shy. Unless you knew him well, he was not garrulous... Pharoah didn't greet me; he just approached the engineer regarding the placement of the microphones. When it was over, I paid the group."

== Reception ==
Professional ratings
Review scores
Source	Rating
AllMusic	3/5 stars
Down Beat	3.5/5 stars
The Penguin Guide to Jazz Recordings	3/4 stars
Uncut	7/10

Reviews of the recording have been mixed, with a number of writers expressing puzzlement over the juxtaposition of Sanders, who "wastes no time blowing his horn apart", playing "some trademark wail and spasmodic multiphonic roar," with the competent but relatively conservative side musicians selected for the session. Al Campbell, writing for AllMusic, stated that Sanders' sidemen "play bebop, Sanders doesn't. You can hear that Sanders is ready to go out, but restrains himself due to this mismatching of musicians... It sounds as if this date was set up for someone like Dexter Gordon, who didn't show up, so they got Sanders at the last minute. Sanders really has no purpose on this conventional date besides initial name exposure as a leader. What a shame." All About Jazz reviewer Trevor MacLaren wrote: "This record has always been a thorn in the discography of saxophonist Pharoah Sanders. The playing is solid, but his legendary ripping chops are extremely subdued, making this disc seem out of place. Not to mention the fact that the musicians that Sanders is playing with are bebop players, slapping out bop riffs. At no other time did Sanders ever seek out that sound. Nowhere during his Coltrane apprenticeship did he even hint at bop." JazzTimes reviewer Scott Verrastro stated: "This album truly protrudes in the tenor's early catalogue... The overall demeanor of the two sidelong cuts... is purely hard bop, energetic but largely nondescript... There's an undeniably palpable sensation that this session was a result of an open date on the studio calendar and Sanders just happened to be the most recognizable name, thusly earning the 'leader' title. Overall, it's not a particularly memorable debut but nevertheless an intriguing document."

Other writers were more positive. AllAboutJazz reviewer Clifford Allen wrote that the disc "though somewhat of an aesthetic anomaly in the ESP catalog and, at the time, given more 'could-have-been' status than it probably deserved, is a crucial workshop puzzle-piece that gives historians of improvised music one very important look at Pharoah Sanders and his young, big ideas." A Forced Exposure review stated: "With one foot in mainstream jazz... and the other, tentatively at times, in the avant-garde, this is a fascinating glimpse of Sanders's style before he wielded the unremitting fierceness of his playing with Coltrane and the modal mysticism of his later solo albums on Impulse."

Regardless of its reception, the album is historically important in that it "caught the ear of John Coltrane" (one writer stated that "the steaming intensity of Pharoah drew Coltrane to Sanders".) Sanders became a member of Coltrane's group in September 1965.

== Track listing ==
1. "Seven by Seven" (Sanders) - 26:25
2. "Bethera" (Sanders) - 23:44

== Personnel ==
- Pharoah Sanders - tenor saxophone
- Stan Foster - trumpet
- Jane Getz - piano
- William Bennett - bass
- Marvin Pattillo - drums
