= A Prayer Before Dawn =

A Prayer Before Dawn may refer to:

- A Prayer Before Dawn (album)
- A Prayer Before Dawn (film)
