= Live in Paris (1975) (Lost ORTF Recordings) =

Live album by Pharoah Sanders
- Released: 2020
- Recorded: November 17, 1975
- Studio: Studio 104, Grand Auditorium, Maison de la Radio, Paris, France
- Genre: jazz
- Label: Transversales Disques TRS15
- Producer: Jonathan Fitoussi, Sébastien Rosat

Pharoah Sanders chronology
In the Beginning 1963–1964 (2012)	Live in Paris (1975) (Lost ORTF Recordings) (2020)

Live in Paris (1975) (Lost ORTF Recordings) is an LP album by American free jazz saxophonist Pharoah Sanders recorded live at the Grand Auditorium, Studio 104 of Maison de la Radio, Paris, France on November 17, 1975 and released in 2020 on the Transversales Disques label. It features recordings of Sanders performing with a quartet featuring pianist Danny Mixon, bassist Calvin Hill, and drummer Greg Bandy. The album fills in a chronological gap between Sanders' final Impulse! albums (Love in Us All and Elevation, recorded in 1973) and Pharoah, recorded in 1976 for India Navigation.

== Reception ==
Professional ratings
Review scores
Source	Rating
All About Jazz	3.5/5 stars
Pitchfork	9.0/10

In a review for Pitchfork, Mark Richardson assigned the album a rating of 9 out of 10, and awarded it "Best New Reissue". He wrote: "Sanders' group rolled up all the best qualities from his early-1970s LPs into a set that bursts with joy and discovery, positive vibrations radiating in every direction" and notes that "the overriding mood here is one of comfort and bliss." He concluded: "Love is everywhere. Could it be? Whatever contrary evidence exists elsewhere in the world, now or any other time in history, Sanders makes a convincing case for its omnipresence on this particular day 45 years ago."

Chris May, writing for All About Jazz, awarded the album 3.5 out of 5 stars, noting that Sander's 1975 quartet was "shortlived and otherwise unrecorded". He declared: "Hardcore Sanders connoisseurs will find Live In Paris (1975) a worthwhile addition to their collections."

In an article for Soundohm, Bradford Bailey commented: "Threaded with deep grooves, ranging from spiritual, laid back depths to hard blown fire, all realised by rock solid, in the pocket playing that rests within the heights of mastery, it's impossible not to get lost in the immersive world of these sounds. This is live jazz at its heights during the mid '70s as it's rarely able to be heard... Soulful and vast in range, Live in Paris (1975) brings Pharoah Sanders at his height to life... This one is so good you won't believe that it is the first time it is released. As essential as they come and easily one of the most important releases in jazz this year!"

Writing for HHV Mag, Kristoffer Cornils wrote: "That there is very little new material? So what. The opportunity for a rediscovery of his back catalogue seems all the more favourable: jazz has returned to the mainstream and the crates of special interest stores are lined up with compilations of the kind that the tenor saxophonist has given the term 'spiritual'. Everybody wants a piece of the pie and Sanders hopefully gets the biggest piece of the pie in his old age... Live In Paris 1975 offers several facets of Sanders' work – the gospel echoes as well as feverish bebop and free jazz borrowings. At the same time, it proves how Sanders, together with Mixon, Calvin Hill on double bass and drummer Greg Bandy, was able to get the very best out of old and new material even in a difficult phase of his career."

== Track listing ==
1. "Love Is Here : Part 1" (Sanders) – 6:11
2. "Love Is Here : Part 2" (Sanders) – 7:35
3. "Farrell Tune" (Sanders) – 7:43
4. "The Creator Has a Masterplan" (Sanders) – 8:53
5. "I Want to Talk About You" (Billy Eckstine) – 4:51
6. "Love Is Everywhere" (Sanders) – 8:25

== Personnel ==
- Pharoah Sanders – tenor saxophone, vocals
- Danny Mixon – piano and organ
- Calvin Hill – bass
- Greg Bandy – drums
