= Nancy (with the Laughing Face) =

Song recorded by Frank Sinatra

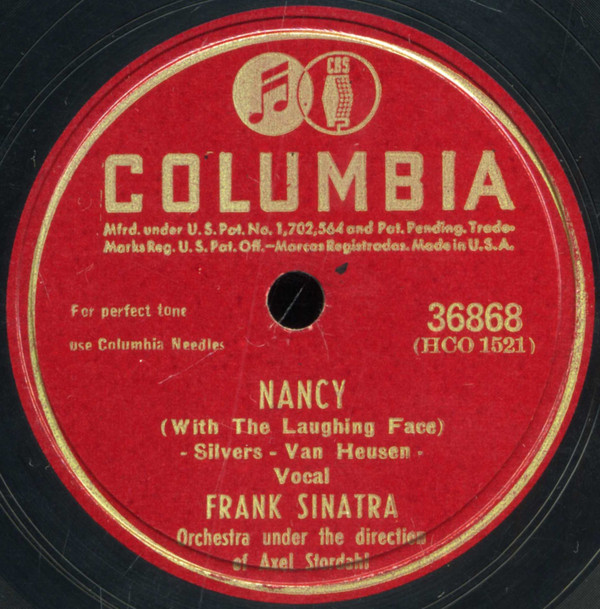

Song by Frank Sinatra
- Written: 1942
- Released: 1944
- Length: 3:39
- Label: Columbia
- Composer: Jimmy Van Heusen
- Lyricist: Phil Silvers

"Nancy (with the Laughing Face)" is a song composed in 1942 by Jimmy Van Heusen, with lyrics by Phil Silvers, called, originally, "Bessie (With The Laughing Face)". It was originally recorded by Frank Sinatra in 1944. Many, perhaps most, people—including, for a time, Sinatra himself—wrongly assume or assumed the song was composed specifically for Sinatra's wife or daughter, each named Nancy; the adjustment in name indeed was inspired by Sinatra's daughter.

== Origin ==
Former broadcast executive and music historian Rick Busciglio tells the story of the song's inception as related to him by Van Heusen:

In 1979, I was working with songwriter Jimmy Van Heusen on a TV special with Frank Sinatra and Bob Hope that was never produced. Jimmy told me that one day (circa 1942), he and his lyricist Johnny Burke were working at 20th Century-Fox composing for a film. While Burke was out of their writer's bungalow, Phil Silvers, the comedian, a friend to both, entered and suggested to Jimmy that they write a song for Johnny's wife, Bessie, who was soon to celebrate a birthday. Silvers provided the lyrics, later revised by Van Heusen and Burke. At the party they sang "Bessie ... with the laughing face." It was such a hit that they used it at other female birthday events. When they sang it as "Nancy ... with the laughing face" at little Nancy Sinatra's birthday party, Frank broke down and cried, thinking it had been written especially for his daughter; the trio wisely didn't correct him. Jimmy assigned his royalties to Nancy after Frank recorded it for Columbia in 1944.

== Notable recordings ==
- Pharoah Sanders, William Henderson, Stafford James, Eccleston W. Wainwright - Welcome to Love (1991)
- Cannonball Adderley, Bill Evans, Percy Heath, Connie Kay - Know What I Mean? (1961)
- Karrin Allyson - Ballads: Remembering John Coltrane (2001)
- Ray Charles - Dedicated To You (1961)
- John Coltrane - Ballads (1962)
- Paul Desmond - Live (1975)
- Kurt Elling - Dedicated to You: Kurt Elling Sings the Music of Coltrane and Hartman (2009)
- The Fleetwoods - Softly (1961)
- The Four Freshmen - Voices in Standards (1996), Four Freshmen And Five Saxes/The Four Freshmen and Five Guitars (1998)
- The Johnny Mann Singers - The Songs of Sinatra (1962)
- Flip Phillips - Phillips Head (1975)
- Frank Sinatra - Sinatra's Sinatra (1963)

== In popular culture ==
- In the Sopranos episode, "Watching Too Much Television," Paulie Gualtieri returns from jail to a big welcome back party at the Bada Bing! club. Following a group toast, Silvio Dante cues up some music and "Nancy (with the Laughing Face)" begins to play. Paulie, lost in emotion for a few moments, finally smiles and says "my song." Bobby Bacala is seen asking Silvio "What the fuck? Why is this his song?"
- The song was a favorite of President Ronald Reagan (whose wife was named Nancy), with Frank Sinatra singing a rendition entitled "Nancy (with the Reagan Face)" at his first inaugural ball in 1981.
- In the British Sitcom Fresh Fields this song is referenced by William when his mother-in-law Nancy has her portrait painted by his wife Hester.
- In the 1991 film Hear My Song, star (and screenplay co-writer) Adrian Dunbar performs the song. It's also on the soundtrack album.
