= Huntington Ashram Monastery =

Studio album by Alice Coltrane
- Released: 1969
- Recorded: 14 May 1969
- Studio: Coltrane home studios, Dix Hills, New York
- Genre: Post-bop, avant-garde jazz
- Length: 35:59
- Label: Impulse! Records
- Producer: Alice Coltrane

Alice Coltrane chronology
A Monastic Trio (1968)	Huntington Ashram Monastery (1969)	Ptah, the El Daoud (1970)

Huntington Ashram Monastery is the second solo album by Alice Coltrane. It was recorded in May 1969 at the Coltrane home studios in Dix Hills, New York, and was initially released later that year by John Coltrane Records, which was absorbed by Impulse! Records. On the album, Coltrane is heard on harp and piano, and is joined by bassist Ron Carter and drummer Rashied Ali.

In 2011, Impulse! reissued the album, along with World Galaxy, as part of a compilation titled Huntington Ashram Monastery/World Galaxy.

== Reception ==
Professional ratings
Review scores
Source	Rating
AllMusic	4/5 stars

The AllMusic review awarded the album 4 stars. Thom Jurek noted Coltrane's "majestically meditative harp" on the first half of the album, and remarked that her piano playing on the second half "bring[s] the free jazz component into focus."

Regarding the pieces featuring harp, Chris M. Slawecki of All About Jazz wrote that they "pivot their internal (meditative) and external (exploratory) faces upon the fulcrum of Carter's repetitive, throbbing bass, even though their swirling movements and rhythms, especially from Coltrane's harp, sound static, nearly floating." He stated that, on the works with piano, the instrument's "less heavenly, more temporal sound seems to root them in more earthly styles," and noted that "the spiritual overtones, and multiplicity and sheer volume of her notes" invite comparison with McCoy Tyner. AAJ's Chris May called the recording a "beautiful, sumptuous album," and wrote that, for the most part, it "suggests rather than delivers astral jazz," noting that "the root of the music is straight-ahead."

Author Max Brzezinski singled out "Turiya" for praise, and stated that it "produces mesmeric effects." He commented: "It suspends the listener in a cloud of lush textures, as each instrumentalist begins pursuing their own slow tempos, improvising until they find a shared sense of time... 'Turiya' doesn't develop in the traditional sense so much as it experiments with endless variations on a theme."

== Track listing ==
All compositions by Alice Coltrane

Side A
No.	Title	Length
1.	"Huntington Ashram Monastery"	5:36
2.	"Turiya"	4:22
3.	"Paramahansa Lake"	4:37

Side B
No.	Title	Length
4.	"Via Sivanandagar"	6:09
5.	"IHS ("I Have Suffered")"	8:50
6.	"Jaya Jaya Rama"	6:25
Total length:		35:59

== Personnel ==
- Alice Coltrane – harp (tracks 1–3), piano (tracks 4–6)
- Ron Carter – bass
- Rashied Ali – drums
