= Elevation (Pharoah Sanders album) =

Live album by Pharoah Sanders

Live album by Pharoah Sanders
- Released: 1974
- Recorded: September 7, 9 & 14, 1973
- Genres: Jazz, free jazz, ethno jazz
- Length: 47:18
- Label: Impulse!
- Producer: Ed Michel

Pharoah Sanders chronology
| Love in Us All (1974) | Elevation (1974) | Pharoah (1977) |

Elevation is a live album by American saxophonist and composer Pharoah Sanders (containing one track recorded in the studio), released in 1973 on the Impulse! label.

== Reception ==
Professional ratings
Review scores
| Source | Rating |
|---|---|
| AllMusic | 3/5 stars |
| The Encyclopedia of Popular Music | 3/5 stars |
| The Penguin Guide to Jazz Recordings | 3/4 stars |
| Uncut | 8/10 |

The AllMusic review by Thom Jurek stated: "This may not rate as highly as some of Sanders' other recordings for the label like Thembi or Karma, but there is plenty here for fans, and it is well worth the investigation and the purchase."

Brian P. Lonergan of All About Jazz compared the album to Alice Coltrane's Journey in Satchidananda, on which Sanders appeared, noting that it "shares much of the ambiance and sonic palette" of that recording, and stated that it "ventures into some pretty bizarre and wild territory."

== Uses in film ==
The title track was used in the movie Roman J. Israel, Esq.. In an interview, Denzel Washington said he suggested the song to the film's director, as it was one of his favourite albums growing up.

== Track listing ==
All compositions by Pharoah Sanders except as indicated

1. "Elevation" – 18:01
2. "Greeting to Saud (Brother McCoy Tyner)" – 4:07
3. "Ore-Se-Rere" (Ebenezer Obey) – 5:38
4. "The Gathering" – 13:51
5. "Spiritual Blessing" – 5:41
- Recorded in performance at the Ash Grove in Los Angeles, California, on September 7, 1973 (tracks 3 & 4), and September 9, 1973 (tracks 1 & 5), and at Wally Heider Studios in San Francisco, California, on September 13, 1973 (track 2)

== Personnel ==
- Pharoah Sanders – tenor saxophone, soprano saxophone, shaker, vocals, bells, percussion
- Joe Bonner – piano, harmonium, cow horn, wood flute, percussion, vocals
- Calvin Hill – bass, vocals, tambura
- Michael Carvin – drums, vocals
- Lawrence Killian – conga, bell tree, vocals
- John Blue (tracks 3 & 4), Jimmy Hopps (tracks 1, 2 & 5) – percussion, vocals
- Michael White – violin (track 2)
- Kenneth Nash – percussion (track 2)
- Sedatrius Brown – vocals (track 2)

== Charts ==
Chart performance for Elevation
| Chart (2026) | Peak position |
|---|---|
| UK Jazz & Blues Albums (Official Charts) | 13 |
| US Top Contemporary Jazz Albums (Billboard) | 14 |
