= Cosmic Transitions =

Studio album by Isaiah Collier & The Chosen Few
- Released: 12 May 2021
- Recorded: 23 September 2020
- Studio: Van Gelder Studio
- Genre: Free jazz; spiritual jazz
- Length: 56:27
- Label: Division 81

Isaiah Collier & The Chosen Few chronology
Lift Every Voice (EP) (2020)	Cosmic Transitions (2021)	Beyond (2022)

Cosmic Transitions is the second studio album by jazz quartet Isaiah Collier & The Chosen Few. It was released via Division 81 on 12 May 2021. The 56-minute album is split into 5 parts, which are based on planet Mercury's retrograde. Isaiah Collier & The Chosen Few is fronted by saxophonist Isaiah Collier, and also includes pianist Mike King, bassist Jeremiah Hunt, and drummer Michael Shekwoaga Ode.

== Recording and composition ==
The album was recorded in the Van Gelder Studio in New Jersey, United States, on 23 September 2020, which would have been John Coltrane's 94th birthday. The album was inspired by Coltrane's A Love Supreme. The beginning of Cosmic Transitions features chimes, shakers and a Tibetan singing bowl.

== Critical reception ==
Professional ratings
Review scores
Source	Rating
DownBeat	5/5 stars
Mojo	4/5 stars

Joshua Myers of DownBeat praised the album in their review for its honor of jazz tradition. They also wrote, "From the downbeat, with a literal tolling of the bell, until the final note that finds Collier improvising, forcing the limits of his soprano saxophone, Cosmic Transitions is like the moments after an afternoon rainstorm." Mojo's Ben Thompson praised the performances of Mike King and Michael Shekwoaga Ode. Thompson also touched on the jazz tradition, writing "Cosmic Transitions’ greatest challenge was to feel and sound like a vital piece of collective self-expression rather than a carefully staged exercise in historical reconstruction."

Marcus J. Moore of Bandcamp Daily praised the album for how it pays homage to Coltrane and the studio, while asserting that it "stands well on its own." Moore writes, "It’s not only the best album in his short discography, it’s one of the most rewarding listens of the year so far." Leor Galil of the Chicago Reader called Collier a "vital force" in the Chicago jazz scene. Describing the album, Galil writes, "Collier guides his unit through passages tense and acerbic enough to throw every knobby detail into sharp relief, and he’s just as assured when he allows that agitation to dissolve into restrained and mellow complexity."

== Track listing ==
Cosmic Transitions track listing
No.	Title	Length
1.	"Invocation"	6:35
2.	"I. Forgiveness"	9:58
3.	"Part II. Humility"	10:18
4.	"Part III. Understanding"	11:20
5.	"Part IV. Truth and Guidance"	3:14
6.	"Part V. Mercury's Retrograde"	15:01
Total length:		56:27

=== Notes ===
- On the Bandcamp release, tracks one and two, as well as tracks four and five are merged.
- On some versions of the release, the roman numerals are stylized with spaces between characters (e.g. "I V").
