= Crescent with Love =

Studio album by Pharoah Sanders
- Released: 1993
- Recorded: October 19 & 20, 1992
- Venue: Sear Sound, New York City
- Genre: Jazz
- Length: 1:28:38
- Label: Venus; TKCV-79001

Pharoah Sanders chronology
Welcome to Love (1991)	Crescent with Love (1993)	Message from Home (1996)

Crescent with Love is an album by saxophonist Pharoah Sanders. It was recorded in October 1992 at Sear Sound Studio in New York City, and was released by Venus Records in 1993. On the album, Sanders is joined by pianist William Henderson, bassist Charles Fambrough, and drummer Sherman Ferguson.

== Reception ==
Professional ratings
Review scores
Source	Rating
All About Jazz	5/5 stars
AllMusic	4/5 stars
The Penguin Guide to Jazz	4/4 stars
The Rolling Stone Jazz & Blues Album Guide	3/5 stars

Writing for AllMusic, Scott Yanow remarked: "Although there are some passionate moments, this is actually one of his mellower sessions... There are some heated moments... but Sanders's trademark screeches are at a minimum this time around."

The authors of the Penguin Guide to Jazz Recordings awarded the album 4 stars, calling Sanders's group "a perfectly balanced band," and commenting: "The 25th anniversary of Coltrane's death spawned a rash of tribute albums, few of them as apostolically convincing as this... Sanders sounds thoughtful and even a little wistful, as befits a tribute to his friend, but he never lets his playing drift into sentiment. A strong, creative record, perhaps the only one of the recent batch that can be considered essential."

In a review for All About Jazz, Chris May stated: "Without at any time attempting to 'be' Coltrane, retaining his own singular sound and style throughout, Sanders creates a uniquely vibrant evocation of Coltrane's genius at particular time in his development. Interestingly — some may say happily — the particular time Sanders chooses to evoke is not the late period Coltrane with which he'd personally been involved... Crescent with Love is... one of Sanders's finest mature albums. The sound he developed alongside Coltrane, and then burnished and refined on his own late 1960s/early 1970s albums, is here in its full grown-up glory—out there but lyrical, multiphonic but mellifluous... Magnificent music through and through."

== Track listing ==
1. "Lonnie's Lament" (John Coltrane) - 7:55
2. "Misty" (Erroll Garner) - 5:46
3. "In a Sentimental Mood" (Duke Ellington) - 6:37
4. "Softly for Shyla" (William Henderson) - 3:45
5. "Wise One" (John Coltrane) - 13:44
6. "Too Young to Go Steady" (Jimmy McHugh) - 5:58
7. "Body and Soul" (Johnny Green) - 9:00
8. "Naima" (John Coltrane) - 6:44
9. "Feeling Good" (Anthony Newley) - 7:16
10. "Light at the Edge of the World" (Gian Piero Piccioni) - 6:24
11. "Crescent" (John Coltrane) - 9:50
12. "After the Rain" (John Coltrane) - 5:39

== Personnel ==
- Pharoah Sanders – tenor saxophone
- William Henderson – piano
- Charles Fambrough – bass
- Sherman Ferguson – drums
