= With a Heartbeat =

Studio album by Pharoah Sanders and Graham Haynes
- Released: 2003
- Recorded: 2003
- Studio: Orange Music, West Orange, New Jersey
- Genre: Jazz
- Length: 49:41
- Label: Evolver; EVL2015-2
- Producer: Bill Laswell

Pharoah Sanders chronology
| The Creator Has a Master Plan (2003) | With a Heartbeat (2003) | In the Beginning 1963–1964 (2012) |

With a Heartbeat is an album by saxophonist Pharoah Sanders and cornetist Graham Haynes. It was recorded in West Orange, New Jersey, in 2003, and was released later that year by Evolver, a sub-label of Instinct Records. On the album, which is based on heartbeat sounds recorded by Dr. Jean-Louis Zink, Sanders and Haynes are joined by guitarist Nicky Skopelitis, keyboardist Jeff Bova, and tabla player Trilok Gurtu. The album was produced by Bill Laswell, who also plays bass, keyboards, and flute, and is Sanders' third recording to be produced by Laswell.

== Reception ==
Professional ratings
Review scores
| Source | Rating |
|---|---|
| AllMusic | 3/5 stars |
| The Encyclopedia of Popular Music | 3/5 stars |
| The Penguin Guide to Jazz | 2/4 stars |

In a review for AllMusic, Sean Westergaard wrote that the heartbeat-based music "comes off far better in execution than one might expect," and noted: "Pharoah Sanders' playing is excellent, and the album is enjoyable, but one gets the sense that this is Laswell's project, and Pharoah just plays on it."

The authors of The Penguin Guide to Jazz Recordings stated that Graham Haynes "impresses," and commented: "As a side-project for a cardiologist, it must have been a gas; as a jazz record it falls pretty short."

Brian Gilmore of Jazz Times remarked: "On With a Heartbeat, Sanders has probably gone to some of the places that Trane would go now were he still around. But he has also gone some places that weren't even imaginable when Trane was recording late in his life."

== Track listing ==
1. "Across Time" – 17:06
2. "Morning Tala" – 7:45
3. "Alankara (Beats of the Heart)" – 8:58
4. "Gamaka" – 15:52

== Personnel ==
- Pharoah Sanders – tenor saxophone, flute
- Graham Haynes – cornet, electronics
- Nicky Skopelitis – guitar, electric sitar
- Jeff Bova – keyboards
- Bill Laswell – bass, keyboards, flute
- Trilok Gurtu – tabla, voice
- Dr. Jean-Louis Zink – recorded heartbeats
