= Welcome to Love =

Studio album by Pharoah Sanders
- Released: 1991
- Recorded: July 17–19, 1990
- Studios: Studio Gimmick, Yerres, France
- Genre: Jazz
- Length: 70:04
- Label: Timeless CDSJP 358
- Producers: Russ Musto and Tetsuo Hara

Pharoah Sanders chronology
Moon Child (1990)	Welcome to Love (1991)	Crescent with Love (1993)

Welcome to Love (subtitled Pharoah Sanders Plays Beautiful Ballads) is an album led by saxophonist Pharoah Sanders recorded in 1990 and first released on the Dutch Timeless label. The album features jazz standards, many of which were also recorded by John Coltrane.

== Reception ==
Professional ratings
Review scores
Source	Rating
AllMusic	4.5/5 stars
The Penguin Guide to Jazz Recordings	3.5/4 stars
The Rolling Stone Jazz & Blues Album Guide	3/5 stars
The Virgin Encyclopedia of Jazz	3/5 stars

In his review for AllMusic, Steve Loewy commented: "This performance has held up well through the years, and while the thin, reserved approach is reminiscent of Coltrane, it is still marked with Pharoah's print".

The authors of The Penguin Guide to Jazz Recordings called the album "elaborate," and stated that "much of the credit has to go to... Wainwright, who... certainly can't be short of work playing as he does."

Marc Myers of All About Jazz described the recording as "one of Sanders' finest albums from his re-thinking period," and wrote that it is "an ideal introduction to Sanders and a stepping-stone to the saxophonist's more inventive, spiritual pieces."

Jazz Fuel's Matt Fripp included the album in his selection of "Ten Iconic Pharoah Sanders Albums," and commented: "The playing is supremely mature and shows a deep understanding and appreciation of the material. On the surface and in comparison to his earlier releases, Sanders might, on casual glance, appear to have become entrenched in a kind of conservative, nostalgic reverie to a by-gone age, but deeper listening reveals beautiful, melodic music making by all involved here."

== Track listing ==
1. "You Don't Know What Love Is" (Gene DePaul, Don Raye) - 4:55
2. "The Nearness of You" (Hoagy Carmichael, Ned Washington) - 5:18
3. "My One and Only Love" (Robert Mellin, Guy Wood) - 8:06
4. "I Want to Talk About You" (Billy Eckstine) - 8:14
5. "Soul Eyes" (Mal Waldron) - 9:22
6. "Nancy (With the Laughing Face)" (Jimmy Van Heusen, Phil Silvers) - 6:54
7. "Polka Dots and Moonbeams" (Johnny Burke, Van Heusen) - 7:21
8. "Say It (Over and Over Again)" (Frank Loesser, Jimmy McHugh) - 6:57
9. "Lament" (J. J. Johnson) - 6:13
10. "The Bird Song" (Pharoah Sanders) - 6:50
11. "Moonlight in Vermont" (John Blackburn, Karl Suessdorf) - 6:14 Bonus track on Japanese CD

== Personnel ==
- Pharoah Sanders - tenor saxophone, soprano saxophone
- William Henderson - piano
- Stafford James - bass
- Eccleston W. Wainwright Jr. - drums
