= Spirits (Pharoah Sanders album) =

Live album by Pharoah Sanders, Hamid Drake, and Adam Rudolph
- Released: 2000
- Recorded: July 4, 1998
- Venue: Montreal Jazz Festival
- Genre: Free jazz
- Length: 1:00:19
- Label: Meta; MAH / META 004
- Producer: Adam Rudolph, Hamid Drake, Pharoah Sanders

Pharoah Sanders chronology
Save Our Children (1998)	Spirits (2000)	The Creator Has a Master Plan (2003)

Spirits is a live album by saxophonist Pharoah Sanders on which he is joined by percussionists Hamid Drake and Adam Rudolph. It was recorded on July 4, 1998, at the Montreal Jazz Festival, and was released in 2000 by Meta Records. The album presents a continuous performance which can be heard as a three-part suite.

== Reception ==
Professional ratings
Review scores
Source	Rating
AllMusic	3.5/5 stars
The Penguin Guide to Jazz	3/4 stars
Uncut	8/10

In a review for AllMusic, Michael G. Nastos called the album "a beautiful statement," and wrote: "The music is as the title suggests: spiritual, multi-ethnic, mostly serene, and quite improvisationally derived... Fans of Sanders will be easily able to connect this music with his past glories... Recommended."

The authors of The Penguin Guide to Jazz Recordings noted: "This is one of the most satisfying of Sanders's recent recordings... Pharoah is blowing with a magisterial ease and authority. A challenging format, but the bearded one more than rises to the challenge."

Bill Shoemaker of Jazz Times described Spirits as "a moving concert recording," and stated that Sanders "listens intently, and he soars as a result... Spirits... has the centered glow of indigenous music as well as the occasional jazz spark. As a result, Sanders has a new credibility as an elder of timeless traditions."

Chris May of All About Jazz called the recording "a beautiful album," and commented: "Spirits is stripped-down astral jazz... but is no less transporting than those of his albums in the style featuring bigger lineups." AAJ's Derek Taylor remarked: "Throughout all of the tracks Sanders unintentionally answers his critics proving that his sound hasn't mellowed over the years, it's expanded. There is every bit of the fire of his 60s work infused in his sound today; it's simply been enlarged and enhanced by the advent of age." AAJ writer Mark Corroto stated: "This is the Sanders of Karma, Shukuru, and Welcome to Love. If you have found this recording, treasure it, meditate with it, and somebody please sign Pharoah Sanders to a major label."

== Track listing ==
Composed by Hamid Drake, Adam Rudolph, and Pharoah Sanders

1. "Sunrise" – 19:12
2. "Morning in Soweto" – 5:00
3. "Thousand Petalled Lotus" – 6:59
4. "I and Thou" – 2:05
5. "Uma Lake" – 3:14
6. "Ancient Peoples" – 7:35
7. "Calling to the Luminous Beings" – 5:54
8. "Roundhouse" – 2:28
9. "Molimo" – 2:44
10. "Sunset" – 5:08

== Personnel ==
- Pharoah Sanders – tenor saxophone, vocals, wood flutes, percussion
- Hamid Drake – trap drums, vocals, percussion, tabla, frame drums
- Adam Rudolph – congas, percussion, thumb piano, talking drum, bamboo flute, overtone singing, gong
