= Tauhid (album) =

1967 jazz album by Pharoah Sanders

Studio album by Pharoah Sanders
- Released: October 1967
- Recorded: November 15, 1966
- Studio: Van Gelder, Englewood Cliffs, NJ
- Genre: Avant-garde jazz
- Length: 34:40
- Label: Impulse!
- Producer: Bob Thiele

Pharoah Sanders chronology
Pharoah's First (1965)	Tauhid (1967)	Karma (1969)

Tauhid is a jazz album by saxophonist Pharoah Sanders. It was the second album released under his name, and his first album on the Impulse! label. It was recorded on November 15, 1966 at Van Gelder Studio in Englewood Cliffs, NJ, four days after the concert heard on the John Coltrane album Offering: Live at Temple University, and was released in 1967, after the death of Coltrane, with whom Sanders had played since 1965. Tauhid was reissued in 2017 on Anthology Recordings. The album marks guitarist Sonny Sharrock's first appearance on a record, as well as one of pianist Dave Burrell's earliest recordings.

In the album liner notes, Sanders wrote: "I don't really see the horn anymore. I'm trying to see myself. And similarly, as to the sounds I get, it's not that I'm trying to scream on my horn, I'm just trying to put all my feelings into the horn. And when you do that, the notes go away... Why [do] I want clusters [of notes]? So that I [can] get more feeling, more of me, into every note I play. You see, everything you do has to mean something, has to be more than just notes. That's behind everything I do – trying to get more ways of getting feeling out."

== Reception ==
Professional ratings
Review scores
Source	Rating
AllMusic	3/5 stars
DownBeat	4/5 stars
Pitchfork	8.2/10
The Rolling Stone Jazz & Blues Album Guide	2/5 stars
Uncut	8/10

Gary Giddins referred to Tauhid as "the first and best of Pharoah Sanders's Impulse albums." Chris May, writing for All About Jazz, called Tauhid "arguably the finest statement in [Sanders'] astral oeuvre," and states that "Of all Sanders' Impulse! albums... Tauhid has the best sound." In his review for AllMusic, Al Campbell notes that "Sanders' tenor appearance doesn't saturate the atmosphere on this session; far from it. Sanders is content to patiently let the moods of these three pieces develop..."

Writing on the Red Bull Music Academy web site, Andy Beta stated: "Drawing on his travels through Japan with Coltrane's group, as well as his reading about ancient Egypt, Tauhid balanced the incendiary sax shredding of Sanders' years with Coltrane with a newfound lyricism and patience, letting each song unfold at a natural pace. And with the guitar of Sonny Sharrock adding both furious noise and nimble R&B chording that gave the sidelong 'Upper Egypt & Lower Egypt' its melodic hook, Sanders' work began to resonate beyond jazz as The Stooges and MC5 incorporated the spirit of Sanders into their proto-punk sound."

Will Schube called Tauhid "a perceptive insight into Sanders' mission, balancing jazz's studious technical aspects with a contemplative verve that lends his playing a striking looseness. It's in this balance that Sanders has remained an inspiration for the modern incarnations of spiritual jazz. Sanders' style is at once both deconstructive and innovative. Taking the tenants [sic] of jazz, he works backwards, stripping its tropes bare and rebuilding the genre in his own image. The playing strikes a balance, constantly driving yet stripped-down in its search for a capital-t Truth... Sanders was working in a style of jazz out-there enough for the most adventurous of listeners, but in control of his vision to such a thorough degree that even the most casual of jazz fans could find a lick, a melody, or a solo to latch onto."

In a review for Pitchfork, Daniel Martin-McCormick wrote: "Tauhid... plays like a mission statement. At the helm of an all-star sextet... Sanders leads the group through three pieces that transcend the traditional 'head/solo/head' structure... On Tauhid, the pieces are suites that play like seances, with movements billowing and unfolding of their own accord. The group's unity is powerful, creating a spiritual atmosphere that casts a spell from the opening bars."

== Track listing ==
All songs written by Pharoah Sanders

1. "Upper Egypt and Lower Egypt" – 16:12
2. "Japan" – 3:22
3. "Medley: Aum/Venus/Capricorn Rising" – 14:46

== Personnel ==
- Pharoah Sanders – tenor saxophone, alto saxophone, piccolo, vocals
- Nat Bettis – percussion
- Roger Blank – drums
- Dave Burrell – piano
- Henry Grimes – bass
- Sonny Sharrock – guitar
