= Message from Home =

Studio album by Pharoah Sanders
- Released: 1996
- Studio: Sony, New York City; Greenpoint, Brooklyn, New York
- Genre: Jazz
- Length: 49:10
- Label: Verve; 314 529 578-2
- Producer: Bill Laswell

Pharoah Sanders chronology
Crescent with Love (1993)	Message from Home (1996)	Save Our Children (1998)

Message from Home is an album by saxophonist Pharoah Sanders. It was recorded in New York City and Brooklyn, New York, and was released in 1996 by Verve Records. On the album, which was produced by Bill Laswell, Sanders is joined by kora player Foday Musa Suso, guitarist Dominic Kanza, violinist Michael White, keyboardists William Henderson, Jeff Bova, and Bernie Worrell, bassists Charnett Moffett and Steve Neil, and percussionists Aiyb Dieng and Hamid Drake.

== Reception ==
Professional ratings
Review scores
Source	Rating
AllMusic	3/5 stars
Robert Christgau	A−
The Encyclopedia of Popular Music	3/5 stars
The Penguin Guide to Jazz	2.5/4 stars
The Rolling Stone Jazz & Blues Album Guide	3/5 stars

In a review for AllMusic, Richard S. Ginell wrote: "The world music-minded producer Bill Laswell gets a hold of Pharoah Sanders here and lo, the sleeping volcano erupts with one of his most fulfilling albums in many a year... This resurrection will quicken the pulse of many an old Pharoah fan."

The authors of The Penguin Guide to Jazz Recordings called the album "a disappointment after the high of Crescent With Love," and stated: "Sanders sounds almost flabby and because he has surrounded himself with a mechanical, electronic sound, the weakness of the front line sinks in with every repeat hearing."

Robert Christgau commented: "this putatively commercial move ventures into the unknown. With his fabulous sound, un-American activities, and grandly simple musical ideas, the man was made for Bill Laswell's world-jazz strategems."

Writing for the Chicago Reader, Neil Tesser remarked that, with the album, Laswell "for once got it right," and noted: "while he used a modicum of modern tech wizardry and a few new dance beats to dress up the music for today, he clearly intended to return Sanders to the long-limbed spirituality of his 70s dates, and he succeeded."

CMJ New Music Monthly's James Lien stated that the album features "a heady range of musical styles," and "some of Pharoah's best playing in decades."

== Track listing ==
"Kumba" composed by Pharoah Sanders and Foday Musa Suso. Remaining tracks composed by Pharoah Sanders.

1. "Our Roots (Began in Africa)" – 10:21
2. "Nozipho" – 9:43
3. "Tomoki" – 6:26
4. "Ocean Song" – 8:49
5. "Kumba" – 7:50
6. "Country Mile" – 6:03

== Personnel ==
- Pharoah Sanders – tenor saxophone, flute, bells, vocals, singing bowl
- Foday Musa Suso – kora, vocals
- Dominic Kanza – guitar
- Michael White – violin
- William Henderson – electric piano, piano, vocals
- Jeff Bova – keyboards
- Bernie Worrell – keyboards, vocals
- Charnett Moffett – acoustic bass
- Steve Neil – bass
- Aiyb Dieng – percussion, congas, bells, gong, vocals
- Hamid Drake – drums, tabla, percussion, vocals
- Fanta Mangasuba – backing vocals
- Fatumata Sako – backing vocals
- Mariama Suso – backing vocals
- Salie Suso – backing vocals
