= Journey in Satchidananda =

Studio album by Alice Coltrane
- Released: February 1971
- Recorded: July 4 ("Isis and Osiris") and November 8 (studio tracks), 1970
- Venue: Village Gate (track B2)
- Studios: Coltrane home studios, Dix Hills, New York (tracks A1–B1)
- Genres: Spiritual jazz; modal jazz; avant-garde jazz
- Length: 37:13
- Label: Impulse!
- Producers: Alice Coltrane, Ed Michel

Alice Coltrane chronology
Ptah, the El Daoud (1970)	Journey in Satchidananda (1971)	Universal Consciousness (1971)

Journey in Satchidananda is the fourth studio album by the American jazz pianist and harpist Alice Coltrane, released in February 1971 on Impulse! Records. The first four tracks were recorded at Coltrane's home studio in Dix Hills, New York, in November 1970, while "Isis and Osiris" was recorded live at the Village Gate in Greenwich Village in July of that year. Coltrane is joined on the album by saxophonist Pharoah Sanders, bassists Cecil McBee and Charlie Haden, and drummer Rashied Ali. Vishnu Wood also appears on oud on "Isis and Osiris", while the studio recordings also feature Majid Shabazz on percussion and Tulsi on tanpura.

Journey in Satchidananda marks a transition between Coltrane's first three albums and her subsequent releases, which reveal a more personalized outlook. The album's title and title track reflect the influence of Swami Satchidananda Saraswati, whom Coltrane had studied under and become close to.

"Shiva-Loka", or "realm of Shiva", refers to Shiva's role as the third member of the Hindu trinity, the "dissolver of creation". "Stopover Bombay" refers to a five-week stay in India and Sri Lanka on which Coltrane was due to go in December 1970. "Something About John Coltrane" is based on themes by her late husband. "Isis and Osiris" demonstrates Coltrane's interest in Middle Eastern and North African music and culture. The presence of the tanpura reflects Coltrane's interest in Indian classical music and religion.

== Reception ==
Professional ratings
Review scores
Source	Rating
AllMusic	5/5 stars
DownBeat	4/5 stars
The Penguin Guide to Jazz Recordings	2.5/4 stars
Pitchfork	10/10
The Rolling Stone Jazz & Blues Album Guide	4/5 stars

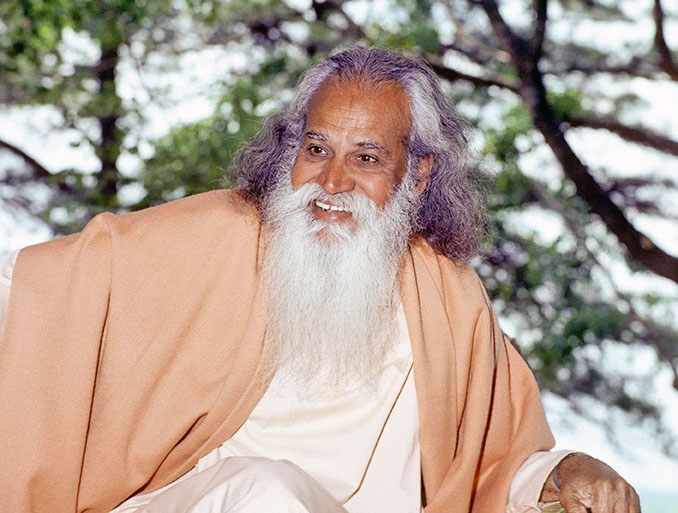
Swami Satchidananda in 1982

The editors of AllMusic awarded the album five of five stars, with Thom Jurek stating: "This is a remarkable album, and necessary for anyone interested in the development of modal and experimental jazz. It's also remarkably accessible."

The album was ranked number 446 in the 2020 edition of Rolling Stone magazine's 500 Greatest Albums of All Time list. The editors of the list deemed it "a meditative bliss-out like jazz had never seen: part earthy blues and part ethereal mantra, and a potent influence on sonic seekers from Radiohead to Coltrane's grandnephew Flying Lotus."

Pitchfork's Josephine Livingstone gave the album a perfect score, noting that it "pays full tribute to the transformation that [Coltrane] underwent in the late 1960s—as a human being and artist...the very texture of Journey is defined by transition, process, and flow. Its music has no beginning or end. Instead...Coltrane is working with the principle of looping and transcendence."

Writing for Treble, and referring to the loss of Coltrane's husband, Emma Bauchner remarked: "Journey in Satchidananda feels like a culmination of sorts: a collision of loss with newfound understanding and self-expression. The music occupies the liminal spaces between East and West, post-bop and raga, grief and healing, consciousness and transcendence... More than anything, Journey in Satchidananda's magnificent soundscapes carry a deep sense of healing, reflecting Coltrane's own journey and subsequent transformation in the face of grief."

In an article for The Guardian, Jennifer Lucy Allan described the album as "a mid-point between the modal and meditative, where all the parts of her musical being and biography are present," and wrote: "It ought strictly to be called fusion music, with elements taken from Indian music and combined with western traditions, but in Coltrane’s music there are no visible joins – all is bound in cosmic opulence."

Colleen Murphy of Classical Album Sundays described the album as "a truly deep, far out, transformative listening experience," and remarked: "you may also temporarily achieve a higher state of consciousness while listening to this album. Take the journey."

NPR's Sydnee Monday stated: "Almost 50 years after Journey In Satchidananda was released, the album remains a vision of universal healing, spiritual self-preservation in times of trouble and the god that appears when you seek her out."

== Track listing ==
All compositions by Alice Coltrane.

Side A
No.	Title	Length
1.	"Journey in Satchidananda"	6:36
2.	"Shiva-Loka"	6:33
3.	"Stopover Bombay"	2:52
Total length:		16:01

Side B
No.	Title	Length
4.	"Something About John Coltrane"	9:40
5.	"Isis and Osiris"	11:32
Total length:		21:12 37:13

== Personnel ==
tracks A1 to B1

- Alice Coltrane – harp (A1, A2), piano (A3, B1)
- Pharoah Sanders – soprano saxophone, percussion
- Cecil McBee – double bass
- Rashied Ali – drums
- Tulsi Sen Gupta – tanpura
- Majid Shabazz – bells, tambourine

track B2

- Alice Coltrane – harp
- Pharoah Sanders – soprano saxophone, percussion
- Rashied Ali – drums
- Charlie Haden – double bass
- Vishnu Wood – oud

== Charts ==
Chart performance for Journey in Satchidananda
Chart (2024)	Peak position
Greek Albums (IFPI)	63
