= Save Our Children (album) =

Studio album by Pharoah Sanders
- Released: 1998
- Studio: Orange Music, West Orange, New Jersey
- Genre: Jazz
- Length: 1:01:23
- Label: Verve; 557 297
- Producer: Bill Laswell

Pharoah Sanders chronology
Message from Home (1996)	Save Our Children (1998)	Spirits (2000)

Save Our Children is an album by saxophonist Pharoah Sanders. It was recorded in West Orange, New Jersey, and was released in 1998 by Verve Records. On the album, which was produced by Bill Laswell, Sanders is joined by keyboardists Jeff Bova, William Henderson, and Bernie Worrell, harmonium player Tony Cedras, bassist Alex Blake, and percussionists Trilok Gurtu and Zakir Hussain. Abiodun Oyewole, Asante, and Abdou Mboup also provide vocals on one track. Save Our Children was Sanders' second release with Verve, and the second to be produced by Laswell.

== Reception ==
Professional ratings
Review scores
Source	Rating
AllMusic	2/5 stars
The Penguin Guide to Jazz	2.5/4 stars
The Virgin Encyclopedia of Jazz	2/5 stars

In a review for AllMusic, Richard S. Ginell noted the album's "sleek, absorbing sound," and stated that, in comparison with Message from Home, "the ambience is mellower, the spirituality less fierce." He wrote: "Though the African percussive element is still present, it now takes a back seat to subtle layered electronics and influences from India and the Middle East, and the huge, passionate Pharoah sound of old is mostly toned-down and recessed."

Willard Jenkins, writing for Jazz Times, commented: "From the opening bars it's clear this is more about Bill Laswell's vision than Pharoah Sanders... If you could ever imagine Pharoah Sanders on smooth jazz radio, this might be the track. Come back Pharoah, and leave Laswell to lesser lights."

Joshua Klein of The A.V. Club remarked: "Save Our Children isn't the fiery free-jazz salvo of which [Sanders is] still capable; instead, the record is another eclectic hybrid that stays closely in sync with Laswell's one-world style... There's a sense of drifting peace cast over Save Our Children that often veers close to New Age, but as the harmoniums hum with Sanders on the meditative 'Kazuko,' it's hard to complain."

== Track listing ==
1. "Save Our Children" (Abdou Mboup, Abiodun Oyewole, Pharoah Sanders) – 7:52
2. "Midnight in Berkeley Square" (Eric Maschwitz, Manning Sherwin) – 9:17
3. "Jewels of Love" (Pharoah Sanders) – 14:00
4. "Kazuko" (Pharoah Sanders) – 10:15
5. "The Ancient Sounds" (Pharoah Sanders) – 10:51
6. "Far Off Sand" (Pharoah Sanders, Zakir Hussain) – 9:10

== Personnel ==
- Pharoah Sanders – tenor saxophone, soprano saxophone, percussion, vocals
- Jeff Bova – keyboards
- William Henderson – piano, harmonium
- Bernie Worrell – organ, electric piano, synthesizer
- Tony Cedras – harmonium
- Alex Blake – bass
- Trilok Gurtu – drums, tabla, percussion
- Zakir Hussain – tabla, vocals
- Abiodun Oyewole – vocals (track 1)
- Asante – vocals (track 1)
- Abdou Mboup – vocals, talking drum (track 1)
