= In the Beginning 1963–1964 =

Compilation album by Pharoah Sanders
- Released: 2012
- Recorded: 1963–1964
- Genre: Jazz
- Label: ESP-Disk

Pharoah Sanders chronology
With a Heartbeat (2003)	In the Beginning 1963–1964 (2012)	Live in Paris (1975) (Lost ORTF Recordings) (2020)

Professional ratings
Review scores
Source	Rating
Allmusic	4.5/5 stars

In the Beginning 1963–1964 is a 4-CD compilation album by American free jazz saxophonist Pharoah Sanders recorded in 1963-1964 and released in 2012 on the ESP-Disk label. It features previously unreleased recordings of Sanders performing with groups led by Don Cherry and Paul Bley, complete concert recordings of Sanders' appearances with Sun Ra, a re-release of Sanders' first album, and various interviews.

== Background ==
Sanders moved from Oakland, California to New York City in the early 1960s. Upon his arrival, he struggled to make a living and resorted to pawning his horn, working odd jobs, and sleeping on the subway. Eventually, a friend from California invited Sanders to stay with him in Brooklyn, which is where he met Don Cherry, with whom he soon began playing. Thanks to some gigs with Cherry, Sanders was able to get his horn out of pawn and have it repaired. Sanders recalled: "Cherry seemed to like what I was doing. I was getting different sounds out of the horn then. For my part I was just trying to express myself. Whatever came out of the instrument just came out, as if I had no choice." On January 6, 1963, Cherry, Sanders, pianist Joe Scianni, bassist David Izenzon, and drummer J.C. Moses visited Stereo Sound Studios, where they recorded the previously unreleased Cherry-led tracks that appear on In The Beginning 1963-1964.

Later that year, Sanders reconnected with John Coltrane, whom he had met previously while Coltrane was in California with Miles Davis's group, and with whom he would later record. Sanders also formed his own group which included John Hicks, Wilbur Ware, and Billy Higgins. On May 25 of the following year, Sanders again visited Stereo Sound Studios, this time at the invitation of pianist Paul Bley, who was also joined by bassist Izenzon and drummer Paul Motian, who had just left Bill Evans's group to join Bley. The Bley-led tracks that appear on In The Beginning 1963-1964 were previously unreleased.

Roughly four months later, Sanders entered a studio as a band leader for the first time, and recorded two extended tracks at the loft of audio engineer Jerry Newman using a group featuring bebop-oriented musicians, including trumpeter Stan Foster, pianist Jane Getz, bassist William Bennett, and drummer Marvin Pattillo. The tracks were released by ESP-Disk in 1965 as the third item in their catalog (number 1003) under the title Pharaoh. The album was later re-released with the titles Pharoah, Pharaoh Sanders Quintet, Pharoah Sanders Quintet, and Pharaoh's First, and the tracks are also included on In The Beginning 1963-1964.

During 1964, Sanders joined Sun Ra's group, substituting for John Gilmore, who had taken a leave of absence to play with Art Blakey. (Sanders had first encountered Sun Ra when he was working as a cook in a restaurant where the Arkestra regularly performed.) The tracks by Sun Ra that appear on In The Beginning 1963-1964 represent the first release of the complete concert recording of the band's performances at Judson Hall in New York City on December 30 and 31, 1964 as part of the "Four Days in December" festival sponsored by the Jazz Composers Guild. (Parts of the concert had previously appeared on Sun Ra Featuring Pharoah Sanders & Black Harold, the original release of which incorrectly listed the recording date as "15/6/64".)

The album also includes interviews with Sanders, Don Cherry, Paul Bley, ESP-Disk founder Bernard Stollman, and Sun Ra.

== Reception ==
In his AllMusic review, Thom Jurek called the album "one of those dream-come-true releases for avant-jazz archivists," stating that it "fills out the saxophonist's portrait considerably." Writing for JazzTimes, Scott Verrastro wrote: "these sessions shed some light on the development of Sanders’ vision, even though In the Beginning is less of a Sanders collection than a compendium of four of the avant-garde's leading innovators of that era." In his review for Cadence, Robert Iannapollo wrote: "As far as the music, for those who are looking for the Pharoah Sanders of Karma, Thembi or even Tauhid, this set might be a disappointment. But for those looking for his development into that player (and in the process, hearing some great Don Cherry, Paul Bley and Sun Ra), this set is well-worth investigating. In an article in Jazz Perspectives, Benjamin Bierman wrote: "These early recordings... document a solid player already able to speak in both avant-garde and more traditional idioms, giving an indication of where he would eventually land creatively."

== Track listings ==
=== Disc 1: Pharoah Sanders with Don Cherry and Paul Bley ===
1. Pharoah Sanders Interview - Coming to New York - 3:06
2. The Don Cherry Quintet: "Cocktail Piece" (First Variation) Take 1 (Don Cherry) - 4:03
3. The Don Cherry Quintet: "Cocktail Piece" (First Variation) Take 2 (Don Cherry) - 6:00
4. Studio Announcement - 0:08
5. The Don Cherry Quintet: "Cherry's Dilemma" (Don Cherry) - 4:13
6. Studio Engineer Announcement - 0:18
7. The Don Cherry Quintet: "Remembrance" (First Variation) (Don Cherry) - 5:26
8. The Don Cherry Quintet: Medley: Thelonious Monk Compositions ("Light Blue" / "Coming On The Hudson" / "Bye-Ya" / "Ruby My Dear") (Thelonious Monk) - 4:05
9. Don Cherry Interview - Ornette's Influence Pt. 1 - 3:19
10. Don Cherry Interview - Ornette's Influence Pt. 2 - 1:01
11. Paul Bley Interview - 1960's Avant Garde - 2:26
12. The Paul Bley Quartet: "Generous 1" Take 1 (Setting Levels) (Carla Bley) - 4:35
13. The Paul Bley Quartet: "Generous 1" Take 2 (Carla Bley) - 4:21
14. The Paul Bley Quartet: "Walking Woman" Take 1 (Carla Bley) - 2:04
15. The Paul Bley Quartet: "Walking Woman" Take 2 (Carla Bley) - 3:05
16. The Paul Bley Quartet: "Ictus" - 4:21
17. After Session Conversation - 0:37
- The Don Cherry Quintet was recorded on January 6, 1963, at Stereo Sound Studios, New York City by engineer Jerry Newman.
- The Paul Bley Quartet was recorded on May 25, 1964, at Stereo Sound Studios, New York City by engineer Jerry Newman.

=== Disc 2: Pharoah Sanders Quintet ===
1. Pharoah Sanders Interview - Musicians He Performed With Pt. 1 - 2:08
2. Bernard Stollman Interview - Meeting Pharoah Sanders - 0:54
3. The Pharoah Sanders Quintet: "Seven by Seven" (Pharoah Sanders) - 26:07
4. The Pharoah Sanders Quintet: "Bethera" (Pharoah Sanders) - 23:31
5. Pharoah Sanders Interview - Musicians He Performed With Pt. 2 - 4:35
- The Pharoah Sanders Quintet was recorded on September 10, 1964, at Stereo Sound Studios, New York City by engineer Jerry Newman.

=== Disc 3: Pharoah Sanders with Sun Ra ===
1. Pharoah Sanders Interview - Meeting Sun Ra - 1:44
2. Sun Ra & His Solar Arkestra: "Dawn over Israel" (Sun Ra) - 10:00
3. Sun Ra & His Solar Arkestra: "The Shadow World" (Sun Ra) - 22:08
4. Sun Ra & His Solar Arkestra: "The Second Stop Is Jupiter" (Sun Ra) - 2:17
5. Sun Ra & His Solar Arkestra: "Discipline #9" (Sun Ra) - 2:27
6. Sun Ra & His Solar Arkestra: "We Travel the Spaceways" (Sun Ra) - 9:10
- Sun Ra & His Solar Arkestra were recorded on December 30, 1964, live at Judson Hall, New York City.

=== Disc 4: Pharoah Sanders with Sun Ra ===
1. Sun Ra Interview - Being Neglected as an Artist - 2:49
2. Sun Ra & His Solar Arkestra: "Gods on Safari" (Sun Ra) - 3:43
3. Sun Ra & His Solar Arkestra: "The Shadow World" (Sun Ra) - 6:26
4. Sun Ra & His Solar Arkestra: "Rocket #9" (Sun Ra) - 3:58
5. Sun Ra & His Solar Arkestra: "The Voice of Pan Pt. 1" (Sun Ra) - 5:23
6. Sun Ra & His Solar Arkestra: "Dawn over Israel" (Sun Ra) - 3:43
7. Sun Ra & His Solar Arkestra: "Space Mates" (Sun Ra) - 2:42
8. Sun Ra & His Solar Arkestra: "The Voice of Pan Pt. 2" (Sun Ra) - 8:02
9. Sun Ra & His Solar Arkestra: "The Talking Drum" (Sun Ra) - 4:16
10. Sun Ra & His Solar Arkestra: "Conversation with Saturn" (Sun Ra) - 3:51
11. Sun Ra & His Solar Arkestra: "The Next Stop Mars" (Sun Ra) - 0:48
12. Sun Ra & His Solar Arkestra: "The Second Stop Is Jupiter" (Sun Ra) - 2:13
13. Sun Ra & His Solar Arkestra: "Pathway to the Outer Known" (Sun Ra) - 3:36
14. Sun Ra Interview - Meeting John Coltrane - 1:04
15. Pharoah Sanders Interview - John Coltrane - 3:26
16. Pharoah Sanders Interview - Playing at Slug's / Max Gordan - 1:05
17. Pharoah Sanders Interview - Closing Comments - 2:34
- Sun Ra & His Solar Arkestra were recorded on December 31, 1964, live at Judson Hall, New York City.

== Personnel ==
Disc 1: The Don Cherry Quintet

- Don Cherry - cornet, piano
- Pharoah Sanders - tenor saxophone
- Joe Scianni - piano
- David Izenzon - bass
- J.C. Moses - drums

Disc 1: The Paul Bley Quartet

- Pharoah Sanders - tenor saxophone
- Paul Bley - piano
- David Izenzon - bass
- Paul Motian - drums

Disc 2: The Pharoah Sanders Quintet

- Pharoah Sanders - tenor saxophone
- Stan Foster - trumpet
- Jane Getz - piano
- William Bennett - bass
- Marvin Pattillo - drums

Discs 3 and 4: Sun Ra & His Solar Arkestra

- Sun Ra - piano, celesta
- Pharoah Sanders - tenor saxophone
- Black Harold (Harold Murray) - flute and log drums
- Al Evans - trumpet
- Teddy Nance - trombone
- Marshall Allen - alto saxophone, flute, percussion
- Pat Patrick - baritone saxophone
- Alan Silva - bass
- Ronnie Boykins - bass
- Clifford Jarvis - drums
- Jimmhi Johnson - drums
- Art Jenkins - space voice
