= John Coltrane House =

Historic house in Pennsylvania, United States

- U.S. National Register of Historic Places
- U.S. National Historic Landmark
- Philadelphia Register of Historic Places
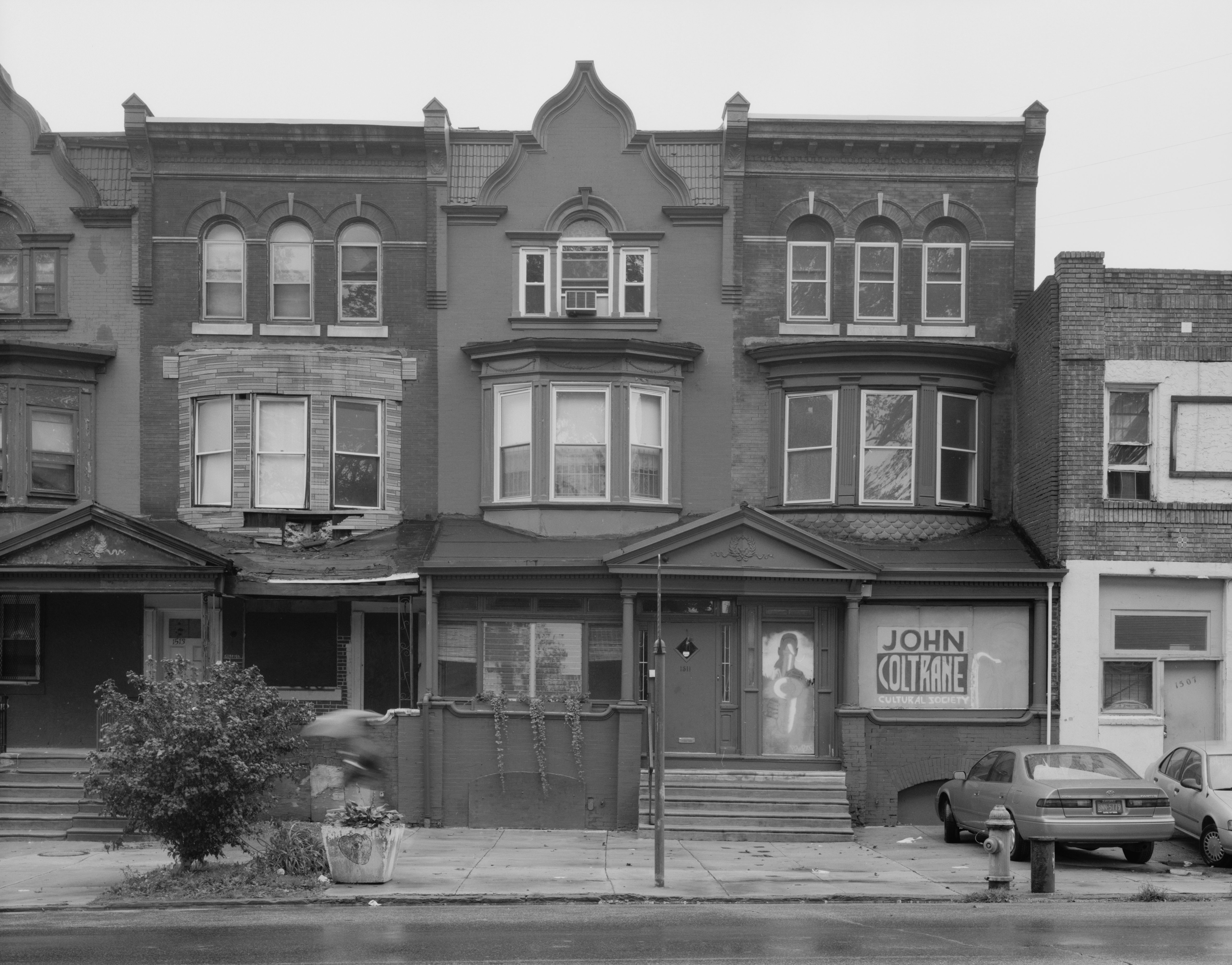

- Location within Philadelphia Location within Pennsylvania Location within the United States
- Location: 1511 North 33rd Street, Philadelphia, Pennsylvania
- Coordinates: 39°58′49.15″N 75°11′20.9″W
- Architect: E. Allen Wilson
- Architectural style: Colonial Revival
- NRHP reference No.: 99000628

Significant dates
- Added to NRHP: January 20, 1999
- Designated NHL: January 20, 1999
- Designated PRHP: December 18, 1985

The John Coltrane House is a historic house at 1511 North 33rd Street in Philadelphia, Pennsylvania, United States. A National Historic Landmark, it was the home of American saxophonist and jazz pioneer John Coltrane from 1952 until 1958. On his death in 1967 the house passed to his cousin Mary Alexander, who sold it in 2004. Efforts for restoration and reuse as a jazz venue initially struggled. In 2022, two of Coltrane's sons filed a lawsuit contesting the ownership of the home on the grounds that Mary Alexander had a life interest in the property, but not ownership or the right to sell. Following successful recovery of the property in 2024, the Coltrane family announced a collaboration with the African American Cultural Heritage Action Fund, a program of the National Trust for Historic Preservation, to re-envision a future for the house, including opening it to the public.

== Use by Coltrane ==
John Coltrane purchased the house for his family after leaving the U.S. Navy and lived there until he relocated to New York City in 1958. He continued to use the house as an alternate residence to his New York home until the end of his life. Upon his death the house passed to Coltrane's cousin, Mary Alexander.

== Architecture ==
In addition to its association with John Coltrane, the house has received attention due to its historic architecture. For example, it is considered a good example of a middle-class Philadelphia rowhouse from the turn of the 20th century. The architect is disputed; E. Allen Wilson is considered likely, due to his association with developer Clifford Pemberton, but no known source specifically ties him to the Coltrane House.

== Preservation and reuse efforts ==
=== John W. Coltrane Cultural Society ===
The house's use as a residence by Coltrane's relatives prevented it from being made open to the public, and by 2003 the house was suffering from several structural and aesthetic problems. In 1984 Mary Alexander co-founded the "John W. Coltrane Cultural Society" (JWCCS) to promote jazz and the legacy of John Coltrane. The Society established a John W. Coltrane Center adjacent to the John Coltrane House circa 1998, when Alexander was still living in the house.

The JWCCS offered children's workshops led by professional jazz artists throughout the Philadelphia School District, Philadelphia Housing Authority and other youth groups. An annual Summer Backyard Concert Series was held in the backyard of the Coltrane House and an annual Birthday Tribute/Celebration Concert at a large venue. A community garden on 33rd Street included a jazz mural created by neighborhood youth. A mural was also created by students of Strawberry Mansion High School, in the school. "Cousin Mary," who was raised with Coltrane in High Point North Carolina, also conducted a lecture series on his life and music.

=== Historic designation ===
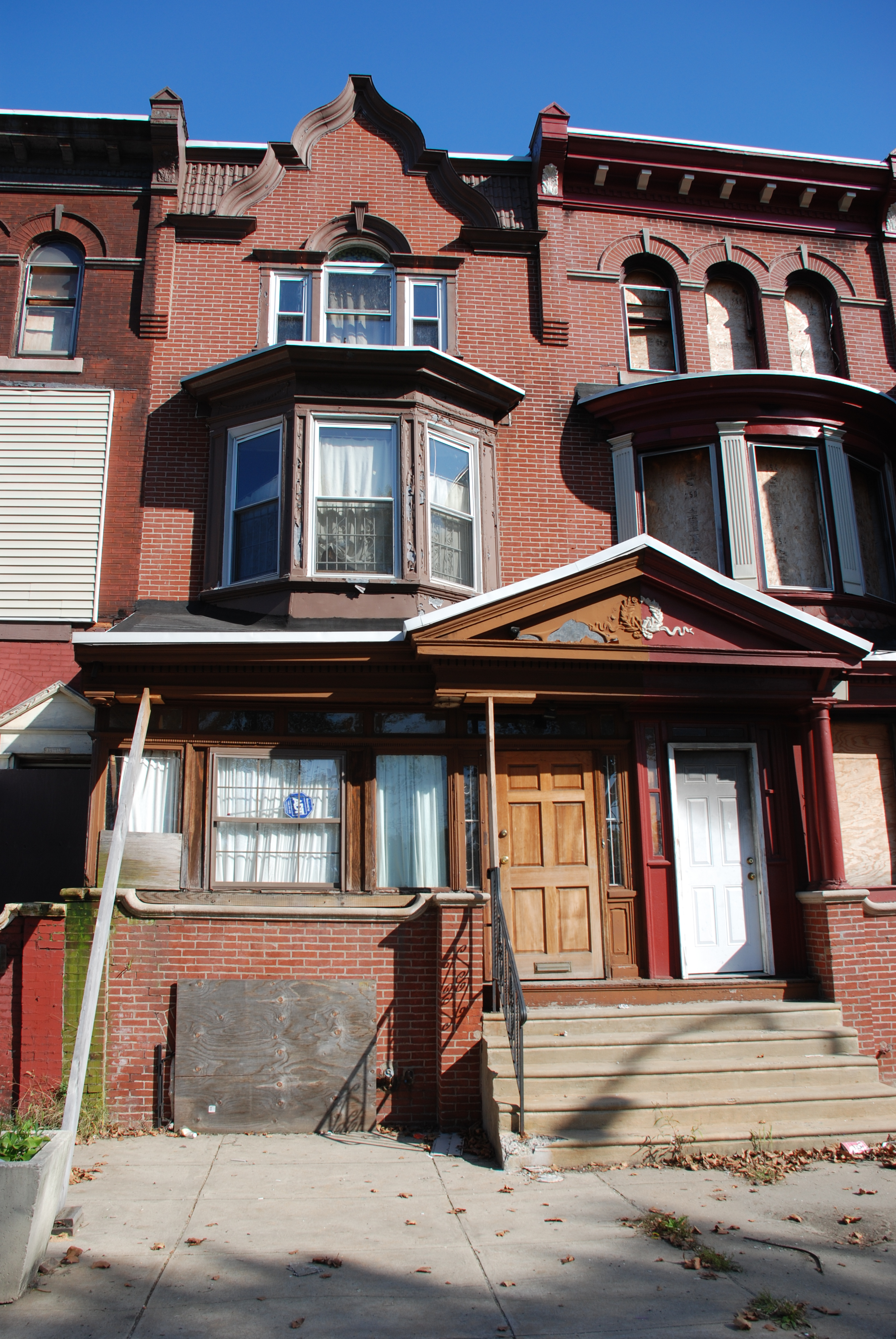
The John Coltrane House in 2009

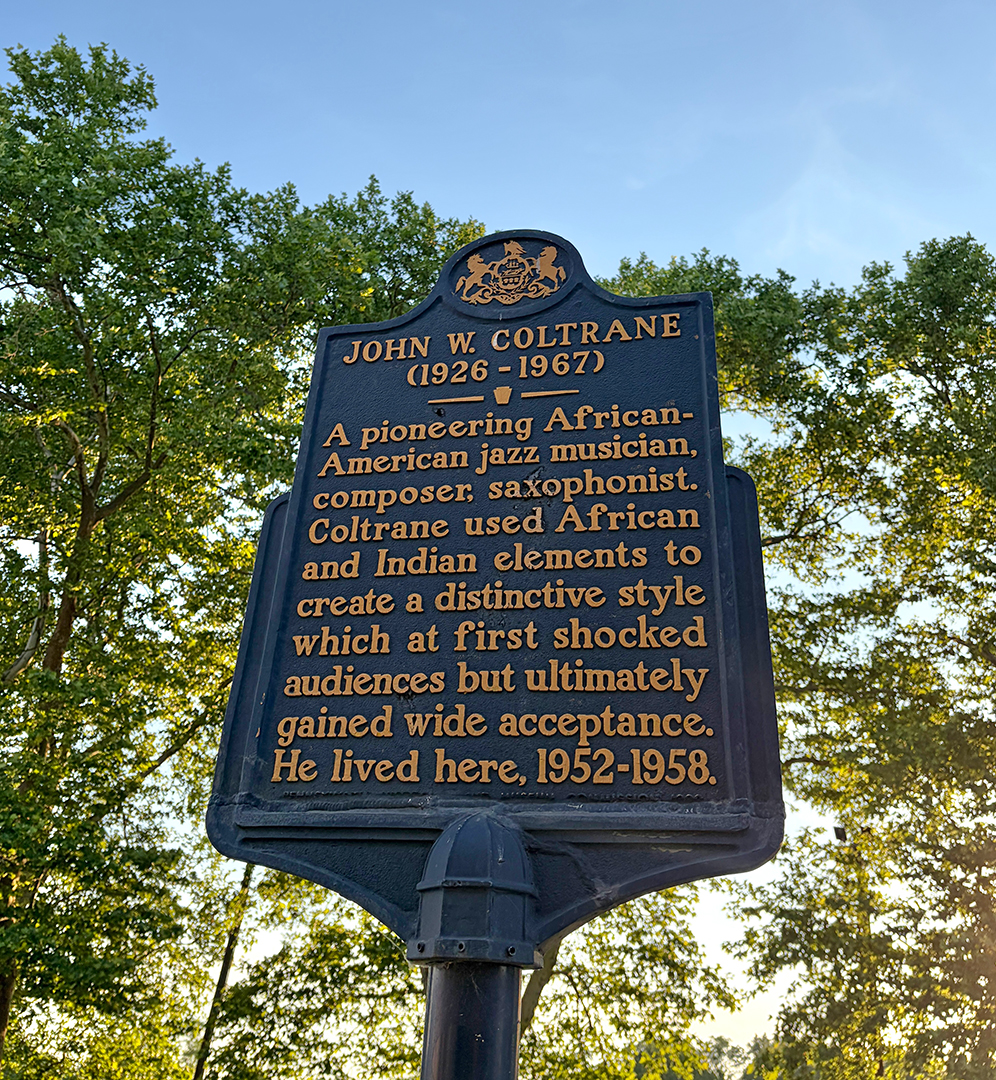
The historical marker for the John Coltrane House

Due to its association with John Coltrane, the house has attracted several official designations as a historic building, most prominently as a National Historic Landmark. It was placed on the Philadelphia Register of Historic Places on December 18, 1985. It was later declared a National Historic Landmark on January 20, 1999, and concurrently placed on the National Register of Historic Places. Additionally, the Pennsylvania Historical & Museum Commission dedicated a marker honoring John Coltrane in front of the house on July 17, 1990.

== See also ==
- List of National Historic Landmarks in Philadelphia
- National Register of Historic Places listings in North Philadelphia
