= Moon Child (Pharoah Sanders album) =

Studio album by Pharoah Sanders
- Released: 1990
- Recorded: October 12 & 23, 1989
- Studio: Studio Davout, Paris, France
- Genre: Jazz
- Length: 52:23
- Label: Timeless SJP 326
- Producer: Wim Wigt

Pharoah Sanders chronology
| A Prayer Before Dawn (1987) | Moon Child (1990) | Welcome to Love (1990) |

Moon Child is an album led by saxophonist Pharoah Sanders recorded in 1989 and released on the Dutch Timeless label.

== Reception ==
Professional ratings
Review scores
| Source | Rating |
|---|---|
| AllMusic | 4/5 stars |
| The Penguin Guide to Jazz Recordings | 3/4 stars |
| The Virgin Encyclopedia of Jazz | 3/5 stars |

In his review for AllMusic, Steve Loewy commented: "The results may have originally disappointed some of Sanders' fans, but with time the saxophonist clearly reinvented himself as a more traditional improviser capable of thoughtful and pensive deliberations".

The authors of The Penguin Guide to Jazz Recordings called Moon Child "the straightest jazz album [Sanders had] made for years," and noted: "you can readily hear the kind of thing Sanders is after, a hypnotic groove that allows the horn to float almost at will."

== Track listing ==
1. "Moon Child" (Pharoah Sanders) - 8:10
2. "Moon Rays" (Horace Silver) - 6:15
3. "The Night Has a Thousand Eyes" (Buddy Bernier, Jerry Brainin) - 12:19
4. "All or Nothing at All" (Arthur Altman, Jack Lawrence) - 9:25
5. "Soon" (George Gershwin, Ira Gershwin) - 5:31
6. "Moniebah" (Abdullah Ibrahim) - 10:43

== Personnel ==
- Pharoah Sanders - tenor saxophone, soprano saxophone
- William Henderson - piano
- Stafford James - bass
- Eddie Moore - drums
- Cheikh Tidiane Fall - percussion
