= A Prayer Before Dawn (album) =

Studio album by Pharoah Sanders
- Released: 1987
- Recorded: September 1987
- Studio: Hyde Street, San Francisco, CA
- Genre: Jazz
- Length: 55:43
- Label: Theresa TR 127

Pharoah Sanders chronology
Oh Lord, Let Me Do No Wrong (1987)	A Prayer Before Dawn (1987)	Moon Child (1990)

A Prayer Before Dawn is an album led by saxophonist Pharoah Sanders, recorded in 1987 and released on the Theresa label that year.

== Reception ==
Professional ratings
Review scores
Source	Rating
AllMusic	3/5 stars
The Penguin Guide to Jazz Recordings	3/4 stars
The Rolling Stone Jazz & Blues Album Guide	3/5 stars

In his review for AllMusic, Al Campbell commented: "A Prayer Before Dawn is one of Pharoah Sanders' gentle, reflective dates. ...It is the opposite of Sanders' characteristic fire-breathing tenor of his Impulse days, but there is nobility in taking this tranquil direction; Sanders refuses to repeat himself. He demands you listen with open ears, dropping preconceived notions."

Writing in the Chicago Tribune, Jack Fuller wrote: "There is a sweetness about some of the cuts on this 1987 recording by tenor saxophonist Pharoah Sanders that becomes almost cloying at times. ...like Archie Shepp and so many other fine jazz exponents from earlier times, he has returned to the basics".

The authors of The Penguin Guide to Jazz wrote: "The cover of A Prayer Before Dawn shows the middle-aged Sanders with white fringe beard and anomalously black hair framing a benevolently owlish expression far removed from the contorted scowl of former years. With accommodation has come productivity, a steady string of unscary and mostly very palatable records. The sound is drier and less physical... but very effective on its own terms. Coltrane cover: 'After the Rain' again - torrential, fresh, brand-new".

== Track listing ==
All compositions by Pharoah Sanders except as indicated

1. "The Light at the Edge of the World" (Piero Piccioni) - 5:08
2. "Dedication to James W. Clark" - 5:15
3. "Softly for Shyla" (William Henderson) - 5:21
4. "The Greatest Love of All" (Linda Creed, Michael Masser) - 8:23
5. "Midnight at Yoshi's" - 5:57
6. "Living Space" (John Coltrane) - 4:32
7. "After the Rain" (Coltrane) - 6:34
8. "In Your Own Sweet Way" (Dave Brubeck) - 7:08 Bonus track on CD reissue
9. "The Christmas Song" (Mel Tormé, Robert Wells) - 7:25 Bonus track on CD reissue

== Personnel ==
- Pharoah Sanders - tenor saxophone, miscellaneous instruments
- William Henderson - piano, synthesizer
- John Hicks - piano (track 7)
- Lynn Taussig - sarod, chandrasarang (track 5)
- Alvin Queen - drums (track 5)
