= Pharoah Sanders =

American jazz saxophonist (1940–2022)

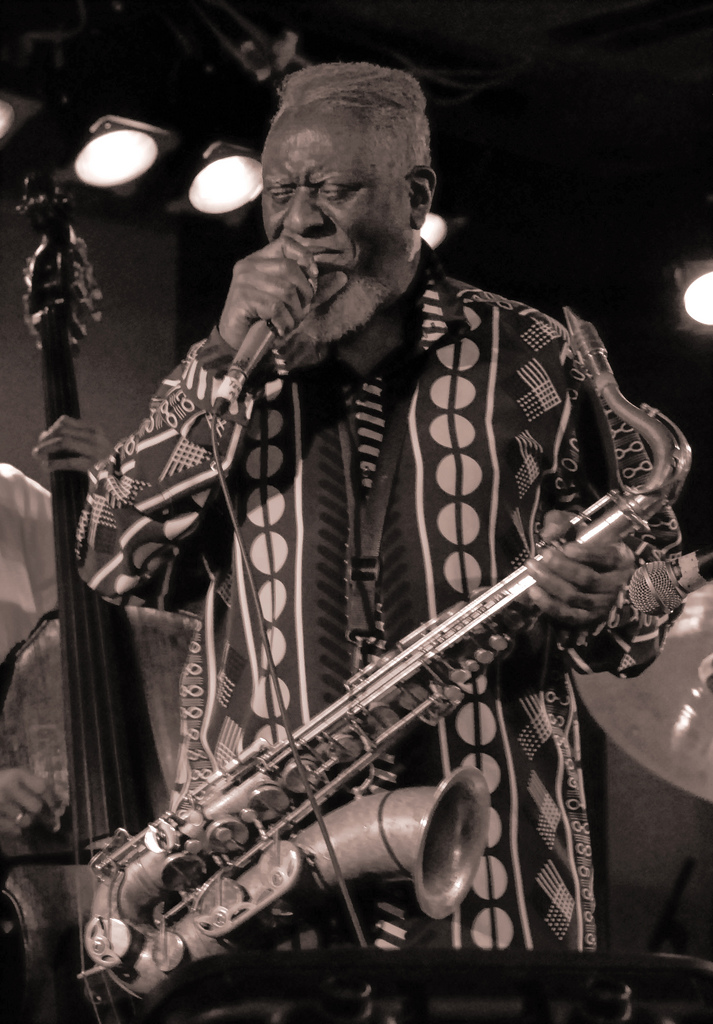
- Sanders in 2006

Background information
- Born: Ferrell Lee Sanders; October 13, 1940; Little Rock, Arkansas, U.S.
- Died: September 24, 2022 (aged 81) Los Angeles, California, U.S.
- Genres: Jazz; spiritual jazz; free jazz; avant-garde jazz; world fusion; ethno jazz; post-bop
- Occupations: Musician; composer; bandleader
- Instruments: Tenor saxophone; soprano saxophone; flute; piccolo; bass clarinet
- Years active: 1964–2022
- Labels: ESP-Disk; Douglas; Theresa; Impulse!; Strata East; Luaka Bop

Pharoah Sanders (born Ferrell Lee Sanders; October 13, 1940 – September 24, 2022) was an American jazz saxophonist. Known for his overblowing, harmonic, and multiphonic techniques on the saxophone, as well as his use of "sheets of sound", Sanders played a prominent role in the development of free jazz and spiritual jazz through his work as a member of John Coltrane's groups in the mid-1960s, and later through his solo work. He released more than thirty albums as a leader and collaborated extensively with vocalist Leon Thomas and pianist Alice Coltrane, among many others. Fellow saxophonist Ornette Coleman once described him as "probably the best tenor player in the world".

Sanders' take on spiritual jazz was rooted in his inspiration from religious concepts such as karma and tawhid, and his rich, meditative performance aesthetic. This style was seen as a continuation of Coltrane's work on albums such as A Love Supreme. As a result, Sanders was considered to have been a disciple of Coltrane or, as Albert Ayler said, "Trane was the Father, Pharoah was the Son, I am the Holy Ghost".

== Early life ==
Pharoah Sanders was born on October 13, 1940, in Little Rock, Arkansas. His mother worked as a cook in a school cafeteria, and his father worked for the City of Little Rock. An only child, Sanders began his musical career accompanying church hymns on clarinet. His initial artistic accomplishments were in the visual arts, but when he was at Scipio Jones High School in North Little Rock, Sanders began playing the tenor saxophone.

After graduating from high school in 1959, Sanders moved to Oakland, California, where he lived with relatives. He briefly studied art and music at Oakland City College. He earned a Bachelor of Fine Arts from an unknown art institution.

== Career ==
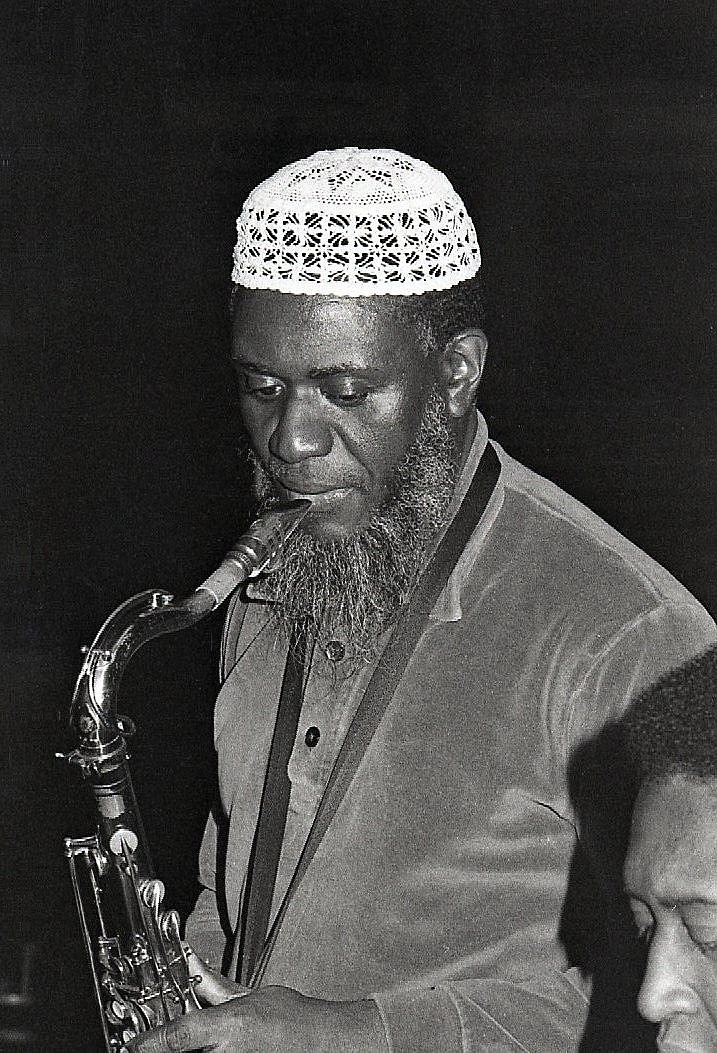
Pharoah Sanders in 1981

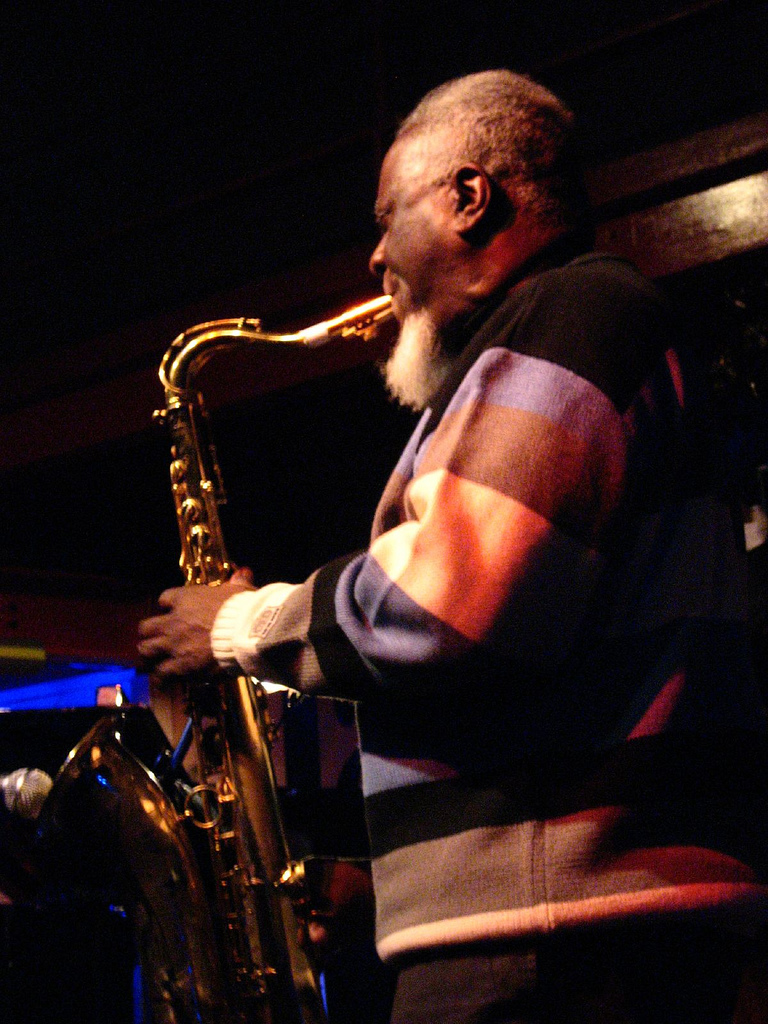
Sanders performing at The Jazz Cafe in London, England, 2008

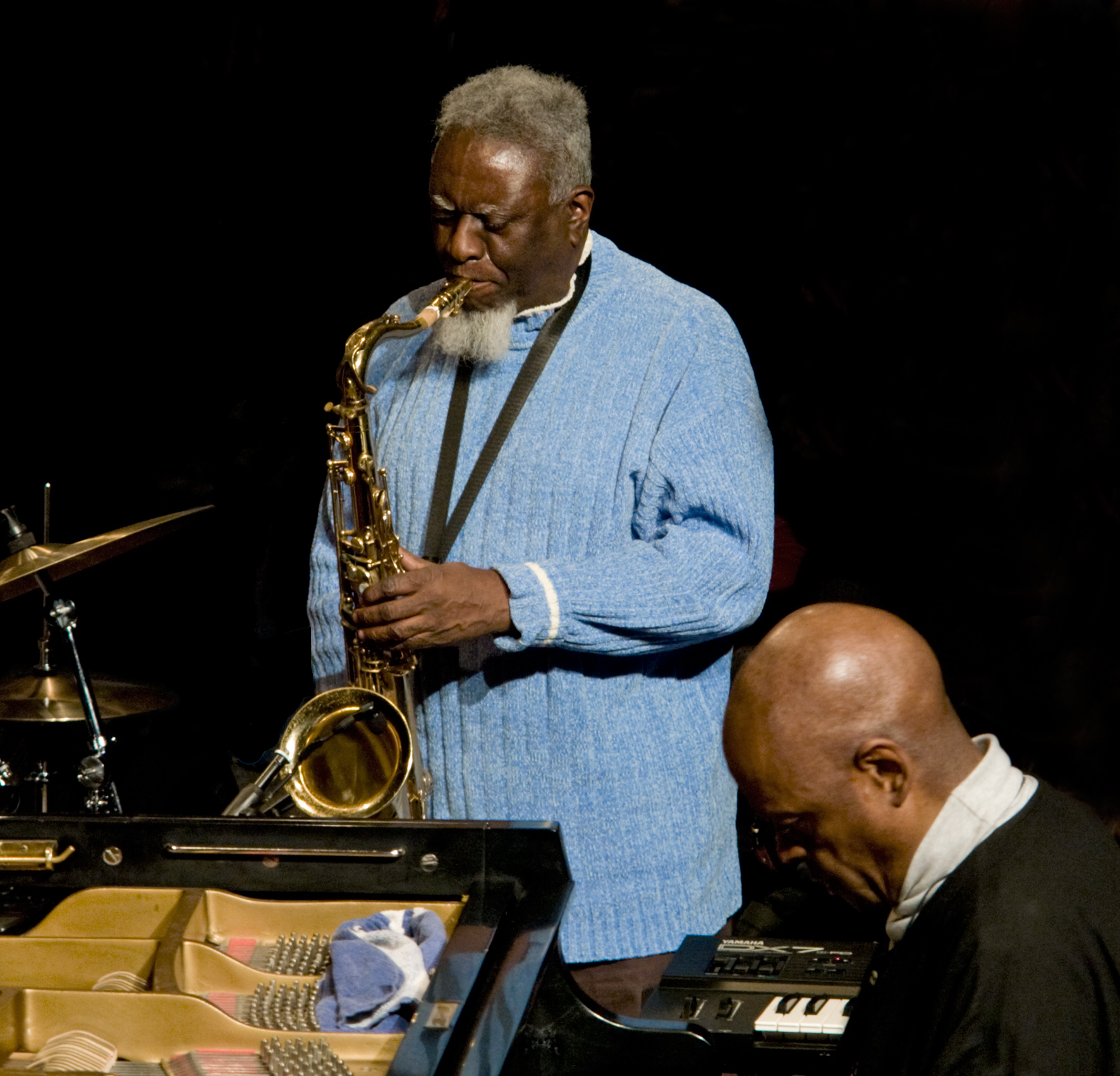
Sanders with William Henderson in 2008

=== 1960s ===
Pharoah Sanders began his professional career playing tenor saxophone in Oakland, then moved to New York City in 1962. Sun Ra's biographer wrote that Sanders was often homeless and Ra gave him a place to live, clothes, and encouraged him to use the name "Pharoah". According to Sanders himself, his grandmother had wanted to name him after the pharaohs in the Bible but chose "Ferrell" instead. Sanders chose "Pharoah" as an artist name upon joining the New York musicians' union. Initially it was sometimes misspelled as "pharaoh".

By 1963, he was playing with musicians such as Billy Higgins and Don Cherry and had caught the attention of Eric Dolphy and John Coltrane. In 1965, he became a member of Coltrane's band, as the latter gravitated towards the avant-garde jazz of Albert Ayler, Sun Ra, and Cecil Taylor. Sanders first recorded with Coltrane on Ascension (recorded in June 1965), then on their dual-tenor album Meditations (recorded in November 1965). After this, Sanders joined Coltrane's final quintet, usually playing long, dissonant solos. Coltrane's later style was influenced by Sanders.

Although Sanders' musical voice developed differently from John Coltrane's, Sanders was influenced by their collaboration. Spiritual elements, such as the chanting in Om, would later show up in many of Sanders' own works. Sanders would also go on to produce much free jazz, modified from Coltrane's solo-centric conception. In 1968, he participated in Michael Mantler and Carla Bley's Jazz Composer's Orchestra Association album The Jazz Composer's Orchestra, featuring Cecil Taylor, Don Cherry, Larry Coryell, and Gato Barbieri.

Pharoah's first album, Pharoah's First, was not what he expected. The musicians playing with him were much more straightforward than Sanders, which made their respective solos a bit out of place. Starting in 1966, Sanders signed with Impulse! and recorded Tauhid, released the following year. The years Sanders spent with the label were both a commercial and critical success.

=== 1970s and 1980s ===
In the 1970s, Sanders continued to produce his own recordings and also continued to work with Alice Coltrane on Journey in Satchidananda. Most of Sanders' best-selling work was made in the late 1960s and early 1970s for Impulse!. Notably including the 30-minute, wave-on-wave "The Creator Has a Master Plan" from the spiritual free-jazz album Karma. This composition featured vocalist Leon Thomas's unique, "umbo weti" yodeling, and Sanders' key musical partner, pianist Lonnie Liston Smith, who worked with Sanders from 1969 to 1971. Other members of his groups in this period include bassist Cecil McBee, on albums such as Jewels of Thought, Izipho Zam, Deaf Dumb Blind, and Thembi.

Although supported by African-American radio, Sanders' brand of brave free jazz became less popular. From the experiments with African rhythms on the 1971 album Black Unity (with bassist Stanley Clarke) onwards he began to diversify his sound. In the late 1970s and 1980s, Sanders explored different musical modes including R&B (Love Will Find a Way), modal jazz, and hard bop. Sanders left Impulse! in 1973 and explored various other labels, such as Theresa in 1980, which was sold to Evidence in 1991.

=== 1990s ===
A 1979 recording titled Ed Kelly and Friend, which Sanders completed for Theresa Records was reissued in 1992 under Evidence (Ed Kelly and Pharoah Sanders). The 1992 reissue contained extra tracks which featured Pharoah's pupil Robert Stewart. In 1994, Sanders traveled to Morocco to record the Bill Laswell-produced album The Trance Of Seven Colors with Gnawa musician Mahmoud Guinia. That same year, he appeared on the Red Hot Organization album Stolen Moments: Red Hot + Cool with the track "This is Madness" with Umar Bin Hassan and Abiodun Oyewole and with the bonus track "The Creator Has A Master Plan (Trip Hop Remix)." The album was named "Album of the Year" by Time. He also collaborated with drummer–composer Franklin Kiermyer on Kiermyer's album Solomon's Daughter, which was also released on the Evidence label (re-released with 3 previously unreleased tracks on the Dot Time label in 2019).

Sanders' major-label return came in 1995 with Message from Home under Verve Records. This was followed by Save Our Children (1998). In both, Sanders worked with Laswell, Jah Wobble, and others. Again, however. Sanders' distaste with the recording business prompted him to leave the label. In 1997 he was featured on several Tisziji Muñoz albums which include Rashied Ali. In 1999, in an interview, he mentioned his trouble finding work, despite his artistic pedigree.

=== 2000s and 2020s ===
In the 2000s, a resurgence of interest in jazz kept Sanders playing concerts, releasing albums and playing festivals, including the 2004 Bluesfest Byron Bay, the 2007 Melbourne Jazz Festival, and the 2008 Big Chill Festival. In 2000, Sanders released Spirits. In 2003, he recorded with the Japanese band Sleep Walker (he has a strong following in Japan). That same year, he released a live album titled The Creator Has a Master Plan (not to be confused with the song). He was awarded a National Endowment for the Arts Jazz Masters Fellowship in 2016 and was honored at a tribute concert in Washington DC on April 4, 2016.

In 2020, Sanders recorded an album titled Promises, with the English electronic music producer Floating Points and the London Symphony Orchestra. It was released in March 2021, the first major new album by Sanders in nearly two decades. It was widely acclaimed, with Pitchfork declaring it "a clear late-career masterpiece". Promises was the last album Sanders released before his death.

=== Death ===
Sanders died on September 24, 2022, at his home in Los Angeles, at the age of 81. It was disclosed publicly by Luaka Bop. A cause of death was not specified.

== Discography ==
=== As leader ===
Overview of Pharoah Sanders albums
Title	Year Recorded	Year Released	Label
Pharoah's First (also released as Pharoah and Pharoah Sanders Quintet)	1964	1965	ESP-Disk
Tauhid	1966	1967	Impulse!
Karma	1969	1969	Impulse!
Jewels of Thought	1969	1969	Impulse!
Deaf Dumb Blind (Summun Bukmun Umyun)	1970	1970	Impulse!
Thembi	1970–1971	1971	Impulse!
Black Unity	1971	1971	Impulse!
Live at the East	1971	1972	Impulse!
Wisdom Through Music	1972	1973	Impulse!
Izipho Zam (My Gifts)	1969	1973	Strata-East
Village of the Pharoahs	1971–1973	1973	Impulse!
Love in Us All	1972-73	1974	Impulse!
Elevation	1973	1974	Impulse!
Pharoah	1976	1977	India Navigation
Love Will Find a Way	1977	1977	Arista
Journey to the One	1979	1980	Theresa
Beyond a Dream	1978	1981	Arista
Rejoice	1981	1981	Theresa
Pharoah Sanders Live...	1981	1982	Theresa
Heart Is a Melody	1982	1983	Theresa
Shukuru	1981	1985	Theresa
Africa	1987	1987	Timeless
Oh Lord, Let Me Do No Wrong	1987	1987	Doctor Jazz
A Prayer Before Dawn	1987	1987	Theresa
Moon Child	1989	1989	Timeless
Welcome to Love	1990	1991	Timeless
Crescent with Love	1992	1993	Venus; Evidence
Ballads with Love (compilation / reissue)	1992	1994	Venus
Message from Home	1996	1996	Verve
Save Our Children	1997	1998	Verve
Spirits	1998	2000	Meta
The Creator Has a Master Plan	2003	2003	Venus
With a Heartbeat	2003	2003	Evolver Records
Promises	2019-20	2021	Luaka Bop
In the Beginning 1963-1964 (4 CD compilation)	1963–1964	2012	ESP-Disk
Live at Antibes Jazz Festival Juan-Les-Pins July 21, 1968 (Unofficial / bootleg)	1968	2019	Alternative Fox
Live in Paris (1975) (Lost ORTF Recordings)	1975	2020	Transversales Disques
Live At Fabrik Hamburg 1980	1980	2023	Jazzline
Oyster Club, Nice, France Fm 18/07/1971 (Unofficial / bootleg)	1971	2023	WHP

=== As sideman ===
with John Coltrane
Ascension (Impulse!, 1965)
Live In Seattle (Impulse!, 1965)
Om (Impulse!, 1965)
A Love Supreme: Live in Seattle (Impulse!, 1965)
Kulu Sé Mama (Impulse!, 1965)
Selflessness: Featuring My Favorite Things (Impulse!, 1965)
Meditations (Impulse!, 1965)
Live at the Village Vanguard Again! (Impulse!, 1966)
Live In Japan (Impulse!, 1966)
Offering: Live at Temple University (Impulse!, 1966)
Expression (Impulse!, 1967)
The Olatunji Concert: The Last Live Recording (Impulse!, 1967)
Infinity (Impulse!, 1972)

with Don Cherry
Symphony for Improvisers (Blue Note, 1966)
Where Is Brooklyn? (Blue Note, 1967)

with Alice Coltrane
Cosmic Music (Impulse!, 1968)
A Monastic Trio (Impulse!, 1968)
Ptah, the El Daoud (Impulse!, 1970)
Journey in Satchidananda (Impulse!, 1970)
Carnegie Hall '71 (Hi Hat, 2018)
The Carnegie Hall Concert (Impulse!, 2024)

with Kenny Garrett
Beyond the Wall (Nonesuch, 2006)
Sketches of MD: Live at the Iridium (Mack Avenue, 2008)

with Norman Connors
Romantic Journey (Buddah 1977)
This Is Your Life (Buddah 1978)
Remember Who You Are (MoJazz 1993)

with Tisziji Muñoz
Visiting This Planet (Anami Music, 1980's)
River of Blood (Anami Music, 1997)
Present Without a Trace (Anami Music, 1980's)
Spirit World (Anami Music, 1997)
Divine Radiance (Dreyfus/Anami Music, 2003)
Divine Radiance Live! (Anami Music, 2013)
Mountain Peak (Anami Music, 2014)

with McCoy Tyner
Love & Peace (Trio 1982)
Blues for Coltrane: A Tribute to John Coltrane (Impulse!, 1987)

with Randy Weston
The Spirits of Our Ancestors (Verve 1992)
Khepera (Verve 1998)

with others
1964 – Sun Ra – Featuring Pharoah Sanders & Black Harold
1965 – Ornette Coleman – Chappaqua Suite (Columbia)
1968 – Michael Mantler – Jazz Composer's Orchestra – The Jazz Composer's Orchestra (JCOA)
1968 – Gary Bartz – Another Earth (Milestone)
1969 – Leon Thomas – Spirits Known and Unknown (Flying Dutchman)
1971 – The Latin Jazz Quintet – Oh! Pharoah Speak (Trip) reissued in 1973 as Spotlight on Pharoah Sanders with the Latin Jazz Quintet
1973 – Larry Young – Lawrence of Newark (Perception)
1979 – Ed Kelly – Ed Kelly & Friend (Theresa Records)
1979 – Hilton Ruiz – Fantasia (Denon)
1980 – Idris Muhammad – Kabsha (Theresa)
1984 – Benny Golson – This Is for You, John (Baystate)
1985 – Art Davis – Life (Soul Note)
1991 – Sonny Sharrock – Ask the Ages (Axiom)
1992 – Ed Kelly – Ed Kelly and Pharoah Sanders (Evidence Records) with Robert Stewart (saxophonist)
1992 – New York Unit – Over the Rainbow (Paddle Wheel)
1994 – Franklin Kiermyer – Solomon's Daughter
1994 – Bheki Mseleku – Timelessness (Verve)
1994 – Maleem Mahmoud Ghania – The Trance of Seven Colors (Axiom)
1995 – Aïyb Dieng – Rhythmagick
1996 – Jah Wobble – Heaven & Earth (Island)
1997 – Wallace Roney – Village (Warner Bros.)
1997 – Music Revelation Ensemble – Cross Fire (DIW)
1998 – Terry Callier – Time Peace (Verve)
2000 – Alex Blake – Now Is the Time: Live at the Knitting Factory
2000 – Kahil El'Zabar's Ritual Trio – Africa N'Da Blues (Delmark)
2001 – Gigi - Gigi (Guramayle)
2004 – David Murray – Gwotet (Justin Time)
2005 – Will Calhoun – Native Lands
2008 – Sleep Walker – Into the Sun (in The Voyage)
2014 – Chicago Underground/São Paulo Underground – Spiral Mercury
2019 – Joey DeFrancesco – In the Key of the Universe
2021 – Floating Points and the London Symphony Orchestra – Promises
