= Spiritual jazz =

Sub-genre of jazz

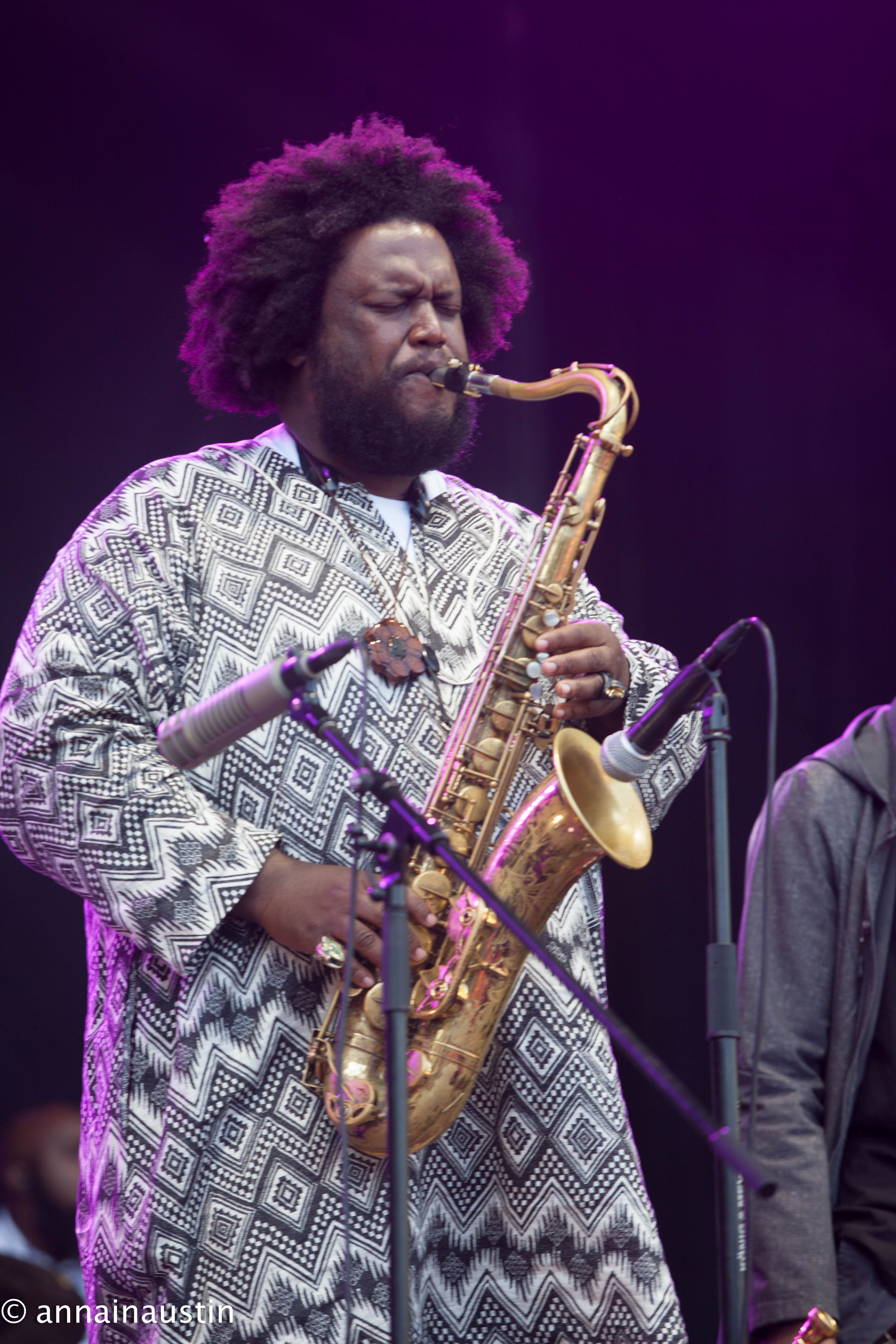
- Contemporary spiritual jazz musician Kamasi Washington performing
- Stylistic origins: Jazz; post-bop; modal jazz; free jazz; folk; experimental
- Cultural origins: Civil rights movement; transcendence; spirituality

Other topics
- Free jazz; avant-garde jazz; free improvisation

Spiritual jazz is a sub-genre of jazz that originated in the United States during the 1960s. The genre is hard to characterize musically but draws from free, avant-garde and modal jazz and thematically focuses on transcendence and spirituality. John Coltrane's 1965 album A Love Supreme is considered a landmark in the genre.

== Characteristics ==
Spiritual jazz does not follow a strictly defined musical style but generally features elements of free jazz, avant-garde jazz and modal jazz with influences from Asian and African music. Quartal harmonies, the Dorian mode, meditative sounds as well as the musical language of blues and bebop are often employed in spiritual jazz. Musicians frequently play instruments not traditionally used in jazz or western music, electric keyboards and utilise the recording studio as an instrument.

== History ==
=== Origins ===
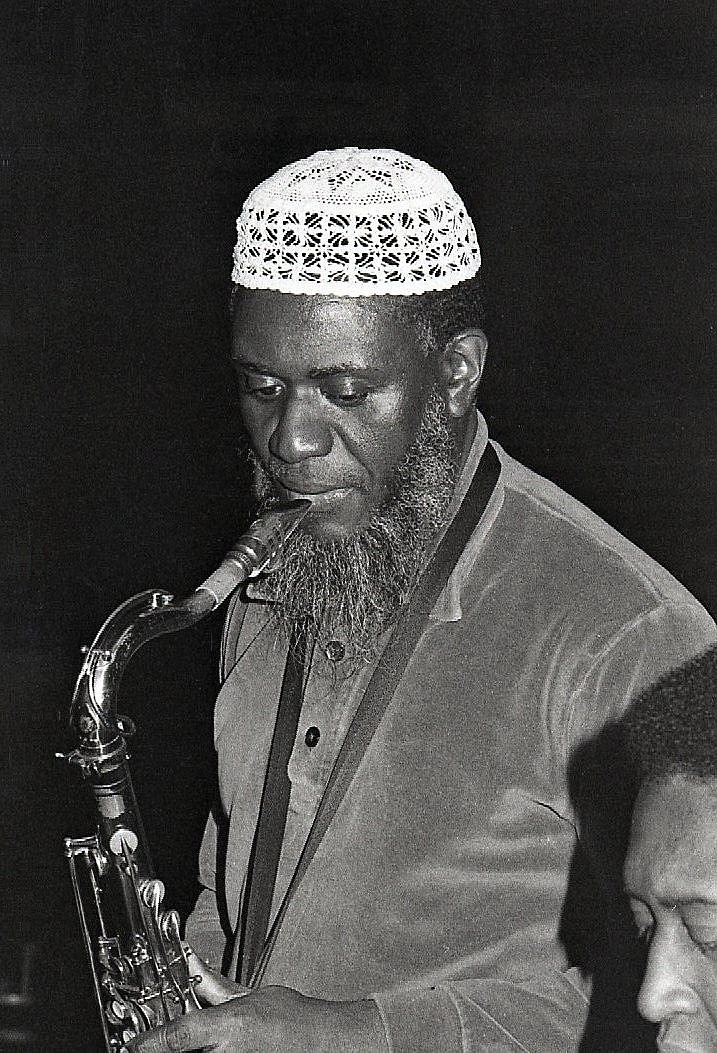
Pharoah Sanders in 1981.

Critics usually associate spiritual jazz with the 1960s but the beginnings of the genre can be traced to the sacred jazz and similar works of the 1940s and 1950s such as Black, Brown and Beige by Duke Ellington, Zodiac Suite by Mary Lou Williams, and Jazz at the Vespers by George Lewis.

During the 1960s in the United States, the civil rights movement was occurring, causing societal change and political movements. As a result, African-American people gained more freedom to celebrate their culture and to express themselves religiously. This led to a desire to push the conventions of jazz, with some artists choosing to search for transcendence and spirituality in their music.

John Coltrane's 1965 album A Love Supreme is generally considered the genesis of spiritual jazz though Coltrane can be heard developing the sound on the song "Spiritual" recorded four years earlier. Treblezine wrote "Spiritual jazz begins, essentially, with John Coltrane," while Pitchfork wrote "This musical exploration [of spirituality] was epitomized by tenor saxophonist John Coltrane". A Love Supreme and other works by John Coltrane inspired other jazz musicians to create music searching for transcendence. For example, Pharoah Sanders and Don Cherry were considered to have taken inspiration from Coltrane's spiritual works.

After John Coltrane's death in 1967, his wife Alice Coltrane and Sanders—both who had previously played with Coltrane—were some of the first to continue the sound of the genre. Coltrane's 1971 album Journey in Satchidananda combined spiritual jazz with influences from Hindustani classical music, after her journey into spirituality with help from Swami Satchidananda. Journey in Satchidananda used ragas, harps, sitars, and ouds to achieve its sound. Pharoah Sanders took inspiration from Arabic, Indian, and Afro-Cuban music to create early spiritual jazz albums, including Tauhid (1967) and Karma (1969).

=== Continuations ===
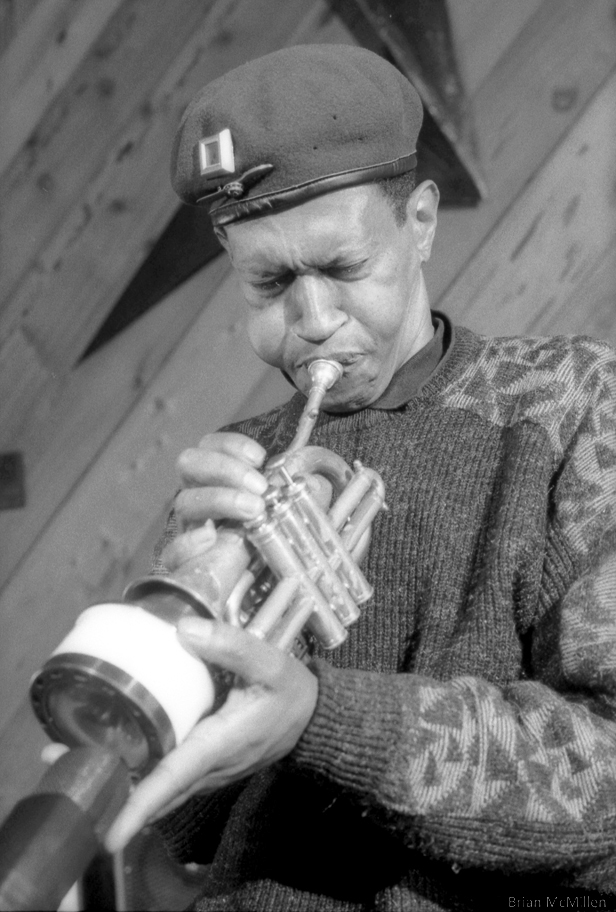
Don Cherry in 1989

Many artists other than Alice Coltrane and Pharoah Sanders were inspired by John Coltrane's spiritual jazz works. Prevalent artists of this era of spiritual jazz included Lonnie Liston Smith, Albert Ayler, Sun Ra, and Don Cherry. Saxophonist Albert Ayler was a student of John Coltrane, known for his "uncanny, visceral, and startlingly new" take on jazz tradition and his use of spirituals, as seen in 1969's Music is the Healing Force of the Universe. Electric keyboardist Lonnie Liston Smith, inspired by his work with Pharaoh Sanders, released his debut album Astral Traveling in 1973. According to Brian Zimmerman, "While [Astral Traveling] does tap into that spiritual element, it's got a "poppier" vein running through it."

Bandleader Sun Ra's spiritual jazz was influenced by Egyptology and went on to inspire Afrofuturism. According to Jazziz, Space Is the Place (1973) is one of Ra's "most famous albums". Saxophonist Azar Lawrence—described as a "Coltrane devotee" by KCRW—released Bridge into the New Age in 1974. The album has been influential on young jazz musicians in London, as recent as the 2020s.

=== Contemporary ===
Spiritual jazz was primarily present during the 1960s and 1970s, although the genre is still currently created to a lesser extent. One of the most lauded examples of the continuation of this lineage is Franklin Kiermyer’s 1994 album Solomon's Daughter featuring Pharoah Sanders. Kiermyer has continued on this path. Examples of spiritual jazz albums from the 2010s and 2020s include The Epic by Kamasi Washington (2015), Wisdom of Elders by Shabaka & The Ancestors (2016), There is a Place by Maisha (2019), Reverence by Muriel Grossman (2019), and Cosmic Transitions by Isaiah Collier & The Chosen Few (2021). According to Treblezine, "Kamasi Washington brought spiritual jazz back to popular consciousness on a wider scale in 2015 with the release of [The Epic]". KCRW wrote: "Washington is attracting many young enthusiasts to the jazz scene."

== Further information ==
- Freeman, Philip (2021). Ugly beauty : jazz in the 21st century. Winchester, UK. ISBN 978-1-78904-633-5. OCLC 1295440043.
- "History of Spiritual Jazz: Part 1". Black Classical. September 3, 2016. NTS Radio.
