= Featuring Pharoah Sanders & Black Harold =

Live album by Sun Ra
- Released: 1976
- Recorded: December 31, 1964
- Genre: Jazz, avant-garde jazz, free jazz
- Label: Saturn; ESP Disk (extended reissue); Superior Viaduct (extended reissue)

Sun Ra chronology
Live at Montreux (1976)	Featuring Pharoah Sanders & Black Harold (1976)	Visions (1978)

Featuring Pharoah Sanders and Black Harold is a jazz album by Sun Ra, recorded live on December 31, 1964, but not released until 1976, on Ra and Alton Abraham's El Saturn label. An expanded version of the album was reissued in 2009 by ESP-Disk, and again in 2017 by Superior Viaduct. A complete version of Sun Ra's performances on December 30 and 31, 1964 were released in 2012 on the Pharoah Sanders album In The Beginning 1963-1964.

The jacket of the original release of the album stated that the recording took place on June 15, 1964 at the Cellar Cafe, New York, prior to the "October Revolution in Jazz". However, it has been established that the recording actually took place at Judson Hall on December 31, as part of the Jazz Composers Guild's "Four Days in December" series of concerts. The reissues on ESP-Disk and Superior Viaduct provide the correct location and date, as do the liner notes for In The Beginning 1963-1964, as well as the discography found in John Szwed's biography of Sun Ra.

The record documents the earliest known recorded performance of "The Shadow World" (here reverse-named as "The World Shadow"), a complex structured piece which was to feature on several of Ra's better known records of subsequent years, notably The Magic City.

It is an unusual item in the Ra discography, because tenor saxophonist Pharoah Sanders replaces John Gilmore, a mainstay of the Arkestra for most of its existence; at the time, he was working in other contexts, with the pianists Paul Bley and Andrew Hill, and drummer Art Blakey. Before releasing the recording, Sun Ra said "It should be very interesting to show the world what pre-Coltrane Pharoah Sanders was like"

Also featured is the obscure flautist, Black Harold (Harold Murray), who takes a solo, vocalising through his flute, Rahsaan Roland Kirk-style, on "The Voice of Pan" (continuing into "Dawn over Israel").

This is Sanders' only recording with Sun Ra, and he is not a major presence, taking only one solo on the first track. Ra himself plays several short piano solos and introductions. Alan Silva also has a brief bass solo, and alto saxophonist Marshall Allen provides his customary fireworks. The music is mostly in the experimental, free-jazz mould, and though not quite as radical and challenging as "The Magic City", it is mostly dense and uncompromising (though that is not to say there is no variety - there are plenty of quiet interludes as well).

== Reception ==
Professional ratings
Review scores
Source	Rating
Allmusic	4/5 stars

In his AllMusic review, Michael Nastos wrote: "Aside from the historical significance of this disc, the music is terrific and altogether riveting... It's also well recorded and transferred to the digital format faithfully. It's possible that only a few (save the critics in the house) knew a piece of history was in the making during this incredible performance that all Sun Ra fans can easily savor and treasure for lifetimes beyond this mortal coil." Writing in All About Jazz, John Sharpe stated: "this is a seminal historic document and nothing short of essential for Sun Ra aficionados." Raul D'Gama Rose wrote: "Sun Ra featuring Pharoah Sanders & Black Harold is a near mythical document of the astral traveling Arkestra... This is a magnificent introduction to the Arkestra that shortly thereafter embarked on its Heliocentric journey. Sun Ra, together with a select expeditionary force is about, it seems, to undertake a journey on behalf of body and soul and take music into the stratosphere of modern sound."

== Track listing ==
All compositions by Sun Ra.

Original El Saturn release:

1. "Gods on a Safari"
2. "The World Shadow (incl. Rocket Number 9)"
3. "The Voice of Pan"
4. "Dawn over Israel (incl. Space Mates)"

ESP-Disk reissue:

1. "Cosmic Interpretation"
2. "The Other World"
3. "The Second Star Is Jupiter"
4. "The Now Tomorrow"
5. "Discipline 9"
6. "Gods on a Safari"
7. "The World Shadow"
8. "Rocket Number 9"
9. "The Voice of Pan"
10. "Dawn Over Israel"
11. "Space Mates"

== Personnel and Recording details ==
- Pharoah Sanders - tenor sax
- Black Harold - flute
- Sun Ra - Piano, electric celeste
- Al Evans - trumpet, flugelhorn
- Chris Capers - trumpet
- Teddy Nance - trombone
- Bernard Pettaway - trombone
- Robert Northern - French horn
- Marshall Allen - alto sax, flute
- Danny Davis - alto sax, flute
- Robert Cummings - bass clarinet
- Pat Patrick - baritone sax
- Alan Silva - bass, cello
- Clifford Jarvis - drums
- Art Jenkins- space voice
