= Karma (Pharoah Sanders album) =

Studio album by Pharoah Sanders
- Released: May 1969
- Recorded: February 14 & 19, 1969
- Studios: RCA, New York City
- Genres: Avant-garde jazz, spiritual jazz, free jazz
- Length: 37:30
- Label: Impulse!
- Producer: Bob Thiele

Pharoah Sanders chronology
Tauhid (1967)	Karma (1969)	Jewels of Thought (1969)

Professional ratings
Review scores
Source	Rating
AllMusic	5/5 stars
DownBeat	1/5 stars
The Penguin Guide to Jazz Recordings	3/4 stars
Rolling Stone	(favorable)
Uncut	9/10

Karma is a jazz recording by the American tenor saxophonist Pharoah Sanders, released in May 1969 on the Impulse! label, with catalog number AS 9181. A pioneering work of the spiritual jazz style, it has become Sanders' most popular and critically acclaimed album, with Pitchfork ranking it number 53 on its list of the greatest albums of the 1960s.

== Background ==
The social and political upheavals of the 1960s have been cited as a major factor in the emergence of a new stylistic trend in jazz, with a very different emphasis to the forms of the music which emerged earlier. Many of the artists involved in the making of this new music, variously called "free jazz", "the new thing", or "energy music", recorded for the Impulse! label. Ashley Kahn writes that several musicians, often those who had either played with or been influenced by John Coltrane, such as his widow Alice Coltrane, Archie Shepp, Pharoah Sanders, and Leon Thomas, began exploring new thematic and musical ideas, often associated with non-western religious and musical traditions. Although the ideological strain was much more obvious in Shepp's music than Sanders', the musical influence was just as pronounced: virtually all of his recordings as a leader from this late 1960s/early 1970s period contain a variety of African percussion, and other non-western features such as Leon Thomas' distinctive vocal styles.

== Album information ==
Karma is Sanders' third recording as a leader, and is among a number of spiritually themed albums on the Impulse! Records label, released in the late 1960s/early 1970s. Although it is followed by the brief "Colors", the album's main piece is the 32-minute-long "The Creator Has a Master Plan", co-composed by Sanders with vocalist Leon Thomas. Some see this piece as a kind of sequel to Sanders' mentor John Coltrane's legendary 1965 recording A Love Supreme (whose opening it echoes in a muscular yet lyrical opening "prelude", with Sanders playing over a suspended, non-rhythmic backdrop, before the entrance of a bass figure which underpins much of the piece). It features Sanders on tenor sax, along with two of his most important collaborators, the aforementioned Leon Thomas and pianist Lonnie Liston Smith, as well as a supporting cast of musicians who were major musicians in their own right: flautist James Spaulding; French-horn player Julius Watkins; bassist Reggie Workman, who had played with Coltrane earlier in the 1960s; second bassist Richard Davis; drummer Billy Hart, and percussionist Nathaniel Bettis. While later recorded versions of the tune, some of which featured Sanders and Thomas, became shorter and more lyrical, this original contains extended free instrumental sections, particularly the third section, where the saxophonist demonstrates some of the techniques which build his distinctive sound, including a split-reed technique, overblowing, and multiphonics, which give a screeching sound.

On the whole, however, this was quite laid-back and accessible for a free-jazz record (compared to, say, Coltrane's 1966 album Ascension), with its mantra-like chant-melody, accessible, loping groove (which has since been sampled and covered by other artists—Sanders himself re-uses it on "Heart Is a Melody of Time (Hikoro's Song)" from his album Heart is a Melody) and optimistic, spiritual lyrics. The unusual textures also give an impression of the exotic, with the employment of a French horn and flute, adding an almost orchestral tinge not often found in jazz, as well as Leon Thomas' characteristic yodelling and a variety of percussion instruments. Despite its length, it achieved mainstream FM radio airplay, surely the closest the avant-garde movement came to a "hit", apart from the cult classic A Love Supreme, and its popularity with acid jazz and hip hop artists attests to its continuing popular status. The influence of the "spiritual jazz" movement, and Sanders' involvement in particular, can be seen in Sarah Webster Fabio's 1976 lyrics to "Jujus: Alchemy of the Blues":

You prophesied the return of mandolins
and tambourines and tinkling bells,
and triangles and cymbals,
and they sided in on beams from Pharoah Sanders as I slept
taking me unaware, tripping,
blowing my mind.
—Sarah Webster Fabio, 1976

== Legacy; Influence on other Genres ==
Pitchfork ranked Karma number 53 on its list of the greatest albums of the 1960s. Jazzwise listed it as one of the "100 Jazz Albums That Shook The World". The New Yorker put the album on its list of the "100 essential Jazz Albums". In 1984, garage rock-punk blues band the Gun Club released their version of the song "The Creator Has a Master Plan" as the opening track on the second side of their album The Las Vegas Story (album). Brooklyn Funk Essentials covered the song.

== Track listing ==
For the 1995 compact disc reissue, "The Creator Has a Master Plan" was re-edited back to a single track with a running time of 32:46.

Side one
No.	Title	Writer(s)	Length
1.	"The Creator Has a Master Plan" (part one)	Pharoah Sanders, Leon Thomas	19:20

Side two
No.	Title	Writer(s)	Length
1.	"The Creator Has a Master Plan" (part two)	Pharoah Sanders, Leon Thomas	13:36
2.	"Colors"	Pharoah Sanders, Leon Thomas	5:37

== Personnel ==
- Pharoah Sanders — tenor saxophone
- Leon Thomas — vocal, percussion
- Julius Watkins — french horn
- James Spaulding — flute on "The Creator Has a Master Plan"
- Lonnie Liston Smith — piano
- Reggie Workman — bass
- Richard Davis — bass on "The Creator Has a Master Plan"
- Ron Carter — bass on "Colors"
- Billy Hart — drums on "The Creator Has a Master Plan"
- Freddie Waits — drums on "Colors"
- Nathaniel Bettis — percussion on "The Creator Has a Master Plan"
