= John Coltrane Home =

Historic house in New York, United States

- Coltrane House
- U.S. National Register of Historic Places
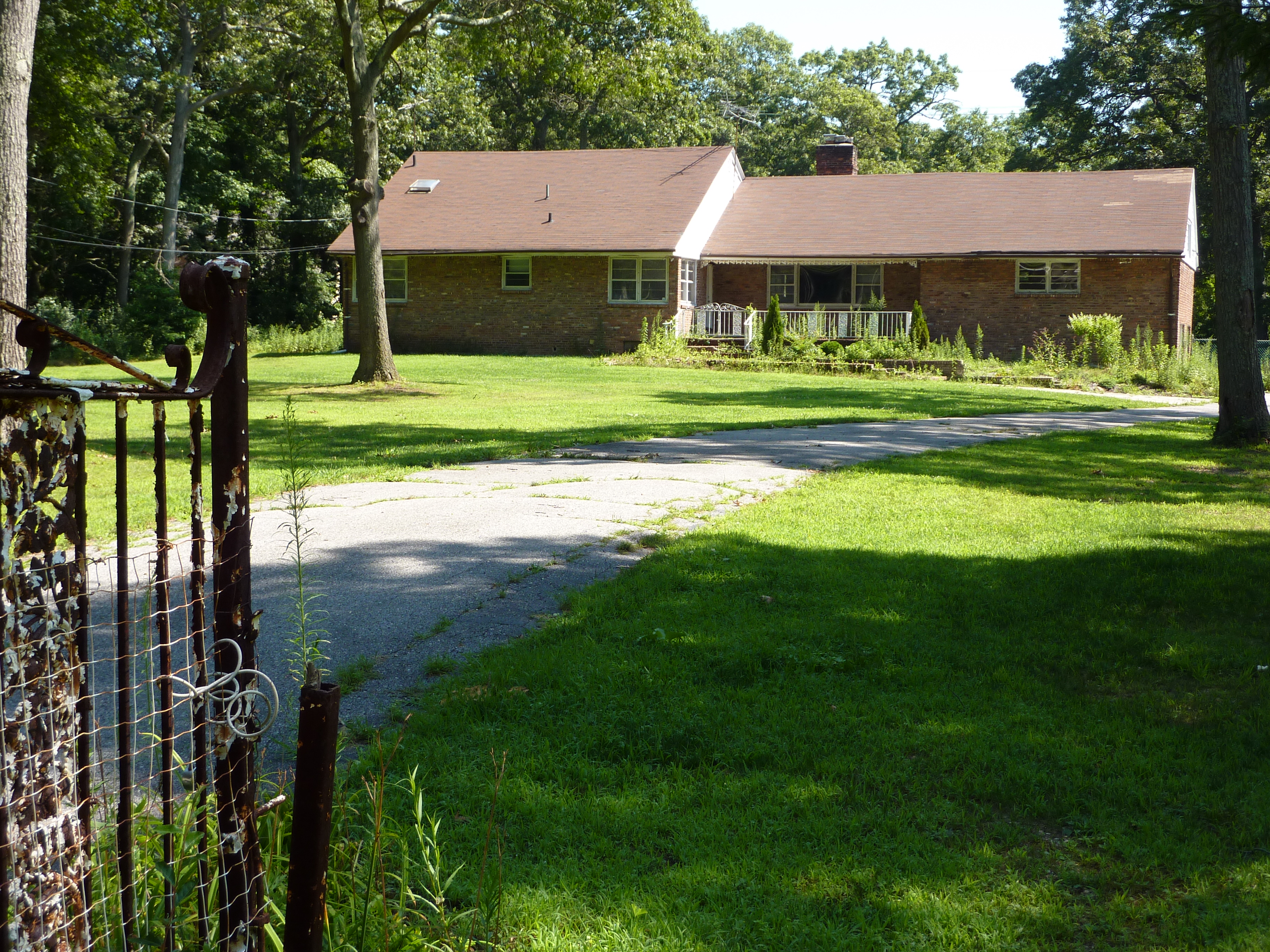
- The house in 2009

- Location within New York Location within the United States
- Location: 247 Candlewood Path, Dix Hills, New York
- Coordinates: 40°47′59.29″N 73°19′27.43″W
- Area: 3.4 acres (1.4 ha)
- Architectural style: Mid 20th Century Ranch
- NRHP reference No.: 07000628
- Added to NRHP: June 29, 2007

The John Coltrane Home is a ranch house in Dix Hills, New York, where jazz saxophonist John Coltrane lived with his family from 1964 until his death in 1967. Coltrane composed his album A Love Supreme, widely considered his magnum opus, in his practice room in the house.

== Background ==
John Coltrane and his wife Alice moved to Suffolk County in 1964, along with their three children and Alice's daughter from her prior marriage to Kenny Hagood. John lived in the house until his death from liver cancer at Huntington Hospital on July 17, 1967; Alice continued living in the house until 1973. The basement of the house was the site of Coltrane Studios, where many of John's demo recordings were made and Alice recorded several of her early solo albums.

== Preservation efforts ==
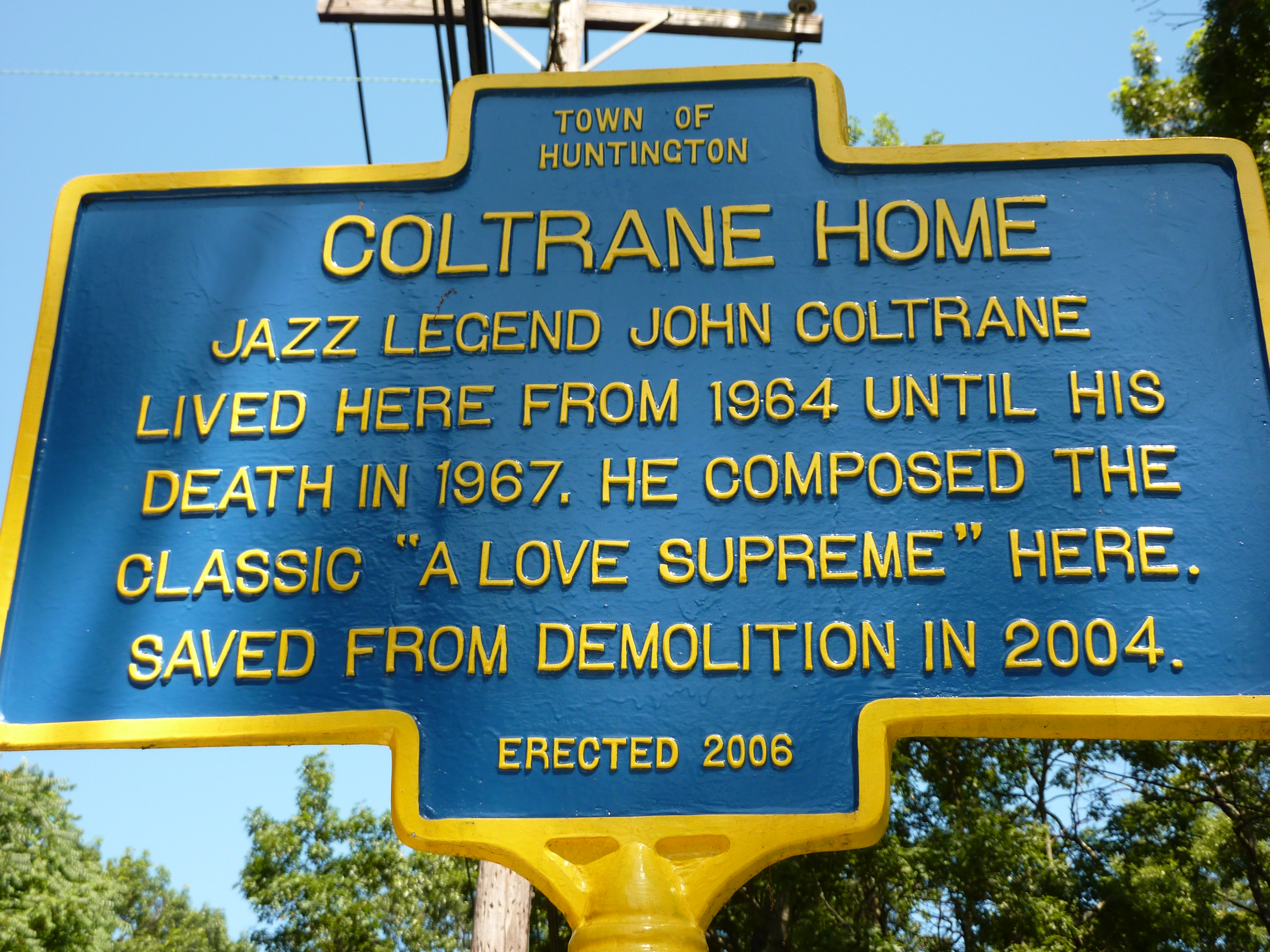
Historic marker in front of the house

In 2002, the 3.4 acres (1.4 ha) house and property faced demolition and development until Steve Fulgoni, a local historian, discovered its provenance. Fulgoni alerted Alice Coltrane, owner Ash Agrawal, and the Huntington Historic Preservation Committee, who together sought a benefactor to buy the home in 2004.

In 2006, the home was purchased by the Town of Huntington and given to the Friends of the Coltrane Home.

In 2007, the home was added to the New York State and the National Register of Historic Places. In 2011, the National Trust for Historic Preservation included the home on its list of the America's Most Endangered Places.

In 2018, it received an award from the African American Cultural Heritage Action Fund.

== See also ==
- Louis Armstrong House and Archives
- John Coltrane House (in Philadelphia)
