= The Trance of Seven Colors =

Live album by Maleem Mahmoud Guinia with Pharoah Sanders
- Released: Sep 27, 1994
- Recorded: June 1–3, 1994
- Venues: House of the Caid Khoubane in the Medina of Essaouira, District Chbanat, Morocco
- Genre: Gnawa
- Length: 1:11:14
- Labels: Axiom, Island Records, Zehra
- Producer: Bill Laswell

The Trance of Seven Colors is an album by Gnawa musician Maleem Mahmoud Guinia released by Axiom and Island Records in 1994. The music, which was recorded on June 1–3, 1994 at the house of the Caid Khoubane in the Medina of Essaouira, District Chbanat, Morocco, also features tenor saxophonist Pharoah Sanders, along with a group largely consisting of members of Mahmoud's family.

On this album, Guinia is heard on lead vocals, Tbel (tambourine), and Guimbri, which is a bass-like, hollow-bodied instrument roughly three feet in length. The body, which can be struck by the musician as the strings are plucked, is covered with camel skin, while the strings are made from goat intestines. Members of Guinia's family are well known as makers of Guimbri.

The title of the album refers to the fact that in Gnawa trance ceremonies, which can last eight or more hours (usually an entire night), the Maleem, or master musician, guides the group through a cycle of invocation of seven mluk (singular melk; "an abstract entity that gathers a number of similar jnun (genie spirits)"), each of which is characterized by a different color, rhythm, melody, behavior, and type of incense. During the ceremony, known as the lila, participants, in a trance state, negotiate relationships with their mluk. According to ethnomusicologist Timothy D. Fuson, "because the mluk must be invoked in a certain order, the lila follows a path through the night whose road is marked in the sensory realms of sound (music, song), sight (colors), smell (incense), and movement (dance)."

== Reception ==
Professional ratings
Review scores
Source	Rating
AllMusic	3/5 stars
All About Jazz	4/5 stars
The Attic	4/5 stars

In a review for AllMusic, Wilson McCloy wrote: "To call this outing 'authentic' would be an understatement, given that Bill Laswell and Pharoah Sanders took only some digital recording equipment and Sanders' saxophone to Morocco to record it. The CD sleeve photos show the informal nature of the proceedings, revealing that the recording took place in someone's home with a large cast of musicians, many of whom are Guinia's family members. The recording did not suffer at all from the mobile equipment, and The Trance of Seven Colors lives up to its title, giving the listener first-hand access to Gnawa healing ceremonial music. Guinia's Guimbri (an African instrument) unravels masterful, off-kilter, bass-like lines over chanting and various percussion instruments. Pharoah Sanders sounds inspired in the setting also, making this a worthwhile recording for Sanders fans who heard intimations of world music in his '60s dates."

Writing for All About Jazz, Chris May called the album "outstanding" and "360° authentic", and commented: "Laswell's production is formula-free and there appear to be no overdubs, no post-production sonic manipulations and only a little editing. It is a field recording, pure and simple and, apart from a couple of occasions when Sanders veers off-mic, it is well recorded... On The Trance Of Seven Colors... driven by gnawa's relentless rhythm and sandpaper sonics, and most particularly perhaps by the raw reediness of the ghaitas, Sanders frequently scrolls back to the ESP/Coltrane paradigm, which was packed with high harmonics, split tones and low register honks."

Dragos Rusu, in an article at The Attic, remarked: "This is a totally special album. It is... one of the most important albums of Gnawa trance music released in the '90s... The album... is an amazing journey through free jazz, fusion, tribal and trance Gnawa music. Take your time to enjoy an extraordinary and complex LP, with music that could best be described as 'healing music'. The combination of different harmonies played on guembri... with Pharoah's (sometimes) brutal and sublime interventions make this record a totally adventurous trip... Not only is this going to boost your boring day, but you'll be totally healed after a few auditions."

An article at JazzIz titled "Year By Year: Five Essential Albums of 1994" by Matt Micucci states: "The Trance of Seven Colors documents the mindblowing meeting of the percussive Gnawa healing ceremonial music of southern Morocco and the free jazz improvisational genius of Pharaoh Sanders... [Bill] Laswell brought with him only some simple digital recording equipment and the blowing date took place in the courtyard of a private house with a large ensemble mostly made up of Guinia's family members. The simplicity of the recording process makes The Trance of Seven Colors sound all the more authentic and transportative."

Don Heckman of the Los Angeles Times gave it three out of four stars, calling it a "remarkable coming together".

== Track listing ==
Track 1 by Maleem Mahmoud Guinia and Pharoah Sanders. Track 4 by Pharoah Sanders. Tracks, 2, 3, and 5-9 traditional.

1. "La Allah Dayim Moulenah" – 11:10
2. "Bala Moussaka" – 3:54
3. "Hamdouchi" – 9:07
4. "Peace In Essaouira (For Sonny Sharrock)" – 7:23
5. "Boulandi Samawi" – 13:56
6. "Moussa Berkiyo / Koubaliy Beriah La'Foh" – 4:34
7. "Salat Anbi" – 8:17
8. "Casa Casa Atougra" – 5:05
9. "Marhaba" – 7:48

Recorded on June 1–3, 1994 at the house of the Caid Khoubane in the Medina of Essaouira, District Chbanat, Morocco

== Personnel ==
- Maleem Mahmoud Guinia – Guimbri, Lead Vocal, Tbel (Tambourine)
- Pharoah Sanders – Tenor Saxophone
- Maleem Boubker Guinia – Second Guimbri on "Moussa Berkiyo / Koubaliy Beriah La'Foh", Tbel
- Maleem Mahmoud Ahkaraz – Tbel on "Casa Casa Atougra"
- Maleem Abdellah Guinia – Krkaba (crotales), Vocal Chorus, Handclaps
- Abdellah Ahkaraz – Krkaba, Vocal Chorus, Handclaps
- El Moktar Guinia – Krkaba, Vocal Chorus, Handclaps
- Mohamed Abdellaoui – Krkaba, Vocal Chorus, Handclaps
- Mohamed Outanine – Krkaba, Vocal Chorus, Handclaps
- Abdellatif Abdellaoui – Krkaba, Vocal Chorus, Handclaps
- Hassan Machoure – Krkaba, Vocal Chorus, Handclaps
- Mohamed Boujmia – Krkaba, Vocal Chorus, Handclaps
- Abdellah Lamsouger – Handclaps
- Hamadcha of Essaouira (on "Hamdouchi" only): Maleem Abdelkabir Addabachi – Lead Ghaita; Abdelmalak Ben Hamou – Ghaita; Abderrahman Nimini – Tbel; Abdelmoula Hnikkich – Harraz; Mustapha Bousan – Harraz
- Female Vocal Chorus: Zaida Guinia (leader); Mina Ahkaraz, Saida Battach, Fatna Ifis, Fatima Labied, Hafida Guinia, J'mia Guinia, Khadija Guinia, Malika Guinia
