= Aicha (album) =

Studio album by Maalem Mahmoud Gania
- Released: 2020
- Genres: Gnawa, Folk music, World music
- Labels: Hive Mind Records; HMRLP010

Aicha is an album by Moroccan Gnawa singer and guembri player Maalem Mahmoud Gania. It was recorded in Gania's home town of Essaouira with a small group of supporting musicians, and was initially released on cassette in the late 1990s for distribution within Morocco before being remastered and issued on vinyl in 2020 by Hive Mind Records as the label's tenth release. Aicha is a follow-up to 2017's Colours of the Night, also released on Hive Mind.

== Reception ==
Professional ratings
Review scores
Source	Rating
Spectrum Culture	7/10 stars

Spectrum Culture's Pat Padua stated that the album "finds the master in a contemplative mood suitable for a healing ritual," and wrote: "Aicha begins at a deliberate pace that slows the world to a meditative state. As the rhythms gradually accelerate, Gania and his band achieve a heightened sense of time; the album seems to follow a world that has slowed down, fallen into a state or urgency and then eventually found a comfortable daily rhythm."

Kenny Perez of Radio Milwaukee called the album "a trance... dizzying and yet gentle," and described "Assamaou" as "a good place to start exploring [Gania's] hypnotic and spiritually nurturing music."

In an article for Monolith Cocktail, Dominic Valvona commented: "Gania's signature instrument weaves a nice bluesy accompaniment to his soulful exaltations... It makes for a lively but soothing liturgy of entrancing adulation and praise... a Gnawa highlight, and a great place to begin discovering this immersive and special music."

A writer for The Vinyl Factory described Aicha as "a masterpiece that certainly deserves Hive Mind's affectionate remaster and vinyl treatment," and remarked: "It emanates powerful energies of ritual poetry and an urgent sense of ecstatic rhythm, both of which seamlessly mingle with Gania's transcendental guimbri skills."

Writing for Music Is My Sanctuary, Oli Brunetti called the album "incredible," and stated: "To these ears, 'Aicha' could arguably be the best, readily available introduction to the deeply resonating tones of the guinbri..., call & response and vocals and trance-inducing effect of gnawa music."

== Track listing ==
Side A

1. "La Ilha Illa Allah" – 8:58
2. "Lalla Aicha" – 7:03
3. "Assamaou" – 7:10

Side B

1. "Al Boudali" – 8:04
2. "Bangara Bangara" – 6:22
3. "El Bahraoui" – 8:04

== Personnel ==
- Maalem Mahmoud Gania – guembri, vocals
- Unnamed musicians – percussion, vocals
