= Gnawa and World Music Festival =

Annual Moroccan Gnawa music festival

Coordinates: 31°30′41″N 9°46′20″W

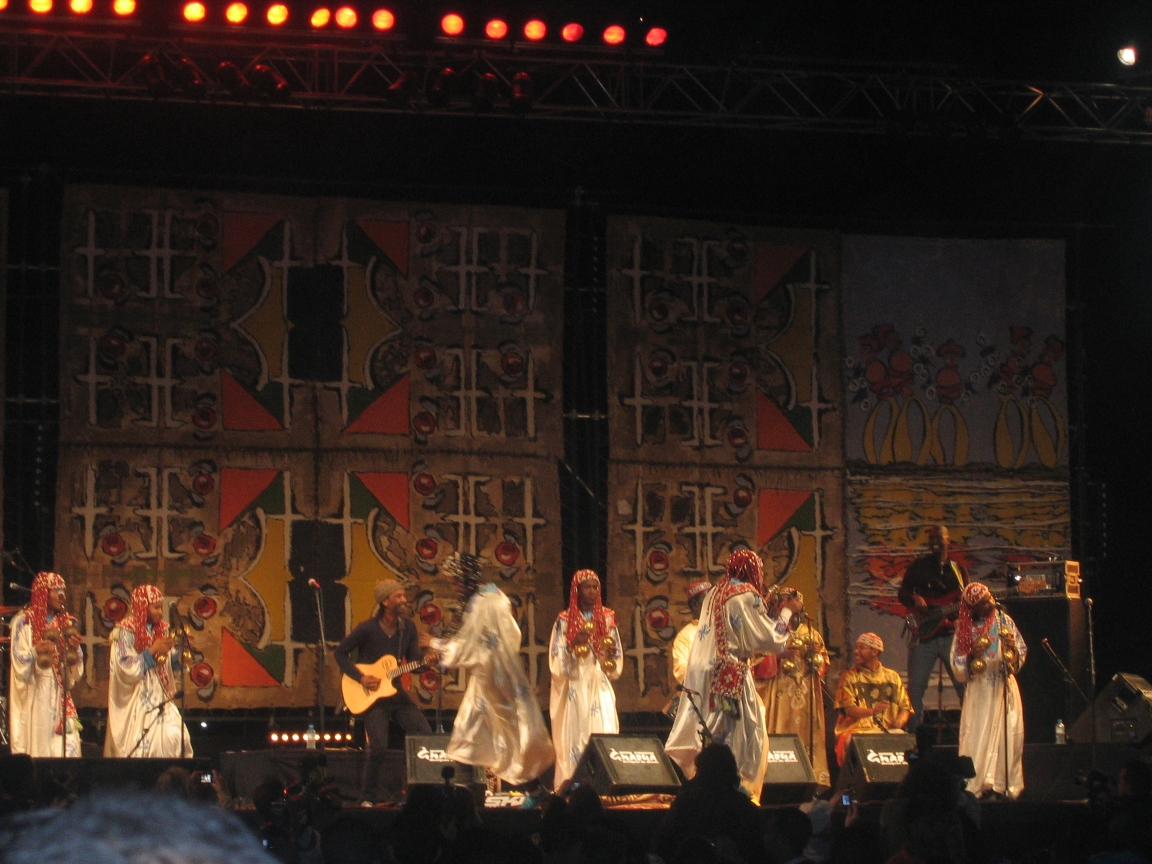
Gnaoua (Gnawa) musicians performing during the 2010 Gnaoua World Music Festival in the city of Essaouira, Morocco

The Gnaoua World Music Festival is a festival for mainly Gnawa music artists, held annually in Essaouira, Morocco. It was founded in 1998 by Moroccan entrepreneur Neila Tazi and her A3 Groupe, a private event-organizing company located in Casablanca.

The festival provides a platform for concerts and exchange between the mystical Gnaoua (also Gnawa) musicians of Morocco and invited artists from abroad. In this musical fusion, the Gnaoua master musicians invite players of jazz, pop, rock and contemporary World music to perform together. The festival has attracted up to 500,000 visitors every year over four days, as many performances can be attended for free, unlike other festivals.

== See also ==
- Gnaoua (ethnic group)
- Moga Festival
- Visa for Music
