= Colours of the Night =

(The) Colours of the Night may refer to four albums:

- Colours of the Night (Maalem Mahmoud Gania album), 2017
- Colours of the Night (Peter Broderick album), 2015
- The Colours of the Night, a 2015 album by Pete Atkin
- The Colours of the Night, a 2009 album by Nick Pynn
