= The Catch of a Ghost =

Live album by Peter Brötzmann, Moukhtar Gania, and Hamid Drake
- Released: 2020
- Recorded: May 10, 2019
- Venue: Centro di Ricerca Musicale / Teatro San Leonardo, Bologna, Italy
- Genre: Free jazz
- Length: 1:12:10
- Label: I Dischi Di Angelica; IDA 041
- Producer: Massimo Simonini

The Catch of a Ghost is a live album by German saxophonist Peter Brötzmann, Moroccan guembri player Moukhtar Gania, and American drummer Hamid Drake. It was recorded in May 2019 at the Centro di Ricerca Musicale / Teatro San Leonardo in Bologna, Italy, during AngelicA, Festival Internazionale di Musica, and was released in 2020 by I Dischi Di Angelica. Brötzmann and Drake had previously recorded the album The Wels Concert (1997) with Gania's brother Mahmoud Gania, who died in 2015.

== Reception ==
Professional ratings
Review scores
Source	Rating
All About Jazz	4/5 stars
The Free Jazz Collective	3.5/5 stars
Tom Hull – on the Web	A−

In a review for All About Jazz, Mark Corroto wrote: "The music occupies a space beyond world music and, in some ways, outside of free jazz. Sure, we hear that familiar Brötzmann plaintive cry throughout, but the rhythms delivered by Drake and Gania are so mesmerizing... that this live date takes on a hypnotic atmosphere."

Eyal Hareuveni of The Free Jazz Collective noted "the tension between Brötzmann's spectrum of contemplative, sometimes even lyrical playing and his wild swings and the one-dimensional, repetitive and trance-like rhythm section," and praised passages where the saxophonist's "wailing answers cleverly the vocal phrases of Gania and often pushes the interplay to intense, ecstatic terrains."

Critic Tom Hull awarded the album an "A−", and stated that Gania "centers this album, the jazz greats working around him, but also providing him with edges that lift him way above the merely exotic."

Writing for The Wire, Peter Margasak commented: "the... partnership delivers magically shifting and embroidering grooves, digging into twangy, cycling patterns, and achieving a trance-inducing ecstasy where spontaneity feels preternatural."

Phil Freeman of Burning Ambulance remarked: "Brötzmann is in a questing mood, emitting long rattling cries like a phlegmatic bull and only occasionally erupting into full-on screams. The music rises and falls like ocean waves or ripples in desert sand, seeming to have no beginning or end." However, he noted that "Mokhtar simply lacks the aggressiveness [his brother] Mahmoud possessed."

A reviewer for Avant Music News called the album "a tuneful and challenging set of songs and improvisations," and wrote: "Thumbs way up."

== Track listing ==
Music by Hamid Drake, Mokhtar Gania, and Peter Brötzmann

1. "The Catch of a Ghost" – 33:29
2. "Almost With the Sun" – 11:12
3. "Sound That Shimmers" – 13:16
4. "Dip and Dive" – 14:13

== Personnel ==
- Peter Brötzmann – tenor saxophone, tárogató
- Moukhtar Gania – guembri, vocals
- Hamid Drake – drums
