= Glastonbury Festival 2016 =

Annual music festival in England

- Date: 22 June 2016 – 26 June 2016
- Locations: Worthy Farm, Pilton, Somerset, England
- Previous event: Glastonbury Festival 2015
- Next event: Glastonbury Festival 2017
- Website: www.glastonburyfestivals.co.uk

The 2016 Glastonbury Festival of Contemporary Performing Arts took place between 22 and 26 June.

== Tickets ==
General Admission Tickets for the festival cost £228.

== Weather ==
The weather was very wet on Wednesday 22 June with major traffic delays getting to the festival. Organisers said that rain and ground conditions had caused delays and urged people "not to set off".

Festival founder and Worthy Farm owner Michael Eavis later commented "I’ve never seen mud like it in the whole life. This is worse than 1997...In all 46 years, it hasn’t been as bad as this".

== Line-up ==
Headlining the festival were Muse, Adele and Coldplay on the Friday, Saturday and Sunday respectively.

Pyramid Stage
Friday	Saturday	Sunday
Muse; 22:15 - 23:45; Foals; 20:00 - 21:15; ZZ Top; 18:15 - 19:15; Jess Glynne; 16:30 - 17:30; Two Door Cinema Club; 15:00 - 16:00; Skepta; 13:45 - 14:30; Rokia Traoré; 12:30 - 13:15; The Orchestra of Syrian Musicians with Damon Albarn; 11:00 - 12:00	Adele; 22:15 - 23:45; Tame Impala; 20:00 - 21:15; The Last Shadow Puppets; 18:15 - 19:15; Madness; 16:30 - 17:30; Wolf Alice; 15:00 - 16:00; Baaba Maal; 13:40 - 14:30; Squeeze; 12:25 - 13:15; Lewisham and Greenwich NHS Choir; 11:30 - 12:00	Coldplay; 21:30 - 23:15; Beck; 19:15 - 20:30; Ellie Goulding; 17:45 - 18:45; Jeff Lynne's ELO; 16:00 - 17:15; Laura Mvula; 14:30 - 15:15; Gregory Porter; 13:00 - 14:00; Caravan Palace; 12:00 - 12:40; Burnham and Highbridge Band; 11:00 - 11:30
Other Stage
Friday	Saturday	Sunday
Disclosure; 22:35 - 23:50; Bastille; 20:45 - 21:45; Bring Me the Horizon; 19:20 - 20:15; Editors; 17:55 - 18:50; The Lumineers; 16:30 - 17:25; Frightened Rabbit; 15:15 - 16:00; Christine and the Queens; 14:10 - 14:55; Blossoms; 13:05 - 13:50; James; 11:50 - 12:45	New Order; 22:30 - 23:45; Chvrches; 20:45 - 21:45; The 1975; 19:15 - 20:15; Tom Odell; 17:45 - 18:45; Band of Skulls; 16:15 - 17:15; Hurts; 14:45 - 15:45; St. Paul and The Broken Bones; 13:15 - 14:15; Shura; 12:00 - 12:45; Hælos; 11:00 - 11:40	LCD Soundsystem; 21:45 - 23:15; PJ Harvey; 19:50 - 21:00; Catfish and the Bottlemen; 18:20 - 19:20; Years & Years; 16:50 - 17:50; Jamie Lawson; 15:30 - 16:20; Paul Heaton + Jacqui Abbott; 14:20 - 15:10; Bear's Den; 13:20 - 14:00; Newton Faulkner; 12:20 - 13:00; Anteros; 11:30 - 12:00
West Holts Stage
Friday	Saturday	Sunday
Underworld; 22:15 - 23:45; Róisín Murphy; 20:30 - 21:30; White Denim; 19:00 - 20:00; Protoje; 17:30 - 18:30; Vince Staples; 16:00 - 17:00; DakhaBrakha; 14:30 - 15:30; Bixiga 70; 13:00 - 14:00; Paradise Bangkok Molam International Band; 11:30 - 12:30	James Blake; 22:15 - 23:45; Santigold; 20:30 - 21:30; The Very Best; 19:00 - 20:00; Shibusashirazu Orchestra; 17:30 - 18:30; Mbongwana Star; 16:00 - 17:00; Little Simz; 14:30 - 15:30; Oddisee & Good Cmpny; 13:00 - 14:00; Anna Meredith; 11:30 - 12:30	Earth, Wind & Fire; 21:45 - 23:15; Gary Clark Jr. 20:00 - 21:00; Quantic All Stars; 18:30 - 19:30; Anoushka Shankar; 17:00 - 18:00; Michael Kiwanuka; 15:30 - 16:30; Kamasi Washington; 14:00 - 15:00; Eska; 12:30 - 13:30; Human Pyramids; 11:15 - 12:00
John Peel Stage
Friday	Saturday	Sunday
Sigur Rós; 22:30 - 23:45; AlunaGeorge; 21:00 - 22:00; Explosions in the Sky; 19:30 - 20:30; Jack Garratt; 18:10 - 19:00; Half Moon Run; 16:50 - 17:40; Aurora; 15:30 - 16:20; Rat Boy; 14:10 - 15:00; Elle King; 13:00 - 13:40; X Ambassadors; 12:00 - 12:40; Dan Stuart With Twin Jones; 11:00 - 11:40	M83; 22:30 - 22:45; Fatboy Slim; 20:30 - 22:00; Example; 19:20 - 20:10; John Grant; 17:50 - 18:50; MØ; 16:40 - 17:30; Låpsley; 15:10 - 16:10; Alessia Cara; 13:50 - 14:40; Dua Lipa; 12:45 - 13:25; Nothing but Thieves; 11:50 - 12:20; Palace; 11:00 - 11:30	Jake Bugg; 22:00 - 23:15; Mac DeMarco; 20:30 - 21:30; Of Monsters and Men; 19:00 - 20:00; Band of Horses; 17:30 - 18:30; Bat for Lashes; 16:00 - 17:00; Mystery Jets; 14:30 - 15:30; Matt Corby; 13:00 - 14:00; Tired Lion; 11:50 - 12:30; She Drew the Gun; 11:00 - 11:30
The Park Stage
Friday	Saturday	Sunday
Richard Hawley; 23:00 - 00:15; Savages; 21:30 - 22:30; Ronnie Spector; 20:00 - 21:00; Daughter; 18:30 - 19:30; Ezra Furman; 17:00 - 18:00; Unknown Mortal Orchestra; 15:30 - 16:30; Nao; 14:15 - 15:00; Night Beats; 13:00 - 13:45; Declan McKenna; 12:00 - 12:45; Gwenno; 11:00 - 11:30	Philip Glass' Heroes Symphony; 23:45 - 00:30; Mercury Rev; 21:30 - 22:30; Floating Points (Live); 20:00 - 21:00; Ernest Ranglin & Friends; 18:30 - 19:30; Kurt Vile; 17:00 - 18:00; Jagwar Ma; 15:30 - 16:30; Lady Leshurr; 14:10 - 15:00; Izzy Bizu; 13:00 - 13:45; Cat's Eyes; 12:00 - 12:40; Car Seat Headrest; 11:00 - 11:30	Grimes; 21:00 - 22:00; Guy Garvey; 19:30 - 20:30; Saint Etienne; 18:00 - 19:00; Kwabs; 16:30 - 17:30; Nathaniel Rateliff & the Night Sweats; 15:10 - 16:00; Hinds; 14:00 - 14:45; C Duncan; 13:00 - 13:40; Holly Macve; 12:00 - 12:40; Khruangbin; 11:00 - 11:30
Acoustic Stage
Friday	Saturday	Sunday
John Lees' Barclay James Harvest; 21:30 - 23:00; Hothouse Flowers; 20:00 - 21:00; Sharon Shannon; 18:30 - 19:30; Ed Harcourt; 17:25 - 18:10; The Alarm; 16:25 - 17:05; Goitse; 15:30 - 16:10; Michele Stodard; 14:30 - 15:10; Ward Thomas; 13:35 - 14:20; Monty Taft; 12:45 - 13:20; Roxanne De Bastion; 12:00 - 12:30	The Shires; 21:45 - 23:00; Art Garfunkel; 20:10 - 21:25; Paul Carrack; 18:45 - 19:45; Ralph McTell; 17:20 - 18:15; Nine Below Zero; 16:20 - 17:05; Glen Matlock; 15:25 - 16:05; Sam Lee; 14:30 - 15:10; Lewis & Leigh; 13:35 - 14:15; Hardwicke Circus; 12:40 - 13:20; Monty Taft; 12:00 - 12:30	Cyndi Lauper; 21:30 - 23:00; Gabrielle Aplin; 20:00 - 21:00; The Bootleg Beatles; 18:30 - 19:30; Fisherman's Friends; 17:25 - 18:15; Patty Griffin; 16:20 - 17:05; The High Kings; 15:25 - 16:05; Hattie Whitehead; 14:30 - 15:10; Applewood Road; 13:35 - 14:15; The Cornshed Sisters; 12:45 - 13:20; Blair Dunlop; 12:00 - 12:30

== Live album ==
A live album of numerous performances at the festival entitled Stand As One was released in aid of Oxfam and their Refugee Crisis Appeal. It is also dedicated to the memory of Jo Cox. It was released as a digital download on 29 July 2016 and as a CD on 12 August 2016. Artists including Coldplay, Foals, Muse, The Last Shadow Puppets, Fatboy Slim, Wolf Alice, CHVRCHES, Jamie Lawson, Sigur Rós, Laura Mvula, Jack Garratt, The 1975, Years & Years, Editors, Two Door Cinema Club and John Grant feature on the album.
