= Gnawa =

Ethnic group of Morocco

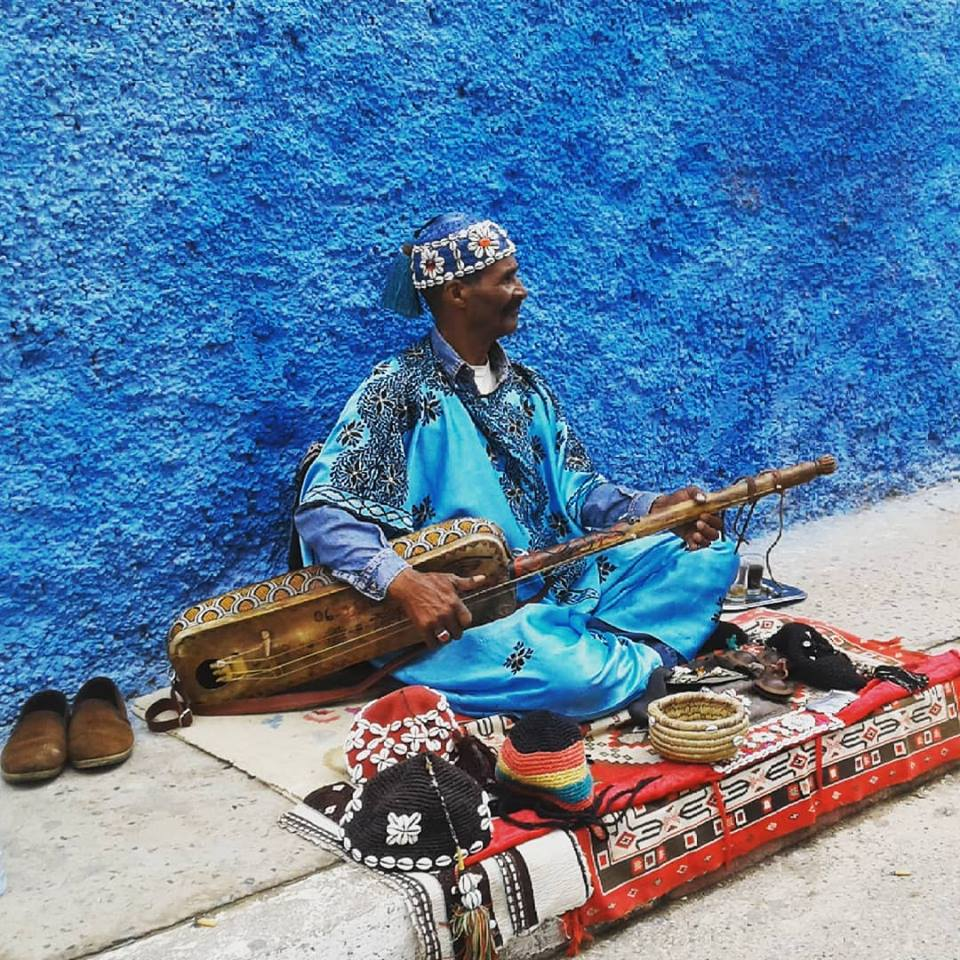
A Gnawi

The Gnawa (/ɡ(ə)ˈnɑːwə/) (or Gnaoua, Ghanawa, Ghanawi, Gnawi'; Arabic: ڭناوة, romanized: Gnāwa) are an ethnic minority inhabiting southern Morocco, who had been brought to Morocco as slaves from West Africa’s Jaych Abid El Bakhira Sahel.

The name Gnawa originated in the indigenous languages of North Africa and the Sahara Desert. The phonology of this term according to the grammatical principles of Berber is agnaw (singular) and ignawen (plural), which means "black person."

Gnawa music was inscribed in 2019 on the Representative List of the Intangible Cultural Heritage of Humanity.

== History ==
The Gnawa population is generally believed to originate from the Sahelian region of West Africa, which had long and extensive trading and political ties with Morocco. The Gnawa descend from Sahelian slaves, with linguistic analysis pointing especially to the Soninke, Bambara, Fulani and Hausa. They became a part of the Sufi order in the Maghreb. While Muslims, the Gnawa continued to celebrate ritual some possession during rituals which were devoted to the practice of dances of possession and fright. This rite of possession is called Jedba (Arabic: جدبة).

== Gnawa and music ==
Gnaoua
- UNESCO Intangible Cultural Heritage
- Gnawa performers in Oxford Street, London
- Country: Morocco
- Reference: 01170
- Region: Arab States

Inscription history
- Inscription: 2019 (14th session)
- List: Representative

Gnawa music mixes classical Islamic Sufism with pre-Islamic African folk traditions. The term Gnawa musicians generally refers to people who also practice healing rituals. The healing rituals have apparent ties to pre-Islamic African animism rites known as Bori in the Hausa culture. In Moroccan popular culture, Gnawas, through their ceremonies, are considered to be experts in the magical treatment of scorpion stings and mental illness. They heal mental diseases by the use of colors, condensed cultural imagery, perfumes and fright.

Gnawas play deeply hypnotic trance music marked by low-toned, rhythmic melodies played on a skin-covered lute called a sintir, guembri or hajhouj. The method, similar to garaya in Hausa traditional music, involves call-and-response singing, hand-clapping, and cymbals called krakeb (plural of karkaba). Gnawa ceremonies use music and dance to evoke ancestral saints who are said to perform the healing.

Gnawa music has won an international profile and appeal. Many Western musicians, including Carlos Santana, Bill Laswell, Brian Jones, Randy Weston, Adam Rudolph, Klaus Doldinger, Tucker Martine, Robert Plant, Jacob Collier and Jimmy Page, have drawn on and collaborated with Gnawa musicians such as brothers Mahmoud Guinia and Mokhtar Gania of Essaouira, brothers Mustapha Baqbou & Ahmed Baqbou, Abdelkebir Merchane, Brahim Belkani, all from Marrakesh, as well as Hamid El Kasri and Abdelkader Amlil of Rabat and the late Ahmida Boussou and Saïd Oughassal of Casablanca, who have all participated at the annual festival in Essaouira. Some traditionalists regard modern collaborations as a mixed blessing, leaving or modifying sacred traditions for more explicitly commercial goals. International recording artists such as Hassan Hakmoun have introduced Gnawa music and dance to Western audiences through their recordings and concert performances.

The centres for Gnawa music are Marrakesh, Tangier, Rabat, Casablanca, Fez and Essaouira, which is in the southwest of Morocco where the Gnaoua World Music Festival is held annually. The Gnawa of Marrakesh hold their annual festival at the sanctuary of Moulay Brahim in the Atlas Mountains and around the sanctuary of Moulay Abdullah bin Tsain in the village of Tamesloht, between Marrakesh and the town of Amizmiz. The festivals take place in connection with the birthday of Muhammad.

The Gnawa of Khamlia hold their annual festival in August at the village of Khamlia in Erg Chebbi.

Finally there is also a special tribe inside Gnawa called Ganga. The Ganga are of subsaharan African origin and typically speak Tashelhait, and are found among the Haha between Essaouira and Agadir and in the Sous Valley around towns like Agadir and Taroudant. They do not play the guimbri but only focus on the dance known as kouyou, playing krakeb and the large drums called tebel or ganga, which is also part of the procession of the regular gnawa ceremony.

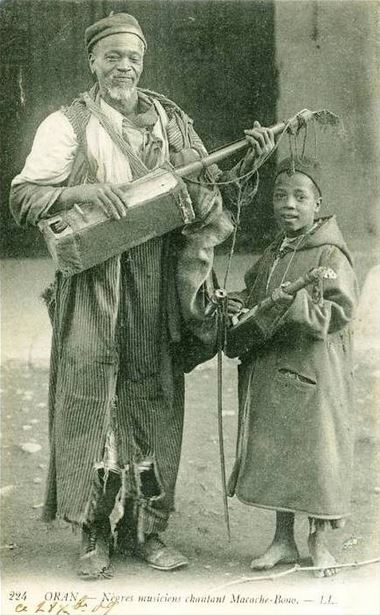
Gnaouas from Oran with their guembri.

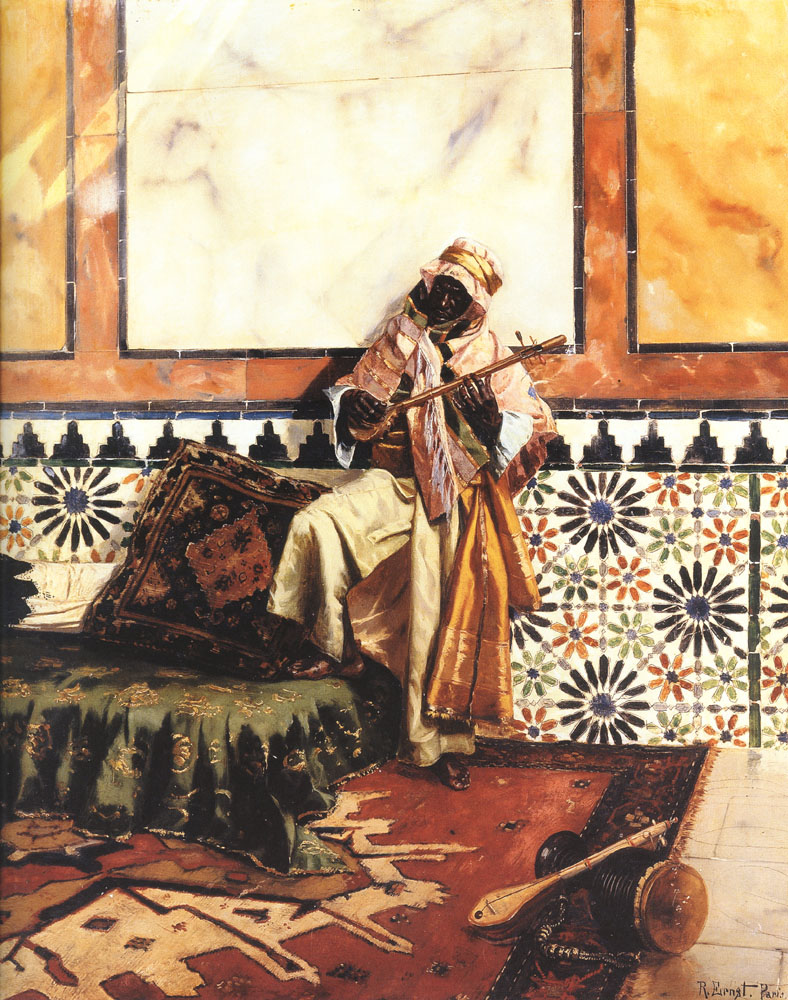
Gnaoua in a North African Interior

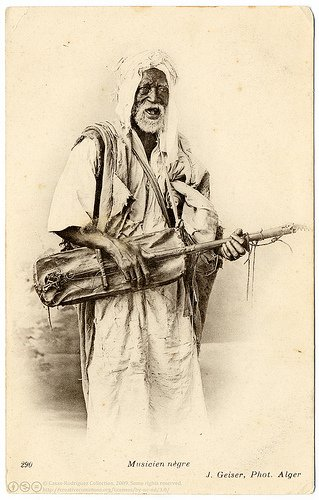
Gnawa from Algiers with his guembri (circa 1906) by Jean Geiser (1848-1923).

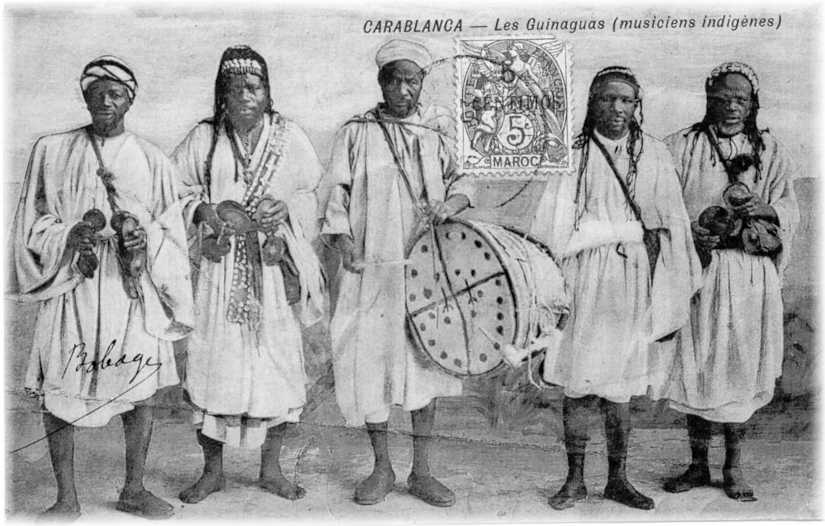
Gnawas circa 1920s

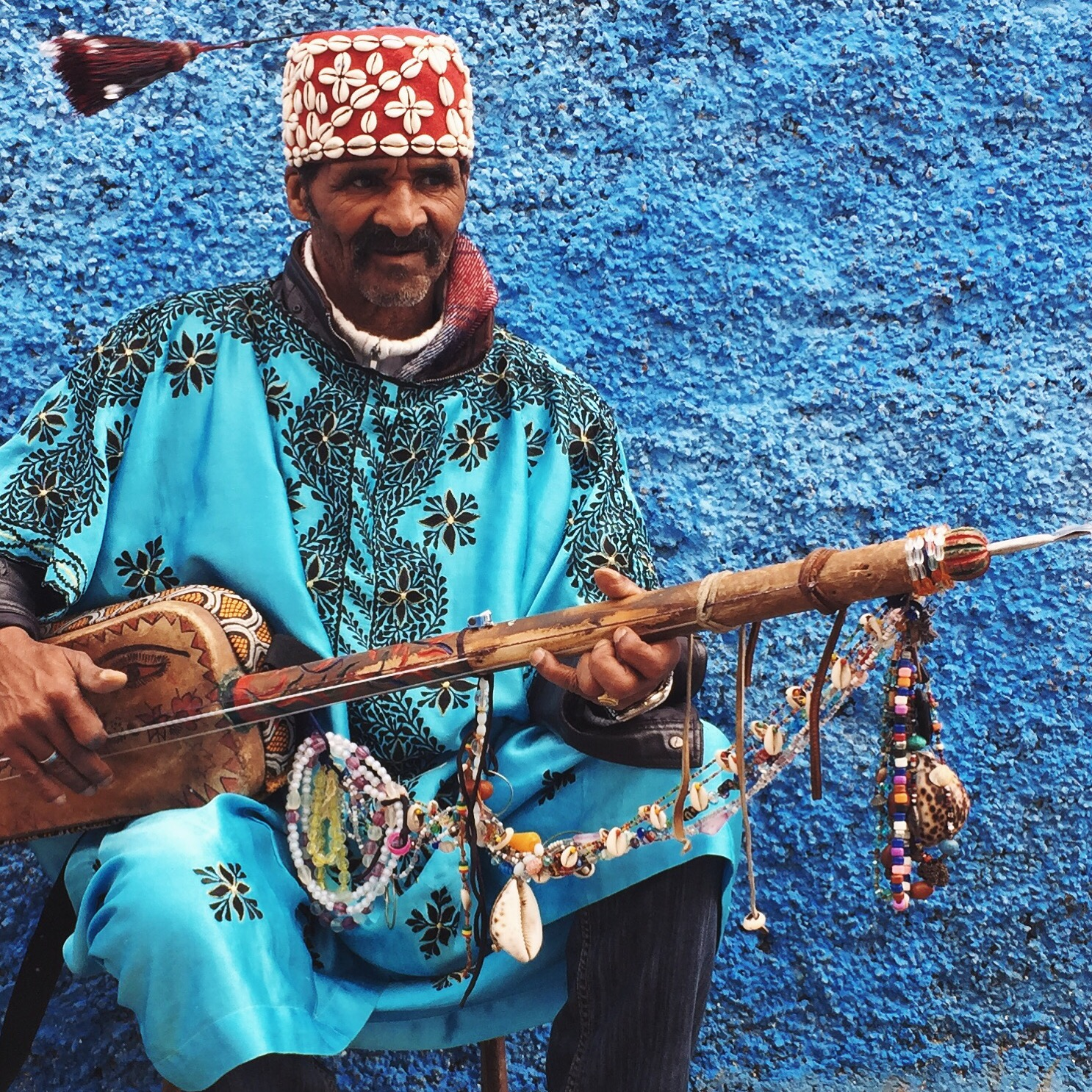
Music Teacher

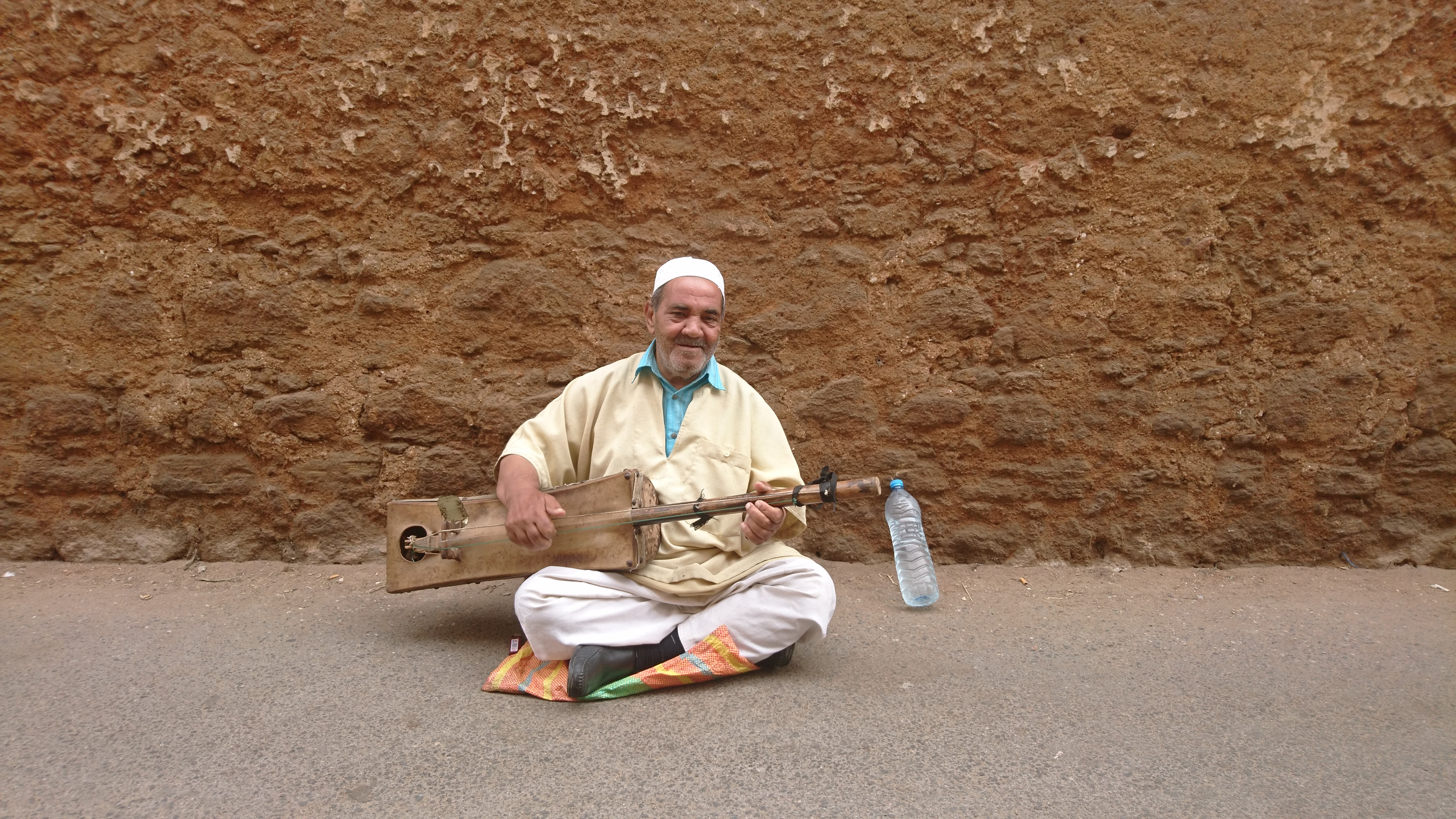
Gnawa singer in Salé, Morocco.

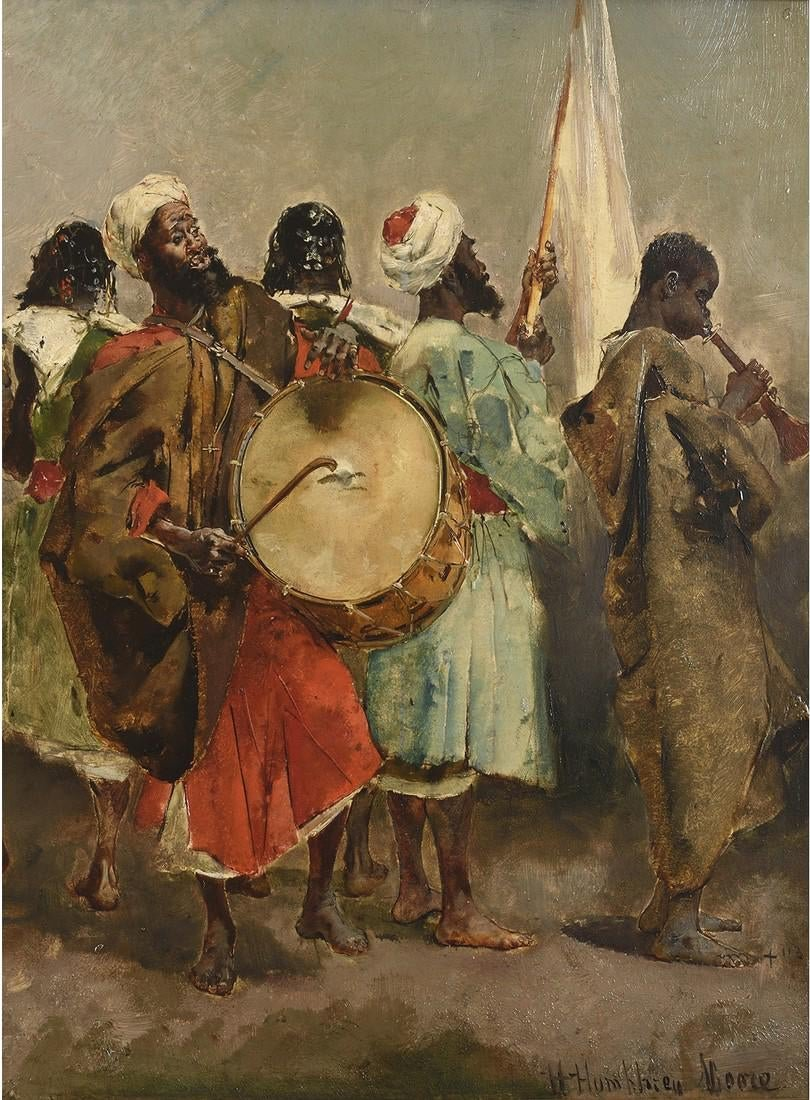
Gnawa Musicians, by Harry Humphrey Moore.

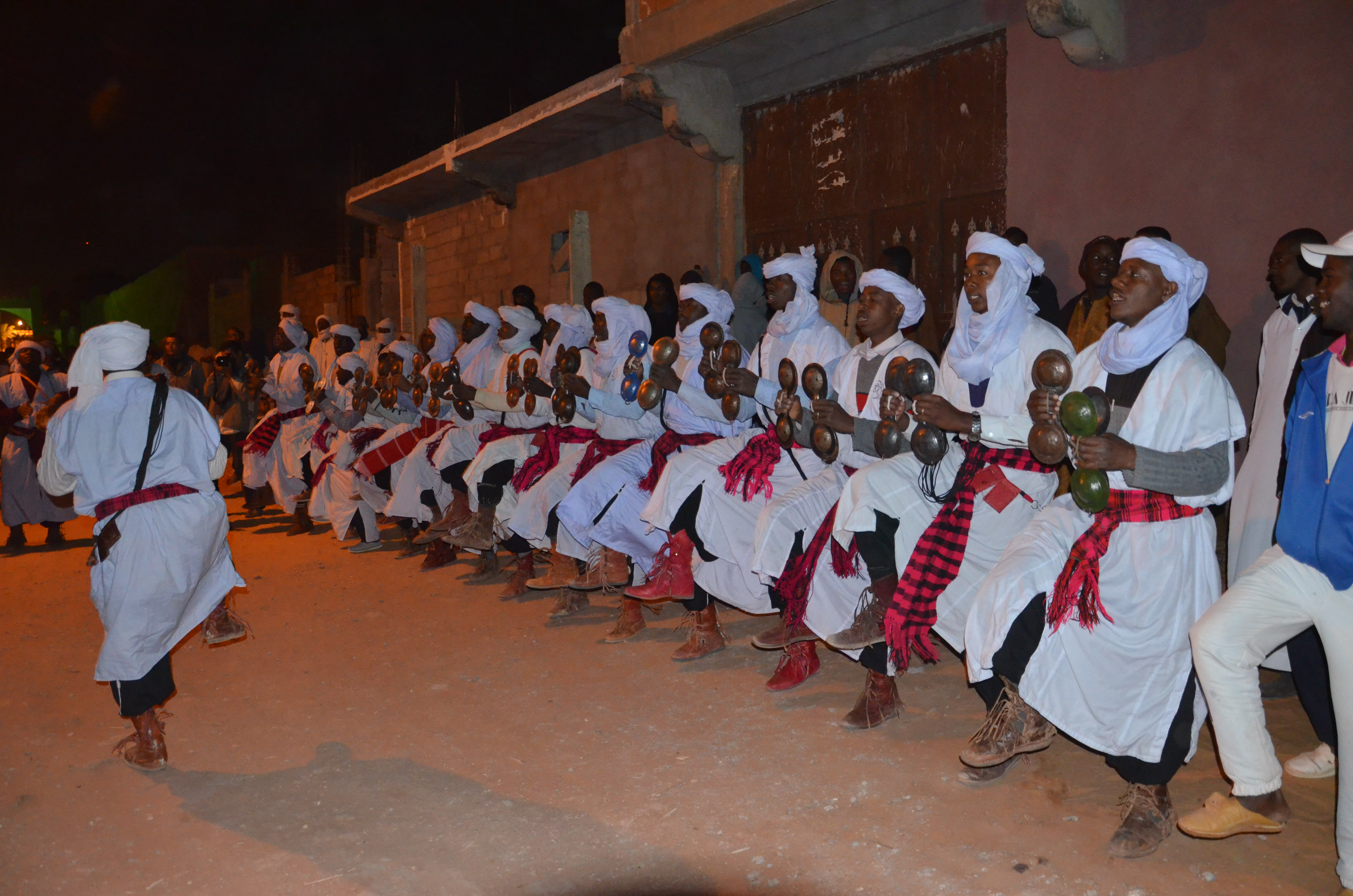
A group of Gnawas dance to a song.

== See also ==
- Bechar
- Essaouira
- Haha (tribe)
- Haratin
- Jilala
- Moga Festival

== General references ==
- Ibiblio.org: Gnawa Stories: Mystical Musician Healers from Morocco
- gnawa at the Moroccan ministry of Communication website
- WorldMusicCentral.org
- PTWMusic.com: gnawa by Chouki El Hamel at Duke University December 1, 2000
- Etymology of "Gnawa" from Encyclopædia Britannica
- Ben Saidi, A (2003) Amazigh Kateb Yassin discusses Maghreb Blues and Ghanawa Music-a diffusion of Berber, Arabic genres
