= The Wels Concert =

Live album by Peter Brötzmann, Mahmoud Guinia and Hamid Drake
- Released: 1997
- Recorded: November 8, 1996
- Venue: Schlachthof, Wels, Austria
- Genre: Free jazz
- Length: 1:10:18
- Label: Okka Disk; OD12013
- Producer: IMI-Gerlinde Koschik, Hamid Drake, John Corbett, Peter Brötzmann

The Wels Concert is a live album by German saxophonist Peter Brötzmann, Moroccan guembri player Mahmoud Guinia, and American drummer Hamid Drake. It was recorded in November 1996 at the Schlachthof cultural center in Wels, Austria, and was released in 1997 by Okka Disk.

In an interview, Brötzmann expressed his admiration for Guinia, and for Moroccan Gnawa music, stating: "In my way about thinking of the timing of tunes or pieces you play... after a time, you have to come to an end. But they never do - they get in a kind of trance... it goes on for hours and hours and hours." After Guinia's death in 2015, Brötzmann and Drake would go on to record the album The Catch of a Ghost (2020) with his brother, Moukhtar Guinia.

== Reception ==
Professional ratings
Review scores
Source	Rating
AllMusic	4.5/5 stars
The Penguin Guide to Jazz	3/4 stars
The Virgin Encyclopedia of Jazz	3/5 stars

In a review for AllMusic, Joslyn Lane described the album as "a powerful interaction of three musicians from different countries, each of whom have extraordinary improvisational abilities and deep, grounded technique." He stated that the music is "meditative" "in the ecstatic-trance sense of the word, meaning that the music's energy level has a natural ebb and flow," and noted that "this current results in an outside-of-time atmosphere that's meditative even while remaining very musically active." He concluded: "The result is a unified, energetic, affecting, free performance."

The authors of the Penguin Guide to Jazz Recordings called the album "impressive" but stated that Brötzmann is "often overwhelmed by the shamanic Gania," decorating "rather than finding a way into the music."

Steven A. Loewy, writing for Cadence, remarked: "The Wels Concert shows a different side to free improvisation and one that not only works, but adds a new dimension, an overlooked nook, a glimpse at eternity. What more can one expect?"

Author Mike Heffley called the album a "musical-traditional triangle with one point in Brötzmann's Northern Europe, one in the North African home of the Gnawa musicians, and the other in the African-American milieu of drummer Hamid Drake's Chicago." He commented: "The net result is a musical network that links up farthest flung voices of whiteness and blackness as imaged in the representations of African-American, African traditional, and German free jazz in the music press both academic and popular, and shows them to be integral, organic parts of the same musical village."

== Track listing ==
Composed by Hamid Drake and Peter Brötzmann.

1. "Part 1" – 25:46
2. "Part 2" – 25:15
3. "Part 3" – 19:17

== Personnel ==
- Peter Brötzmann – tárogató, clarinet, alto saxophone, tenor saxophone
- Mahmoud Guinia – guembri, vocals
- Hamid Drake – drums, frame drum, tabla
