= Colours of the Night (Maalem Mahmoud Gania album) =

Studio album by Maalem Mahmoud Gania
- Released: September 8, 2017
- Recorded: 2013
- Studio: Studio Plein Les Oreilles, Casablanca, Morocco
- Genre: Gnawa, Folk music, World music
- Label: Hive Mind Records; HMRLP001

Colours of the Night is an album by Moroccan Gnawa musician Maalem Mahmoud Gania. It was recorded in 2013 at Studio Plein Les Oreilles in Casablanca, Morocco, and was initially released on CD for distribution within Morocco before being issued as a double LP in 2017 by Hive Mind Records as the label's first release. The album was Gania's final studio recording before his death in 2015.

== Reception ==
Professional ratings
Review scores
| Source | Rating |
|---|---|
| The Attic | 5/5 stars |
| The Vinyl Voice | 9/10 stars |
| The Hum | 10/10 stars |

In a review for The Attic, Dragoș Rusu wrote: "This is deeply hypnotic trance music... this is considered healing music, evoking ancestral saints who can drive out evil, cure psychological harms or cure scorpion bites... [it] transports the listener into a magical land, a beautifully crafted landscape."

Harrison Murray of The Vinyl Voice stated: "This is sacred music that one must give oneself up to, inward, even guarded, rather than bursting out through the speakers and trying to sweep the listener off their feet in a wave of compulsory awe... It is an album of fine details, subdued gestures, and delicate, haunting beauty, sharing common elements with Western Afro-diasporic music, but through an entirely different cultural frame."

Writing for Monolith Cocktail, Dominic Valvona commented: "Gania's playing style is raw, deep and always infectious: from blistering solos to slower and lighter ruminating descriptive articulations; this is equally matched by his atavistic soulful voice and the chorus of swooning, venerated female and male voices and harmonies that join him on each track... As inaugural releases go, this one is definitely a winner."

The Hum's Bradford Bailey remarked: "Absolutely stunning and engrossing on every count, it's Gnawa music at its absolute best. The fact that it represents the last time this master's voice will appear, is heart-wrenching and made that much more tragic by its towering heights. It is a perfect capsule of nearly everything I love about music. If its hypnotic rhythms, call and response vocals, and rippling tones don't make your body heave and sway, you're probably dead."

The Wire included the album in their "Top 50 Releases of 2017."

== Track listing ==
=== Side A ===
1. "Sadati Houma El Bouhala" – 8:59
2. "Shaba Kouria" – 8:51

=== Side B ===
1. "Bala Matinba" – 11:00
2. "Amara Mousseye" – 8:16

=== Side C ===
1. "Foulani" – 9:42
2. "Sidi Sma Ya Boulandi" – 8:06

=== Side D ===
1. "Ba Yourki" – 8:04
2. "Mrahba Baba Hamouda" – 7:48

== Personnel ==
- Maalem Mahmoud Gania – guembri, lead vocals

with

- Karima El Filali
- Asmae Hazmaoui
- Chaimae Lofti
- Hazma Gania
- Houssam Gania
- Ahmed Elbnoua
- Mehdi Mnouer
- Abdellah Malibo
- Soufiane Aghmam
