= Moga Festival =

Moroccan music festival

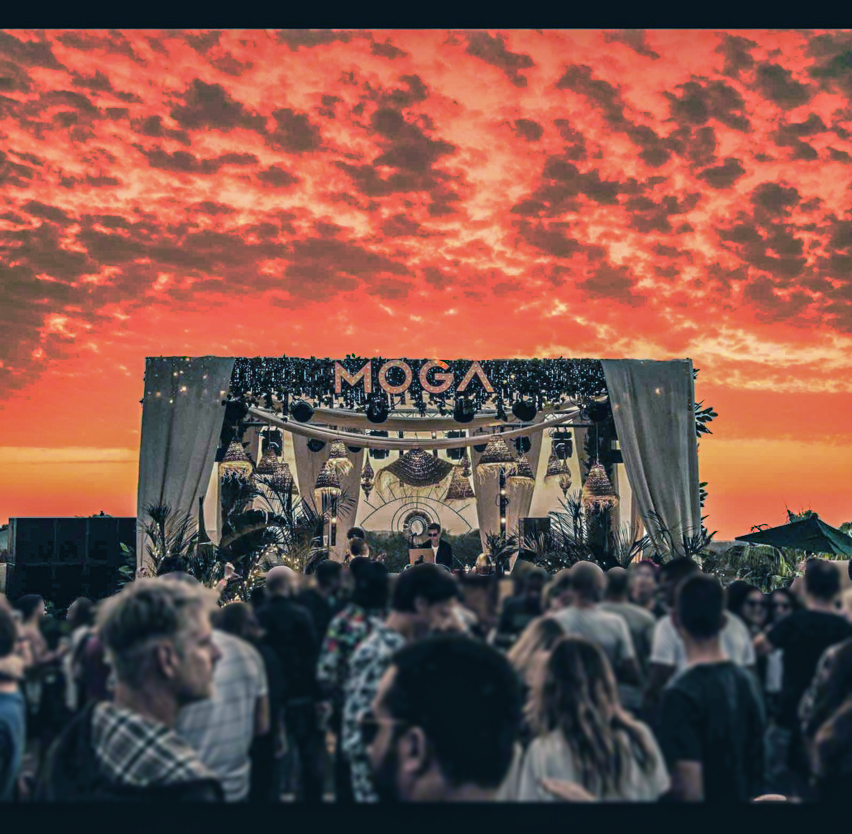
- Moga festival in 2018
- Genre: Gnawa music - electronic music
- Locations: Essaouira & Costa da Caparica Morocco - Portugal
- Years active: 2016 - 2025 present
- Founders: Matthieu Corosine - Abdeslam Alaoui - Benoit Geli

Moga Festival (مهرجان موڭا: Arabe:) is an electronic music festival held annually in Essaouira, Morocco and in Costa de Caparica, Portugal inspired by the decorations of the series Game of Thrones.

== History ==
The festival founded in 2016 by Matthieu Corosine, Abdeslam Alaoui and Benoit Geli, an event dedicated to contemporary music and digital arts. It has a program in the sets of the series Game of Thrones in Essaouira to connect international musicians and Moroccan artists (Gnawa Malems) with electronic music culture. Each year, the festival represents traditional Moroccan and electronic music for original projects created in this city, presented on stage during the festival.

== Program ==
Moga Festival invites amateur artists and musical groups to perform in this event for 5 days. They contribute to the development of the youth music scene through meetings in front of the public. The festival also has activities and workshops besides music to the community.

== See also ==
- Gnaoua World Music Festival
- Essaouira
- Gnaoua
