= Harry Humphrey Moore =

American painter

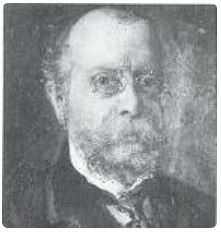
Harry Humphrey Moore (self-portrait?)

Harry Humphrey Moore (21 July 1844, New York City - 2 January 1926, Paris) was an American painter; best known for his works depicting Japan, Spain and North Africa.

== Biography ==
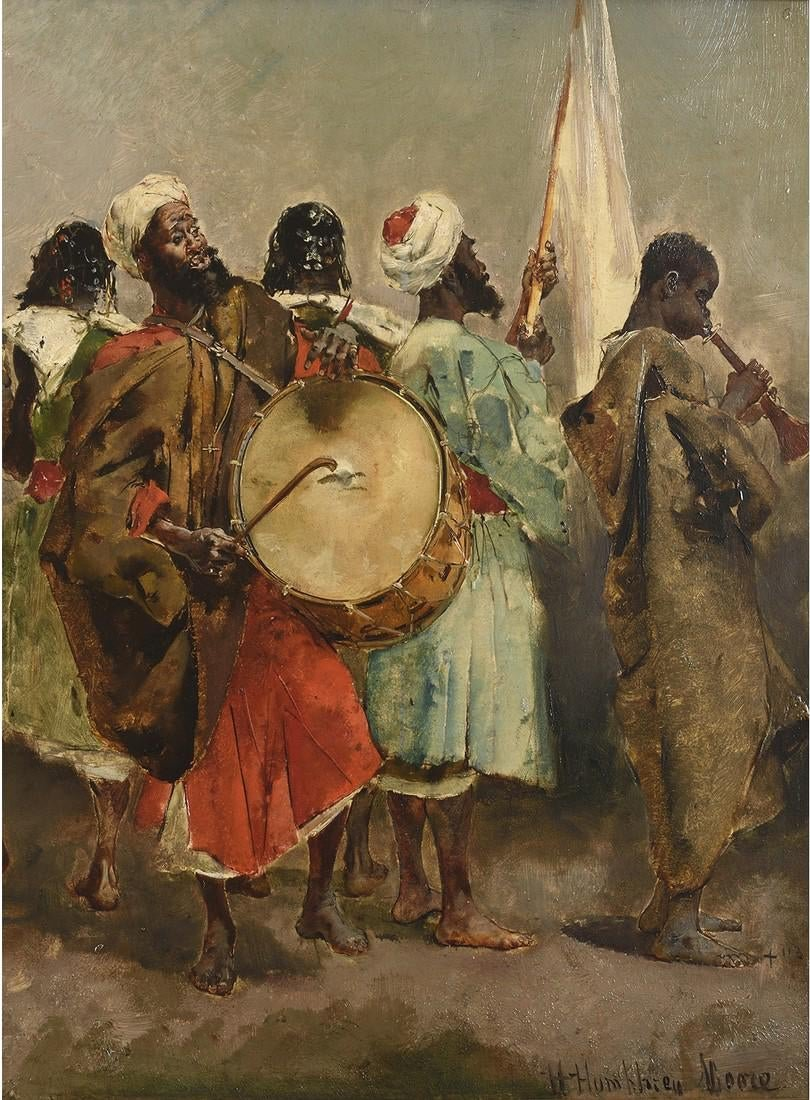
Gnawa Musicians

His father, Capt. George Humphrey Moore, was a shipbuilder and a descendant of Ozias Humphry, an English painter of portrait miniatures. He was either born deaf, or became so as a toddler. He initially attended the American School for the Deaf in West Hartford, America's oldest institution of that type, then transferred to the Pennsylvania School for the Deaf, in Philadelphia.

It was there he began taking art lessons from the portrait painter, Samuel Waugh. Through him, he met Thomas Eakins, and began taking lessons from him as well. Upon Eakins' recommendation, he went to Paris to study at the École des Beaux-Arts with Jean-Léon Gérôme. He also studied with Adolphe Yvon. Later, he took some courses in anatomy at a medical school in San Francisco, and would revisit that area frequently until 1907.

After completing his basic studies, in 1869, he accompanied Eakins and the engraver, William Sartain, on a trip to Spain. He was very impressed, and remained there after his companions returned to Paris. He would stay for several years, mostly in Segovia and Granada, where he was especially fascinated by Moorish culture.

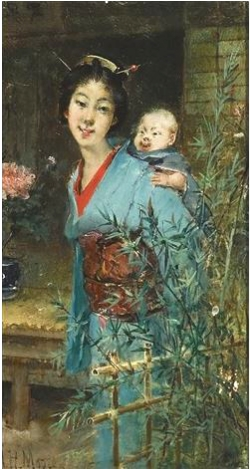
Japanese Mother and Child

In 1872, he married Isabella de Cistué y Nieto, from a prominent military family in Zaragoza, who knew sign-language because she had a childhood friend who was deaf. They went to live in Morocco, where they stayed for almost two years, travelling about painting; often with a military escort. He returned to New York in 1874 and opened a studio; participating in exhibitions at the National Academy of Design and the Pennsylvania Academy of the Fine Arts.

He also had two solo showings, in San Francisco, at the Snow & May Gallery and the Bohemian Club. It was there he met Katherine Birdsall Johnson (1834-1893), a philanthropist and art collector, who invited him and his wife to accompany her on a trip to Japan in 1880. He accepted, and became one of the first American artists to go there. He created over sixty paintings while visiting, which are now among his most familiar works.

He spent most of his later career painting portraits of children, wealthy Americans and members of the European nobility. Shortly after World War I, he went to live in Europe and died in Paris.
