= Brahim El Mazned =

Moroccan cultural manager and director of World Music festivals

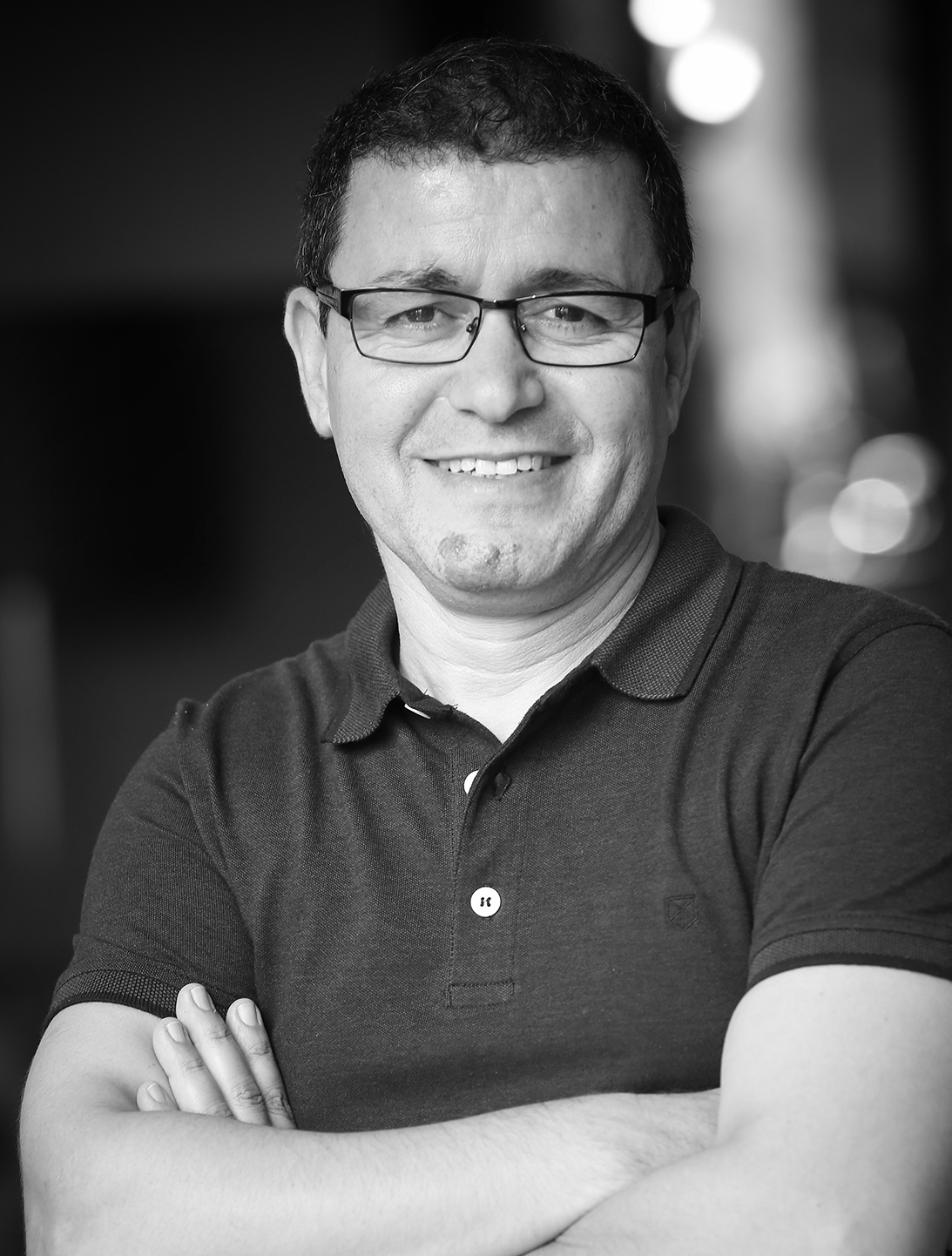
- Brahim El Mazned in 2016
- Born: 1971 (age 54–55); Essaouira, Morocco
- Education: Ibn Zohr University, Agadir
- Occupations: cultural manager and director of World Music festivals
- Known for: Festival Timitar, Visa for Music, expert for culture with UNESCO

Brahim El Mazned (born 31 December 1967 in Essaouira, Morocco) is a Moroccan cultural manager and director of World Music festivals, who works to develop popular musical activities around the world, with a focus on Moroccan and African culture. He is the founding director of cultural management organization Anya that promotes Moroccan and African cultural activities. Promoting Amazigh culture, El Mazned has served as the artistic director of the Timitar Festival of World Music in Agadir, Morocco. Further, he is the founding director of Visa for Music, the first festival and professional market for music in Africa and the Middle East.

== Career ==
=== National and international promotion of creative industries ===
With more than twenty-five years of experience in the Moroccan cultural world, El Mazned has become notable for the promotion of World Music as well as for the organization of major artistic and cultural events on an international level. He has served as a jury member for cultural events in Africa, Europe, Central Asia, Southeast Asia and South America. Further, he has hosted conferences, meetings, artistic residencies and cultural projects in more than 50 countries around the world.

In 2009, El Mazned was invited to manage the cultural preselection for the North Africa and Middle East region for the 6th Francophonie Games in Beirut, Lebanon. In the same capacity, he also worked for the 2013 edition of the games in Nice, France, and for the 2017 edition in Abidjan, Ivory Coast.

Member of the UE/UNESCO expert facility from 2019 to 2022, an international group of recognized experts with experience in designing and implementing policies to support cultural and creative activities, he has worked as consultant for UNESCO in the fields of cultural policy and creative industries.

In May 2026, El Mazned was named as the Deputy and Artistic Director of the Royal Theatre of Rabat.

=== Cultural events and networks ===
El Mazned is the artistic director of the Timitar Festival of World Music, created in 2004 in Agadir. This festival, mainly dedicated to Amazigh culture, has become one of the important events celebrating African musical traditions. For its 17th edition in 2022, the festival was attended by more than 380,000 spectators.

Over the years, El Mazned has initiated artistic residencies in several countries and regions around the world, including France, Spain, Greece, Réunion, New Caledonia, Madagascar, Mali, Tunisia, Mauritania, Lebanon and Brazil. Further, he has participated in the creation of a dozen albums and hundreds of concerts in festivals and venues in several countries.

Further, El Mazned is a member of several cultural institutions, including the European Forum of Worldwide Music Festivals (EFWMF), Hiba Foundation, All Africa Music Awards (AFRIMA) and the Global Music Market Network (GloMMnet). In 2016, he created MoMEx, an export office for the promotion of Moroccan music throughout the world.

=== Publishing ===
As producer of musical recordings, El Mazned works for the preservation and presentation of Morocco's intangible heritage, particularly for the musical arts of the Amazigh musical tradition of the Aïta and the Rrways musicians. For this, he founded the Atlas Azawan association and produced musical albums through his Anya cultural management company. Until 2022, he oversaw the artistic direction of the following three works: the anthology Chioukhs et Cheikhates de l'Aïta which received the Académie Charles Cros Prize in 2017. The anthology Rrways, a journey into the universe of itinerant Amazigh poet-singers was awarded another prize by the Académie Charles Cros in 2021 and with the Coup de cœur Musiques du monde Prize". In July 2022, he published the illustrated book The Art of the Rrways.

=== Visa For Music ===
In 2014, El Mazned became the founding director of Visa For Music, an important festival and professional market for music in Africa and the Middle East. This festival has since taken place every year in November in Rabat, the capital city of Morocco. It aims to promote musical creations and cultural diversity of both Moroccan and international artists with an African or Middle Eastern background.

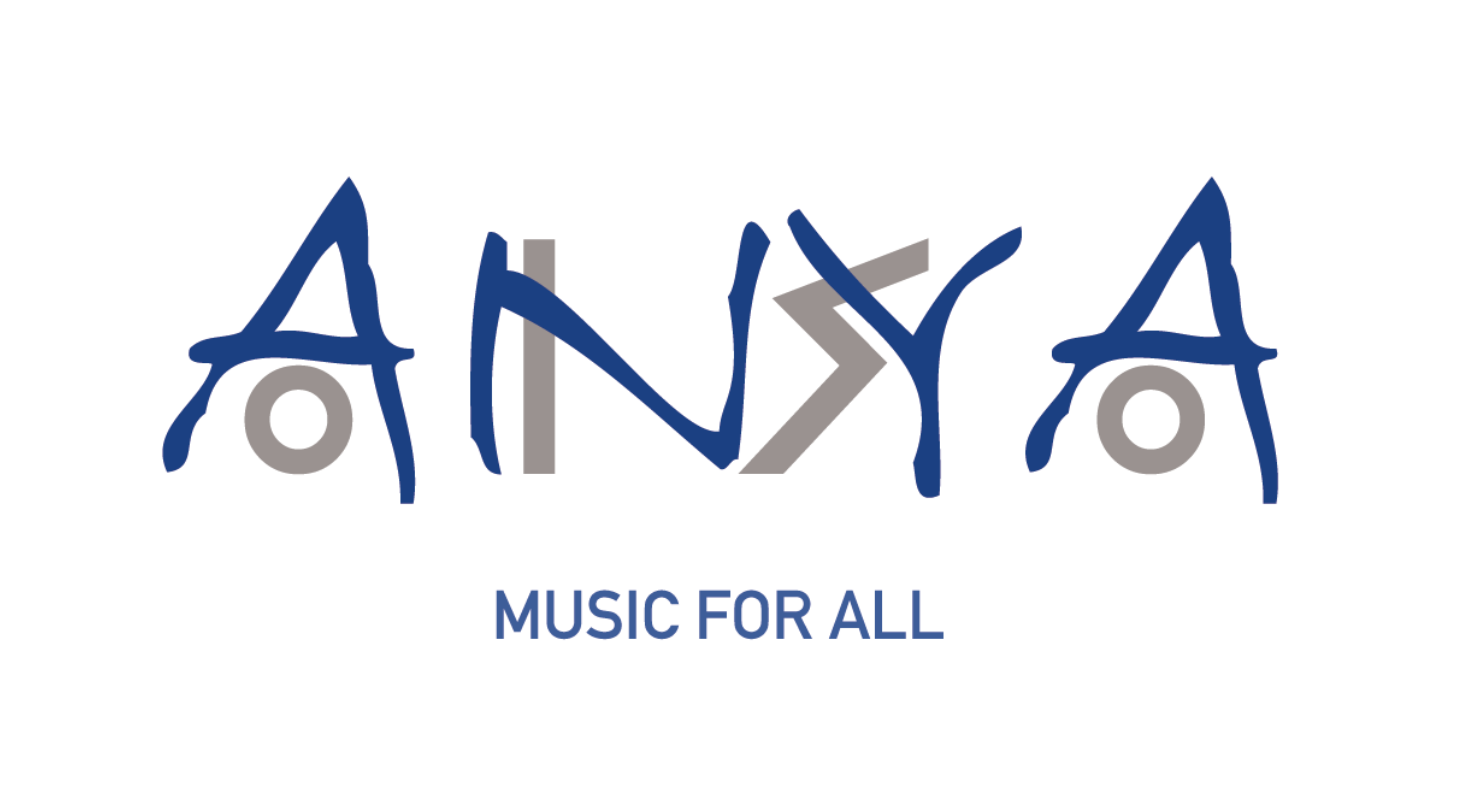
Logo of ANYA cultural agency

=== Anya cultural agency ===
Founded by Brahim El Mazned and under the direction of Keltouma Bakrimi, the mission of the Anya cultural agency is to participate in the restructuring of the value chain of the Moroccan music sector and to support artists and cultural operators in Morocco. The company has developed various projects of creation, distribution and promotion of music, for example the UNESCO project Jazz Women in Africa in 2021,Rési' Jazz and the Artistic Marathon.

== Awards and recognitions ==
El Mazned was featured as one of the hundred best leaders in sustainable cultural development in the guide for cultural diversity “Les Aventuriers de la Culture.” He also figured on the list of the hundred people who move and promote Morocco, a yearly list published by the Moroccan weekly magazine TelQuel. In addition, Brahim El Mazned was named in the book Those who inspire - Morocco as an inspiring personality of the Moroccan cultural sector.

== See also ==
- Music of Morocco
- List of cultural and regional genres of music
