= Visa for Music =

Performing arts festival in Morocco

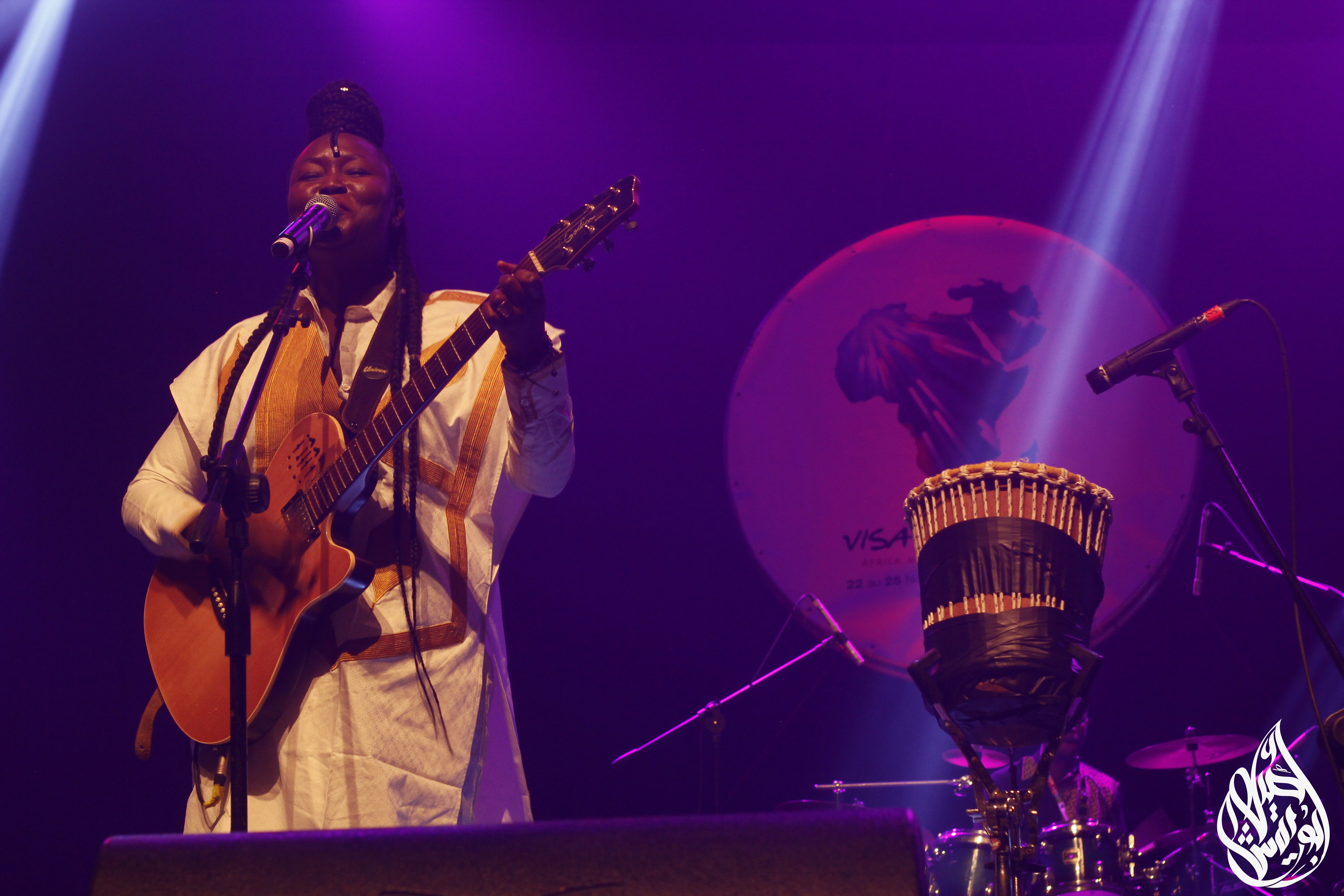
- Genre: World music, Afrobeat, Arabic music, Berber music, Jazz, Rap
- Dates: November of each year
- Locations: Rabat, Morocco
- Years active: since 2014
- Founders: Brahim El Mazned
- Website: Visa for Music

Visa for Music is a performing arts festival and professional marketplace for contemporary music from Africa and the Middle East. Its activities are addressing both professionals in the cultural and creative industries as well as the general public. For four days in November of each year, Visa for Music has been taking place since 2014 in Rabat, the capital of Morocco. Both applications by artists as well as numbers of professional attendees and public audiences have been increasing over the years, reaching more than 16,000 participants in 2022.

== History ==
Created in 2014 by Brahim El Mazned and the organization for cultural engineering Anya, the festival brings together African and Middle Eastern artists from all genres of contemporary world music. Its mission is first of all to participate in the development of the music market in Africa and beyond, to discover new talents and to promote the creation of partnerships. Further, it aims to provide a showcase and marketing opportunity for the benefit of artists and international cultural professionals. The Moroccan daily newspaper Le Matin said in March 2022 that "This festival is today a platform that promotes opportunities for exchange and contributes to the visibility and the place they deserve to artists from Africa and the Middle East". The event consists of two distinct parts, the festival and the market for professionals.

== The festival ==
Each year, a call for applications is published online, so that artists can register to participate in the festival. The applications are examined by the Visa for Music jury, made up each year of 5 different cultural actors, who select around thirty artists. Each artist or group performs for a showcase of about forty minutes in front of the festival audience. Around forty showcases take place each year, including artists from various music genres (global folk, urban music, electronic music, etc.) In 2023, more than 1500 artists of African or Middle Eastern origin applied, 71 of them living in the Americas, 244 in Europe, 158 in Asia, 1 in Australia, and 1031 in Africa.

The festival takes place in the Hassan district of Rabat and offers multiple activities spanning four days. Depending on each year's programme, Visa for Music has been presented in cultural venues such as the Theatre Mohamed V, the Renaissance Cinema, Café La Scène, Villa des Arts, the Cervantes Institute or the Institut francais of Rabat.

== The market for professionals ==
Visa for Music also includes a market for professional music promoters active in the development of African and Middle Eastern cultural and creative industries. Artists and professionals from the five continents have met at each edition for various activities: conferences, speed meetings and training sessions. This has provided opportunities to develop networks, present their projects and create partnerships. Further, the professional market also includes an exhibition space for around fifty exhibitors.

== Statistics ==
For the first five editions, Visa for Music attracted 64,000 spectators, 7,200 professionals, 1,500 artists, and 350 exhibitors. Also, it presented 250 showcases and 2,810 speed meetings. On average, 15,000 spectators and 1,000 professionals attend the festival each year. For the 2019 edition alone, more than 1000 professionals from more than 70 different countries participated in the activities throughout the event.

In 2020, like the rest of the world, Visa for Music had to face the COVID-19 pandemic and was prompted to present a digital edition, placed under the sign of resilience. The 2021 edition also was modified and mixed digital and live performances: the showcases were presented online, while the conferences were held face-to-face. The 2022 edition returned to its original live format to allow artists to reconnect with their audiences, and more than 16,000 spectators attended. The 2023 edition will celebrate the festival's 10th anniversary from November 22 to 25, 2023.

== See also ==
- African popular music
- Arabic popular music
- Berber music
