= Mahmoud Guinia =

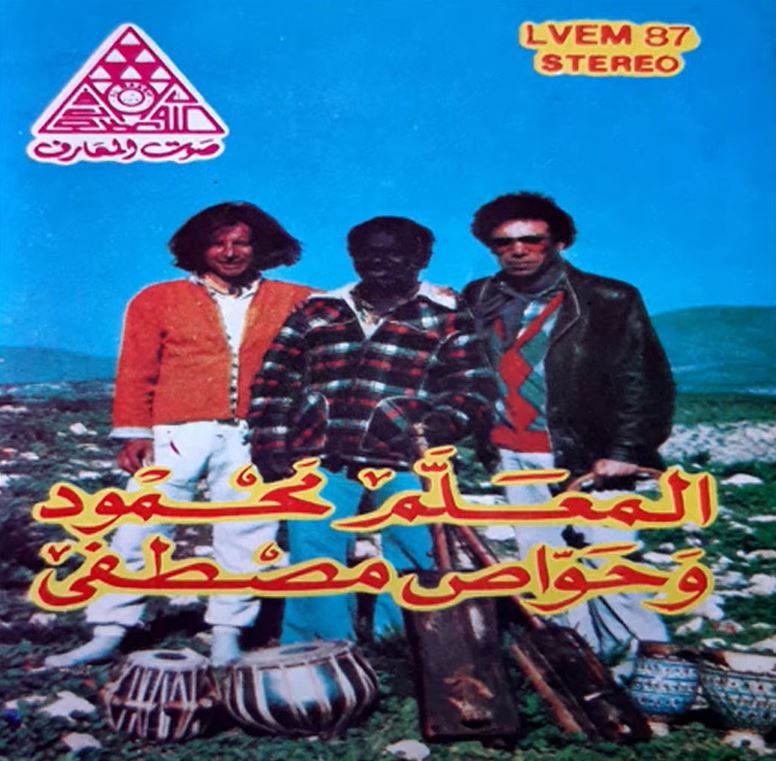

Background information
- Born: 1951; Essaouira, Morocco
- Origin: Morocco
- Died: 2 August 2015 (aged 64)
- Genre: Gnawa music
- Instruments: Guembri, Krakebs, Ganga

Mahmoud Guinia (Arabic: محمود ﯕينيا, and rarely ﯕنيا or کانية; also spelled Gania, Guinea or Khania; 1951 – 2 August 2015) was a Moroccan Gnawa musician, singer and guembri player, who was traditionally regarded as a Maâllem (معلم), i.e. master.

He recorded for both domestic and foreign labels, and collaborated with numerous western musicians.

== Life ==
Mahmoud Gania (or Guinia) was born in 1951 in the city Essaouira on the Atlantic coast. He was the second son of the master of Gnawa music, Maâllem Boubker Gania (1927–2000) and the famous clairvoyant and "moqaddema" A'isha Qabral. His brother Mokhtar Gania – as well as his late brothers Abdellah Gania and Bilal "Lahcen Zitoune" – is a gnawa Maâllem too, and their sister Zaida Gania – and the late Jmeia Gania – is another moqqaddema. Mahmoud Guinia was married to Mallika Al Machhour from Marrakesh, with whom he had two sons and a daughter.

Maâlem Mahmoud Gania (or Guinia) died after a lengthy illness on 2 August 2015.

His sons continue the tradition of the Saouiri style, notably Maâllem Houssam Guinia the youngest son, who is a rising star. His oldest son, Hamza Gania is a dancer and krakeb & tebel (ganga) player and works as a civil servant in Essaouira, while his daughter, Bouchra Gania is a student.

== Works ==
Mahmoud Guinia released numerous recordings, not all of which have been well documented. In the 1970s Moroccan music label Fikriphone released records of both live Lila ceremonies and studio sessions. In the following decades it was followed by Tichkaphone, whose materials were distributed in France by Sonodisc, and Agadir's La Voix El Maarif. There are also many cassettes released in Morocco.

The most famous western release, The Trance Of Seven Colors, was co-produced by Bill Laswell and Eric Rosenzveig in 1994 and featured the American saxophone player Pharoah Sanders along with family members of Mahmoud's ensemble including his brothers Mohktar and Abdellah. The ensemble included Abdellah "Gambori" Ahkaraz, now a maâlem and hadj from Essaouira as well. The Black Mluks was recorded and produced by Eric Rosenzveig in Montreal in 1992 at Radio Canada and released on P-Vine Records in Japan. Upon returning to Morocco with the master tapes, Mahmoud Gania sold the Moroccan rights to the cassette label Le Voix El Maarif (LVEM) who released it as El Maaleem Mahmoud Gania - Soiree Au Canada ("Maleem" was a misspelling of the word Maâlem meaning Master in Arabic on behalf of Bill Laswell and the Axiom label, which stuck with many in the West for years, believing that it was an actual first name). The recordings were part of the first trip Maâlem Mahmoud Guinia and his ensemble made out of Morocco, to perform at the Festival Musiques et Traditions du Monde, the 350th Anniversary of the City of Montreal.The group at this time consisted almost entirely of his brothers, nephews and other family members. It was a legendary group.

Later and for the rest of his life his two sons would play with their father from they were very small, culminating at the final concert at the annual gnawa festival in his native Essaouira in May 2015, when a very ill Maâllem Mahmoud Gania after an impressive concert handed his guimbri over to his young son, Maâlem Houssam Gania, who - together with younger brother Maâlem Mokhtar Gania - is considered his musical and spiritual heir.

Another notable release, The Wels Concert, with Peter Brötzmann and Hamid Drake, was recorded at Wels's 1996 Music Unlimited festival. The Shaman of the Sahara music recordings were released in 2001 with Maâllem Mahmoud Guinia in collaboration with Tata Guinness, Victor Vidal Paz and various Indonesian musicians.

In September 2017 his final studio recordings (recorded in 2013 at Plein Les Oreilles studios in Casablanca with producer Ali Faraoui) were released on double vinyl by UK record label, Hive Mind Records. The remastered album is titled Colours of the Night. In 2020, Hive Mind issued a second Gania album titled Aicha.

== See also ==
- Music of Morocco
