= Paradise Bangkok Molam International Band =

- Genres: Folk, World, Blues & Country
- Years active: 2012 to present
- Members: Chris Menist; Kammao Perdtanon; Maft Sai; Phusana Treeburut; Piyanart Jotikasthira; Sawai Kaewsombat

The Paradise Bangkok Molam International Band is a hybridized roots music band from Thailand. Their musical style is a mixture of traditional Thai music, particularly molam music. There are also elements of blues, folk rock and dub. They have appeared at various international concerts.

== Background ==
The formation of the band came about as a result of a DJ project in a bid to bring back to life Thai sounds deemed lost. While an unknown act in their country, they released their debut album 21st Century Molam. Their second album was Planet Lam. The album was released on 21 October 2016. It has been said that the inspiration for the album came from a club owned by label co-owner Maft Sai. It had the same name.

== Live performances ==
They have appeared in Bucharest in an event organized by online music magazine, The Attic. The other various festivals they have appeared at include the Off Festival in Poland and Festival Mundial in the Netherlands, as well as the Glastonbury and Field Day festivals in the UK.

== Discography ==
Singles
Title	Release info	Year	F	Notes
"Roob Lor Pu Tai" / "Pu Tai Dub" (Manasseh's Molam Version)	Studio Lam SL001	2014	7"	Side B Remix Nick Manasseh
"Roob Lor Pu Tai" (Rootikal Re-Rub) / "Roob Lor Pu Tai" (Rootikal Re-Dub)	Studio Lam SL002	2014	7"	
"Kwang Noi Chaolay", "Kwang Noi Chaolay" (Manasseh's Disco Dub) / "Sao Sakit Mae" (Rabih Beaini's Molam Variation)	Studio Lam SL003	2015	12"	A2 Remix Nick Manasseh; B1 Remix Rabih Beaini
"Lam San Ra" / "Lam San Ra" (Nick Manasseh Version)	Studio Lam SL004	2015	12"	

Albums
Title	Release info	Year	F
21st Century Molam	Studio Lam SLLP001	2014	LP
21st Century Molam	Studio Lam SLCD001	2014	CD
Planet Lam	Studio Lam SLLP002	2016	LP
Planet Lam	Studio Lam SLCD002	2016	CD
Araya Lam	ZudRangMa ZRMLP007	2023	LP
Araya Lam	ZudRangMa ZRMLP007	2026	LP

== Various artist compilations ==
- Top of the World – Songlines CD 106 – 2015 – Featured song: "Show Wong Molam International"
