= The Attic (magazine) =

Online music magazine

- Website type: Online magazine
- Headquarters: Bucharest, Romania; Oslo, Norway
- Founder: Dragoș Rusu
- Website: theatticmag.com
- Launched: December 19, 2014

The Attic is an online music magazine. The magazine has branches in Bucharest, Romania, and Oslo, Norway, and additional mobile offices in various European countries. The magazine focuses on a wide variety of music genres, and also features editorial investigation concerning different world cultures. The magazine has also been involved in organizing significant musical events including the Outernational Days festival and other events in the capital. The magazine has been referenced in several Romanian magazines including Dilema veche and România liberă, British pop culture magazine The Quietus, and the British avant-garde music magazine The Wire.

== Background ==
Dragoș Rusu is the magazine's editor in chief. The magazine had its launch party at clubul Control din București (Control club in Bucharest) on December 19, 2014. The magazine features music from various genres and times.

== Activities ==
The magazine has organized music concerts with world music acts, including Senyawa (from Indonesia), Praed (from Lebanon), and the Thai music group, Paradise Bangkok International Molam Band. In 2015 it contributed an article to Kaput Magazine in an editorial exchange.
