= Gnawa music =

Moroccan music genre and type of dance

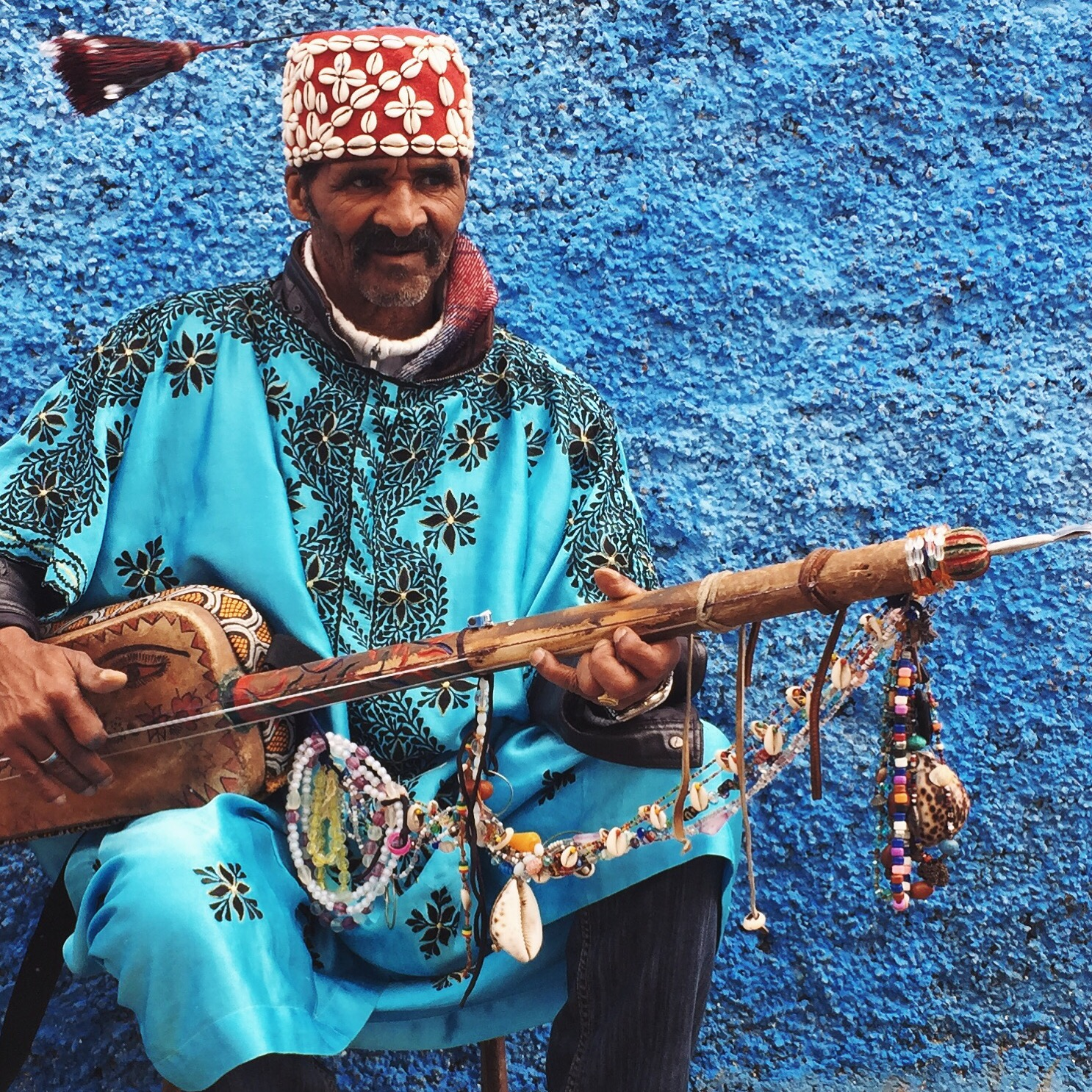
- A gnawa street performer wearing traditional gnawi clothing in Rabat's Qasbat al-Widaya
- Native name: ڭْناوة or كْناوة
- Stylistic origins: Moroccan music

Gnawa
- UNESCO Intangible Cultural Heritage
- Country: Morocco
- Reference: 01170
- Region: Arab States

Inscription history
- Inscription: 2019 (14th session)
- List: Representative

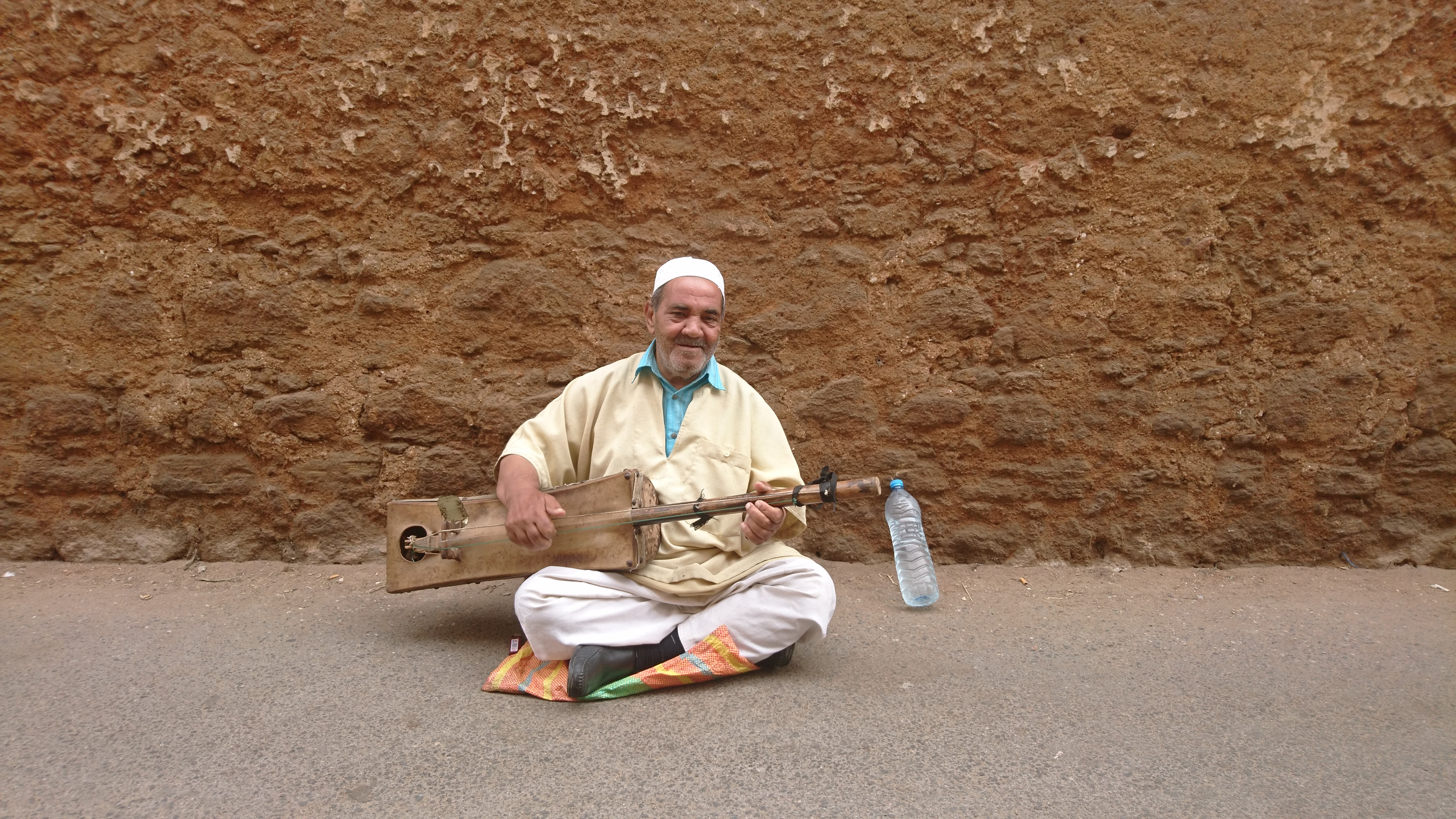
Gnawa singer in Salé, Morocco

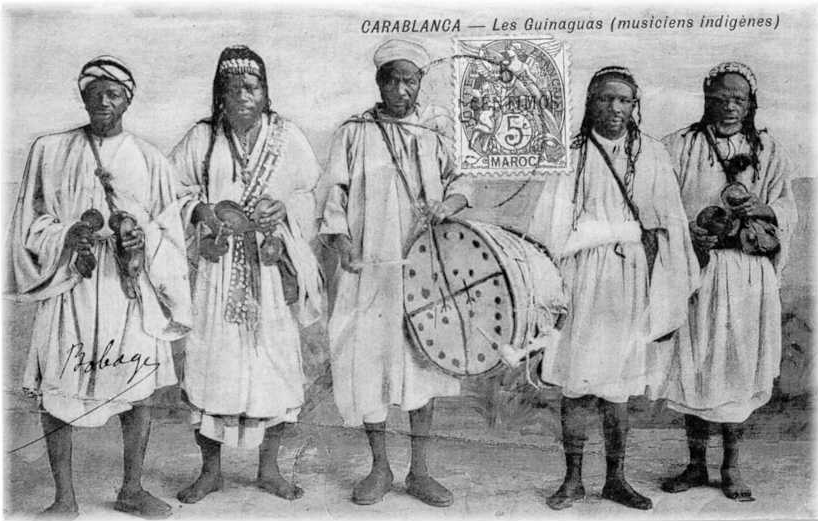
French postcard of the Gnawa people titled "Les Guinaguas, musiciens indigènes" (The Guinaguas, indigenous musicians) in Casablanca, Morocco. Produced by Ed. J. Gonzalez & Cie.

Gnawa music (Ar. ڭْناوة or كْناوة) is a body of Moroccan religious songs and rhythms. Emerging in the 16th and 17th centuries, Gnawa music developed through the cultural fusion of West Africans brought to Morocco, notably the Hausa, Fulani, and Bambara peoples, whose presence and heritage are reflected in the songs and rituals. Its well-preserved heritage combines ritual poetry with traditional music and dancing. The music is performed at lila, communal nights of celebration dedicated to prayer and healing guided by the Gnawa maalem, or master musician, and their group of musicians and dancers. Though many of the influences that formed this music can be traced to West African kingdoms, its traditional practice is concentrated in Morocco. Gnawa music has spread to many other countries in Africa and Europe, such as France.

The origins of Gnawa music are intricately associated with that of the famed royal "Black Guard" of Morocco.

== Etymology ==
The name Gnawa originated in the indigenous languages of North Africa and the Sahara Desert. According to the grammatical principles of Berber, the term appears as is agnaw in the singular and ignawen in the plura, meaning "black person." In the Sanhaja language, the term also derives from the root 'gnw', meaning "black". The term Gnawa is transcribed as the words "Knawi" or "Jnawi", linking its origin to the name Guinea and the historical regions of West Africa. In Berber 'akal niguinamen' (singular - 'aguinaw') means the 'land of the black men', historically associated with the Ghana Empire.

== History ==
Gnawa music emerged in Morocco from traditions of enslaved West Africans displaced through the trans-Saharan slave trade between the 11^{th} and 17^{th} centuries. More specifically, the Gnawa population originates from a broad region extending from Senegal to Chad and from Mali to Southern Nigeria. The displacement created an important community with a distinct diasporic identity in Morocco.

As an enslaved group, the Gnawa music preserves the memory of slavery in Morocco; the music clearly mentions words of "abduction, suffering and privation". The community preserves its identity, cultural memory and religious rituals in their artistic expression; some West African words and phrases remain in Gnawa songs today. The metallic sounds and percussions of the Gnawa rites, as well as the rituals of Lila and Dederba, hold a quasi-liturgical status within the community.

The documentary "Gwana - The Music of Slaves" interviews members of the Ghania family, who are members of the Gnawa community and mention their ethnic roots in Mali, while insisting that they are Moroccan and Muslim. The Gnawa do not desire a return to their homeland; the diaspora in Morocco is rooted in Islamic culture. The diaspora's conversion to Islam has allowed their integration into the new homeland of Morocco. The Gnawa people identify as Moroccan and Muslim first, and then, secondarily, as participants of the tradition from their sub-Saharan origins.

== Music ==
In a Gnawa song, one phrase or a few lines are repeated over and over, so the song may last a long time. In fact, a song may last several hours non-stop. However, what seems to the uninitiated to be one long song is actually a series of chants describing the various spirits (in Arabic mlouk (sing. melk), so what seems to be a 20-minute piece may be a whole series of pieces – a suite for Sidi Moussa, Sidi Hamou, Sidi Mimoun or others. Because they are suited for adepts in a state of trance, they go on and on, and have the effect of provoking a trance from different angles.

The melodic language of the stringed instrument is closely related to their vocal music and to their speech patterns, as is the case in much African music. It is a language that emphasizes the tonic and fifth, with quavering pitch-play, especially pitch-flattening, around the third, the fifth, and sometimes the seventh.

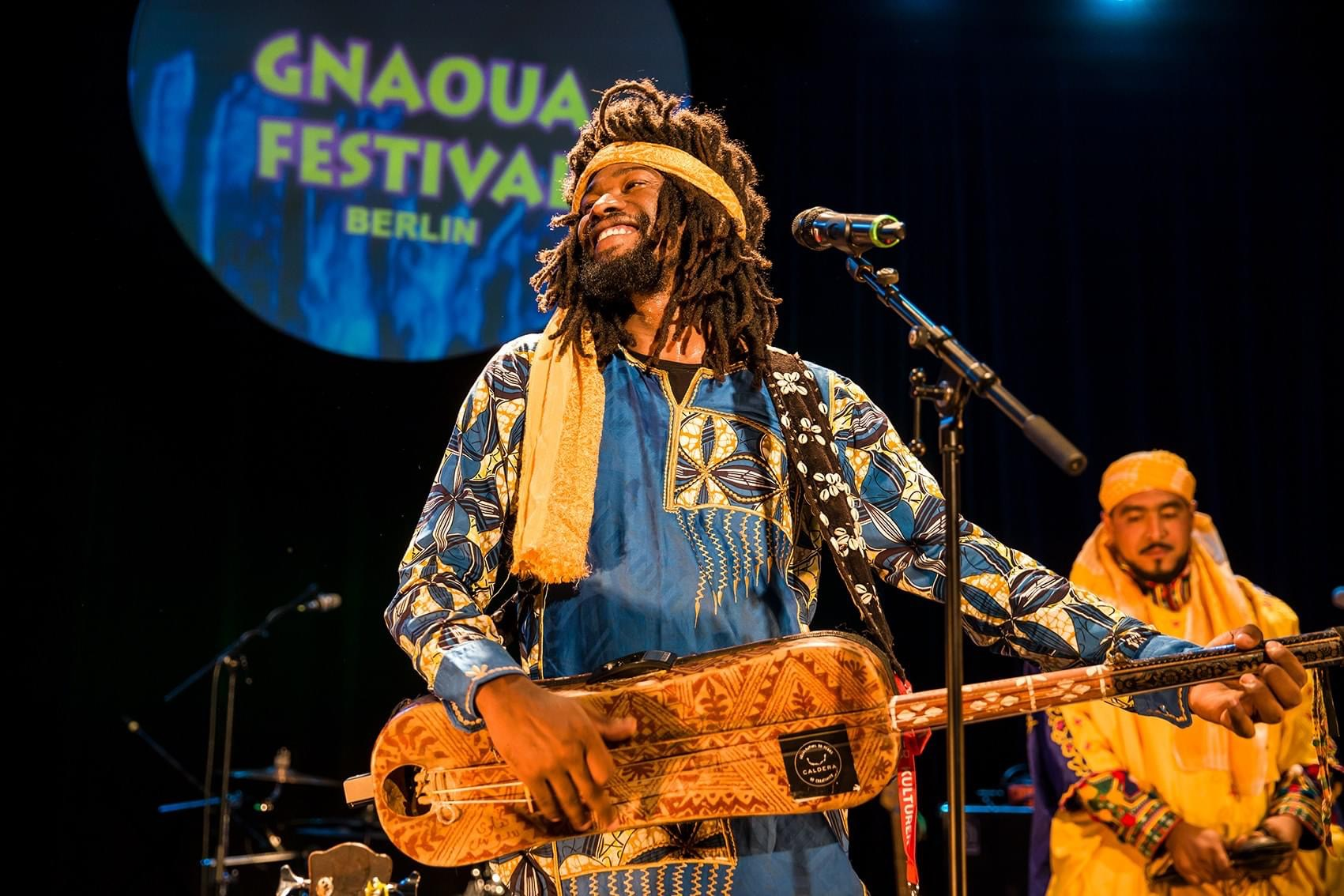
Mehdi Qamoum playing the Guembri

Gnawa music is characterized by instrumentation. The large, heavy iron castanets known as qraqab or krakeb and a three-string lute known as a hajhuj, guembri or gimbri, or sentir, are central to Gnawa music. The hajhuj has strong historical and musical links to West African lutes like the Hausa halam, a direct ancestor of the banjo.

The rhythms of the Gnawa, like their instruments, are distinctive. Gnawa is particularly characterized by interplay between triple and duple meters. The "big bass drums" mentioned by Schuyler are not typically featured in a more traditional setting.

Gnawa have venerable stringed-instrument traditions involving both bowed lutes like the gogo and plucked lutes like the hajhuj. The Gnawa also use large drums called tbel in their ritual music.

Gnawa hajhuj players use a technique which 19th century American minstrel banjo instruction manuals identify as "brushless drop-thumb frailing". The "brushless" part means the fingers do not brush several strings at once to make chords. Instead, the thumb drops repeatedly in a rhythmic pattern against the freely vibrating bass string, producing a throbbing drone, while the first two or three fingers of the same (right) hand pick out percussive patterns in a drum-like, almost telegraphic, manner. The hajhuj players add elaborate embellishments to the basic chord notes by plucking or pressing the strings of the instrument's neck with their left hand fingers, often used in the slower passages of the music.

== Rituals ==
Gnawas perform a complex liturgy, called lila or derdeba. The ceremony recreates the first sacrifice and the genesis of the universe by the evocation of the seven main manifestations of the divine demiurgic activity. It calls the seven saints and mluk, represented by seven colors, as a prismatic decomposition of the original light/energy. The derdeba is jointly animated by a maâlem (master musician) at the head of his troop and by a moqadma or shuwafa (clairvoyant) who is in charge of the accessories and clothing necessary to the ritual.

The ceremony starts when the krakeb players begin clapping in continuous rhythmic patterns while singing "short call-response refrains". The clairvoyant determines the accessories and clothing as it becomes ritually necessary. Meanwhile, the maâlem, using the guembri (box-shaped lute) and burning incense, calls the saints and supernatural entities to present themselves in order to take possession of the followers, who devote themselves to ecstatic dancing.

Inside the brotherhood, each group (zriba; Arabic: زريبة) gets together with an initiatory moqadma (Arabic: مقدمة), the priestess that leads the ecstatic dance called the jedba (Arabic: جذبة), and with the maâlem, who is accompanied by several players of krakeb.

Preceded by an animal sacrifice that assures the presence of the spirits, the all-night ritual typically lasting from late evening until sunrise begins with an opening that consecrates the space, the aâda ("habit" or traditional norm; Arabic: عادة), during which the musicians perform a swirling acrobatic dance while playing the krakeb.

The mluk are entities drawn from Islamic figures, historical saints and jinn (genie spirits). The participants enter a trance state (jedba) in which they may perform spectacular dances. Through these dances, participants negotiate their relationships with the mluk either appeasing them if they have been offended or strengthening an existing bond. The mluk are evoked by seven musical patterns, seven melodic and rhythmic cells, who set up the seven suites that form the repertoire of dance and music of the Gnawa ritual. During these seven suites, seven different types of incense are burned and the dancers are covered by veils of seven different colours.

Each of the seven families of mluk is populated by many characters identifiable by the music and by the footsteps of the dance. Each mluk is accompanied by its specific colour, incense, rhythm and dance. These entities, treated like "presences" (called hadra, Arabic: حضرة) that the consciousness meets in ecstatic space and time, are related to mental complexes, human characters, and behaviors. The aim of the ritual is to reintegrate and to balance the main powers of the human body, made by the same energy that supports the perceptible phenomena and divine creative activity.

Later, the guembri opens the treq ("path," Arabic: طريق), the strictly encoded sequence of the ritual repertoire of music, dances, colors and incenses, that guides in the ecstatic trip across the realms of the seven mluk, until the renaissance in the common world, at the first lights of dawn.

Almost all Moroccan brotherhoods, such as the Issawa or the Hamadsha, relate their spiritual authority to a saint. The ceremonies begin by reciting that saint's written works or spiritual prescriptions (hizb, Arabic: حزب) in Arabic. In this way, they assert their role as spiritual descendants of the founder, giving themselves the authority to perform the ritual. Gnawa, whose ancestors were neither literate nor native speakers of Arabic, begin the lila by recalling through song and dance their origins, the experiences of their slave ancestors, and ultimately redemption.

== Gnawa music today ==
During the last few decades, Gnawa music has been modernizing and thus become more profane. However, there are still many privately organized lilas that conserve the music's sacred, spiritual status.

Within the framework of the Gnaoua World Music Festival of Essaouira ("Gnaoua and Musics of the World"), the Gnawa play in a profane context with slight religious or therapeutic dimensions. Instead, in this musical expression of their cultural art, they share stages with other musicians from around the world. As a result, Gnawa music has taken a new direction by fusing its core spiritual music with genres like jazz, blues, reggae, and hip-hop. For four days every June, the festival welcomes musicians that come to participate, exchange and mix their own music with Gnawa music, creating one of the largest public festivals in Morocco. Since its debut in 1998, the free concerts have drawn an audience that has grown from 20,000 to over 200,000 in 2006, including 10,000 visitors from around the world.

Past participants have included Randy Weston, Adam Rudolph, The Wailers, Pharoah Sanders, Keziah Jones, Byron Wallen, Omar Sosa, Doudou N'Diaye Rose, and the Italian trumpet player Paolo Fresu.

There are also projects such as "The Sudani Project", a jazz/gnawa dialogue between saxophonist/composer Patrick Brennan, Gnawi maâlem Najib Sudani, and drummer/percussionist/vocalist Nirankar Khalsa. Brennan has pointed out that the metal qraqeb and gut bass strings of the guembri parallel the cymbal and bass in jazz sound.

In the 1990s, young musicians from various backgrounds and nationalities started to form modern Gnawa bands. Gnawa Impulse from Germany, Mehdi Qamoum aka Medicament (The cure) from Morocco, Bab L' Bluz with members from France and Morocco, and Gnawa Diffusion from Algeria are some examples. These groups offer a rich mix of musical and cultural backgrounds, fusing their individual influences into a collective sound. They have woven elements of rap, reggae, jazz, blues, rock and rai into a vibrant musical patchwork.

These projects incorporating Gnawa and Western musicians are essentially Gnawa fusions. Ensemble Saha Gnawa describes itself as "North African futurism," combining Gnawa with jazz and contemporary music.

== UNESCO recognition ==
In 2018, Morocco submitted a nomination for Gnawa to UNESCO's Intangible Cultural Heritage of Humanity list. On December 12, 2019, Gnawa was officially inscribed at UNESCO's 14th session held in Bogotá, Colombia. The committee noted that Gnawa gives its followers a sense of identity and community. Its rhythms and practices bring groups from various parts of Morocco together, reinforcing social links and communities. UNESCO also noted that the tradition is well preserved and effectively transmitted across generations, and that its recognition could encourage other communities worldwide to safeguard similar cultural heritage.

== List of Gnawa maâlems ==
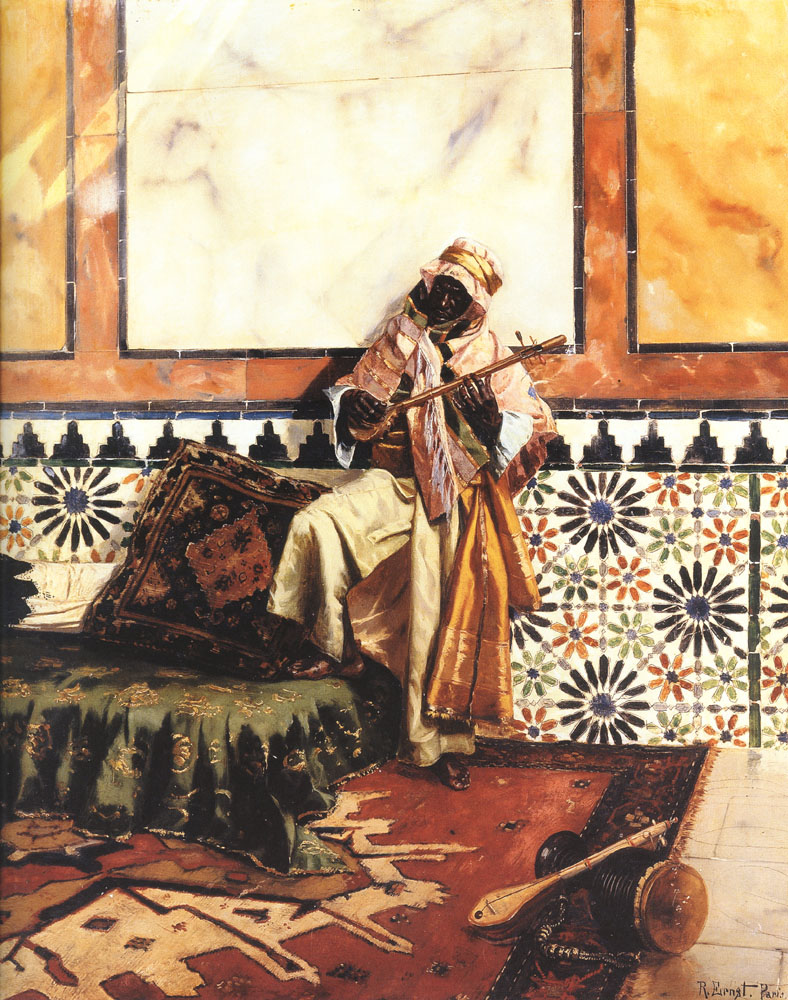
A 19th century Gnawa musician, painting by Austro-French Rudolf Ernst (1854–1932)

- Mahmoud Guinia ("the King") or Gania – Moroccan musician (b. 1951, d. August 2, 2015). He played with Pharoah Sanders and Carlos Santana, among many others. Guitarist Jimi Hendrix spent a few months in his house in Essaouira to take lessons. He is the son of the late Maâllem Boubker Gania, and his two brothers Abdelah and Mokhtar are also distinguished maâllemin. The Gania family also includes Zaida Gania, a very popular medium and clairvoyant at the nights of trance (leelas) as well as the head of a group of female gnawas, The Haddarate of Essaouira.
- Brahim Belkane ("The traditionalist") – He has played with Led Zeppelin, Robert Plant, Adam Rudolph, Randy Weston, and Jimmy Page. He says: "There are many colours on earth: red, green, blue, yellow. You have to find these when you play, to be bright like the sun."
- Hamid El Kasri – He now lives in Rabat but his origins are in the northern town Ksar El Kbir, thus the nickname Kasri (i.e. the one from Ksar). He is one of the biggest stars on stage and is particularly renowned in Morocco for his voice. In his youth Hamid was associated with the gnawa scene in Tangier and masters such as Abdelwahab "Stitou". He began his apprenticeship at the age of seven. He fuses the music of the north with that of the south: gharbaoui from Rabat, marsaoui from Essaouira and soussi or Berber from the south of Morocco. He has played with Jacob Collier and Snarky Puppy.
- H'mida Boussou ("The grand master") – As a child, H'mida immersed himself in Gnawi culture as taught to him by the Maâlem Ahmed Oueld Dijja, and became a maâlem himself at the age of 16. He also worked with Maâlem Sam from 1962 to 1968. Maalem H'mida Boussou died on 17 February 2007, but his son, Maalem Hassan Boussou continues the tradition and played a concert in homage to his late father at the 10th Essaouira Gnaoua and World Music Festival in June 2007.
- Chérif Regragui ("The communicator") – He became a maâlem by the age of 18. He worked with Tayeb Saddiki in theatre and he was behind the group Taghada.
- Mahjoub Khalmous – His skills took him to many festivals in Europe. In 1993 he formed his own group and became a maâlem. He has worked for several years with Bertrand Hell, head of the anthropology department at Besançon University in France.
- Allal Soudani ("The dreamer") – His grandparents M'Barkou and Barkatou were brought from Sudan (West Africa) as slaves. "When I play I no longer feel my body, I empty myself. And when I reach the state of trance I become nothing more than a leaf on a tree blowing at the mercy of the wind," he says, describing his trance moments.
- Abdellah El Gourd – He learned Gnawa music as a young man while working as a radio engineer in his hometown of Tangier. He has collaborated with jazz musicians Randy Weston and Archie Shepp and blues musician Johnny Copeland. With Weston, he co-produced The Splendid Master Gnawa Musicians of Morocco, which received a 1996 Grammy Award nomination for Best World Music Album.
- Omar Hayat ("The showman") – He was taught by Mahmoud Guinea and the late Maâllem Ahmed. He formed his own group in 1991. His style is particularly influenced by reggae, but Omar Hayat nonetheless plays true gnawa and is a source of inspiration for the young gnaoui in Essaouira. He participated at the festival of Avignon and has also been working and touring with the German circus Afrika! Afrika!
- Abelkebir Merchane (also known as Cheb) – He is from an Arab family, none of whom are gnawa. His style is a mixture of marsaoui (Essaouira) and Marrakchi (Marrakesh). He was taught by Maâllem Layaachi Baqbou. His son Hicham is also a gnawa master.
- Abdeslam Alikkane and Tyour gnawa – He is a Berber from the region of Agadir. He learned to play the krakeb at the age of nine. He is particularly interested in the healing aspect of gnawa. He has performed at many international festivals, playing with Peter Gabriel, Gilberto Gil (former Brazil's minister of Culture) and Ray Lema.
- Abderrahman Paco – He is one a founding member of the group Nass El Ghiwane. In 1966 he briefly joined the Living Theatre, then two years later met Jimi Hendrix.
- Mohamed Kouyou – In 1984 he played at the opening of the Moroccan Pavilion at Disney World. He also plays in Essaouira's gnawa festival.
- Mokhtar Gania – Son of Maâlem Boubker. He is the younger brother of Mahmoud. He played at the Roskilde Festival in Denmark in 2003, sharing the stage with Bill Laswell, Jah Wobble, Gigi, Sussan Deyhim and others.
- Mohamed Daoui – He teaches the younger generation of future maâlems, for which he has a widespread reputation.
- Abdelkader Benthami – He owes his education to maâlems such as Zouitni. He lives in Casablanca, and showed his strength on albums such as Bill Laswell's Night Spirit Masters. His sons are both masters, and the youngest, Abderrahim, debuted in 2007 at the Festival d'Essaouira.
- Si Mohamed Ould Lebbat – At the age of 18 he began to play with Maâlem Sam, whom he accompanied to festivals in France.
- Ahmed Bakbou – He has worked with maâlems including Ba Ahmed Saasaa, El Hachimi Ould Mama, Homan Ould el Ataar, and Si Mohamed Ould el Fernatchi. He is the first son of Maâllem Layaachi Baqbou, and he is known as "the talking gimbri". Although he sings, he often plays the gimbri with close friends such as Abdelkebir Merchane or his brothers Moustapha and Aziz singing.
- Essaïd Bourki – His origins are in the south of Morocco. He performed with his group in Belgium in 1990.
- Abdellah Guinea ("The Marley") – He became a maâlem at the age of 16. His nickname is due to his dreadlocks and fondness for reggae. He is the middle son of Maâllem Boubker Gania.
- Mohamed Chaouki – Formerly a horse trainer who worked in the stud farms of Rabat. At the age of 19 he became a maâlem. He formed a group with his brother, sons and nephews with whom he has performed in Europe 18 times.
- Saïd Boulhimas – He was the youngest Gnawi to play at the 7th (2004) gnawa festival. Saïd was taught by Abdelah Gania and is almost considered the son of the maâllem. He won the Festival de Jeunes Talents (Festival of young talents) in 2006 and is part of the French/Moroccan Band Of Gnawa with Louis Bertignac and Loy Erlich.
- Hassan Hakmoun – By the age of four, he was performing alongside snake charmers and fire-breathers on Marrakesh streets. His mother is known throughout the city as a mystic healer. He worked with Peter Gabriel. He is currently based in New York City.
- Maalem Hassan Benjaafar travelled throughout Morocco as a youth, learning from Maalems in every region, including Maalem Sam of Casablanca, Maalem Ahmed Bakbou and Maalem Abdelatif of Marrakesh, Maalem Boujmaa of Fes, Maalem Abdelouahed Stitu and Maalem Mbarek Kasri of Tangier, and Maalem Hmida Boussou of Marrakesh and Casablanca. While still a teenager, he was accorded the title of Maalem. He came to the USA as the leader of a band of 10 Gnawa musicians sponsored by the Moroccan government. After his arrival he played and recorded with jazz great Randy Weston and Balkan Beat Box. Now based in New York City, Maalem Benjaafar is the leader of the Grammy nominated band Innov Gnawa and co-leader, along with drummer Daniel Freedman, of Saha Gnawa, which integrates Gnawa with jazz and contemporary music. Both Innov Gnawa and Saha Gnawa perform in the USA and internationally'
- Fath-Allah Cherquaoui (Fath-Allah Laghrizmi) – One of the youngest Masters of Gnawa music, Fath-Allah was born in 1984 into a well-known family in Marrakesh, Morocco. His eyes were opened to the ceremonies of Gnawa music by his grandmother, Lmqadma Lhouaouia. As a Moqadma or Shuwafa (clairvoyant), she would organize the Gnawa ceremony, or derdeba, two or three times a year with a renowned Master named Lmansoum. Thus, the entire family, including young children, developed a deep appreciation and interest in this genre of spiritual music. By the age of 19, his elder cousin, Maallem Lahouaoui, became a Master and began to play in the ceremonies for their grandmother. At seven years old, Fath-Allah was able to sing nearly all of the ritual repertoire, and play the qraqeb (iron castanets). By the age of eleven, he decided to build his own version of the instrument known as the gembry, using a glow bin, a broom handle, and an electric cable for strings. Five years later, he and his younger brother purchased their first gembry, and he began learning and practicing finger placement, as well as how to distinguish the correct tones. Although his father advised him to spend more time on his schoolwork, and cautioned him against the dangers and hardships of the music industry, Fath-Allah remained dedicated to teaching himself the instruments and music of Gnawa. After some time, he was invited to join his cousin Maallem Lahouaoui's band, playing the castanets, dancing and singing. But he dreamed of playing the gembry in a real derdeba. His chance finally came on a night when his cousin asked him to stand in for him and finish playing what was left of the ceremonial songs. It was the first time Fath-Allah had ever played in front of a crowd, and during an actual Gnawa ceremony. The audience was amazed at how the youngest member of the band could so easily replace the Master, and actually play as well as he and many other Masters. This was the beginning of the Maallem Fath-Allah. His favourite Masters include: Maallem Lahouaoui, Maallem Mustapha Baqbou, Maallem Hmida Boussou and Maallem Abd Elkader Amil
- Mohamed Errebbaa One of the youngest masters, originally from Rabat, he started at a young age when he moved to Casablanca and grew up attending ceremonies of great masters such as Maalem Hmida boussou, Maalem Abdelkader Benthami. He spent many years learning with different masters such as Maalem Abderrahim Benthami and Maalem Said Oughassal before he moved to Essaouira and spent a few years with Maalem Mokhtar Gania. Mohamed has always worked on different types of music and collaborations besides his traditional ceremonies.He moved to the UK in 2020 and is based in Bristol.
