= Michael White (violinist) =

American jazz violinist (1930–2016)

Michael Walter White (24 May 1930 – 6 December 2016) was an American jazz violinist.

== Life and career ==
White was born in Houston, Texas, and grew up in Oakland, California, taking up the violin when he was six years old. His initial career break occurred in 1965, when he played with the John Handy Quintet at the Monterey Jazz Festival, and subsequently recorded three albums with Handy. White was among the first to play the violin in avant-garde jazz, and in the late 1960s became one of the first jazz violinists to play jazz rock fusion (with his band The Fourth Way). During his career, he played with musicians such as Sun Ra, Prince Lasha, McCoy Tyner, Eric Dolphy, Wes Montgomery, Pharoah Sanders, Kenny Dorham, Joe Henderson, John Lee Hooker, and Richard Davis. In early 2007, The Michael White Quintet's "Mechanical Man" won in the 6th Annual Independent Music Awards for Best Jazz Song.

White eventually settled in Los Angeles, California. After a long period of obscurity, in the mid 1990s he was involved in a reunion of the Handy Quintet and recorded an album as co-leader with Bill Frisell, Motion Pictures (1997). In 2006 White released the album Voices.

He died on December 6, 2016.

== Discography ==
=== As leader ===
- 1971: Spirit Dance (Impulse!)
- 1972: Pneuma (Impulse!)
- 1973: The Land of Spirit and Light (Impulse!)
- 1974: Father Music, Mother Dance (Impulse!)
- 1974: Go with the Flow (Impulse!)
- 1978: The X Factor (Elektra Records)
- 1979: White Night (Elektra)
- 1997: Motion Pictures (Intuition)
- 2006: Voices (Izniz)

=== As sideman ===
With John Handy

- Recorded Live at the Monterey Jazz Festival (Columbia, 1966)
- Projections (Columbia, 1968)

With John Lee Hooker

- Never Get Out of These Blues Alive (ABC, 1972)
- Free Beer and Chicken (ABC, 1974)

With The Fourth Way

- The Fourth Way (Capitol Records, 1969)
- The Sun and Moon Have Come Together (1970, Harvest Records)
- Werewolf (Harvest, 1970)

With Sonny Simmons

- Manhattan Egos (Arhoolie, 1969 & 2000)
- Burning Spirits (Contemporary, 1971)

With The Dead Science

- Submariner (2003)
- Bird Bones in the Bughouse (2004)

With Pharoah Sanders

- Thembi (Impulse!, 1971)
- Elevation (Impulse!, 1973)
- Message from Home (Verve, 1996)

With Alice Coltrane

- John Coltrane: Infinity (1972)

With McCoy Tyner

- Song for My Lady (1973)

With Joe Henderson

- The Elements (Milestone, 1973)
