= J. Mora Moss House =

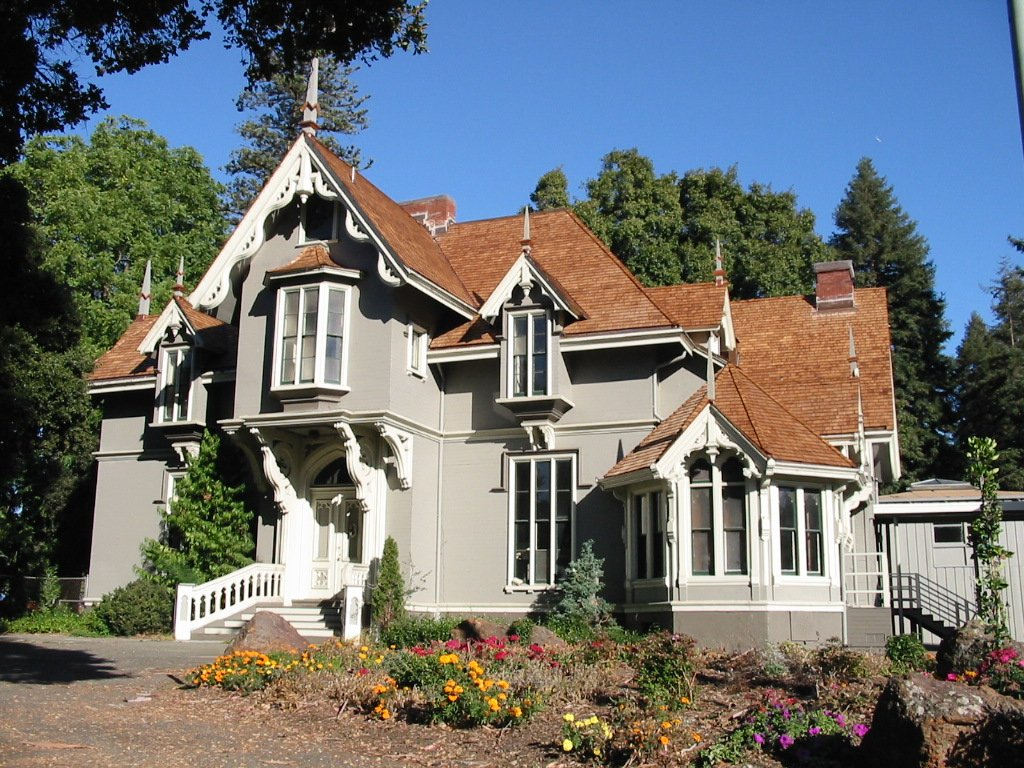

General information
- Architectural style: Carpenter Gothic—Victorian
- Location: Oakland, California, United States
- Coordinates: 37.8238°N 122.2606°W
- Construction started: 1864
- Completed: 1865
- Cost: more than US$14,500
- Client: Joseph Moravia Moss

Technical details
- Structural system: pine framing, redwood planking
- Size: 5,500 square feet (510 m^{2})

Design and construction
- Architect: S. H. Williams

J. Mora Moss House is a boldly romantic Carpenter Gothic style Victorian home located within Mosswood Park in Oakland, California. It was built in 1864, bought by Oakland in 1912 and documented by the Historic American Buildings Survey in 1960 at which point it was pronounced "One of the finest, if not the finest, existing examples of Gothic architecture of French and English influence as adapted to wood frame domestic architecture to be found in the East Bay Area, and possibly in Northern California." The building was named Oakland Heritage Landmark #6 on January 7, 1975. It is one of five historic homes owned by the City of Oakland and currently serves as an office and storage space of the Oakland Parks and Recreation department.

The building is also known as J. Mora Moss Home, J. Mora Moss Cottage, Mosswood Cottage and simply Mosswood.

== History ==
=== J. Mora Moss ===
Joseph Moravia Moss was born in Philadelphia in 1809 and came to San Francisco, California in 1850 or 1854 to work as a clerk in a bank. From there he built a fortune in banking, ice and fur importing, canal and railroad building and telegraph and gas utilities. It was his wish to retire away from the city's hustle and bustle. Moss acquired a large parcel of land outside of Oakland's downtown, and he commissioned S. H. Williams on February 29, 1864, to design a two-story home on the property for US$14,500 plus building materials supplied by Moss. Williams, who referred to the design as a 'Gothic Cottage', contracted Joseph F. Heston to construct the building, but Heston defaulted on December 8, 1864. Moss finished the construction with his own builders guided by S. H. Williams. No records exist tallying the total cost of building the home.

Moss, a longtime bachelor, married his housekeeper, Julia Theresa Wood, in 1867. They named the estate "Mosswood", a concatenation of their two surnames.

Moss served as president of the Board of Trustees of the California State Asylum for the Deaf, Dumb and Blind. In 1868, Moss was elected Honorary Regent to the first Board of Regents of the University of California and was appointed regent in 1874 at which post he served until his death at Mosswood on November 21, 1880.

Julia Wood Moss retained title to Mosswood after her husband's death. In the early 1890s, she supervised additions to the home. A single story study was constructed and modifications to the library were carried out. A large east-by-southeast-facing bay window dormer was added to the master bedroom over the drawing room. Mrs. Moss died childless in 1904 while vacationing in Europe.

=== Mosswood Park ===
The tract of land that would become Mosswood Park was purchased by Moss from a Mr. Coffey in 1863. The home was built the following year. The Moss estate at that time was 27 acres (110,000 m^{2}); more than twice as large as modern-day Mosswood Park. Moss's property stretched from Telegraph Avenue to Glen Echo Creek and from Moss Avenue (now West MacArthur Boulevard) to 36th Street.

Julia Wood Moss increased the size of her estate by purchasing a parcel of land from C. W. Hathaway after the death of her husband. The new strip of land extended the property past Glen Echo Creek to Broadway.

After the death of Julia Wood Moss, the estate was subdivided: the northwestern section of the property was sold to developers who built single-family residential homes. The remaining 11-acre (45,000 m^{2}) Mosswood plot (which contained the main house) went to probate court for public auction. Oakland mayor Frank Kanning Mott, an advocate of the City Beautiful movement, pushed to save as much of the parcel as possible for public greenspace. City attorney John McElroy bid against a developer's syndicate with a winning bid of $65,100 borrowed by Mott from a group of bankers; the city's coffers were devoid of funds for such a purchase. In 1907, Oakland voters approved a bond measure to buy the estate from Mott's bankers and turn it into a municipal park, thus preserving the main house. The bankers erected a wrought-iron fence around the parcel to keep vandals out while park improvements were being implemented. Final transfer of the property came in 1912 at a cost of over US$100,000. In the following decades, the park's grounds were augmented with the addition of an amphitheater and a decorative pergola adjoining Broadway. Tennis and basketball courts were laid and children's playgrounds were established. Many city-sponsored activities took place at the park.

The wrought-iron fence surrounding Mosswood was taken down and donated to a scrap iron collection drive during World War II. For a brief few months in 1942, Oakland City Council renamed the park "MacArthur Park" in honor of General Douglas MacArthur, but the citizens of Oakland responded with roaring disapproval and the original name was reinstated. In 1945, Glen Echo Creek was undergrounded and landscaped over.

=== Community center ===
The J. Mora Moss House itself has been host to many activities including serving as an art studio and a preschool. In the 1950s, an extensive community center addition was built adjoining the home in order to satisfy the demand for a greater number of students participating in art classes through the City of Oakland department of Parks and Recreation. The historic building was relegated to serve as staff offices and storage space. A federal survey of the historic building in 1960 noted that the interior woodwork showed signs of hard wear from years of public service.

== Architecture ==
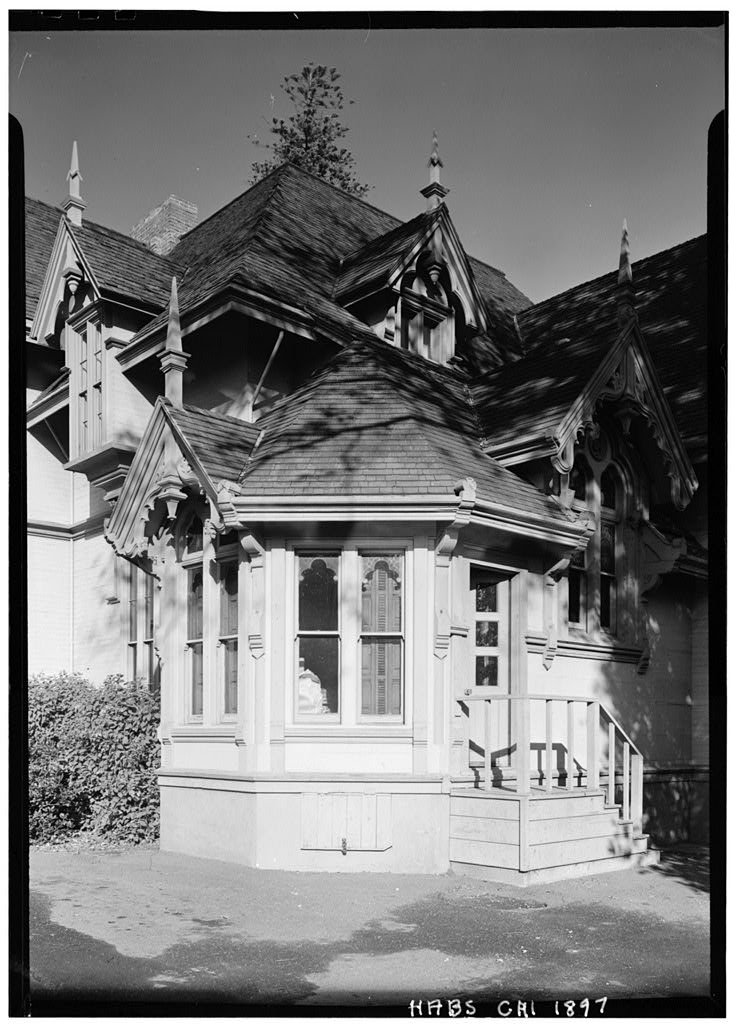
Jack E. Boucher's 1960 HABS photograph of the home's southwest corner detail

The building is constructed of Douglas Fir framing on twelve-inch (305 mm) centers holding smooth redwood plank tongue and groove siding with redwood sleepers, ground sills and redwood exterior ornamental features. It is founded on plastered brick which surrounds the dirt floor basement and forms a pedestal to support the rest of the framing. Metal trim around the chimneys augments the wood shingle roof ("best-quality of heart redwood" shingles with clipped corners were originally specified.) Gable-ended dormers extend through the steep roofline; decorated barge-boards and heavily molded finials, corbels and string corners adorn the dormers and roof eaves. A strong sense of verticality is enhance by tall, narrow windows and the steeply-angled 52.5° roof. The original main chimney vented flues from four fireplaces and rose in a slender pillar twelve feet above the roof at the symmetrical center of the building. Two other chimneys were of similar design. (By 1928, the tall, slender, cylindrical chimneys had been replaced by unremarkable short, rectangular brick ones.)

Honduras mahogany was used for built-in interior cabinetry, Port Orford Cedar trimmed the lower floor walls with the balance of wall woodwork being clear redwood. The doors have Gothic trefoil and quatrefoil panels and are made of thick soft wood incised to simulate black walnut.

The exterior redwood siding was painted in three coats of white lead and linseed oil; two of those coats were covered in "clean white sand" to provide texture and durability.

Mirrored glass as well as plated, gilded and cast metal ornamental features were shipped around the Horn from France and England. Cast plaster rosettes, bosses and medallions detail the ceiling which otherwise is composed of geometric traceries of wood on smooth plaster. The main interior staircase is composed of three flights in a square 'U' shape and is finished in oak handrails supported by gothic arch balusters. Upper and lower flooring is 1-inch (25 mm) blind-nailed hard pine tongue and groove. Hard pine steps make up the stairs.

The building holds approximately 5,500 square feet (510 m^{2}) of floor space. The upper story contains three major bedrooms with a shared bath; there are also three minor bedrooms. The ground story rooms include a parlor drawing room, a study, a library, an entry room leading into a spacious stair hall, a dining room, a kitchen and a pantry. It was originally piped for gas lighting; the gas manufactured on the premises. Gas chandeliers hung from cast plaster medallions. An elaborate fernery with water cascade was visible from the drawing room windows.

Stained glass decorative elements add color to selected windows. A pair of stained glass window insets hold both the Moss and the Wood family coats of arms.

== Gallery ==
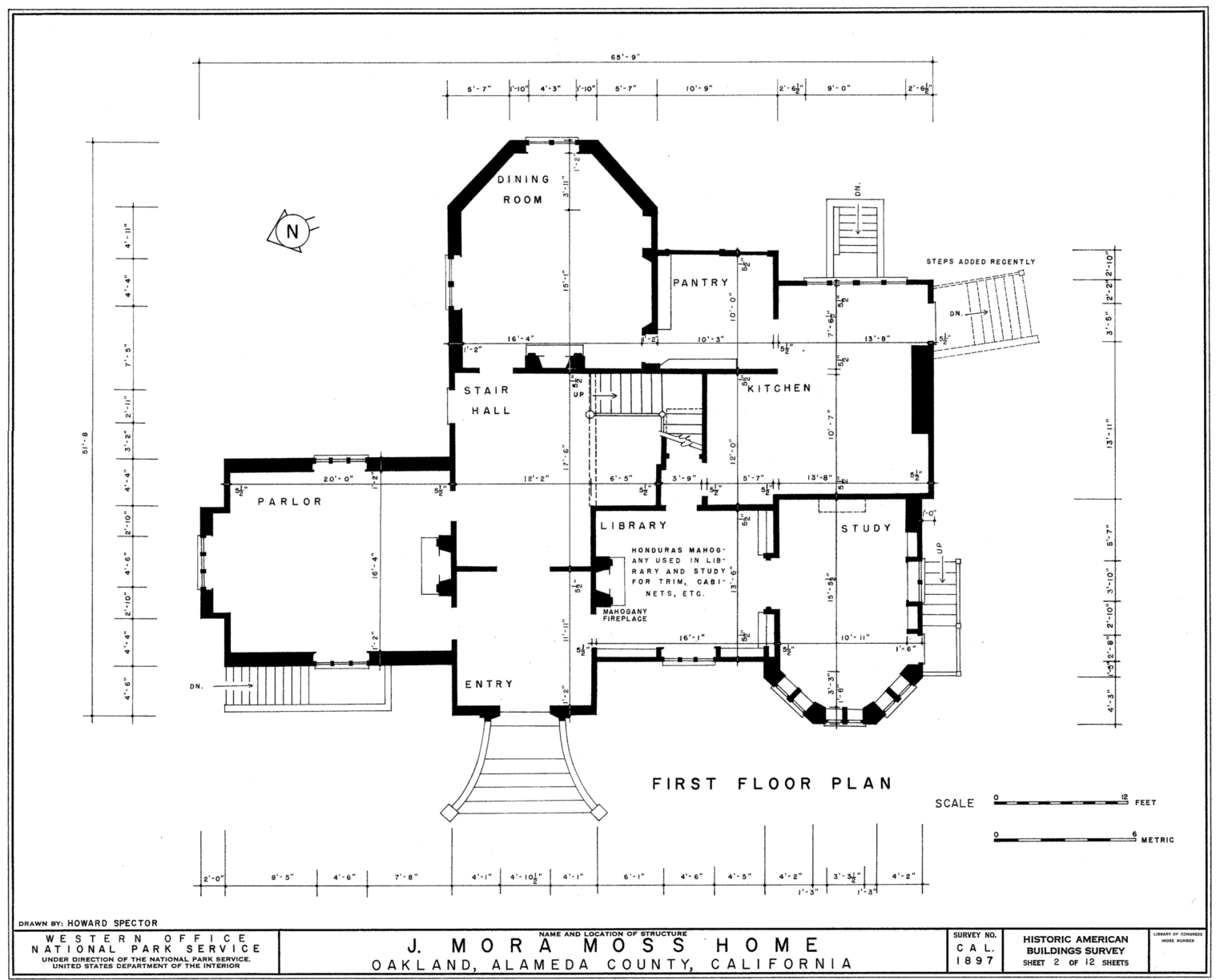
First floor plan of J. Mora Moss House

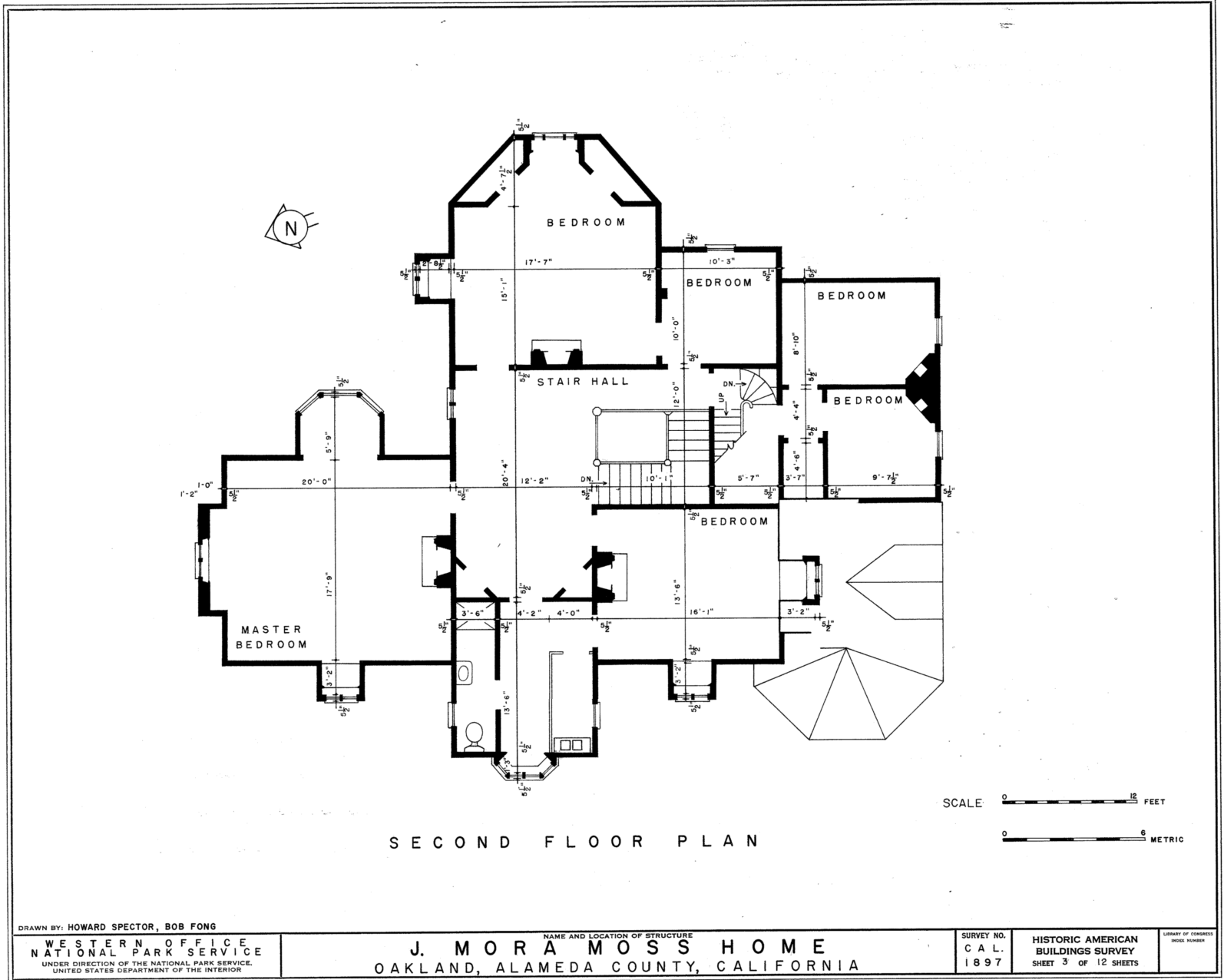
Second floor plan of J. Mora Moss House

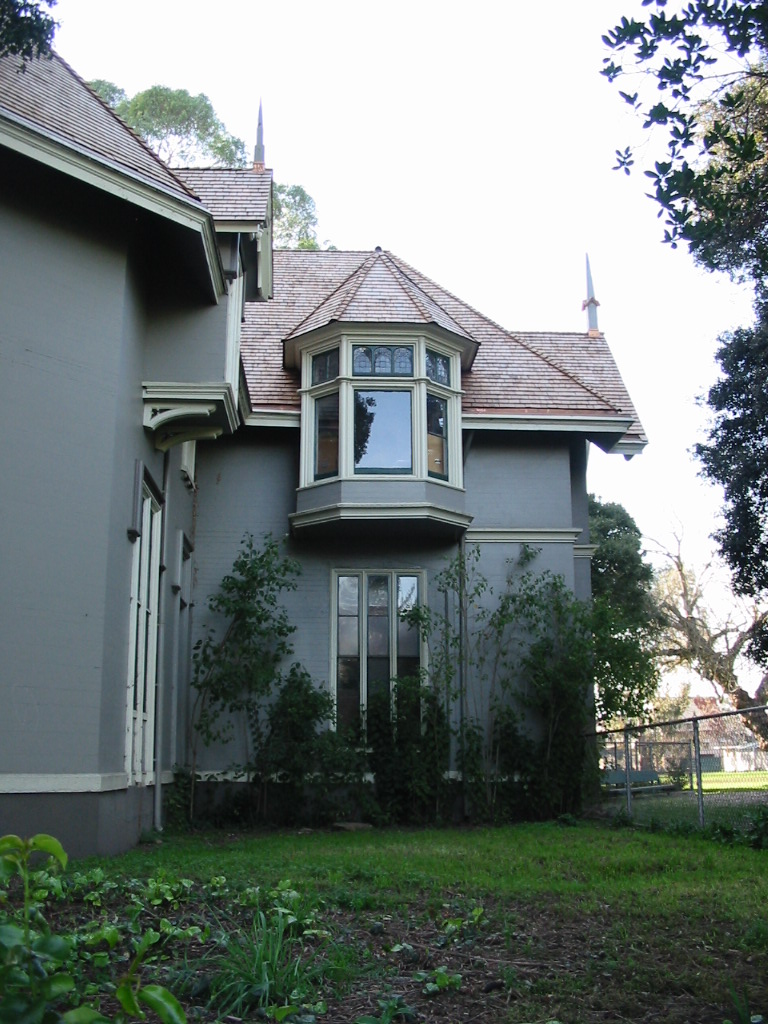
Southeast-facing second floor bay window added by widow Moss

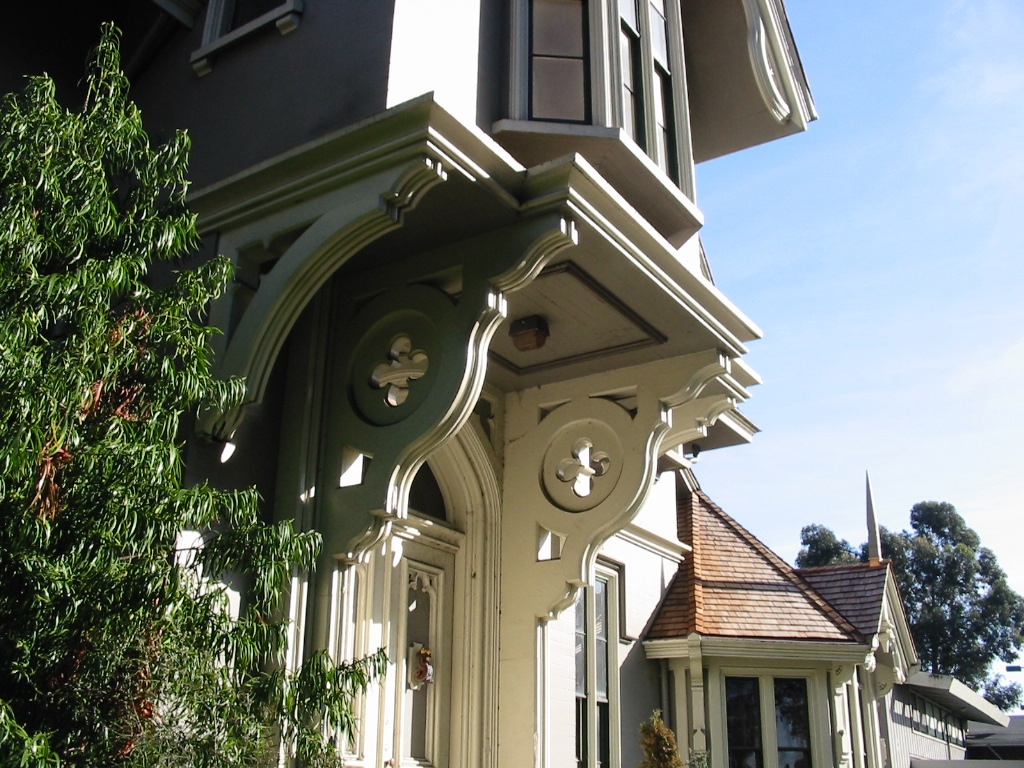
Details of gothic scrollwork over the main entrance

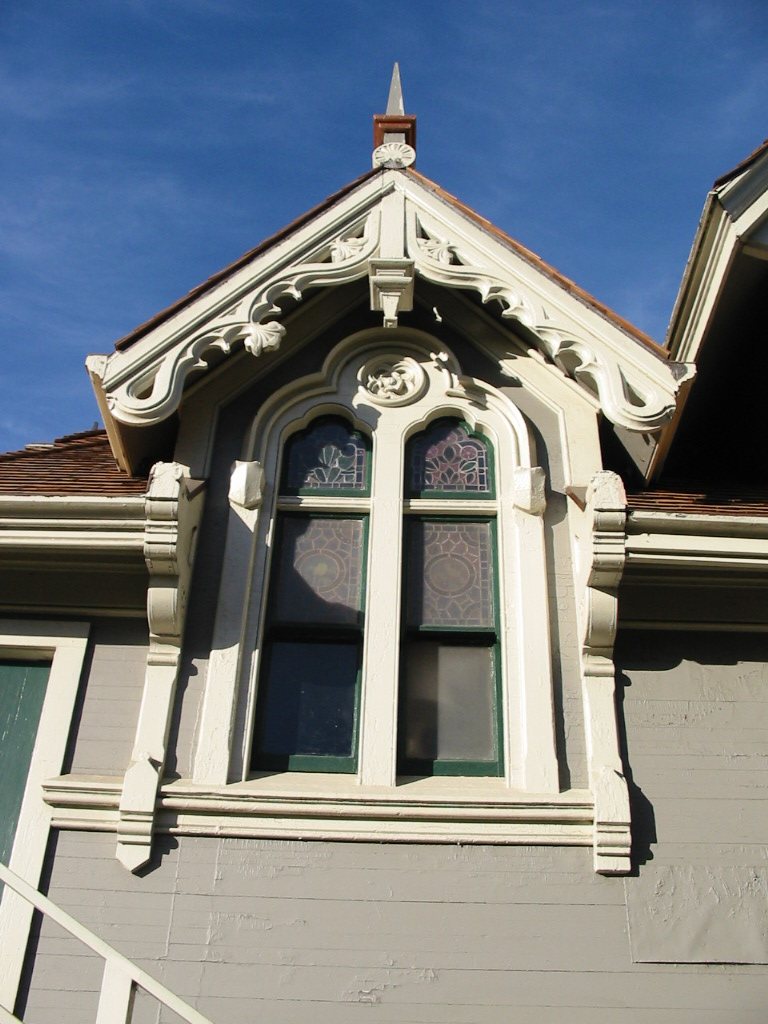
Twin windows with the Moss and the Wood family coats of arms in stained glass

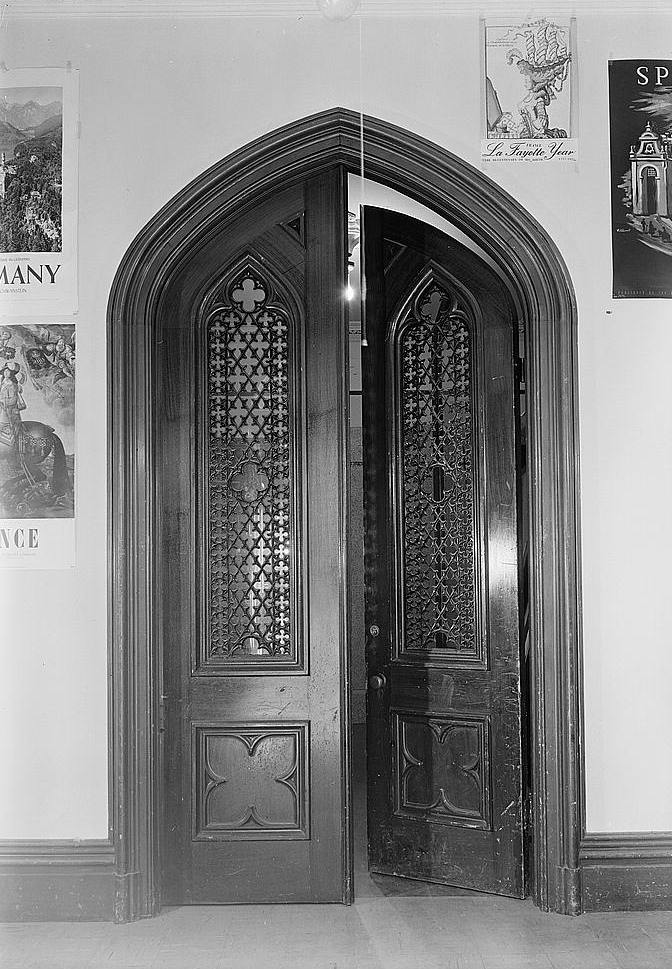
1960 HABS photo of gothic interior doors

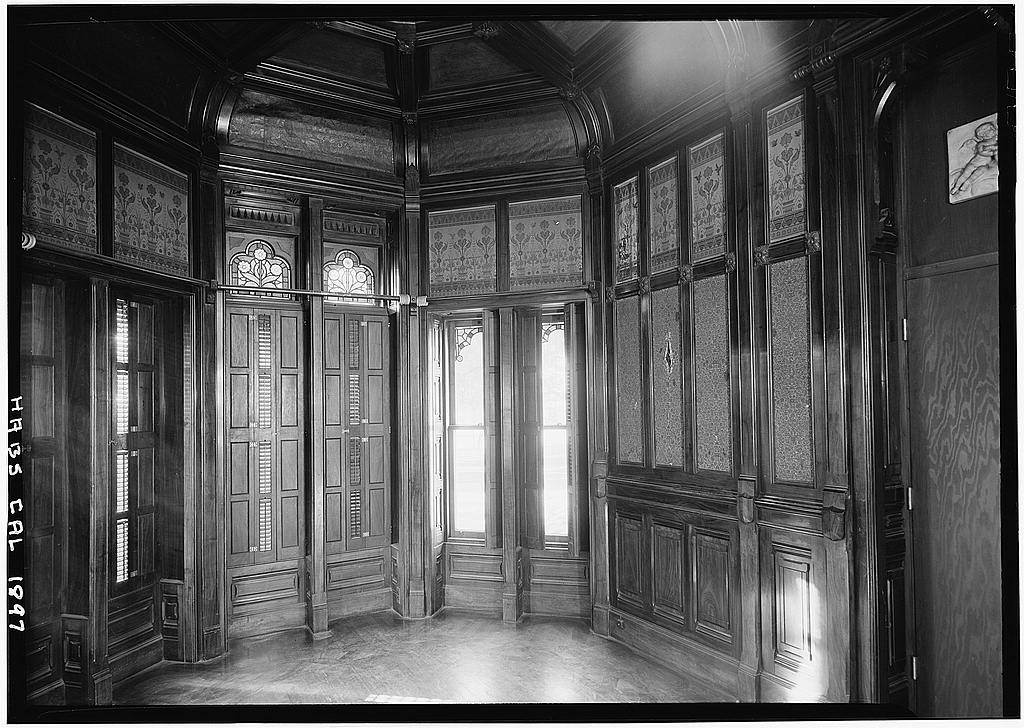
1960 HABS photo of the library, looking west

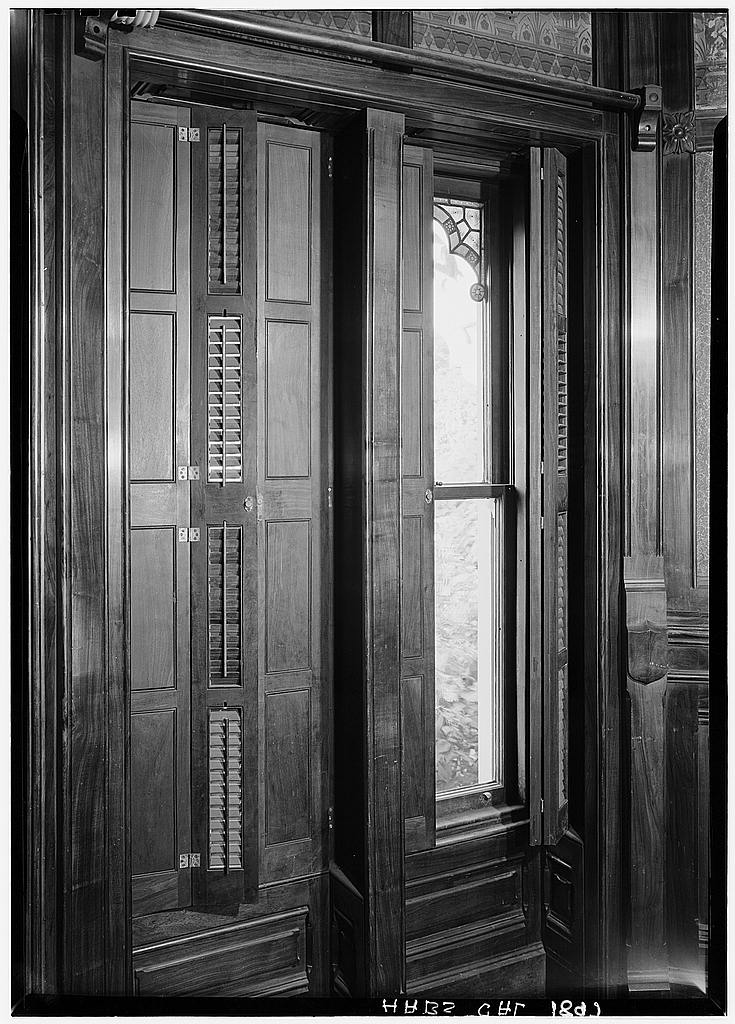
1960 HABS photo of library window detail

== See also ==
- Oakland Museum of California
- Oakland Heritage Alliance
- Oakland Public Library
- National Park Service
- Library of Congress
- American Memory
- Junior League
- Eadweard Muybridge
- Stereoscopy

== Bibliography ==
- Dave Bohn. East of These Golden Shores: Architecture of the Earlier Days in Contra Costa and Alameda Counties Junior League of Oakland and Scrimshaw Press, 1971. ISBN 0-912020-18-0
- Oakland Cultural Heritage Survey (OCHS), City of Oakland Planning Department. Published portions at Oakland Public Library's Oakland History Room.
