= Music from the Spheres =

Studio album by Sonny Simmons
- Released: 1968
- Recorded: December 1966
- Genre: Free jazz
- Label: ESP-Disk; 1043

Sonny Simmons chronology
Staying on the Watch (1966)	Music from the Spheres (1968)	Manhattan Egos (1969)

Music from the Spheres is an album by saxophonist Sonny Simmons. It was recorded in December 1966, and was released by ESP-Disk in 1968. On the album, Simmons is joined by saxophonist Bert Wilson, trumpeter Barbara Donald, pianist Mike Cohen, bassist Juney Booth, and drummer Jim Zitro.

The album was included in the 2005 compilation The Complete ESP-Disk Recordings.

== Reception ==
Professional ratings
Review scores
Source	Rating
AllMusic	4/5 stars
The Penguin Guide to Jazz	3/4 stars

In a review for AllMusic, Thom Jurek wrote: "Composition was the motivating factor for Simmons as a musician at the time, and despite his great talent as an improviser, it remains in the hold of his operative sustenance... here Simmons used strong modal figures to serve as both melody lines, stacking all of his players accordingly on the line, and equally as harmonic building blocks from which to continually push forward mode and interval... There aren't any weak moments here, just a very expansive hint on what was to come."

The authors of The Penguin Guide to Jazz awarded the album 3 stars, and stated that it "is immediately marked by the leader's obvious empathy with trumpeter Donald. They work superbly together on the opening 'Resolutions', an enterprising modal composition that sounds like no one else playing at the time. On 'Balladia' the group sound is reminiscent of the classic Ornette-Cherry quartet, though the piano is a giveaway, suggesting a different harmonic approach... the best thing on the set is the ambitious 'Zarak's Symphony', a strangely vulnerable and elusive idea that isn't allowed to outstay its welcome."

== Track listing ==
All compositions by Sonny Simmons.

1. "Resolutions" – 8:34
2. "Zarak's Symphony" – 12:42
3. "Balladia" – 12:42
4. "Dolphy's Days" – 13:30

== Personnel ==
- Sonny Simmons – alto saxophone
- Bert Wilson – tenor saxophone (track 4)
- Barbara Donald – trumpet
- Mike Cohen - piano
- Juney Booth – bass
- Jim Zitro – drums
