= Nomadic (Sonny Simmons & Moksha Samnyasin album) =

Studio album by Sonny Simmons & Moksha Samnyasin
- Released: November 28, 2014
- Recorded: 2012
- Genre: Psychedelic rock
- Length: 44:03
- Label: Svart Records
- Producer: Thomas Bellier

Nomadic is an album by jazz musician Sonny Simmons which incorporates elements of psychedelic rock, free jazz, and experimental drone metal. The album was recorded in 2012 in Paris, France and New York City, NY. Moksha Samnyasin is composed of French musicians Thomas Bellier (of Spindrift and Blaak Heat), Sébastien Bismuth (of Abrahma), and Michel Kristof (of Other Matter).

== Reception ==
In a review for The Sleeping Shaman, Guido Segers called the album a "wonderful journey... taking you through desert, mystery and courts of the kings of old," and wrote: "The music is enchanting and almost hypnotic. Like a calm sea of sound, the trio put down the groundwork for the freewheeling alto sax and English horn play of Simmons."

Pete Pardo of Sea of Tranquility commented: "The press info describes Nomadic as 'peyote-laced Bitches Brew', and that's probably not too far from the truth. While I would have liked to have heard a little more variety on some of the tempos here, for the most part this is a pretty intriguing set of psychedelic jazz that is well worth your attention."

Writing for Burning Ambulance, Phil Freeman stated: "Simmons' saxophone lines are long, heavily reverbed ribbons of sound that float and drift atop the thick, throbbing foundation set up by his bandmates. And yet, the last sound we hear is him whooping as he takes the horn from his lips, laughs, and says, 'Go get me a beer, please.' Capping off all the studio production, it's a perfectly human moment."

== Track listing ==
1. "Help Them Through This World" - 14:19
2. "We Are Entering The Place Of That" - 7:46
3. "I Put It In A Dark Area Where I Don't Remember No More" - 13:57
4. "When It Comes, I Don't Fight It" - 8:01

== Personnel ==
Sonny Simmons & Moksha Samnyasin

- Sonny Simmons - alto saxophone, cor anglais
- Thomas Bellier - bass
- Sébastien Bismuth - drums, electronics
- Michel Kristof - sitar

Production

- Thomas Bellier - producer, additional engineering
- Benjamin Colin - engineering
- Matt Hyde - mastering engineer
- Tokio Aoyama - cover art
- Julien Palomo - executive producer
- Michel Kristof - executive producer
