= Bert Wilson (musician) =

American jazz musician

- Born: October 15, 1939; Evansville, Indiana, U.S.
- Died: June 6, 2013 (aged 73); Olympia, Washington, U.S.
- Genres: Jazz
- Instruments: Clarinet, saxophone

Bert Wilson (October 15, 1939 – June 6, 2013) was an American jazz clarinetist and saxophonist.

== Early life ==
Wilson was born in Evansville, Indiana. His father and grandfather were both vaudeville showmen, and as a child, he did routines in traveling shows with his grandfather, but after contracting polio at age four, he suffered extended paralysis and was unable to move his arms for years. Once he recovered, he learned piano, and picked up clarinet at age thirteen; he didn't begin playing saxophone until age 18, after he had relocated from Chicago to Los Angeles.

== Career ==
In California, Wilson played as a leader in groups which included George Morrow and Albert Stinson, and played a show with John Coltrane in 1966. Later in 1966 he moved to New York City, where he played with James Zitro and Sonny Simmons; he returned to California in 1969, moving to Berkeley, where he worked with Barbara Donald, Donald Garrett, Eddie Marshall, and Smiley Winters.

Later in the 1970s he moved briefly to Woodstock, New York, and at the end of the decade relocated to Olympia, Washington, where he led the group Rebirth, which also included Nancy Curtis, Chuck Metcalf, Bob Myers, Jack Perciful, Chuck Stentz, and Allen Youngblood.
