= The Sweet Science =

The Sweet Science may refer to:

- The sport of boxing
- "The Sweet Science", a song by Vulfpeck
- The Dead Science (formerly The Sweet Science), an experimental pop band from Seattle, Washington
- The Sweet Science (book), a book by A. J. Liebling
