= My Spiritual Autobiography =

2009 book of the 14th Dalai Lama's speeches

- Author: Sofia Stril-Rever
- Language: French
- Publication date: 5 March 2009
- ISBN: 275090434X

Mon autobiographie spirituelle (My Spiritual Autobiography) is a book published in 2009, compiled by Sofia Stril-Rever from speeches and interviews of the 14th Dalai Lama.

== Description ==
The book is a compilation of unpublished texts of the Dalai Lama, which is accompanied by comments from the translator and collaborator of the Dalai Lama, Sofia Stril-Rever. Initially, the book was published in French, and in 2010 it became available translated and published in English and Russian. As of 2024, it has been translated into some twenty languages.

The title "My spiritual autobiography" may be a little misleading, for in some ways the book does not resemble an autobiography. The book identifies three characteristics – his compassionate motivation, lack of self-importance and flexibility of mind – while showing the internal coherence of the Dalai Lama's views in their temporal development, and the continuity of these points of view.

The book is composed of three parts. The first considers universal questions; in the second, the Dalai Lama – as a Buddhist monk – expressed his hopes for the spiritual transformation of the world through the transformation of each person's mind, and the third provides a history of the Dalai Lama, spiritual master of the Tibetan people, and 14th Dalai Lama's life in exile.

The book ends with a poem, "Never Give Up", written by the American writer Ron Whitehead in 1994, inspired by the Dalai Lama.

== See also ==
- Tibetan Buddhism
