= Manhattan Egos =

Studio album by Sonny Simmons
- Released: 1969; 2000
- Recorded: February 10, 1969; November 6, 1970
- Venue: Newman Center, Berkeley, California (1970 tracks)
- Studio: Sierra Sound Studios, Berkeley, California (1969 tracks)
- Genre: Free jazz
- Length: 1:18:42
- Label: Arhoolie Records; ST 8003 / CD 483
- Producer: Sonny Simmons, Chris Strachwitz

Sonny Simmons chronology
Music from the Spheres (1968)	Manhattan Egos (1969)	Rumasuma (1970)

Manhattan Egos is an album by saxophonist Sonny Simmons. It was recorded at Sierra Sound Studios in Berkeley, California on February 10, 1969, and was released on LP later that year by Arhoolie Records. On the album, Simmons is joined by trumpeter Barbara Donald, bassist and percussionist Juma Sultan, drummer Paul Smith, and conga player Voodoo Bembe. In 2000, Arhoolie reissued the album on CD with four additional tracks recorded live on November 6, 1970, at the Newman Center in Berkeley, California, with Simmons in a quartet that features violinist Michael White, bassist Kenny Jenkins, and drummer Eddie Marshall.

== Reception ==
Professional ratings
Review scores
Source	Rating
AllMusic	4/5 stars
The Penguin Guide to Jazz	3/4 stars

Regarding the studio tracks, AllMusic's Thom Jurek wrote: "Simmons and Donald... create a such a dominant frontline there is little else for the rhythm section to do but find a way to create rhythm and harmony from the interplay of the horns." He described the band on the live tracks as "stellar," and stated that audience members were "present to history in the making."

The authors of The Penguin Guide to Jazz Recordings called the album "a document of its time," and praised Simmons' solos for their "fuming energy and directness."

Duck Baker of JazzTimes stated that the music "dates better than a lot of free jazz of the time," and noted that "the original writing is quite effective."

Writing for All About Jazz, Derek Taylor stated that the album "finds Simmons and his partners in positively peak form," and commented: "this opportune offering makes readily apparent Simmons is a sizable talent... as an affordable vantage point into the man's early career this generous disc really cannot be bested." AAJ's Mark Corroto remarked: "Like Coleman and John Coltrane, Simmons' bands were pushing the envelope of freedom. The energy, pulsing from thirty-one years ago, is exhilarating... Simmons was propelling a creative sound beyond its safe boundaries."

Trumpeter Taylor Ho Bynum wrote: "Donald and Simmons' musical connection was near perfection; they navigated complex melodies with the telepathic ease of Bird and Diz or Coleman and Cherry, breathing and phrasing as one."

== Track listing ==
"Divine Magnet" composed by Michael White. Remaining tracks composed by Sonny Simmons. Track timings not provided.

1. "Coltrane In Paradise"
2. "The Prober"
3. "Manhattan Egos"
4. "Seven Dances Of Salami"
5. "Visions"
6. "Beings of Light" (bonus track on CD reissue)
7. "Purple Rays" (bonus track on CD reissue)
8. "Divine Magnet" (bonus track on CD reissue)
9. "The Beauty of Ibis" (bonus track on CD reissue)

== Personnel ==
- Sonny Simmons – alto saxophone, English horn
- Barbara Donald – trumpet (tracks 1 to 5)
- Michael White – violin (tracks 6 to 9)
- Juma Sultan – bass, congas (tracks 1 to 5)
- Kenny Jenkins – bass (tracks 6 to 9)
- Paul Smith – drums (tracks 1 to 5)
- Eddie Marshall – drums (tracks 6 to 9)
- Voodoo Bembe – congas (track 4)
