= Paul Tillman Smith =

American musician

- Genres: Jazz, blues, funk, soul, disco
- Occupations: Musician, band leader, songwriter, composer, drummer, percussionist
- Website: http://chumpchangerecords.com/

Paul Tillman Smith is an American drummer, percussionists, songwriter, artistic director, band leader, and promoter. Smith is a native of Oakland, California, United States. He has written for Pharoah Sanders, LaToya London, and Phyllis Hyman. He is one of the co-founders of the Berkeley Junteenth Festival in Berkeley, California. Smith is the Director of the Bay Area Jazz Society. His record label is Chump Change Records, and his band is Park Place. He has written over 150 songs, and has worked with Levi Seacer Jr., and Norman Connors on many albums.

== Early life ==
Smith got his first pair of drumsticks when he was four years old from his father George Smith. His father was a drummer and known as Kansas City Smitty. His father performed with Count Basie, Trumer Young, and the Harlem Aces. He got his first professional drumming gig with Lightnin' Hopkins when he was 15. It was at the Continental Club in West Oakland, California. He was encouraged to play the piano by his mother at the age of 15. After attending High School he played with Steve Miller in a hippy band called the Second Coming.

== Career ==
When Smith was 19 he left Oakland, California, with bassist/percussionist Juma Sultan. He lived in the basement of singer Richie Havens' house in the East Village of New York City. Smith started his music career as an avant-garde jazz drummer in New York City's Lower East Side in 1967. At the time he was friends with jazz drummer Norman Connors. He has performed or recorded with many musicians including John Handy Quarters, Abbey Lincoln, Dewey Redman, Faye Carol, Harold Land, Lorez Alexander, Odia Coates, The Head Hunters, Etta James, Jon Hendricks, Marlena Shaw, Gary Bartz, Reggie Lucas, Jimmy McCracklin, Richard Pryor, Bobby Lyle, Pharoah Sanders, Albert Ayler, Cecil McBee, Sonny Simmons, John Handy, Bobby Hutcherson, Merl Saunders, Ed Kelly, George Duke, Woody Shaw, Alice Coltrane, Bill Bell, Eddie Henderson, (jazz violinist) Michael White, Jackie McLean, Donnie Williams, Latoya London, Robert Stewart (saxophonist), Rosie Gaines, Levi Seacer Jr., Rodney Franklin, Kenneth Nash, and Khalil Shaheed.

In the 1970 and 1980s, Smith promoted free concerts in Berkeley, California's Provo Park, and in Oakland, California's Mosswood Park. When he was the music and concert Alameda County Neighborhood Arts Program.

Smith, along with Sam Dykes, and R.D. Bonds, are the co-founders of the annual Berkeley, California Juneteenth festival. Which is one of the oldest, largest, and longest running African American Arts and Music festival in Northern California. He has also been stage manager for the Richmond Juneteenth festival, and the Oakland California Port Festival. He has also organized the music program for the city of Emeryville's Appreciation Day Festival, and the Vallejo Fourth of July festival. He has managed the Berkeley's Artspark Festival.

In 1977, Smith recorded Sharing with the band "Vitamin E" along with Bianca Thornton, known as Lady Bianca, and David Gardner for Buddha Records. Sharing featured Sly Stone and Frank Zappa, with vocals from Lady Bianca, and David Gardener. The album was produced by Norman Connors.

In 2001, Smith's Crying for Love recording won that year's Blues and Soul magazine's award.

In 2002, Smith founded the Big Belly Blues Band. The name of the band originated from a blues song co-written by Paul Smith and Faye Carol in Oakland, California.

In 2013, Smith released Bed Ballads as band leader. The vocalists and musicians on the album were Paul Tillman Smith, Phyllis Hyman, Lenny Williams, Pharoah Sanders, the Brecker Brothers, Jon Faddis, James Gadson, Mtume, Bobby Lyle, Wah Wah Watson, and David T. Walker. The album was produced by Norman Connors.

== Discography ==
- 1977 - Sharing with Vitamin E (Buddah Records)
- 2002 - The Invisible Man (Chump Change Records)
- 2013 - Bed Ballads (CD album)
- 2017 - A Beautiful Heart (CD album)

== Musical groups ==
- Bridge
- Park Place
- Vitamin E
- Big Belly Blues Band

== Theater and film credits ==
- Musical director for Melvin Van Peebles Ain’t Supposed To Die A Natural Death.
- Paul T. Smith along with Lonnie Hewitt (Cal Tjader)'s pianist wrote songs for the Off-Broadway play Dunbar, based on the writings of Paul Lawrence Dunbar. Dunbar won a New York Audelco Theater Award.
- Twelve of his songs were showcased in the 2005 feature film, Tears of a Clown. It was produced by Tony Spires.
