= Submariner =

Submariner may refer to:

- A sailor who is a crew member of a submarine
- A baseball pitcher who pitches with an underhand motion
- Namor the Sub-Mariner, a character appearing in comic books published by Marvel Comics
- Rolex Submariner, a Rolex diving watch model
- Submariner (album), a 2003 album by experimental-rock band The Dead Science
- "Submariner", a song by Helen Marnie from the 2013 album Crystal World
