= The Land of Spirit and Light =

Studio album by Michael White
- Released: 1973
- Recorded: February 7 & 8, 1973
- Studio: Village Recorder, Los Angeles
- Genre: Jazz
- Length: 39:19
- Label: Impulse! AS 9241
- Producer: Ed Michel

Michael White chronology
Pneuma (1972)	The Land of Spirit and Light (1973)	Father Music, Mother Dance (1974)

The Land of Spirit and Light is an album by American violinist and composer Michael White, featuring performances recorded in 1973 and released on the Impulse! label.

== Reception ==
The AllMusic review awarded the album 4½ stars stating "The Land of Spirit and Light is a spiritual jazz classic. Ambitious, outrageously creative, and aesthetically restless, it is simply one of the finest outings on the Impulse! label".

Professional ratings
Review scores
Source	Rating
Allmusic	4.5/5 stars

== Track listing ==
All compositions by Michael White except as indicated

1. "The Land of Spirit and Light (Part 1)" – 2:43
2. "The Land of Spirit and Light (Part 2)" – 3:21
3. "The Land of Spirit and Light (Part 3)" – 4:33
4. "Fatima's Garden" – 10:01
5. "Fiesta Dominical" – 7:23
6. "O Ancient One" – 8:52
7. "Lament (Mankind)" (Cecil McBee, White) – 2:26

== Personnel ==
- Michael White – violin
- Prince Lasha – piccolo, flute, alto flute, clarinet
- Ed Kelly – piano
- Bob King – classical guitar
- Cecil McBee – bass
- Kenneth Nash – percussion
- Stanley Nash, Kenny Jenkins, and ABC Messenger delivery man – vocals
