= The Cry! =

Studio album by Prince Lasha Quintet featuring Sonny Simmons
- Released: 1963
- Recorded: November 21, 1962; Los Angeles, California
- Genre: Jazz
- Length: 41:37
- Label: Contemporary; M 3610/S7610
- Producer: Lester Koenig

Prince Lasha chronology
The Cry! (1963)	Inside Story (1965)

The Cry! is an album by saxophonists Prince Lasha and Sonny Simmons which was recorded in late 1962 and released on the Contemporary label.

== Reception ==
Professional ratings
Review scores
Source	Rating
Allmusic	4/5 stars

Allmusic awarded the album 4 stars with its review by Alex Henderson stating: "This album is quirky and dissonant, but it isn't harsh or confrontational. In avant-garde circles, The Cry! went down in history as one of Lasha's finest accomplishments -- and deservedly so". On All About Jazz, Dave Rickert described the music as "fine free jazz that succeeds at being adventurous without being demanding".

== Track listing ==
All compositions by Prince Lasha and Sonny Simmons

1. "Congo Call" - 5:02
2. "Bojangles" - 7:00
3. "Green and Gold" - 4:52
4. "Ghost of the Past" - 4:59
5. "Red's Mood" - 5:04
6. "Juanita" - 5:32
7. "Lost Generation" - 5:15
8. "A.Y." - 4:46

== Personnel ==
- Prince Lasha - alto saxophone, flute
- Sonny Simmons - alto saxophone
- Gary Peacock, Mark Proctor (except tracks 2, 7, 8) - bass
- Gene Stone - drums
