= Insight (Prince Lasha album) =

1966 studio album by Prince Lasha Ensemble

Studio album by Prince Lasha Ensemble
- Released: 1966
- Recorded: 1966; England
- Genre: Jazz
- Length: 39:45
- Label: CBS; 62409
- Producer: David Howells, Victor Graham

Prince Lasha chronology
Inside Story (1965)	Insight (1966)	Firebirds (1968)

Insight is an album by saxophonist/flautist Prince Lasha that was recorded in England in 1966 and originally released on the CBS label.

== Reception ==
Professional ratings
Review scores
Source	Rating
Allmusic	4/5 stars

Allmusic awarded the album 4 stars, with its review by Thom Jurek stating: "this is not an exploratory outside date, but a straight-ahead session of originals and standards, divided between uptempo numbers and ballads. ...For all its traditionalism, this is indeed a major date for Lasha and reveals how deeply ensconced he was in the bop and swing lineages."

== Track listing ==
All compositions by Prince Lasha except as indicated

1. "Nuttin Out Jones" - 6:16
2. "Out of Nowhere" (Johnny Green, Edward Heyman) - 7:37
3. "Body & Soul" (Green, Heyman, Frank Eyton, Robert Sour) - 6:32
4. "Impressions of Eric Dolphy" - 7:06
5. "Everything Happens to Me" (Tom Adair, Matt Dennis) - 5:23
6. "Just Friends" (John Klenner, Sam M. Lewis) - 6:54

== Personnel ==
- Prince Lasha - alto saxophone, flute
- Chris Bateson - trumpet
- John Mumford - trombone
- David Snell - harp
- Mike Carr, Stan Tracey - piano
- Bruce Cale, Dave Willis, Jeff Clyne, Rick Laird - bass
- Joe Oliver - drums
