= Rumasuma =

Studio album by Sonny Simmons
- Released: 1970
- Recorded: July 31 & August 1, 1969; Contemporary's Studio, Los Angeles, California
- Genre: Jazz
- Length: 43:28
- Label: Contemporary; M 3623/S7623
- Producer: Lester Koenig

Sonny Simmons chronology
Manhattan Egos (1969)	Rumasuma (1970)	Burning Spirits (1971)

Rumasuma is an album by the saxophonist Sonny Simmons, which was recorded in 1969 and released on the Contemporary label in 1970.

== Reception ==
Professional ratings
Review scores
Source	Rating
AllMusic	3/5 stars
The Encyclopedia of Popular Music	3/5 stars

AllMusic reviewer Scott Yanow described the album as containing "exciting and very creative music." Jazz & Blues wrote that "Simmons and his associates bring to all these items an intensity of purpose which transcends their differing characteristics, so that the impression the listener takes away is of a group of players at once liberated from stylistic prejudice and wholeheartedly committed to the task at hand." The editors of Billboard included the album in their list of "4 Star" releases.

== Track listing ==
All compositions by Sonny Simmons

1. "Rumasuma" - 10:50
2. "Back to the Apple" - 10:25
3. "Reincarnation" - 11:35
4. "For Posterity" - 10:38

== Personnel ==
- Sonny Simmons - alto saxophone
- Barbara Donald - trumpet
- Michael Cohen - piano
- Bill Pickens, Jerry Sealand - double bass
- Billy Higgins - drums
