= Crepuscule with the Dead Science =

Crepuscule with The Dead Science

EP by The Dead Science
- Released: September 2006
- Label: Slender Means Society
- Producer: Jherek Bischoff, Ryan Hadlock

The Dead Science chronology
Frost Giant (2005)	Crepuscule with The Dead Science (2006)	Villainaire (2008)

Crepuscule with The Dead Science is the third EP from The Dead Science, released in 2006 on Slender Means Society. Two tracks, "Child/Actress" and a cover of John Dowland's "All Ye Whom Love of Fortune", were recorded during the Frost Giant sessions. Thanks in the liner notes is given to "Mr. Zazzary 'Veins' Pendleton", apparently code for Zac Pennington, Slender Means Society's founder.

== Track listing ==
1. "Child/Actress"
2. "Displacer Beast"
3. "ps The Past"
4. "White Stain"
5. "All Ye Whom Love of Fortune"
