= Burning Spirits =

Studio album by Sonny Simmons
- Released: 1971
- Recorded: November 24, 1970; Contemporary's Studio, Los Angeles, California
- Genre: Jazz
- Length: 79:18
- Label: Contemporary; S7625/26
- Producer: Lester Koenig

Sonny Simmons chronology
Rumasuma (1970)	Burning Spirits (1971)	Backwoods Suite (1982)

Burning Spirits is a double album by American jazz saxophonist Sonny Simmons (credited as Huey Simmons on the initial release), which was recorded in 1970 and released on the Contemporary label.

== Reception ==
Professional ratings
Review scores
Source	Rating
AllMusic	4/5 stars
Rolling Stone	favorable
The Penguin Guide to Jazz Recordings	3/4 stars
Tom Hull – on the Web	B+

AllMusic awarded the album four stars with its review by Alex Henderson stating: "Burning Spirits is generally more free jazz than post-bop. But regardless of whether Simmons is playing inside or outside (usually outside), the saxman plays with tremendous conviction on this album."

Robert Palmer of Rolling Stone commented: "Simmons and friends have taken the developments of the past ten years [...] and compacted them into an ever-changing kaleidoscope of spaces and densities that make a lot of what's au courant seem pale by comparison. If you buy only one LP of 'jazz' music this year, make it this one."

Writing for All About Jazz, Jeff Stockton commented: "it would be nearly 22 years before [Simmons] made another significant recording after Burning Spirits. The harrowing intensity of the solos, the unrelenting quest for transcendence, and the overriding spirituality of the compositions indicate a substantial amount of recovery time was in order... For 80 minutes Burning Spirits grabs you by the collar and doesn't let go. It's a full dose of old school energy music that's hard to come by these days."

== Track listing ==
All compositions by Huey Simmons

1. "Burning Spirits No. 1" - 11:34
2. "New Newk" - 11:42
3. "Healing Rays" - 15:55
4. "Burning Spirits No. 2" - 13:47
5. "Things and Beings" - 9:27
6. "E=MC²" - 16:53

== Personnel ==
- Sonny Simmons - alto saxophone, tenor saxophone, English horn
- Barbara Donald - trumpet (tracks 1, 3, 4 & 6)
- Michael White - violin (tracks 1 & 3–6)
- Lonnie Liston Smith - piano (tracks 2 & 5)
- Richard Davis, Cecil McBee (tracks 1 & 3–6) - bass
- Clifford Jarvis - drums
