= Illumination! =

Studio album by Elvin Jones/Jimmy Garrison Sextet
- Released: January 9, 1964
- Recorded: August 8, 1963
- Studio: Van Gelder, Englewood Cliffs, NJ
- Genre: Jazz
- Length: 31:14
- Label: Impulse! A-49
- Producer: Bob Thiele

Elvin Jones chronology
Elvin! (1962)	Illumination! (1964)	Dear John C. (1965)

Illumination! is a studio album by the Elvin Jones/Jimmy Garrison Sextet. It was released on January 9, 1964, through Impulse! Records. The sextet assembled for the session featured pianist McCoy Tyner, alto saxophonist Sonny Simmons, flautist Prince Lasha and baritone saxophonist Charles Davis. Jones, Garrison, and Tyner were bandmates in the John Coltrane Quartet.

== Reception ==
Professional ratings
Review scores
Source	Rating
AllMusic	4.5/5 stars
The Rolling Stone Jazz Record Guide	4/5 stars

AllMusic's Scott Yanow describes the band's performance in his review of the Illumination! as "the music ranges from advanced hard bop to freer sounds that still swing".

== Track listing ==
1. "Nuttin' Out Jones" (Lasha) – 5:36
2. "Oriental Flower" (Tyner) – 3:49
3. "Half and Half" (Charles Davis) – 6:28
4. "Aborigine Dance in Scotland" (Simmons) – 4:12
5. "Gettin' On Way" (Garrison) – 5:14
6. "Just Us Blues" (Davis) – 5:55

== Personnel ==
- Elvin Jones – drums
- Jimmy Garrison – bass
- McCoy Tyner – piano
- Sonny Simmons – alto saxophone, English Horn
- Charles Davis – baritone saxophone
- (William) Prince Lasha – clarinet, flute
