= Pneuma (Michael White album) =

Waterfalls

Studio album by Michael White
- Released: 1972
- Recorded: July 17–19, 1972
- Studio: Village Recorder, Los Angeles
- Genre: Jazz
- Length: 38:16
- Label: Impulse! AS 9221
- Producer: Ed Michel

Michael White chronology
Spirit Dance (1971)	Waterfalls (1972)	The Land of Spirit and Light (1973)

Pneuma is an album by American violinist and composer Michael White featuring performances recorded in 1972 and released on the Impulse! label.

== Reception ==
Professional ratings
Review scores
Source	Rating
Allmusic	3.5/5 stars

Allmusic reviewer Mark Allan states, "This ground-breaking jazz violinist demands much from his listeners".

== Track listing ==
All compositions by Michael White

1. "Pneuma (Part 1)" – 5:16
2. "Pneuma (Part 2)" – 4:57
3. "Pneuma (Part 3)" – 4:11
4. "Pneuma (Part 4)" – 4:13
5. "Pneuma (Part 5)" – 1:52
6. "Ebony Plaza" – 9:18
7. "Journey of the Black Star" – 2:53
8. "The Blessing Song" – 6:25

== Personnel ==
- Michael White – violin
- Ed Kelly – piano
- Ray Drummond – bass
- Kenneth Nash – percussion
- Faye Kelly, Leola Sharp, D. Jean Skinner, Joyce Walker – vocals
