= Firebirds (album) =

1968 studio album by Prince Lasha/Sonny Simmons

Studio album by Prince Lasha/Sonny Simmons
- Released: 1968, 1993-95 CD
- Recorded: September 27–29, 1967
- Genre: Jazz
- Label: Contemporary Records
- Producer: Lester Koenig

Prince Lasha chronology
Insight (1966)	Firebirds (1968)	Firebirds Live at Berkeley Jazz Festival Vol. I (1976)

Professional ratings
Review scores
Source	Rating
Allmusic	5/5 stars
The Rolling Stone Jazz Record Guide	4/5 stars
The Penguin Guide to Jazz Recordings	3/4 stars

Firebirds is a 1968 album by two American jazz musicians, Prince Lasha (alto saxophone, flute, alto clarinet) and Sonny Simmons (alto saxophone, English horn). Other participating musicians in this album were bassist Buster Williams, drummer Charles Moffett and vibraphonist Bobby Hutcherson.

== Reception ==
The album was praised by critics, and Scott Yanow from AllMusic gave it five stars as an AMG pick.

== Track listing ==
No.	Title	Length
1.	"The Island Song"	8:47
2.	"Psalm of Solomon"	10:45
3.	"Prelude to Bird"	3:53
4.	"The Loved Ones"	5:21
5.	"Firebirds"	10:05

== Personnel ==
- Prince Lasha - alto saxophone, alto clarinet, flute
- Sonny Simmons - alto saxophone, english horn
- Bobby Hutcherson - vibraphone
- Buster Williams - bass
- Charles Moffett - drums
