= Barbara Donald =

American trumpeter and musician

Donald in 1970 from Simmons' Burning Spirits album

Barbara Kay Donald (September 2, 1942 – March 23, 2013) was an American jazz trumpeter and bandleader.

== Life and career ==
She was born in Minneapolis, Minnesota, United States. Donald began playing trumpet aged eight in Minnesota, and her family relocated to California when she was a teenager. Beginning in the early 1960s, she began touring with both rhythm and blues and jazz ensembles throughout the US, and played with John Coltrane, Stanley Cowell, Richard Davis, Dexter Gordon, Roland Kirk, Prince Lasha, and Sonny Simmons. In 1964, Donald and Simmons married; one of their children, Zarak Simmons, became a percussionist. Starting in 1978, she began recording with her own ensembles, while living in Washington, for the label Cadence Jazz. Her sidemen at one time included her son Zarak, Gary Peacock, Carter Jefferson and Rahn Burton.

After experiencing a series of strokes rendering her unable to actively play live, Donald lived in an assisted care facility in Olympia, Washington, from 1998 until her death in 2013.

== Discography ==
As leader

- Olympia Live (Cadence Jazz, 1982)
- The Past and Tomorrows (Cadence Jazz, 1983)

With Sonny Simmons

- Staying on the Watch (ESP-Disk, 1966)
- Music from the Spheres (ESP-Disk, 1968)
- Manhattan Egos (Arhoolie, 1969)
- Rumasuma (Contemporary, 1970)
- Burning Spirits (Contemporary, 1971)
- Reincarnation (Arhoolie, 2015)

== Bibliography ==
- "Barbara Donald". The New Grove Dictionary of Jazz. Second edition, ed. Barry Kernfeld. ISBN 9780333632314
