= Mike Carr (musician) =

English jazz musician (1937–2017)

- Born: 7 December 1937; South Shields, County Durham, England
- Died: 22 September 2017 (aged 79)
- Occupations: Jazz organist, pianist and vibraphonist
- Relatives: Ian Carr (brother)

Mike Carr (born Michael Anthony Carr, 7 December 1937 – 22 September 2017) was an English jazz organist, pianist and vibraphonist.

== Biography ==
Mike Carr was born on 7 December 1937 in South Shields, County Durham, England.

The younger brother of trumpeter Ian Carr, with whom he formed the EmCee Five group, he began playing in Newcastle in the 1960s, before leaving for London in the 1970s and appearing regularly at Ronnie Scott's Jazz Club. EmCee Five featured some of the UK's leading jazz musicians of the 1960s and 1970s, including John McLaughlin, Ronnie Stephenson, Malcolm Cecil, Spike Heatley and Johnny Butts. In 1976, Carr was band member of Eric Burdon.

From 1971 until 1975, Carr was a member of Ronnie Scott's trio, first with Tony Crombie and later with Bobby Gien. In the mid-1980s, Carr led the band Cargo.

== Discography ==
=== with Emcee Five ===
- 1961: Let's Take Five.
- 1962: Bebop from the East Coast (Birdland) with Ian Carr, John McLaughlin
- 2005: Legend

=== Other recordings ===
- 1979: Mike Carr and his Trio featuring Jim Mullen and Harold Smith - Live at Ronnie Scotts (Spotlight SPJ517)
- 1993: Good Times and the Blues (Cargogold) with Dick Morrissey, Jim Mullen

With Prince Lasha

- Insight (CBS, 1966)
