= Go with the Flow (album) =

Go With the Flow

Studio album by Michael White
- Released: 1974
- Recorded: June 4, 5 & 6, 1974
- Studio: ABC, Los Angeles, California
- Genre: Jazz
- Length: 40:24
- Label: Impulse! ASD 9281
- Producer: Ed Michel

Michael White chronology
Father Music, Mother Dance (1974)	Go With the Flow (1974)	The X Factor (1978)

Professional ratings
Review scores
Source	Rating
Allmusic	3/5 stars
DownBeat	2.5/5 stars

Go With the Flow is an album by American violinist and composer Michael White's Magic Music Company featuring performances recorded in 1974 and released on the Impulse! label.

== Track listing ==
All compositions by Michael White

1. "Go With the Flow #1" – 10:04
2. "The Lady Sirro" – 2:12
3. "In The Silence (Listen)" – 6:44
4. "Spaceslide" – 4:34
5. "Her" – 6:17
6. "Moondust Shuffle" – 5:01
7. "Go With the Flow #2" – 5:32

== Personnel ==
- Michael White – electric violin, tambourine, ashtray synthesizer, percussion
- Ed Kelly – piano, electric piano, organ
- Bob King – guitar
- Kenneth Jenkins – bass, electric bass, wah-wah pedal
- Paul Smith – drums
- Kenneth Nash – congas, griot bells, thumb piano, vocals, gong, synthesizer, bells, percussion
