= Father Music, Mother Dance =

Studio album by Michael White
- Released: 1974
- Recorded: January 16, 17 & 18, 1974
- Studios: Wally Heider, San Francisco
- Genre: Jazz
- Length: 28:36
- Labels: Impulse! AS 9268
- Producer: Ed Michel

Michael White chronology
The Land of Spirit and Light (1973)	Father Music, Mother Dance (1974)	Go With the Flow (1974)

Professional ratings
Review scores
Source	Rating
Allmusic	3.5/5 stars

Father Music, Mother Dance is an album by American violinist and composer Michael White featuring performances recorded in 1974 and released on the Impulse! label.

== Track listing ==
All compositions by Michael White

1. "Father Music, Mother Dance" – 5:40
2. "Reiko" – 6:31
3. "Commin' From" – 4:49
4. "Way Down Inside" – 6:34
5. "Water Children" – 9:15
6. "Mary's Waltz" – 3:38

== Personnel ==
- Michael White – electric violin, rhythm violin, African tambourine, bass drum, handclapper, Moog synthesizer, vocals
- Norman Williams – alto saxophone
- Clifford Coulter – piano, electric piano, organ
- Bob King – guitar
- Kenneth Jenkins – bass, electric bass
- Clarence Becton – drums, agogô
- Kenneth Nash – congas, North African sakara drum, Knole drum, Chinese temple bells and gongs, cowbell, tambourine, wood bells, piano, electric piano bottom, pepper filled Kodak film can shaker, assorted African and South American percussion instruments
- Marti McCall – lead vocals, backing vocals
- Josef Powell, Myrna Matthews – backing vocals
