= Dear John C. =

Studio album by Elvin Jones
- Released: November 1965
- Recorded: February 23 & 25, 1965
- Studio: Van Gelder, Englewood Cliffs, NJ
- Genre: Jazz
- Length: 39:25
- Label: Impulse! A-88
- Producer: Bob Thiele

Elvin Jones chronology
Illumination! (1963)	Dear John C. (1965)	And Then Again (1965)

Dear John C. is an album by American jazz drummer Elvin Jones, recorded in 1965 for the Impulse! label. The "John C." mentioned in the title is John Coltrane. The album was also released on SACD. It features Jones leading a quartet of alto saxophonist Charlie Mariano, pianist Roland Hanna and bassist Richard Davis.

== Reception ==
The AllMusic review by Michael G. Nastos stated, "The variety from cut to cut is engaging, and there's nothing over the top, even the drumming of Elvin Jones. With the musicality at a high level, Dear John C. needs revisiting by drumming students and jazz fans to note how teamwork, shared values, and held-in-check dynamics benefit the overall quality of music. It seems this recording is underrated when over time it should never be. Dear John C. is deserving of an excellent rating".

Professional ratings
Review scores
Source	Rating
AllMusic	4/5 stars
DownBeat	3.5/5 stars
The Rolling Stone Jazz Record Guide	4/5 stars

== Track listing ==
Original track listing

1. "Dear John C." (Hammer, Thiele) - 3:54
2. "Smoke Rings" (Gifford, Washington) - 3:41
3. "Love Bird" (Mingus) - 3:49
4. "Feeling Good" (Anthony Newley, Leslie Bricusse) - 4:11
5. "Anthropology" (Gillespie, Parker) - 4:20
6. "This Love of Mine" (Sol Parker, Hank Sanicola, Sinatra) - 4:20
7. "Fantazm" (Ellington) - 3:56
8. "Ballade" (Hammer) - 5:18
9. "Everything Happens to Me" (Tom Adair, Matt Dennis) - 5:56

Recorded on February 23, 1965 (tracks 2, 4, 5, 6 and 7), and February 25, 1965 (tracks 1, 3, 8, 9)

A CD reissue features a different track list and the bonus track "That Five-Four Bag"

== Personnel ==
- Elvin Jones – drums
- Charlie Mariano – alto saxophone
- Roland Hanna (1, 3, 8) – piano
- Hank Jones (4, 5, 7) – piano
- Richard Davis – bass
