= Inside Story (Prince Lasha album) =

Studio album by Prince Lasha
- Released: 1981
- Recorded: 1965
- Studio: CBS Studio, New York City
- Genre: Jazz
- Length: 39:41
- Label: Enja; ENJA 3073
- Producer: Prince Lasha

Prince Lasha chronology
The Cry! (1962)	Inside Story (1981)	Insight (1966)

Inside Story is an album by saxophonist Prince Lasha, recorded in 1965 but not released on the Enja label until 1981. The compact disc (Enja CD 9131-2) appends the album Search for Tomorrow, a 1974 live album recorded at the Berkeley Jazz Festival, and previously released as Live At Berkeley Jazz Festival Vol. 2 (Birdseye 99001).

== Reception ==
Professional ratings
Review scores
Source	Rating
AllMusic	3/5 stars
The Penguin Guide to Jazz Recordings	3/4 stars

The AllMusic review by Scott Yanow stated that "this obscure set features flutist Prince Lasha in prime form. ...The inside/outside music has its free moments and solidifies the leader's position as one of the best flutists in the avant-garde movement of the period".

== Track listing ==
All compositions by Prince Lasha

1. "Ethereal" - 7:13
2. "Flight" - 7:15
3. "Kwadwo Safari" - 7:36
4. "Inside Story" - 8:04
5. "Mary" - 9:31

The CD configuration appends three tracks from Search for Tomorrow:

6. "For the Child" - 8:55
7. "Search for Tomorrow" - 6:13
8. "Mayflower" (a.k.a. "Tracking Train") - 16:16

== Personnel ==
=== Inside Story ===
- Prince Lasha - alto saxophone, flute
- Herbie Hancock - piano
- Cecil McBee - bass
- Jimmy Lovelace - drums

=== Search for Tomorrow ===
- Prince Lasha - alto saxophone, flute, baritone saxophone
- Hubert Eaves - piano
- Ron Carter - bass
- Roy McCurdy - drums
- Kenneth Nash - percussion
