= Spirit Dance (Michael White album) =

Studio album by Michael White
- Released: 1972
- Recorded: September 21, 1971
- Studio: Wally Heider, San Francisco
- Genre: Jazz
- Length: 41:14
- Label: Impulse! ASD 9281
- Producer: Ed Michel

Michael White chronology
| Spirit Dance (1972) | Pneuma (1972) |

Professional ratings
Review scores
| Source | Rating |
|---|---|
| Allmusic | 3/5 stars |

Spirit Dance is the debut album by American violinist and composer Michael White featuring performances recorded in 1971 and released on the Impulse! label.

== Track listing ==
All compositions by Michael White except as indicated

1. "Spirit Dance" – 3:18
2. "The Tenth Pyramid" – 4:39
3. "John Coltrane Was Here" (Baba Omson) – 6:08
4. "Ballad for Mother Frankie White" – 7:23
5. "Samba" – 9:00
6. "Unlocking the Twelfth House" – 7:28
7. "Praise Innocence" – 3:18

== Personnel ==
- Michael White – violin, vocals
- Ed Kelly – piano
- Ray Drummond – bass
- Baba Omson – percussion, bamboo flute, vocals
- Makeda King, Wanika King – vocals (track 7)
