= Frost Giant (album) =

Studio album by the Dead Science
- Released: October 25, 2005
- Recorded: 2004
- Length: 47:12
- Label: Absolutely Kosher
- Producer: Ryan Hadlock

The Dead Science chronology
Xiu Xiu/The Dead Science split 7-inch (2004)	Frost Giant (2005)	Crepuscule With The Dead Science (2006)

Professional ratings
Review scores
Source	Rating
Pitchfork	7.4/10
PopMatters	8/10
Prefix	3.5/5
Tiny Mix Tapes	4/5 marks

Frost Giant is the second studio album from the Dead Science, released in 2005 on Absolutely Kosher Records. It was recorded at Bear Creek Studio over ten days in December 2004. Korum Bischoff drummed on some tracks, Nick Tamburro on others.

== Track listing ==
1. "Last Return" – 2:48
2. "In the Hospital" – 3:45
3. "Drrrty Magneto" – 4:06
4. "Sam Mickens' Dreams" – 4:13
5. "The Future, Forever (Until You Die)" – 3:52
6. "Blood Tuning" – 5:10
7. "Black Stockings" – 4:20
8. "Lil' Half Dead" – 6:12
9. "Lead to Gold in the Hour of Chaos" – 3:03
