= Staying on the Watch =

Studio album by Sonny Simmons
- Released: August 30, 1966
- Recorded: 1966
- Genre: Jazz
- Length: 43:01
- Label: ESP-Disk Cat # 1030
- Producer: Bernard Stollman

Sonny Simmons chronology
Staying on the Watch (1966)	Music from the Spheres (1968)

Staying on the Watch is the debut album by jazz musician Sonny Simmons. It was released as ESP-1030 on the ESP-Disk label in 1966. The cover photograph is a mirror image displaying Simmons playing left handed against the NYC skyline.

The album was included in the 2005 compilation The Complete ESP-Disk Recordings.

== Reception ==
Professional ratings
Review scores
Source	Rating
AllMusic	3.5/5 stars
DownBeat	4/5 stars
All About Jazz #1	4/5 stars
All About Jazz #2	4/5 stars

Colin Larkin, writing in The Virgin Encyclopedia of Jazz considered the album "a masterpiece of new jazz".

In a review for AllMusic, Alex Henderson wrote: "Simmons' playing is delightfully uninhibited and free-spirited on four original compositions... That isn't to say that Staying on the Watch is an exercise in atonal chaos... This is inside/outside playing (more outside than inside) rather than absolute atonality from start to finish. But even so, there is a lot of intensity coming from Simmons and the four musicians who form an acoustic quintet with him... Simmons' recording career as a leader was off to an exciting start with Staying on the Watch."

A DownBeat reviewer called the album "a scorcher," and praised "City of David," stating: "John Hicks... pulls the music in a more John Coltrane-inspired direction... stoking a fire that makes bassist Teddy Smith and drummer Marvin Pattillo simply steam."

Writing for All About Jazz, Raul D'Gama Rose commented: "Sonny Simmons embraces music with his whole body, soul, mind and spirit; that much is clear from Staying on the Watch... Simmons has always stood in the future to look back at his lonely African-ness, and he coaxed a storm to remind anyone who would listen that the harshness of life could be turned into something raw, beautiful and memorable for its beauty rather than its ugliness... Staying on the Watch is tinted with distinct shades of an approach that is more mystical and all-embracing; a wholly captivating experience."

In a separate article for All About Jazz, Jerry D'Souza wrote: "Sonny Simmons... could fathom a cry of anguish just as easily as he could herald a shout of joy, as he created an ambience that spread its wings to encompass melody and lyricism. This balance is seen to advantage on Staying on the Watch... Simmons had the perfect musical partner in trumpeter Barbara Donald, his wife at the time. She was propulsive, churning out dynamic lines that created a language of her own while complementing the outpourings of the alto sax. Pianist John Hicks was in the early stages of his career; his melodic touch is, nevertheless, in evidence and he plays a key role in the development of these compositions... Simmons stands tall as he marks his territory, with freedom and restraint, in a potent program."

== Track listing ==
All compositions by Sonny Simmons

1. "Metamorphosis" – 11:38
2. "A Distant Voice" – 7:23
3. "City of David" – 15:03
4. "Interplanetary Travelers" – 9:20

== Personnel ==
- Sonny Simmons – alto saxophone
- Barbara Donald – trumpet
- John Hicks – piano
- Teddy Smith – bass
- Marvin Patillo – drums
