= Sholi =

- Origin: Davis, California
- Genres: Indie, alternative, experimental
- Years active: 2005–present
- Label: Quarterstick Records
- Members: Payam Bavafa; Jonathon Bafus; Eric Ruud; Danny Milks
- Website: www.sholi.com

Sholi is an American indie/alternative/experimental group that originated in Davis, California, and now has members dispersed throughout the San Francisco Bay Area. The members include primary songwriter Payam Bavafa, drummer Jonathon Bafus, and bassist Eric Ruud, occasionally with keyboardist Greg Hagel. In autumn of 2008, Sholi signed to Quarterstick Records / Touch and Go Records. Their full-length debut, produced with Greg Saunier of Deerhoof, was released on February 17, 2009.

== Discography ==
- Sholi EP (self-released)
- Sholi / The Dead Science Split 7" with The Dead Science (2006), KDVS Recordings
- Hejrat 7" (2008), Holocene Music
- Dreams Before People Tour EP (2008)
- Sholi (2009), Quarterstick Records
