= Glen Echo Creek =

Glen Echo Creek Cemetery Creek
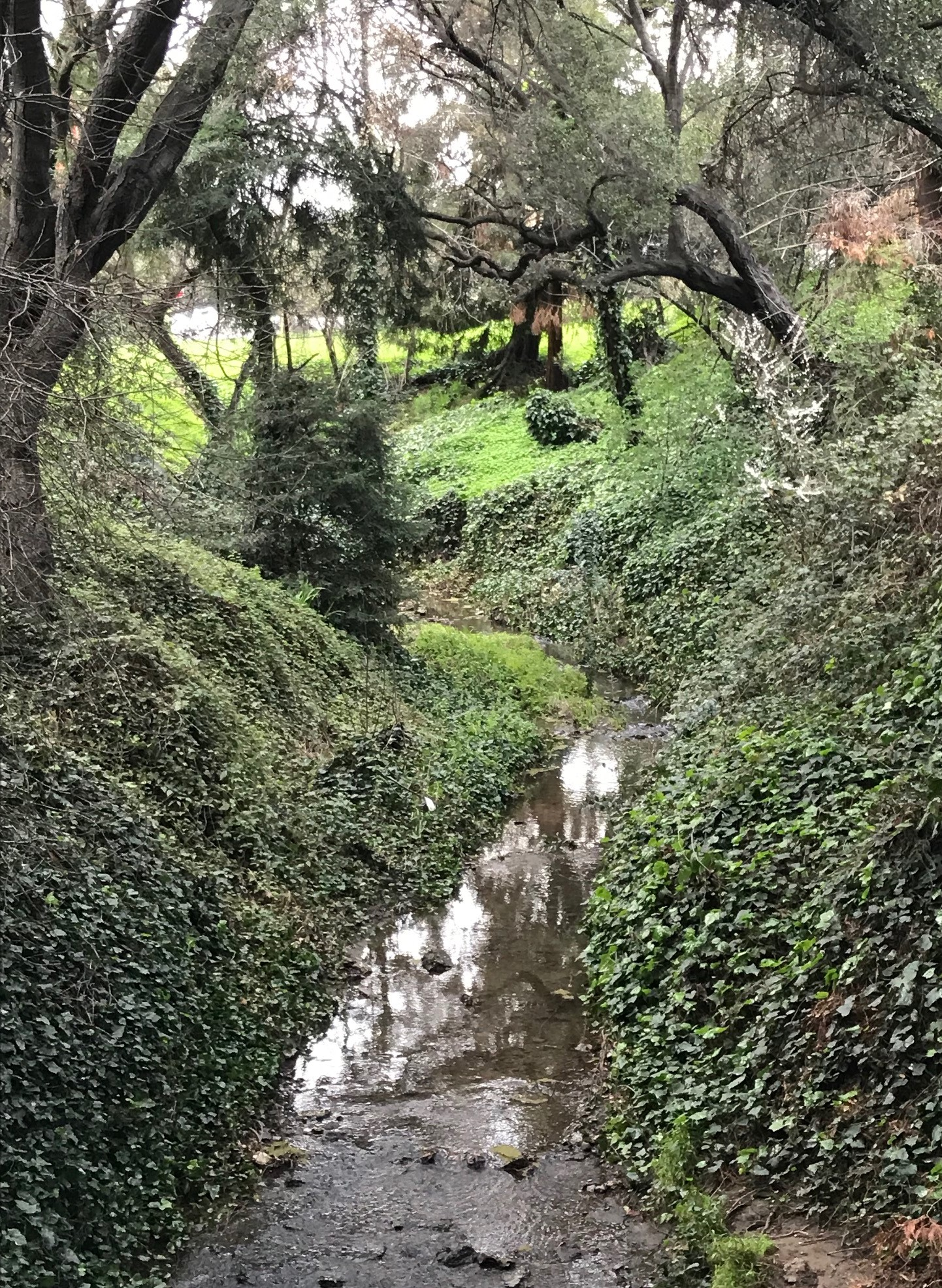
- A section of Glen Echo Creek in Oak Glen Park

Location
- Country: United States
- State: California
- County: Alameda
- City: Oakland

Physical characteristics
- Source: Oakland Hills
- Mouth: Lake Merritt
  - coordinates: 37°48′38″N 122°15′42″W
- Basin size: 2.6 mi^{2} (6.7 km^{2})

Basin features
- Tributaries
  - left: Rockridge Branch, Broadway Branch

Glen Echo Creek (also known as Cemetery Creek) is a creek that runs from the Oakland Hills to Lake Merritt in Oakland, California. Although most of it is underground, the creek does surface in several locations. It has two branches, the Rockridge Branch and the Broadway Branch.

== Watershed and geography ==
Glen Echo Creek is part of the 2.6-square-mile Glen Echo Creek Watershed and drains parts of Upper Rockridge, Piedmont Avenue, and Piedmont. Both the main creek and its Rockridge Branch start in the Oakland Hills around the Rock Ridge outcroppings. Glen Echo Creek runs past the Mountain View Cemetery, then through the Piedmont Avenue neighborhood, where it surfaces for a stretch that includes the Glen Echo Creek Park pocket park. After continuing underground in a culvert, it again surfaces at Oak Glen Park along Richmond Boulevard between Westfall Avenue and Randwick Avenue. From there, it continues mostly underground to Lake Merritt.

The Rockridge Branch flows from the hills to a pond near Pleasant Valley Avenue and then continues as the Broadway Branch. It surfaces briefly near 38th Street and Manila Avenue before continuing under Mosswood Park and eventually joining the main creek near Lake Merritt.

== History ==
In 1905, inspired by the City Beautiful Movement, developers Frank and Wickham Havers purchased and protected the Oak Glen Park area, which contains a 1,500-feet section of the creek surrounded by live oaks. A stone bridge and pergola were added in 1911, but have fallen into disrepair.

Piedmont Avenue residents first worked to protect Glen Echo Creek in 1976, when the Alameda County Flood Control and Water Conservation District proposed to pave over and redevelop the open-air section of creek that would later become Glen Echo Creek Park. In 1984, the creek was damaged by bulldozers deployed by the flood control district. A woman lay in front of the bulldozers, stopping them, and she was then able to garner support from neighborhood groups to successfully oppose the project. The flood control district then had to repair the damage. The section of creek was stabilized and restored, and replanted with native riparian plants and redwood, maple, and alder trees. By 2001, this section of the creek was again in disrepair, and was again restored by Oakland in 2002.

In 2015, the East Bay Municipal Utility District accidentally spilled 140 cubic yards of cement into the creek in Upper Rockridge. EBMUD was fined by the California Regional Water Quality Control Board but not criminally charged.

In 2022, Chinook salmon were seen attempting to spawn in the creek near Lake Merritt.

== See also ==
- List of watercourses in the San Francisco Bay Area
