= Villainaire =

Studio album by The Dead Science
- Released: September 2008
- Recorded: 2008
- Length: 40:00
- Label: Constellation Records
- Producer: Jherek Bischoff

The Dead Science chronology
Crepuscule with the Dead Science (2006)	Villainaire (2008)

Professional ratings
Review scores
Source	Rating
PopMatters	4/10
Sonic Dice	4/6
Three Imaginary Girls	8.7/10
Treble	Album of the Week
XLR8R	8.5/10 (Staff Pick)

Villainaire is the third full-length album from The Dead Science, released in 2008 on Constellation Records.

== Track listing ==
1. "Throne Of Blood (The Jump Off)" – 3:40
2. "The Dancing Destroyer" – 2:50
3. "Make Mine Marvel" – 3:36
4. "Monster Island Czars" – 3:41
5. "Lamentable" – 2:40
6. "Death Duel Productions" – 3:15
7. "Wife You" – 4:38
8. "Holliston" – 3:46
9. "Black Lane" – 3:31
10. "Sword Cane" – 4:57
11. "Clemency" – 3:31

== Guest musicians ==
(in order of appearance)

- Monica Schleyv – Harp
- Morgan Henderson – Synth
- Katrina Ford – Voice
- Paris Hurley – Violin
- Alex Guy – Viola
- Lori Goldston – Cello
- The Horns of Orkestar Zirkonium:
- Stephen Lohrentz – Trumpet
- Sam Boshnack – Trumpet
- Ivan Molton – Alto Saxophone
- Jeff Walker – Trombone
- Kate Ryan – Voice
- Craig Wedren – Voice
