= Submariner (album) =

Studio album by The Dead Science
- Released: July 2003
- Recorded: 2002
- Length: 47:12
- Label: Absolutely Kosher, Woodson Lateral (LP)
- Producer: The Dead Science, Chadwick Dahlquist

The Dead Science chronology
Galactose (1999)	Submariner (2003)	Bird Bones In The Bughouse (2004)

Professional ratings
Review scores
Source	Rating
AllMusic	3/5 stars
Tiny Mix Tapes	5/5 stars

Submariner is the debut studio album from The Dead Science, released in 2003 on Absolutely Kosher Records. Its contributors include jazz musician Michael White.

== Track listing ==
1. "Unseeing Eye" – 7:04
2. "White Cane" – 3:40
3. "White Train" – 4:17
4. "The Ghost Integrity" – 4:43
5. "Below" – 4:53
6. "Batty" – 4:17
7. "Girl With the Unseen Hand" – 4:48
8. "Threnody" – 3:45
9. "Tension at Pitch" – 7:26
10. "Envelope" – 2:20
