= Oakland Heritage Alliance =

American non-profit organization

Oakland Heritage Alliance (OHA) is an American non-profit organization based in Oakland, California. OHA advocates the preservation of Oakland's historical sites and "cultural, natural, and architectural heritage", organizes walking tours and lectures, and monitors new development projects.

OHA began in 1980 with a bankroll of $150 and seven individuals. Founding members were involved in the Oakland Cultural Heritage Survey which was funded by a 1979 state grant. The organization's earliest advocacy included a campaign surrounding the Metcalf House, a mansion which was eventually moved from Adams Point to West Oakland to avoid its demolition.

Membership costs $45.

== Advocacy ==
OHA petitioned for the 16th Street train station to be listed on the National Register of Historic Places, and has argued for restoring the abandoned station. In response to a proposed housing development near the station, OHA argued that the development should be modified to include restoring the station and to avoid obscuring the station's baggage wing.

OHA advocated against a proposed housing development on the former site of the Oakland campus of the California College of the Arts, in the Rockridge neighborhood. It also advocated against a 3100-unit housing development on Oakland's waterfront.

OHA argued against the Eastline development in downtown Oakland, saying that it was too close to historic buildings.

== Other activities ==
- The organization gives Partners in Preservation awards annually to "individuals, organizations, projects, and programs whose work demonstrates a commitment to excellence in historic preservation".
- Walking tours are open to the public for a fee and to OHA members or volunteers for free or at a discount. Most walking tours take place on Saturdays and Sundays in the summer.
- Open house tours are similar to walking tours but offer the chance to see inside a handful of private homes each of which exemplify a particular architectural style common to the tour's focus.
- Oakland Heritage Alliance publishes a quarterly newsletter: OHA News.
