= Bird Bones in the Bughouse =

EP by The Dead Science
- Released: October 2004
- Recorded: ????
- Length: 47:12
- Label: Absolutely Kosher
- Producer: ????

The Dead Science chronology
Submariner (2003)	Bird Bones in the Bughouse (2004)	Xiu Xiu/The Dead Science split 7-inch (2005)

Bird Bones in the Bughouse is the second EP from The Dead Science, released in 2004 on Absolutely Kosher Records. It includes a cover of Terence Trent D'Arby's "Sign Your Name" featuring Jamie Stewart on back-up vocals.

== Track listing ==
1. "Ossuary" – 4:47
2. "Gamma Knife" – 4:51
3. "Film Strip Collage" – 5:28
4. "Cuz She's Me" – 5:23
5. "Sign Your Name" – 6:04
