= Prince Lasha =

American jazz musician (1929–2008)

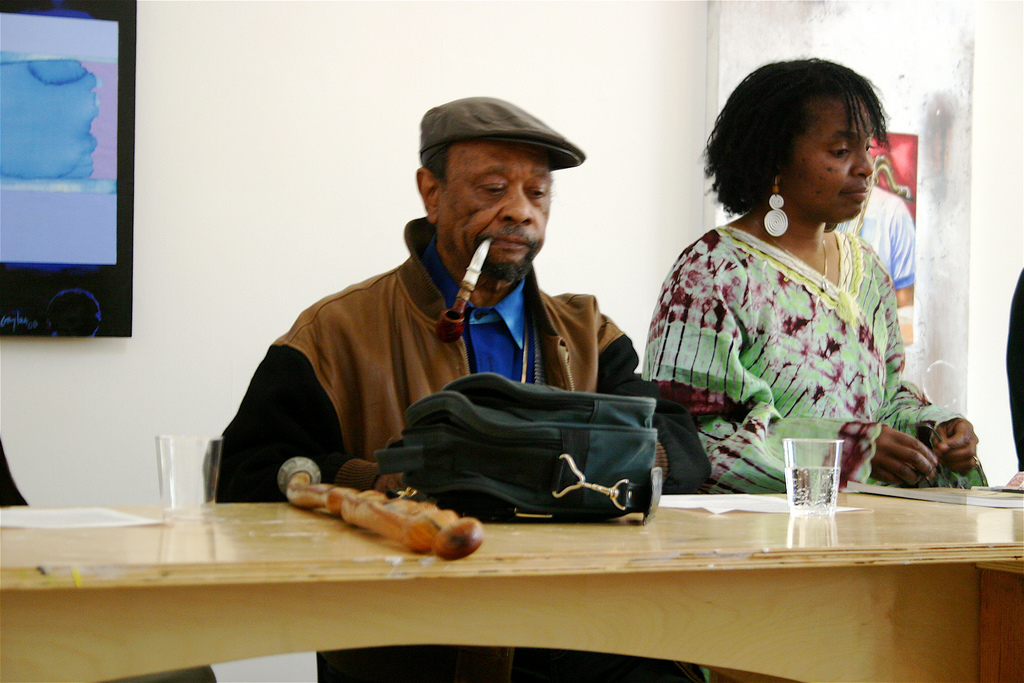
- Prince Lasha and Wanda Sabir

Background information
- Born: William Lawsha; September 10, 1929; Fort Worth, Texas, United States
- Died: December 12, 2008 (aged 79) Oakland, California, United States
- Genres: Jazz, free jazz, avant-garde jazz
- Occupation: Musician
- Instruments: Alto saxophone, flute, clarinet, alto flute, piccolo
- Formerly of: Sonny Simmons, Eric Dolphy, Elvin Jones, Jimmy Garrison

William B. Lawsha, better known as Prince Lasha (/ləˈʃeɪ/), (September 10, 1929 – December 12, 2008) was an American jazz alto saxophonist, baritone saxophonist, flautist, clarinetist and English horn player.

== Life and career ==
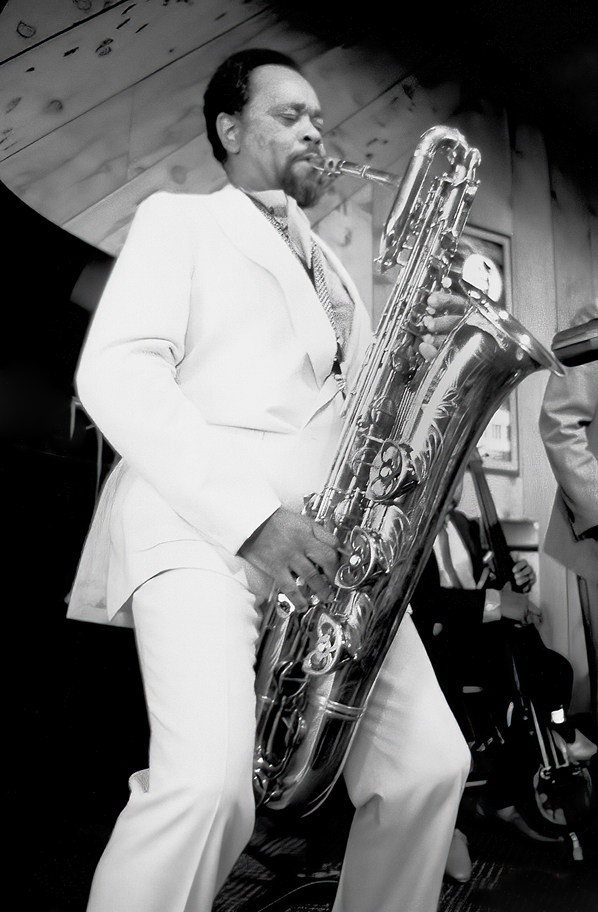
Prince Lasha in 1988

He was born in Fort Worth, Texas, where he came of age studying and performing alongside fellow I.M. Terrell High School students John Carter, Ornette Coleman, King Curtis, Charles Moffett, and Dewey Redman.

Lasha moved to California during the 1950s. In the 1960s, he was active in the burgeoning free jazz movement, of which his Fort Worth cohort Ornette Coleman was a pioneer. Lasha recorded with Eric Dolphy (Iron Man and Conversations, both in 1963) and the Elvin Jones/Jimmy Garrison Sextet featuring McCoy Tyner (Illumination!, also in 1963).

Lasha moved to Europe and in 1966 was based in Kensington, London, The album Insight (1966) by the Prince Lasha Ensemble was recorded in England and featured local musicians, including Bruce Cale, Dave Willis, Jeff Clyne, Rick Laird, Joe Oliver (drums), David Snell (harp), Mike Carr, Stan Tracey, John Mumford (trombone) and Chris Bateson (trumpet).

Returning to the US in 1967, Lasha worked closely with saxophonist Sonny Simmons, with whom he recorded two albums, The Cry! (1962) and Firebirds (1967), for Contemporary Records. The latter album received five stars and an AMG Albumpick at Allmusic.

In the 1970s, Lasha and Simmons made additional recordings under the name Firebirds. In 2005, Lasha recorded the album The Mystery of Prince Lasha with the Odean Pope Trio. Lasha died on December 12, 2008, in Oakland, California.

== Discography ==
=== As leader ===
- The Cry! (Contemporary, 1962) with Sonny Simmons
- Inside Story (Enja 3073, 1965 [1981])
- Insight (CBS SBPG 62409, 1966)
- Firebirds (Contemporary, 1967) with Sonny Simmons
- Firebirds, Live at the Berkeley Jazz Festival Vol. 1 (Birdseye series 99001, 1974)
- Firebirds, Live at the Berkeley Jazz Festival Vol. 2 (Birdseye series 99001, 1974) (also released as Search for Tomorrow (Enja 4008, 1982))
- Firebirds, And Now Music (daagnimRecords LP09, 1983) with Dennis Gonzalez / Webster Armstrong
- The Mystery of Prince Lasha with the Odean Pope Trio - CIMP, 2005

=== As sideman ===
With Gene Ammons

- Brasswind (Prestige, 1974)

With Eric Dolphy

- Iron Man (1963)
- Conversations (1963)

With Elvin Jones / Jimmy Garrison

- Illumination! (1963)

With Michael White

- The Land of Spirit and Light (Impulse!, 1973)

With Dennis Gonzalez

- Witness (daagnim Records LP08, 1983)
