= Blaak Heat =

French-American musical group

- Origin: Los Angeles/Paris
- Genres: Psychedelic rock, Progressive rock, Surf rock, experimental
- Years active: 2008–present
- Labels: Svart Records; Tee Pee Records; Improvising Beings
- Members: Thomas Bellier; Mike Amster; Guillaume Théoden; Nicolas Heller; Henry Evans
- Past members: Tom Davies; Antoine Morel-Vulliez; Timothée Gacon
- Website: Blaak Heat official website

Blaak Heat (formerly known as Blaak Heat Shujaa) is a French-American musical group whose recordings blend psychedelic rock with a number of outside sources, such as traditional Middle Eastern music, progressive rock, surf rock, spaghetti western, and metal.

The band was founded by Thomas Bellier and Antoine Morel-Vulliez in 2008 in Paris while they were graduate students at Sciences Po. In 2012, the band relocated to Los Angeles, signed to Tee Pee Records, and subsequently hired Orange County-based drummer Mike Amster. Blaak Heat has toured Europe and the United States, appearing at festivals such as Levitation Austin, Reverence Valada, and Red Smoke Fest. The band collaborated with Nobel Prize-nominated Gonzo poet Ron Whitehead on two of their releases, leading to multiple live appearances with Whitehead in the US and Scandinavia. Blaak Heat's latest full-length album, Shifting Mirrors, was produced by Grammy Award-winning producer Matt Hyde and came out in the Spring of 2016. It has been called "A new standard for a new generation" by PopMatters and "Almost too good to be believed" by Loudwire.

== Members ==
=== Current members ===
- Thomas Bellier - guitar, vocals (2008–present)
- Mike Amster - drums (2012–present)
- Guillaume Théoden - bass (2016–present)
- Nicolas Heller - guitar (2016–present)
- Henry Evans - bass (2015–present)

=== Former members ===
- Tom Davies - bass (2015)
- Antoine Morel-Vulliez - bass (2008-2014)
- Timothée Gacon - drums (2008-2012)

== Discography ==
=== Albums ===
- Blaak Heat Shujaa - 2010 - Improvising Beings
- The Edge Of An Era - 2013 - Tee Pee Records
- Shifting Mirrors - 2016 - Svart Records, Tee Pee Records

=== Extended plays ===
- The Storm Generation - 2012 - Tee Pee Records
