= Robert Stewart (saxophonist) =

American saxophonist

Background information
- Born: Robert Darrin Stewart; 17 August 1969 (age 56); Oakland, California, United States
- Genres: Jazz, soul, blues, Middle Eastern, R&B, avant-garde
- Occupation: Musician
- Years active: 1986–2016 retired
- Labels: Qwest, Warner Bros., Red, Nagel-Heyer, Exodus, World Stage, Armageddon
- Website: www.professorrobertstewart.org

Robert Darrin Stewart is an American saxophonist. He recorded several albums under his own name during the period 1994–2006. He has also recorded as a sideman, including on trumpeter Wynton Marsalis' Blood on the Fields. Stewart went on multiple national and world tours during his 30-year career as a performer, both under his own name and with the Marsalis band.

== Early life ==
Stewart was born in Oakland, California on August 17, 1969. His mother was from Louisiana, and his biological father, Bob Stewart, was a San Francisco Conservatory trained flutist and trumpeter. Stewart says that his mother began teaching him to read from the Qur'an when he was three years old; the Bible was his next reading task, and he went on to study other major religions.

Stewart first played the flute as a hobby; his primary passion was basketball during his grade school years. He stated that he "played flute in high school because it was easy to hide from my friends who were all into sports". His high school music teacher encouraged him to play jazz.

The summer after his graduation from Fremont High School, he was listening to the radio and heard tenor saxophonist John Coltrane playing "Russian Lullaby"; the next song was "All Too Soon" played by tenor saxophonist Ben Webster. The contrast in sound between these two men, playing the same instrument, fascinated Stewart; he then remembered his high school teacher's words and focused on jazz. After the summer of 1986, Stewart began to frequent jam sessions with Oakland Bay Area pianist Ed Kelly. There he met saxophonist Pharoah Sanders, who became his first mentor, giving him technical advice and encouraging him to continue and advance his playing.

== Performance career ==
Stewart playing in Italy.

In New York, Stewart played with trumpeter Roy Hargrove. In 1991, he performed with drummer Max Roach's ensemble. In 1992, Stewart performed with McCoy Tyner (piano), Bobby Hutcherson (vibes), Freddie Hubbard (trumpet), Milt Jackson (vibes), Billy Higgins (drums), and organist Jimmy Smith. Stewart also joined the Los Angeles-based group Black-Note for an eight-month stint, and performed with trombonist Delfeayo Marsalis and drummer Brian Blade that same year. Others he had played with by 1995 include Buddy Montgomery, Chico Freeman, and Donald Byrd. Jazz critic Jason Ankeny said that Stewart was "One of the most impressive hard bop tenor saxophonists to emerge during the 1990s".

In 1993, Stewart was asked to tour with the New York-based group The Harper Brothers led by drummer Winard Harper. This was his first national band tour. By the end of 1994, he began touring nationally under his own name.

Stewart's highest profile engagement that year came after joining trumpeter Wynton Marsalis' big band, the Jazz at Lincoln Center Orchestra, to perform Blood on the Fields, including on the recording that won the Pulitzer Prize for Music. He also performed on the album They Came to Swing. He was part of the Blood on the Fields tour of the United States and Europe in 1997.

In 1997, Stewart played weekly at San Francisco venues such as Club Deluxe and Bruno's, and had a gig with vocalist Jon Hendricks doing a Bread and Roses benefit inside the former Alcatraz Island Federal Penitentiary. In June 1997, Stewart's quartet included drummer Billy Higgins for a concert at The Museum of Contemporary Art in Los Angeles. The previous year, Higgins was reported as saying that Stewart was "perhaps the most important young artist to come along in decades."

Stewart performed with guitarist Patrick Greene for President Bill Clinton and First Lady Hillary Clinton at a Democratic fundraiser in Woodside, California in 1998. He backed up Dizzy Gillespie in one of Gillespie's final concerts. In his 30-year performance career he toured the world multiple times.

== Recording career ==
Stewart's first album as leader was Judgement, for World Stage Records. The recording featured Higgins, pianist Eric Reed, and bassist Mark Shelby. Jazz writer Scott Yanow wrote: "Even on the up-tempo tunes, Stewart is often content to emphasize his warm tone and to hold long notes, taking his time to get his message across. [...] this is a pleasing modern mainstream effort." In 1994, Stewart recorded Beautiful Love Ballads for Red Records of Italy; it was released in 1998.

Stewart's first album for Quincy Jones's Qwest Records was In the Gutta, in 1996. Saxophonist Dave Liebman, on hearing it, reported enthusiastically that Stewart sounded like a player from an older generation. Stewart's next album with Qwest was The Force, with drummer Jeff "Tain" Watts, bassist Reginald Veal, and pianist Ed Kelly (his first teacher). According to Stewart, Qwest delayed its release for almost two years and then did not promote it, because of its Islamic influences.

In 2000, Stewart recorded Nat the Cat, a tribute to Nat "King" Cole that featured Kelly (piano), Mark Williams (bass), Sly Randolph (drums), and family members Kevin Stewart (piano) and Robert Stewart III (flute). Stewart's 2003 album The Movement was a concert recording that was also Higgins's final recording. In 2003, Stewart recorded Heaven and Earth for Nagel-Heyer Records. This was essentially a smooth jazz record, and several of the thirteen songs were Stewart originals. The AllMusic reviewer stated that there is "a positive social message that runs through the songs [...] Perhaps Stewart has found a way to combine new age politics with new age music, creating a hybrid that seems almost natural."

== Post-performance career ==
Stewart retired from recording and performing at the end of 2016 in order to write religious books, teach, and travel.

== Discography ==
=== As leader ===
- Judgement (World Stage, 1994)
- In the Gutta (Qwest/Warner Bros., 1996)
- The Force (Qwest/Warner Bros., 1998)
- Beautiful Love Ballads (Red, 1998)
- Nat the Cat (Red, 2000)
- The Movement (Exodus, 2002)
- Heaven and Earth (Nagel-Heyer, 2004)
- Happy Birthday Trane (Armageddon, 2006)
- Invitation (Armageddon, 2006)
- Evolution (Armageddon, 2006)
- Don't Move the Groove! (Volume 1 – Organ Funk) (Armageddon, 2006)
- Don't Move the Groove! (Volume 2 – Organ Blues) (Armageddon, 2006)

Compilations

- 25th Red Records Anniversary – Un Filo Rosso Nel Jazz (Red, 2003)
- Ballads 2004 (Nagel-Heyer, 2004)
- Red Records : The Color of Jazz (Red, 2009)
- 30 Jazz Love Standards (Red, 2010)
- Relaxin' Jazz (Red, 2010)
- Red Records 35th Anniversary (Red, 2011)

Video

- Marsalis on Music Video Series, Columbia Films (1995)
- Sessions at West 54th, PBS Television (1997)
- South Bank Show (Blood on the Fields), Bravo Television (1995)

=== As a member ===
Jazz at Lincoln Center Orchestra

- They Came to Swing (Columbia, 1994)
- Blood on the Fields (Columbia, 1995)

Big Belly Blues Band

- Nobody's Home (Chump Change, 2014)

=== As sideman ===
With David Leshare Watson

- Live at Lo Spuntino (Music in the Vines, 2002) – live
- David Leshare Watson Loves Swinging Soft & the Ballads (Music in the Vines, 2003)

With Paul Tillman Smith

- Fonky Times (Chump Change, 2014)
- A Beautiful Heart (Chump Change, 2017)

With others

- Buddy Conner, Can't Hide Love (Seaside, 1996)
- Jay Johnson, Full Swing Ahead (Deluxe, 1998)
- Wynton Marsalis, The Music of America: Wynton Marsalis (Sony, 2012)[2CD]
- Lady Memfis, Expressions of a Legacy (Effania Brown, 2001)
- Pharoah Sanders, Eddie Marshall, Ed Kelly & Pharoah Sanders (Evidence, 1992)
