= Ron Whitehead =

American poet

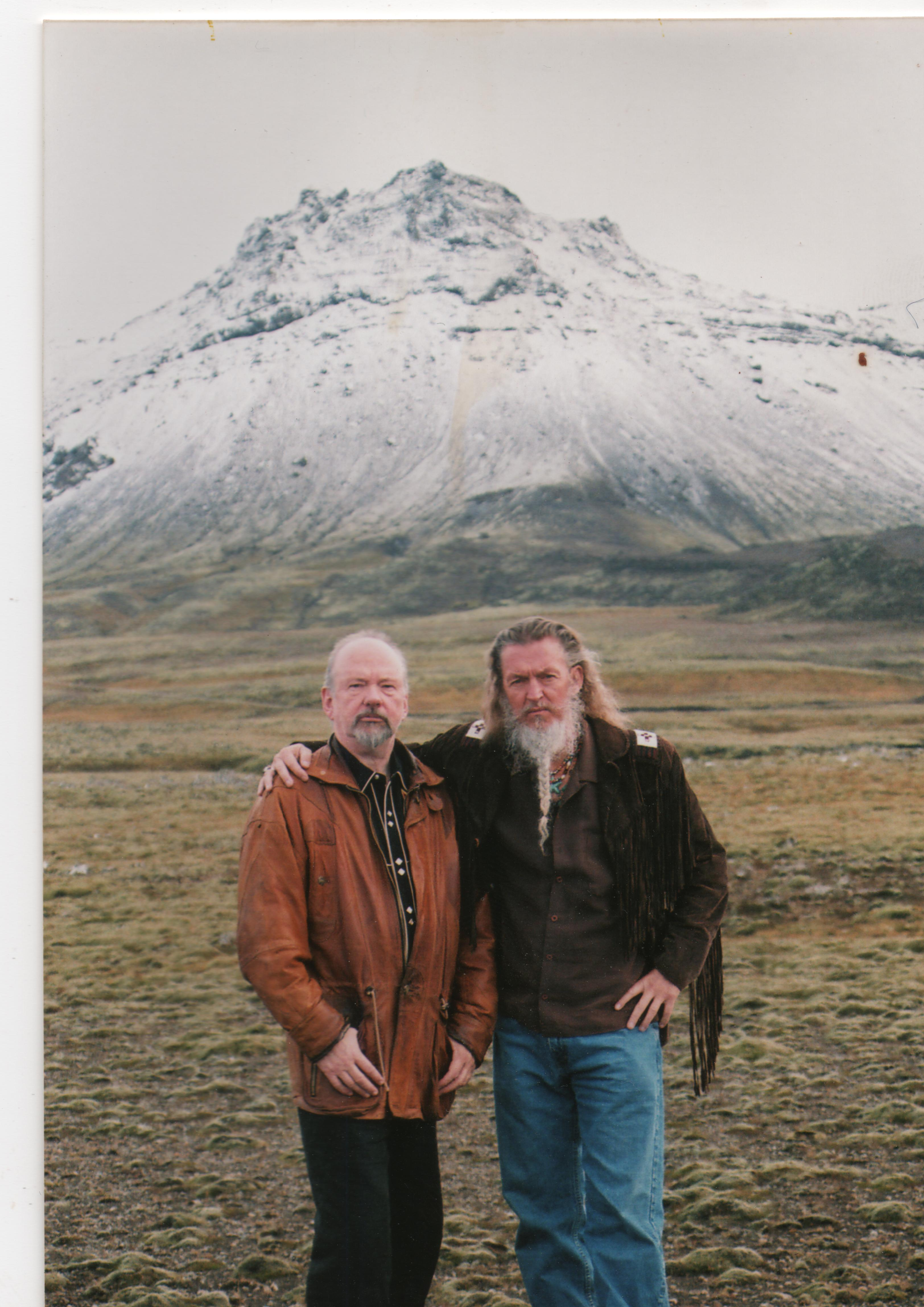
Ron Whitehead (right)

Ron Whitehead is an American poet, author and activist. Whitehead was born on a farm in Kentucky, but traveled to the University of Louisville and Oxford University to pursue his academic interests.

== Career ==
Ron Whitehead has been involved in many aspects of the artistic field; writing poetry, editing literary works, organizing a non-profit organization to support literature worldwide called the Global Literary Renaissance, teaching and lecturing to students, and collaborating with artists and musicians, focusing primarily on the Louisville art scene and Kentucky folk art. Whitehead was also the honorary poetry editor of GonzoToday.com.

Whitehead has authored thirty titles which include: Western Kentucky: Lost & Forgotten, Found & Remembered (with Sarah Elizabeth Burkey), The Third Testament: Three Gospels of Peace (with art by Lawrence Ferlinghetti & David Minton), Beaver Dam Rocking Chair Marathon, The Wanderer, and most recently, The Storm Generation Manifesto & on parting, the wilderness poems. In 2016 Finishing Line press released his work, Kentucky Basketball is Poetry in Motion, a collection of poems about the history and culture of Kentucky basketball. The Ron Whitehead poetry collection is currently managed by the University of Louisville. A special exhibit of works produced by Whitehead, "Poets, Rock Stars, and Holy Men" was featured at the main branch of the Louisville Free Public Library in 2018 and Whitehead was honored at that event for his work in the arts by Louisville Mayor Greg Fischer.

Whitehead has also released forty CDs which include: "Tapping My Own Phone", "Kentucky Roots", "Kentucky: poems, stories, songs", "Kentucky Blues", "I Will Not Bow Down", "Exterminate Noise", "From Iceland to Kentucky & Beyond", "Swan Boats @ Four", "The Shape of Water", "The Viking Hillbilly Apocalypse Revue", "Walking Home", "I Refuse", "Ron Whitehead and Southside's Southside Lounge", "Ron Whitehead and Southside's We Are The Storm", and "The Storm Generation Manifesto & on parting, the wilderness poems". Whitehead's book, titled The Storm Generation Manifesto and on parting, the wilderness poems, was released in July 2010 and includes a CD of his readings as well as his first DVD.

Whitehead has also been involved in production of musical and poetry events worldwide. Some of these events include days long music and poetry readings called "Insomniac-a-thons", benefit concerts, and International and National Poetry Festivals in locations such as London, New York City, and the Netherlands. Whitehead's most notable production was the Official Hunter S. Thompson Tribute, which featured individuals such as Johnny Depp, David Amram, and Roxanne Pulitzer. and he has participated in a yearly "Gonzofest" in Thompson's hometown of Louisville, Kentucky honoring Thompson.

He has collaborated with many musicians as well, doing readings of his work with other artists. Whitehead has worked with musical artists ranging from Icelandic musicians Sigur Rós and Utangarðsmenn, to Jim James of My Morning Jacket and Lee Ranaldo of Sonic Youth. One of his most recent collaborations was with heavy psychedelic rock group Blaak Heat, on their EP The Storm Generation and following album The Edge of an Era. In March 2019, Glass Eye Ensemble featuring Sheri Streeter mounted a multi-media music, video and art installation using Whitehead's poetry as a springboard for creative collaboration; the world premiere of which was held at the Tim Faulkner Gallery in Louisville, Kentucky.

Whitehead has also continued to be involved in the academic world through working as an editor and a professor. He has edited thousand of works by authors such as Jimmy Carter, Jack Kerouac, Andy Warhol, Allen Ginsberg, and Lawrence Ferlinghetti. Whitehead has also taught at various institutions of higher education including the University of Louisville, New York University, Trinity College Dublin, and the University of Iceland.

== Awards and accolades ==
Whitehead has been honored for his work as a writer and his involvement in the literary community. Some of his accolades include The All Kentucky Poetry Prize, The Yeats Club of Oxford's Prize for Poetry, a nomination for the Pulitzer Prize twice, and a nomination for the Nobel Prize in Literature. Whitehead's work has been featured prominently on the international scene. In 2002 his poem "Never Give Up" was the featured theme for the United Nations affiliated program called "Poetry on the Peaks." This poem has been featured in other venues including National Geographic magazine and a book written by the 14th Dalai Lama. In 2009 Ron was one of the one hundred and thirty featured poets representing fifty countries at the International Poetry Festival, which took place in Granada, Nicaragua. Whitehead's work has been published in other venues as well, including Northwestern's TriQuarterly magazine, England's Beat Scene, and Japan's Blue Beat Jacket. Whitehead's work is also featured in Delinda Buie's archive at the University of Louisville Library.

In 2019, Whitehead was appointed to serve as Kentucky's Beat Poet Laureate for the years 2019–2021 by the National Beat Poetry Foundation. He is the first writer from the United States to be tapped as writer-in-residence for the City of Literature international residency program in Tartu, Estonia. In May 2021, Whitehead was named U.S. National Beat Poet Laureate for 2021–2022 by the National Beat Poetry Foundation.

== Bibliography ==
SELECTED PRINT AND AUDIO PUBLICATIONS:

POETRY IN PRINT:

- I WILL NOT BOW DOWN, Hozomeen Press, New London, Connecticut
- BLOOD FILLED VESSELS RACING TO THE HEART, Hozomeen Press, New London, Connecticut
- THE DECLARATION OF INDEPENDENCE THIS TIME: Selected Poems 1996–2000, Hozomeen Press, New London, Connecticut
- WESTERN KENTUCKY: Lost & Forgotten, Found & Remembered, Published in Heaven, Kentucky
- THE THIRD TESTAMENT: Three Gospels of Peace,
- Published in Heaven, Kentucky (with art by Lawrence Ferlinghetti & David Minton)
- BEAVER DAM ROCKING CHAIR MARATHON: 2 books, 4 editions, 4 different publishers, bop bam book press, NYC & Published in Heaven Books, Kentucky & Cook Creative, California
- KOKOPELLI, House Press, Calgary, Canada
- THE WANDERER, Published in Heaven Books
- THE STORM GENERATION MANIFESTO & on parting, the wilderness poems (with cd companion), HollandBrown Books
- WE SEE THE SOUND OF SETTING SUN, SkyLeaf Media
- GHOST LOVER, TRANCE MISSION, SkyLeaf Media
- SEARCHING FOR JACK KEROUAC, SkyLeaf Media
- I REFUSE I WILL NOT BOW DOWN I WILL NEVER GIVE UP, Cook Creative, California
- THE STORM GENERATION, Poems by Outlaw Poet Ron Whitehead (in English & Estonian), NonGrata/Estonia
- MAMA: A POET'S HEART IN A KENTUCKY GIRL, Trance Mission Press, Clarksville, Indiana
- blistered asphalt on dixie highway: Kentucky Basketball is Poetry in Motion (Finishing Line Press/Kentucky)
- QUEST FOR SELF IN THE OCEAN OF CONSCIOUSNESS: Ibsen, Hamsun, Munch, Joyce: The Origins of Modernism and Expressionism (Cook Creative Press/Kentucky)
- DISOBEY (with Jinn Bug) (Underground Books/NYC)
- “I'd Never Shoot A Man While He's Washing Dishes: Arcturian Love Songs” (Long Steel Rail Press/Kentucky)
- A Taoist Nun Teaches Me in Fourteen Poems (Underground Books/NYC)
- The Path of The Ancient Skald (Underground Books/NYC)
- KENTUCKY BOUND: poems, stories, and songs (TranceMission Press/Indiana)
- NIGHTS AT THE MUSEUM/Ööd muuseumis(with Jinn Bug)(TranceMission Press/Indiana USA and Kirjastus Utoopia/Tartu Estonia )

AUDIO RECORDINGS:

- TAPPING MY OWN PHONE
- KENTUCKY ROOTS
- KENTUCKY: poems, stories, songs
- KENTUCKY BLUES
- I WILL NOT BOW DOWN
- EXTERMINATE NOISE
- FROM ICELAND TO KENTUCKY & BEYOND
- SWAN BOATS @ FOUR
- THE SHAPE OF WATER
- THE VIKING HILLBILLY APOCALYPSE REVUE
- WALKING HOME
- I REFUSE
- Ron Whitehead and SOUTHSIDE's SOUTHSIDE LOUNGE
- Ron Whitehead and SOUTHSIDE's WE ARE THE STORM double cd
- THE STORM GENERATION MANIFESTO & on parting, the wilderness poems: audio book recording, (Holland Brown Books/companion to new book and DVD, 2010 release)
- THE BONEMEN: Thomas Bellier and Ron Whitehead
- TRANCE MISSION
- SEARCHING FOR JACK KEROUAC (Logan Street Recordings/Kentucky
- Frogg Corpse & Mr. Stranger present The End of The World, with The Storm Generation Band (Gonzo Today Records/Kentucky)
- PRAYER with Harry Pickens on piano and Aaron West on violin (sonaBLAST Records/Kentucky)
- Ron Whitehead & The Storm Generation Band present The Storm Generation Manifesto & Other Rock and Roll Poems (sonaBLAST Records)
- Ron Whitehead & The Storm Generation Band present DRAGONS (sonaBLAST Records)
- Songs & Poems from The KENTUCKY BOUND Concert (sonaBLAST Records)
- THE DANCE—Ron Whitehead & Glass Eye Ensemble feature Sheri Streeter (sonaBLAST Records/Howard & Nancy Bruner Wilson release)
