= Mosswood Park =

Park in Oakland, California, U.S.

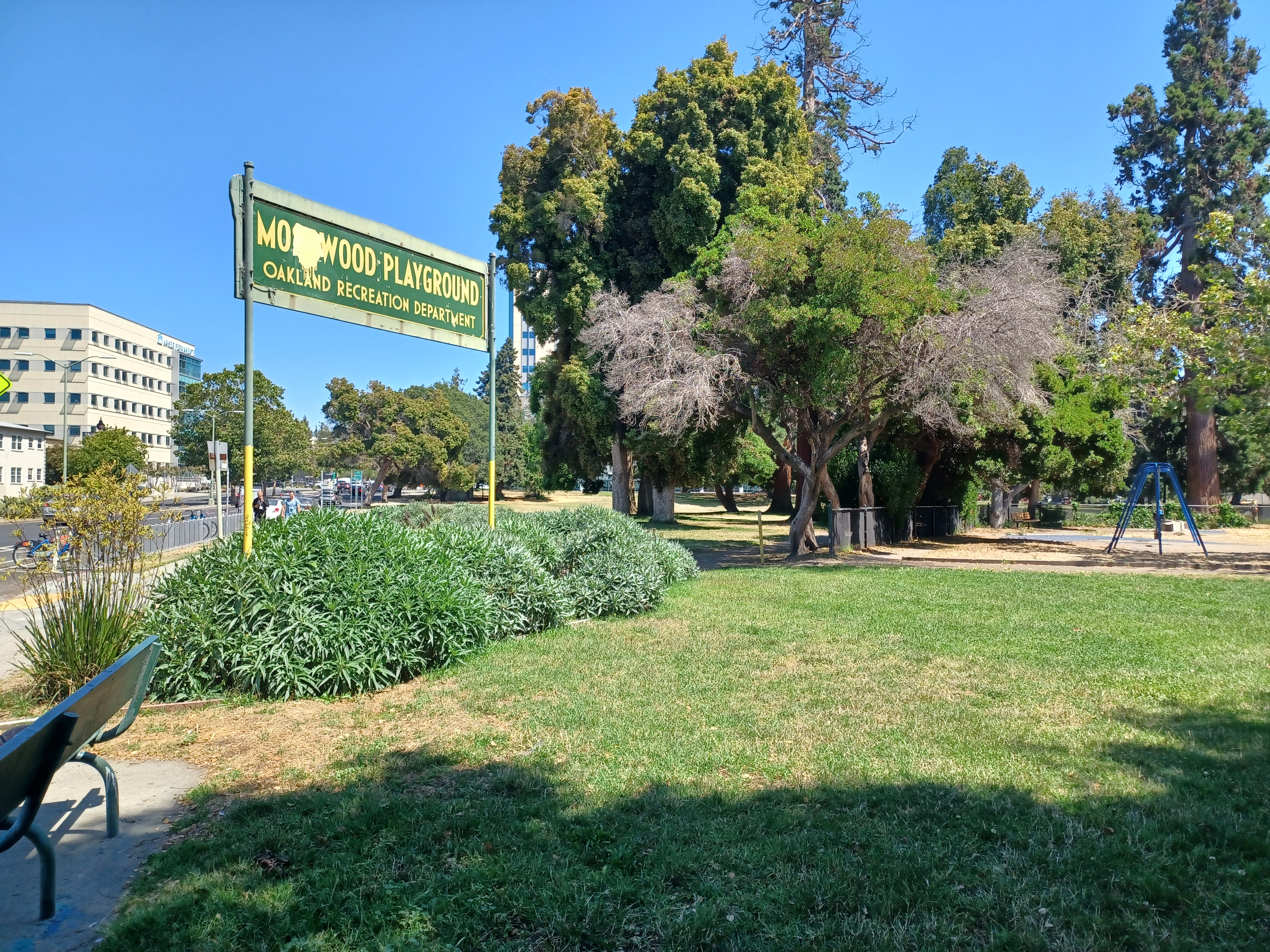
- Mosswood Park in Oakland, California
- Interactive map of Mosswood Park
- Type: Public park
- Location: 3612 Webster Street, Oakland, California, USA
- Coordinates: 37°49′26″N 122°15′36″W
- Area: 4-acre (16,000 m^{2})
- Created: 1907
- Operator: Oakland Department of Parks and Recreation

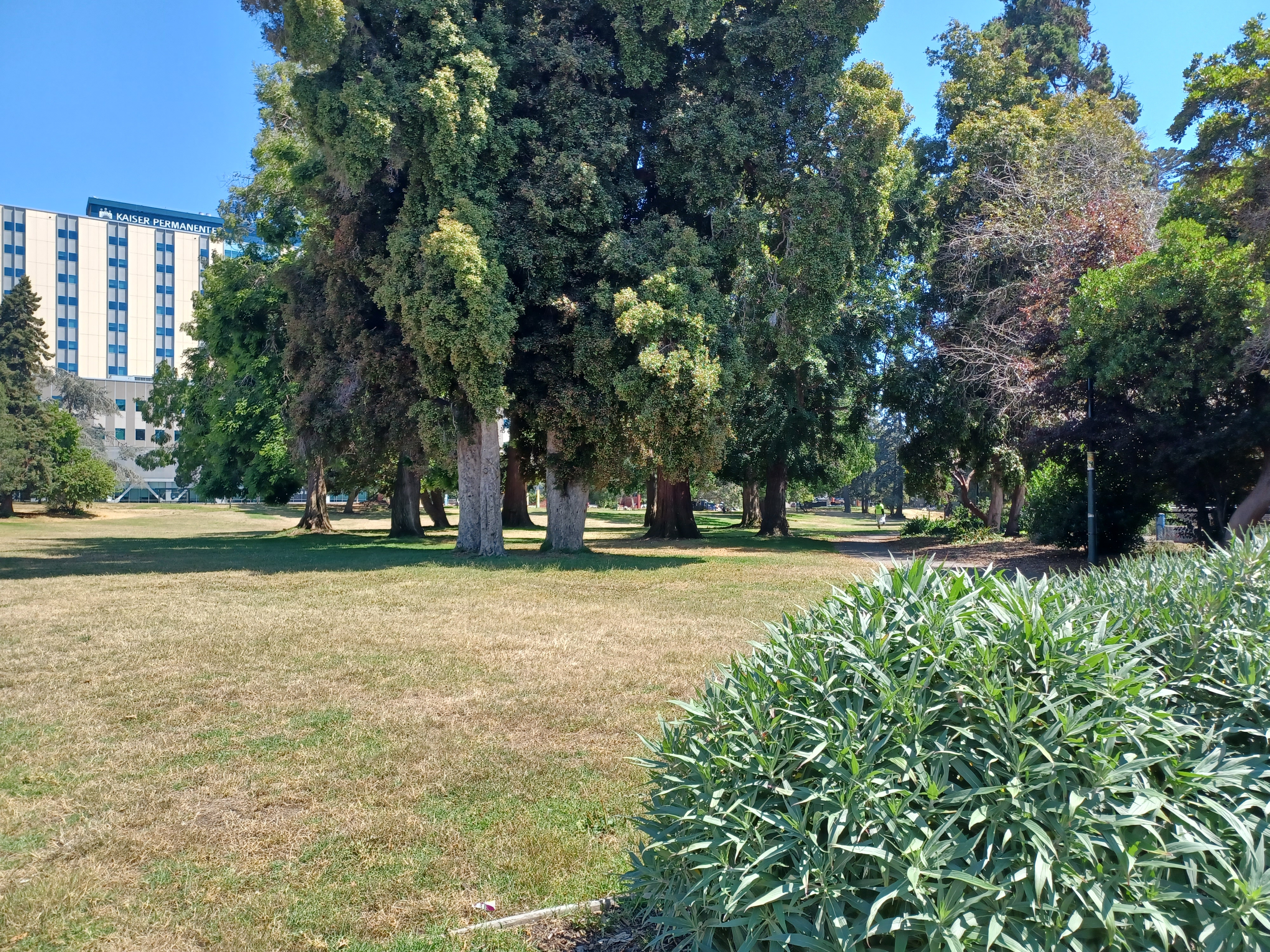
Mosswood Park

Mosswood Park is a 4-acre (16,000 m^{2}) public park in Oakland, California, located on W MacArthur Boulevard between Webster Street and Broadway. Managed by the City of Oakland's Department of Parks and Recreation, it contains a community recreation center as well as extensive grassy lawns, picnic areas, children's play equipment, dog runs, tennis and basketball courts, and baseball fields.

Programs at the park include after-school tutoring for grades K-7, along with numerous other after-school classes.

Mosswood Park is situated on the former estate of J. Mora Moss, who built a Carpenter Gothic style mansion there in 1864. After he married Julia Wood, he combined their two surnames to name it Mosswood. The mansion, an Oakland Heritage Landmark, still stands but is in poor repair and is used for office and storage space by the Parks and Recreation Department.

The city purchased a portion of the estate, including the house, in 1907 for use as a park. Over the years the park was augmented with two amphitheaters and a decorative pergola. During the 1950s there were children's plays in one of the amphitheaters every week, put on by the Mosswood Children's Theatre Teen Troupe. However, that amphitheater was demolished in the 1960s when Interstate 580 was built and an on-ramp was constructed through that part of the park.

The neighborhood around Mosswood Park is also called Mosswood. The neighborhood is bound by the Grove Shafter Freeway to the west, Broadway Street to the east, 40th Street to the north, and MacArthur Freeway to the south. MacArthur Boulevard runs through the center of the Mosswood neighborhood.

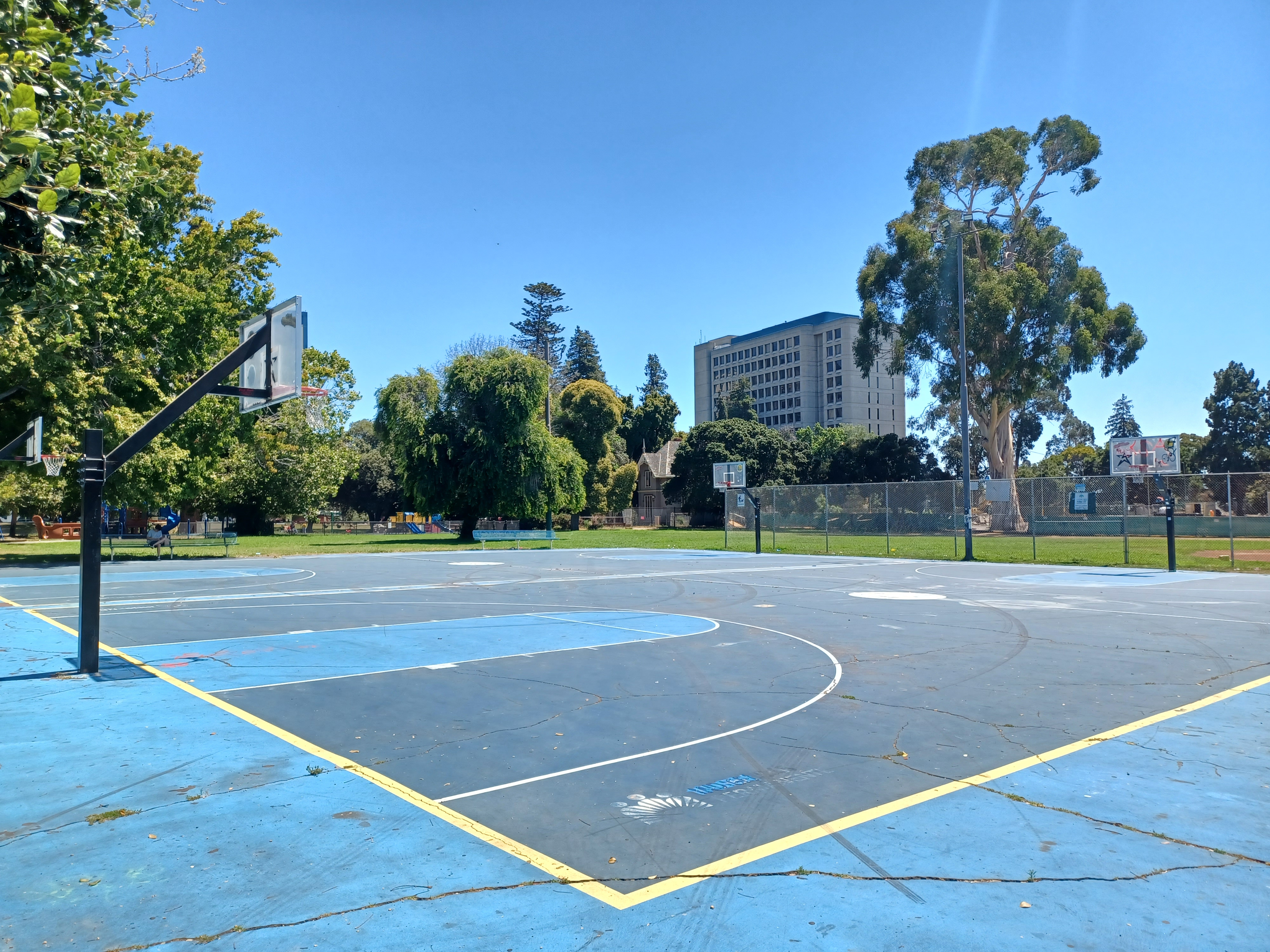
Basketball courts at the park
