= Sonny Simmons =

American saxophonist (1933–2021)

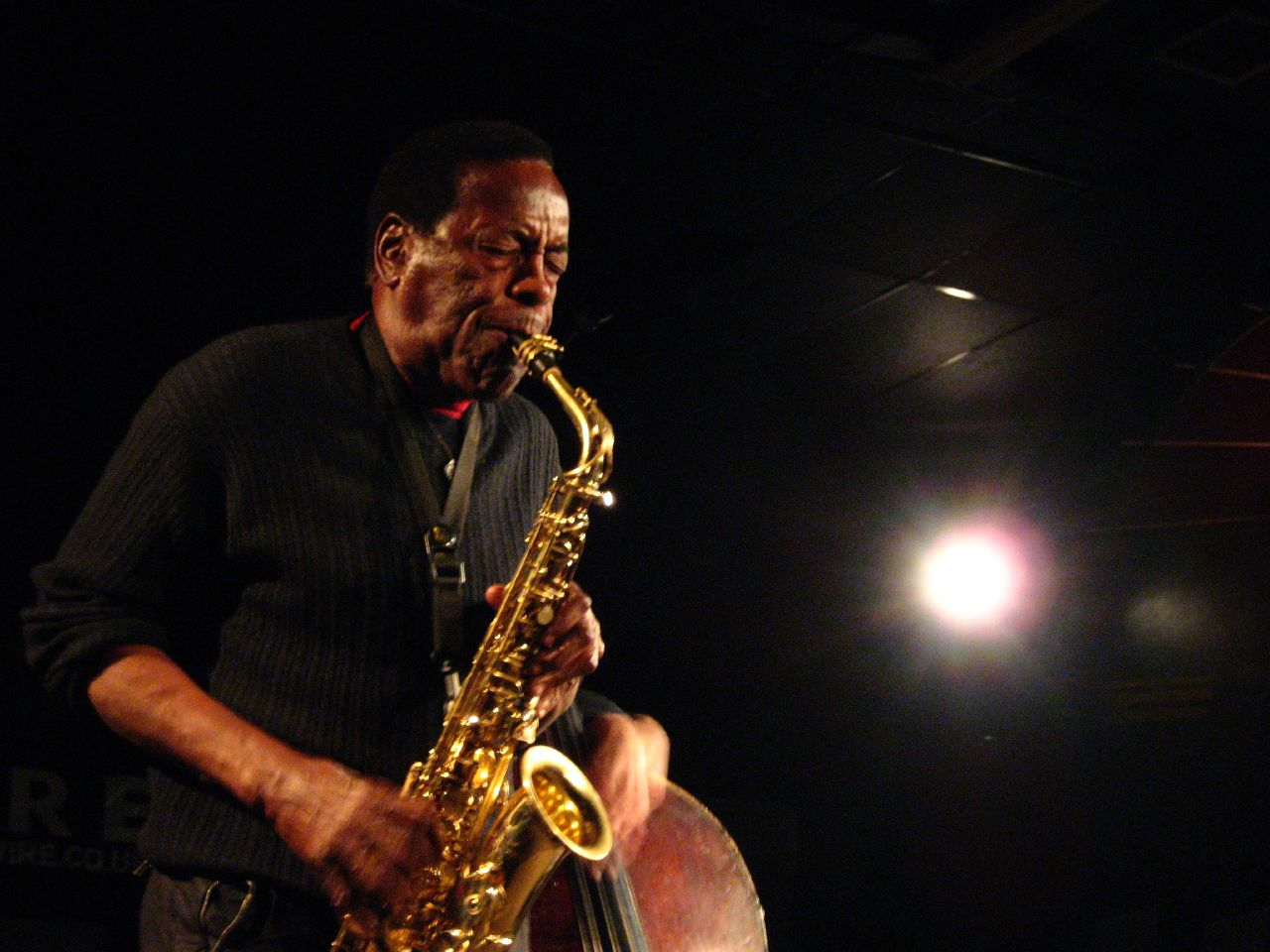

Background information
- Born: Huey Simmons; August 4, 1933; Sicily Island, Louisiana, U.S.
- Died: April 6, 2021 (aged 87)
- Genres: Jazz, free jazz
- Occupation: Musician
- Instruments: Alto saxophone, English horn
- Labels: Contemporary, ESP-Disk, Arhoolie, Qwest, CIMP, Marge, Boxholder, Jazzaway, Marge, Improvising Beings
- Website: sonnysimmons.org

Huey "Sonny" Simmons (August 4, 1933 – April 6, 2021) was an American jazz musician.

== Biography ==
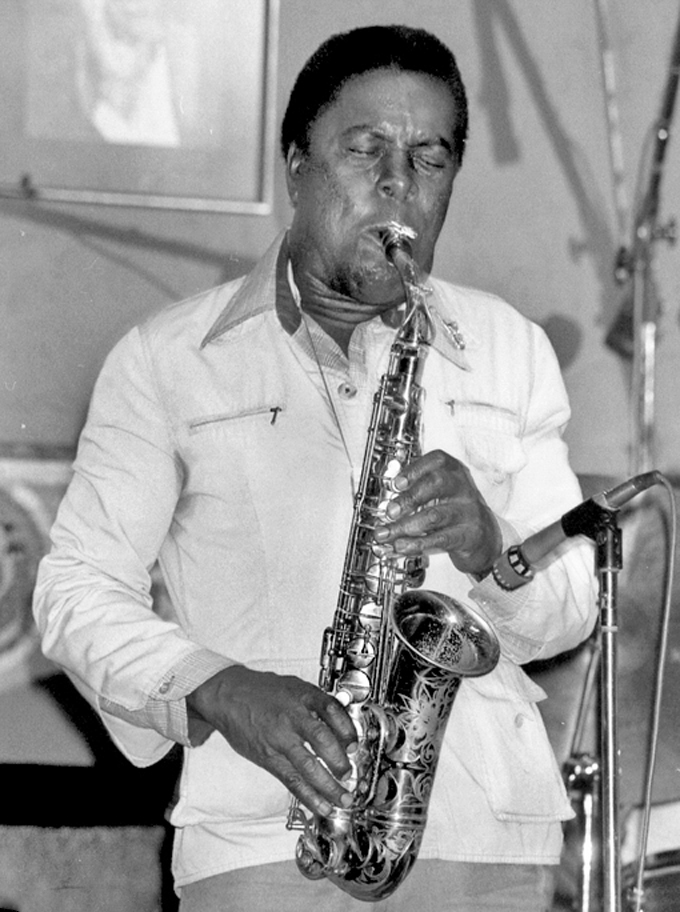
Sonny Simmons at Keystone Korner, San Francisco CA 10/22/80

Simmons was born on August 4, 1933, in Sicily Island, Louisiana. He grew up in Oakland, California, where he began playing the English horn. (Along with Vinny Golia, Simmons was among the few musicians to play the instrument in a jazz context.) At age 16 he took up the alto saxophone, which became his primary instrument. Simmons played primarily in an avant-garde style, often delving into free jazz.

His then-wife, Barbara Donald, played trumpet on several of his early records, including his ESP-Disk titles Staying on the Watch and Music from the Spheres; Arhoolie title Manhattan Egos, and Contemporary titles Rumasuma and the double album Burning Spirits.

Simmons also partnered with Prince Lasha on several recordings, two of which – The Cry! (1963) and Firebirds (1968) – were released by Contemporary.

Personal problems derailed both his music career and home life, leading to divorce and homelessness. He busked on the streets of San Francisco for many years, until he resurrected his career in the early 1990s and began playing in night clubs again.

His resurgence in the mid-1990s was marked by two albums, Ancient Ritual and American Jungle, for Quincy Jones' Qwest Records, along with regular appearances in European jazz festivals such as the Moers Festival and Saalfelden Jazz Festival.

From 2000, he was co-leader of The Cosmosamatics with reed player Michael Marcus. Simmons was the subject of the 2003 documentary film In Modern Time -- a Sonny Simmons Story by Robert Brewster. In 2008, he received a Lifetime Achievement Award from the American Jazz Foundation. Simmons died on April 6, 2021, in New York.

== Discography ==
=== As leader ===
- Staying on the Watch (ESP-Disk, 1966)
- Music from the Spheres (ESP-Disk, 1968)
- Manhattan Egos (Arhoolie, 1968)
- Rumasuma (Contemporary, 1969)
- Burning Spirits (Contemporary, 1971)
- Backwoods Suite (West Wind, 1982)
- Global Jungle (Deal With It, 1990)
- Backwoods Suite (West Wind, 1990)
- Ancient Ritual (Qwest/Reprise, 1994)
- Live in Paris (Arhoolie, 1994)
- Transcendence (Creative Improvised Music Projects, 1996)
- Judgement Day (Creative Improvise Music Projects, 1996)
- American Jungle (Qwest/Warner Bros, 1997)
- Live at the Knitting Factory (Ayler, 2001)
- Mixolydis (Marge, 2001)
- Jewels (Boxholder, 2004)
- The Future Is Ancient (2004)
- The Traveler (Jazzaway, 2005)
- Cheshire Cat Club + Olympia - 1980 (Hello World!, 2006)
- I'll See You When You Get There (Jazzaway, 2006)
- Last Man Standing (Jazzaway, 2007)
- Ecstatic Nostalgia (Hello World!, 2007)
- Performs the Music of Charlie Parker (Zingmagazine, 2007)
- Introducing Black Jack Pleasanton (Hello World!, 2008)
- Atomic Symphony (Jazzaway, 2009)
- Symphony of the Peacocks (Improvising Beings, 2011)
- Beyond the Planets (Improvising Beings, 2013)
- Leaving Knowledge, Wisdom and Brilliance / Chasing the Bird (Improvising Beings, 2014)

With The Cosmosamatics (also featuring Michael Marcus)

- The Cosmosamatics (Boxholder, 2001)
- The Cosmosamatics Two (Boxholder, 2002)
- Cosmosamatics Three (Boxholder, 2002 and 2003)
- Live at Banlieues Bleues (Bleu Regard, 2003)
- Magnitudes (Soul Note, 2003))
- Zetrons (Not Two, 2004)
- Reeds & Birds (Not Two, 2004)
- Free Within the Law (Not Two, 2007)
- Jazz Maalika (Saptakjazz, 2013)

With Moksha Samnyasin

- Nomadic (Svart, 2014)

With Bobby Few

- True Wind (Hello World!, 2007)

With Horace Tapscott

- Tapscott Simmons Quartet - Among Friends (Jazz Friends, 1999)

With Brandon Evans

- Universal Prayer / Survival Skills (Parallactic, 1999)
- A Salute to Ustad Bismillah Khan (Parallactic, 2001)
- Tales of the Ancient East (Parallactic, 2001)

With Brandon Evans and Anthony Braxton

- Anthony Braxton / Sonny Simmons / Brandon Evans / Andre Vida / Mike Pride / Shanir Blumenkranz (Parallactic, 2003)

=== As sideman ===
With Prince Lasha

- The Cry! (Contemporary, 1962)
- Firebirds (Contemporary, 1967)
- Firebirds: Live at Monterey Jazz Festival, Vol. III (Birdseye, 1970)

With Elvin Jones/Jimmy Garrison

- Illumination! (Impulse!, 1963)

With Eric Dolphy

- Conversations (FM, 1963)
- Iron Man (Douglas International, 1963)

With Robert Stewart

- Happy Birthday Trane (Armageddon, 1999)

With Svein Olav Herstad Trio

- Suite for Simmons (Jazzaway, 2006)

Collaboration With Clifford Jordan/Don Cherry/Prince Lasha

- It Is Revealed (Zounds, 1963)
