= The Dead Science =

Experimental pop band

- Years active: 1999-2015, 2023
- Labels: Absolutely Kosher; Constellation
- Members: Jherek Bischoff; Nick Tamburro; Sam Mickens
- Past members: Korum Bischoff (1999-2005); Serena Tideman, cello (1999)

The Dead Science (formerly The Sweet Science) was an experimental pop band based in Seattle.

The band consists of guitarist/vocalist Sam Mickens, Jherek Bischoff on bass and Nick Tamburro on drums. Jherek Bischoff's brother Korum was the drummer from the band's inception in 1999 through 2005. Tamburro, who'd shared drumming duties with him on the recording of Frost Giant and had previously acted as The Dead Science's touring drummer, joined permanently upon his departure. Korum is still credited on the band's label page with "guidance, stability and sometimes drums."

Their music is heavily influenced by their training as jazz musicians and involvement in the avant-garde music of a number of artists, most notably Xiu Xiu and Degenerate Art Ensemble. Mickens has also cited Prince as an influence on his vocal style, often noted in reviews of the bands' work for its use of falsetto.

The trio self-released their limited-run debut EP, Galactose, under their original moniker, The Sweet Science, before giving up the name due to a cease-and-desist order from another band. Following the name change, The Dead Science released their debut album, Submariner, on Absolutely Kosher Records in 2003. This was followed by the release of their second EP, Bird Bones in the Bughouse, in 2004, their second album, Frost Giant, in 2005, and a third EP Crepuscule with The Dead Science in 2006. They were also named winner in the 'Jazz/Experimental' category in Seattle Weekly's 2006 Music Awards.

In 2008, the band signed to Constellation Records, with whom they released their third album, Villainaire.

The band reunited in 2023 for a performance commemorating the 20th anniversary of Submariner.

== Discography ==
Albums:

- 2003 Submariner (Absolutely Kosher)
- 2005 Frost Giant (Absolutely Kosher)
- 2008 Villainaire (Constellation)

EPs:

- 1999 Galactose (self-released, as The Sweet Science)
- 2004 Bird Bones in the Bughouse (Absolutely Kosher)
- 2006 Crepuscule with The Dead Science (Slender Means Society)

7" Records:

- 2006 split 7-inch with Xiu Xiu (Deathbomb Arc)
- 2007 split 7-inch with Sholi (KDVS)
- 2007 split 7-inch with Parenthetical Girls (Obsolete Vernacular)
- 2007 7-inch Tomlab Alphabet Series: The Letter V (Tomlab)
- 2008 7-inch Throne of Blood (The Jump Off) (Constellation)

Compilation Appearances:

- 2002 Mass Transit (as The Sweet Science) (Woodson Lateral)
- 2005 YETI Magazine #3 compilation
- 2007 The Second Marriage Records Compilation (Marriage)
- 2008 David Shrigley's Worried Noodles (Tomlab)

Mixtapes:

- Date Unknown Ponies in a Stable
- 2008 School Of Villainy - The Villainaire Prequel
