= Impulse! Records discography =

Discography for the American jazz record label Impulse! Records. Original releases had the A- prefix for the mono release and AS- for the stereo.

== Discography ==
=== Original series ===
Catalog number	Artist	Title
A-1	J. J. Johnson & Kai Winding	The Great Kai & J. J.
A-2	Ray Charles	Genius + Soul = Jazz
A-3	Kai Winding	The Incredible Kai Winding Trombones
A-4	Gil Evans	Out of the Cool
A-5	Oliver Nelson	The Blues and the Abstract Truth
A-6	John Coltrane	Africa/Brass
A-7	Art Blakey	Art Blakey!!!!! Jazz Messengers!!!!!
A-8	Max Roach	Percussion Bitter Sweet
A-9	Gil Evans	Into the Hot
A-10	John Coltrane	Live! at the Village Vanguard
A-11	Quincy Jones	The Quintessence
A-12	Benny Carter	Further Definitions
A-13	Curtis Fuller	Soul Trombone
A-14	Milt Jackson	Statements
A-15	Count Basie	Count Basie and the Kansas City 7
A-16	Max Roach	It's Time
A-17	Jackie Paris	The Song Is Paris
A-18	McCoy Tyner	Inception
A-19	Manny Albam	Jazz Goes to the Movies
A-20	Shelly Manne	2-3-4
A-21	John Coltrane	Coltrane
A-22	Curtis Fuller	Cabin in the Sky
A-23	Roy Haynes	Out of the Afternoon
A-24	Michael Brown	Alarums and Excursions
A-25	Oscar Brand	Morality
A-26	Duke Ellington	Duke Ellington Meets Coleman Hawkins
A-27	Freddie Hubbard	The Artistry of Freddie Hubbard
A-28	Coleman Hawkins	Desafinado
A-29	Chico Hamilton	Passin' Thru
A-30	John Coltrane & Duke Ellington	Duke Ellington & John Coltrane
A-31	George Wein	George Wein & the Newport All-Stars
A-32	John Coltrane	Ballads
A-33	McCoy Tyner	Reaching Fourth
A-34	Coleman Hawkins	Today and Now
A-35	Charles Mingus	The Black Saint and the Sinner Lady
A-36	Various Artists	Americans in Europe Vol. 1
A-37	Various Artists	Americans in Europe Vol. 2
A-38	Freddie Hubbard	The Body & the Soul
A-39	McCoy Tyner	Nights of Ballads & Blues
A-40	John Coltrane & Johnny Hartman	John Coltrane and Johnny Hartman
A-41	Paul Gonsalves	Cleopatra Feelin' Jazzy
A-42	John Coltrane	Impressions
A-43	Sonny Stitt	Now!
A-44	Beverly Jenkins	Gordon Jenkins Presents My Wife the Blues Singer
A-45	Art Blakey	A Jazz Message
A-46	Gary McFarland	Point of Departure
A-47	Gloria Coleman	Soul Sisters
A-48	McCoy Tyner	Live at Newport
A-49	Elvin Jones & Jimmy Garrison	Illumination!
A-50	John Coltrane	Live at Birdland
A-51	Shirley Scott	For Members Only
A-52	Sonny Stitt & Paul Gonsalves	Salt and Pepper
A-53	Freda Payne	After the Lights Go Down Low and Much More!!!
A-54	Charles Mingus	Mingus Mingus Mingus Mingus Mingus
A-55	Paul Gonsalves	Tell It the Way It Is!
A-56	Yusef Lateef	Jazz 'Round the World
A-57	Johnny Hartman	I Just Dropped By to Say Hello
A-58	Terry Gibbs	Take It from Me
A-59	Chico Hamilton	Man from Two Worlds
A-60	Charles Mingus	Mingus Plays Piano
A-61	Johnny Hodges	Everybody Knows Johnny Hodges
A-62	Lorez Alexandria	Alexandria the Great
A-63	McCoy Tyner	Today and Tomorrow
A-64	Clark Terry	The Happy Horns of Clark Terry
A-65	Ben Webster	See You at the Fair
A-66	John Coltrane	Crescent
A-67	Shirley Scott	Great Scott!!
A-68	J. J. Johnson	Proof Positive
A-69	Yusef Lateef	Live at Pep's
A-70	Milt Jackson	Jazz 'n' Samba
A-71	Archie Shepp	Four for Trane
A-72	Billy Taylor & Quincy Jones	My Fair Lady Loves Jazz
A-73	Shirley Scott	Everybody Loves a Lover
A-74	Johnny Hartman	The Voice That Is!
A-75	Oliver Nelson	More Blues and the Abstract Truth
A-76	Lorez Alexandria	More of the Great Lorez Alexandria
A-77	John Coltrane	A Love Supreme
A-78	Lionel Hampton	You Better Know It!!!
A-79	McCoy Tyner	McCoy Tyner Plays Ellington
A-80	The Russian Jazz Quartet	Happiness
A-81	Shirley Scott	Queen of the Organ
A-82	Chico Hamilton	Chic Chic Chico
A-83	Lambert, Hendricks & Ross	Sing a Song of Basie
A-84	Yusef Lateef	1984
A-85	John Coltrane	The John Coltrane Quartet Plays
A-86	Archie Shepp	Fire Music
A-87	Coleman Hawkins	Wrapped Tight
A-88	Elvin Jones	Dear John C.
A-89	Lawrence Brown	Inspired Abandon
A-90	Various Artists	The New Wave in Jazz
A-91	Sonny Rollins	Sonny Rollins on Impulse!
A-92	Yusef Lateef	Psychicemotus
A-93	Shirley Scott	Latin Shadows
A-94	John Coltrane & Archie Shepp	New Thing at Newport
A-95	John Coltrane	Ascension 1
A-95	John Coltrane	Ascension 2
A-96	Pee Wee Russell & Marshall Brown	Ask Me Now!
A-97	Archie Shepp	On This Night
A-98	Dannie Richmond	"In" Jazz for the Culture Set
A-99	Various Artists	Definitive Jazz Scene 1
A-100	Various Artists	Definitive Jazz Scene 2
A-1972	Various Artists	Irrepressible Impulses
A-9101	Various Artists	Definitive Jazz Scene 3
A-9102	Chico Hamilton	El Chico
A-9103	John Lee Hooker	It Serve You Right to Suffer
A-9104	Gary McFarland & Clark Terry	Tijuana Jazz
A-9105	Gábor Szabó	Gypsy '66
A-9106	John Coltrane	Kulu Se Mama
A-9107	Louis Bellson	Thunderbird
A-9108	Earl Hines	Once Upon a Time
A-9109	Shirley Scott	On a Clear Day
A-9110	John Coltrane	Meditations
A-9111	Sonny Rollins	Alfie
A-9112	Gary McFarland	Profiles
A-9113	Oliver Nelson	Oliver Nelson Plays Michelle
A-9114	Chico Hamilton	The Further Adventures of El Chico
A-9115	Stanley Turrentine	Let It Go
A-9116	Benny Carter	Additions to Further Definitions
A-9117	Yusef Lateef	A Flat, G Flat and C
A-9118	Archie Shepp	Archie Shepp Live in San Francisco
A-9119	Shirley Scott	Roll 'Em: Shirley Scott Plays the Big Bands
A-9120	John Coltrane	Expression
A-9121	Sonny Rollins	East Broadway Run Down
A-9122	Gary McFarland & Gábor Szabó	Simpático
A-9123	Gábor Szabó	Spellbinder
A-9124	John Coltrane	Live at the Village Vanguard Again!
A-9125	Yusef Lateef	The Golden Flute
A-9126	Roswell Rudd	Everywhere
A-9127	Clark Terry & Chico O'Farrill	Spanish Rice
A-9128	Gábor Szabó	Jazz Raga
A-9129	Oliver Nelson	Sound Pieces
A-9130	Chico Hamilton	The Dealer
A-9131	Zoot Sims	Waiting Game
A-9132	Hank Jones & Oliver Nelson	Happenings
A-9133	Shirley Scott & Clark Terry	Soul Duo
A-9134	Archie Shepp	Mama Too Tight
A-9135	Chico O'Farrill	Nine Flags
A-9136	Gary McFarland & Steve Kuhn	The October Suite
A-9137	Pee Wee Russell & Henry "Red" Allen	The College Concert
A-9138	Pharoah Sanders	Tauhid
A-9139	Marion Brown	Three for Shepp
A-9140	John Coltrane	Om
A-9141	Shirley Scott	Girl Talk
A-9142	Mal Waldron	Sweet Love, Bitter (Soundtrack)
A-9143	Phil Woods	Greek Cooking
A-9144	Oliver Nelson	The Kennedy Dream
A-9145	Various Artists	Intercollegiate Music Festival 1
A-9146	Gábor Szabó	The Sorcerer
A-9147	Pee Wee Russell & Oliver Nelson	The Spirit of '67
A-9148	John Coltrane	Cosmic Music
A-9149	Dizzy Gillespie	Swing Low, Sweet Cadillac
A-9150	Jazzbo Collins	A Lovely Bunch of Jazzbo Collins and the Bandidos
A-9151	Gábor Szabó	Wind, Sky and Diamonds
A-9152	Mel Brown	Chicken Fat
A-9153	Oliver Nelson	Live from Los Angeles
A-9154	Archie Shepp	The Magic of Ju-Ju
A-9155	Albert Ayler	Albert Ayler in Greenwich Village
A-9156	Alice Coltrane	A Monastic Trio
A-9157	Clark Terry	It's What's Happenin'
A-9158	Rolf Kühn & Joachim Kühn	Impressions of New York
A-9159	Gábor Szabó and Bob Thiele	Light My Fire
A-9160	Elvin Jones & Richard Davis	Heavy Sounds
A-9161	John Coltrane	Selflessness: Featuring My Favorite Things
A-9162	Archie Shepp	Three for a Quarter, One for a Dime
A-9163	Tom Scott	The Honeysuckle Breeze
A-9164	Bill Plummer and the Cosmic Brotherhood	Bill Plummer and the Cosmic Brotherhood
A-9165	Albert Ayler	Love Cry
A-9166	Emil Richards	Journey to Bliss
A-9167	Gábor Szabó	More Sorcery
A-9168	Oliver Nelson & Steve Allen	Soulful Brass
A-9169	Mel Brown	The Wizard
A-9170	Archie Shepp	The Way Ahead
A-9171	Tom Scott	Rural Still Life
A-9172	Various Artists	Irrepressible Impulses
A-9173	Gábor Szabó	Best Of
A-9174	Chico Hamilton	Best Of
A-9175	Albert Ayler	New Grass
A-9176	Ahmad Jamal	At the Top - Poinciana Revisited
A-9177		
A-9178	Ornette Coleman	Ornette at 12
A-9179		
A-9180	Mel Brown	Blues for We
A-9181	Pharoah Sanders	Karma
A-9182	Emil Richards	Spirit of 1976
A-9183	Charlie Haden	Liberation Music Orchestra
A-9184	Dave MacKay & Vicky Hamilton	Dave MacKay and Vicky Hamilton
A-9185	Alice Coltrane	Huntington Ashram Monastery
A-9186	Mel Brown	I'd Rather Suck My Thumb
A-9187	Ornette Coleman	Crisis
A-9188	Archie Shepp	For Losers
A-9189	Milt Jackson	That's the Way It Is
A-9190	Pharoah Sanders	Jewels of Thought
A-9191	Albert Ayler	Music Is the Healing Force of the Universe
A-9192	Buddy Montgomery	This Rather Than That
A-9193	Jackson & Ray Brown	Memphis Jackson
A-9194	Ahmad Jamal	The Awakening
A-9195	John Coltrane	Transition
A-9196	Alice Coltrane	Ptah, the El Daoud
A-9197	Clifford Coulter	East Side San Jose
A-9198	Dave MacKay & Vicky Hamilton	Rainbow
A-9199	Pharoah Sanders	Deaf Dumb Blind (Summun Bukmun Umyun)
A-9200	John Coltrane	His Greatest Years 1
A-9201		
A-9202	John Coltrane	Live in Seattle
A-9203	Alice Coltrane	Journey in Satchidananda
A-9204	Gábor Szabó	His Great Hits
A-9205	Genesis	Trespass
A-9206	Pharoah Sanders	Thembi
A-9207	Howard Roberts	Antelope Freeway
A-9208	Albert Ayler	The Last Album
A-9209	Mel Brown	Mel Brown's Fifth
A-9210	Alice Coltrane	Universal Consciousness
A-9211	John Coltrane	Sun Ship
A-9212	Archie Shepp	Things Have Got to Change
A-9213	Chico Hamilton	His Great Hits
A-9214	John Klemmer	Constant Throb
A-9215	Michael White	Spirit Dance
A-9216	Clifford Coulter	Do It Now!
A-9217	Ahmad Jamal	Freeflight
A-9218	Alice Coltrane	World Galaxy
A-9219	Pharoah Sanders	Black Unity
A-9220	John Klemmer	Waterfalls
A-9221	Michael White	Pneuma
A-9222	Archie Shepp	Attica Blues
A-9223	John Coltrane	His Greatest Years 2
A-9224	Alice Coltrane	Lord of Lords
A-9225	Alice Coltrane	John Coltrane: Infinity
A-9226	Ahmad Jamal	Outertimeinnerspace
A-9227	Pharoah Sanders	Live at the East
A-9228	Various Artists	Impulse Energy Essentials
A-9229	Pharoah Sanders	Best Of
A-9230	Milt Jackson Quintet featuring Ray Brown	Just the Way It Had to Be
A-9231	Archie Shepp	The Cry of My People
A-9232	Alice Coltrane	Reflection on Creation and Space
A-9233	Pharoah Sanders	Wisdom Through Music
A-9234	Charles Mingus	Reevaluation: The Impulse Years
A-9235	McCoy Tyner	Reevaluation: The Impulse Years
A-9236	Sonny Rollins	Reevaluation: The Impulse Years
A-9237	Freddie Hubbard	Reevaluation: The Impulse Years
A-9238	Ahmad Jamal	Tranquility
A-9239	Sun Ra	Atlantis
A-9240	Keith Jarrett	Fort Yawuh
A-9241	Michael White	The Land of Spirit and Light
A-9242	Sun Ra	The Nubians of Plutonia
A-9243	Sun Ra	The Magic City
A-9244	John Klemmer	Intensity
A-9245	Sun Ra	Angels and Demons at Play
A-9246	John Coltrane	Live in Japan
A-9247	Gary Saracho	En Medio
A-9248	Gato Barbieri	Chapter One: Latin America
A-9249	Mel Brown	Big Foot Country Girl
A-9250	Dewey Redman	The Ear of the Behearer
A-9251	Sam Rivers	Streams
A-9252	Marion Brown	Geechee Recollections
A-9253	Various Artists	The Saxophone
A-9254	Pharoah Sanders	Village of the Pharoahs
A-9255	Sun Ra	Astro Black
A-9256	Duke Ellington	Reevaluation: The Impulse Years
A-9257	Albert Ayler	Reevaluation: The Impulse Years
A-9258	Coleman Hawkins	Reevaluation: The Impulse Years
A-9259	Yusef Lateef	Reevaluation: The Impulse Years
A-9260	Ahmad Jamal	Reevaluation: The Impulse Years
A-9261	Pharoah Sanders	Elevation
A-9262	Archie Shepp	Kwanza
A-9263	Gato Barbieri	Chapter Two: Hasta Siempre
A-9264	Various Artists	Impulse Artists on Tour
A-9265	Sun Ra	Jazz In Silhouette
A-9266	Various Artists	Impulsively
A-9267	Various Artists	No Energy Crisis
A-9268	Michael White	Father Music, Mother Dance
A-9269	John Klemmer	Magic and Movement
A-9270	Sun Ra	Fate in a Pleasant Mood
A-9271	Sun Ra	Supersonic Sounds
A-9272	Various Artists	The Drums
A-9273	John Coltrane	The Africa/Brass Sessions, Volume 2
A-9274	Keith Jarrett	Treasure Island
A-9275	Marion Brown	Sweet Earth Flying
A-9276	Sun Ra	Bad and Beautiful
A-9277	John Coltrane	Interstellar Space
A-9278	John Coltrane	His Greatest Years 3
A-9279	Gato Barbieri	Chapter Three: Viva Emiliano Zapata
A-9280	Pharoah Sanders	Love in Us All
A-9281	Michael White	Go with the Flow
A-9282	Milt Jackson	The Impulse Years
A-9283	Elvin Jones	The Impulse Years
A-9284	Various Artists	The Bass
A-9285	Various Artists	Ellingtonia 2
A-9286	Sam Rivers	Crystals
A-9287	Sun Ra	Night of the Purple Moon (not released)
A-9288	Sun Ra	Sun Ra and his Solar Arkestra Visits Planet Earth (not released)
A-9289	Sun Ra	My Brother, the Wind (not released)
A-9290	Sun Ra	Sound Sun Pleasure!! (not released)
A-9291	Sun Ra	Cosmic Tones for Mental Therapy (not released)
A-9292	Sun Ra	We Travel the Space Ways (not released)
A-9293	Sun Ra	Other Planes of There (not released)
A-9294	Sun Ra	Art Forms of Dimensions Tomorrow (not released)
A-9295	Sun Ra	Monorails and Satellites (not released)
A-9296	Sun Ra	Cymbals (not released)
A-9297	Sun Ra	Crystal Spears (not released)
A-9298	Sun Ra	Pathways to Unknown Worlds
A-9299	Howard Roberts	Equinox Express Elevator
A-9300	Dewey Redman	Coincide
A-9301	Keith Jarrett	Death and the Flower
A-9302	Sam Rivers	Hues
A-9303	Gato Barbieri	Chapter Four: Alive in New York
A-9304	Marion Brown	Vista
A-9305	Keith Jarrett	Backhand
A-9306	John Coltrane	The Gentle Side of John Coltrane
A-9307	Lucky Thompson	Dancing Sunbeam
A-9308	Brass Fever	Brass Fever
A-9309		
A-9310	Yusef Lateef	Club Date
A-9311	Gloria Lynne	I Don't Know How to Love Him
A-9312	Sonny Criss	Warm and Sonny
A-9313	Jimmy Ponder	Illusions
A-9314	John Handy	Hard Work
A-9315	Keith Jarrett	Mysteries
A-9316	Sam Rivers	Sizzle
A-9317	Bobby Blue Bland & B.B. King	Bobby Bland and B.B. King Together Again...Live
A-9318	Wade Marcus	Metamorphosis
A-9319	Brass Fever	Time Is Running Out
A-9320		
A-9321	Betty Carter	What a Little Moonlight Can Do
A-9322	Keith Jarrett	Shades
A-9323		
A-9324	John Handy	Carnival
A-9325	John Coltrane	The Other Village Vanguard Tapes 11/61
A-9326	Sonny Criss	The Joy of Sax
A-9327	Jimmy Ponder	White Room
A-9328	Blue Mitchell	African Violet
A-9329	Les McCann	Music Lets Me Be
A-9330	Grady Tate	Master Grady Tate
A-9331	Keith Jarrett	Byablue
A-9332	John Coltrane	First Meditations
A-9333	Les McCann	Live at the Roxy
A-9334	Keith Jarrett	Bop-Be
A-9335	Oliver Nelson	Three Dimensions
A-9336	Albert Ayler	The Village Concerts
A-9337	Kenny Dorham / Sonny Criss	The Bopmasters
A-9338	McCoy Tyner	The Early Trios
A-9339	Various Artists	The New Breed
A-9340	Gil Evans & Gary McFarland	The Great Arrangers
A-9341	Shirley Scott	The Great Live Sessions
A-9342	Quincy Jones	The Quintessential Charts
A-9343	Hugh Masekela	The African Connection
A-9344		
A-9345	John Coltrane	The Mastery of John Coltrane, Vol. 1: Feelin' Good
A-9346	John Coltrane	The Mastery of John Coltrane, Vol. 2: To the Beat of a Different Drum
A-9347	Blue Mitchell	Summer Soft
A-9348	Keith Jarrett	Best Of
A-9349	Sonny Rollins	There Will Never Be Another You
A-9350	Duke Ellington	The Great Tenor Encounters
A-9351	Count Basie	Retrospective Sessions
A-9352	Sam Rivers	The Trio Sessions
A-9353	Yusef Lateef	The Live Session
A-9354	Tom Scott / John Klemmer / Gato Barbieri	Foundations
A-9355		
A-9356	Paul Horn	Plenty of Horn
A-9357	Archie Shepp	Further Fire Music
A-9358		
A-9359	Pee Wee Russell	Salute to Newport
A-9360	John Coltrane	The Mastery of John Coltrane, Vol. 3: Jupiter Variation
A-9361	John Coltrane	The Mastery of John Coltrane, Vol. 4: Trane's Modes

=== 1987–present ===
- Teodross Avery
  - 1995: My Generation
- Black Note
  - 1995: Nothin' but the Swing
- Henry Butler
  - 1987: The Village (with Ron Carter, Jack DeJohnette, John Purcell, Alvin Batiste, Bob Stewart)
- Michael Brecker
  - 1987: Michael Brecker
  - 1988: Don't Try This at Home
  - 1996: Tales from the Hudson
  - 1998: Two Blocks from the Edge
- Alice Coltrane
  - 2004: Translinear Light
- Jack DeJohnette
  - 1987: Irresistible Forces
  - 1988: Audio-Visualscapes
- Donald Harrison
  - 1996: Nouveau Swing
  - 1997: Free to Be
- Henry Johnson
  - 1986: You're the One
  - 1988: Future Excursions
- Diana Krall
  - 1996: All for You: a Dedication to the Nat King Cole Trio
  - 1997: Love Scenes
  - 1998: Have Yourself a Merry Little Christmas
- Machito
  - 1988: Machito & His Salsa Big Band
- Russell Malone
  - 1998: Sweet Georgia Peach
- Andrea Motis
  - 2017: Emotional Dance
- Danilo Pérez
  - 1996: Panamonk
- Eric Reed
  - 1996: Musicale
- Horace Silver
  - 1996: The Hardbop Grandpop
  - 1997: A Prescription for the Blues
- Sons of Kemet
  - 2018: Your Queen Is a Reptile
  - 2021: Black to the Future
- Greg Tardy
  - 1997: Serendipity
- The Comet Is Coming
  - 2019: Trust in the Lifeforce of the Deep Mystery
  - 2022: Hyper-Dimensional Expansion Beam
- Shabaka Hutchings
  - 2022: Afrikan Culture
- McCoy Tyner
  - 1987: Blues for Coltrane
  - 1995: Infinity
  - 1997: What the World Needs Now
  - 2001: McCoy Tyner Plays John Coltrane
- Brandee Younger
  - 2021: Somewhere Different
  - 2023: Brand New Life
  - 2025: Gadabout Season
- José James
  - 2010: For All We Know with Jef Neve
- Snarky Puppy
  - 2015: Sylva with Metropole Orkest
- Various artists
  - 1998: Jazz Underground: Live at Smalls
