= Dear Old Stockholm (album) =

Compilation album by John Coltrane
- Released: 1993
- Recorded: April 29, 1963 and May 26, 1965
- Studio: Van Gelder Studio, Englewood Cliffs, NJ
- Genre: Jazz
- Length: 48:45
- Label: GRP, Impulse! GRD-120
- Producer: Bob Thiele, John Coltrane

Dear Old Stockholm is a compilation album by jazz musician John Coltrane released by GRP and Impulse! in 1993. The music, which was recorded on April 29, 1963 and May 26, 1965 at Van Gelder Studio in Englewood Cliffs, NJ, features Coltrane's quartet with Roy Haynes substituting for Elvin Jones on drums.

Of the 1963 tracks, "After the Rain" appeared on the original 1963 LP release of Impressions, while "Dear Old Stockholm", which Coltrane had previously recorded with Miles Davis on the 1957 album 'Round About Midnight, appeared on the 2000 CD reissue of that album. Both tracks were also featured on the 1978 compilation The Mastery of John Coltrane, Vol. 2: To the Beat of a Different Drum. All of the 1965 tracks, recorded nine days after the session which yielded most of the music on The John Coltrane Quartet Plays, appeared on The Mastery of John Coltrane, Vol. 2: To the Beat of a Different Drum, while "Dear Lord" was also featured on the original 1970 LP release of Transition. All five tracks were included in the 1998 compilation The Classic Quartet: The Complete Impulse! Recordings.

== Background ==
Coltrane and Haynes had known each other since the late 1940s, and had played together in Thelonious Monk's quartet in 1958 (documented on the album Thelonious Monk Quartet With John Coltrane: Complete Live At The Five Spot), at which time they began to establish a musical rapport. In April 1961, Haynes and bassist Scott LaFaro, who at the time were members of Stan Getz's quartet, sat in with Coltrane during a two-week gig at the Zebra Lounge in Los Angeles, and on November 2, 1961, Haynes substituted for Elvin Jones during a set at the Village Vanguard, recordings of which appear on The Complete 1961 Village Vanguard Recordings.

In early 1963, Jones was arrested in Boston on drug-related charges, and was sent to the Lexington Narcotics Hospital/Clinical Research Center in Lexington, Kentucky, where he remained from mid-April to late July of that year. During this time, Coltrane employed a number of drummers, including Louis Hayes and Philly Joe Jones, but relied heavily on Haynes, who joined Coltrane when his schedule permitted. "Dear Old Stockholm" and "After The Rain" were both recorded in Jones's absence at an April 29 session. Haynes would also join Coltrane for the July 7, 1963 concert at the Newport Jazz Festival, recordings of which may be heard on Selflessness: Featuring My Favorite Things, Newport '63 and My Favorite Things: Coltrane at Newport. Less than two years later, on May 26, 1965, Haynes again substituted for Jones, recording "One Down, One Up", "After The Crescent", and "Dear Lord", along with a version of "Welcome" which remains unreleased.

Haynes's drumming provided an interesting contrast with that of Jones. Haynes's sound was lighter and, in general, higher-pitched; Coltrane told Haynes that, with him, he could hear Tyner better than when he played with Jones. Haynes also tended to "drop bombs" in the style of bebop drummers, and was very consistent about delineating the meter, unlike Jones, who often obscured it. (Haynes commented: "[Coltrane] could always know where he was" when the two played together.) Coltrane biographer Eric Nisenson called Haynes "a fiery and free player, yet always supportive of the soloist" and "a 'listening drummer', one who is sensitive to the playing of the musician he is accompanying", and wrote: "He is quite simply a master, and Coltrane was lucky to get him for most of the period Elvin was locked up."

Coltrane called Haynes "one of the best drummers I've ever worked with," and stated: "I always tried to get him when Elvin Jones wasn't able to make it. There's a difference between them. Elvin's feeling was a driving force. Roy's was more of a spreading, a permeating. Well, they both have a way of spreading the rhythm, but they're different. They're both very accomplished. You can feel what they're doing and can get with it." Haynes remarked: "For a drummer, to play with Coltrane is just to accompany the guy... With others, you gotta hold down the fort. With Coltrane, I could do things I had dreamed about." He also commented: "When I worked with Trane - I'll tell you this, the intensity was so high... it stayed high. So I stayed with the intensity. I didn't necessarily play differently than I normally play, but John's solos were longer, and I didn't want to play the same thing throughout his solo, so I'd have to think of more things and get ideas from what he was playing. When I'm with Trane, I don't want to let him down - I want to keep him inspired." Haynes later praised the balance of musical responsibility within Coltrane's group, stating: "Everyone was doing their thing. No one was dependent on one person... the way it could happen with some groups [where] a lot of people are depending on the drummer. There... it was equally distributed."

== Reception ==
Professional ratings
Review scores
Source	Rating
AllMusic	4/5 stars
The Rolling Stone Jazz & Blues Album Guide	3.5/5 stars
The Penguin Guide to Jazz	3.5/4 stars

In a review for AllMusic, Scott Yanow wrote: "This LP contains five excellent performances by the John Coltrane Quartet from two occasions when drummer Roy Haynes filled in for Elvin Jones... Although Haynes had a different approach on the drums than Jones, he fit in perfectly with the group, stimulating Coltrane to play brilliantly throughout these two sessions."

The authors of the Penguin Guide to Jazz Recordings awarded the album 3½ stars, and commented: "Roy Haynes is the unacknowledged hero of the Coltrane discography. Something interesting happens whenever he appears on the scene... the music seems more alert, physically more buoyant."

Regarding the track "Dear Old Stockholm", Coltrane biographer Ben Ratliff wrote: "There was more space and fragility in Haynes's sound than in Jones's... During Coltrane's long solo, when McCoy Tyner sits out, close listeners will hear Jimmy Garrison's bass playing, leaving different beats open and unstressed in each bar, better than on almost any recording made by Coltrane's quartet. Some musicians have suggested that Garrison plays so strongly here as to nearly overpower Haynes."

Lewis Porter, in his biography of Coltrane, wrote the following concerning "Dear Lord": "The theme that Coltrane plays on tenor begins with three notes going up a scale, each held for four measures with slight embellishments, floating over the support of the rhythm section. The very simplicity of it is daring. Somehow those three notes epitomize what so many people love about John Coltrane's music - the strength, the concentration, the purity, the aching directness of it. There will never be three notes quite like them."

== Track listing ==
All compositions by John Coltrane except where noted. All tracks recorded at Van Gelder Studios.

No.	Title	Recording date	Length
1.	"Dear Old Stockholm" (Traditional)	April 29, 1963	10:33
2.	"After The Rain"	April 29, 1963	4:07
3.	"One Down, One Up"	May 26, 1965	15:12
4.	"After The Crescent"	May 26, 1965	13:24
5.	"Dear Lord"	May 26, 1965	5:29

== Personnel ==
- John Coltrane – tenor saxophone
- McCoy Tyner – piano
- Jimmy Garrison – double bass
- Roy Haynes – drums
