= The Classic Quartet – Complete Impulse! Studio Recordings =

Box set by John Coltrane
- Released: 1998
- Recorded: 1962–1965
- Genre: Jazz
- Length: 521:31
- Label: Impulse!
- Producer: Bob Thiele

The Classic Quartet – Complete Impulse! Studio Recordings is a 1998 box set by jazz musician John Coltrane with recordings from his classic quartet, including pianist McCoy Tyner, bassist Jimmy Garrison, and drummer Elvin Jones.

== Background ==
=== Albums covered ===
Coltrane's classic quartet recorded 11 albums for Impulse!:

- Ballads (1962)
- Coltrane (1962)
- Live at Birdland (1963)
- Crescent (1964)
- A Love Supreme (1964)
- The John Coltrane Quartet Plays (1965)
- Living Space (1965)
- Transition (1965)
- Sun Ship (1965)
- First Meditations (1965)
- Kulu Sé Mama (1965) (Side 2 is by the Quartet; side 1 by a larger group)

=== Albums missed ===
Some of the Impulse! albums not included (as they did not cover material by the Classic Quartet but by different lineups)

- Africa/Brass (1961)
- Duke Ellington & John Coltrane (1962)
- John Coltrane and Johnny Hartman (1963)
- Ascension (1965)
- Meditations (1965)
- Interstellar Space (1967)
- Expression (1967)

== Reception ==
Professional ratings
Review scores
Source	Rating
Allmusic	5/5 stars
Encyclopedia of Popular Music	5/5 stars
The Penguin Guide to Jazz	4/4 stars

In a review for AllMusic, Thom Jurek wrote: "What transpired over the course of the eight albums and supplementary material used elsewhere is nothing short of a complete transfiguration of one band into another one, from a band that followed the leader into places unknown to one that inspired him and pushed him further. All of this transpired in the span of only three years... There can be no arguing the value of the originally released recordings; whether they were issued during Coltrane's lifetime or after his death, they tell a story that millions of listeners formed their impressions by, true or false, and created a legacy that lives on. But there is also something to be said for setting the record straight, and the chronological approach that this set takes in no way desecrates the integrity of the original albums themselves... Simply put, it is indispensable to those who need a deeper understanding of Coltrane's music and the development of his most influential period. The sound quality is fully remastered to 20-bit technology, and the package is unwieldy but beautiful and sturdy. It's a must."

The authors of The Penguin Guide to Jazz stated: "this is a magnificently packaged and organized document, and it stands as a memorial to one of the truly great groups in the history of jazz."

Writing for All About Jazz, Robert Spencer commented: "the chronological arrangement of this disc allows the listener to hear Coltrane progress ever farther in his quest for new musical expressions and deeper honesty in his communication... By the time one reaches the recordings that made up First Meditations and spelled the turbulent end of the classic quartet, many worlds have been spanned... And much beautiful and inspiring music has been made... these eight discs are remarkable for the breadth of Coltrane's musical vision... There were so many sides to John Coltrane's music that these kind of brilliant contradictions can be found all through this set, and we are all the richer for it. The Complete Impulse! Studio Recordings is a lovingly collected monument to some of the greatest music anyone has ever made."

Ben Ratliff, in an article for The New York Times, wrote: "What more can be said about the records every 50-and-under jazz fan knows?... After one spin, half of this music will be permanently remembered by the budding jazz fan; the other half will take the rest of a lifetime to be understood."

== Track listing ==
Disc 1
No.	Title	Original release	Length
1.	"Greensleeves"	Greensleeves 7" single	3:41
2.	"It's Easy to Remember"	Ballads	2:45
3.	"The Inch Worm"	Coltrane	6:15
4.	"Big Nick"	Coltrane (CD bonus track)	4:05
5.	"Out of This World"	Coltrane	14:02
6.	"Soul Eyes"	Coltrane	5:23
7.	"Miles' Mode"	Coltrane	7:31
8.	"Tunji"	Coltrane	6:32
9.	"Nancy (with the Laughing Face)"	Ballads	3:10
10.	"What's New?"	Ballads	3:44
11.	"Up ‘gainst the Wall"	Impressions	3:13
12.	"Too Young to Go Steady"	Ballads	4:20
13.	"All or Nothing at All"	Ballads	3:35
14.	"I Wish I Knew"	Ballads	4:51

Disc 2
No.	Title	Original release	Length
1.	"You Don't Know What Love Is"	Ballads	5:12
2.	"Say It (Over and Over Again)"	Ballads	4:15
3.	"Vilia"	The Definitive Jazz Scene Volume 3	4:36
4.	"After the Rain"	Impressions	4:09
5.	"Dear Old Stockholm"	The Mastery of John Coltrane, Vol. 2: To the Beat of a Different Drum	10:40
6.	"Your Lady"	Live at Birdland	6:39
7.	"Alabama (Take 4&5)"	Live at Birdland	5:08
8.	"Lonnie's Lament"	Crescent	11:45
9.	"The Drum Thing"	Crescent	7:22
10.	"Wise One"	Crescent	9:01

Disc 3
No.	Title	Original release	Length
1.	"Crescent"	Crescent	8:42
2.	"Bessie's Blues"	Crescent	3:32
3.	"A Love Supreme, Part I: Acknowledgement"	A Love Supreme	7:47
4.	"A Love Supreme, Part II: Resolution"	A Love Supreme	7:22
5.	"A Love Supreme, Part III: Pursuance"	A Love Supreme	10:45
6.	"A Love Supreme, Part IV: Psalm"	A Love Supreme	7:05
7.	"Nature Boy (First Version)"	The Mastery of John Coltrane, Vol. 1: Feelin' Good	7:03
8.	"Nature Boy"	The John Coltrane Quartet Plays	8:01
9.	"Feelin' Good"	The Mastery of John Coltrane, Vol. 1: Feelin' Good	6:22
10.	"Chim Chim Cheree"	The John Coltrane Quartet Plays	6:56

Disc 4
No.	Title	Original release	Length
1.	"Brasilia"	The John Coltrane Quartet Plays	12:54
2.	"Song of Praise"	The John Coltrane Quartet Plays	9:51
3.	"After the Crescent"	The Mastery of John Coltrane, Vol. 2: To the Beat of a Different Drum	13:40
4.	"Dear Lord"	Transition	5:34
5.	"One Down, One Up"	The Mastery of John Coltrane, Vol. 2: To the Beat of a Different Drum	15:28
6.	"Welcome"	Kulu Sé Mama	5:25
7.	"The Last Blues"	Living Space	4:22

Disc 5
No.	Title	Original release	Length
1.	"Untitled Original 90314"	The Mastery of John Coltrane, Vol. 1: Feelin' Good	14:45
2.	"Transition"	Transition	15:27
3.	"Suite"	Transition	21:17
4.	"Living Space"	The Mastery of John Coltrane, Vol. 1: Feelin' Good	10:21
5.	"Dusk Dawn"	Kulu Sé Mama (CD bonus track)	10:48

Disc 6
No.	Title	Original release	Length
1.	"Vigil"	Kulu Sé Mama	9:50
2.	"Untitled Original 90320"	The Mastery of John Coltrane, Vol. 1: Feelin' Good	10:44
3.	"Dearly Beloved"	Sun Ship	6:27
4.	"Attaining"	Sun Ship	11:24
5.	"Sun Ship"	Sun Ship	6:12
6.	"Ascent"	Sun Ship	10:05
7.	"Amen"	Sun Ship	8:14

Disc 7
No.	Title	Original release	Length
1.	"Love"	First Meditations	8:04
2.	"Compassion"	First Meditations	9:34
3.	"Joy"	First Meditations	8:48
4.	"Consequences"	First Meditations	7:20
5.	"Serenity"	First Meditations	6:11
6.	"Joy (Second Version)"	The Mastery of John Coltrane, Vol. 1: Feelin' Good	12:21

Disc 8 (all tracks previously unreleased)
No.	Title	Length
1.	"Crescent (First Version)"	10:04
2.	"Bessie's Blues (First Version - Incomplete)"	2:58
3.	"Song of Praise (First Version)"	2:41
4.	"A Love Supreme, Part II: Resolution (Alternate Take)"	7:21
5.	"Feeling Good (Alternate Take)"	6:16
6.	"Dear Lord (Breakdowns and Alternate Take)"	7:41
7.	"Living Space (Breakdown and Alternate Take)"	14:02

== Personnel ==
Recorded between 1961 and 1965 in New York City.

The Classic Quartet:

- John Coltrane — tenor saxophone/soprano saxophone
- McCoy Tyner — piano (all tracks except "Up 'gainst the Wall")
- Jimmy Garrison — bass (all tracks except "Greensleeves" and "It's Easy To Remember")
- Elvin Jones — drums (all tracks except The Mastery of John Coltrane, Vol. 2: To the Beat of a Different Drum recordings)

Additional Performers:

- Art Davis — bass (only appears on disc 3: tracks 7, 8, 9)
- Roy Haynes — drums (only appears on disc 2: tracks 4, 5 and disc 4: tracks 3, 4, 5)
- Reggie Workman — bass (only appears on disc 1: tracks 1, 2)
