= Selflessness =

Selflessness may refer to:

- Anatta in Buddhism
- Altruism
- Ego loss
- Selflessness: Featuring My Favorite Things, a 1969 jazz album
