= The Mastery of John Coltrane / Vol. I: Feelin' Good =

Compilation album by John Coltrane
- Released: 1978
- Recorded: February 17, 1965 (#7); February 18, 1965 (#1); June 10, 1965 (#5); June 16, 1965 (#3-4, 6); Van Gelder Studio, Englewood Cliffs; July 2, 1965 (#2); Newport Jazz Festival, Newport; September 22, 1965 (#8); Coast Recorders, San Francisco
- Genre: Jazz
- Length: 87:10
- Label: Impulse! IZ 9345-2
- Producer: Bob Thiele

John Coltrane chronology
On a Misty Night (1978)	The Mastery of John Coltrane / Vol. I: Feelin' Good (1978)	The Mastery of John Coltrane / Vol. II: To the Beat of a Different Drum (1978)

Professional ratings
Review scores
Source	Rating
AllMusic	3/5 stars
The Rolling Stone Jazz Record Guide	3/5 stars

The Mastery of John Coltrane / Vol. I: Feelin' Good, also known as Feelin' Good, is a double compilation album by American saxophonist John Coltrane, the first of a series of four compilations released on Impulse! between 1978 and 1979, all sharing the same cover artwork designed by Stuart Kusher, Richard Germinaro and Vigon Nahas Vigon. It features pieces recorded in 1965, seven in studio and one live.

== Release history ==
All the tracks were previously unissued in these mixes – "Joy" and "Living Space" having previously appeared with orchestral overdubs arranged by Alice Coltrane on the 1972 album Infinity – at the time of release. At present, the availability of said tracks is as follows:

- "Feelin' Good" and "Nature Boy" – The John Coltrane Quartet Plays CD reissue
- "Dusk Dawn" – Kulu Sé Mama CD reissue and Living Space
- "Living Space", "Untitled 90320" and "Untitled 90314" – Living Space
- "Joy" – First Meditations CD reissue
- "My Favorite Things" – CD reissue of New Thing at Newport and My Favorite Things: Coltrane at Newport

== Track listing ==
Side 1
No.	Title	Recording date and location	Length
1.	"Feelin' Good"	February 18, 1965 at Van Gelder Studios	6:24
2.	"My Favorite Things"	July 2, 1965 at Newport Jazz Festival	14:43

Side 2
No.	Title	Recording date and location	Length
1.	"Living Space"	June 16, 1965 at Van Gelder Studios	10:20
2.	"Untitled 90320"	June 10, 1965 at Van Gelder Studios	10:39

Side 3
No.	Title	Recording date and location	Length
1.	"Untitled 90314"	June 10, 1965 at Van Gelder Studios	14:43
2.	"Dusk Dawn"	June 16, 1965 at Van Gelder Studios	10:44

Side 4
No.	Title	Recording date and location	Length
1.	"Nature Boy" (First Version)	February 17, 1965 at Van Gelder Studios	6:58
2.	"Joy" (Alternate Version)	September 2, 1965 at Coast Recorders	12:14

== Personnel ==
- John Coltrane – tenor and soprano saxophone
- McCoy Tyner – piano
- Art Davis (1 and 7 only), Jimmy Garrison – bass
- Elvin Jones – drums
