= Live at the Half Note: One Down, One Up =

Live album by John Coltrane
- Released: October 11, 2005
- Recorded: March 26 and May 7, 1965
- Genres: Avant-garde jazz; free jazz
- Length: 86:31
- Labels: Impulse! Catalog No. 0602498621431; OCLC 62192165

Professional ratings
Review scores
| Source | Rating |
|---|---|
| Allmusic | 4/5 stars |
| The Penguin Guide to Jazz Recordings | 3/4 stars |

Live at the Half Note: One Down, One Up is a 2005 double CD compilation of two previously unreleased 1965 Friday radio broadcasts – March 26 and May 7 – at the Half Note Club in New York City, featuring John Coltrane with McCoy Tyner, Jimmy Garrison, and Elvin Jones.

== History ==
The recordings were made by the radio station WABC-FM, in 1965, for a Friday radio show called "Portraits in Jazz" with Alan Grant (né Abraham Grochowsky; 1919–2012). Coltrane's group played at the Half Note from March 19–April 4 and again from May 4–9 of that year. The Half Note recordings were made shortly after the February 17–18 studio recordings, and shortly before the May 17 studio recordings, that would appear on The John Coltrane Quartet Plays.

According to critic John Fordham, the recording uses "tapes discovered in the 1990s by 'Trane's sax-playing son Ravi, but which had already been circulated and studied by many awestruck saxophonists, including Mike Brecker, Steve Grossman and Dave Liebman. Liebman and Archie Shepp have vividly recalled the experience of hearing Coltrane's legendary group in full cry in the Half Note's tiny space, Shepp remarking that 'it was like being in church' and Liebman remembering an occasion when the audience 'started to put their hands up to the ceiling and the whole place stood up'." The 2005 release was produced by Ravi Coltrane, who also, with Ashley Kahn, wrote the liner notes.

== Critical reception ==
In his review for The Village Voice, music critic Robert Christgau gave the album an "A−" and said that, although it is overpriced and underrecorded to some degree, its selling point is the title track, which features the longest Coltrane solo ever recorded. He added: "It gets really good after bass and piano sit out so Coltrane and his friend Jones can bash and blow at each other undistracted." AllMusic's Thom Jurek gave it four stars and wrote: "Trane had already released A Love Supreme and was seeking to expand the harmonic reaches of his sound, exploring every avenue available to him. The band astonishes too..." Regarding the title track, he wrote: "McCoy Tyner, Garrison, and Elvin Jones push the limit, swinging hard and fast (Jones' playing is especially outrageous)..." and stated that Coltrane's "capability to continue to build a solo is simply astonishing." Jurek concludes by noting "the absolute necessity of this set for Coltrane fans. The sound is wonderful -- except in the dropout patches that last no more than a second or two. This is a release of historic importance and one that... will be talked about by jazz fans and Coltrane aficionados for the foreseeable future."

Writing in Jazz Times, Chris Kelsey stated that the album "captures Coltrane's music on the cusp of major change, just weeks before embarking on the last phase of his career — during which he expunged from his music every last speck of convention," and that it "documents the classic quartet near the end of its incredible run... The music reveals the band at its creative peak, reaching heights of focused intensity on every tune, stretching rhythmic and harmonic conventions to the breaking point. The years-long musical confrontation/collaboration between Trane and Jones is at an apex, Tyner plays with ever greater rhythmic and harmonic invention and bassist Jimmy Garrison does things with time that foreshadow his work with Coltrane's later groups." John Kelman wrote: "Both sets are stunning in their energy and collective invention... at this point, while he was continuing to evolve his dense sheets of sound improvisational approach, expanding harmonic boundaries with fiery aplomb, his group was still swinging hard." Kelman concludes: "One Down, One Up is as significant a release as the... 1957 performance by Coltrane with Thelonious Monk on At Carnegie Hall — the perfect bookend, in fact. Coltrane's musical quest was recognizable almost from the beginning, and here — only two years before his premature passing — he was arguably at his creative apex, placing unencumbered exploration within an accessible post bop context."

In his review, John Fordham wrote: "Coltrane's 30-minute solo on the title track, against Elvin Jones' surging drums, is a tour de force. The set is worth it for that alone, but you also get fresh accounts of 'Trane standbys like "Afro Blue" and "My Favourite Things". Not as jaw-dropping as what it must have been like to be there, but close." David Pope, Professor of Saxophone at James Madison University, called the recording "one of the most profound documents of myelin in action... We can hear [Coltrane] building circuits, correcting mistakes, repeating complex ideas - all in real time." Regarding the climactic section of the title track, Pope wrote: "It should be obvious to anyone with a reasonably developed ear that he is working through some extremely complex melodic material here, stopping and starting, increasing the speed, and eventually shifting into a gear that most of us will never know. I believe that we are actually hearing him put the finishing touches on a few pieces of neural circuitry... The level of physical intensity here is amazing, but what is happening inside his mind is the improvisation olympics."

Ben Ratliff referred to the title track's sax / drums duet as "the most extraordinary connection between Coltrane and Jones that exists anywhere on record," and wrote: "The music Coltrane's quartet played at New York's Half Note in the spring of 1965... shows better than the studio albums just where the band had gotten to. A recording of 'One Down, One Up,' during which Elvin Jones breaks his bass pedal and plays without a bass drum for several minutes, remains one of the best indicators of the group's energy. From the midway point to the final iteration of the theme, thirteen minutes of its twenty-seven-minute duration are a duet between Coltrane and Jones, and so it belongs in that select group of Coltrane-Jones performances alone, alongside 'Vigil' (from Transition) and a portion of 'Crescent.' And in it Coltrane swings, wired to the slightest accents of his drummer, delivering massive projection... 'One Down, One Up' is extraordinarily tough and coordinated music. There is not much obscure or implied about it; both the technical accomplishment and the physical endurance are of a sort that I have never experienced firsthand from any jazz group."

== Track listing ==
Disc 1 (March 26, 1965)
| No. | Title | Length |
|---|---|---|
| 1. | "Introduction and Announcements" (Alan Grant) | 1:36 |
| 2. | "One Down, One Up" (John Coltrane) | 27:39 |
| 3. | "Announcement" (Alan Grant) | 0:51 |
| 4. | "Afro Blue" (Mongo Santamaria) | 12:44 |

Disc 2 (May 7, 1965)
| No. | Title | Length |
|---|---|---|
| 1. | "Introduction and Announcements" (Alan Grant) | 0:43 |
| 2. | "Song of Praise" (Coltrane) | 19:38 |
| 3. | "Announcements" (Alan Grant) | 0:43 |
| 4. | "My Favorite Things" (Rodgers & Hammerstein) | 22:37 |

== Personnel ==
- John Coltrane – tenor saxophone/soprano saxophone
- Jimmy Garrison – double bass
- Elvin Jones – drums
- McCoy Tyner – piano
