= Newport '63 =

Live album by John Coltrane
- Released: July 20, 1993
- Recorded: November 2, 1961 (#4); Village Vanguard, New York City; July 7, 1963 (#1–3); Newport Jazz Festival, Newport
- Genre: Jazz
- Length: 56:48
- Labels: Impulse! GRD-128
- Producer: Bob Thiele

Newport '63 is a live album by jazz musician John Coltrane recorded at the 1963 Newport Jazz Festival, with one additional track recorded at the Village Vanguard in 1961. The album features the Coltrane quartet with drummer Roy Haynes substituting for Elvin Jones. Two of the four tracks ("My Favorite Things" and "I Want to Talk about You") had originally been released on Selflessness: Featuring My Favorite Things; in turn, these two tracks alongside a third track from the same performance ("Impressions") were released on The Mastery of John Coltrane Vol. II: To the Beat of a Different Drum.

== Reception ==
Professional ratings
Review scores
| Source | Rating |
|---|---|
| AllMusic | 4.5/5 stars |
| The New Rolling Stone Album Guide | 4/5 stars |
| The Penguin Guide to Jazz | 3.5/4 stars |
| Tom Hull – on the Web | A− |

The editors of AllMusic awarded the album 4.5 stars, and reviewer Scott Yanow stated that "Coltrane performs what is arguably his greatest version of 'My Favorite Things' along with memorable renditions of 'Impressions' and 'I Want to Talk About You'".

The authors of The Penguin Guide to Jazz Recordings noted that, in comparison with Jones, Haynes "has a lighter, springier sound," and, as a result, "Coltrane seems to shadow-box with the drummer, placing his notes differently."

Regarding the performance of "My Favorite Things," critic Gary Giddins praised Haynes' "aggressive, rousing patterns," and commented: "Where Elvin Jones creates a landscape of cymbals vibrations, Haynes sticks closer to the skins; where Jones superimposes three over two, Haynes thinks two even when he's playing three, and he varies the triple-meter rhythm with unflagging energy."

Author Burt Korall stated that the album "provides a great lesson in mutual creation," in which Coltrane and Haynes "push each other to the edge; one boldly acts on the other. The performances... achieve almost hysterical heat."

== Track listing ==
All compositions by John Coltrane except as indicated

1. "I Want to Talk About You" (Eckstine) – 8:16
2. "My Favorite Things" (Hammerstein, Rodgers) – 17:26
3. "Impressions" – 15:40 (Edited. There is a 23:30 version released on the album My Favorite Things: Coltrane at Newport)
4. "Chasin' Another Trane" – 15:26

== Personnel ==
- John Coltrane – tenor saxophone (1–4), soprano saxophone (2)
- Eric Dolphy – alto saxophone (4 only)
- McCoy Tyner – piano (1–3)
- Jimmy Garrison – double bass (1–3)
- Reggie Workman – double bass (4 only)
- Roy Haynes – drums
