= Living Space (album) =

Compilation album by John Coltrane
- Released: March 10, 1998
- Recorded: June 10 & 16, 1965
- Studio: Van Gelder Studio, Englewood Cliffs, NJ
- Genre: Jazz
- Length: 51:13
- Label: Impulse! IMPD-246
- Producer: Bob Thiele

Professional ratings
Review scores
Source	Rating
The Penguin Guide to Jazz	3/4 stars
Pitchfork Media	(9.0/10)

Living Space is a compilation album by jazz musician John Coltrane. Released posthumously by Impulse! Records on March 10, 1998, it features pieces recorded in 1965. Almost all of them had been previously issued on the Kulu Sé Mama ("Dusk Dawn") CD reissue and on The Mastery of John Coltrane, Vol. 1: Feelin' Good ("Living Space", "Untitled 90320" and "Untitled 90314"). The only previously unissued track is "Last Blues".

== Reception ==
An AllMusic review states: "The album has the spacious intensity of Trane's latter-day compositions that jar, probe, and bend the horizontal and vertical dimensions of his earlier music while finding stability in the seasoned vigor of the band. 'Living Space' appears without strings here, its melody overdubbed by Trane, in unison, on both tenor and soprano. It has the searching, mysterious quality of a mantra unlocking unseen doors, and recalls the waxing fire of A Love Supreme's 'Resolution.' 'Untitled 90320' offers perhaps the most free environment of the five cuts, with McCoy hanging chordal fragments in thin air as Elvin sympathizes energetically with Trane's excursions into unexplored harmonic vistas. Think four dimensions or more."

Pitchfork's Ryan Schreiber wrote: "What's amazing about these tracks is that they hadn't been compiled earlier because, as a record, Living Space ranks among Coltrane's best... From the vaults comes a gem so shiny that it'll blind you if you look directly into it. Living Space is more than just a pile of dusty old tapes. It's an album to which one can only lay back, close the eyes, and drift off into a land of sound where memories collapse and the heart attacks."

== Track listing ==
No.	Title	Recording date	Length
1.	"Living Space"	June 16, 1965	10:21
2.	"Untitled Original 90314"	June 10, 1965	14:48
3.	"Dusk Dawn"	June 16, 1965	10:52
4.	"Untitled Original 90320"	June 16, 1965	10:47
5.	"Last Blues"	June 10, 1965	4:25

== Personnel ==
- John Coltrane – tenor saxophone, soprano saxophone
- McCoy Tyner – piano
- Jimmy Garrison – double bass
- Elvin Jones – drums
