= My Favorite Things: Coltrane at Newport =

Live album by John Coltrane
- Released: 2007
- Recorded: July 7, 1963, and July 2, 1965
- Venue: Newport Jazz Festival, Freebody Park, Newport, Rhode Island
- Length: 1:19:35
- Label: Impulse!
- Producer: Bob Thiele

My Favorite Things: Coltrane at Newport is a live album by jazz musician John Coltrane released by Impulse! in 2007. It brings together tracks from performances by Coltrane's quartet at the Newport Jazz Festival in Newport, Rhode Island on July 7, 1963, and July 2, 1965.

== Recording and release history ==
The 1963 tracks feature Roy Haynes on drums, substituting for Elvin Jones, who was a patient at the Lexington Narcotics Hospital/Clinical Research Center in Lexington, Kentucky from mid-April to late July of that year. Two of the 1963 tracks ("My Favorite Things" and "I Want to Talk About You") were released in 1969 on Selflessness: Featuring My Favorite Things, and all three 1963 tracks were released in 1978 on The Mastery of John Coltrane, Vol. 2: To the Beat of a Different Drum and in 1993 on Newport '63. The version of "Impressions" on My Favorite Things: Coltrane at Newport is about eight minutes longer than the previously released version; the edit of the earlier version was missing the opening theme, piano solo, and bass solo, whereas the longer version is only missing the bass solo.

The 1965 tracks feature Jones on drums. "One Down, One Up" was released in 1965 on New Thing at Newport, while both 1965 tracks were included on the 2000 CD reissue of that album. The 1965 version of "My Favorite Things" was also included in the 1978 release The Mastery of John Coltrane, Vol. 1: Feelin' Good.

== Critical reception ==
Professional ratings
Review scores
| Source | Rating |
|---|---|
| AllMusic | 4/5 stars |
| All About Jazz | 4/5 stars |
| The Penguin Guide to Jazz Recordings | 3.5/4 stars |

In a review for AllMusic, Steve Leggett wrote: "Since Coltrane did lengthy versions of his signature arrangement of 'My Favorite Things' in both 1963 and 1965..., it's impossible not to compare the approach of the two different drummers. Haynes has a lighter, skittering touch that gives the piece a kind of airiness while Jones is all power and propulsion which makes for a more ambiguous and ominous feel. Both versions are striking, but the real treat here is the 23 minute and change take on 'Impressions' from 1963... Here Coltrane and Haynes trade phrases and percussive glides after Tyner and Garrison lay out what is a truly wonderful dialogue between two veteran jazz musicians. There's little doubt that the quartet hits with more raw power with Jones driving it, but here Haynes' contribution is perfect for the moment. Taken together, the 1963 and 1965 sets make a nice whole, and having two great drummers with slightly different approaches only underscores how complete Coltrane's vision was at this point in his career."

Writing for All About Jazz, Chris May commented: "Putting these two Newport appearances together on one disc serves... as a graphic illustration of Coltrane's journey towards the sonic extremes of his final few years... until his death in 1967. Even allowing for the presence of two massively different drummers—the turbulent Jones and the more measured Haynes—the shift in Coltrane's aesthetic is profound. The two versions of the soprano showcase 'My Favorite Things' bookmark the process, from the more or less conventional lyricism of the first, to the freer, more abrasive tonalities entering the second. We know the story already, of course, but hearing these two tracks practically back-to-back certainly emphasizes it."

== Track listing ==
Newport '63

1. "I Want To Talk About You" (Billy Eckstine) – 9:41
2. "My Favorite Things" (Richard Rodgers, Oscar Hammerstein II) – 17:20
3. "Impressions" (John Coltrane) – 23:30

Recorded Sunday, July 7, 1963.

Newport '65

1. "Introduction By Father Norman O'Connor" – 1:08
2. "One Down, One Up" (John Coltrane) – 12:42
3. "My Favorite Things" (Richard Rodgers, Oscar Hammerstein II) – 15:14

Recorded Friday, July 2, 1965.

== Personnel ==
- John Coltrane – tenor saxophone, soprano saxophone
- McCoy Tyner – piano
- Jimmy Garrison – double bass
- Roy Haynes – drums (1963 recordings)
- Elvin Jones – drums (1965 recordings)
