= The Major Works of John Coltrane =

Compilation album by John Coltrane
- Released: 1992
- Recorded: June 28, October 1 & 14, 1965
- Studio: Van Gelder Studio, Englewood Cliffs, New Jersey
- Genre: Free jazz, avant-garde jazz
- Length: 142:03
- Label: GRP Records
- Producer: Bob Thiele

The Major Works of John Coltrane is a compilation album by jazz musician John Coltrane, released in 1992 by GRP Records. It features extended compositions, all recorded in 1965 with expanded ensembles, and originally released by Impulse! Records on Ascension, Om, Kulu Sé Mama, and Selflessness: Featuring My Favorite Things. Both editions of Ascension are included.

== Reception ==
Professional ratings
Review scores
Source	Rating
AllMusic	5/5 stars
The Penguin Guide to Jazz	👑

In a review for AllMusic, Steve Huey wrote: "The Major Works of John Coltrane compiles the saxophonist's most important extended free jazz pieces from 1965. This is the material that made Coltrane a giant of the avant-garde, completely casting off the limits of melody, harmony, and tonality that he'd been straining against... There's a lot to digest here, but as an encapsulation of Coltrane's freest and most challenging music, there's no better place to turn."

Writing for All About Jazz, Tim Niland commented: "This collection could more appropriately be called The Spiritual Works of John Coltrane, as Coltrane's spiritual quest informs all of the music found here. This is the sound of John Coltrane leaving Earth bound chordal jazz behind and lifting off to explore the cosmos of free jazz."

The authors of The Penguin Guide to Jazz Recordings awarded the album a full 4 stars and a "crown."

== Track listing ==
Disc 1:

1. "Ascension - Edition I" — 38:37
2. "Om" — 28:49

Disc 2:

1. "Ascension - Edition II" — 40:31
2. "Kulu Se Mama" — 18:57
3. "Selflessness" — 15:09

== Personnel ==
Recorded June 28 and October 1965.

- John Coltrane — tenor saxophone
- Pharoah Sanders — tenor saxophone
- Archie Shepp — tenor saxophone (disc 1: track 1, disc 2: track 1)
- Marion Brown — alto saxophone (disc 1: track 1, disc 2: track 1)
- John Tchicai — alto saxophone (disc 1: track 1, disc 2: track 1)
- Freddie Hubbard — trumpet (disc 1: track 1, disc 2: track 1)
- Dewey Johnson — trumpet (disc 1: track 1, disc 2: track 1)
- Joe Brazil — flute (disc 1: track 2)
- Donald Garrett — clarinet (Note: The credits on the album jacket state that Garrett played bass clarinet on the recording. However, the authors of The John Coltrane Reference, who occasionally present updates to the book on their website (http://wildmusic-jazz.com/jcr_index.htm), provided an update dated 2008 which states that Dutch musician Cornelis Hazevoet sent the following information via an email to author Yasuhiro Fujioka: "Over the years, in liners, books and lists, Don Garrett has been attributed with playing bass clarinet. This is wrong. The man only played bass and clarinet (the small and straight horn, that is)... In 1975, Garrett played in my band and I've specifically asked him about it (because I already felt something was wrong with it). He most specifically and pertinently told me that he never played bass clarinet in his entire life, only the small, straight horn (which he played in my band too)... Perhaps, the error originated from the fact that Garrett was listed somewhere as playing 'bass, clarinet', which subsequently evolved into 'bass clarinet'. Whatever is the case, Garrett did not play bass clarinet on any Coltrane record nor anywhere else.")/bass (disc 1: track 2, disc 2: tracks 2,3)
- McCoy Tyner — piano
- Jimmy Garrison — bass
- Art Davis — bass (disc 1: track 1, disc 2: track 1)
- Elvin Jones — drums
- Frank Butler — drums (disc 2: tracks 2,3)
- Juno Lewis — percussion/vocals (disc 2: tracks 2,3)
