= Selflessness: Featuring My Favorite Things =

Selflessness Featuring My Favorite Things

Studio album / Live album by John Coltrane
- Released: 1969
- Recorded: July 7, 1963 (tracks 1 and 2); October 14, 1965
- Venue: Newport Jazz Festival (tracks 1 and 2)
- Studios: Western Recorders, Los Angeles (track 3)
- Genres: Jazz, post-bop, free jazz
- Length: 40:57
- Label: Impulse! AS-9161
- Producer: Bob Thiele

John Coltrane chronology
Cosmic Music (1968)	Selflessness Featuring My Favorite Things (1969)	Transition (1970)

Professional ratings
Review scores
Source	Rating
Allmusic	4/5 stars
DownBeat	3.5/5 stars
The Rolling Stone Jazz Record Guide	3/5 stars

Selflessness Featuring My Favorite Things is a posthumous album by jazz musician John Coltrane, released in 1969. The album juxtaposes two tracks ("My Favorite Things" and "I Want to Talk About You") recorded live at the 1963 Newport Jazz Festival with a single track ("Selflessness") recorded in a studio in Los Angeles in 1965.

== Background ==
The two tracks from 1963, recorded on July 7 at the Newport Jazz Festival, feature the "classic" Coltrane quartet with Roy Haynes substituting for Elvin Jones, who was a patient at the Lexington Narcotics Hospital/Clinical Research Center in Lexington, Kentucky from mid-April to late July of that year. The tracks were re-released in 1993 on Newport '63 along with an edited version of "Impressions", also recorded at Newport in 1963. (This disc also included a performance of "Chasin' Another Trane" from 1961.) The two tracks were re-released again in 2007, along with a complete version of "Impressions", on My Favorite Things: Coltrane at Newport. (This disc also included two tracks from the Coltrane quartet's performance at Newport in 1965, one of which ("One Down One Up") had previously appeared on the original 1966 LP release of New Thing at Newport, and both of which appeared on the 2000 CD reissue.)

Allmusic reviewer Fred Thomas wrote that "the quartet absolutely crackles with the flowing joy that characterized its sound", and refers to the 1963 Newport performance of "My Favorite Things" as "an amazingly deft rendition", stating that it is "arguably the best version Coltrane put to tape of this favorite". Gary Giddins wrote that the 1963 Newport version of "I Want To Talk About You" is "irresistible", describing it as follows: "Though Coltrane locks onto the melody, he and Haynes renovate the rhythms, beginning leisurely and moving in unison into the knotty, swinging momentum of the second chorus. The drummer monitors the saxophonist's every gesture, provoking him at one point with something akin to a shuffle beat. Instead of playing a third chorus, though, Coltrane returns to the bridge and after sixteen bars embarks on a spellbinding cadenza." Regarding the recording of "My Favorite Things", Giddins wrote that it is "noteworthy for Haynes's aggressive, rousing patterns. Where Elvin Jones creates a landscape of cymbals vibrations, Haynes sticks closer to the skins; where Jones superimposes three over two, Haynes thinks two even when he's playing three, and he varies the triple-meter rhythm with unflagging energy. The piece is an incantatory waltz, sustained by a riveting Tyner solo (the only one he played all evening), after which Coltrane returns with a shout of joy, amplifying his patented tremolos until they reverberate like the ecstatic thundering of two saxophonists."

"Selflessness", the single track from 1965, features the "classic" Coltrane quartet (with Elvin Jones back on drums), supplemented by saxophonist Pharoah Sanders, bassist / clarinetist Donald Garrett, drummer Frank Butler, and vocalist Juno Lewis, who plays percussion. It was later included on the CD reissue of the album Kulu Sé Mama. The track was recorded at Western Recorders studio on October 14, during an eleven day stint at the It Club in Los Angeles, and roughly two weeks after the recording of Live in Seattle (September 30) and Om (October 1). The piece "Kulu Sé Mama (Juno Sé Mama)", which appears on the album Kulu Sé Mama, was recorded during the same session. Both tracks were re-released in 1992 on The Major Works of John Coltrane.

== Reception ==
Allmusic reviewer Fred Thomas wrote that "the 14-plus-minute extended atmospherics of 'Selflessness' find Coltrane ramping up to the free-form spiritual style that he would work in for the short remainder of his life", stating that "it hints at a direction that would be fully articulated later on records like Sun Ship and the gorgeous Concert in Japan." Regarding the juxtaposition on this album of music from very different periods of Coltrane's development, Thomas wrote: "Though the rapid changes in Coltrane's playing between 1963 and 1965 are thoroughly documented on other albums, taken as a whole, the contrast on Selflessness is striking."

== Track listing ==
Side One
No.	Title	Writer(s)	Length
1.	"My Favorite Things"	Richard Rodgers, Oscar Hammerstein	17:31

Side Two
No.	Title	Writer(s)	Length
1.	"I Want to Talk About You"	Billy Eckstine	8:17
2.	"Selflessness"	John Coltrane	15:09
Total length:			40:57

== Personnel ==
"My Favorite Things" and "I Want to Talk About You" (#1, 2), recorded at the Newport Jazz Festival on July 7, 1963

- John Coltrane - soprano saxophone
- McCoy Tyner - piano
- Jimmy Garrison - double bass
- Roy Haynes - drums

"Selflessness" (#3), recorded in Los Angeles on October 14, 1965

- John Coltrane - tenor saxophone
- Pharoah Sanders - tenor saxophone
- Donald Garrett - clarinet, (Note: The credits on the album jacket state that Garrett played bass clarinet on the recording. However, the authors of The John Coltrane Reference, who occasionally present updates to the book on their website (http://wildmusic-jazz.com/jcr_index.htm), provided an update dated 2008 which states that Dutch musician Cornelis Hazevoet sent the following information via an email to author Yasuhiro Fujioka: "Over the years, in liners, books and lists, Don Garrett has been attributed with playing bass clarinet. This is wrong. The man only played bass and clarinet (the small and straight horn, that is)... In 1975, Garrett played in my band and I've specifically asked him about it (because I already felt something was wrong with it). He most specifically and pertinently told me that he never played bass clarinet in his entire life, only the small, straight horn (which he played in my band too)... Perhaps, the error originated from the fact that Garrett was listed somewhere as playing 'bass, clarinet', which subsequently evolved into 'bass clarinet'. Whatever is the case, Garrett did not play bass clarinet on any Coltrane record nor anywhere else.") double bass
- McCoy Tyner - piano
- Jimmy Garrison - double bass
- Elvin Jones - drums
- Frank Butler - drums
- Juno Lewis - vocals, percussion
