= Live at Newport (McCoy Tyner album) =

Live album by McCoy Tyner
- Released: January 9, 1964
- Recorded: July 5, 1963
- Venue: Newport Jazz Festival, Newport, Rhode Island
- Genre: Jazz
- Length: 38:27
- Label: Impulse!
- Producer: Bob Thiele

McCoy Tyner chronology
Nights of Ballads & Blues (1963)	Live at Newport (1964)	Today and Tomorrow (1964)

Professional ratings
Review scores
Source	Rating
AllMusic	4.5/5 stars
The Rolling Stone Jazz Record Guide	4/5 stars

Live at Newport is a live album by the jazz pianist McCoy Tyner. It was released on January 9, 1964, through Impulse! Records. It features performances from bassist Bob Cranshaw and drummer Mickey Roker, with trumpeter Clark Terry and alto saxophonist Charlie Mariano appearing on three of the five tracks.

== Reception ==
The AllMusic review by Stephen Thomas Erlewine states that "It's straight-ahead hard bop in the best possible sense—accessible but stimulating, engaging and vibrant from beginning to end".

== Track listing ==
1. "Newport Romp" (McCoy Tyner) – 7:45
2. "My Funny Valentine" (Lorenz Hart, Richard Rodgers) – 8:03
3. "All of You" (Cole Porter) – 6:24
4. "Monk's Blues" (Tyner) – 7:14
5. "Woody 'n' You" (Dizzy Gillespie) – 9:00

== Personnel ==
- McCoy Tyner – piano
- Bob Cranshaw – bass
- Mickey Roker – drums
- Clark Terry – trumpet (tracks 1, 2 & 5)
- Charlie Mariano – alto saxophone (tracks 1, 2 & 5)
