= Today and Tomorrow (McCoy Tyner album) =

Studio album by McCoy Tyner
- Released: July 1964
- Recorded: June 4, 1963 and February 4, 1964
- Studio: Van Gelder Studio, Englewood Cliffs, New Jersey
- Genre: Jazz
- Length: 38:44 (original LP); 50:43 (CD reissue)
- Label: Impulse! A-63
- Producer: Bob Thiele

McCoy Tyner chronology
| Live at Newport (1964) | Today and Tomorrow (1964) | McCoy Tyner Plays Ellington (1964) |

Professional ratings
Review scores
| Source | Rating |
|---|---|
| Allmusic | 4/5 stars |
| The Rolling Stone Jazz Record Guide | 4/5 stars |

Today and Tomorrow is the fifth album as a leader by jazz pianist McCoy Tyner. It was recorded for the Impulse! label in 1963 and 1964. The two sessions featured trio performances by Tyner with bassist Jimmy Garrison and drummer Albert Heath and then sextet performances with tenor saxophonist John Gilmore, trumpeter Thad Jones, alto saxophonist Frank Strozier, bassist Butch Warren, and drummer Elvin Jones.

== Reception ==
The AllMusic review by Scott Yanow states that "Virtually all of McCoy Tyner's recordings are easily recommended and this CD has more variety than most of his Impulses."

== Track listing ==
All compositions by McCoy Tyner except where noted

1. "Contemporary Focus" – 8:28
2. "A Night in Tunisia" (Gillespie) – 5:07
3. "T 'N A Blues" (Jones) – 4:05
4. "Autumn Leaves" (Kosma) – 6:10
5. "Three Flowers" – 10:12
6. "When Sunny Gets Blue" (Marvin Fisher, Segal) – 4:42

The 1991 remastered edition features a different running order, grouping together the tracks from the two sessions. It also adds three tracks from the second session that were initially released on Impulse's The Definitive Jazz Scene series of LP compilations:

1. "Contemporary Focus" – 8:28
2. "T 'N A Blues" – 4:05
3. "Three Flowers" – 10:12
4. "A Night in Tunisia" – 5:07
5. "Autumn Leaves" – 6:10
6. "When Sunny Gets Blue" – 4:42
7. "You'd Be So Nice to Come Home To" (Porter) – 4:52
8. "Five Spot After Dark" (Golson) – 4:52
9. "Flapstick Blues" – 2:15

Tracks 4–9 recorded on June 4, 1963; tracks 1–3 recorded on February 4, 1964

== Personnel ==
- McCoy Tyner – piano
- John Gilmore – tenor saxophone (tracks 1–3)
- Thad Jones – trumpet (1–3)
- Frank Strozier – alto saxophone (1–3)
- Butch Warren – bass (1–3)
- Elvin Jones – drums (1–3)
- Jimmy Garrison – bass (4–9)
- Albert Heath – drums (4–9)
