= On This Night =

Studio album by Archie Shepp
- Released: 1965
- Recorded: March 9 & August 12, 1965
- Studios: Van Gelder Studio, Englewood Cliffs, NJ
- Genre: Jazz
- Length: 59:43
- Label: Impulse!
- Producer: Bob Thiele

Archie Shepp chronology
Fire Music (1965)	On This Night (1965)	New Thing at Newport (1965)

Professional ratings
Review scores
Source	Rating
AllMusic	4.5/5 stars
The Rolling Stone Jazz Record Guide	4/5 stars

On This Night is an album by Archie Shepp released on Impulse! Records in 1965. The album contains tracks recorded by Shepp, bassist David Izenzon and drummer J. C. Moses in March 1965 and with a larger band in August of that year that included vibraphonist Bobby Hutcherson, bassist Henry Grimes and percussionists Ed Blackwell, Joe Chambers and Rashied Ali.

== Reception ==
The AllMusic review by Al Campbell states: "Among the highlights are a passionate reading of Duke Ellington's 'In a Sentimental Mood' and the title piece, a moving tribute to W. E. B. Du Bois, featuring the haunting soprano vocalist Christine Spencer employing a distinct 20th century classical influence, with Shepp on piano. Shepp is the solo horn on these dates, playing at peak form." The CD version of On This Night includes an alternate take of "The Mac Man" and three of "The Chased" from the Further Fire Music album and a reading of his poem "Malcolm, Malcolm, Semper Malcolm", previously issued on the Fire Music album. The track "Gingerbread, Gingerbread Man" was removed and included as a bonus track on the CD reissue of the John Coltrane/Archie Shepp album New Thing at Newport.

== Original LP track listing ==
1. "The Mac Man" – 7:27
2. "In a Sentimental Mood" (Duke Ellington, Manny Kurtz, Irving Mills) – 3:18
3. "Gingerbread, Gingerbread Boy" – 10:15
4. "On This Night (If That Great Day Would Come)" – 10:00
5. "The Original Mr. Sonny Boy Williamson" – 5:58
6. "The Pickaninny (Picked Clean-No More-Or Can You Back Back Doodlebug)" – 7:22

All compositions by Archie Shepp except as indicated
- Recorded at Van Gelder Studio, Englewood Cliffs, NJ, March 9, 1965 (track 6), and August 12, 1965 (tracks 1,2,4,5) and live at Newport July 2, 1965 (track 3)

== CD reissue track listing ==
1. "On This Night (If That Great Day Would Come)" – 10:00
2. "The Mac Man" – 7:27
3. "The Mac Man" [alternate take] – 9:27
4. "The Original Mr. Sonny Boy Williamson" – 5:58
5. "In a Sentimental Mood" (Duke Ellington, Manny Kurtz, Irving Mills) – 3:18
6. "The Chased" [alternate take] – 11:45
7. "The Chased" [alternate take 2] – 6:13
8. "The Chased" [take 3] – 5:14
9. "The Pickaninny (Picked Clean—No More—Or Can You Back Back Doodlebug)" – 7:22
10. "Malcolm, Malcolm, Semper Malcolm" – 4:50

All compositions by Archie Shepp except as indicated
- Recorded at Rudy Van Gelder Studio, Englewood Cliffs, NJ, March 9, 1965 (tracks 6–10), and August 12, 1965 (tracks 1–5)

== Personnel ==
- Archie Shepp: tenor saxophone, piano, recitation
- Bobby Hutcherson – vibes (tracks 1–5)
- Joe Chambers – drums, timpani (tracks 1 & 5)
- Ed Blackwell – rhythm logs (tracks 2, 3 & 6)
- Henry Grimes – bass (tracks 1–5)
- Rashied Ali – drums (tracks 1–3)
- David Izenzon: bass (tracks 6–10)
- J.C. Moses: drums (tracks 4 & 6–10)
- Christine Spencer: vocals (track 1)
