= The Mastery of John Coltrane / Vol. II: To the Beat of a Different Drum =

The Mastery of John Coltrane / Vol. II: To The Beat of a Different Drum

Compilation album by John Coltrane
- Released: 1978
- Recorded: April 29, 1963, July 7, 1963 and May 26, 1965
- Label: Impulse!

John Coltrane chronology
The Mastery of John Coltrane / Vol. I: Feelin' Good (1978)	The Mastery of John Coltrane / Vol. II: To The Beat of a Different Drum (1978)	The Mastery of John Coltrane / Vol. III: Jupiter Variation (1978)

The Mastery of John Coltrane / Vol. II: To the Beat of a Different Drum, also known as To the Beat of a Different Drum, is a double compilation album by jazz musician John Coltrane released posthumously in 1978. It is a compilation of recordings in which Roy Haynes replaced Coltrane's regular drummer Elvin Jones.

== Recording and release history ==
"Impressions", "I Want to Talk About You" and "My Favorite Things" were recorded live at the Newport Jazz Festival in July 1963. "After the Rain" and "Dear Old Stockholm" are studio recordings from April 1963. "After the Crescent", "One Down, One Up" and "Dear Lord" are studio recordings from May 1965.

The tracks were later reissued on CD by GRP Records: the live recordings on the Newport '63 album and the studio recordings under the title Dear Old Stockholm in 1993. The 1963 Newport tracks were also reissued in 2007 on the compilation My Favorite Things: Coltrane at Newport.

== Reception ==
Professional ratings
Review scores
Source	Rating
The Rolling Stone Jazz Record Guide	4/5 stars
AllMusic	4.5/5 stars

In a review for AllMusic, Scott Yanow wrote, "This LP is well worth acquiring, for it includes two fine numbers from 1963..., a selection from the Quartet's very successful appearance at the 1963 Newport Jazz Festival, and three originals... dating from 1965. It's an excellent release that is both fiery and spiritual."

== Track listing ==
Side 1
No.	Title	Date recorded	Length
1.	"Impressions"	July 7, 1963	15:52
2.	"I Want to Talk About You"	July 7, 1963	8:17

Side 2
No.	Title	Date recorded	Length
1.	"My Favorite Things"	July 7, 1963	17:31
2.	"After the Rain"	April 29, 1963	4:07

Side 3
No.	Title	Date recorded	Length
1.	"Dear Old Stockholm"	April 29, 1963	10:35
2.	"After the Crescent"	May 26, 1965	13:34

Side 4
No.	Title	Date recorded	Length
1.	"One Down, One Up"	May 26, 1965	15:25
2.	"Dear Lord"	May 26, 1965	5:34

== Personnel ==
- John Coltrane – tenor saxophone
- McCoy Tyner – piano
- Jimmy Garrison – bass
- Roy Haynes – drums
