= Kulu Sé Mama =

Studio album by John Coltrane
- Released: January 1967
- Recorded: June 10 & 16, 1965 (2–3, 5–6); October 14, 1965 (#1, 4)
- Studios: Van Gelder (Englewood Cliffs) (2–3, 5, 6); Western (#1, 4)
- Genres: Avant-garde jazz; free jazz
- Length: 34:15 (original LP); 69:33 (CD reissue)
- Label: Impulse! (A-9106)
- Producer: Bob Thiele

John Coltrane chronology
Live at the Village Vanguard Again! (1966)	Kulu Sé Mama (1967)	Expression (1967)

Kulu Sé Mama is a free jazz album by John Coltrane. Recorded during 1965, it was released in January 1967 as Impulse! A-9106 (AS-9106 for the stereo version), and was the last album released during Coltrane's lifetime.

== Background ==
The tracks on Kulu Sé Mama were pieced together from three different recording sessions in 1965. The ballad "Welcome" was recorded by Coltrane's "classic quartet" on June 10 at Van Gelder Studio in Englewood Cliffs, New Jersey, in a session which also produced "Last Blues" (released in 1998 on Living Space) and "Untitled 90314" (released in 1978 on Feelin' Good and in 1998 on Living Space) as well as "Transition" and "Suite" (released in 1970 on Transition). "Welcome" was also reissued on the 1993 CD release of Transition. Coltrane explained that "Welcome" "is that feeling you have when you finally do reach an awareness, an understanding which you have earned through struggle. It is a feeling of peace. A welcome feeling of peace."

On June 16, the quartet visited Van Gelder Studios for a recording session which yielded "Vigil" and the two versions of "Dusk Dawn" which appear as bonus tracks on the CD reissue of Kulu Sé Mama. (The longer version of "Dusk Dawn" was first released on Living Space.) The session also yielded the tracks "Untitled 90320" (released on Feelin' Good) and "Living Space" (released on Feelin' Good, Living Space, and, in a version with overdubbings arranged by Alice Coltrane, on Infinity). According to Coltrane, "Vigil" "implies watchfulness. Anyone trying to attain perfection is faced with various obstacles in life which tend to sidetrack him. Here, therefore, I mean watchfulness against elements that might be destructive - from within or without." He added: "I don't try to set standards of perfection of anyone else. I do feel everyone does try to reach his better self, his full potential, and what that consists of depends on each individual. Whatever that goal is, moving toward it does require vigilance."

During the summer and fall of 1965, Coltrane's music evolved at a rapid pace, and he recorded a series of albums (Ascension, New Thing at Newport, Sun Ship, First Meditations (for quartet), Live in Seattle, Om) between the end of June and October before re-entering the studio on October 14.

By the time of the October 14 session at Western Recorders in Los Angeles, scheduled during an eleven-day stint at the It Club, Coltrane had added tenor saxophonist Pharoah Sanders and multi-instrumentalist Donald Rafael Garrett (both of whom had appeared on Live in Seattle and Om), as well as drummer Frank Butler and vocalist and percussionist Juno Lewis. Together they recorded "Kulu Sé Mama (Juno Sé Mama)" and "Selflessness". The latter appeared as a bonus track on the CD reissue of Kulu Sé Mama, and had previously appeared on Selflessness: Featuring My Favorite Things, released in 1969. Both tracks were reissued in 1992 on the compilation The Major Works of John Coltrane.

The track "Kulu Sé Mama (Juno Sé Mama)" was written by Juno Lewis, who had met Coltrane through a mutual friend four days prior to the recording session. Lewis (1931-2002) was a drummer, drum maker, singer, and composer based in Los Angeles. According to Jon Thurber of the Los Angeles Times, Lewis "showed Coltrane his long work, 'Kulu Se Mama,' a lengthy autobiographical poem that reflected his pride in his ancestors and strong sense of tradition... Coltrane invited Mr. Lewis into a Los Angeles studio to join Coltrane's regular band" for the recording session. "Kulu Sé Mama (Juno Sé Mama)" marked Lewis' first appearance on a recording. He sang in "an Afro-Creole dialect he cites as Entobes" and played "Juolulu, water drums, the Dome Dahka, and... bells and a conch shell." Lewis also played percussion on "Selflessness".

== Reception ==
Professional ratings
Review scores
Source	Rating
AllMusic	3/5 stars
The Penguin Guide to Jazz Recordings	2.5/4 stars
The Rolling Stone Jazz Record Guide	4/5 stars
Sputnikmusic	4.5/5 stars

Scott Yanow of AllMusic commented "Lewis' chanting and colorful percussion make this a unique if not essential entry in Coltrane's discography." All About Jazz reviewer Chris May referred to Kulu Sé Mama as "a vibrant and accessible album" and stated that if the title track "had been created in the 2000s, 'Kulu Se Mama' might be labeled groove or even jam band music." May also wrote: "Kulu Sé Mama is essential listening for anyone interested in the immediate pre-history of astral jazz."

In his album liner notes, Nat Hentoff described the title track as "an absorbing, almost trance-like fusion of tenderness and strength, memory and pride. And fitting its ritual nature, the singing and much of the playing by the horns have the cadences of a chant." Hentoff concludes the notes by stating: "in Coltrane's view of man in the world, there are always further stages to work your way toward. The striving is ceaseless. It is not striving in competition with others, but rather a striving within the self to discover how much more aware one can become."

== Influence ==
A version of "Welcome" appears on the 1973 Santana album titled Welcome. The album was made shortly after Carlos Santana met Alice Coltrane, with whom he would later record. Santana stated: "At that time, I felt my whole existence pulled toward John Coltrane."

== Track listing ==
No.	Title	Recording date	Length
1.	"Kulu Sé Mama (Juno Sé Mama)"	October 14, 1965	18:50
2.	"Vigil"	June 16, 1965	9:51
3.	"Welcome"	June 10, 1965	5:24

CD reissue bonus tracks
No.	Title	Recording date	Length
4.	"Selflessness"	October 14, 1965	14:49
5.	"Dusk Dawn"	June 16, 1965	11:00
6.	"Dusk Dawn (Alternate Take)"	June 16, 1965	9:29

== Personnel ==
- John Coltrane — tenor saxophone
- Elvin Jones — drums
- McCoy Tyner — piano (#1, 3–6)
- Jimmy Garrison — double bass (#1, 3–6)
- Donald Rafael Garrett — clarinet, (Note: The credits on the album jacket state that Garrett played bass clarinet on the recording. However, the authors of The John Coltrane Reference, who occasionally present updates to the book on their website (http://wildmusic-jazz.com/jcr_index.htm), provided an update dated 2008 which states that Dutch musician Cornelis Hazevoet sent the following information via an email to author Yasuhiro Fujioka: "Over the years, in liners, books and lists, Don Garrett has been attributed with playing bass clarinet. This is wrong. The man only played bass and clarinet (the small and straight horn, that is)... In 1975, Garrett played in my band and I've specifically asked him about it (because I already felt something was wrong with it). He most specifically and pertinently told me that he never played bass clarinet in his entire life, only the small, straight horn (which he played in my band too)... Perhaps, the error originated from the fact that Garrett was listed somewhere as playing 'bass, clarinet', which subsequently evolved into 'bass clarinet'. Whatever is the case, Garrett did not play bass clarinet on any Coltrane record nor anywhere else.") double bass, percussion (#1, 4)
- Pharoah Sanders — tenor saxophone, percussion (tracks 1, 4)
- Frank Butler — drums, vocals (#1, 4)
- Juno Lewis — vocals, percussion, conch shell, hand drums (#1, 4)
