= McCoy Tyner Plays Ellington =

Studio album by McCoy Tyner
- Released: August 1965
- Recorded: December 2 & 7–8, 1964
- Studio: Van Gelder Studio, Englewood Cliffs
- Genre: Jazz
- Length: 32:08 original LP; 48:26 CD reissue
- Label: Impulse! A-79
- Producer: Bob Thiele

McCoy Tyner chronology
Today and Tomorrow (1964)	McCoy Tyner Plays Ellington (1965)	The Real McCoy (1967)

Professional ratings
Review scores
Source	Rating
Allmusic	4/5 stars
Down Beat	3/5 stars
The Rolling Stone Jazz Record Guide	3/5 stars
The Penguin Guide to Jazz Recordings	3.5/4 stars

McCoy Tyner Plays Ellington is the sixth album by American jazz pianist McCoy Tyner. It was recorded in December 1964 and released on the Impulse! label in 1965. It features performances by Tyner with his John Coltrane bandmates: bassist Jimmy Garrison and drummer Elvin Jones. Percussionists Willie Rodriguez and Johnny Pacheco appear on four of the tracks. It would be Tyner's last effort for the label, before signing with Blue Note.

== Reception ==
The Allmusic review by Scott Yanow states that "This is an excellent outing that displays both Tyner's debt to the jazz tradition and his increasingly original style".

== Track listing ==
1. "Duke's Place" (Ellington, Katz, Thiele) - 3:18
2. "Caravan" (Ellington, Mills, Tizol) - 3:32
3. "Solitude" (DeLange, Ellington, Mills) - 5:09
4. "Searchin'" (Allen, Ellington) - 4:33
5. "Mr. Gentle and Mr. Cool" (Baker, Ellington) - 6:28
6. "Satin Doll" (Ellington, Mercer, Strayhorn) - 4:10
7. "Gypsy Without a Song" (Ellington, Gordon, Lou Singer, Tizol) - 4:58

Bonus tracks on CD:

8. "It Don't Mean a Thing (If It Ain't Got That Swing)" (Ellington, Mills) - 4:02
9. "I Got It Bad (and That Ain't Good)" (Ellington, Webster) - 5:57
10. "Gypsy Without a Song" [Alternate Take] - 6:14

Recorded on December 2 (#8, 9), 7 (#3, 5, 7, 10) & 8 (#1, 2, 4, 6), 1964

== Personnel ==
- McCoy Tyner - piano
- Jimmy Garrison - bass
- Elvin Jones - drums
- Willie Rodriguez - congas & percussion (tracks 1–2, 4, 6)
- Johnny Pacheco - percussion (tracks 1–2, 4, 6)
