= Live at the Village Vanguard Again! =

Live At The Village Vanguard Again!

Live album by John Coltrane
- Released: December 1966
- Recorded: May 28, 1966
- Venue: Village Vanguard, New York City
- Genre: Free jazz
- Length: 41:40
- Label: Impulse! (A-9124)
- Producer: Bob Thiele

John Coltrane chronology
Meditations (1966)	Live At The Village Vanguard Again! (1966)	Kulu Sé Mama (1967)

Professional ratings
Review scores
Source	Rating
AllMusic	3/5 stars
DownBeat	5/5 stars
The Penguin Guide to Jazz	4/4 stars
The Rolling Stone Jazz Record Guide	5/5 stars

Live At The Village Vanguard Again! is a live jazz album by saxophonist John Coltrane. Recorded in May 1966 during a live performance at the Village Vanguard jazz club in New York City, the album features Coltrane playing in the free jazz style that characterized his final years. The lineup features Coltrane's quintet, with Coltrane on tenor and soprano saxophones, bass clarinet, and flute, Pharoah Sanders on tenor saxophone and flute, Alice Coltrane on piano, Jimmy Garrison on bass, and Rashied Ali on drums, supplemented by Emanuel Rahim on percussion. It was the quintet's only official recording released during Coltrane's lifetime.

== Background ==
Coltrane's group played at the Village Vanguard on two consecutive weekends (May 20–22 and 27-29, 1966), sharing the bill with Clark Terry on the first weekend, and Coleman Hawkins on the second. The album, which was recorded on Saturday, May 28, features two extended pieces, "Naima" and "My Favorite Things", culled from a much longer tape. On both the LP and CD releases, the pieces were issued with the bass solo played by Garrison as an introduction to "My Favorite Things" split out as a separate track titled "Introduction to My Favorite Things".

In his liner notes, Nat Hentoff noted: "Both songs have long been part of the Coltrane repertory, but again Coltrane has found in them the base for new dimensions of expressiveness." Coltrane biographer Eric Nisenson stated that "Coltrane was obviously making a statement about how far he had come since both his first Vanguard album and his first recording of these two pieces. By recording such familiar tunes, he hoped perhaps to give those having difficulty with his new music some sort of familiar territory from which he could jump off to new, unexplored terrain." Ekkehard Jost wrote that "a comparison of the different versions of these two titles is all one needs, to realize the influence of the six years in between on Coltrane's musical development," and stated that, on this album, "Naima" "becomes a launching pad for tension-charged improvisations. Points of contact between them and the original material are established in sporadic fragments of the theme, and hardly at all by harmonic references to the chord progressions. This is a kind of melodic-motivic improvisation that does not take place within the time-boundaries of the theme; those boundaries are stretched or shrunk as prompted by the flow of musical ideas."

== Reception ==
In a review of the concert, Elisabeth van der Mei described the music as "exhilarating," writing: "Rashied Ali has now completely replaced Elvin Jones. Pharaoh Sanders more and more collectively improvises with Coltrane, who himself plays solos for sometimes 30, 40 minutes having his audience transfixed by the sheer mystery of his force." Gary Giddins stated that the album, "with explosive readings of 'Naima' and 'My Favorite Things,' is an unbridled souvenir of Coltrane's last band at its best: nothing mystical or arcane, no verbal chanting, very little scene setting — just two strenuously effective post-Ascension performances."

In a review for AllMusic, Thom Jurek wrote that the album "is certainly not for Coltrane newcomers, and may indeed only hold value for his most ardent followers despite its many qualities." Writing for All About Jazz, Robert Spencer praised Pharoah Sanders' solo on "Naima," writing: "his solo here shows in its melodic invention and fervent lyricism that Coltrane wasn't deaf when he asked him to join the band. He knew he would be able to hold up his end, and he does; too often his work in the late Coltrane quintet is overlooked for its style, rather than appreciated for its real substance." He concluded: "People talk of 'late Coltrane' as if all of his music after A Love Supreme sounded the same, but actually the music on this disc is much removed from the likes of Ascension, Om, or Live in Seattle... Not for all tastes, perhaps, but essential for the musically adventurous."

Ben Ratliff wrote that the recording of "Naima" "worked with wicked effectiveness," and states: "Sanders's solo on this 'Naima' begins with abrasive huffing and scrambling, not dissimilar from a sound Archie Shepp liked to get; it works through wild passages of fast and repetitive playing, terrifically ugly challenges of squelched and shrieking sounds, and hoarse, brawny tours through sections of the melody. The performance is full of personality, full of its own sound, not at all boring. Sanders uses almost purely metamusical logic—intuitive gestures of the emotions, of the nerves—to make the seven-minute solo cohere. With Coltrane, on the other hand, who plays two shorter, more driving and traditionally dramatic solos around Sanders, you always seem to be keeping your eye on the resolution about to come. All that he plays exists in relation to the harmony and melody of the song."

== Track listing ==
1. "Naima" (Coltrane) – 15:10
2. "Introduction to My Favorite Things" (Garrison) – 6:09
3. "My Favorite Things" (Rodgers, Hammerstein) – 20:21

== Personnel ==
- John Coltrane – soprano saxophone, tenor saxophone, bass clarinet, flute
- Pharoah Sanders – tenor saxophone, flute
- Alice Coltrane – piano
- Jimmy Garrison – bass
- Rashied Ali – drums
- Emanuel Rahim – percussion
