= New Thing at Newport =

Live album by John Coltrane and Archie Shepp
- Released: February 1966
- Recorded: July 2, 1965
- Genres: Avant-garde jazz; Free jazz; Hard bop
- Label: Impulse!
- Producer: Bob Thiele

John Coltrane chronology
Ascension (1966)	New Thing at Newport (1966)	The Avant-Garde (1966)

Archie Shepp chronology
On This Night (1965)	New Thing at Newport (1966)	Archie Shepp Live in San Francisco (1966)

Professional ratings
Review scores
Source	Rating
AllMusic	4/5 stars
DownBeat (Original Lp release)	3.5/5 stars
The Penguin Guide to Jazz Recordings	3/4 stars

New Thing at Newport is a 1965 live album featuring two separate sets from that year's Newport Jazz Festival by tenor saxophonists John Coltrane and Archie Shepp. It was recorded four days after the recording session for Coltrane's album Ascension, on which Shepp appeared, and is one of several albums documenting the end stages of Coltrane's "classic quartet," which would begin to break up by the end of that year with the departure of McCoy Tyner.

The Newport 1965 performance of "My Favorite Things" was also included in the 1978 release The Mastery of John Coltrane, Vol. 1: Feelin' Good. "One Down One Up" and "My Favorite Things" were both included in the 2007 compilation My Favorite Things: Coltrane at Newport.

== Reception ==
Reviewer Tim Niland wrote that both of Coltrane's performances are "explosive in their intensity", with "One Down, One Up" "nearly boiling over at times". He stated: "Despite the audacity of the music there are enough hints of melody and the musicians are so obviously sincere in their desire to explore that they are given great support by the audience." Niland concluded: "While the music on this disc must have come as something of a shock to those who were unprepared for it, listening in historical context reveals it to be an excellent example of the rapidly evolving state of jazz in the mid-1960s by two of its most well known practitioners."

In a review for JazzTimes, Mac Randall wrote: "The classic Coltrane quartet was about to split when they played the '65 Newport Festival, and you can kinda tell; the leader is clearly aiming for something that his bandmates can't quite see. And yet the music they make together still packs a major emotional punch... A lot of people didn't like the 'new thing' that Trane and Shepp were offering here. Some still don't. But more than 50 years on, its breadth and depth are impossible to deny."

Writing for All About Jazz, Derek Taylor stated that Coltrane's quartet "works up a lengthy lather on 'One Down, One Up' before launching into a burning rundown of 'My Favorite Things.' Compared to other concert recordings by the quartet the first piece is just below par, though there's still plenty of incendiary fireworks ignited by the four... Coltrane's upper register tenor solo becomes so frenetic on 'One Down, One Up' that there are moments where he moves off mic, but his soprano work on 'My Favorite Things' is nothing short of astonishing, a blur of swirling harmonics that threatens split his horn asunder." Regarding Shepp's set, he wrote that it is "brimming with political overtones and barely contained dysphoria and his sound on tenor is an arresting amalgam of raspy coarseness and delicate lyricism... Shepp and his partners were pulling no punches in exposing the captive audience to their art."

== Track listing ==
=== Original LP release ===
Side One

1. Spoken introduction to John Coltrane's set by Father Norman O'Connor - 1:08
2. "One Down One Up" - 12:28 (from Coltrane's set)
3. "Rufus (Swung His Face at Last to the Wind, Then His Neck Snapped)" - 4:58 (from Shepp's set)

Side Two (from Shepp's set)

1. "Le Matin des Noire" [sic] - 7:39
2. "Scag" - 3:04
3. "Call Me by My Rightful Name" - 6:19

=== CD release ===
From notes: For the first time, the pieces within each set appear here in the order in which they were performed.

1. Spoken introduction to John Coltrane's set by Father Norman O'Connor - 1:08
2. "One Down One Up” - 12:42
3. "My Favorite Things” - 15:14; Spoken conclusion to John Coltrane's set by Father Norman O'Connor
4. Spoken introduction to Archie Shepp's set by Billy Taylor - 1:41
5. "Gingerbread, Gingerbread Boy” - 10:26
6. "Call Me by My Rightful Name” - 6:38
7. "Scag” - 3:19
8. "Rufus (Swung His Face at Last to the Wind, Then His Neck Snapped)” - 5:17
9. "Le Matin des Noire” - 8:20

== Personnel ==
Recorded July 2, 1965, at the Newport Jazz Festival.

The John Coltrane Quartet

- John Coltrane – tenor saxophone on "One Down One Up", soprano saxophone on "My Favorite Things"
- McCoy Tyner – piano
- Jimmy Garrison – double bass
- Elvin Jones – drums

The Archie Shepp Quartet

- Archie Shepp – tenor saxophone, (recitation on "Scag")
- Bobby Hutcherson – vibraphone
- Barre Phillips – double bass
- Joe Chambers – drums
