= Transition (John Coltrane album) =

Studio album by John Coltrane
- Released: July 1970
- Recorded: May 26 & June 10, 1965
- Studios: Van Gelder Studio, Englewood Cliffs, NJ
- Genre: Avant-garde jazz
- Length: 42:23 (Original LP); 52:16 (CD reissue)
- Label: Impulse!
- Producer: Alice Coltrane

John Coltrane chronology
Selflessness: Featuring My Favorite Things (1969)	Transition (1970)	Sun Ship (1971)

Transition is an album of music by jazz saxophonist John Coltrane, recorded in 1965 but released posthumously only in 1970. As its title indicates, Transition was a bridge between classic quartet recordings like A Love Supreme and the more experimental works of Coltrane's last years.

Coltrane's playing alternates between blues idioms and the free jazz that would dominate his final work. Of the four musicians on this album, pianist McCoy Tyner was still the most grounded in traditional jazz. Bassist Jimmy Garrison and drummer Elvin Jones were finding new ways to approach their instruments, while Coltrane took the lead with a newfound musical freedom.

Transition's title track is a fifteen-minute modified blues, whilst "Dear Lord" is a ballad featuring Roy Haynes substituting for Jones on drums. "Welcome," which replaces "Dear Lord" on the album's compact disc release, is a five-minute ballad with a theme pitched high in the tenor saxophone's altissimo register and making extensive use of multiphonics. The closing "Suite" is a twenty-minute performance, covering a variety of moods. "Vigil", which concludes the CD release of the album, is a fiery duet between Coltrane and Jones.

Three months after this recording, Coltrane's quartet moved further into experimental territory with the album Sun Ship.

== Reissues ==
The Impulse! label altered the album's track listing on the first CD edition, removing "Dear Lord" and adding "Welcome" and "Vigil" (both of which had previously appeared on Kulu Sé Mama). However, the 2001 Japanese edition restored the original track listing. "Dear Lord" would later appear on the compilation Dear Old Stockholm.

== Reception ==
Professional ratings
Review scores
Source	Rating
AllMusic	4/5 stars
The Rolling Stone Jazz Record Guide	5/5 stars
Encyclopedia of Popular Music	4/5 stars
The Penguin Guide to Jazz	3.5/4 stars

In his AllMusic review, Fred Thomas awarded the album four stars and wrote: "Transition acts as a neat perforation mark between Coltrane's classic quartet and the cosmic explorations that would follow until Trane's passing in 1967... Spiritually reaching and burningly intense, the quartet is playing at full steam, but still shy of the total free exploration that would follow mere months later on records like Sun Ship and the mystical atonal darkness that came in the fall of that same year with Om."

The authors of The Penguin Guide to Jazz Recordings commented: "Coltrane is plunging into something new, and leaving behind some of the ideas and some of the people who have gone this far on the journey with him... there is an endless quality to the music, a sense that there is no final destination."

== Other versions of tunes ==
The tune "Transition" appears on the album Directions in Music: Live at Massey Hall by Herbie Hancock, Michael Brecker, and Roy Hargrove. "Dear Lord" was recorded by Gary Bartz on the album Coltrane Rules: Tao Music Warrior. A version of "Welcome" appears on the 1973 Santana album titled Welcome.

== Track listing ==
=== Original LP ===
Side A
No.	Title	Length
1.	"Transition"	15:31
2.	"Dear Lord"	5:32

Side B
No.	Title	Length
1.	"Suite: a. "Prayer and Meditation: Day" b. "Peace and After" c. "Prayer and Meditation: Evening" d. "Affirmation" e. "Prayer and Meditation: 4 A.M."	21:20
Total length:		42:23

Recorded on May 26 (#2) and June 10 (#1, 3), 1965. "Dear Lord" would be moved to the CD issue of Dear Old Stockholm with the rest of the sessions from that LP.

=== 1993 CD reissue ===
No.	Title	Length
1.	"Transition"	15:31
2.	"Welcome"	5:34
3.	"Suite: a. "Prayer and Meditation: Day" b. "Peace and After" c. "Prayer and Meditation: Evening" d. "Affirmation" e. "Prayer and Meditation: 4 A.M."	21:20
4.	"Vigil"	9:51
Total length:		52:16

CD track 2 and 4 not part of original LP.

== Personnel ==
- John Coltrane – tenor saxophone
- McCoy Tyner – piano
- Jimmy Garrison – double bass
- Elvin Jones – drums
