= Newport Jazz Festival =

Music festival in Newport, Rhode Island, US

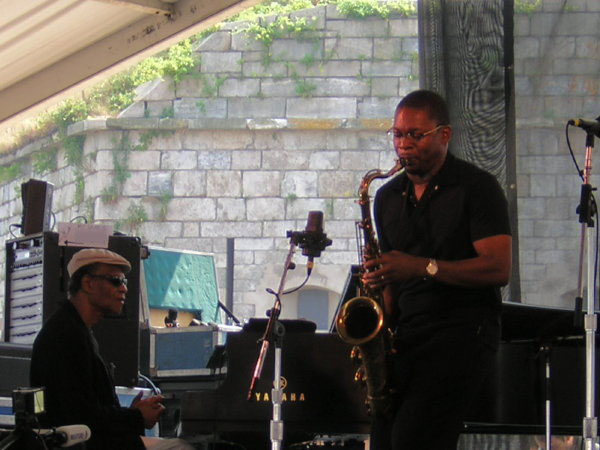
- McCoy Tyner and Ravi Coltrane perform at the Newport Jazz Festival on August 13, 2005.
- Genre: Jazz, rock, pop
- Dates: August
- Locations: Newport, Rhode Island
- Coordinates: 41°29′17″N 71°18′45″W
- Years active: 1954–present
- Founders: George Wein, Elaine Lorillard
- Website: newportjazz.org

The Newport Jazz Festival is an annual American multi-day jazz music festival held every summer in Newport, Rhode Island. Elaine Lorillard established the festival in 1954, and she and husband Louis Lorillard financed it for many years. They hired George Wein to organize the first festival and bring jazz to Rhode Island.

Most of the early festivals were broadcast on Voice of America radio, and many performances were recorded and released as albums. In 1972, the Newport Jazz Festival was moved to New York City. In 1981, it became a two-site festival when it was returned to Newport while continuing in New York. From 1984 to 2008, the festival was known as the JVC Jazz Festival; in the economic downturn of 2009, JVC ceased its support of the festival and was replaced by CareFusion.

The festival is hosted in Newport at Fort Adams State Park. It is often held in the same month as the Newport Folk Festival.

== Festival's establishment at Newport ==
=== 1950s ===
In 1954, the first Newport Jazz Festival (billed as the "First Annual American Jazz Festival") was held at Newport Casino, in the Bellevue Avenue Historic District of Newport, Rhode Island. It incorporated academic panel discussions and featured live musical performances.

While the Newport Jazz Festival was billed in 1954 as the "First Annual American Jazz Festival," earlier large-scale annual jazz festivals had already been established in the United States, most notably the Cavalcade of Jazz, produced by impresario Leon Hefflin Sr. beginning in 1945 at Wrigley Field in Los Angeles.

The live performances were set outdoors, on a lawn. These performances were given by a number of notable jazz musicians, including Billie Holiday, and were emceed by Stan Kenton.

The festival was hailed by major magazines and newspapers, and some 13,000 people attended between the two days. In general, the festival was regarded as a major success.

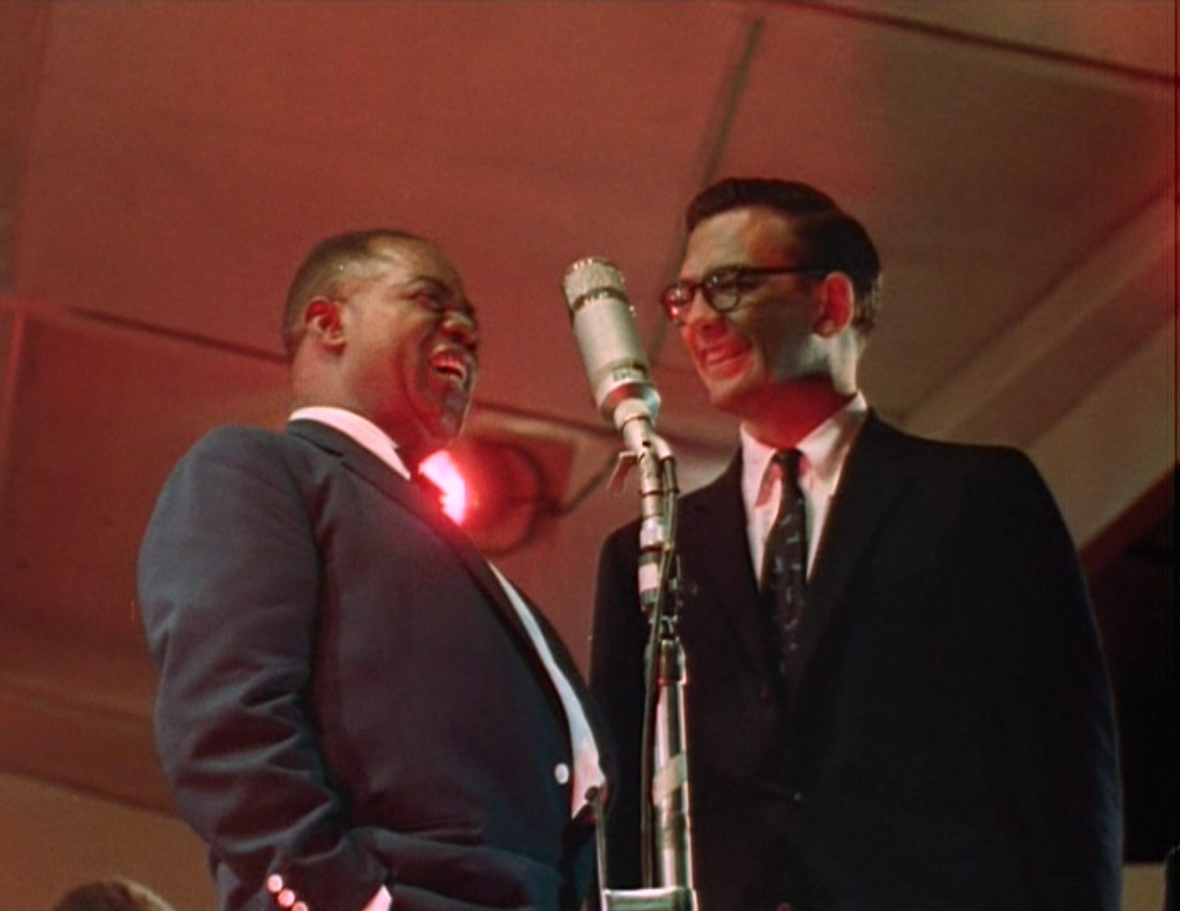
Louis Armstrong and producer Willis Conover, Newport Jazz Festival, 1958

In 1955, organizers were planning a second year for the festival but needed to find a new venue. The Newport Casino would not again host the festival since its lawn and other facilities did not stand up well to such a large event. Festival backer Elaine Lorillard, with her husband, purchased "Belcourt", a large estate which was available locally, in hopes of hosting the festival there. However, the neighborhood disallowed that plan, citing concerns about potential disturbance. Consequently, the workshops and receptions were held at Belcourt, while the music was presented at Freebody Park, an arena for sports located a block behind the casino.

Some Newport residents were opposed to the festival. Jazz appreciation was not common within the established upper-class community, and the festival brought crowds of younger music fans to Newport. Many attendees were students who, in the absence of sufficient lodging, slept outdoors wherever they could, with or without tents. Newport was at first not accustomed to this. Traffic gridlock and other contention near the downtown venue were legitimate concerns. Moreover, many of the musicians and their fans were African American. Racist attitudes were probably a factor in some residents' opposition to the festival too as it commonly was across the country at that time.

Nonetheless, the festival continued annually and increased in popularity, aided in part by 1958 concert footage released as the documentary film Jazz on a Summer's Day the following year.

=== 1960s ===
In 1960, local papers on July 1 noted a string of violent, but minor, incidents in town on the opening Friday. Saturday was much worse, with thousands of people unable to enter the sold-out shows roaming the city streets and battling police. Some 200 people were arrested, a town record. The National Guard was called in. By Sunday word circulated that the Festival would be cancelled. Poet Langston Hughes, on the grounds, wrote an impromptu lyric called "Goodbye Newport Blues" and brought it to Muddy Waters, who was headlining the Sunday blues presentation. They announced a spontaneous performance of the piece with pianist Otis Spann leading the band. Likewise the Nashville All-Stars retreated to their rented mansion and recorded a live album on its porch, called After the Riot at Newport. On Monday the 4th the last two days of the festival were indeed cancelled.

The 1960 event was also notable for the presence of a rival jazz festival that took place at the Cliff Walk Manor Hotel, just a few blocks away. This was organized by musicians Charles Mingus and Max Roach in protest against the festival paying less to jazz innovators, compared to more mainstream performers; the fact that the innovators were mostly black and the mainstream performers mostly white was also an aggravating factor.

In 1961, presentation of the official Newport Jazz Festival was disallowed, due to the difficulties associated with the previous year's festival. In its place, another festival, billed as "Music at Newport", was produced by Sid Bernstein in cooperation with a group of Newport businessmen. That festival included a number of jazz musicians but was financially unsuccessful. Bernstein announced that he would not seek to return to Newport in 1962.

In 1962, the Newport Jazz Festival resumed at Freebody Park. Wein did not resurrect the extinct not-for-profit organization which had run the Newport Jazz Festival through 1960; instead, he freshly incorporated the festival as an independent business venture of his own. He was a music festival pioneer and would run many festivals besides the Newport Jazz Festival during his career.

The 1964 festival was the last at Freebody Park, since the event had outgrown that venue also. Festival organizers saw a need to move the festival outside of the downtown area, since the festival-caused gridlock there was a contentious point in the community. A suitable site, actually a simple but ample field, which would become known as Festival Field, was identified, and the move was completed for the 1965 festival. Frank Sinatra played the festival that year, and new attendance records were set. Festival Field remained the venue for the jazz festival until 1971.

==== 1969 – experimentation and excess crowds ====
The festival's 1969 program was an experiment in fusing jazz, soul, and rock music, and their respective audiences. The Thursday evening set featured performances by jazz musicians Sun Ra, Bill Evans, George Benson, Freddie Hubbard, and Anita O'Day, and a jazz jam session hosted by organist Jimmy Smith and featuring, among others, Art Blakey, Hampton Hawes, Sonny Stitt, and Howard McGhee. Friday afternoon featured a rock-oriented bill featuring the jazz-fusion group Blood, Sweat & Tears, eclectic jazz saxophonist Rahsaan Roland Kirk, and the rock acts The Jeff Beck Group, Ten Years After, and Jethro Tull. Saturday's schedule mixed jazz acts, such as Dave Brubeck and Miles Davis, with rock, blues and R&B artists such as John Mayall, Sly & The Family Stone, Frank Zappa and his band The Mothers of Invention, and O. C. Smith. Sunday's bill featured a morning performance of Brubeck's oratio The Light in the Wilderness, an afternoon set by James Brown, and an evening finale headlined by the British rock band Led Zeppelin, jazz keyboardist Herbie Hancock, blues guitarists B. B. King and Johnny Winter, and jazz drummer Buddy Rich and his orchestra.

Davis remarked that the various artists involved were highly encouraging to each other and that he enjoyed the festival more than ever before. He also noticed and appreciated the spirited nature of the younger audience.

But some clashes did occur. Excess crowds, estimated at 50,000, who had been unable to obtain tickets filled an adjacent hillside, and the weekend was marred by disturbances, including fence crashing and crowd surging, during the most popular performances. Saturday evening's disturbances were particularly significant, prompting producer George Wein, who feared a riot, to announce that the Sunday evening Led Zeppelin appearance was cancelled. That show was allowed to go forward as initially scheduled after much of the overflow crowd had left the city, following the cancellation announcement.

=== 1970s ===
The 1970 festival was three days instead of the usual four with an estimated attendance of 40,400. Promoter George Wein reverted to an all-jazz policy after he stated the previous year had "maybe too much rock." On the first day there was a tribute to Louis Armstrong featuring Dizzy Gillespie, Bobby Hackett, Joe Newman, Wild Bill Davison, Jimmy Owns, and Ray Nance. Mahalia Jackson made a rare festival appearance to pay respects to Armstrong. Saturdays performers included Nina Simone and the Herbie Mann Quintet with Ike & Tina Turner closing out the night. The festival concluded on Sunday with performances from Roberta Flack, Gene McDaniels, Buddy Rich and Ella Fitzgerald.

For 1971, the festival booked the rock group The Allman Brothers Band alongside an otherwise predominantly jazz and soul-oriented bill that included performances by Aretha Franklin, Ray Charles, Duke Ellington, Roberta Flack, Charles Mingus, Ornette Coleman, Dionne Warwick, Dave Brubeck, King Curtis, Dizzy Gillespie, and Herbie Mann, as well as the jazz-fusion groups Chase, Soft Machine, and Weather Report. Many more fans were drawn than Festival Field could accommodate. On the second night, after the recording of what would become The Dave Brubeck Quartet featuring Gerry Mulligan – The Last Set at Newport, over 12,000 people on the adjacent hillside crashed the fence during Dionne Warwick's performance of "What the World Needs Now Is Love". The festival was halted after the stage was rushed and equipment destroyed. The festival would not return to Newport in 1972.

==== Moving to New York City ====
In 1972, festival producer George Wein transplanted the festival to New York City, calling it the Newport Jazz Festival-New York. An expanded format involved multiple venues, including Yankee Stadium and Radio City Music Hall, and comprised 30 concerts with 62 performers including Dave Brubeck, Ray Charles, Duke Ellington, Roberta Flack, and Dizzy Gillespie. This format continued for the next years, but Wein missed the outdoors of Newport which the venues of New York City failed to duplicate.

In 1977, Wein worked with the city of Saratoga Springs, New York, to move the festival to the Saratoga Performing Arts Center during the following year. He established the Newport Jazz Festival-Saratoga and remained in New York City, retaining the Newport Jazz Festival-New York in what amounted to an expansion. The Saratoga addition began a trend of using the "Newport Jazz Festival" name outside of Newport, as in the Newport Jazz Festival in Madarao, Japan, from 1982 to 2004.

During the 1970s, the Newport Jazz Festival pioneered corporate sponsorship of music festivals. Working with Schlitz and KOOL, the festival changed its name based on what company was sponsoring.

=== 1980s ===
==== Return to Newport in 1981 ====
In 1981, George Wein brought the Newport Jazz Festival back to Newport, partly to preserve the Newport Jazz Festival legacy and to protect his interest in the Newport Jazz Festival name. Arrangements with the title sponsor of the Newport Jazz Festival-New York had seen that festival promoted as the "Kool Jazz Festival". The revived festival took place at Fort Adams State Park, where it has remained since.

Newport, now quite keen to tourism, was extremely receptive to the resumption of its Newport Jazz Festival. The 1981 bill featured a lineup entirely of jazz performers, including McCoy Tyner, Dexter Gordon, Miles Davis, Dave Brubeck, Dizzy Gillespie, and Art Blakey. The festival was immediately successful upon returning to Newport, although no longer quite the draw it had been in its first years, owing to shifting interests and to the proliferation of competing festivals. Future installments in the 1980s and 1990s also predominantly featured jazz performers, although acts in other genres continued to appear sporadically, including return performances by B.B. King and Ray Charles in 1984, and blues rock guitarist Stevie Ray Vaughan and his band Double Trouble in 1985. In 1988, the festival began also hosting annual concerts at the Newport Casino, where the first festival was held in 1954, with performers such as Tony Bennett, Mel Tormé, Illinois Jacquet, k.d. lang, Diana Krall, Ray Charles, Harry Connick Jr., and Wynton Marsalis.

JVC became the primary sponsor of the festival in 1984; Wein stated that the audio-visual equipment company, which had recently developed the VHS video cassette, offered a sponsorship package, and Kool agreed to withdraw its sponsorship for financial reasons. That year the event was renamed the JVC Jazz Festival. That year's lineup reflected a shift away from an almost exclusive focus on mainstream jazz, and introduced blues, soul, and experimental jazz performers. Performers included Charles, Gillespie, Davis, Ron Carter, and Flora Purim. Coverage in The Providence Journal characterized the lineup as "the most exciting in at least five years." The festival drew a varied crowd of 7,000 that year.

=== 1990s ===
The festival continued to take place annually at Fort Adams through the 1990s and 2000s. Along with established jazz performers such as Wynton Marsalis and George Benson, the festival also featured contemporary jazz musicians, as well as appearances from artists who performed other, related genres. These included: Tito Puente and Celia Cruz (1990), Tower of Power (1992), Thomas Chapin (1995), Medeski Martin & Wood (1997), Femi Kuti, Cassandra Wilson, John Zorn, and Maceo Parker (2000), Isaac Hayes (2002), Pat Metheny (2003), and Dr. John (2006).

Bassist Christian McBride made his Jazz Festival debut in 1991 as part of the Jazz Futures ensemble of young jazz musicians that also featured Roy Hargrove and Antonio Hart. In 2016, McBride was selected as the festival's artistic director and lineup curator.

=== 2000s ===
In early 2007, Newport Jazz Festival producer George Wein sold his Festival Productions company to Festival Network, a company operated by former Shoreline Media executive Chris Shields. Festival Networked owned and operated the Newport Jazz Festival with Wein in a senior position.

Starting in 2007, the Newport festival began serving beer and wine at Fort Adams State Park.

Wein began running the festival again in 2009 after the company that owned the event experienced financial difficulty. In 2011, Wein established the non-profit Newport Festivals Foundation, which has operated the jazz and folk festivals since.

The 2020 festival was cancelled due to the COVID-19 pandemic crisis. Booked artists were invited to return in 2021. Citing his advancing age and the pandemic, founder George Wein was unable to attend the 2021 Newport Jazz Festival; it was only the third time he was not in attendance since the event's founding in 1954. Wein died on September 13, 2021.

== Notable performances and recordings ==
Two of the most famous performances in the festival's history are Miles Davis' 1955 solo on "'Round Midnight" and the Duke Ellington Orchestra's lengthy 1956 performance of "Diminuendo and Crescendo in Blue", featuring a 27-chorus saxophone solo by Paul Gonsalves.

A reconstructed Ellington at Newport, from his 1956 performance, was re-issued in 1999. Aside from the actual festival performance of "Diminuendo and Crescendo in Blue", including the distant-sounding Gonsalves solo, the original album used re-creations, note for note, of some of the set's highlights, which were re-recorded in the studio. The new set restored the original festival performance after a recording from the Voice of America (which broadcast the performance) was discovered and, among other things, the odd timbre of the Gonsalves performance. Gonsalves, it turned out, stepped up to the wrong microphone to play his legendary solo; he stepped up to the VOA's microphone and not the band's. Gonsalves' performance so excited the audience that the festival sponsors feared that the crowd was on the verge of rioting.

The 1957 festival was well documented by Verve Records, which released 12 albums of recorded performances. The 1957 performances of Ella Fitzgerald, Billie Holiday, and Carmen McRae were released on the album Ella Fitzgerald and Billie Holiday at Newport (1958). Those by the Gigi Gryce-Donald Byrd Jazz Laboratory and the Cecil Taylor Quartet featuring Steve Lacy were released on At Newport (1958). The performance of Count Basie was issued as Count Basie at Newport in 1958. The notable film Jazz on a Summer's Day was made from footage of the 1958 Newport Jazz Festival featuring such performers as Louis Armstrong, Anita O'Day and Mahilia Jackson. The film and its soundtrack have been widely released on VHS, DVD, Vinyl and CD.

Performances at the 1960 festival by Muddy Waters and Nina Simone were released as the albums At Newport 1960 and Nina Simone at Newport (1960).

The 1962 Festival is documented in a film released by Storyville Records. Among the performers are Lambert, Hendricks & Bavan, the Oscar Peterson Trio, Roland Kirk, Duke Ellington, and the Count Basie Orchestra featuring Jimmy Rushing, at the closing.

Part of the appearances by John Coltrane and Archie Shepp from the 1965 Festival appeared on the album New Thing at Newport. A set by Herbie Mann featuring Chick Corea, at that same year's festival, was released on the album Standing Ovation at Newport. Mann also released an album, mostly recorded at that performance, titled New Mann at Newport (1967).

Albert Ayler's performance at the 1967 festival was released as part of the Holy Ghost: Rare & Unissued Recordings (1962–70) box set (2004).

An Ella Fitzgerald performance from Carnegie Hall in July 1973 was documented on the album Newport Jazz Festival: Live at Carnegie Hall (1973).

=== Albums recorded at the Newport Jazz Festival ===
Albums feature recordings from the jazz festival in the year of the album's release, unless otherwise noted

- Dave Brubeck Quartet with J. J. Johnson and Kai Winding - Dave Brubeck and Jay & Kai at Newport (1956)
- Duke Ellington - Ellington at Newport (1956)
- Duke Ellington and Buck Clayton - Duke Ellington and the Buck Clayton All-Stars at Newport (1956)
- Toshiko Akiyoshi and Leon Sash - Toshiko and Leon Sash at Newport (1957)
- Count Basie - Count Basie at Newport (1957)
- The Ruby Braff Octet with Pee Wee Russell and Bobby Henderson - The Ruby Braff Octet with Pee Wee Russell & Bobby Henderson at Newport (1957)
- Eddie Costa, Mat Mathews, and Don Elliott - Eddie Costa, Mat Mathews & Don Elliott at Newport (1957)
- Dizzy Gillespie - Dizzy Gillespie at Newport (1957)
- The Coleman Hawkins All Stars with Roy Eldridge, Pete Brown and Jo Jones - The Coleman Hawkins, Roy Eldridge, Pete Brown, Jo Jones All Stars at Newport (1957)
- George Lewis and Turk Murphy - George Lewis & Turk Murphy at Newport (1957)
- Oscar Peterson - The Oscar Peterson Trio with Sonny Stitt, Roy Eldridge and Jo Jones at Newport (1957)
- Teddy Wilson and Gerry Mulligan - The Teddy Wilson Trio & Gerry Mulligan Quartet with Bob Brookmeyer at Newport (1957)
- Dave Brubeck Quartet - Newport 1958 (1958)
- Ray Charles - Ray Charles at Newport (1958)
- Duke Ellington - Newport 1958 (1958)
- Ella Fitzgerald and Billie Holiday - Ella Fitzgerald and Billie Holiday at Newport (1958; recorded at the 1957 festival)
- The Gigi Gryce–Donald Byrd Jazz Laboratory and the Cecil Taylor Quartet - At Newport (1958; recorded at the 1957 festival)
- Max Roach - Max Roach + 4 at Newport (1958)
- Dinah Washington - Newport '58 (1958)
- Randy Weston and Lem Winchester - New Faces at Newport (1958)
- The Nashville All-Stars - After the Riot at Newport (1960)
- Nina Simone - Nina Simone at Newport (1960)
- Muddy Waters - At Newport 1960 (1960)
- Quincy Jones - Newport '61 (1961)
- Lambert, Hendricks & Bevan - At Newport '63 (1963)
- Herbie Mann - Herbie Mann Live at Newport (1963)
- Joe Williams - At Newport '63 (1963)
- Miles Davis and Thelonious Monk - Miles & Monk at Newport (1964; recorded at the 1963 festival)
- McCoy Tyner - Live at the Newport (1964; recorded at the 1963 festival)
- Herbie Mann - Standing Ovation at Newport (1965)
- John Coltrane and Archie Shepp - New Thing at Newport (1966; recorded at the 1965 festival)
- The Jazz Crusaders - The Festival Album (1966)
- Herbie Mann - New Mann at Newport (1967)
- John Coltrane - Selflessness: Featuring My Favorite Things (1969; includes material from the 1963 festival)
- Eddie Harris - Live at Newport (1970)
- Dave Brubeck - The Last Set at Newport (1972; recorded at the 1971 festival)
- Ray Charles - Ray Charles Live (1973; includes material from the 1958 festival)
- Miles Davis and John Coltrane - Miles & Coltrane (1988; includes material from the 1958 festival)
- John Coltrane - Newport '63 (1993; recorded at the 1963 festival)
- Sarah Vaughan - Linger Awhile: Live at Newport and More (2000, includes material from the 1958 festival)
- Miles Davis - At Newport 1958 (2001; recorded at the 1958 festival)
- John Coltrane - My Favorite Things: Coltrane at Newport (2007; recorded at the 1963 and 1964 festivals)
- Horace Silver - Live at Newport '58 (2008; recorded at the 1958 festival)
- Dave Douglas - United Front: Brass Ecstasy at Newport (2010)
- Miles Davis - Bitches Brew Live (2011; includes material recorded at the 1969 festival)
- Miles Davis - Miles Davis at Newport 1955–1975: The Bootleg Series Vol. 4 (2015; includes material from the 1955, 1958, 1966, 1967, and 1969 festivals)
- Joe Lovano - Classic! Live at Newport (2016; recorded at the 2005 festival)

== Festival lineups ==
Past performers at the Newport Jazz Festival include:

- 1954: Eddie Condon, Lee Wiley, Dizzy Gillespe Quintet, Lee Konitz Quartet, Oscar Peterson Trio, Gerry Mulligan Quartet, Ella Fitzgerald, Johnny Smith, George Shearing Quintet, Gil Melle Quartet, Billie Holiday, Gene Krupa Trio
- 1955: Stan Rubin and His Tigertown Five, Teddi King, Erroll Garner Trio, Woody Herman Orchestra, Roy Eldridge-Coleman Hawkins, Louis Armstrong All-Stars, Max Roach-Clifford Brown Quintet, Dinah Washington, Chet Baker Quartet, Marian McPartland trio, Dave Brubeck Quartet, Miles Davis, Count Basie and His Orchestra
- 1956: Toshiko, Sara Vaughan, Eddie Condon, Charlie Mingus' Jazz Workshop, Jutta Hipp, Count Basie and His Orchestra, J.J. Johnson and Kai Winding, Dave Brubeck Quartet, Ella Fitzgerald, Louis Armstrong All-Stars, Phineas Newborn Quartet, Teddy Charles Tentet, Duke Ellington Orchestra, Bud Shank Quartet, Teddy Wilson Trio, Jimmy Giuffre Quartet, Anita O'Day, Friedrich Guida, Chico Hamilton Quintet, Mario Patron Trio
- 1957: The George Lewis Band, Bobby Henderson, The Henry Red Allen Band, Ella Fitzgerald, The Louis Armstrong All-Stars, The Ruby Braff Octet with Peewee Russell, The Toshiko Akiyoshi Trio, The Kai Winding Septet, The Gigi Gryce-Donald Byrd Jazz Laboratory, Mat Mathews, The Bernard Peiffer Trio, The Leon Sash Quartet, The Cannonball Adderley Quintet, The Bobby Hackett Sextet, Carmen McRae, The George Shearing Quintet, The All Stars, The Erroll Garner Trio, The Stan Kenton Orchestra, The Cecil Taylor Quartet, The Jimmy Smith Trio, Eddie Costa, The Don Elliott Quartet, Jackie Paris, Joe Castro, The Horace Silver Quintet, The Farmington School Band, The Turk Murphy Band, Chris Connor, The Dave Brubeck Quartet, The Gerry Mulligan Quartet, Billie Holiday, The Dizzy Gillespie Orchestra, The Eartha Kitt Dance Group, Mary Lou Williams, The Ward Singers, The Back Home Choir, Mahalia Jackson, Jimmy Giuffre Trio, Sarah Vaughan, The Count Basie Orchestra.
- 2019: Sun Ra Arkestra, Darcy James Argue's Secret Society, Corinne Bailey Rae, Thundercat, Herbie Hancock, Mwenso & The Shakes, Kandace Springs, Spanish Harlem Orchestra, Gary Bartz Another Earth, The Bad Plus, Berklee Global Jazz Workshop Ensembles, Domi & JD Beck, Tia Fuller, Women of the World, Billy Hart Quartet, Mark Stryker: Jazz From Detroit, Ben Morris Quintet, Tom Oren, Alphonso Horne, Dayna Stephens Group, Ralph Peterson & The Messenger Legacy, Dee Dee Bridgewater & The Memphis Soulphony, Buika, Dianne Reeves, The Royal Bopsters ft: Sheila Jordan, Ravi Coltrane/David Virelles, Makaya McCraven, Hancock/McBride/Colaiuta, Ghost Note, URI Big Band, Joel Ross "Good Vibes", Jenny Scheinman & Allison Miller's Parlour Game, James Francies' Flight, Ron Carter Trio, Sophisticated Giant, Brandon Goldberg, Brian Marsella, Lauren Talese, Hailu Mergia, Christian Sands 3 Piano Erroll Garner Tribute, Dafnis Prieto Big Band, Terence Blanchard ft: The E Collective, Tank and the Bangas, Common, Sammy Miller and the Congregation, In: Common, Sons of Kemet, PJ Morton, Cécile McLorin Salvant, RI Music Education Association Sr. All State Jazz Ensemble, Marcus Strickland Twi-life, Camila Meza & The Nectar Orchestra, Aaron Diehl, Elew, Phil Madeira Trio, Eric Wurlzelbacher Quartet, The New String Quartet, Matana Roberts, Lauren Sevian/ Helen Sung Duo.
- 2020: Cancelled Due To COVID-19
- 2021: "Newport Jazz Presents" Wynton Marsalis, Andra Day, Khruangbin, Trombone Shorty & Orleans Avenue, Mavis Staples, Ledisi (Sings Nina Simone), Robert Glasper, The Jam Jawn, A Christian McBride Situation, Cory Wong, Charles Lloyd, Yola, Makaya McCraven, Jazz Gallery All-Stars, Terri Lyne Carrington + Social Science, Chris Potter Ciscuits Trio, Arturo & Adam O'Farrill, The Bogie Band, Catherine Russell, Immanuel Wilkins.
- 2022: Norah Jones, McBride's Newport Jawn, Terence Blanchard, BadBadNotGood, Lettuce, Nate Smith + Kinfolk, Benevento/Russo Duo Acoustic, Nicholas Payton Trio, Shabaka Hutchings, The Baylor Project, Pino Palladino, Blake Mills, Sam Gendel & Abe Rounds, Dan Wilson, Celisse, Theon Cross, Thana Alexa: Ona, The Mingus Big Band, Digable Planets, Jazz is Dead, The Fearless Flyers, Esperanza Spalding, Cécile McLorin Salvant, Cory Wong, Sons of Kemet, Jazzmeia Horn, Jack Dejohnette Quartet, Maria Schneider Orchestra, Makaya McCraven, Yussef Dayes, Antonio Sanchez & Bad Hombre, Joe Lovano "Trio Tapestry", Sullivan Fortner, Lady Blackbird, Samara Joy, Melanie Charles, Giveton Gelin, Holly Bowling, Celebrating George Wein, Angélique Kidjo's Remain in Light, PJ Morton, The Ron Carter Quartet, Nubya Garcia, Jazz is Dead Presents, Jason Moran & The Bandwagon, Mononeon, The Soul Rebels, Melissa Aldana, The Nth Power, Vijay Iyer Trio, Takuya Kuroda, Tuba Skinny, Sampa The Great, Emmet Cohen Trio, Laufey
- 2023: Joe Russo's Almost Dead w/ Branford Marsalis, Kamasi Washington, DJ Pee Wee (Anderson .Paak), Soulive, Domi & JD Beck, Immanuel Wilkins Quartet, Big Freedia, Alfa Mist, Durand Jones, Dave Holland New Quartet, Butcher Brown, Derrick Hodge, Endea Owens & The Cookout, Angel Bat Dawid & Tha Brothahood, Lakecia Benjamin & Phoenix, Julius Rodriguez, Lauren Sevian's LSQ, Jon Batiste, Thundercat, Big Gigantic Does Jazz, Christian McBride's Jam Jawn, Charles Lloyd New Quartet, Aron Aftab Vijay Iyer and Shahzad Ismaily, Superblue, Julian Lage, Orrin Evan's Quintet, The War and Treaty, Keyon Harrold, Armstrong Now, Bobby Watson All Star Quintet, Jennifer Hartswick & Nick Cassarino Duo, James Brandon Lewis, Camille Thurman with The Darrell Green Quartet, Herbie Hancock, Diana Krall, Samara Joy, The Soul Rebels ft: Rakim and Talib Kweli, Cimafunk, A Moodswing Reunion, Marcus Miller, Scary Gouldings, Cautious Clay, Somi, Adi Oasis, Pedrito Martinez, Bill Charlap Trio, Charles McPherson Quintet, Melvis Santa & Jazz Orishas, Claudia Acuna, Matthew Whitaker, Branford Marsalis, Louis Cato.
- 2024: Andre 3000, Nile Rodgers & Chic, Kamasi Washington, Elvis Costello, Laufey (singer), Robert Glasper, Brittany Howard, Cory Wong, Dinner Party: ft: Terrace Martin Robert Glasper and Kamasi Washington, Thievery Corporation, Samara Joy, NoName, PJ Morton, Galactic with Irma Thomas, Moonchild, Terrace Martin and Calvin Keys, Cimafunk, Ghost Note, Shabaka, Christian McBride's Jam Jawn, Meshell Ndegeocello, Artemis, Chief Adjuah, Aja Monet, Sun Ra Arkestra, Julius Rodriguez, Makaya McCraven, Jeff Parker, Stanley Clark N 4-Ever, Lianne La Havas, Bill Frisell Four ft: Jonathan Blake Gerald Clayton and Gregory Tardy, Acid Jazz Is Dead ft: DJS Adrian Youge, Ali Shaheed Muhammad & Special Guests, Alex Isley, Anat Cohen Quartetinho, Kenny Barron Trio, Jaleel Shaw, Legacy of Wayne Shorter ft: Danilo Perez John Patitucci, Terri Lyne Carrington & Ravi Coltrane, Kassa Overall, Theo Croker, Aneesa Strings, Jonathan Blake & Pentad, Cisco Swank, The Messthetics & James Brandon Lewis, Amaro Freitas, Nicole Zuraitis, Riley Mulherkar, Sunday Jazz.

== See also ==
- Category:Albums recorded at the Newport Jazz Festival
- List of jazz festivals § Historic jazz festivals
- List of historic rock festivals
