= The John Coltrane Quartet Plays =

Studio album by John Coltrane
- Released: August 1965
- Recorded: February 17–18 and May 17, 1965
- Studio: Van Gelder (Englewood Cliffs)
- Genres: Post-bop; modal jazz; avant-garde jazz
- Length: 37:52 original LP; 59:23 CD reissue
- Labels: Impulse! A-85
- Producer: Bob Thiele

John Coltrane chronology
A Love Supreme (1965)	The John Coltrane Quartet Plays (1965)	Ascension (1966)

The John Coltrane Quartet Plays (full title The John Coltrane Quartet Plays Chim Chim Cheree, Song of Praise, Nature Boy, Brazilia) is an album by the jazz musician John Coltrane, recorded in February and May 1965, shortly after the release of A Love Supreme.

In 1997, Impulse! Records reissued the remastered album on CD, with three additional tracks.

== Background ==
The February and May 1965 recording sessions bracketed a period during which Coltrane's music continued to evolve at a rapid pace, and document a time of transition. The tracks recorded on February 17 and 18 featured two bass players (Jimmy Garrison and Art Davis), and may be seen as a continuation of experiments begun by Coltrane in 1961 involving multiple basses, often with one playing arco and the other playing pizzicato. In March, Coltrane and his group played at the Half Note; recordings of some of these performances were released on Live at the Half Note: One Down, One Up, about which one reviewer stated: it "captures Coltrane's music on the cusp of major change, just weeks before embarking on the last phase of his career — during which he expunged from his music every last speck of convention," and "documents the classic quartet near the end of its incredible run... The music reveals the band at its creative peak, reaching heights of focused intensity on every tune, stretching rhythmic and harmonic conventions to the breaking point."

On March 28, Coltrane participated in a benefit concert at the Village Gate, organized and produced by LeRoi Jones, and also featuring groups led by Albert Ayler, Archie Shepp, Grachan Moncur III, and Charles Tolliver. The music recorded that day was released on The New Wave in Jazz, and served to solidify Coltrane's association with the avant-garde. (Coltrane's performance of "Nature Boy" was also included as a bonus track on the CD reissue of The John Coltrane Quartet Plays.) Given Coltrane's success, recognition, and respect within the jazz community, his appearance on the concert "seemed to validate the most daring music of the time." Coltrane played additional concerts at the Half Note in April and early May (recordings of which were also included on Live at the Half Note: One Down, One Up), before returning to the studio on May 17 to record the remaining tracks on The John Coltrane Quartet Plays.

Witnesses to Coltrane's concerts during this time period recalled their reactions in vivid terms. Writer Dan Morgenstern heard Coltrane at one of the Half Note performances, and stated: "The intensity that was generated was absolutely unbelievable... I can still feel it, and it was unlike any other feeling within the music we call jazz." Saxophonist Joe McPhee attended the Village Gate concert, and recalled: "I thought I was going to die from the emotion... I'd never experienced anything like that in my life. I thought I was just going to explode right in the place. The energy level kept building up, and I thought, God almighty, I can't take it."

== Reception ==
Professional ratings
Review scores
Source	Rating
AllMusic	4/5 stars
The Penguin Guide to Jazz	3.5/4 stars
Record Mirror	3/5 stars
The Rolling Stone Jazz Record Guide	4/5 stars
Down Beat	4.5/5 stars

AllMusic reviewer Scott Yanow called the album "a perfect introduction for listeners to Coltrane's last period."

All About Jazz reviewer Robert Spencer noted that "all through this recording the intensity has been turned up a notch since A Love Supreme, the immediately preceding quartet recording... The music is often arresting and moving, but it certainly does seem as if the calm attainment of A Love Supreme has somehow been broken." He called the album "great music from a great musician" and "an invaluable record of a man struggling to attain to greater clarity of vision."

The authors of The Penguin Guide to Jazz wrote: "What problems Coltrane was experiencing or what degree of emotional and creative burn-out he might have felt after A Love Supreme we don't know. It's clear that, as ever, his mind is searching in new directions... Plays is a fine record and the interaction of the group, both standard and augmented, is faultless. It is, however, a difficult item to place personally and artistically."

== Track listing ==
All music is composed by John Coltrane, except as noted.

No.	Title	Writer(s)	Recording date	Length
1.	"Chim Chim Cheree"	Sherman Brothers	May 17, 1965	6:58
2.	"Brazilia"		May 17, 1965	12:56
3.	"Nature Boy"	eden ahbez	February 18, 1965	8:03
4.	"Song of Praise"		May 17, 1965	9:56

1997 CD reissue/remaster bonus tracks
No.	Title	Writer(s)	Recording date	Length
5.	"Feeling Good"	Leslie Bricusse, Anthony Newley	February 18, 1965	6:25
6.	"Nature Boy" (First Version)		February 17, 1965	7:06
7.	"Nature Boy" (Live at the Village Gate)		March 28, 1965	8:00

- A brief passage of applause has been crudely spliced onto the end of "Nature Boy (Live)".

== Personnel ==
=== John Coltrane Quartet ===
- John Coltrane – tenor saxophone, soprano saxophone
- McCoy Tyner – piano
- Jimmy Garrison – bass
- Art Davis – bass (3, 5, and 6 with Garrison)
- Elvin Jones – drums
