= Jimmy Garrison =

American jazz double bassist (1934–1976)

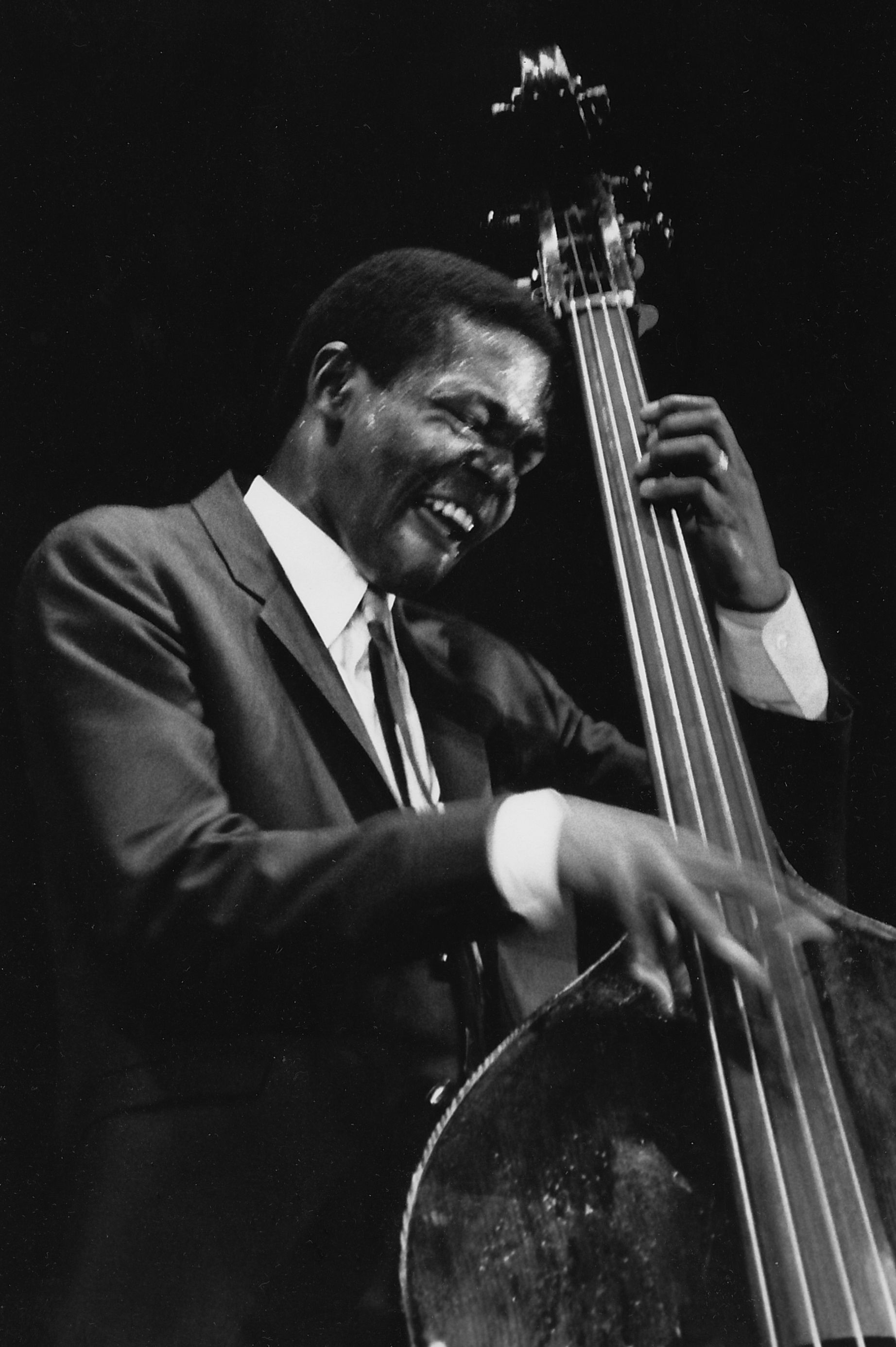
- Garrison, c. 1960s

Background information
- Born: James Emory Garrison; March 3, 1934; Miami, Florida, U.S.
- Died: April 7, 1976 (aged 42) New York City, U.S.
- Genres: Jazz; modal jazz; free jazz; hard bop; post-bop; avant-garde jazz
- Occupation: Musician
- Instrument: Double bass
- Years active: 1957–1976
- Label: Impulse!
- Formerly of: John Coltrane Quartet; Ornette Coleman

James Emory Garrison (March 3, 1934 – April 7, 1976) was an American jazz double bassist. He is best remembered for his association with John Coltrane from 1961 to 1967.

== Career ==
Garrison was born in Miami, Florida, and moved to Philadelphia at age ten, where he learned to play bass during his senior year of high school. Garrison came of age in the 1950s Philadelphia jazz scene, which included fellow bassists Reggie Workman and Henry Grimes, pianist McCoy Tyner, and trumpeter Lee Morgan. Garrison was in a short-lived trio started by Bill Evans, with Kenny Dennis on drums, in the 1950s. Between 1957 and 1962, Garrison played and recorded with trumpeter Kenny Dorham; clarinetist Tony Scott; drummer Philly Joe Jones; and saxophonists Bill Barron, Lee Konitz, and Jackie McLean, as well as Curtis Fuller, Benny Golson, Lennie Tristano, and Pharoah Sanders, among others. In 1961, Garrison recorded with Ornette Coleman, appearing on Coleman's albums Ornette on Tenor and The Art of the Improvisers. He also worked with Walter Bishop Jr. and Cal Massey during the early years of his career.

He formally joined Coltrane's quartet in 1962, replacing Workman. The long trio blues "Chasin' the Trane" is one of his first recorded performances with Coltrane and Elvin Jones. Garrison performed on many Coltrane recordings, including A Love Supreme. After John Coltrane's death, Garrison worked and recorded with Alice Coltrane, Hampton Hawes, Archie Shepp, Clifford Thornton, and groups led by Elvin Jones.

Garrison also worked with Ornette Coleman during the 1960s, first recording with him in 1961 on Ornette on Tenor. He and Elvin Jones recorded with Coleman in 1968, and have been credited with eliciting more forceful playing than usual from Coleman on the albums New York Is Now! and Love Call.

In 1971 and 1972, Garrison taught as a Visiting Artist at Wesleyan University and Bennington College.

== Personal life ==
Garrison had four daughters and a son. With his first wife Robbie, he had three daughters: Robin, Lori, and Italy-based jazz vocalist Joy Garrison. With his second wife, dancer and choreographer Roberta Escamilla Garrison, he had Maia Claire and jazz bassist Matt Garrison.

Garrison died of lung cancer on April 7, 1976.

== Music and playing style ==
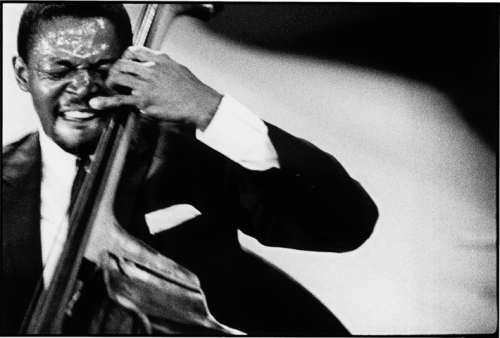
Garrison, in an undated photograph

Garrison was known for his inventive and melodic basslines, often using broken time and avoiding straight quarter notes as in a traditional walking bassline, to suggest the time and pulse rather than to outright play it. He was also known for his frequent use of double stops and for strumming the strings of the bass with his thumb. Garrison would often play unaccompanied improvised solos, sometimes as song introductions prior to the other musicians joining in, and occasionally used a bow. Garrison had a uniquely heavy and powerful gut-string tone.

== Discography ==
=== As leader ===
- 1963: Illumination! (Impulse!) with Elvin Jones

=== As sideman ===
With Lorez Alexandria
- For Swingers Only (Argo, 1963)

With Bill Barron

- The Tenor Stylings of Bill Barron (Savoy, 1961)

With Walter Bishop Jr.

- Speak Low (Jazztime, 1961)

With Benny Carter

- Further Definitions (Impulse!, 1961)

With Ornette Coleman

- Ornette on Tenor (Atlantic, 1961)
- New York Is Now! (Blue Note, 1968)
- Love Call (Blue Note, 1968)
- The Art of the Improvisers (Atlantic, 1970)

With Alice Coltrane

- A Monastic Trio (Impulse!, 1968)
- Cosmic Music (Impulse!, 1968)
- Universal Consciousness (Impulse!, 1971)
- Carnegie Hall '71 (Hi Hat, 2018)
- The Carnegie Hall Concert (Impulse!, 2024)

With John Coltrane

- Live at the Village Vanguard (Impulse!, 1961)
- Ballads (Impulse!, 1962)
- Coltrane (Impulse!, 1962)
- Duke Ellington & John Coltrane (Impulse!, 1962)
- John Coltrane and Johnny Hartman (Impulse!, 1963)
- Impressions (Impulse!, 1963)
- Live at Birdland (Impulse!, 1963)
- Crescent (Impulse!, 1964)
- A Love Supreme (Impulse!, 1964)
- Ascension (Impulse!, 1965)
- First Meditations (for quartet) (Impulse!, 1965)
- The John Coltrane Quartet Plays (Impulse!, 1965)
- Kulu Sé Mama (Impulse!, 1965)
- The New Wave in Jazz (Impulse!, 1965)
- Live at the Half Note: One Down, One Up (Impulse!, 1965 [2005])
- Live in Seattle (Impulse!, 1965)
- The Major Works of John Coltrane (GRP, 1965)
- Meditations (Impulse!, 1965)
- Transition (Impulse!, 1965)
- Sun Ship (Impulse!, 1965)
- Om (Impulse!, 1965)
- Live in Antibes (France's Concert, 1965)
- Live in Japan (Impulse!, 1966)
- Live at the Village Vanguard Again! (Impulse!, 1966)
- Expression (Impulse!, 1967)
- The Olatunji Concert: The Last Live Recording (Impulse!, 1967)
- Stellar Regions (Impulse!, 1967)
- Both Directions at Once: The Lost Album (Impulse!, 2018)
- Blue World (Impulse!, 2019)

With Ted Curson

- Plenty of Horn (Old Town, 1961)

With Nathan Davis

- Rules of Freedom (Polydor, 1969)

With Bill Dixon

- Intents and Purposes (RCA Victor, 1967)

With Kenny Dorham

- Jazz Contemporary (Time, 1960)
- Show Boat (Time, 1960)

With Curtis Fuller

- Blues-ette (Savoy, 1959)
- Imagination (Savoy, 1959)
- Images of Curtis Fuller (Savoy, 1960)
- The Magnificent Trombone of Curtis Fuller (Epic, 1961)

With Beaver Harris

- From Ragtime to No Time (360 Records, 1975)

With Elvin Jones

- Puttin' It Together (Blue Note, 1968)
- The Ultimate (Blue Note, 1968)

With Philly Joe Jones

- Blues for Dracula (Riverside, 1958)
- Drums Around the World (Riverside, 1959)
- Showcase (Riverside, 1959)

With Lee Konitz

- Live at the Half Note (Verve, 1959 [1994])

With Rolf Kühn and Joachim Kühn

- Impressions of New York (Impulse!, 1967)

With Cal Massey

- Blues to Coltrane (Candid, 1961 [1987])

With Jackie McLean

- Swing, Swang, Swingin' (Blue Note, 1959)

With J. R. Monterose

- Straight Ahead (Jaro, 1959) – also issued as The Message

With Robert Pozar

- Good Golly Miss Nancy (Savoy, 1967)

With Sonny Rollins

- East Broadway Run Down (Impulse!, 1966)

With Tony Scott

- Golden Moments (Muse, 1959 [1982])
- I'll Remember (Muse, 1959 [1984])

With Archie Shepp

- Life at the Donaueschingen Music Festival (SABA, 1967)
- Attica Blues (Impulse!, 1972)
- The Cry of My People (Impulse!, 1972)
- There's a Trumpet in My Soul (Freedom, 1975)

With Clifford Thornton

- Freedom & Unity (New World, 1967)

With McCoy Tyner

- Today and Tomorrow (Impulse!, 1963)
- McCoy Tyner Plays Ellington (Impulse!, 1964)
