= First Meditations (for quartet) =

Studio album by John Coltrane
- Released: December 1977
- Recorded: September 2, 1965
- Studios: Van Gelder Studio, Englewood Cliffs, New Jersey
- Genres: Avant-garde jazz, Free jazz, Modal jazz
- Length: 40:00 original LP; 52:16 CD reissue
- Labels: Impulse! AS-9332
- Producer: Bob Thiele

John Coltrane chronology
The Africa/Brass Sessions, Volume 2 (1974)	''First Meditations (for quartet)'' (1977)

First Meditations (for quartet) is an album by John Coltrane recorded on September 2, 1965, and posthumously released in 1977. It is a quartet version of a suite Coltrane would record as Meditations two months later with an expanded group. Along with Sun Ship, recorded a week earlier, First Meditations represents the final recordings of Coltrane's classic quartet featuring pianist McCoy Tyner, bassist Jimmy Garrison, and drummer Elvin Jones.

== Background ==
Coltrane's "classic" quartet had existed since April 1962, and by the time First Meditations was recorded, the group had achieved what Coltrane scholar David A. Wild called "near-telepathic communicative abilities," enabling them to flesh out Coltrane's musical ideas using minimal material. At the same time, thanks to Coltrane's apparent need to explore uncharted musical ground, the quartet was clearly straining at the boundaries of coherence, causing friction within the group. Both of these qualities are evident in the music heard on First Meditations.

== Music ==
The "Meditations" suite consists of five clearly-delineated movements. "Love," an out-of-tempo ballad that begins with a plaintive, swelling melody accompanied by washes of sound, is followed by "Compassion," a strongly rhythmic waltz. The third movement, "Joy," is an uplifting, up-tempo major-key piece; it is succeeded by "Consequences," which features a manic Tyner solo over polyrhythmic accompaniment provided by Garrison and Jones, leading to a climactic saxophone solo. The suite ends with "Serenity," a ballad.

As was true with Sun Ship, recorded on August 26, much of the music on First Meditations is based on small melodic cells that are used as starting points for improvisation. Throughout, Coltrane's playing is marked by extensive use of the extreme high register of the tenor saxophone, as well as by vocalized screams and cascades of notes. Much of the music's tension derives from a contrast between Coltrane's wildness and the rhythm section's insistence on providing a steady tonal and rhythmic framework. Wild noted that, in "Compassion," Coltrane's frantic vocalizations "become that much more penetrating when set off by the accompaniment: Jones continues relentlessly to repeat the rhythm pattern, Tyner to demarcate the tonality Coltrane has abandoned."

== Further developments ==
The day after the recording session, the group began a nine-day residence in Indianapolis, Indiana, after which they traveled to San Francisco for a two-week stay at the Jazz Workshop from September 14–26. During this period, saxophonist Pharoah Sanders, who had participated in the June 1965 recording of Ascension, and bassist and clarinetist Donald Garrett, who had known Coltrane since 1955, sat in with the band; according to Sanders, Coltrane told him "that he was thinking of changing the group and changing the music, to get different sounds." Sanders and Garrett were invited to travel with the group to Seattle, where they would record Live in Seattle, Om, and A Love Supreme: Live in Seattle as a sextet, supplemented by additional guest musicians. Sanders would remain with the group until the final year of Coltrane's life.

While in California, the quartet visited Coast Recorders, where, on September 22, they recorded another version of "Joy" which was included on the CD release of First Meditations as a bonus track. This track is the last known recording of the Coltrane/Tyner/Garrison/Jones quartet, as later recordings all involved other musicians. (Tyner would leave Coltrane's group at the end of 1965 to form his own trio and to work with Tony Scott, and Jones departed in January 1966, joining Duke Ellington's band.) The alternate version of "Joy" was initially issued in edited form on the 1972 album Infinity, with an overdubbed string orchestra plus harp and vibraphone parts provided by Alice Coltrane. The track would also appear, in unaltered form, on the 1978 album The Mastery of John Coltrane, Vol. 1: Feelin' Good.

At some point, Coltrane decided not to release the initial recording of the suite, and instead, in November 1965, elected to record a second version, featuring the quartet plus Sanders and drummer Rashied Ali. This version was released in 1966 as Meditations. Although this "definitive" rendering is also composed of five movements, it omits "Joy," and begins with a new piece titled "The Father and the Son and the Holy Ghost," which is then followed by "Compassion," "Love," "Consequences," and "Serenity," in that order. Given the presence of two drummers and an additional saxophonist, the music is, not surprisingly, much denser: David A. Wild wrote: "the movements become submerged in a swirling vortex of sound, and their themes appear casually, almost as if in passing." However, the fact that both versions of the suite are available in recorded form provides a valuable glimpse into Coltrane's evolution as a bandleader, composer, and saxophonist.

== Reception ==
Professional ratings
Review scores
Source	Rating
AllMusic	4/5 stars
DownBeat	5/5 stars
The Penguin Guide to Jazz	4/4 stars
The Rolling Stone Jazz Record Guide	4/5 stars

The authors of the Penguin Guide to Jazz Recordings awarded the album 4 stars, and stated that, when comparing the two versions of the "Meditations" suite, "on grounds of simple beauty and perhaps out of sentimental attachment to the group that was breaking up, the early version is to be preferred, though it clearly no longer represented what Coltrane wanted to do."

Bob Blumenthal, writing for The Rolling Stone Jazz Record Guide, commented: "Coltrane was pushing toward greater harmonic and rhythmic freedom, a move which Tyner and Jones made reluctantly. The music is harsher, more unsettled, with hints that agreement is occasionally lacking in the rhythm section."

Chris May, writing for All About Jazz, included the recording in his Coltrane "Alternative Top Ten Albums" list, and stated that, in comparison with Meditations, "if you prefer relatively gentler Coltrane, then First Meditations (For Quartet) is the one to go for."

== Track listing ==
All tracks composed by John Coltrane.

=== Side one ===
No.	Title	Length
1.	"Love"	8:03
2.	"Compassion"	9:32
Total length:		17:35

=== Side two ===
No.	Title	Length
1.	"Joy"	8:52
2.	"Consequences"	7:21
3.	"Serenity"	6:12
Total length:		22:25 40:00

=== CD bonus track ===
No.	Title	Length
6.	"Joy" (alternate version)	12:16
Total length:		52:16

== Personnel ==
- John Coltrane – tenor saxophone
- McCoy Tyner – piano
- Jimmy Garrison – double bass
- Elvin Jones – drums
