= Live in Seattle (John Coltrane album) =

Live album by John Coltrane
- Released: 1971
- Recorded: September 30, 1965
- Venues: The Penthouse, Seattle, Washington
- Genres: Free jazz, avant-garde jazz
- Length: 77:36 (original LP); 122:44 (CD reissue)
- Label: Impulse! Records
- Producer: John Coltrane

Professional ratings
Review scores
Source	Rating
Allmusic	3.5/5 stars
The Penguin Guide to Jazz	3.5/4 stars
Rolling Stone	4/5 stars

Live in Seattle is a live double album by jazz saxophonist John Coltrane, recorded in 1965 and released posthumously in 1971 on the Impulse! label. The album consists of a set played by Coltrane's quartet (augmented as a sextet with second saxophonist Pharoah Sanders and second bassist Donald Garrett) at The Penthouse on September 30, 1965. Along with the later-released A Love Supreme: Live in Seattle, recorded two days later at the same club, they are the only officially released live recordings of Coltrane's six-piece lineup from late 1965. The original double LP issue was expanded to 2 CDs for the reissue.

== Background ==
During September 14–26, 1965, the John Coltrane Quartet played an engagement at the Jazz Workshop in San Francisco. The saxophonist Pharoah Sanders, whose music Coltrane admired, and who had previously recorded with Coltrane on Ascension, went to hear the group and was invited to sit in. According to Sanders, "[H]e told me then that he was thinking of changing the group and changing the music, to get different sounds. He asked me to play with him." At the same time, the multi-instrumentalist Donald Garrett, who had played with Coltrane's group in 1961 as a second bassist, was also asked to sit in. At the end of the two-week gig, both Sanders and Garrett were asked to join the band, and accompanied it to the next engagement, September 27 - October 2, at The Penthouse in Seattle.

During the stay in Seattle, Coltrane decided to document the newly expanded group at his own expense, hiring the recording engineer Jan Kurtis for the September 30 gig. Roughly 3½ hours of music were recorded that evening and, roughly four years after Coltrane's death, four pieces, "Cosmos", "Out Of This World", "Evolution" and "Tapestry In Sound", were selected to appear on the original double LP, with "Out Of This World" and "Evolution" split over two sides. Two additional pieces, "Body and Soul" and an incomplete version of "Afro Blue", were added for the CD release, and the previously-split "Out Of This World" and "Evolution" were restored to create continuous versions. ("Afro Blue" features an alto saxophone solo by an unidentified player; it has been speculated that this may have been Carlos Ward or Joe Brazil.) Most of the remaining music recorded that evening was released on CD by Rare Live Recordings in 2011 on The Unissued Seattle Broadcast, which was created from a fan's recording of a radio broadcast, Jazz from the Penthouse on KING-FM, hosted by Jim Wilke. It contains four tracks: "Untitled Original", which ends with a bass duet that apparently precedes "Cosmos" from the original disc in terms of the actual running order; an incomplete continuation of the version of "Afro Blue" that appeared on the original CD; "Lush Life"; and an incomplete version of "My Favorite Things".

The following day, October 1, Coltrane's group, along with Joe Brazil, went to Jan Kurtis's studio, Camelot Sound Studios in Lynnwood, Washington, to record Om. On October 2, the group returned to The Penthouse and performed the music heard on the album A Love Supreme: Live in Seattle.

== Reception ==
In a 1965 Seattle Times review of the band's performance several nights before the recording, Ed Baker wrote: "Coltrane's sound is like nothing else. It is wild, furious, dissonant, scornful of conventional rules of harmonics, indifferent about melody. It also is the most influential sound in modern jazz. Many other instrumentalists, seeking new ways to express their musical ideas, have gathered around Coltrane to absorb his ideas—which, in essence, have freedom as their goal... The music is urgent, heavily percussive packed with tension that seldom allows release... Most laymen, even most musicians, perhaps, either will like Coltrane's music to the point of frenzy or will reject it with equal passion... Each listener brings deep-grooved habits with him when he hears the music. Coltrane's departures from harmonic tradition may cause discomfort—but the listener won't forget the sound. That sound may be Coltrane's artistic method of expressing some ideas about tensions and harshness in the world outside of jazz music. Some members of the audience will hear chaos only; others will find beauty emerging from an inferno. It's an experience—the most unusual experience that modern jazz has to offer."

The Allmusic review by Scott Yanow comments: "Coltrane experts know that 1965 was the year that his music became quite atonal and, with the addition of Sanders, often very violent. This music, therefore, is not for fans of Coltrane's earlier sheets of sound period or for those who prefer jazz as melodic background music... This is innovative and difficult music that makes today's young lions (not to mention the pop saxophonists) sound very old-fashioned in comparison".

In a Seattle Weekly article, David Stoesz wrote that the album is "such a relentlessly raw and abrasive document of late-period Coltrane that it can be a challenge to listen to the whole thing," and noted: "In a way, it also marks the beginning of the end for the classic Coltrane quartet, a band universally ranked as among the greatest jazz lineups of all time... Coltrane was now entering a realm so far out that his loyal comrades—with whom he'd recorded A Love Supreme, Crescent, and My Favorite Things—could no longer follow. What he was after was pure feeling, beyond notes, and certainly beyond anything so mundane as swinging and chords."

Kevin Courrier stated: "The enormity of that music was overwhelming for most listeners to consume. By Seattle, Coltrane had dispensed of conventional melodies in his own search for what Blind Willie Johnson had been looking for in the gospel blues: the soul of a man. For both artists, the soul of a man was not a harmonious place. So the octane that Coltrane provided was pure turbulence, a streaming of notes too primal to contain, what you might call a speaking in tongues from a spiritual hermitage." He concluded that the album "went beyond considerations of ever making money since the audience for that record could barely find a road map through its many detours – and those detours haven't been taken by anyone since. Whatever secrets John Coltrane discovered in that spiritual quest of playing those dramatic extended solos, he took them to the grave with him. And there ain't nobody who is ever going to bring them back."

Writing for Perfect Sound Forever, John Howard stated: "Righteous Maelstrom. Three horn blowouts, hooting, screaming, drums aflail BBOOM! Swirling, roiling ballads. This is the final death - throes of the classic quartet and the lines are clearly drawn, Coltrane and Sanders on one side (with an assist from Donald Garrett) and Tyner and Jones on the other. Jimmy Garrison mediates between the two factions providing lengthy bass solos that sound like sermons. It's everything the critics called it and more. Pompous, god bothering, formless, and chaotic, But it is also passionate and intelligent, the sound of 6 very advanced humans working to expand the human frame of reference. A Monster."

In July 1996, the band Sun City Girls presented a concert billed as "Sun City Girls play John Coltrane's Live in Seattle". The event, which took place at an Indian restaurant in Pioneer Square, Seattle at the same location where The Penthouse had stood more than thirty years prior, consisted entirely of the band playing a copy of the Live in Seattle record over the PA system.

== Track listing ==
=== Live in Seattle: original LP release ===
Side one
No.	Title	Length
1.	"Cosmos"	10:49
2.	"Out Of This World (Part One)"	8:44

Side two
No.	Title	Length
1.	"Out Of This World (Part Two)"	15:34

Side three
No.	Title	Length
1.	"Evolution (Part One)"	21:13

Side four
No.	Title	Length
1.	"Evolution (Part Two)"	15:09
2.	"Tapestry In Sound"	6:07

=== Live in Seattle: CD release ===
Disc one
No.	Title	Length
1.	"Cosmos"	10:49
2.	"Out Of This World"	24:20
3.	"Body and Soul"	21:03
4.	"Tapestry in Sound"	6:07

Disc two
No.	Title	Length
5.	"Evolution"	36:10
6.	"Afro Blue"	34:15

=== The Unissued Seattle Broadcast: CD release ===
Disc one
No.	Title	Length
1.	"Announcement"	0:38
2.	"Untitled Original"	29:55
3.	"Afro Blue"	18:32
4.	"Lush Life"	9:54
5.	"My Favorite Things"	10:09

- Recorded September 30, 1965, in Seattle.

== Personnel ==
- John Coltrane — tenor saxophone/soprano saxophone
- Pharoah Sanders — tenor saxophone
- McCoy Tyner — piano
- Jimmy Garrison — double bass
- Donald Garrett — clarinet (Note: The credits on the album jacket state that Garrett played bass clarinet on the recording. However, the authors of The John Coltrane Reference, who occasionally present updates to the book on their website, provided an update dated 2008 which states that the Dutch musician Cornelis Hazevoet sent the following information via an email to the author Yasuhiro Fujioka: "Over the years, in liners, books and lists, Don Garrett has been attributed with playing bass clarinet. This is wrong. The man only played bass and clarinet (the small and straight horn, that is)... In 1975, Garrett played in my band and I've specifically asked him about it (because I already felt something was wrong with it). He most specifically and pertinently told me that he never played bass clarinet in his entire life, only the small, straight horn (which he played in my band too)... Perhaps, the error originated from the fact that Garrett was listed somewhere as playing 'bass, clarinet', which subsequently evolved into 'bass clarinet'. Whatever is the case, Garrett did not play bass clarinet on any Coltrane record nor anywhere else.")/double bass
- Elvin Jones — drums
