= Sun Ship =

Studio album by John Coltrane
- Released: April 16, 1971
- Recorded: August 26, 1965
- Studios: RCA Victor, New York City
- Genre: Avant-garde jazz
- Length: 42:31 (Original LP); 107:29 (2013 Complete Session)
- Label: Impulse!
- Producers: Bob Thiele, John Coltrane

John Coltrane chronology
Transition (1970)	Sun Ship (1971)	Infinity (1972)

Sun Ship is a posthumously released free jazz album by tenor saxophonist John Coltrane recorded on August 26, 1965. Along with First Meditations, recorded a week later, it was one of the last recording dates for Coltrane's "Classic Quartet" with McCoy Tyner, Jimmy Garrison, and Elvin Jones. (Tyner left Coltrane's group at the end of 1965 to form his own trio and to work with Tony Scott, and Jones departed in January 1966, joining Duke Ellington's band.) The recording occurred shortly after a notable performance by the quartet, with Archie Shepp added as a second tenor player, at the DownBeat Jazz Festival at Soldier Field in Chicago, which was described by Ben Ratliff as "a famous breaking point — a Dylan-at-Newport, or a Rite of Spring," with music that he described as "jagged and vociferous... It aggravated a great part of the crowd, prompting, according to some witnesses, a large exodus."

== Overview ==
Sun Ship was one of the few albums John Coltrane's quartet recorded without sound engineer Rudy Van Gelder. According to David A. Wild's liner notes for the 1995 reissue of the album, "the reason is lost in time, but most probably Van Gelder was booked and Coltrane refused to wait."

Sun Ship: The Complete Session, a two-CD collection, was released in 2013. On this release, "Amen" is the only song identical to its master take; the four other songs appear in unedited form, plus alternative takes of all five tracks, false starts, breakdowns, incomplete takes, and inserts.

This was his second album to chart on the Billboard Top LPs, reaching No. 186 in 1971.

== Music ==
Sun Ship consists of five independent tracks, unlike many of Coltrane's other works from this period (e.g. Ascension, First Meditations, Om, Meditations) that are suites or single large works. Wild's liner notes state: "It's likely the five compositions were sketches rather than full arrangements - Coltrane usually relied on the near-telepathic communicative abilities of the group to flesh out his ideas. 'With John we could come in, he would give us two notes and we could play a whole composition on two notes,' Tyner recalled. 'Sometimes he wouldn't bring in a tune, he'd bring in a scale, and we'd play the scale and everything would be right there. We were familiar with each other, the musicianship was high.' That level of creativity is well documented here, in a set of performances which together act to showcase the abilities of each member of the quartet."

== Reception ==
Professional ratings
Review scores
Source	Rating
AllMusic	4/5 stars
The Penguin Guide to Jazz	4/4 stars
The Rolling Stone Jazz Record Guide	4/5 stars

In his AllMusic review, Thom Jurek wrote: "After nearly four years together, this band had achieved a vital collective identity. When Coltrane moved toward metrically free styles of rhythm and melody (with tunes often based on one chord or a short series of notes as themes), the quartet's rhythmic pulse and collective interplay evolved accordingly... While a summation for this quartet, Sun Ship is also an exciting if unfinished prelude to Coltrane's final period of transformation." Wild's 1995 liner notes describe Sun Ship as "a quintet of compositions, five multifaceted performances, four close-knit partners assembling to follow one member's restless explorations. A meeting of minds, a collaboration of master musicians, expanding, stretching, probing the furthest reaches, the ultimate possibilities of the time-tested 'tenor plus rhythm' format... Classic recordings by the Classic John Coltrane Quartet, an unforgettable, forever-fresh, essential part of the art of jazz." Edward Mendelowitz called Sun Ship "a riveting glimpse of a band traveling at warp speed, alternating shards of chaos and beauty, the white heat of virtuoso musicians in the final moments of an almost preternatural communion, ecstasy and feat."

In a review of Sun Ship: The Complete Session, Richard Brody wrote: "this album... highlights Coltrane’s tense and increasingly conflict-torn contention with his own musical heritage, style, and material," and described Coltrane's fast playing as "a vortex of obsessively involuted streaks of chordal fragments that yield to furious, sound-shredded shrieks and bellows that suggest the will to break through the stuff of harmonic investigation to sheer expressive sound, the swinging patterns of pounding rhythm to shifting biocentric undulations. It's radical enough, ecstatically musical, and imbued with the spirit of the new thing." Regarding some of the slower passages, Brody wrote: "I've always thought of Coltrane as an essentially religious artist whose seraphic spirituality seemed clear and bright (though often earthy and rugged). His adoption of a wide and slow, Ayler-ish vibrato (as well as a more strident tone) made him sound as if he were playing in tongues, as if his light had gone from bright to blinding, as if his purity ran the risk of reckless, self-escaping loss of control — as if he went from conveying the divine spirit to being possessed by it." In concluding, Brody stated that Coltrane's "later recordings... reveal Coltrane as he had, so to speak, passed through to the other side. In the Sun Ship session, he is still breaking through; it's a key moment of transition, of personal as well as musical transformation. The album Sun Ship captures that vast musical and moral change; the complete session documents it in action, like a sonic documentary film. It's a treasure, a joy, and a revelation."

== Track listing ==
No.	Title	Length
1.	"Sun Ship"	6:12
2.	"Dearly Beloved"	6:27
3.	"Amen"	8:16
4.	"Attaining"	11:26
5.	"Ascent"	10:10
Total length:		42:31

=== Sun Ship: The Complete Session (2013) ===
Disc 1
No.	Title	Length
1.	"Dearly Beloved" (Takes 1 & 2, False Start and Alternate Version)	6:36
2.	"Dearly Beloved" (Take 3, Breakdown)	1:24
3.	"Dearly Beloved" (Take 4, Complete Version)	6:17
4.	"Attaining" (Take 1, Alternate Version)	13:38
5.	"Attaining" (Take 2, Breakdown)	1:02
6.	"Attaining" (Take 3, Complete Version)	10:27
7.	"Attaining" (Take 4, Insert 1)	4:41
8.	"Sun Ship" (Take 1, Breakdown)	0:58
9.	"Sun Ship" (Take 2, Complete Alternate Version)	6:32
10.	"Sun Ship" (Take 3, Insert 1)	2:32
11.	"Sun Ship" (Take 4, Complete Version)	6:33
Total length:		60:40

Disc 2
No.	Title	Length
1.	"Studio conversation"	0:43
2.	"Ascent" (Take 1, Complete Version)	11:36
3.	"Ascent" (Take 2, Incomplete Version)	4:49
4.	"Ascent" (Take 3, False Starts And Incomplete Version)	3:51
5.	"Ascent" (Takes 4 - 6, Inserts / False Starts)	1:39
6.	"Ascent" (Take 7, Complete Insert 4)	4:03
7.	"Ascent" (Take 8, Complete Insert 5)	4:05
8.	"Amen" (Take 1, Alternate Version)	7:46
9.	"Amen" (Take 2, Released Version)	8:17
Total length:		46:49 107:29

Original album sequence and choices

- "Sun Ship": Take 4, with Elvin Jones's drum coda edit out.
- "Dearly Beloved": Take 4, with the discussion from Take 1 added as an introduction.
- "Amen": Take 2, unedited.
- "Attaining": The first 7:24 of Take 3, followed by the last 3:58 of Insert 1.
- "Ascent": Take 1, with about 1:30 of the bass solo edited out.

== Personnel ==
Musicians

- John Coltrane – tenor saxophone, leader (note that while the cover photo shows Coltrane playing soprano saxophone, he only plays tenor on this date)
- McCoy Tyner – piano
- Jimmy Garrison – bass
- Elvin Jones – drums

Technical

- Bob Simpson – engineer
- Alice Coltrane – prepared original release
- Ed Michel – prepared original release
- Michael Cuscuna – 1995 reissue producer, The Complete Session supervisor
- Harry Weinger – The Complete Session supervisor
- Richard Seidel – The Complete Session supervisor

== Charts ==
Chart (1971)	Peak position
US Billboard Top LPs	186
