= A Love Supreme =

Studio album by John Coltrane
- Released: January 1965
- Recorded: December 9, 1964
- Studio: Van Gelder (Englewood Cliffs)
- Genres: Modal jazz; post-bop; spiritual jazz
- Length: 32:47
- Label: Impulse!
- Producer: Bob Thiele

John Coltrane chronology
| Crescent (1964) | A Love Supreme (1965) | The John Coltrane Quartet Plays (1965) |

A Love Supreme is an album by the American jazz saxophonist and composer John Coltrane. It was recorded in one session on December 9, 1964, at Van Gelder Studio in Englewood Cliffs, New Jersey, with a quartet featuring pianist McCoy Tyner, bassist Jimmy Garrison, and drummer Elvin Jones.

A Love Supreme was released by Impulse! Records in January 1965. Referred to as the saxophonist's "definitive tone poem", it ranks among Coltrane's best-selling albums and is widely considered one of the greatest masterpieces in the history of jazz and one of the greatest albums ever made. It was nominated for the 1966 Grammy Award for Best Jazz Instrumental Album.

== Composition ==
A Love Supreme is a through-composed suite in four parts: "Acknowledgement" (which includes the oral chant that gives the album its name), "Resolution", "Pursuance", and "Psalm". Coltrane plays tenor saxophone on all parts. One critic has written that the album was intended to represent a struggle for purity, an expression of gratitude, and an acknowledgement that the musician's talent comes from a higher power. The album's improvisational and spiritual intensity has led some to liken it to glossolalia, or speaking in tongues, as it conveys a profound sense of ecstatic devotion. This sacred quality has led it to become the "central text" of the Saint John Coltrane African Orthodox Church in San Francisco. Coltrane's home in Dix Hills, Long Island, may have inspired the album. Another influence may have been Ahmadiyya Islam.

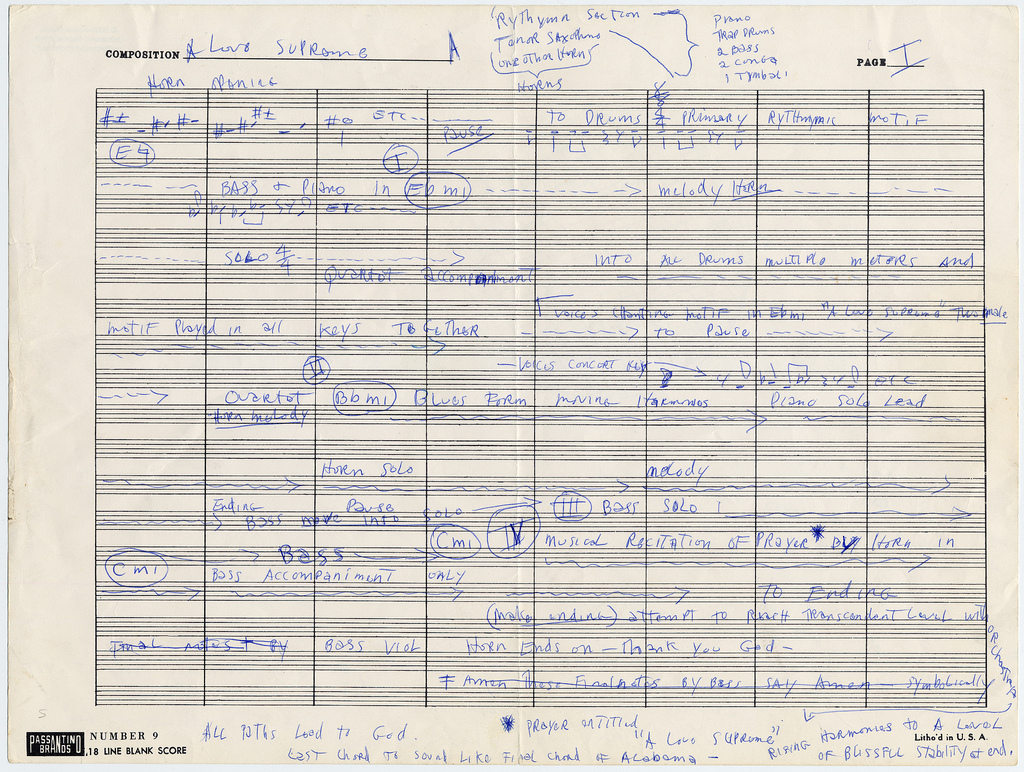
Coltrane's handwritten notes for A Love Supreme

According to assistant music editor at Time Out John Lewis, the album "pulls off the rare trick of being utterly uncompromising yet completely accessible."

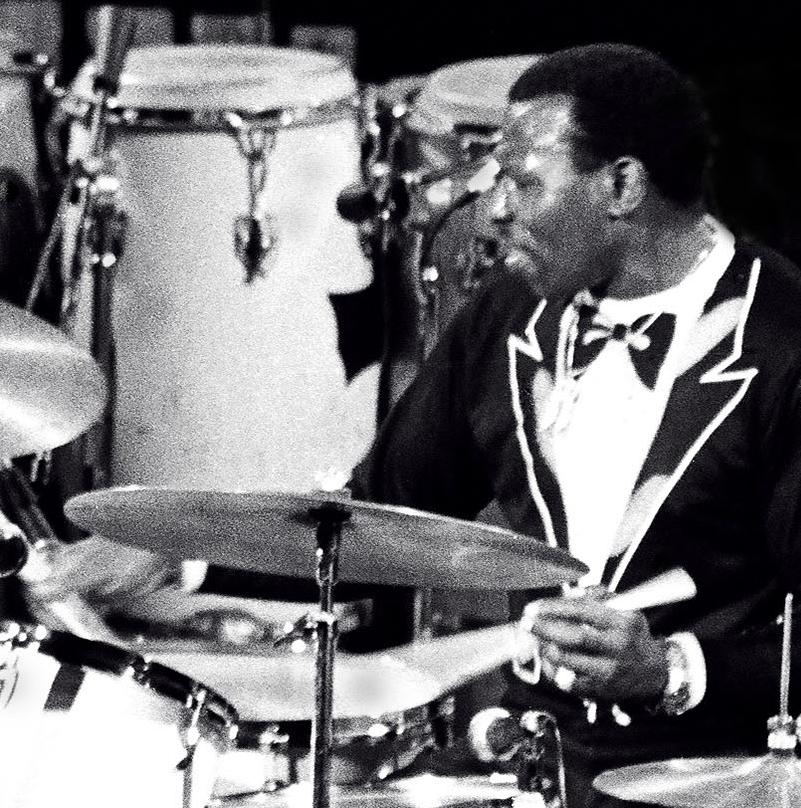
Elvin Jones (pictured in 1976)

The album begins with the bang of a gong (tam-tam) and cymbal washes on the first track, "Acknowledgement". Jimmy Garrison enters on double bass with the four-note motif that lays the foundation of the movement. Coltrane begins a solo. He plays variations on the motif until he repeats the four notes thirty-six times. The motif then becomes the vocal chant "a love supreme", sung by Coltrane accompanying himself through overdubs nineteen times. According to Rolling Stone, this movement's four-note theme is "the humble foundation of the suite".

"Part 1: Acknowledgement"
The first 30 seconds of "Part 1: Acknowledgement", the first track on A Love Supreme

In the fourth and final movement, "Psalm", Coltrane performs what he calls a "musical narration". Lewis Porter calls it a "wordless recitation". The devotional is included in the liner notes. Coltrane "plays" the words of the poem on saxophone but doesn't speak them. Some scholars have suggested that this performance is an homage to the sermons of African-American preachers. The poem (and, in his own way, Coltrane's solo) ends with the cry, "Elation. Elegance. Exaltation. All from God. Thank you God. Amen."

A Love Supreme was categorized by Rockdelux as modal jazz, avant-garde jazz, free jazz, hard bop, and post-bop.

== Other performances ==
Two alternative versions of "Acknowledgement" were recorded the next day, on December 10, with tenor saxophonist Archie Shepp and a second bassist, Art Davis. These versions omit Coltrane chanting "a love supreme"; he preferred the quartet version with the chant, placing that on the issued album. There are two known live recordings of the "Love Supreme" suite. For years the only known live recording of the "Love Supreme" suite was of a performance at the Festival Mondial du Jazz Antibes in Juan-les-Pins, France, on July 26, 1965. On October 29, 2002, the album was reissued as a remastered deluxe edition by Impulse! Records with this live performance and the alternate takes on a bonus disc. A further iteration with more studio breakdowns and overdubs was issued as a three-disc complete masters edition released by Impulse! on November 20, 2015. The other known live recording of the suite was recorded October 2, 1965, at The Penthouse in Seattle. The set was recorded by saxophonist Joe Brazil. This live performance was released on October 22, 2021, by Impulse! as A Love Supreme: Live in Seattle.

== Reception and legacy ==
Contemporary professional ratings
Review scores
| Source | Rating |
|---|---|
| DownBeat | 5/5 stars |
| Record Mirror | 3/5 stars |

Released in January 1965 by Impulse! Records, A Love Supreme became one of the most acclaimed jazz records, and contemporary critics hailed it as one of the important albums of post-war jazz. By 1970, it had sold about 500,000 copies, far exceeding Coltrane's usual sales of 30,000, although it never charted on the Billboard 200. It has since been regarded as Coltrane's masterpiece and is "without question Coltrane's most beloved album", according to Robert Christgau, who adds that it "cemented 'Trane's divine status in Japan".

Retrospective professional ratings
Review scores
| Source | Rating |
|---|---|
| All About Jazz | 5/5 stars |
| AllMusic | 5/5 stars |
| And It Don't Stop | A− |
| Encyclopedia of Popular Music | 5/5 stars |
| MusicHound Jazz | 5/5 |
| The Penguin Guide to Jazz Recordings | 4/4 stars |
| Pitchfork | 10/10 |
| Q | 5/5 stars |
| The Rolling Stone Album Guide | 5/5 stars |
| Tom Hull – on the Web | A+ |

A Love Supreme was widely recognized as a work of deep spirituality and analyzed with religious subtext, although cultural studies scholars Richard W. Santana and Gregory Erickson argued that the "avant-garde jazz suite" could be interpreted otherwise. According to music professor Ingrid Monson of Harvard University, the album was an exemplary recording of modal jazz. Nick Dedina wrote on the Rhapsody website that the music ranged from free jazz and hard bop to sui generis gospel music in "an epic aural poem to man's place in God's plan". Calling it a "legendary album-long hymn of praise", Rolling Stone said that "Coltrane's majestic, often violent blowing (famously described as 'sheets of sound') is never self-aggrandizing" and that he is "aloft with his classic quartet", "soar[ing] with nothing but gratitude and joy" on a compelling journey for listeners. The Rolling Stone Jazz Record Guide (1985) said that "each man performs with eloquence and economy", while calling the album "the masterpiece from the quartet's studio work", "the first comprehensive statement of Coltrane's spiritual concerns", and "the cornerstone of many Coltrane collections". On the other hand, jazz critic Tom Hull said that he has not much considered the album "spiritual" but rather "the most perfectly plotted single piece of jazz ever recorded".

A Love Supreme has appeared on professional listings of the greatest albums. In 2003, it was ranked number 47 on Rolling Stone's list of the 500 greatest albums of all time; maintaining the rating in a 2012 revised list, it was re-ranked at number 66 in a 2020 reboot of the list. NME ranked it number 188 on a similar list in 2013. It was included in Robert Dimery's 1001 Albums You Must Hear Before You Die. It was voted number 85 in the third edition of Colin Larkin's All Time Top 1000 Albums (2000).

According to Joachim-Ernst Berendt, the album's hymn-like quality permeated modern jazz and rock music. As Christgau explains, the record was "adored by American hippies from the Byrds and Carlos Santana on down, and served as theme music to Lester Bangs's wake at CBGB".

In The Penguin Guide to Jazz, Richard Cook and Brian Morton gave A Love Supreme a rare "crown" rating but asked whether it was "the greatest jazz album of the modern period... or the most overrated?" Miles Davis, Coltrane's former bandleader, said the record "reached out and influenced those people who were into peace. Hippies and people like that". Christgau, writing in 2020, said, "it's meditative rather than freewheeling, with each member of his classic quartet instructed to embark on his own harmonically mapped excursion and the title set to a chanted four-note melody you could hum in your sleep. I'm on my fourth consecutive play with no signs of tune fatigue as I write, plus my wife loves it. All true, all remarkable. But how much you value it, I expect, depends on how much faith you place in your own spirituality." He concluded that the next time he will listen to the album "may well depend on who dies when".

In June 2026, CBS News included A Love Supreme, Pt. I – Acknowledgement in its list of the 250 essential American songs of the past 250 years.

== Legacy ==
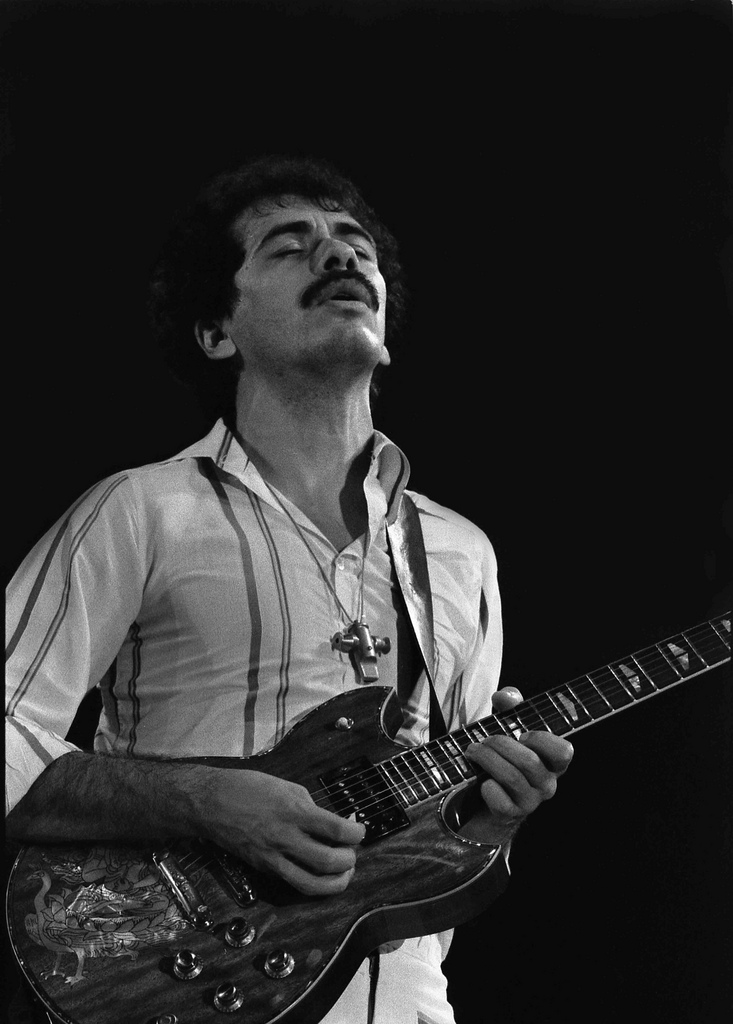
Carlos Santana (1978), one of many rock musicians to have been deeply influenced by the album

Musicians such as Joshua Redman and U2, who mention the album in their song "Angel of Harlem", have mentioned the influence of the album on their own work. Guitarists Carlos Santana and John McLaughlin called the album one of their biggest early influences, and they teamed up to record Love Devotion Surrender in 1973 as a tribute. "Every so often this ceases to be a jazz record and is more avant-garde contemporary classical", said Neil Hannon of the band the Divine Comedy. "I love the combination of abstract piano that's all sort of 'clang', and weird chords with wailing saxophone over the top."

The American singer Will Downing's debut single, "A Love Supreme", (1988) was inspired by the vocal section at the end of "A Love Supreme, Pt. I - Acknowledgement". The single reached number 4 on the US Dance chart, number 77 on the US R&B chart, and number 14 in the UK.

The manuscript for the album was included in the National Museum of American History's "Treasures of American History" collection at the Smithsonian Institution. In 2015, the album was selected for preservation in the National Recording Registry due to its "cultural, historic, or artistic significance." It is Coltrane's second album to be included after Giant Steps in 2005.

== Track listing ==
All tracks are composed by John Coltrane and published by Jowcol Music (BMI).

=== Original LP ===
Side one

| No. | Recorded | Take number | Title | Length |
|---|---|---|---|---|
| 1. | December 9, 1964 | 90243 | Part 1: "Acknowledgement" | 7:47 |
| 2. | December 9, 1964 | 90244‒7 | Part 2: "Resolution" | 7:22 |

Side two

| No. | Recorded | Take number | Title | Length |
|---|---|---|---|---|
| 1. | December 9, 1964 | 90245‒1 | Part 3: "Pursuance"/Part 4: "Psalm" | 17:53 |

=== 2002 deluxe edition ===
Disc one

| No. | Recorded | Take number | Title | Length |
|---|---|---|---|---|
| 1. | December 9, 1964 | 90243 | Part 1: "Acknowledgement" | 7:43 |
| 2. | December 9, 1964 | 90244‒7 | Part 2: "Resolution" | 7:20 |
| 3. | December 9, 1964 | 90245‒1 | Part 3: "Pursuance" | 10:42 |
| 4. | December 9, 1964 | 90245‒1 | Part 4: "Psalm" | 7:05 |

Disc two

| No. | Recorded | Take number | Title | Length |
|---|---|---|---|---|
| 1. | July 26, 1965 | n/a | Introduction by André Francis | 1:13 |
| 2. | July 26, 1965 | n/a | "Acknowledgement" (Live) | 6:11 |
| 3. | July 26, 1965 | n/a | "Resolution" (Live) | 11:36 |
| 4. | July 26, 1965 | n/a | "Pursuance" (Live) | 21:30 |
| 5. | July 26, 1965 | n/a | "Psalm" (Live) | 8:49 |
| 6. | December 9, 1964 | 90244‒4 | "Resolution" (Alternate take) | 7:25 |
| 7. | December 9, 1964 | 90244‒6 | "Resolution" (Breakdown) | 2:13 |
| 8. | December 10, 1964 | 90246‒1 | "Acknowledgement" (Alternate take) | 9:09 |
| 9. | December 10, 1964 | 90246‒2 | "Acknowledgement" (Alternate take) | 9:22 |

=== The Complete Masters (2015) ===
Disc 1 – The Original Stereo Album, Impulse! AS-77
| No. | Title | Length |
|---|---|---|
| 1. | "Acknowledgement" | 7:42 |
| 2. | "Resolution" | 7:20 |
| 3. | "Pursuance" | 10:41 |
| 4. | "Psalm" | 7:05 |

Original Mono Reference Masters
| No. | Title | Length |
|---|---|---|
| 1. | "Pursuance" | 10:42 |
| 2. | "Psalm" | 7:02 |

Disc 2 – Quartet Session, December 9, 1964
| No. | Title | Length |
|---|---|---|
| 1. | "Acknowledgement" (Vocal overdub 2) | 2:00 |
| 2. | "Acknowledgement" (Vocal overdub 3) | 2:05 |
| 3. | "Resolution" (Take 4 / alternate) | 7:25 |
| 4. | "Resolution" (Take 6 / breakdown) | 2:13 |
| 5. | "Psalm" (Undubbed version) | 6:59 |

Sextet Session, December 10, 1964
| No. | Title | Length |
|---|---|---|
| 1. | "Acknowledgement" (Take 1 / alternate) | 9:24 |
| 2. | "Acknowledgement" (Take 2 / alternate) | 9:47 |
| 3. | "Acknowledgement" (Take 3 / breakdown with studio dialogue) | 1:26 |
| 4. | "Acknowledgement" (Take 4 / alternate) | 9:04 |
| 5. | "Acknowledgement" (Take 5 / false start) | 0:34 |
| 6. | "Acknowledgement" (Take 6 / alternate) | 12:33 |

Disc 3 – Live at Festival Mondial du Jazz Antibes, July 26, 1965
| No. | Title | Length |
|---|---|---|
| 1. | "Introduction by André Francis and John Coltrane" | 1:13 |
| 2. | "Acknowledgement (Live)" | 6:12 |
| 3. | "Resolution (Live)" | 11:37 |
| 4. | "Pursuance (Live)" | 21:30 |
| 5. | "Psalm (Live)" | 8:49 |

- Disc 3 is included only with the "Super Deluxe Edition" version of this release.

== Personnel ==
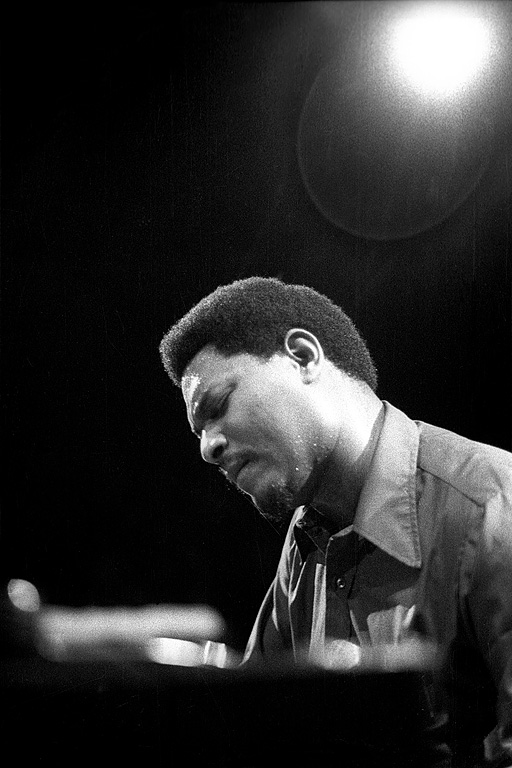
McCoy Tyner played piano throughout both sessions for A Love Supreme

=== The John Coltrane Quartet ===
- John Coltrane – bandleader, liner notes, vocals, tenor saxophone
- McCoy Tyner – piano
- Jimmy Garrison – double bass
- Elvin Jones – drums, gong, timpani

=== Additional personnel ===
- Archie Shepp – tenor saxophone on alternate takes of "Acknowledgement"
- Art Davis – double bass on alternate takes of "Acknowledgement"
- Rudy Van Gelder – engineering and mastering
- Bob Thiele – production and cover photo
- George Gray / Viceroy – cover design
- Victor Kalin – gatefold illustration
- Joe Lebow – liner design

=== Reissues ===
- Erick Labson – digital remastering (CD reissue)
- Kevin Reeves – mastering (SACD)
- Michael Cuscuna – liner notes, production, and remastering (deluxe edition)
- Joe Alper – photography (CD reissue)
- Jason Claiborne – graphics (CD reissue)
- Hollis King – art direction (CD reissue)
- Lee Tanner – photography (CD reissue)
- Ken Druker – production (deluxe edition)
- Esmond Edwards – photography (deluxe edition)
- Ashley Kahn – liner notes and production (deluxe edition)
- Peter Keepnews – notes editing (deluxe edition)
- Hollis King – art direction (deluxe edition)
- Bryan Koniarz – production (deluxe edition)
- Edward O'Dowd – design (deluxe edition)
- Mark Smith – production assistance (deluxe edition)
- Sherniece Smith – art coordination and production (deluxe edition)
- Chuck Stewart – photography (deluxe edition)
- Bill Levenson – reissue supervisor (SACD)
- Cameron Mizell – production coordination (SACD)
- Ron Warwell – design (SACD)
- Isabelle Wong – package design (SACD)

== Charts ==
Chart performance for A Love Supreme
| Chart (1998–2021) | Peak position |
|---|---|
| Dutch Albums (Album Top 100) | 88 |
| UK Jazz & Blues Albums (Official Charts) | 2 |
| UK Record Store Albums (OCC) | 35 |
| US Top Album Sales (Billboard) | 39 |
| US Top Jazz Albums (Billboard) | 6 |
| US Top Jazz Albums (Billboard) Deluxe edition | 10 |
| US Top Traditional Jazz Albums (Billboard) | 3 |
| US Top Traditional Jazz Albums (Billboard) Deluxe edition | 4 |

== Certifications ==
Sales certifications for A Love Supreme
| Region | Certification | Certified units/sales |
|---|---|---|
| Italy (FIMI) | Gold | 25,000^{*} |
| United Kingdom (BPI) | Gold | 100,000^{‡} |
| United States (RIAA) | Platinum | 1,000,000^{‡} |
^{*} Sales figures based on certification alone.^{‡} Sales+streaming figures based on certification alone.

== See also ==
- 1965 in jazz
- "Angel of Harlem", a 1989 U2 song referencing the album
- A Love Surreal, an album by Bilal
- Blue World, an album recorded between Crescent and A Love Supreme released in 2019
- Concept album
- Love of God

== Bibliography ==
- Kahn, Ashley (2003). A Love Supreme: The Story of John Coltrane's Signature Album. Elvin Jones. Penguin Books. ISBN 0-14-200352-2.
- Porter, Lewis (1999). John Coltrane: His Life and Music. University of Michigan Press. ISBN 0-472-08643-X.
- Porter, Lewis (1985). "John Coltrane's A Love Supreme: Jazz Improvisation as Composition" (PDF). Journal of the American Musicological Society. 38 (3). University of California Press: 593–621. doi:10.1525/jams.1985.38.3.03a00060.
