= Mat Walerian =

- Genres: Avant-garde jazz Free improvisation Post bop Oriental music Electronica
- Occupations: Bandleader, Saxophonist, Bass clarinetist, Composer
- Instruments: Alto saxophone, Bass clarinet, Soprano clarinet, Contrabass clarinet, Flute
- Years active: Since 2005
- Label: ESP-Disk
- Website: Official Website

Mat Walerian is a jazz saxophonist and woodwind player (alto saxophone, bass clarinet, soprano clarinet, contrabass clarinet, flute), composer and bandleader who specializes in improvisation and avant-garde music.

== Early life ==
Walerian began playing music at the age of six, starting with piano lessons. Hearing John Coltrane at the age of ten led him to jazz. From the very beginning he was interested in blues harmony, spending time playing blues and boogie miniatures.

While in high school he picked up the saxophone at the age of sixteen and in less than a month was playing in the school’s orchestra. He started with alto and after a year also tried tenor. After transferring to a new high school a couple months later, he lost the right to use the instruments and as a result got about a two-year break in practice, since his new school didn’t run an orchestra. He managed to buy his own instrument at the age of nineteen and came back to practice. In 2008 Walerian started individual studies on classical Japanese music, picking up soprano clarinet and flute. One year later (2009) he added also bass clarinet to his repertoire. Since 2023, he has also been working on an alternative use of the contrabass clarinet in improvised music, study also dictated by the specificity of the duo with double bassist William Parker and another performance at New York's Vision festival.

At the age of nineteen he tried formal musical education and after passing his exams became a student at a public music school, but he quit two months later. He was strongly attracted to jazz, but also played in crossover groups, melding hardcore and heavy experimental guitar music with free improvisation while in high school. His first project was a saxophone/drums duo with a characteristic avant psychedelic / funk groove.

== Career ==
His studies were mostly focused on eastern philosophy and Japanese culture. With the exception of a few lessons he is self – taught musician, occasionally taking lessons from pianist Matthew Shipp, lessons which he has cited as being crucial to his development.

In January 2015, Walerian signed with ESP-Disk' - legendary New York, Brooklyn based label, one of the most important independent record labels in the history of avant-garde jazz, founded in 1963, which catalogue includes some of the most important music recorded in America in the 1960s. For over 50 years of tradition ESP happened to be home for such notable artists, like Albert Ayler, Pharoah Sanders, or Sun Ra among others.

Albums he released as a leader received rave reviews within definitive sources in the music business, including The New York Times, Downbeat Music Magazine, All About Jazz, JAZZIZ Magazine, JazzTimes, AllMusic, The New York City Jazz Record, The Wire, JazzWise Magazine London, Aftenposten Norway, Jazz Magazine France, Los Angeles Jazz Scene, or Something Else Reviews among others. New York sources, like Culture Catch, Gapplegate Music Review, Jazz Right Now, or Downtown Music Gallery, as well as Israel based The Soundtrack Of My Life, being one of the most notable voices worldwide, praised his consecutive releases.

Walerian's trio was also recommended by highly acclaimed writer Doug Ramsey, Downbeat and Jazz Times magazines lifelong writer and recipient of two ASCAP Deems Taylor Awards and the lifetime achievement award of the US Jazz Journalists Association, who is the author of several jazz history books, including The Jazz Matters. In his recommendation the author says that "a piece called “One For” suggests intimate familiarity with the chance-taking of John Coltrane’s later groups."

Reference work containing an encyclopedic directory of Polish jazz recordings, Polish Jazz Recordings and Beyond, calls Walerian "one of the most talented young jazz musicians on the Polish scene, if not the most talented", emphasizing that "his understanding and synergy with the other members of the trio, his expression and dynamism, richness of sound, technique combined with sensitivity are unbelievable and out of this world."

Released albums were repeatedly chosen as ’Editor's Pick’ after premiere, annually ending on 'Best of the Year' album list by varied sources. Two biggest names in audiophile world, being The Absolute Sound, and Stereophile New York, awarded the albums with highest notes.

Walerian's music made it to #1 position both on US and Canada Jazz Charts, with albums being presented by a large number of radio stations worldwide, including New York, Los Angeles, Washington D.C, Chicago, New Orleans, St.Louis, Santa Monica, Seattle, Denver, or Nebraska in the US ; Toronto, Montreal, or Vancouver in Canada ; London UK, and Polish National Public Radio.

His style is firmly in the mainstream of modern jazz and improvised music, somewhere around hard free bop with a tribute to the atonal avant-garde heritage. Classical music, jazz classics and the classical music of Japan and India have all left a distinct impression on his creation. Walerian cooperates in diverse musical projects with musician who represent various musical streams; jazz, classical, contemporary, improvised avant-garde music and electronica.

His musical projects include The Uppercut (duo with Matthew Shipp), Toxic (trio with Matthew Shipp and William Parker), Jungle (trio with Matthew Shipp and Hamid Drake), Okuden, Dark Matter (trio with Michael Bisio and Mat Maneri), Sainthunter, Mutant Definition, or Blackadmin. In his projects Walerian mixes classical chamber music, jazz classics and Asian scales along with the modern expression of improvised music. As side person together with bassist Michael Bisio and drummer Whit Dickey he represents Matthew Shipp Sonic Fiction Quartet; also being a part of pianist's sextet - Matthew Shipp Acoustic Ensemble Inward Motion project.

From 2005 through 2008 he concentrated on projects characterized by heavy echoes of third stream and chamber music qualities melded along with Asian harmony and instruments. In this period he released many trio projects including various bowed string instruments (saxophone/harp/cello, saxophone/harp/viola, saxophone/harp/violin, saxophone/harp/double bass, saxophone/piano/violin, etc.) presenting minimal music stylistics.

His first classic jazz trio (saxophone with rhythm section) appeared in 2010. After that his work got wilder performance, characterized by compound structures and rhythm.

Walerian when asked for describing life in his own words said: "I love nature and experiencing wildlife phenomena"

== Partnerships ==
Walerian's most notable collaborators are pianist Matthew Shipp, bassist William Parker and drummer/percussionist Hamid Drake, with whom he has released around ten different projects.

He first met Hamid Drake in 2008; since then they have collaborated on a number of projects, including the powerful trio Sainthunter (with bassist Tim Dahl) and other projects implementing experiments with Asian and contemporary chamber music.

"The group continues strongly with "Just Drop It In New Orleans", with clear blues and traditional jazz inspirations. Walerian starts on B♭ clarinet and evoking the tradition of the best genuine clarinetists - from Benny Goodman, through Jimmy Giuffre to Europeans : Louis Sclavis, Michel Portal. (...) The Force, Energy and Synergy are again there, and are just breathtaking."

Pianist Matthew Shipp appeared as a special guest with Walerian's trio in September 2011.

"... Mat and Matt are simply outstanding ... Fantastic music, worth getting and listening to it for any price !"

After a quartet collaboration as well, Shipp proposed the duo project M-theory, introduced during May 2012 concert tour. The name of the project was changed to The Uppercut : Matthew Shipp Mat Walerian duo during December 2013 concert tour, and a concert recording of the duo, Live at Okuden, has been released by New York City, Brooklyn based record label ESP-Disk' in April 2015.

"Mat and Matt form an artistic unity of unprecedented intensity. This is evidently one of the best Polish jazz recordings of the last 20 years... To some the music reminds a little the late experiments of Jimmy Giuffre and Paul Bley - it is, however, clearly contemporary (…) whatever the associations are, however, the over 15 minutes long suite is clearly a masterpiece. (...) "Free Bob Statement 1 and 2", that illustrate amazing chemical bonds between the two musicians and their mutual understanding and unity... It is not only virtuoso piece in the technical sense - it is also explosion of emotions and feelings... As a whole, this set is a true masterpiece and super important recording not only for Polish jazz!!!"

Later in 2012 Walerian and Matthew Shipp trio (Matthew Shipp - piano, Michael Bisio - double bass, Whit Dickey - drums) appeared as a quartet at the Okuden Music Concert Series Fall 2012. Sonic Fiction, studio recording of the quartet has been released by New York City, Brooklyn based record label ESP-Disk' in February 2018.

"Matt and Mat are back in the fall of 2012 with the phenomenal American section of Bisio and Dickey, under the flag of Matt's Quartet ... In terms of alto playing, it is one of the most radical, contemporary and important Polish jazz recordings.

A large number of lineups with both Shipp and Drake followed, including a trio which turned out to be the second most important point in Walerian's career after The uppercut. The world premiere of this Walerian-Shipp-Drake "supergroup" project, Jungle took place in November 2012. Concert recording of the trio, Live at Okuden has been released by New York City, Brooklyn based record label ESP-Disk' in April 2016.

"One hour and forty minutes of pure delight... Jungle is incomparable to anything else... it is an artistic achievement of the highest possible standard... such a recording of one or one and a half hour long concert, that is a continuous and uniform flow of beauty, intensity and expression is not a frequent thing in the jazz history. (...) It is hard to talk about the culmination of this recordings - they provide an never ending culmination indeed.""

"The examples that come to my mind, and this is not an exaggeration in any sense, are : John Coltrane's "The Complete 1961 Village Vanguard Recordings", or Miles Davis' "The Complete Live at the Plugged Nickel 1965". If we ignore the beauty aspect, and focus on the strength of expression only the appropriate association is to John Coltrane's "Live at Seattle" with John Coltrane on soprano and tenor, Pharoah Sanders on tenor McCoy Tyner on piano, Jimmy Garrison on bass, Elvin Jones on drums and Donald Garrett on bass clarinet and bass."

"Jungle is obviously a joint project … it is a project whose name explains the meaning of the music : the joint point of view and the largest inspiration of the members of the trio, that is unconditional and absolute love of nature. The music is thought to show impression of wildlife, animals, fauna, flora, all of the natural phenomena. It is a very organic project, in the very biological meaning of this word. Mother Nature, Mother Earth. Already in this description one can feel the spirit of John Coltrane, and indeed the music belongs clearly to the post-Coltrane tradition."

== Discography ==
=== As leader/co-leader ===
Recorded	Release year	Title	Label	Catalog	Band/Personnel
2012 May	2015 April	Live at Okuden	ESP-Disk'	ESP 5007	THE UPPERCUT Matthew Shipp Mat Walerian - duo with Matthew Shipp (piano)
2012 November	2016 April	Live at Okuden	ESP-Disk'	ESP 5009	JUNGLE Mat Walerian Matthew Shipp Hamid Drake - trio with Matthew Shipp (piano) and Hamid Drake (drums)
2015 December	2017 May	This Is Beautiful Because We Are Beautiful People	ESP-Disk'	ESP 5011	TOXIC Mat Walerian Matthew Shipp William Parker - trio with Matthew Shipp (piano) and William Parker (bass)
2018 May	2020 July	Every Dog Has Its Day But It Doesn't Matter Because Fat Cat Is Getting Fatter	ESP-Disk'	ESP 5037	OKUDEN Mat Walerian Matthew Shipp William Parker Hamid Drake - quartet with Matthew Shipp (piano), William Parker (bass) and Hamid Drake (drums)

=== As sideman ===
Recorded	Release year	Title	Label	Catalog	Leader/Band	Personnel
2015 December	2018 February	Sonic Fiction	ESP-Disk'	ESP 5018	Matthew Shipp Quartet	Matthew Shipp (piano) Mat Walerian (saxophone, clarinets) Michael Bisio (bass) Whit Dickey (drums)

== Okuden Music Concert Series ==
In 2010 Mat Walerian started curating his own concert series, Okuden Music, described as "sound to the deepest", presenting the mainstream of modern jazz and improvised avant-garde music heritage. Okuden Music Concert Series got extensive review in "Polish Jazz Recordings and Beyond" - reference work containing an encyclopedic directory of Polish jazz recordings, written by a world-renowned, prominent theoretical physicist Maciej Lewenstein.
