= Live at Okuden =

Live at Okuden may refer to:

- Live at Okuden (2015 album), a 2015 album by jazz duet "The Uppercut : Matthew Shipp Mat Walerian duo"
- Live at Okuden (2016 album), a 2016 live double album by jazz trio Jungle
