= Evenings at the Village Gate: John Coltrane with Eric Dolphy =

Live album by John Coltrane
- Released: July 14, 2023
- Recorded: August 1961
- Venue: Village Gate, Greenwich Village, Manhattan, New York City, New York, United States
- Genre: Avant-garde jazz
- Length: 79:51
- Language: English
- Label: Impulse!

John Coltrane chronology
A Love Supreme: Live in Seattle (2021)	Evenings at the Village Gate: John Coltrane with Eric Dolphy (2023)

Evenings at the Village Gate: John Coltrane with Eric Dolphy is a live album recorded in 1961 featuring jazz musicians John Coltrane and Eric Dolphy, released on Impulse! Records in 2023.

== Recording and release ==
By 1961, Coltrane had begun experimenting with modes and genre, moving towards the avant-garde sound that would be featured on records like Africa/Brass. This period of experimentation proved highly controversial and Coltrane and collaborator Eric Dolphy faced criticism that their music during this period was "anti-jazz". The recordings on this album are from a brief residency in mid-1961 that the duo had at the Village Gate and were recorded for posterity's sake by engineer Richard Alderson. They were rediscovered decades later in a New York Public Library collection.

== Critical reception ==
According to the review aggregator Metacritic, Evenings at the Village Gate: John Coltrane with Eric Dolphy received "universal acclaim" based on a weighted average score of 91 out of 100 from four critic scores.

In Financial Times, Mike Hobart gave this work 4 out of 5 stars, stating: "the set stands up well against Coltrane’s other live recordings of the time". In Glide Magazine, Jim Hynes called this recording "seminal" and additionally praised the extensive liner notes. Andrew Male of Mojo gave this release 4 out of 5 stars, praising several tracks, including the concluding recording of "Africa" as being like a "historic moment", and also notes the extensive liner notes from Ashley Kahn. The New Yorker's Richard Brody praised all of the performers and connected Coltrane's musical evolution here with the 1964 recording of A Love Supreme; he sums up his review "the new release exemplifies, in its passionate strivings, the essence of jazz modernity and the spirit of the age".

Editors at Pitchfork chose this as one of the Best New Reissues and critic Daniel Felsenthal scored it a 9.2 for being "a freeze-frame of jazz as it escapes the present and absconds to the future". At Qobuz's music magazine, this was chosen as Album of the Week, with critic Fred Cisterna calling it a "masterpiece" and continues that "the instrumental balance on the unearthed tapes isn’t flawless, but that’s a quibble: the overall sound and room tone are good, and the music stuns". Writing for Tidal, Brad Farberman called this period "an important stepping stone" toward Coltrane's A Love Supreme and Dolphy's Out to Lunch! Chris Pearson of The Times rated this release 4 out of 5 stars, writing that Coltrane and Dolphy were at artistic heights, but criticizes Reggie Workman's solo in "Africa". In Under the Radar, Matthew Berlyant scored this album 8 out of 10, characterizing the release as "an absolute delight for those who want to hear these two colossuses of the saxophone".

Editors at Stereogum run a monthly article on the state of jazz and the July 2023 edition included a retrospective on Chief Xian aTunde Adjuah and the intersection of African music with jazz forms. The article ends with a discussion of Coltrane's "Africa" and critic Phil Freeman calls this recording of the composition "an incredible mood piece".

In a piece on jazz drumming for Paste, Geoffrey Himes called this the "most exciting jazz reissue of the year" and called special attention to Elvin Jones; Himes also called this one of the most overlooked albums of 2023. Editors at online retailer Qobuz included this on their list of the best jazz albums of 2023. Graham Reid of The New Zealand Herald included this in his favorite albums of 2023. David Weininger of The Boston Globe listed this among the nine best album reissues of 2023. Editors at Mojo chose this for the second best reissue of 2023.

Evenings at the Village Gate: John Coltrane with Eric Dolphy was nominated for Best Album Notes at the 66th Annual Grammy Awards.

== Track listing ==
1. "My Favorite Things" (Oscar Hammerstein II and Richard Rodgers) – 15:45
2. "When Lights Are Low" (Benny Carter) – 15:10
3. "Impressions" (Coltrane) – 10:00
4. "Greensleeves" (traditional) – 16:15
5. "Africa" (Coltrane) – 22:41

== Personnel ==
- John Coltrane – soprano saxophone, tenor saxophone
- Eric Dolphy – alto saxophone, bass clarinet, flute
- Art Davis – double bass
- Elvin Jones – drums
- McCoy Tyner – piano
- Reggie Workman – double bass, liner notes

Technical personnel

- Richard Alderson – recording, liner notes
- Lakecia Benjamin – liner notes
- Ashley Kahn – liner notes
- Branford Marsalis – liner notes
- Herb Snitzer – photography

== Charts ==
Evenings at the Village Gate: John Coltrane with Eric Dolphy was commercially successful, debuting at No. 8 on Top Album Sales, No. 1 on Jazz Albums, No. 1 on Traditional Jazz Albums, No. 4 on Tastemaker Albums, No. 7 on Top Current Album Sales, No. 10 on Vinyl Albums, and No. 156 on Billboard 200 charts.

Chart performance for Evenings at the Village Gate: John Coltrane with Eric Dolphy
Chart	Peak
German Albums (Offizielle Top 100)	13
Swiss Albums (Schweizer Hitparade)	45
US Billboard 200	156
US Top Jazz Albums (Billboard)	1

== See also ==
- 2023 in American music
- 2023 in jazz
- List of 2023 albums
