= Both Directions at Once: The Lost Album =

Studio album by John Coltrane
- Released: June 29, 2018
- Recorded: March 6, 1963
- Studios: Van Gelder, Englewood Cliffs, New Jersey, US
- Genre: Jazz
- Language: Instrumental
- Label: Impulse!
- Compilers: Ravi Coltrane; Ken Druker

John Coltrane chronology
The Atlantic Years in Mono (2016)	Both Directions at Once: The Lost Album (2018)	Blue World (2019)

Both Directions at Once: The Lost Album is a studio album recorded by American jazz saxophonist John Coltrane for Impulse! Records and released in 2018. The recordings were made in 1963 during Coltrane's Classic Quartet period but lost for decades.

== Background and recording ==
Both Directions at Once was recorded at Van Gelder Studio in New Jersey on March 6, 1963, by saxophonist John Coltrane and his Quartet: double bassist Jimmy Garrison, drummer Elvin Jones and pianist McCoy Tyner. The session took place on the last day of a two-week stint at Birdland. The next day, the group would join singer Johnny Hartman for the recording of John Coltrane and Johnny Hartman.

To cut down on storage space, Impulse! Records destroyed the master tape, and the recording was lost for decades. The seven tracks on Both Directions survived as a copy Coltrane gave to his first wife, Juanita Naima. Van Gelder made a separate copy for Coltrane to listen to at home. In 2005, after the Guernsey's auction house announced plans to sell Coltrane-related artifacts, the record company intervened to acquire the tapes. Coltrane's son Ravi and studio executive Ken Druker assembled the final album with liner notes written by Ashley Kahn. Ravi recalled that he and the others involved in the preparation of the album were "over the moon," and commented: "We spend our lives following these players, recording, studying them, transcribing them – you go at the new material like it's sustenance."

The album's title came from a recollection by Wayne Shorter, who stated that at one point, Coltrane told him that what he was attempting to achieve musically was "starting a sentence in the middle, and then going to the beginning and the end of it at the same time... both directions at once."

== Release history ==
The standard edition of the album includes one recording of each track and expanded deluxe editions include multiple takes, including several of the title track from Impressions. All tracks were previously unreleased except for the fifth take of "Vilia", which was included in the 1965 sampler The Definitive Jazz Scene, Vol. 3 and the CD reissue of Live at Birdland. Impulse! followed the release with 2019's Blue World, from a lost 1964 session.

== Critical reception ==
Professional ratings
Aggregate scores
Source	Rating
Metacritic	90/100
Review scores
Source	Rating
AllMusic	4/5 stars
Drowned in Sound	9/10
The Guardian	4/5 stars
The Line of Best Fit	10/10
Pitchfork	8.6/10
Q	4/5 stars
Rolling Stone	4.5/5 stars
Uncut	9/10

Giovanni Russonello of The New York Times noted that, on the album, "we hear something close to the breadth of what Coltrane and his associates were delivering onstage," and commented: "the band was working in its own lingua franca, basically playing a version of its live set. Even more than on the album Coltrane from a year before, we can feel how closely connected these musicians... had become, and how combustive those live moments must have been."

Marc Myers, in an article for The Wall Street Journal, stated that the release "provides significant insights into the highly charged sound of the John Coltrane Quartet," and concluded that "it's impossible not to hear the feeling of Both Directions in Coltrane's solos on his Johnny Hartman album. The two are now forever linked."

Writing for Spin, Winston Cook-Wilson remarked: "Both Directions at Once... speaks to Coltrane's humility as a stylist, and the reason why he is revered by jazz fans of all persuasions, including anyone who only knows the bare minimum number of albums. If it's not Giant Steps, the album that type of casual Coltrane fan knows is A Love Supreme. Both Directions at Once definitely isn't Supreme, but it enhances our understanding of how that group of musicians came to make it."

In a review for Rolling Stone, Hank Shteamer wrote: "Don't expect a readymade masterpiece... better to view The Lost Album as a key transitional document. For the die-hards... it's another small but crucial puzzle piece in the group's still-stunning evolution during its roughly three-year lifespan. For everyone else, it's an unvarnished, day-in-the-life portrait of an icon – and the three musical giants that helped him achieve that status – at work."

Richard Brody, writing for The New Yorker, found the album "moving and illuminating, as it fills in some of the background and middle range of Coltrane's career," but stated: "it doesn't hold a place in the foreground of his career or his discography. The very fact of its rediscovery and release is wondrous, and I wouldn't want to be without it. For those who listen to much Coltrane, it's a significant and valuable supplement. For those who don't, I suspect that it's likelier to inspire admiration rather than excitement, interest rather than love."

In an article for The Guardian, Geoff Dyer stated: "Coltrane's quartet... come powering out of the blocks. So completely were they living within the process of music-making that they could pick things up at a moment's notice... The result is not likely to be high on any list of jazz essentials but it illustrates how the forward momentum of creative expression was harnessed, at this point, by a constant desire to maintain and extend the commercial success achieved a couple of years earlier by My Favorite Things."

Writing for Variety, Chris Morris commented: "At its heart, Both Directions at Once is a portrait of an artist and a band on the brink of a historic explosion. The bracing, probing, self-questioning and keenly played music on this collection is the missing link between the provisional work heard on 1962's Coltrane and the quartet's epochal studio albums... that would follow in 1964-65. Is its belated arrival a godsend? Absolutely."

Coltrane biographer Ben Ratliff noted: "The music does not seem, in its context, to be a full step forward. It's a little caught between shoring up and surging forth... It can give you new respect for the rigor, compression, and balance of some of his other albums from the period... It is possible to take in Both Directions at Once, some of it middling by Coltrane's standards and some of it extraordinary by anyone's, without much thought about sellability or progress. In an ideal case, both qualities are overrated anyway. This is an ideal case."

In a review for JazzTimes, Michael J. West remarked: "the music is remarkable and revelatory. It offers a fresh new look at how Coltrane was evolving at a previously underdocumented moment in his artistry, and adds new compositions to his catalog."

In a review for AllMusic, Stephen Thomas Erlewine wrote: "As a historical document, this is a necessary footnote, providing evidence that the experimental side of Coltrane did not lay dormant during the early '60s, but the pleasant surprise is that Both Directions at Once is also enjoyable on its own terms as a long-playing record... Both Directions at Once is truly a rare thing: an important discovery from the vault that's also a blast to hear."

Nate Chinen, writing for NPR Music, noted: "In the end, it makes little difference whether or not this superlative clutch of material amounts to a 'lost album' or something messier and less conclusive. What really matters is the seeking, as Coltrane always understood."

== Track listing ==
All tracks are written by John Coltrane, except as noted.

Standard edition
No.	Title	Writer(s)	Length
1.	"Untitled Original 11383" (take 1)		5:41
2.	"Nature Boy"	eden ahbez	3:24
3.	"Untitled Original 11386" (take 1)		8:43
4.	"Vilia" (take 3)	Franz Lehár	5:32
5.	"Impressions" (take 3)		4:36
6.	"Slow Blues"		11:28
7.	"One Up, One Down" (take 1)		8:01

Deluxe edition bonus disc
No.	Title	Writer(s)	Length
1.	"Vilia" (take 5)	Lehár	4:37
2.	"Impressions" (take 1)		4:06
3.	"Impressions" (take 2)		4:37
4.	"Impressions" (take 4)		3:40
5.	"Untitled Original 11386" (take 2)		8:41
6.	"Untitled Original 11386" (take 5)		8:23
7.	"One Up, One Down" (take 6)		7:17

- "Vilia" based on Franz Lehár's "Vilja Song" from The Merry Widow.

== Personnel ==
=== The John Coltrane Quartet ===
- John Coltrane – tenor saxophone, soprano saxophone
- McCoy Tyner – piano
- Jimmy Garrison – bass
- Elvin Jones – drums

=== Technical personnel ===
- Bob Thiele – producer
- Rudy Van Gelder – mixing engineer
- Ravi Coltrane, Ken Druker – compilation producer
- Ashley Kahn – liner notes

== Charts ==
This album was Coltrane's debut on the Billboard 200.

=== Weekly charts ===
Sales chart positions for Both Directions at Once: The Lost Album
Chart (2018)	Peak position
Austrian Albums (Ö3 Austria)	6
Belgian Albums (Ultratop Flanders)	7
Belgian Albums (Ultratop Wallonia)	23
Canadian Albums (Billboard)	37
Dutch Albums (Album Top 100)	17
German Albums (Offizielle Top 100)	3
Irish Albums (IRMA)	37
Italian Albums (FIMI)	18
Portuguese Albums (AFP)	4
Scottish Albums (Official Charts)	9
Spanish Albums (PROMUSICAE)	5
Swiss Albums (Schweizer Hitparade)	4
UK Albums (Official Charts)	15
US Billboard 200	21
US Top Jazz Albums (Billboard)	1

=== Year-end charts ===
Year-end chart positions for Both Directions at Once: The Lost Album
Chart (2018)	Position
Belgian Albums (Ultratop Flanders)	148
US Top Jazz Albums (Billboard)	2
Chart (2019)	Position
US Top Jazz Albums (Billboard)	7
