= Blue World (album) =

Soundtrack album by John Coltrane
- Released: September 27, 2019
- Recorded: June 24, 1964
- Studios: Van Gelder Studio, Englewood Cliffs, New Jersey, U.S.
- Genre: Jazz
- Length: 36:33
- Language: Instrumental
- Label: Impulse!

John Coltrane chronology
| Both Directions at Once: The Lost Album (2018) | Blue World (2019) | A Love Supreme: Live in Seattle (2021) |

Blue World is an album of 1964 John Coltrane recordings, created as a soundtrack for the Canadian film The Cat in the Bag, and released on September 27, 2019. The release has received positive reception from critics.

== Recording and release ==
The album was recorded at Van Gelder Studio with the Classic Quartet in between the Crescent and A Love Supreme sessions for the film Le chat dans le sac. Director Gilles Groulx was friends with Jimmy Garrison and he used that relationship to request songs for Coltrane's quartet to record. Groulx traveled to the United States to attend the recording sessions for Coltrane's only soundtrack work and Coltrane recorded it without informing his record label. After three hours in the studio, Groulx took the master tapes with him to Canada.

The recordings were stored away until the early 21st century, when an archivist from the National Film Board of Canada was tasked with assembling Groulx's work. The government agency negotiated with Impulse! Records to have the album released. Release was delayed by several years due to the NFB owning the rights to the tape itself but Impulse! having the rights to release it as an album. The original composition "Blue World" was released on August 16, 2019, along with the announcement of the album.

This album came a year after the successful release of Both Directions at Once: The Lost Album, also from Impulse!, capturing a Classic Quartet session from 1963, and is part of a trend of unreleased albums from 1950s and 1960s jazz greats released in the 2010s.

== Reception ==
Professional ratings
Review scores
| Source | Rating |
|---|---|
| AllMusic | 3.5/5 stars |
| All About Jazz | 3.5/5 stars |
| The Guardian | 4/5 stars |
| Pitchfork | 8.4.10 |
| The Times | 3/5 stars |

Stereogum's Phil Freeman gave the soundtrack a positive review, calling the piece a coherent recording that almost functions as a suite and writing that the performances are "fascinating and entertaining". For The Arts Fuse, Michael Ullman claims that Coltrane fans will "have to have" the album, particularly for the clarity of the recording during the Classic Quartet period. Victor L. Schermer, writing for All About Jazz, recommended the album with a rating of 3.5 out of 5, summing up, "The one great thing about it is that it keeps the jazz world attuned to all that Coltrane has to offer." Giovanni Russonello of The New York Times gave a positive review to both the performance on the album as well as its production, pointing out how, "Garrison's bass is turned up rather high, giving the entire session a pulpy, magnetic aura"; he additionally called the recordings an "outlier" in Coltrane's catalogue that is "more like a favor to a young filmmaker than an expression of where Coltrane was creatively in that moment".

For The Times, Chris Pearson, gave the album three out of five stars, calling the music "beautifully recorded" but noting that this is a historical artifact for its purpose as a soundtrack. The Guardian named it Jazz Album of the Month, with John Fordham giving it four out of five stars for being "a fascinating hybrid of Coltrane's song-based earlier methods, and his incandescently devotional late period". Pitchfork named this the best new reissue of September 2019, with Nate Chinen giving it 8.4 out of 10, writing, "There's no serious argument to be made for its integrity as a proper album; there's too much redundancy for that, and no way of knowing what Coltrane would have wanted. But the strongest moments on this offhanded, unintended artifact are remarkable even by the standards of this band at this juncture, and the historical record will reflect that."

== Track listing ==
All songs written by John Coltrane.

| No. | Title | Length |
|---|---|---|
| 1. | "Naima" (Take 1) | 4:36 |
| 2. | "Village Blues" (Take 2) | 3:46 |
| 3. | "Blue World" | 6:08 |
| 4. | "Village Blues" (Take 1) | 3:48 |
| 5. | "Village Blues" (Take 3) | 3:46 |
| 6. | "Like Sonny" | 2:43 |
| 7. | "Traneing In" | 7:38 |
| 8. | "Naima" (Take 2) | 4:08 |
| Total length: | | 36:33 |

== Personnel ==
The John Coltrane Quartet

- John Coltrane – leader, composer, tenor saxophone, soprano saxophone, production
- Jimmy Garrison – double bass
- Elvin Jones – drums
- McCoy Tyner – piano

Additional personnel

- Ken Druker – production
- Ashley Kahn – liner notes
- Kevin Reeves – mastering
- Rudy Van Gelder – recording, mixing, mastering

== Charts ==
Chart performance for Blue World
| Chart (2019) | Peak position |
|---|---|
| Austrian Albums (Ö3 Austria) | 30 |
| Belgian Albums (Ultratop Flanders) | 73 |
| Belgian Albums (Ultratop Wallonia) | 54 |
| Canadian Albums (Billboard) | 64 |
| German Albums (Offizielle Top 100) | 21 |
| Italian Albums (FIMI) | 48 |
| Japanese Albums (Oricon) | 47 |
| Portuguese Albums (AFP) | 13 |
| Scottish Albums (Official Charts) | 27 |
| Spanish Albums (PROMUSICAE) | 50 |
| Swiss Albums (Schweizer Hitparade) | 45 |
| US Billboard 200 | 76 |
