= Mystic Voyage =

Studio album by Roy Ayers Ubiquity
- Released: 1975
- Studio: Kaye-Smith/Van Ackeren (Seattle, WA); Electric Lady (New York City, NY)
- Genre: Jazz-funk
- Length: 42:02
- Label: Polydor
- Producer: Roy Ayers

Roy Ayers Ubiquity chronology
Change Up the Groove (1974)	Mystic Voyage (1975)	A Tear to a Smile (1975)

Singles from Mystic Voyage
- 1. "Mystic Voyage" Released: 1975

Professional ratings
Review scores
Source	Rating
AllMusic	3/5 stars

Mystic Voyage is a studio album by Roy Ayers Ubiquity. It was released in 1975 through Polydor Records. The recording sessions took place at Kaye-Smith/Van Ackeren Studios in Seattle, Washington, and at Electric Lady Studios in New York City. The album is dedicated to the memory of Julian "Cannonball" Adderley.

The album peaked at number 90 on the Billboard Top LPs chart and number 13 on the R&B albums chart in the United States. Its lead single, "Mystic Voyage", reached No. 70 on the R&B singles chart.

== Track listing ==
No.	Title	Writer(s)	Length
1.	"Brother Green (The Disco King)"	Roy Ayers; Edwin Birdsong	5:41
2.	"Mystic Voyage"	Roy Ayers	3:40
3.	"A Wee Bit"	Calvin Brown	2:46
4.	"Take All the Time You Need"	Nickolas Ashford; Valerie Simpson	5:36
5.	"Evolution"	Roy Ayers	4:33
6.	"Life Is Just a Moment, Pt. 1"	Roy Ayers; Chano O'Ferral	4:04
7.	"Life Is Just a Moment, Pt. 2"	Roy Ayers; Chano O'Ferral	2:32
8.	"Funky Motion"	Ronnie Foster	3:16
9.	"Spirit of Doo Do"	Edwin Birdsong	5:57
10.	"The Black Five"	Roy Ayers	3:57
Total length:			42:02

== Personnel ==
Roy Ayers Ubiquity

- Roy Ayers – lead vocals, vibraphone, electric piano, clavinet, percussion, ARP synthesizer, arrangement (tracks: 1, 2, 4–10), producer
- Debby "Chicas" Darby – lead vocals, backing vocals
- Edwin L. Birdsong – vocals
- Calvin Brown – vocals, guitar, arrangement (track 3)
- Byron Lee Miller – bass, backing vocals
- Richard David Lawson – drums
- Chano O'Ferral – bongos, congas
- Willie Michael – percussion
- Joe Brazil – soprano saxophone
- Onzy Durrett Matthews Jr. – arrangement

Technical

- Ron Gangnes – recording
- Ralph Moss – engineering
- Buzz Richmond – engineering
- Neal Teeman – assistant engineering
- Sheri Leverich – art direction
- David Rawcliffe – photography
- Joel Brodsky – photography
- Robert Hickson – illustration

== Chart history ==
Chart (1976)	Peak position
US Billboard 200	90
US Top R&B/Hip-Hop Albums (Billboard)	13
