= Tarik (album) =

Studio album by Dewey Redman
- Released: 1969
- Recorded: October 1, 1969
- Genre: Jazz
- Length: 47:11
- Label: BYG Actuel
- Producer: Jean Georgakarakos & Jean-Luc Young

Dewey Redman chronology
Look for the Black Star (1966)	Tarik (1969)	The Ear of the Behearer (1973)

Tarik is an album by American jazz saxophonist Dewey Redman featuring performances recorded in 1969 for the French BYG Actuel label.

== Reception ==
The Allmusic review by Scott Yanow awarded the album 4 stars stating "Redman has long been one of the most accessible of the avant-garde players due to his large tone, his willingness to swing hard, and his logical if emotional ideas... This album is well worth searching for".

Professional ratings
Review scores
Source	Rating
Allmusic	4/5 stars

== Track listing ==
All compositions by Dewey Redman

1. "Tarik" - 4:45
2. "Fo Io" - 5:08
3. "Paris? Oui!" - 13:39
4. "Lop-O-Lop" - 13:06
5. "Related and Unrelated Vibrations" - 10:33

- Recorded at Studio E.T.A. in Paris, France, on October 1, 1969

== Personnel ==
- Dewey Redman - tenor saxophone, musette
- Malachi Favors - bass
- Ed Blackwell - drums
