= The Africa/Brass Sessions, Volume 2 =

The Africa/Brass Sessions, Vol. 2

Compilation album by John Coltrane
- Released: June 1974
- Recorded: May 23 and June 4, 1961
- Genre: Jazz
- Length: 33:27
- Label: Impulse!
- Producer: Creed Taylor

John Coltrane chronology
Interstellar Space (1974)	The Africa/Brass Sessions, Vol. 2 (1974)	First Meditations (1977)

The Africa/Brass Sessions, Vol. 2 is a posthumous compilation album by American jazz saxophonist and composer John Coltrane, released in 1974 by Impulse Records. It compiles outtakes from the same 1961 sessions that produced his Africa/Brass album. "Song of the Underground Railroad" and "Greensleeves" were recorded on May 23, while "Africa" was recorded on June 4. On October 10, 1995, Impulse incorporated the tracks issued here into a two-disc set entitled The Complete Africa/Brass Sessions.

== Background ==
After a successful series of albums for Atlantic Records, Coltrane signed to the developing, more jazz-oriented Impulse! Records. He assembled a 17-piece orchestra and started to record a series of sessions called Africa/Brass with musicians such as trumpeters Booker Little and Freddie Hubbard, trombonist Julian Priester, bassists Paul Chambers and Reggie Workman, reed player Eric Dolphy, pianist McCoy Tyner, and drummer Elvin Jones. The Africa/Brass Sessions, Volume 2 compiled music from the second installment of the sessions in 1961.

== Critical reception ==
Professional ratings
Review scores
Source	Rating
AllMusic	4/5 stars
And It Don't Stop	A
Encyclopedia of Popular Music	4/5 stars
Rolling Stone Jazz Record Guide	4/5 stars
Tom Hull – on the Web	A−
The Village Voice	A

In The Village Voice, Robert Christgau wrote that he "gave up listening" to the rest of Coltrane's posthumous albums but still listens to The Africa/Brass Sessions, Volume 2 "all the time". In a retrospective review, AllMusic's Lindsay Planer praised Coltrane's command of his orchestra and his own playing: "The amazing virtuosity in Coltrane's solos had begun to show signs of the future direction his later avant-garde sides would take." Revisiting his preference of Vol. 2 over the original Africa/Brass, Christgau wrote in 2020 that "the dollops of massed horns that give the album its name contrast far more dynamically against the forward-looking 'Song of the Underground Railroad' than the original album's generic 'Blues Minor.' And while I admit that Elvin Jones is more spectacular on the 1961 'Greensleeves,' the world is a better place with two of 'em."

== Track listing ==
=== Side one ===
No.	Title	Writer(s)	Length
1.	"Song of the Underground Railroad"	traditional	6:44
2.	"Greensleeves"	traditional	10:53

=== Side two ===
No.	Title	Writer(s)	Length
1.	"Africa"	John Coltrane	16:08

== Personnel ==
=== Musicians ===
- John Coltrane — soprano and tenor saxophone
- Booker Little — trumpet
- Freddie Hubbard — trumpet on May 23 session only
- Britt Woodman — trombone on June 4 session only
- Charles Greenlee — euphonium on May 23 session only
- Julian Priester — euphonium on May 23 session only
- Carl Bowman — euphonium on June 4 session only
- Bill Barber — tuba
- Garvin Bushell — piccolo, woodwinds on May 23 session only
- Donald Corrado — french horn
- Bob Northern — french horn
- Robert Swisshelm — french horn
- Julius Watkins — french horn
- Jim Buffington — french horn on May 23 session only
- Eric Dolphy — alto saxophone, bass clarinet, flute
- Pat Patrick — baritone saxophone
- McCoy Tyner — piano
- Reggie Workman — bass
- Art Davis — bass on "Africa" only
- Elvin Jones — drums

=== Production ===
- Creed Taylor — record producer
- Rudy Van Gelder — audio engineer
- Eric Dolphy, McCoy Tyner — orchestrations
