= Om (John Coltrane album) =

Studio album by John Coltrane
- Released: January 1968
- Recorded: October 1, 1965
- Studio: Camelot Sound Studios, Ballard, Seattle, Washington
- Genre: Free jazz, avant-garde jazz
- Length: 29:07
- Label: Impulse! A-9140
- Producer: Bob Thiele

John Coltrane chronology
Expression (1967)	Om (1968)	Cosmic Music (1968)

Professional ratings
Review scores
Source	Rating
Allmusic	3/5 stars
DownBeat	4/5 stars
Sputnikmusic	4/5 stars
The Rolling Stone Jazz Record Guide	3/5 stars

Om is a posthumously released album by John Coltrane, recorded on October 1, 1965, one day after the recording of Live in Seattle, and one day prior to the recording of the music heard on A Love Supreme: Live in Seattle. The album, which features Coltrane's quartet plus three additional players, consists of a single 29-minute work that was split into two parts when released on LP. Om was issued by Impulse! in 1968, and was also included on The Major Works of John Coltrane, a compilation CD released in 1992.

== Background ==
During September 14–26, 1965, the John Coltrane Quartet played an engagement at the Jazz Workshop in San Francisco. The saxophonist Pharoah Sanders, whose music Coltrane admired, and who had previously recorded with Coltrane on Ascension, went to hear the group and was invited to sit in. According to Sanders, "[H]e told me then that he was thinking of changing the group and changing the music, to get different sounds. He asked me to play with him." At the same time, the multi-instrumentalist Donald Garrett, who had played with Coltrane's group in 1961 as a second bassist, was also asked to sit in. At the end of the two-week gig, both Sanders and Garrett were asked to join the band, and accompanied it to the next engagement, September 27 - October 2, at The Penthouse in Seattle.

During the stay in Seattle, Coltrane decided to document the newly expanded group at his own expense, hiring the recording engineer Jan Kurtis for the September 30 gig. Music from this date was released in 1971 on Live in Seattle, with additional tracks issued in 2011 on The Unissued Seattle Broadcast. The next day, the whole band, with the addition of Joe Brazil, traveled to Kurtis' studio, Camelot Sound Studios, in a rented house in Lynnwood, to record Om. On the following day, the band wrapped up their Seattle engagement at The Penthouse with a performance of "A Love Supreme", a recording of which was issued in 2021 on A Love Supreme: Live in Seattle, then headed to Los Angeles for an eleven-day stay at the It Club, during which they recorded the tracks "Kulu Sé Mama (Juno Sé Mama)" and "Selflessness", both of which appear on the CD version of the album Kulu Sé Mama.

It is believed that Coltrane was using LSD during the recording, though this is disputed. Lewis Porter wrote that "Coltrane may have been tripping on LSD when he recorded Om. It is certain that he did begin using LSD around this time," "according to four reliable sources, speaking off the record." However, Porter was careful to point out that Coltrane's playing "is perfectly coherent on all his late recordings - in fact, incredibly so", adding: "he probably felt or hoped that LSD could help him in the direction he already wanted to go".

== Music ==
The album's title refers to the sacred sound and spiritual symbol in Indian religions. Coltrane described Om as "the first vibration - that sound, that spirit, which set everything else into being. It is The Word from which all men and everything else comes, including all possible sounds that man can make vocally. It is the first syllable, the primal word, the word of power."

The recording begins with quiet percussion, after which the musicians chant in unison a verse from chapter nine of the Bhagavad Gita:

Rites that the Vedas ordain, and the rituals taught by the scriptures, all these am I, and the offering made to the ghosts of the fathers, herbs of healing and food. The mantram. The clarified butter. I, the oblation and I, the flame into which it is offered. I am the sire of the world, and this world's mother and grandsire. I am he who awards to each the fruit of his action. I make all things clean. I am Om!

Regarding the next section, writer Peter Bebergal commented:

Coltrane and his compatriots start chanting "om" as if they are caught on fire by it. It's not meditative, but rather honors the actual meaning of the Sanskrit, "to shout." But the word "om" is also a vibration, a reflection of the unity of all things before creation. It is the manifestation of the truth essential to Hindu philosophy that Brahman (God) and the Atman (Soul) are one; their separateness is an illusion. The acknowledgement of this truth, or rather the attempt to get inside of it, is what Coltrane seems to be doing with Om.

(Guerino Mazzola and Paul Cherlin suggested that the Live in Seattle track "Evolution", recorded the previous day, and featuring "trance-like moaning", can be heard as a direct forebear to the chanting in Om.)

The chanting is succeeded by a dense, loud ensemble passage, after which Coltrane, Sanders, and Tyner solo. The solos are followed by what has been described as "jungle sound" in which "the culture of jazz, or of any kind of civilization, is left behind". This section features, among other things, quavering flutes, animal noises, a yodeling voice, and both basses playing bowed harmonics and glissandi. This leads to a Coltrane / Sanders duet and a climactic ensemble passage, after which the word "om" is once again heard, followed by a closing recitation of the verse from the Bhagavad Gita.

In the liner notes, Nat Hentoff wrote: "It may be that to break the circumscribed limits of conventional hearing, the ear must be propelled to hear sounds and pitches it has rejected in the past, just as compassion is not come by in conventional comfort. And once heard and absorbed, these sounds lead to further extensions of listening and feeling capacities... In so far as one can ever advise anyone else in how to listen, I would suggest that they start by not worrying about how it is all structured, where it's leading. Let the music come in without any pre-set definitions of what jazz has to be, of what music has to be."

== Legacy and reception ==
According to Eric Nisenson, Coltrane, "clearly embarrassed by Om, instructed Bob Thiele that he never wanted it released." However, Thiele, the director and producer of Impulse!, did release it in 1968 to capitalize on Coltrane's death and on the growing psychedelic rock scene at the time. Upon its release, "a copy was almost immediately placed in the window of the Haight-Ashbury Psychedelic Shop." Coltrane scholar Ashley Kahn wrote: "In title and cover, it could not have been more timely, tying into the look and feel of the year that brought forth the Summer of Love."

Opinions regarding Om have been mixed. According to Lewis Porter, "Some fans were taken aback by the group chanting... Coltrane was allowing an informality and spiritualism into his recordings and performances that some found amateurish; others found it freeing and revolutionary." David Nelson McCarthy called it "Coltrane's only major release of questionable quality... featuring screechy playing and moaning vocals, this is for true believers and historical interest only." Ben Ratliff described it as "a fairly disjointed, agitated, muddy, twenty-nine-minute catharsis."

In an AllMusic review, Stacia Proefrock commented: "Condemned by many critics as John Coltrane's worst album, Om suffers only in comparison to the great works that preceded it... Om... seems... like a pure release of energy... Regardless of its seeming chaos, this is a deeply spiritual work... Om resonates with passion and yearning, but has a frantic edge that suggests that opening up to all of that powerful spiritual energy might have been a frightening experience... Om doesn't deserve the dismissal it has been given by critics. It is an important work in the history of free jazz that opens up considerably by the end of its 29 minutes, revealing the expansive contents of a jazz master's mind."

Guerino Mazzola and Paul Cherlin wrote that "Compared to the other LPs of that year (1965), Om lives on another planet... This journey is not for beginners... It would be fair to listen to this performance without any reference to jazz or to any other disciplined utterance of music." In an article for All About Jazz, Simon Weil wrote: "Om qualifies as fearsome. There are moments, particularly during the closing unison passages, when it feels like one is getting beaten over the head with a blunt instrument. It becomes unbearable. But I believe that such an effect was in line with Coltrane's intentions... Coltrane is trying to evoke the voice of God at the Dawn of Creation in this track. But hearing the voice of God at the Dawn of Creation is much like confronting the face of God. This is going to be an awesome and overwhelming experience—which one can only take for so long. But I think there ought therefore to be some unbearability in the music as well —because one should neither really be able to look God full in the face, nor hear his voice without quailing somewhat. So then Om must be 'difficult'."

Ashley Kahn described Om as "a single spiraling, epic composition that... musically fused the spontaneous energy of Ascension with the spiritual resonance of A Love Supreme". A reviewer for Norman Records called Om "one of the most singular psychedelic experiences in music, an all-engulfing kaleidoscope that offers us a rare glimpse at a completely unencumbered Coltrane", and concluded: "If you’re looking for catharsis in Coltrane’s discography, Om is where you’ll find it."

In an essay for The Quietus, Peter Bebergal stated: "The fierceness of Coltrane's playing indicates that he knows the divine cannot be contained in a thin tube of molded brass. But this is all he has. This is all anyone of us really has. Music binds us to the body. It is where we hear it and where we make it. With Om, Coltrane often plays as if he is trying to escape the bonds of the instrument, but his feet won't leave the Earth... Coltrane is trying to give us a glimpse of his heaven, but the noise of his saxophone contains its own holiness by virtue of it being the vessel through which the divine reveals itself". He concluded: "while Om might not easily alter the consciousness of the listener, it still comes awfully close to revealing the intense spiritual desire of Coltrane that shapes the almost desperate mood. It is, however, also a glimpse into the vast spectrum of non-ordinary states of consciousness... Coltrane's ache to break through is humbled by the living organism of the band and the session itself... There is a strange and frightening purity here, one that you don't want to get too close to, but demands respect... Coltrane is the ever-building ascension, over and over again, wanting nothing more than for God to open the gates, all the while begging him to please keep them closed."

== Track listing ==
Side A
No.	Title	Length
1.	"Om, Part 1"	15:06

Side B
No.	Title	Length
2.	"Om, Part 2"	14:01

Note: while some CD configurations had "Om" as a single track, others kept the original LP record's two-track configuration.

== Personnel ==
- John Coltrane - tenor and soprano saxophone
- Pharoah Sanders - tenor saxophone
- Donald Rafael Garrett - double bass and clarinet
- Joe Brazil - flute
- McCoy Tyner - piano
- Jimmy Garrison - bass
- Elvin Jones - drums
