= Meditations (John Coltrane album) =

Studio album by John Coltrane
- Released: September 1966
- Recorded: November 23, 1965
- Studio: Van Gelder (Englewood Cliffs)
- Genres: Free jazz; avant-garde jazz
- Length: 40:29
- Labels: Impulse! A-9110
- Producer: Bob Thiele

John Coltrane chronology
The Avant-Garde (1966)	Meditations (1966)	Live at the Village Vanguard Again! (1966)

Professional ratings
Review scores
Source	Rating
AllMusic	4.5/5 stars
DownBeat	(Don DeMichael) / (William Russo)
The Encyclopedia of Popular Music	4/5 stars
The Penguin Guide to Jazz	3.5/4 stars
The Rolling Stone Jazz Record Guide	5/5 stars

Meditations is a 1966 album by John Coltrane. The album was considered the "spiritual follow-up to A Love Supreme." It features Coltrane and Pharoah Sanders as soloists, both playing tenor saxophones. This was the last Coltrane recording to feature his classic quartet lineup of himself, bassist Jimmy Garrison, drummer Elvin Jones and pianist McCoy Tyner (augmented here as a sextet with Sanders and second drummer Rashied Ali), as both Jones and Tyner would quit the band by early 1966. Sanders, Ali, Garrison and Coltrane's wife Alice would comprise his next group.

Alternative versions of tracks 2–5 had been recorded in September 1965 by the same musicians minus Rashied Ali and Sanders. They were later issued as First Meditations (for quartet) in 1977.

== Track listing ==
All tracks are written by John Coltrane.

Side one

No.	Title	Length
1.	"The Father and the Son and the Holy Ghost"	12:51
2.	"Compassion"	6:50
Total length:		19:41

Side two

No.	Title	Length
1.	"Love"	8:09
2.	"Consequences"	9:11
3.	"Serenity"	3:28
Total length:		20:48 40:29

== Personnel ==
- John Coltrane – tenor saxophone, percussion, band leader
- Pharoah Sanders – tenor saxophone, percussion
- McCoy Tyner – piano
- Jimmy Garrison – double bass
- Elvin Jones – drums
- Rashied Ali – drums

== Charts ==
Chart performance for Meditations
Chart (2026)	Peak position
Swedish Jazz Albums (Sverigetopplistan)	19
