= Look for the Black Star =

Studio album by Dewey Redman
- Released: 1966
- Recorded: January 4, 1966
- Genre: Jazz
- Length: 45:24
- Label: Freedom Records (USA); Fontana Records (Netherlands, Japan)
- Producer: Alan Bates

Dewey Redman chronology
Look for the Black Star (1966)	Tarik (1969)

Freedom Records cover

Look for the Black Star is the debut album by American jazz saxophonist Dewey Redman featuring performances recorded in 1966 and originally released on the Dutch Fontana label but later released in the U.S. on the Freedom label in 1975.

== Reception ==
The Allmusic review by Scott Yanow awarded the album 4 stars stating "This early recording finds Redman discovering his own individual voice on five of his frequently emotional originals... this San Francisco date is quite adventurous and holds one's interest throughout".

Professional ratings
Review scores
Source	Rating
Allmusic	4/5 stars
The Rolling Stone Jazz Record Guide	3/5 stars

== Track listing ==
All compositions by Dewey Redman

1. "Look for the Black Star" - 15:41
2. "For Eldon" - 6:29
3. "Spur of the Moment" - 1:54
4. "Seven and One" - 13:22
5. "Of Love" - 7:58

- Recorded in San Francisco on January 4, 1966

== Personnel ==
- Dewey Redman - tenor saxophone
- Jim Young (also known as Jymm or Joachim Young) - piano
- Donald Garrett - bass, clarinet
- Eddie Moore - drums
