= A Love Supreme: Live in Seattle =

Live album by John Coltrane
- Released: October 22, 2021
- Recorded: October 2, 1965
- Venues: The Penthouse, Seattle, US
- Length: 75:28
- Label: Impulse!
- Producer: Ken Druker

John Coltrane chronology
Blue World (2019)	A Love Supreme: Live in Seattle (2021)	Evenings at the Village Gate: John Coltrane with Eric Dolphy (2023)

A Love Supreme: Live in Seattle is a live album by American saxophonist John Coltrane, released on October 22, 2021, through Impulse! Records. It was recorded on October 2, 1965, at the Seattle jazz club The Penthouse, by saxophonist Joe Brazil. The tapes were found five years after Brazil's death in October 2008 by the saxophonist Steve Griggs. It is one of only two recorded live performances of Coltrane's 1965 album A Love Supreme, the other being a July 1965 recording from the Jazz à Juan jazz festival in Juan-les-Pins, Antibes, France, which was released in 2002 as part of the deluxe edition of A Love Supreme.

== Background ==
During September 14–26, 1965, the John Coltrane Quartet played an engagement at the Jazz Workshop in San Francisco. The saxophonist Pharoah Sanders, whose music Coltrane admired, and who had previously recorded with Coltrane on Ascension, went to hear the group and was invited to sit in. According to Sanders, "[H]e told me then that he was thinking of changing the group and changing the music, to get different sounds. He asked me to play with him." At the same time, the multi-instrumentalist Donald Garrett, who had played with Coltrane's group in 1961 as a second bassist, was also asked to sit in. At the end of the two-week gig, both Sanders and Garrett were asked to join the band, and accompanied it to the next engagement, September 27–October 2, at the Penthouse in Seattle. On September 30, the group recorded the music heard on Live in Seattle (Impulse!, 1971) at the Penthouse, and on October 1, they recorded Om (Impulse!, 1968) at a separate location. They returned to the Penthouse the following day, where, with guest saxophonist Carlos Ward, they performed A Love Supreme.

== Critical reception ==
Professional ratings
Aggregate scores
Source	Rating
Metacritic	92/100
Review scores
Source	Rating
AllMusic	4/5 stars
The Australian	2/5 stars
Financial Times	4/5 stars
The Guardian	4/5 stars
Pitchfork	9.4/10
Rolling Stone	4/5 stars
The Telegraph	5/5 stars

On review aggregator Metacritic, the album has a score of 92 out of 100 from nine critics' reviews, indicating "universal acclaim". A review in Relix calls this recording "a 75-minute journey through free-jazz heaven". Pitchfork describes the members of the quartet individually-Jones as "both deeply complex and also strikingly coherent", Sanders' "[H]e delivers a flurry of smeared tones and growls—he sounds possessed" and mostly importantly Coltrane-"[H]e’s overblowing with an energy far beyond that of the studio recording, and sometimes it sounds as though his horn might break apart" describing his solo in 'Acknowledgment'.

== Track listing ==
All tracks are written by John Coltrane.

Apart from the four tracks on disc 1 of the deluxe edition ("Acknowledgment", "Resolution", "Pursuance", "Psalm"), the live album includes four live interludes spanning more than double the time of the original.
No.	Title	Length
1.	"A Love Supreme, Pt. 1 – Acknowledgement"	21:53
2.	"Interlude 1"	2:28
3.	"A Love Supreme, Pt. 2 – Resolution"	11:05
4.	"Interlude 2"	6:23
5.	"A Love Supreme, Pt. 3 – Pursuance"	15:27
6.	"Interlude 3"	6:31
7.	"Interlude 4"	4:20
8.	"A Love Supreme, Pt. 4 – Psalm"	7:21
Total length:		75:28

== Personnel ==
=== The John Coltrane Quartet ===
- John Coltrane – tenor saxophone, percussion
- Jimmy Garrison – double bass
- Elvin Jones – drums
- McCoy Tyner – piano

=== Additional personnel ===
- Carlos Ward – alto saxophone
- Pharoah Sanders – tenor saxophone, percussion
- Donald Garrett – double bass
- Joe Brazil – recording

== Charts ==
Chart performance for A Love Supreme: Live in Seattle
Chart (2021)	Peak position
Austrian Albums (Ö3 Austria)	25
Belgian Albums (Ultratop Flanders)	23
Belgian Albums (Ultratop Wallonia)	17
Dutch Albums (Album Top 100)	39
German Albums (Offizielle Top 100)	20
Italian Albums (FIMI)	54
Japan Hot Albums (Billboard Japan)	50
Japanese Albums (Oricon)	30
Portuguese Albums (AFP)	31
Scottish Albums (Official Charts)	16
Swiss Albums (Schweizer Hitparade)	13
UK Albums (Official Charts)	83
US Billboard 200	78
US Top Jazz Albums (Billboard)	1
