= Live at Okuden (2016 album) =

Live album by Mat Walerian, Matthew Shipp, Hamid Drake
- Released: April 2016
- Recorded: November 19, 2012
- Venue: Okuden Music Concert Series, Toruń, Poland
- Genre: Jazz
- Label: ESP-Disk (5009)
- Producer: Steve Holtje

Mat Walerian chronology
The Uppercut Live at Okuden (2015)	Live at Okuden (2016)	This Is Beautiful Because We Are Beautiful People (2017)

Live at Okuden is a live double studio album by avant-garde jazz trio Jungle, featuring alto saxophonist Mat Walerian, pianist Matthew Shipp and drummer Hamid Drake. It was recorded in 2012 at the Okuden Music Concert Series, and was released in 2016 on the Brooklyn-based avant-garde record label ESP-Disk'.

In the album liner notes, William Parker wrote: "It's all about playing free instead of asking others for freedom, so I celebrate Drake, Shipp, and Walerian for choosing life over music. Choosing intuition over tradition."

== Reception ==
Professional ratings
Review scores
Source	Rating
AllMusic	4/5 stars
All About Jazz	4/5 stars
All About Jazz	3.5/5 stars

In a review for AllMusic, Thom Jurek wrote: "The music ranges from free-flowing avant, modal, post-bop to folk and chamber-influenced jazz, with plenty of soloing from all players... Walerian's tone, inventive phrasing, and keen sense of how and when to mix and match musical traditions, is well-suited to the always adventurous, genre-blurring playing and improvising of his partners."

Steve Greenlee of JazzTimes stated that the 13 tracks "both soothe the soul and make the heart race," and noted that Walerian has "obviously been studying Ware, Coltrane and their ilk, and while it's too soon to make any grand proclamations, he's on his way to becoming a free-jazz force."

Writing for All About Jazz, Mark Corroto remarked: "the mood ranges between the earnestly somber to fervently frenetic. The difficult task is to choose the highlights. There are so many." AAJ's John Sharpe stated that Walerian's compositions resemble "free extemporizations based around tuneful fragments," and noted that "they don't constrain either Shipp or Drake, although both are notably sensitive to the leader's trajectory in their accompaniment."

The Big Takeover's Chuck Foster remarked: "this performance... finds the musicians in a perfect fluid zen where music arises purely from air, space and inspiration... Together, the trio builds a city of sound, hot and bustling at times, yet cool and peaceful when no one is looking."

In an article for Jazz Right Now, Cisco Bradley wrote: "The music on this double disc is infused with a deeply spiritual and meditative air. The dramatic and intuitive performances alternate between fury and quiet intensity... Calm and meditative one moment, ecstatic and free the next, Live at Okuden is a strong and impressive offering from three experienced veterans."

Doug Ramsey of Rifftides stated: "Walerian ultimately projects a calming effect not often found in avant garde music... The album has no visual aspect except in the mind of the listener. If that mind is open, it may take the advice expressed in the title of the last track, 'Sit Back, Relax and Watch'."

== Track listing ==
CD 1

1. "Shrine" (Mat Walerian) - 3:58
2. "Teleport" (Mat Walerian) - 5:37
3. "Gentle Giants" (Mat Walerian) - 4:56
4. "123 Sylvester 230 CE" (Mat Walerian)
5. "Ultimate Insurance" (Matthew Shipp, Hamid Drake) - 8:03
6. "Good Trip Is a Safe Trip" (Mat Walerian) - 6:19
7. "Perfect Joint" (Mat Walerian, Matthew Shipp) - 8:30
8. "Watch Your Path" (Mat Walerian, Matthew Shipp, Hamid Drake) 5:37

CD 2

1. "Gate" (Mat Walerian) - 9:45
2. "One for" (Traditional) - 11:12
3. "Coach on da Mic" (Mat Walerian, Matthew Shipp, Hamid Drake) - 18:25
4. "Tiger" (Mat Walerian) - 4:19
5. "Sit Back, Relax and Watch" (Mat Walerian) - 4:57

== Personnel ==
- Mat Walerian - alto saxophone, bass clarinet, soprano clarinet, flute
- Matthew Shipp - piano
- Hamid Drake - drums
