= The Cat in the Bag =

The Cat in the Bag may refer to:

- The Cat in the Bag (1964 film), a drama film by Gilles Groulx
- The Cat in the Bag (1935 film), a French-German comedy film

== See also ==
- Letting the cat out of the bag, a colloquialism that means to reveal facts previously hidden
- Cat's in the Bag..., an episode of the American television series Breaking Bad
