= Guernsey's =

Auction house based in New York City

- Founded: 1975
- Founders: Arlan Ettinger, Barbara Mintz
- Headquarters: New York City
- Website: www.guernseys.com

Guernsey's is an auction house founded by Arlan Ettinger and Barbara Mintz and based in New York City.

== History ==
Guernsey's was founded by New York City advertising executives Arlan Ettinger and Barbara Mintz in 1975. It specializes in collecting obscure items.

== Notable auctions ==
Over the decades, Guernsey's has held a series of auctions involving items closely associated with significant cultural figures and moments. In 2011 the company auctioned Elvis Presley's first guitar and Michael Jackson's moonwalking self-portrait. In 2017, it auctioned Jerry Garcia's guitar called "Wolf" for the second time, having auctioned it to the seller in an earlier auction in 2002.

The company has also auctioned Keith Haring's refrigerator in 2021, and personal artifacts from various influential figures including Madonna, Jean-Michel Basquiat, Patti Astor, and Bob Dylan in 2024. The 2024 auction also featured original fixtures from the Chelsea Hotel, including its iconic neon sign.

In 2024, Guernsey's scheduled an auction of approximately 70 personal effects of Nelson Mandela, including his identity document, hearing aids, and trademark Madiba shirts. The auction was co-organized with Mandela’s daughter, Makaziwe Mandela, who stated that proceeds would fund a memorial garden in Qunu. However, the sale became the subject of a high-profile legal and ethical dispute, as South African heritage authorities and segments of the public objected to the export and sale of items they considered national patrimony. Although a South African court ruled in favor of allowing the sale, ongoing appeals and public controversy led Guernsey’s to suspend the auction.
