= Ingrid Monson =

Jazz scholar

- Title: Quincy Jones Professor of African-American Music

Academic work
- Discipline: Ethnomusicologist
- Sub-discipline: African-American music
- Institutions: Harvard University

Ingrid Monson is Quincy Jones Professor of African-American Music, supported by the Time Warner Endowment, and Professor of African and African American studies at Harvard University.

== Education ==
Monson earned a Bachelor of Music from New England Conservatory of Music and a Bachelor of Arts from the University of Wisconsin-Madison, where she studied economics. She later earned an M.A. and Ph.D. in musicology from New York University.

== Career ==
=== At Harvard ===
Monson was appointed as the Quincy Jones Professor of African-American Music in 2001. Monson served as the chair of Harvard's Department of Music from 2005 to 2008 as well as serving as the Interim Dean of Arts and Humanities from 2010 to 2011. She is currently a full professor of African American Studies.

=== Awards ===
For her 1996 book, Saying Something: Jazz Improvisation and Interaction, Monson won the Irving Lowens Book Award of the Society for American Music.

In 2008, Monson won the Woody Guthrie Award of the International Association for the Study of Popular Music. for her book Freedom Sounds: Civil Rights Call Out to Jazz and Africa. The award is given for "the most outstanding book that is an author’s first monograph."

== Reception ==
In February 2022, Monson was one of 38 Harvard faculty to sign a letter to the Harvard Crimson defending Professor John Comaroff, who had been found to have violated the university's sexual and professional conduct policies. The letter defended Comaroff as "an excellent colleague, advisor and committed university citizen" and expressed dismay over his being sanctioned by the university. After students filed a lawsuit with detailed allegations of Comaroff's actions and the university's failure to respond, Monson was one of several signatories to say that she wished to retract her signature.

== Works ==
- Saying Something: Jazz Improvisation and Interaction (University of Chicago Press, 1996)
- Freedom Sounds: Civil Rights Call Out to Jazz and Africa (Oxford University Press, 2007)
- ed. African Diaspora: A Musical Perspective (Garland/Routledge, 2000)
