= Donald Garrett =

American jazz musician (1932–1989)

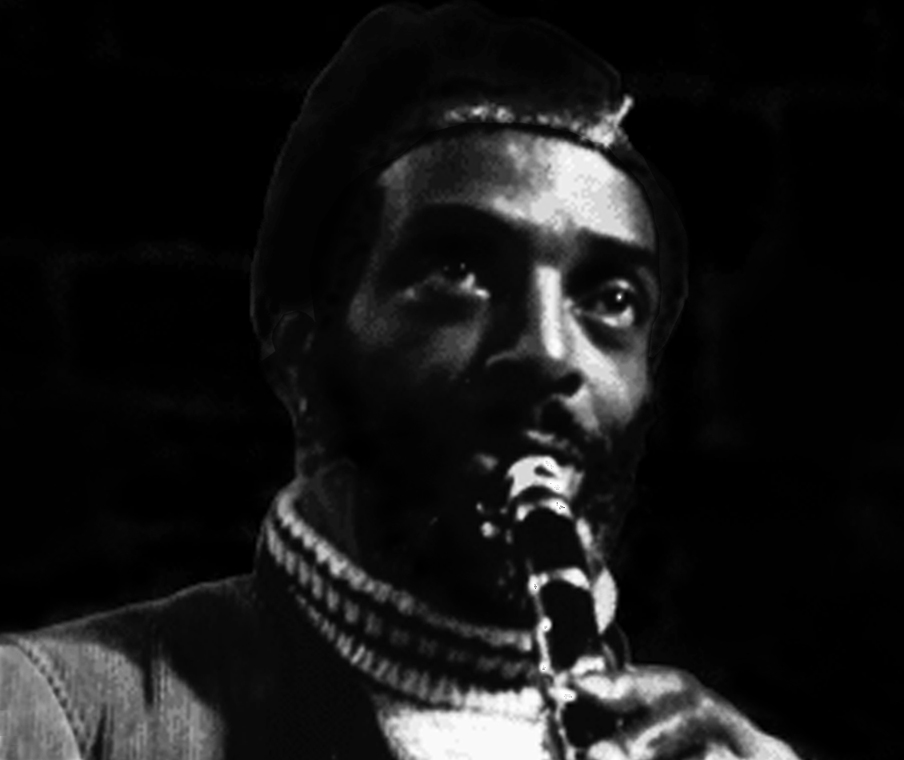
Donald Rafael Garrett

Donald Rafael Garrett (February 28, 1932, El Dorado, Arkansas – August 14, 1989, Champaign, Illinois) was an American jazz multi-instrumentalist who played double-bass, clarinet, and flute.

== Biography ==
Garrett, who preferred to be called Rafael, was raised in Chicago, where, along with musicians like John Gilmore and Clifford Jordan, he attended DuSable High School, studying music with "Captain" Walter Dyett. He initially started playing clarinet and saxophone, but later began studying bass after meeting Wilbur Ware. Around 1951, he met Muhal Richard Abrams, who credited Garrett with being a major influence on the direction that music in Chicago would take. In 1955, Garrett met John Coltrane while the latter was touring with Miles Davis. Garrett later told an interviewer that he and Coltrane had "been friends since 1955, and whenever he is in town, he comes over to my house, and we go over ideas." (One idea that originated with Garrett, and that Coltrane liked, was that of using two bass players. Coltrane frequently employed two bassists in the early 1960s.) Garrett also introduced Coltrane and Abrams at around this time.

Garrett worked as a bassist with Ira Sullivan from 1960 to 1962, recording Bird Lives!, and also played with Rahsaan Roland Kirk, recording Introducing Roland Kirk, and Eddie Harris, recording Jazz for "Breakfast at Tiffany's" and A Study in Jazz. During this time, Garrett also performed with the Ira Sullivan-Rahsaan Roland Kirk Quintet, which featured Abrams on piano, as well as in a trio with Abrams and drummer Steve McCall. In 1961, he played as a second bassist with Coltrane's group alongside Reggie Workman while the group was performing in Chicago. That same year, he was one of the co-founders, with Abrams, of the Experimental Band, a forerunner of the AACM.

In 1964, Garrett moved to San Francisco, where he taught, organized concerts, and began making instruments. In September 1965, he reunited with his friend John Coltrane, whose quartet was playing at the Jazz Workshop. Garrett and saxophonist Pharoah Sanders were both invited to sit in, and then joined the band, accompanying it to Seattle, where the group performed at The Penthouse and recorded Live in Seattle followed by Om. The group then traveled to Los Angeles, where they recorded the tracks "Kulu Sé Mama (Juno Sé Mama)", first issued on the album Kulu Sé Mama, and "Selflessness", first issued on the album Selflessness: Featuring My Favorite Things.

The following year, Garrett recorded with Dewey Redman (Look for the Black Star) and Archie Shepp (Archie Shepp Live in San Francisco and Three for a Quarter One for a Dime). He also played with Andrew Hill, Sam Rivers, and Leon Thomas while in California. In the early 1970s, he went to Paris, where he performed with Frank Wright and Jean-Luc Ponty. In the late 1970s, he met cellist Zusaan Kali Fasteau, whom he would later marry, and together they formed the Sea Ensemble. The group recorded three albums and toured widely, visiting countries in Asia, North Africa, and Europe. During this time, Garrett played a number of non-Western instruments, including bamboo flutes that he made. In the 1980s Garrett also recorded with Joseph Jarman (Earth Passage – Density) and Kahil El'Zabar's Ritual Trio (Sacred Love). He died on August 14, 1989, in Champaign, Illinois.

Over the years, in various album credits, books and articles, Garrett has been represented as having played bass clarinet. However, the authors of The John Coltrane Reference, who occasionally present updates to the book on their website (http://wildmusic-jazz.com/jcr_index.htm), provided an update dated 2008 which states that Dutch musician Cornelis Hazevoet sent the following information via an email to author Yasuhiro Fujioka: "Over the years, in liners, books and lists, Don Garrett has been attributed with playing bass clarinet. This is wrong. The man only played bass and clarinet (the small and straight horn, that is)... In 1975, Garrett played in my band and I've specifically asked him about it (because I already felt something was wrong with it). He most specifically and pertinently told me that he never played bass clarinet in his entire life, only the small, straight horn (which he played in my band too)... Perhaps, the error originated from the fact that Garrett was listed somewhere as playing 'bass, clarinet', which subsequently evolved into 'bass clarinet'. Whatever is the case, Garrett did not play bass clarinet on any Coltrane record nor anywhere else."

== Discography ==
With John Coltrane

- Kulu Sé Mama (1967)
- Om (1968)
- Selflessness: Featuring My Favorite Things (1969)
- Live in Seattle (1971)
- The Major Works of John Coltrane (1992)
- A Love Supreme: Live in Seattle (2021)

With Kahil El'Zabar's Ritual Trio

- Sacred Love (1985)

With Kali Fasteau

- Memoirs Of A Dream (2000)

With Dexter Gordon

- Jive Fernando (1981)

With Eddie Harris

- Jazz for "Breakfast at Tiffany's" (1961)
- A Study in Jazz (1962)

With Joseph Jarman

- Earth Passage – Density (1981)

With The Jazz Doctors (Billy Bang, Frank Lowe, Dennis Charles)

- Intensive Care (1983)

With Rahsaan Roland Kirk

- Introducing Roland Kirk (1960)

With Dewey Redman

- Look for the Black Star (1966)

With The Sea Ensemble

- We Move Together (1974)
- After Nature (1977)
- Manzara (1977)

With Paul Serrano

- Blues Holiday (1961)

With Archie Shepp

- Archie Shepp Live in San Francisco (1966)
- Three for a Quarter One for a Dime (1966)
- Live At The Festival (one track) (1994)

With Ira Sullivan

- Bird Lives! (1963)
