= Jim Wilke =

American radio host

Jim Wilke is a radio host and producer in Seattle, Washington. In 1988 he began hosting Jazz Northwest from the public radio station KNKX in Seattle. From 1984 to 2014, he hosted the syndicated radio program Jazz After Hours.

== Career ==
Wilke grew up in New London, Iowa and graduated from the University of Iowa in 1959. At school he played saxophone in a jazz band. He moved to Seattle and started at KING-FM in 1961. He produced Showcase of the Lively Arts with Don Shannon. In 1962 The Penthouse jazz club opened with a phone line from the club to KING-FM. Wilke set up a mixing board near the piano and four microphones on stage. Ernestine Anderson was the first singer to be broadcast.

Wilke taught jazz history at Cornish College of the Arts from 1975–2002. He taught radio broadcasting at Bellevue Community College on their station KBCS-FM from 1977–1983. From 1978–1993, he worked for the Bellevue Parks and Community Service, coordinating music festivals and outdoor concerts. During 1981–2001 he worked at KUOW-FM. In 1985 he started the recording studio Hatchcover, the production company responsible for Jazz Northwest.

He records at the Seattle Art Museum for the Earshot Jazz Art of Jazz program. Note that this program was ended approx. late 2019.

Wilke has announced his retirement from the broadcasting industry as of 24-Aug-2023.

Wilke has worked with jazz record labels to release recordings he made in the early 1960s. These include music by Johnny Griffin, Eddie "Lockjaw" Davis, Wes Montgomery, Cannonball Adderley.

== Awards and honors ==
- Seattle Jazz Hall of Fame
