= Lewis Porter =

American jazz musician

Lewis Robert Porter (born May 14, 1951) is an American jazz pianist, composer, author, and educator.

== Education and career ==
Porter was born in Scranton, Pennsylvania, but raised primarily in the Bronx in New York City. Porter decided at age 10 that he wanted to be a musician, and took violin lessons from about age 10 to 12, then taught himself at the family's upright piano, eventually taking some lessons in college and afterward. Porter earned a Bachelor of Arts in Psychology from the University of Rochester in 1972, and, while there, studied music at Eastman. He went on to earn a Master of Education in Counseling from Northeastern University in 1976, followed by a master's degree in Music Theory from Tufts University in 1979, under T. J. Anderson, his primary mentor. In 1983, Porter received his Ph.D. in Musicology from Brandeis University, where he studied under Joshua Rifkin.

He first taught at Tufts University, jazz history, part-time, starting in January 1977. (This led to his being mentored by Anderson.) In 1982 he became a full-time tenure track music professor at Tufts, and he also taught part-time at Brandeis from 1979 through about 1984. In 1986, he became a Professor of Music at Rutgers University, where in September 1997 he founded the world's first jazz history program, the Master's Program in Jazz History and Research, which he directed until his retirement from Rutgers in January 2018. During the Rutgers years, he also taught at The New School, Manhattan School of Music, NYU, William Paterson University, and Jazz at Lincoln Center.

Porter has performed as a jazz pianist since his college days, and worked during his Boston years (1974–86) with Alan Dawson, Herb Pomeroy, George Garzone and others. (He also played alto saxophone during those years, but gave it up around 1994 due to lack of time to practice it in addition to the piano.)

His performs on piano and synthesizer, with many artists, across the USA and Europe. His 2018 album Beauty & Mystery featured Terri Lyne Carrington, John Patitucci and Tia Fuller. He has appeared with them in concert, and has also played with Dave Liebman, Jerry Bergonzi, Bela Fleck, Don Byron, Dave King, two pianos with Vijay Iyer, two pianos with Ethan Iverson, and many others. He has appeared on about 42 albums (as of November 2026) as a sideperson, co-leader, or as a leader. Among the latter are Second Voyage with Dan Faulk and Dave Liebman (2002) and Italian Encounter with Furio DiCastri "live" for the Siena Jazz Festival (2007), on the Altrisuoni label, and Trio/Solo with Joris Teepe and Rudy Royston (Unseen Rain label, 2017) and among those as co-leader, Surreality with Dave Liebman and Marc Ribot (Enja), Transformation (keyboard duets with Marc Rossi/Altrisuoni label) and Just Four (as a member of the India/Jazz group Dharma Jazz with Badal Roy and Freddie Bryant). His album Solo Piano was released in March 2019 on the label Next To Silence.

Porter is also a composer, writing many short pieces for small groups as well as several big band pieces, and longer pieces such as "Movements" for string quartet and piano trio (premiered by his friend pianist Don Friedman), a concerto for jazz saxophone and orchestra (premiered by Dave Liebman), and a concerto for classical soprano saxophone and wind ensemble (premiered by Paul Cohen), among others. He remains active in teaching, as a guest teacher at colleges across the USA and Europe, and as a private teacher in person and by Skype.

== Writings ==
Porter is author of many books and articles. He is best known for his acclaimed biography of saxophonist John Coltrane, published in 1998 in English, in French and Italian in 2007, and in Russian and Hungarian. Entitled John Coltrane: His Life and Music (University of Michigan Press), the book has been endorsed by Coltrane's son Ravi Coltrane, Dan Morgenstern, Jimmy Heath, and Dave Liebman, among others.

His other books include Jazz: A Century of Change, Jazz From Its Origins to the Present (coauthored with Michael Ullman and Ed Hazell), The Lester Young Reader, and Lester Young. He was also editor of The John Coltrane Reference, and assisting author of Dave Liebman's memoir, What It Is.

From 2002 through 2012, Porter was the editor of the jazz book series Jazz Perspectives at the University of Michigan Press. In 2007 he founded, with his friend and colleague John Howland, a journal, also called Jazz Perspectives.

Among many other projects, he was the founding editor of an online Encyclopedia of Jazz Musicians.

Since September 2022 he has posted an essay every week presenting previously unknown jazz research or recordings on Substack.

He frequently appears as a guest on NPR, WNYC, BBC and WBGO, as well as on visual media such as BET and documentary films such as Chasing Trane, among others. He is also quoted in various printed media, including The New York Times and The Ledger upon others. He has been the subject of articles in the jazz magazines DownBeat and Jazz Times, as well as numerous reviews of his recordings and publications.
