= Live at Okuden (2015 album) =

Live album by Matthew Shipp & Mat Walerian
- Released: 2015
- Recorded: May 15, 2012; Okuden Music, Torun
- Genre: Jazz
- Length: 67:27
- Label: ESP-Disk'
- Producer: Bernard Stollman

Live at Okuden is a studio album by avant-garde jazz duet "The Uppercut : Matthew Shipp Mat Walerian duo" featuring pianist Matthew Shipp and alto saxophonist Mat Walerian, which was recorded live in 2012 at the Okuden Music concert series and released in 2015 on the New York City, Brooklyn based avant-garde record label ESP-Disk'.

== Liner notes by William Parker ==
"For the past 30 years Matthew Shipp has kept his music and musical associations true to himself and the higher laws of the universe. He has done this by having the courage play uncompromising music, unafraid to bring us tears and flowers wrapped up in the blues. Not intimidated by jazz history, Matthew has spent his life learning how feel comfortable stepping into the unknown part of the tone world.

In this new CD Matthew appears with Mat Walerian, whose playing reminds me of the Japanese paintings of Sesshu, full of fine lines, images, and sounds that tell haiku-like stories, arresting and mysterious. As the music progresses from clarinets to alto sax to flute, you can hear sound and space disrobe to reveal villages with beautiful clouds over trees laced with seraphic hues and birds dancing. The musicians are never concerned about style or genre. What do I call this music ? One word comes to mind : “Exquisite.”

Throughout his musical career, Shipp has been able to accomplish a rare thing. That is to be able to find the center in the music every time he plays. This music is more concerned with poetics because it is poetics, not technique or academics, that will allow the music to go inside and change the soul of the listener. It is transcendence of music that will lead us to transcendence. I enjoyed this music on many levels; the more I listen to it, the more layers of brilliance I discover. So remember, give it repeated listening; accept it for what it is, not for what it is not.

Mat Walerian plays some of most lovely and relaxed uncompromised beauty that I have ever heard in a long time. Now some might ask, who is this saxophone player ? Who has he studied with, where does he come from ? I say accept him, he loves music and has risen to his apex in this duet with Matthew Shipp. The most important thing is not who he studied with, the most important thing is that he is alive on the scene. Mat Walerian is one of the special ones, and along with Matthew Shipp they have created a new music called Elusive Beauty. I invite you to enjoy it and learn how to cherish life." - William Parker

== Track listing ==
1. "Introduction" (Mat Walerian) – 5:44
2. "Blues For Acid Cold" (Mat Walerian) – 7:18
3. "Jungle Meditation" (Matthew Shipp, Mat Walerian) – 2:19
4. "Free Bop Statement One" (Matthew Shipp, Mat Walerian) – 2:37
5. "Free Bop Statement Two" (Matthew Shipp, Mat Walerian) – 5:46
6. "It's Sick Out There" (Mat Walerian) – 7:47
7. "Love And The Other Species" (Mat Walerian) – 7:55
8. "Peace And Respect" (Mat Walerian) – 6:06
9. "Black Rain" (Mat Walerian) – 16:19
10. "Encore" (Matthew Shipp, Mat Walerian) – 5:30

== Personnel ==
- Mat Walerian - alto saxophone, bass clarinet, soprano clarinet, flute
- Matthew Shipp - piano
