= Joe Brazil =

American jazz saxophonist and educator

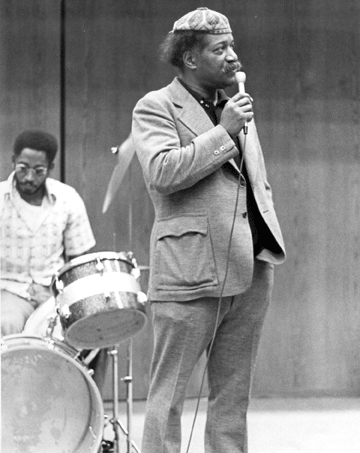
Joe Brazil

Joseph Brazil (August 25, 1927 – August 6, 2008) was an American jazz saxophonist and educator. Local musicians and touring acts performed in his basement. He taught jazz at Garfield High School, co-founded the Black Music curriculum at the University of Washington, and founded the Black Academy of Music in Seattle. He appeared on the albums Om by John Coltrane and Mystic Voyage by Roy Ayers.

== Biography ==
=== Detroit (1927–1961) ===
Joseph Brazil was born August 25, 1927, in Detroit, Michigan. In 1951 he purchased a home in Detroit where he lived with his brother and mother. He built a bar in the basement and installed a baby grand piano. Jam sessions took place in his basement, with musicians such as trumpeter Donald Byrd, saxophonists Sonny Red and Brazil, pianist Barry Harris, bassist Doug Watkins, and drummer Frank Gant. Tapes of saxophonist John Coltrane practicing were made at his house. A tape of a jam session was recorded in his basement on September 25, 1958, with trumpeter Donald Towns, saxophonists Coltrane, Joe Henderson, Brazil, Red, pianist Hugh Lawson, bassist Ernie Farrow, and drummer Roy Brooks. Euphonium player Kiane Zawadi (Bernard McKinney) and saxophonist Kenneth Winfrey lived down the street and often played at his house. Coltrane met drummer George Goldsmith in his basement and once asked Goldsmith to substitute for drummer Elvin Jones. While living in Detroit, pianist Alice Coltrane (then Alice McLeod) was also a regular: pianist Kenny Cox suggests that it was here that she met her second husband, John Coltrane, although their formal introduction occurred in New York.

=== Seattle (1961–2008) ===
Brazil moved to Seattle to work as a tool maker at Boeing in 1961. In September 1965, he performed with John Coltrane at The Penthouse and, on October 1 of that year, recorded on flute with Coltrane in Lynnwood, Washington. The music was released by Impulse! Records in 1968 as the album Om. The following day, after performing with his own band, Brazil taped Coltrane's band on reel-to-reel using The Penthouse's house system. The tapes sat in Brazil's basement for decades until, five years after Brazil's death, they were found by local saxophonist Steve Griggs. These recordings were released by Impulse! in 2021 as A Love Supreme: Live in Seattle.

He taught at Garfield High School's Magnet Program with bassist Chuck Metcalf in 1968. He established the Black Academy of Music in 1967 with guitarist George Hurst. The faculty included trumpeter Floyd Standifer, saxophonist Jabo Ward, and bassist Milt Garred. The Black Student Union demanded that he be hired by the University of Washington School of Music. He taught at the University of Washington from 1969 to 1976 but was denied tenure.

== Discography ==
=== As sideman ===
With Roy Ayers

- Mystic Voyage (Polydor, 1975)

With John Coltrane

- Om (Impulse!, 1968)

With James Moody

- Teachers (Perception, 1970)

== Sources ==
- Armbuster, Kurt (2011). Before Seattle Rocked: A City and Its Music. Seattle, Washington: University of Washington Press. pp. 264–265. ISBN 978-0-295-99113-9
- Berkman, Franya (2010). Monument Eternal: The Music of Alice Coltrane. Middletown, Connecticut. Wesleyan University Press. p. 35. ISBN 978-0-8195-6925-7.
- Cole, Bill (1976). John Coltrane. New York, New York: Da Capo Press. p. 169, 180. ISBN 0-306-80530-8.
- de Barros, Paul (1993). Jackson Street After Hours: The Roots of Jazz in Seattle. Seattle, Washington: Sasquatch Books. p. 203. ISBN 0-912365-92-7.
- Kahn, Ashley (2002). A Love Supreme: The Story of John Coltrane's Signature Album. Middlesex, England: Viking Penguin. p. 179. ISBN 0-670-03136-4.
- Kahn, Ashley (2006). The House that Trane Built: The Story of Impulse Records. New York, New York: W. W. Norton & Company, Inc. p. 184. ISBN 978-0-393-05879-6.
- Porter, Lewis (January 28, 2000). John Coltrane: His Life and Music. Ann Arbor, Michigan: University of Michigan Press. pp. 180, 265, 266. ISBN 978-0472086436.
- Ratliff, Ben (2007). Coltrane: The Story of a Sound. New York, New York: Farrar, Straus and Giroux. p. 102. ISBN 978-0-374-12606-3.
- Robinson, Marc. "The Early History of the UW Black Student Union" Seattle Civil Rights and Labor History Project.
- Simpkins, C. O. (1975). Coltrane: A Biography. Baltimore, Maryland: Black Classic Press. p. 194. ISBN 0933121-20-2.
