= Cornelis Hazevoet =

- Born: 15 March 1948 (age 78); Amsterdam, Netherlands

Academic background
- Education: University of Amsterdam (PhD)

Academic work
- Discipline: Biologist
- Sub-discipline: Ornithology
- Institutions: University of Lisbon
- Musical career
- Genre: Free jazz
- Instruments: Piano, clarinet, trumpet
- Years active: 1963–1980

Cornelis Jan "Kees" Hazevoet (born 15 March 1948) is a Dutch ornithologist and former professional jazz musician. He played piano, clarinet, and sometimes trumpet during his musical career, during which he was among the leading figures in the introduction of free jazz to the Netherlands. He is now curator of birds at the University of Lisbon's natural history museum, and an expert on the birds and other fauna of Cape Verde.

== Early life ==
Hazevoet was born in Amsterdam. His family and especially his mother had an interest in music; his parents kept classic jazz records, and got him started playing piano at a young age. He also had an interest in nature and biology from an early age. As a teenager he grew more interested in jazz, started playing trumpet and then clarinet, and attended workshops run by Theo Loevendie. At the time, many of his inspirations were jazz drummers, including Art Blakey. He went to school with bassist Arjen Gorter, who would collaborate with him again after they became professionals. Hazevoet hoped to enter a conservatory, but failed to be admitted.

== Musical career ==
Hazevoet started playing jazz in 1963, and in 1965 began to play free jazz, due in particular to the influence of the American avant-garde jazz pioneer Albert Ayler. During the 1960s, he was among the most prominent of the musicians who introduced free jazz to the Netherlands. He was a member of one of bandleader Willem Breuker's first groups in 1966, and played on Breuker's debut album. Hazevoet began a career as a professional jazz musician, playing with among others the group For Adolphe Sax led by saxophonist Peter Brötzmann. His collaboration with Han Bennink was one of his most important, beginning in 1967 and lasted until 1980. In 1970, he formed a quartet with Arjen Gorter, the saxophonist Kris Wanders, and the South African drummer Louis Moholo, and that year they released the album Pleasure. Around 1975, this group expanded into a septet, including Evan Parker and Maarten van Regteren Altena. In 1976, he formed the new group "Haazz & Company", with Moholo, Bennink, Brötzmann, and Johnny Dyani, and released Unlawful Noise.

In 1970, he became secretary of the Foundation Jazz in Nederland, a Dutch jazz organisation. In 1972, Hazevoet received the VPRO/Boy Edgar Award, considered the most prestigious jazz award in the Netherlands. He was also one of the founders of the Amsterdam jazz club Bimhuis in 1973.

While other pioneers of the Dutch free jazz scene have become well known in the Netherlands and abroad, including Misha Mengelberg, Han Bennink and Willem Breuker, Hazevoet had mostly been forgotten as a musician. This was largely because so few of his records were sold during his career. Pleasure, for example, only had 250 copies issued. In 2004, this album and Unlawful Noise were reissued by Atavistic Records as part of its "Unheard Music Series", bringing it and Hazevoet himself back into attention. Writing on All About Jazz in 2004, Andrey Henkin said the album had acquired a reputation as a mythical record which one would be privileged to hear, and described it as a work that stood out from the other recordings of the period but that perhaps did not deserve its reputation. Henkin compared Hazevoet to the famous American saxophonist Marzette Watts, saying they both "came and went in jazz relatively quickly" and worked with other musicians who had much longer careers.

Hazevoet said in the 1970s that his inspiration came from "the unromantic character of nature", and he called the creation of music a "natural event". Reviewing Pleasure in 2005, Belgian music site Kwadratuur said his clarinet playing together with Wanders' saxophone provided a tranquil atmosphere and "explored the limits of harmonics", complementing the tension provided by the other musicians, and his own piano performance, which they described as "almost furious" and key to the wild improvisation of the quartet.

== Scientific career ==
In 1980, Hazevoet gave up his jazz career, because he was tiring of work as a professional musician and "had enough of the music scene" by the late 1970s. As he later told an interviewer, he "always had a kind of scientific mind and approach to music", and he started a career as a zoologist, studying birds and the fauna of the Atlantic in particular. He travelled to northern Africa during the early 1980s, with an interest in both the wildlife and the local music. In 1986, he first visited Cape Verde, an archipelago nation in the Atlantic, and a few years later began graduate studies at the University of Amsterdam, earning a PhD in 1996.

In 1998 he accepted a position at the University of Lisbon in Portugal and became curator of birds at the school's Natural History Museum. Most of his research has been evolutionary and biogeographical, on spatial diversification over geologic time. Hazevoet has become renowned as an expert on the birds of Cape Verde, and published Birds of the Cape Verde Islands in 1995, among a number of other books. He served as editor of the journal Atlantic Seabirds (later Seabird), published by the Seabird Group, a British ornithological organisation dedicated to the study of seabirds. In addition to ornithology, he is also active in cetology, and coauthored the review article "Whales and Dolphins of the Cape Verde Islands", published in Contributions to Zoology in 2000.

== Personal life ==
Hazevoet is married and has a daughter. He and his family live in Lisbon most of the year, and in São Vicente, Cape Verde for another part of the year. While he mostly has stopped playing music, he wrote a biography of saxophonist Don Byas (whom he knew during the 1960s) in 2010–2011.
