= The Penthouse (Seattle) =

Jazz club in Seattle (1962–1968)

Coordinates: 47.602723°N 122.334786°W

- Interactive map of The Penthouse
- Address: United States

Construction
- Opened: 1963
- Closed: 1968
- Demolished: 1968

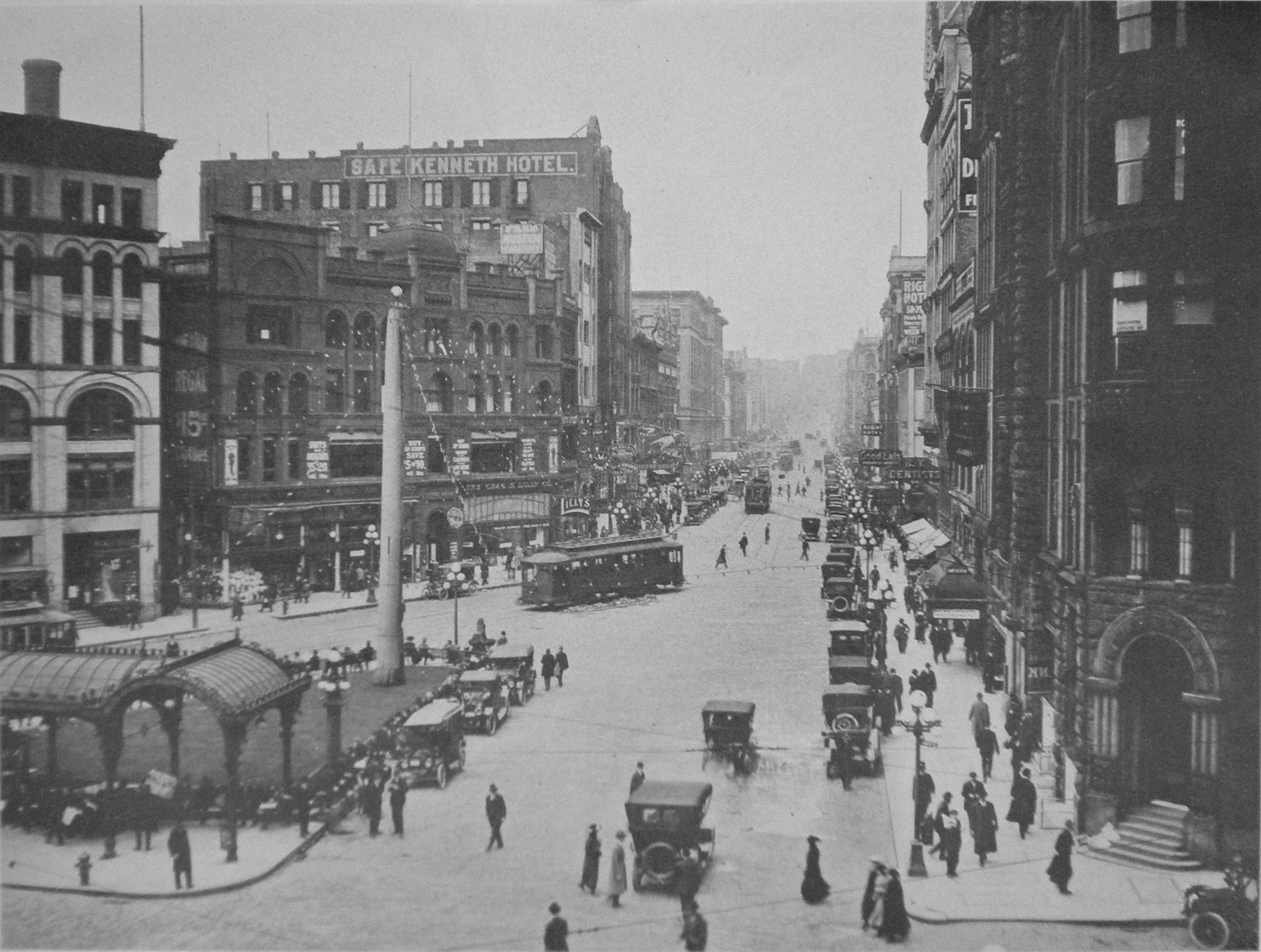
This 1916 photo of First Avenue in Seattle shows the Kenneth Hotel just left of center; the building is now replaced by multi-story parking lot.

The Penthouse was a jazz club in Seattle, most remembered for John Coltrane's performance there in September 1965.

The Penthouse opened in 1962 in Seattle's Pioneer Square neighborhood, founded by Charlie Puzzo. Over the next seven years, Puzzo presented such artists as Miles Davis, Bill Evans, The Montgomery Brothers, Stan Getz, Anita O’Day, Bill Cosby, Little Richard and Aretha Franklin. The club was on the ground floor of the Kenneth Hotel at 701 First Avenue, near the corner of Cherry Street, a building originally built as the Safe Deposit Building after the Great Seattle Fire of 1889, replacing the 1884 Merchant’s National Bank Building on the same site. Jim Wilke hosted Thursday night broadcasts from the club for KING radio.

The saxophonist John Coltrane performed at the club September 30, 1965, with a sextet consisting of Coltrane on tenor and soprano saxophones, Pharoah Sanders on tenor saxophone, Donald Garrett on clarinet and double bass, McCoy Tyner on piano, Jimmy Garrison on double bass and Elvin Jones on drums. They were also joined on Afro-Blue by Joe Brazil and Carlos Ward and a third unidentified alto saxophonist and on another piece by an unidentified thumb pianist. Much of the session was issued in 1971 by Impulse! Records as Live in Seattle; other portions including Coltrane's last performance Billy Strayhorn's Lush Life appeared later on the album The Unissued Seattle Broadcast (RLR Records, 2011). See the Jim Wilke page for information on more recent releases from the 1960s material.

The Penthouse closed in 1968; the building was demolished shortly thereafter, replaced by a multi-story parking lot.

Seattle music historian Paul de Barros described The Penthouse, along with Pete's Poop Deck and Dave's Fifth Avenue as one of Seattle's "first true modern jazz clubs".

== Broadcast recordings ==
From 1962 to 1968, Jim Wilke hosted live Thursday-night broadcasts from the Penthouse on KING-FM. The station recorded the audio feed on reel-to-reel tape at its studios, initially so Wilke could review his work mixing the performances. The broadcasts lasted 30 minutes, but the recorder often kept running after the program went off the air. Wilke later acquired the tapes, more than 200 of which survived.

An early commercial release from the tapes appeared in the mid-1980s on Joe Williams's Then and Now. A series of archival releases began in 2014, many produced by Zev Feldman. They include Wes Montgomery and the Wynton Kelly Trio's Smokin' in Seattle (2017), Ahmad Jamal's three-volume Emerald City Nights: Live at the Penthouse (2022–2023), and Bill Evans's Portraits at the Penthouse (2025). In July 2026, Stereophile reported that about 10 percent of the archive had been released and that Feldman was working on further releases.
