= Sinfonie Orchester Schöneberg =

Amateur symphony orchestra in Berlin, Germany

- Orchestra
- Short name: SOS
- Founded: 1993
- Location: Berlin, Germany
- Concert hall: Berlin Philharmonie
- Principal conductor: Raphael Haeger
- Website: www.sos-ev.de

The Sinfonie Orchester Schöneberg (SOS) is an amateur symphony orchestra based in the Tempelhof-Schöneberg borough of Berlin, Germany. Founded in 1993 by former members of student orchestras, it performs regularly in the Great Hall of the Berlin Philharmonie.

The orchestra is registered as an eingetragener Verein and finances itself through membership dues, concert revenue, and donations.

== History ==
The ensemble was established in 1993 for amateur musicians who had outgrown student orchestras. It has become one of Berlin's established amateur orchestras and gives several concerts per year, frequently in the Philharmonie and at Rathaus Schöneberg.

== Repertoire and performances ==
The orchestra's repertoire includes symphonic works, concertos, and choral-symphonic music from various periods. Programs typically combine standard classical repertoire with lesser-known compositions.

It performs regularly at venues including the Berlin Philharmonie, Rathaus Schöneberg, and Berlin churches. Recent programs have featured works by Ethel Smyth, Bedřich Smetana, Leonard Bernstein, Jean Sibelius, Josef Suk, Louise Farrenc, and others.

The orchestra has collaborated with conductors including Gabriel Feltz, Hermann Bäumer, Henrik Schaefer, Carlos Spierer, Gerhardt Müller-Goldboom, Michael Sanderling, Stefan Rauh, Christoph Breidler, Mihhail Gerts, and Simon Rattle. Soloists have included musicians from the Berlin Philharmonic and other noted artists.

== Principal conductors ==
- Hermann Bäumer (1996–2000)
- Henrik Schaefer (2001–2002)
- Stanley Dodds (2003–2014)
- Raphael Haeger (2015–present)

== Concert tours ==
- 2000 – Mexico
- 2001 – Magdeburg, Dresden
- 2002 – Oranienbaum
- 2003 – Italy
- 2008 – Greece
- 2014 – Belgium
- 2017 – Görlitz
- 2019 – Wales (joint performance of Mendelssohn's Elijah with Cardiff Philharmonic)
