= Mover of the Earth, Stopper of the Sun =

- by Svitlana Azarova
- Composed: 2011
- Dedication: Nicolaus Copernicus
- Published: Donemus 12782

Premiere
- Date: 23 January 2013
- Location: Salle Pleyel, Paris
- Conductor: Enrique Mazzola

Mover of the Earth, Stopper of the Sun is a concert overture for large orchestra that was commissioned by Orchestre national d'Île-de-France (ONDIF) from composer Svitlana Azarova.

The composition is dedicated to Renaissance astronomer Nicolaus Copernicus.

== Performances ==
- World premiere on January 23, 2013, by ONDIF at Salle Pleyel, Paris.
- Dutch premiere on March 1, 2014, by NedPho conducted by Marc Albrecht at the Concertgebouw, Amsterdam.
- Ukrainian premiere on September 17, 2015, at the S. Lyudkevych Concert Hall, Lviv, by the INSO-Lviv Youth Academic Symphony Orchestra, conducted by Anna Skryleva.
- A planned performance by the Residentie Orkest in April 2020, conducted by Andrea Battistoni, was cancelled due to the COVID-19_pandemic.
- Swedish premiere on March 6–10, 2023, as part of Orchestra Project 4, performed by the symphony orchestra of the Academy of Music and Drama at the University of Gothenburg, conducted by Henrik Schaefer.
- German premiere on October 24, 2023, at the Sauerland Herbst Brass Festival at the Hagen Theatre, performed by The Hagen Philharmonic Orchestra, conducted by Rodrigo Tomillo.
- Swedish performance on October 23, 2025, as part of HSO – Storslagen romantik, performed by the Helsingborg Symphony Orchester, conducted by Joana Carneiro at the Helsingborg Concert Hall.

== Background ==
The name of this composition was taken from the Nicolaus Copernicus Monument, Toruń which bears a Latin inscription drawn up by Alexander von Humboldt: Nicolaus Copernicus Thorunensis, terrae motor, solis caelique stator - Nicolaus Copernicus of Thorun, mover of the earth, stopper of the sun and heavens

In the score Azarova graphically and musically shows Copernicus’s heliocentric cosmology which displaced the Earth from the center of the universe.

Bar	Instruments	Object
3	Cl.	Sun
19-20	Cl., Bsn	Earth
37	Ob., Cl	Jupiter which is Copernicus' planet
55	Fl., Ob.	Mars (Conductor Enrique Mazzola's planet)
56	Horns	Saturn which is Azarova's planet,
57-59	Ob., Cl.	Jupiter

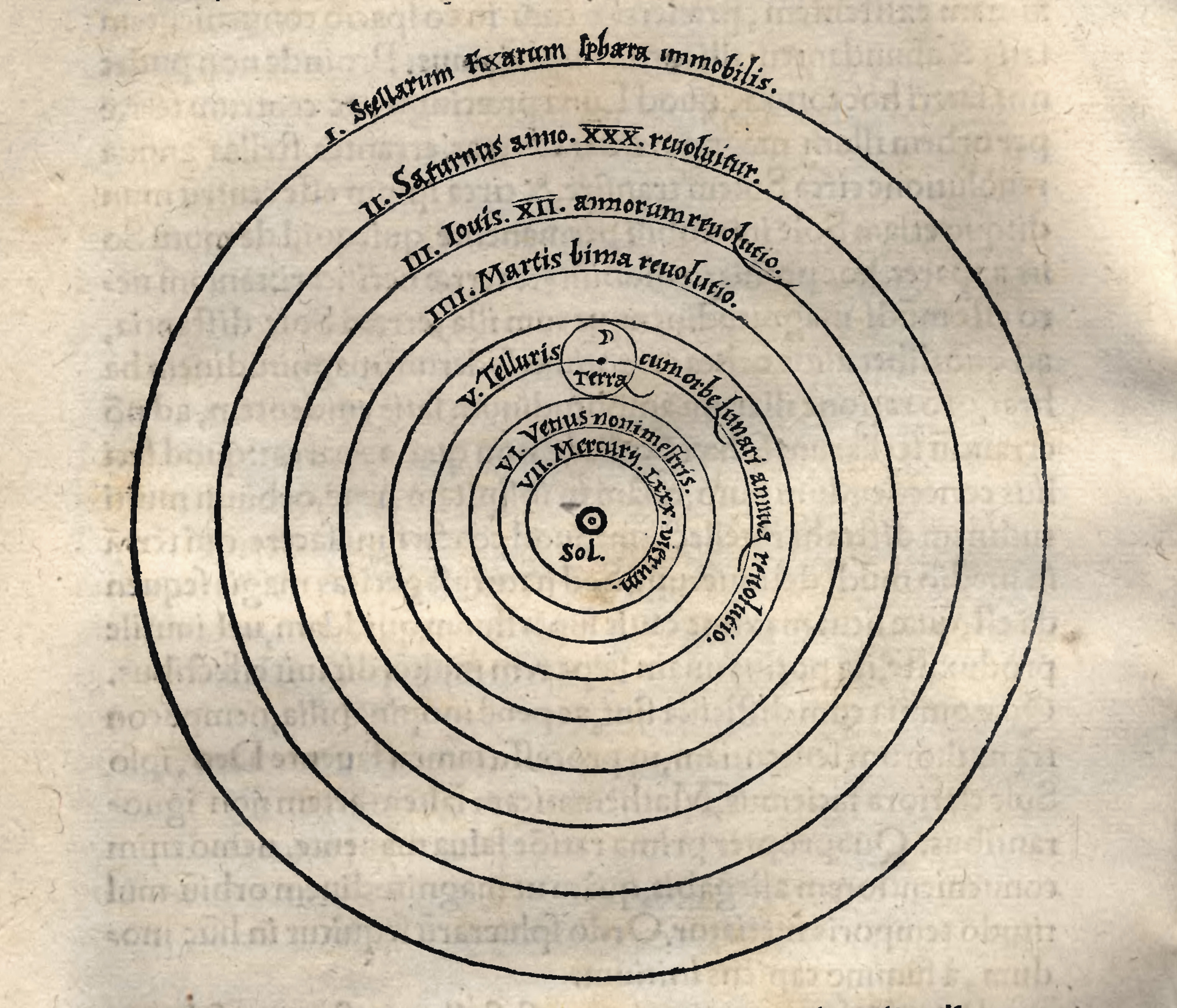
Copernican heliocentrism

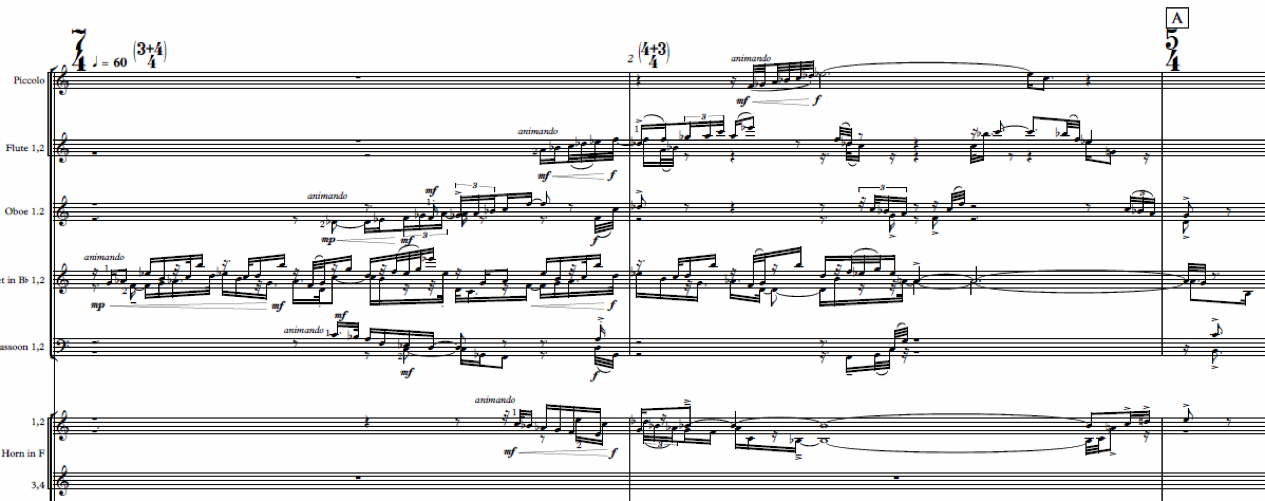
Heliocentrism in score

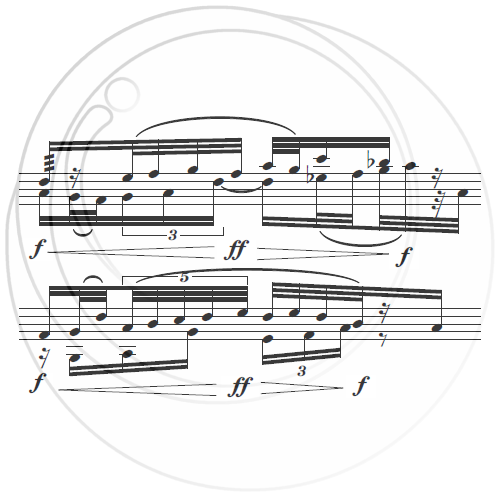
Excerpt from score depicting the Sun

== Instrumentation ==
Piccolo, 2 Flutes, 2 Oboes, 2 Clarinets in B♭, 2 Bassoons, 4 Horns in F, 2 Trumpets in B♭, 2 Trombones, Bass Trombone. Tuba, Timpani, Strings

Duration: ca. 5'
