= Svitlana Azarova =

Ukrainian-Dutch composer (born 1976)

- Світлана Азарова
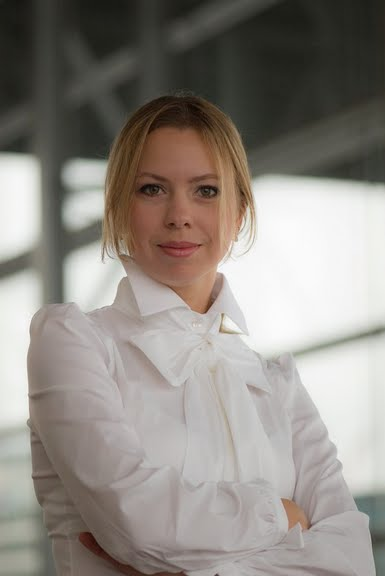
- Svitlana Azarova
- Born: January 9, 1976 (age 50); Izmail, Ukrainian SSR, Soviet Union (now Ukraine)
- Education: Odesa Conservatory, Amsterdam Conservatoire
- Occupation: Composer

Svitlana Azarova (Ukrainian: Світлана Азарова; born 9 January 1976) is a Ukrainian-Dutch composer of contemporary classical music, originally from the Ukrainian SSR.

== Early years ==
Svitlana Azarova was born on 9 January 1976, in Izmail, then in the Ukrainian SSR, now in Ukraine.

After having graduated in music from Odesa Pedagogical Institute as in 1996, Azarova entered Odesa Conservatory, where she studied musical composition, first under the Ukrainian composer Oleksandr Krasotov, and later (until 2000) under the Ukrainian author and composer Karmella Tsepkolenko.

In 2003 Azarova participated for six months in the Gaude Polonia scholarship program, at the Frédéric Chopin Academy of Music in Warsaw, under Marcin Blazewicz. Later that year, the Dresden Centre of Music (DZzM) invited Azarova to participate in the Scholarship project pass_ПОРТ within the Dresdner Tage der zeitgenössischen Musik. This project met again at the 8th musica viva in Munich in 2007.

In 2005 With a grant of the society KulturKontakt Austria she elected to participate in the 9th International Academy for New Composition and Audio-Art, Avantgarde Tirol with Professor Boguslaw Schaeffer and Dr. Richard Boulanger (Seefeld, Tirol, Austria). After this academy, she took up permanent residency of The Hague and in 2006 began post-graduate studies at conservatoire in Amsterdam under Theo Loevendie where she graduated Master of Music in December 2007

Composer Residencies:

- 2007, 2015, 2016, 2023 - Visby International Centre for Composers (VICC) (Gotland, Sweden)
- 2008 - Czech Music Information Centre (Prague, Czech Republic)

== Career ==
The music of Svitlana Azarova is performed by ensembles and orchestras internationally. This includes

- Petra Stump, clarinet (Austria)
- Mariko Nishioka percussion (Japan) and Yuka Sugimoto percussion (Japan)
- Nieuw Ensemble (The Netherlands)
- Stephan Vermeersch (Belgium)
- Marcel Worms (The Netherlands)
- Ensemble pass_ПОРТ (Ukraine - Germany - Brazil - France), Conductor: Kevin John Edusei
- Sinfonia Iuventus, conductor: Roman Rewakowicz (Poland)
- Eastern Connecticut Symphony Orchestra conducted by Toshiyuki Shimada
- Orchestre national d'Île-de-France (ONDIF) conductor Enrique Mazzola
- Netherlands Philharmonic Orchestra (NedPho) conductor Marc Albrecht
- Royal Danish Opera conductor Anna-Maria Helsing

== Compositions ==
- 2025
  - Hyperion for ensemble
- 2024
  - Trojaborg 2 (Ukrainian) for clarinet
- 2023
  - Awesome Stories for 6 guitars
- 2019
  - Hoc Vinces! for large orchestra
- 2015-2016
  - Momo and the time thieves; the story of the child, who brought the stolen time back to the people full size opera in two acts for large orchestra, choir and soloists. Based on the novel Momo (novel) by Michael Ende; commissioned by the Royal Danish Opera, world premiere 15 October 2017 on the big stage of Copenhagen Opera House (Holmen).
- 2014
  - Hundred thirty one Angstrom symphony for large orchestra
- 2013
  - Concerto Grosso for violin, viola solo and string orchestra
- 2011
  - Mover of the Earth, Stopper of the Sun for symphony orchestra (overture), commissioned by ONDIF
  - I fell into the sky... for viola solo World premièred by Emlyn Stam of New European Ensemble
- 2010
  - Pure thoughts transfixed symphony for large orchestra
- 2008
  - Beyond Context for chamber orchestra, commissioned by the Polish Institute in Kyiv
  - From this kind... for choir, brass and percussion on words by Oksana Zabuzhko
- 2007
  - 300 steps above for carillon
  - Trojaborg for solo clarinet
  - Epices for soprano, bass clarinet, trompet, perc., piano, violin
  - Un cortado para Michel for baroque flute (traverso) and soundtrack
  - Onderdrukte Haast (Suppressed Haste) for Brass Quintet
  - On Tuesdays for ensemble with words by Daniil Harms. World premièred by Nieuw Ensemble
- 2006
  - Sounds from the Yellow Planet for ensemble and recordings of throat singing by Khoomei virtuoso Nikolay Oorzhak
  - Model Citizens for violoncello and piano, commissioned by Doris Hochscheid and Frans van Ruth
  - Valentina's Blues for piano, commissioned by Marcel Worms and published on his CD Red, White and Blues, 32 New Dutch Blues (Attacca Records #27103)
- 2005
  - Hotel Charlotte for string quartet
  - Dive for violin and piano
  - The Violinist's morning espresso for violin
- 2004
  - Outvoice, outstep and outwalk for bass clarinet
  - Asiope for ensemble
- 2003
  - Go-as-you-please for ensemble
  - Symphonic Lana Sweet for large symphony orchestra
  - Slavic Gods for flute, clarinet, accordion and cello
  - West - East for ensemble
  - Don't go: not now for flute, oboe and bassoon
  - Feet on Fire for 2 percussion
  - Funk Island for corno bassetto and piano
- 2002
  - In the Icy Loneliness for 2 cellos
  - Axis of Every Karuss... for clarinet, piano and cello
- 2001
  - As for the Clot it is Slowly... for solo tuba
- 2000
  - The Dance of Birds for string orchestra
  - Chronometer for piano
- 1999
  - Symphonic Poem for large symphony orchestra
  - Diagram for 5 cellos
  - Punished by Love vocal cycle on verses by Ludmyla Olijnyk (in Russian) for soprano and piano
  - Sonata-Diptych for clarinet and piano

== Bibliography ==
- Paolo Tortiglione TortiglioneSvitlana Azarova in Semiography and Semiology of Contemporary Music, Edizioni Rugginenti, 2013
- Slaby, Z. + Slaby, P. Svitlana Azarova in The Encyclopedia of the World of Another Music (Svìt jiné hudby), vol. 2. Prague: Volvox Globator Publishing House, p. 73 - 74
- Kötter, D. Svitlana Azarova, Asiope, WestEast 8. Musica Viva Veranstaltung 2006 | 2007 [Sonderveranstaltung] p. 7, 10
- Von Adelbert and Reif, R. R. pass_PORT and Svitlana Azarova in Applaus #6/2007 p. 32
- Schwarz, S. Svitlana Azarova in Offende Grenzen in Süddeutschen Zeitung Wochenendeausgabe 30. Juni/1 Juli 2007
- Vojzizka, E. review of Chronometer in Kievskij Telegraf #40 13 October 2005, p. 7
- Desiateryk, D. Svitlana Azarova and pass_PORT in Kyiv The Day #28, Tuesday, 26 October 2004
- Perepelytsya, O. Svitlana Azarova in Contemporary composers of Ukraine reference guide-book, Issue 1. Odesa 2002 Association New Music, p. 100-101
- Bukkvoll, Tor & Thuesen, Nils Petter. (2014, 8. juni). Svitlana Azarova in Contemporary composers of Ukraine Store norske leksikon. Retrieved 14. Dec. 2014.
