= Momo (novel) =

1973 fantasy novel by Michael Ende

- First edition (German)
- Author: Michael Ende
- Language: German
- Genre: Fantasy novel
- Publisher: Thienemann Verlag (German), Puffin Books (English)
- Publication date: January 1973
- Publication place: West Germany
- English publication date: 1974 / 1984
- Media type: Print (Hardback & Paperback)
- ISBN: 0-14-031753-8
- OCLC: 12805336

Momo, also known as The Grey Gentlemen or The Men in Grey, is a fantasy novel by Michael Ende, published in 1973. The book won the German Youth Literature Award in 1974. The full title in German (Momo oder Die seltsame Geschichte von den Zeit-Dieben und von dem Kind, das den Menschen die gestohlene Zeit zurückbrachte) translates to Momo, or the strange story of the time-thieves and the child who brought the stolen time back to the people.

The book is about a mysterious little girl named Momo — who helps people by listening to them — and her encounter with the elusive time-stealing Men in Grey.

== Plot ==
In the ruins of an amphitheatre just outside an unnamed city lives Momo, a little girl of mysterious origin. When asked, she replies, "As far as I remember, I've always been around." She is well-known in the neighbourhood due to her extraordinary ability to listen. By simply being with people and listening to them, she can help them find answers to their problems, make up with each other, and think of fun games. Momo makes many friends, especially an honest and silent street-cleaner, Beppo, and a poetic, extroverted tour guide, Gigi (Guido in some translations).

This pleasant atmosphere is spoiled by the arrival of the Men in Grey, eventually revealed as a species of paranormal parasites stealing the time of humans. These grey-clad, grey-skinned bald men present themselves as representatives of the Timesavings Bank and promote the idea of "timesaving" among the population: supposedly, time can be deposited in the Bank and returned to the client later with interest. After encountering the Men in Grey, people are made to forget all about them, but not about the resolution to save as much time as possible for later use.

Gradually, the sinister influence of the Men in Grey affects the whole city: life becomes sterile, devoid of all things considered time-wasting, like social activities, recreation, art, imagination, or sleeping. Buildings and clothing are made exactly the same for everyone, and the rhythms of life become hectic. In reality, the more time people save, the less they have; the time they save is actually lost to them, consumed by the Men in Grey in the form of cigars made from the dried petals of the hour-lilies that represent time. Without these cigars, the Men in Grey cannot exist.

Momo, however, is a wrench in the plans of the Men in Grey, thanks to her special personality. Various plans to deal with her directly fail, so the Men in Grey start targeting her friends instead. When everyone else has fallen under the influence of the Men in Grey in one way or another, Momo meets Cassiopeia, a tortoise who can communicate through writing on her shell and can see thirty minutes into the future. Cassiopeia leads Momo to the administrator of Time, Master Secundus Minutius Hora, where they form a plan to defeat the Men in Grey.

Hora stops time, freezing everyone except the Men in Grey, Cassiopeia and Momo, thanks to one last hour-lily he has given her. With their supply flow cut off, all the Men in Grey rush to their underground lair, where Momo follows. She observes as they decimate their own number in order to stretch their stockpile of time as far as possible. With the advice of Cassiopeia and by using the hour-lily, Momo is able to shut the door to the vault where the stolen lilies are kept. Now facing extinction as soon as their cigars are consumed, the few remaining Men in Grey pursue Momo, perishing one by one. The last Man in Grey finally begs her to give him the hour-lily so that he can open the vault. When she refuses, he too vanishes, remarking that "it is good it is over".

Using the last minute she has before her hour-lily crumbles, Momo opens the vault again, releasing the millions of hour-lilies stored within. The stolen time returns to its proper owners, causing time to start again (without people knowing it had ever halted). Momo is reunited with her friends, while Master Hora rejoices together with Cassiopeia.

== Major themes ==
The main theme of Momo can be seen as a criticism of consumerism and stress. It describes the personal and social losses produced by unnecessary consumption, and the danger to be driven by a hidden interest group with enough power to induce people into this lifestyle. Michael Ende has also stated to have had the concept of demurrage currency in mind when writing Momo.

Childhood is also an important subject in many of Ende's books. In Momo it is used to offer contrast with the adult society. As children have "all the time in the world", they are a difficult target for the Men in Grey: children cannot be convinced that their games are time-wasting. The author uses a mockery of Barbie dolls and other expensive toys as symbols to show how anyone can be persuaded, even indirectly, into consumerism.

Robert N. Peck described that Momo has five principal elements: taking time, listening, imagining, persons and music.

== Literary significance ==
An article by philosopher David Loy and literature professor Linda Goodhew called Momo "one of the most remarkable novels of the late twentieth century". They further state that: "One of the most amazing things about Momo is that it was published in 1973. Since then, the temporal nightmare it depicts has become our reality."

Ende himself has said that "Momo is a tribute of gratitude to Italy and also a declaration of love," indicating that the author idealized the Italian way of life. Loy and Goodhew suggested that Ende's perspective on time coincided with his interest in Buddhism and that for example the deliberately slow character of Beppo might be regarded as a Zen master, even though Ende wrote the book long before his visits to Japan.

When the book was published in the U.S. in 1985, Natalie Babbit from The Washington Post commented: "Is it a children's book? Not here in America." Momo was republished by Puffin Press on January 19, 2009.

Then Norwegian Prime Minister Thorbjørn Jagland, in his New Year Address to the nation on January 1, 1997, referenced Ende's book and its plot: "People are persuaded to save time by eliminating everything not useful. One of the people so influenced cuts out his girlfriend, sells his pet, stops singing, reading and visiting friends. In this way he will supposedly become an efficient man getting something out of life. What is strange is that he is in a greater hurry than ever. The saved-up time disappears—and he never sees it again." Prime Minister Jagland went on to say that to many people, time has become the scarcest resource of all, contrary to their attempt at saving as much of it as possible.

== Adaptations ==
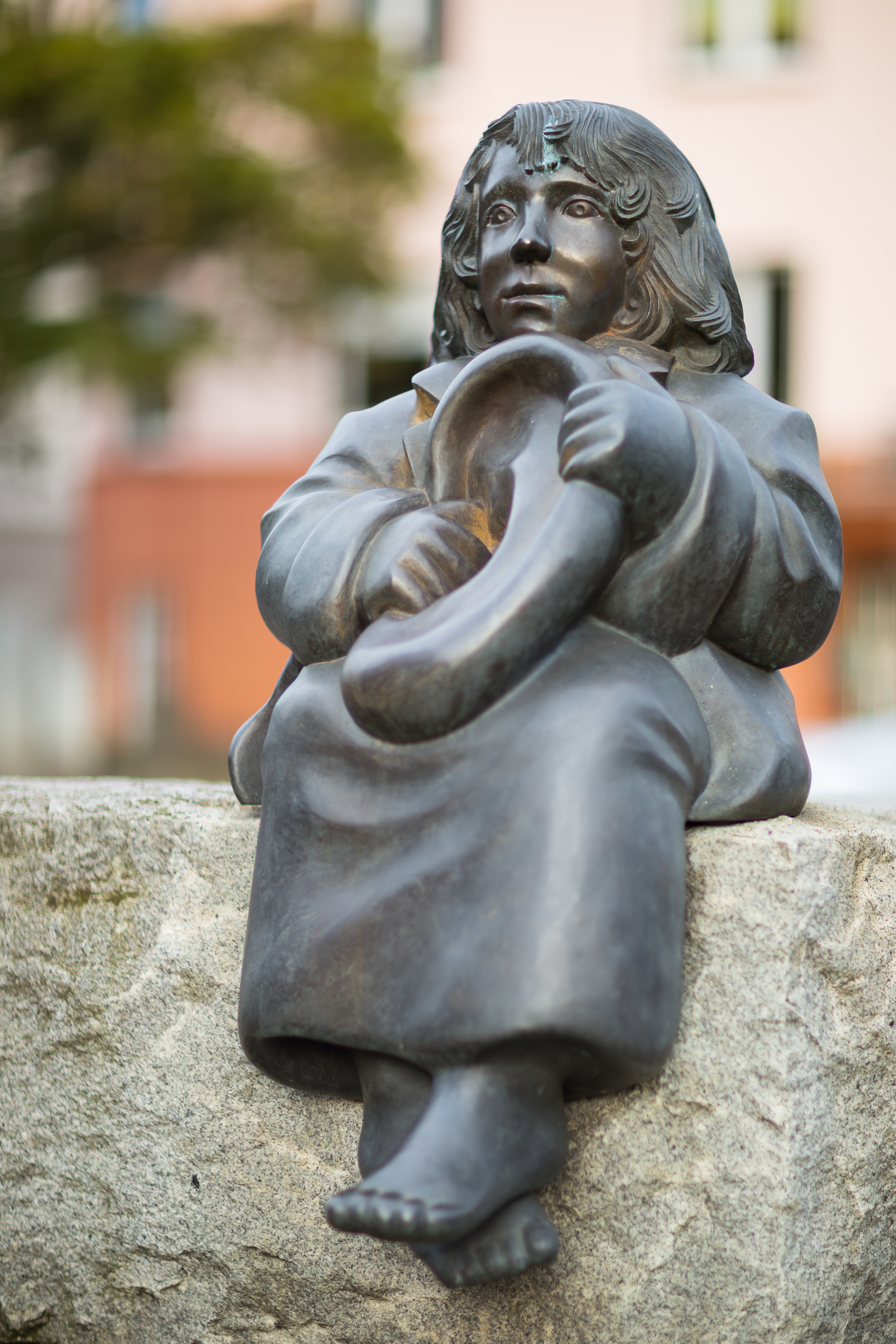
Momo sculpture by Ulrike Enders located at Michael-Ende-Platz square in Hanover, Germany

- Momo was made into a film of Italian/German production in 1986, in which Michael Ende himself played a small role as the narrator who encounters Professor Hora (performed by John Huston) at the beginning of the film (and at the end of the book). The role of Momo was performed by German actress and model Radost Bokel.
  - Momo (trailer) on YouTube
- Momo (2001) is an Italian animated film based on the novel. It is directed by Enzo D'Alò and features a soundtrack by Gianna Nannini, an Italian popular singer. In 2003, a 26-episode animated television series based directly on this adaptation was released, serving as an extended re-telling of the film.
- The book has also been acted in radio programmes.
- A German dramatized audiobook under the title Momo (Karussell/Universal Music Group 1984, directed by Anke Beckert, narrated by Harald Leipnitz, music by Frank Duval, 3 parts on LP and MC, 2 parts on CD)
- There have been a number of stage adaptations, including an opera written by Ende himself and an English-language version by Andy Thackeray.
- Legend of Raana (2014), animated miniseries directed by Majid Ahmady
- In 2015, the Royal Danish Opera commissioned composer Svitlana Azarova to write Momo and the Time Thieves. Its world premiere occurred at the Copenhagen Opera House in October, 2017.
- In January 2023, it was announced that Christian Ditter would direct an English-language film adaptation of the novel with Christian Becker producing.
  - Momo (2025 film) was announced as being scheduled for a 2025 release on 12 June 2025 when the Youtube Trailer dropped

== Translations ==
Momo has been translated into various languages including Arabic, Asturian, Bulgarian, Croatian, Catalan, Chinese (Simplified), Chinese (Traditional), Czech, Danish, Dutch, English, Estonian, Finnish, French, Galician, Greek, Hebrew, Hungarian, Icelandic, Indonesian, Italian, Japanese, Korean, Latvian, Lithuanian, Mongolian, Norwegian, Persian, Polish, Portuguese, Romanian, Russian, Serbian, Slovenian, Spanish, Swedish, Turkish, Thai, Ukrainian, Vietnamese and Sinhalese.

The original English translation The Grey Gentlemen by Frances Lobb was published in 1974. A second English translation, Momo, was published in 1984. A newly translated edition, translated by Lucas Zwirner and illustrated by Marcel Dzama, was released in the US by McSweeney's in August 2013, in celebration of the book's fortieth anniversary. The McSweeney edition was scheduled for a new release in January 2017.

The Spanish translation Momo, o la extraña historia de los ladrones del tiempo y la niña que devolvió el tiempo a los hombres was made by Susana Constante in 1978 for Ediciones Alfaguara: it was a great success in Spain and Latin America, having dozens of reprints since.

The Persian translation was published several times, initially in 1980, by Zarrin Publishers in Tehran. At the time of publication, it enjoyed great popularity in Iran, but lapsed out of print in 1992. This, along with a stop in publishing other children's books by German and other European writers, is part of an ongoing trend in publishing American and English children's fiction in that country.

== In popular culture ==
- An episode of the anime adaptation of Sailor Moon features a plot similar to the plot of the Men in Grey where the villain Jadeite steals the time of the people of Tokyo.
- The story of Momo plays a role in the Korean TV series My Lovely Sam Soon, where the main character's niece chooses to not speak due to post-traumatic stress of having both her parents killed in a car accident. The lead character buys the book and reads it (by himself and also to his niece) to try to understand his love interest more.
- The novel is referred to in each episode of the Japanese TV series A Girl of 35, starring Ko Shibasaki and Kentaro Sakaguchi (2020). The lead character wakes up after 25 years in a coma and feels her time has been stolen. She uses the Momo characters to learn how to grow up and come to terms with the tragic consequences her accident had for her whole family.
- The Korean girl group Momoland was named after this novel.
- One of the short stories within the Monogatari Series (Yotsugi Future) focuses on one of the characters' perception of the novel, which she compares the concept of time to herself, and adults who waste valuable time.
- K-pop singer and leader of the group Exo, Suho, was inspired by the novel in creating the concept and title for his sophomore album Grey Suit, as well as the title-track.
- The characters of Momo Ayase and Jin "Jiji" Enjoji from the anime Dandadan by Yukinobu Tatsu were partly named after both Momo and Guido/Gigi.
- In 2025, Sevan Kirder's Thalassor released a concept album based on Momo, named Eternal Now.
