= Momo and the Time Thieves =

2017 Danish opera by Svitlana Azarova

- Opera by Svitlana Azarova
- Description: Opera
- Native title: Danish: Momo og tidstyvene
- Librettist: Anna Bro
- Based on: Momo by Michael Ende
- Premiere: 15 October 2017; Copenhagen Opera House

Momo and the Time Thieves (Danish: Momo og tidstyvene) is a Danish-language opera in two acts by Svitlana Azarova. The libretto, based on the 1973 children's book Momo by Michael Ende, was written by Anna Bro.

The opera was commissioned by the Royal Danish Opera, Copenhagen, and written in 2015 and 2016; It was published by Donemus and was world premiered on 15 October 2017. It was rewarded with 5 stars from Politiken and Berlingske among others.

- Conductor: Anna-Maria Helsing
- Stage director: Elisabeth Linton
- Scenography and costumes: Palle Steen Christensen
- Lighting: Ulrik Gad
- Choreographer: Sara Ekman
- Dramaturg: Louise Nabe
- Choir masters: Denis Segond and Ole Faurschou

== Roles ==
Roles, voice type, premiere cast
Role	Voice type	Premiere cast, 15 October 2017
Momo	soprano	Anke Briegel
Beppo	baritone	Sten Byriel
Gigi	countertenor	Morten Grove Frandsen
Master Ora	baritone	Palle Knudsen
Fusi	tenor	Jens Christian Tvilum
Nino	baritone	Morten Staugaard
Liliana	mezzo-soprano	Hanne Fisher
Nicola	bass	Simon Duus
Leader of the Grey Gentlemen	actor	Ole Lemmeke
Agent blw/553/c	tenor	Gert Henning-Jensen
Agent xyq/384/b	baritone	Andreas Landin
Bibi girl	coloratura soprano	Sofie Elkjær Jensen
Assistant 1	soprano	Karen Dinitzen
Assistant 2	mezzo-soprano	Helle Fabricius Grarup
Grey Gentleman 1	tenor	Lars Bo Ravnbak
Grey Gentleman 2	bass	Rasmus Ruge
Grey Gentleman 3	mezzo-soprano	Pia Rose Hansen
Grey Gentleman 4	mezzo-soprano	Henriette Elmar
Policeman	bass	Martin Christopher Briody
Cassiopeia (mechanical turtle)		operated by Anna Dyrby
Maria, Paolo, Dede, Claudio, Franco	Children soloists	Singers from Sankt Annæ Gymnasium
children's choir		Choir of Sankt Annæ Gymnasium
mixed choir		The Royal Opera Choir

== Instrumentation ==
- Woodwinds: piccolo, 2 flutes, 2 oboes, English horn, 2 clarinets in B-flat, bass clarinet in B-flat, 2 bassoons, contrabassoon
- Brass: 4 horns in F, 3 trumpets in B-flat, 3 trombones, tuba
- Percussion (3 players) 1: suspended crotales in F♯, wind chimes, timpani; 2: suspended cymbal (right), piccolo snare, snare drum, 4 rototoms, Taiko/Buk (medium), bass drum; 3: vibraphone, 4 tom-toms, taiko/buk (low), bass drum wind gong, big suspended thunder sheet
- Strings: violins I, violins II, violas, cellos, double basses

== Gallery ==
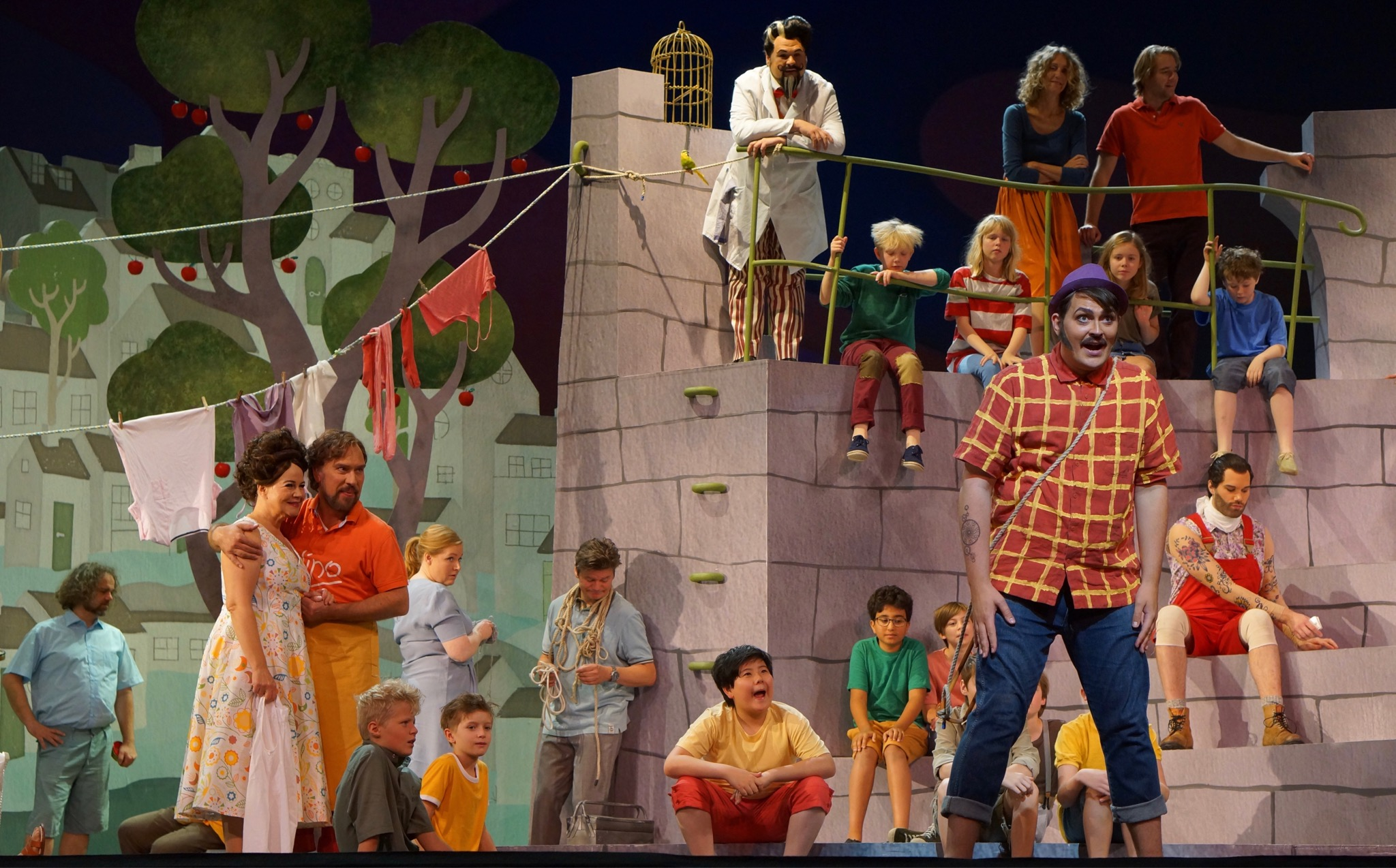
Gigi in the amphitheatre

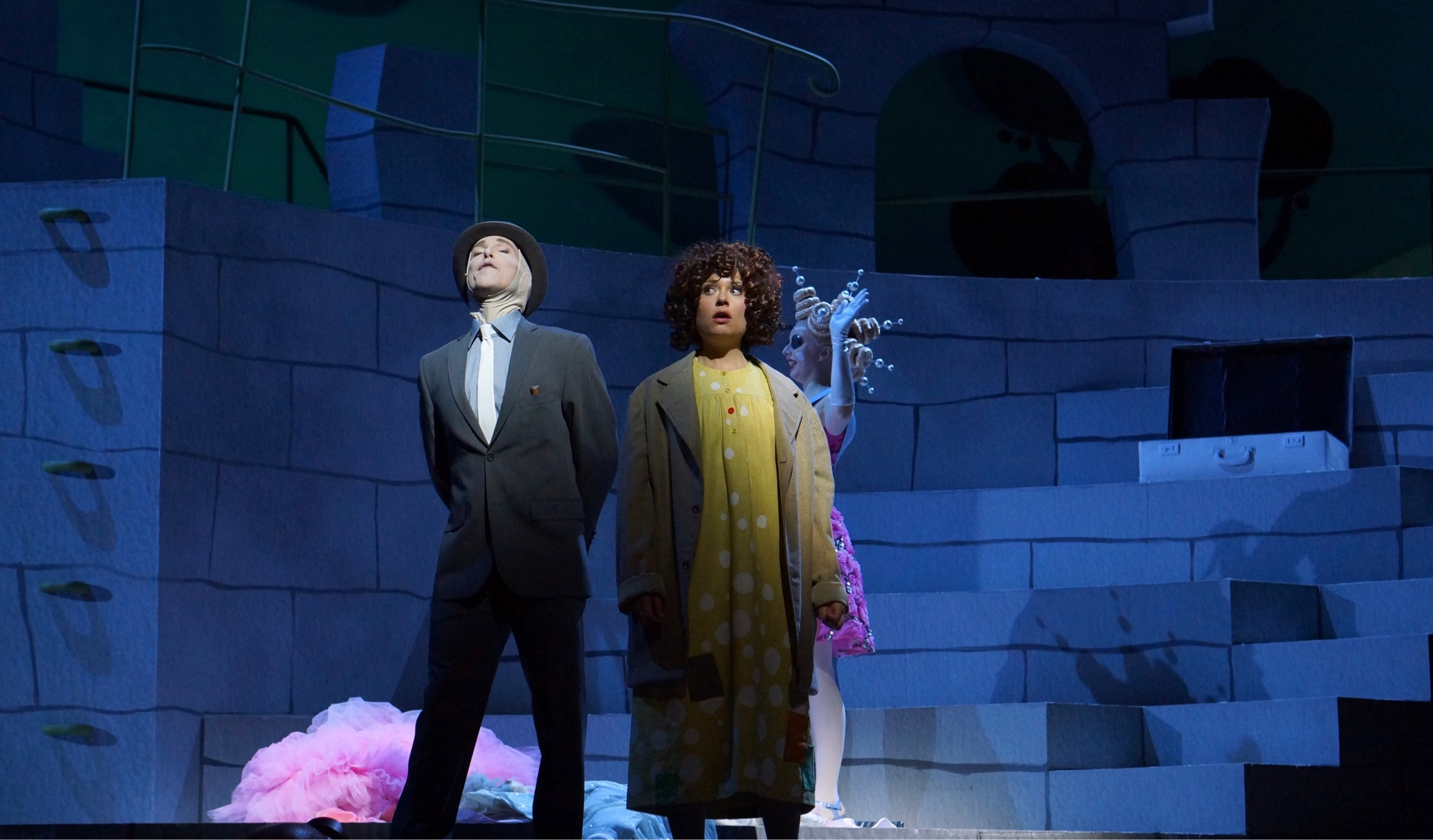
Agent blw/553/c, Momo and Bibi Girl.

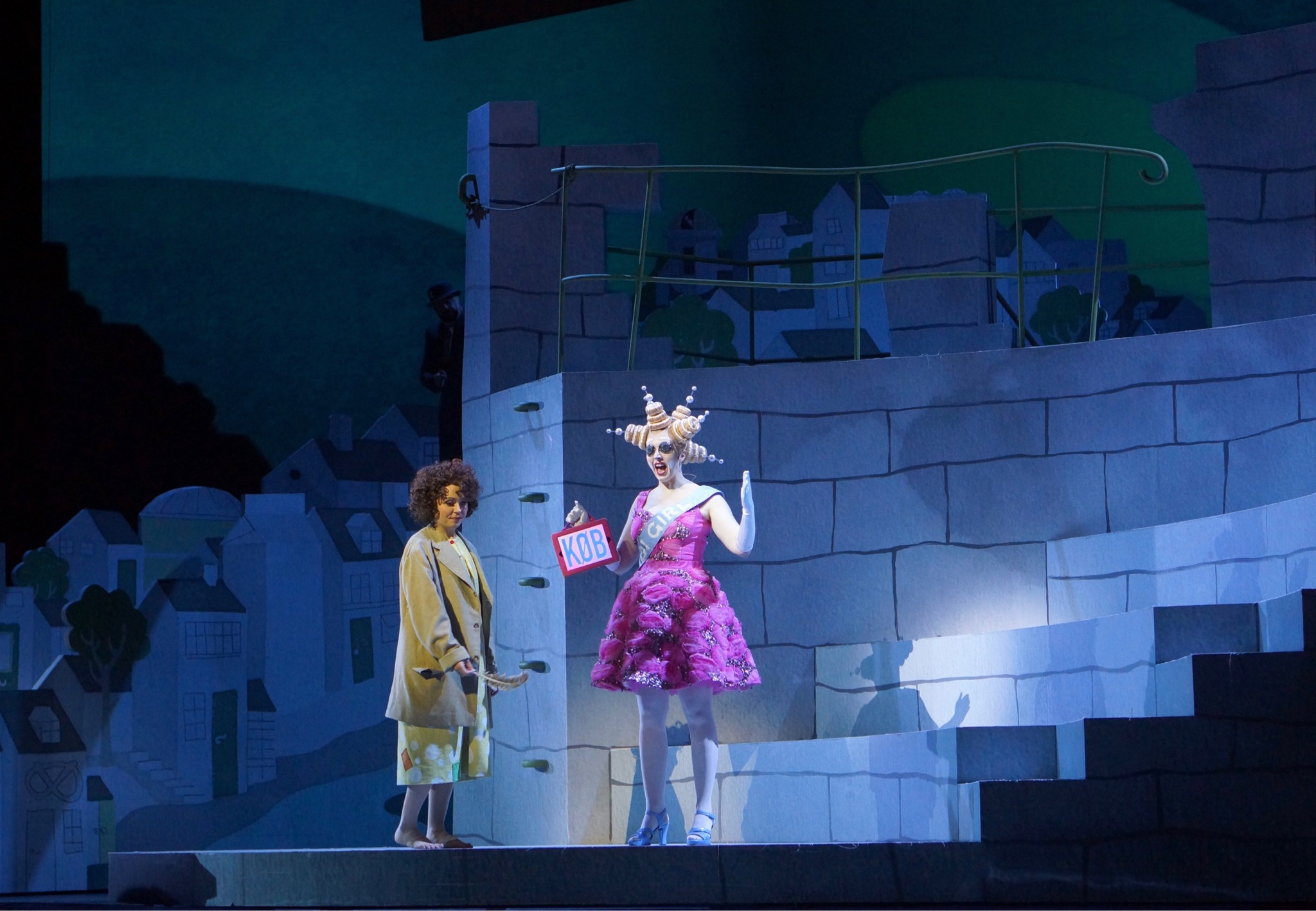
Bibi girl and Agent blw/553

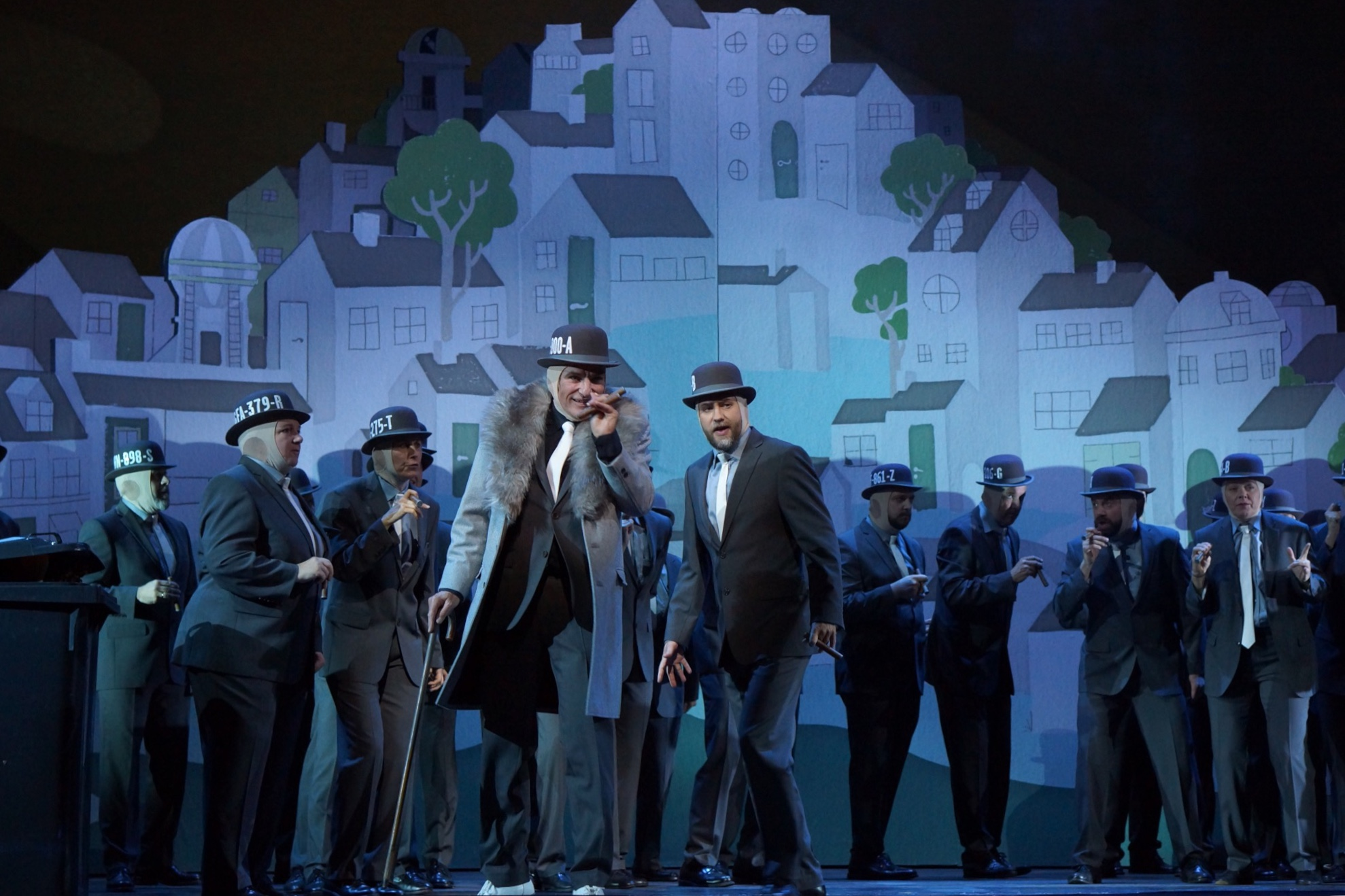
Grey Gentlemen

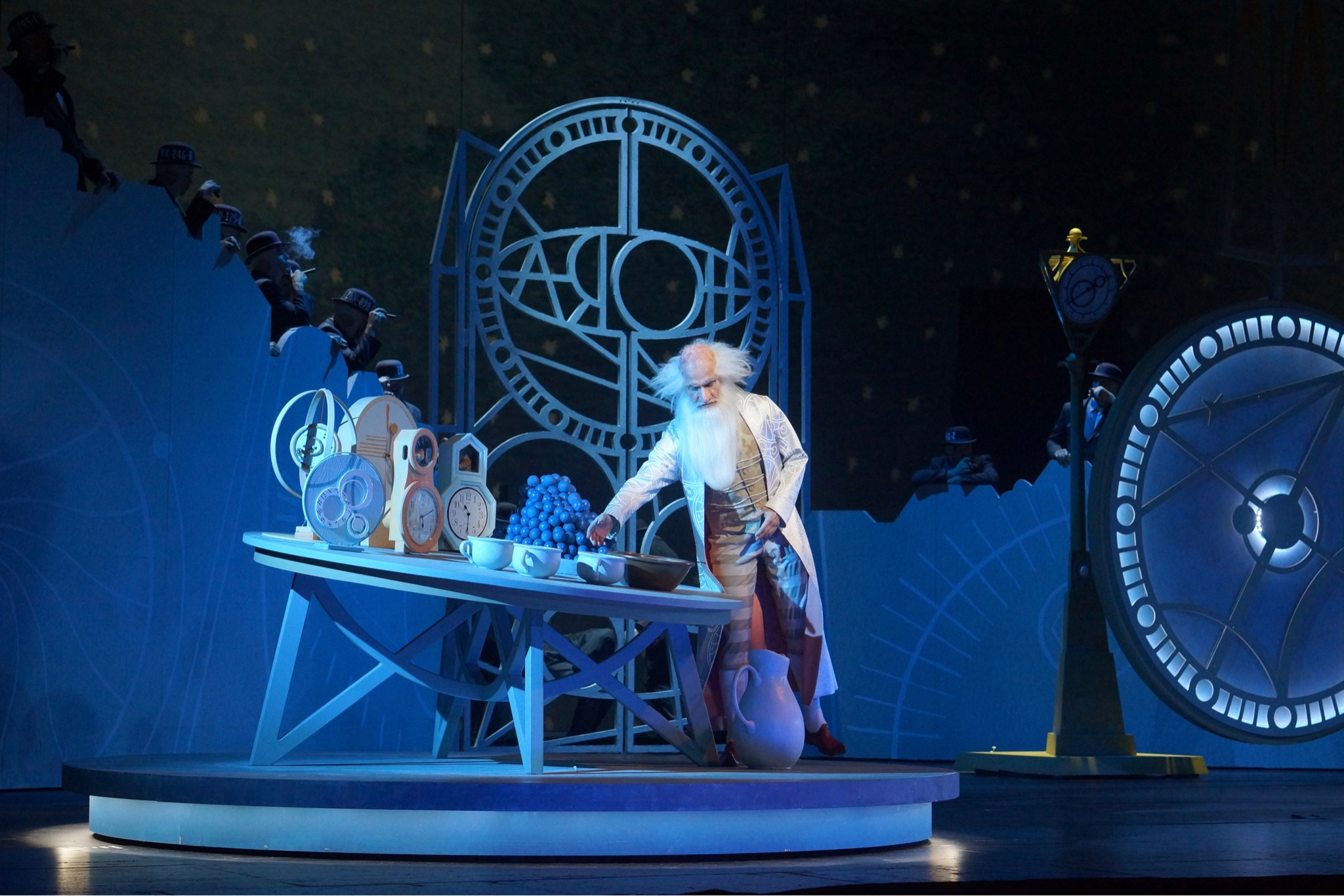
Master Hora

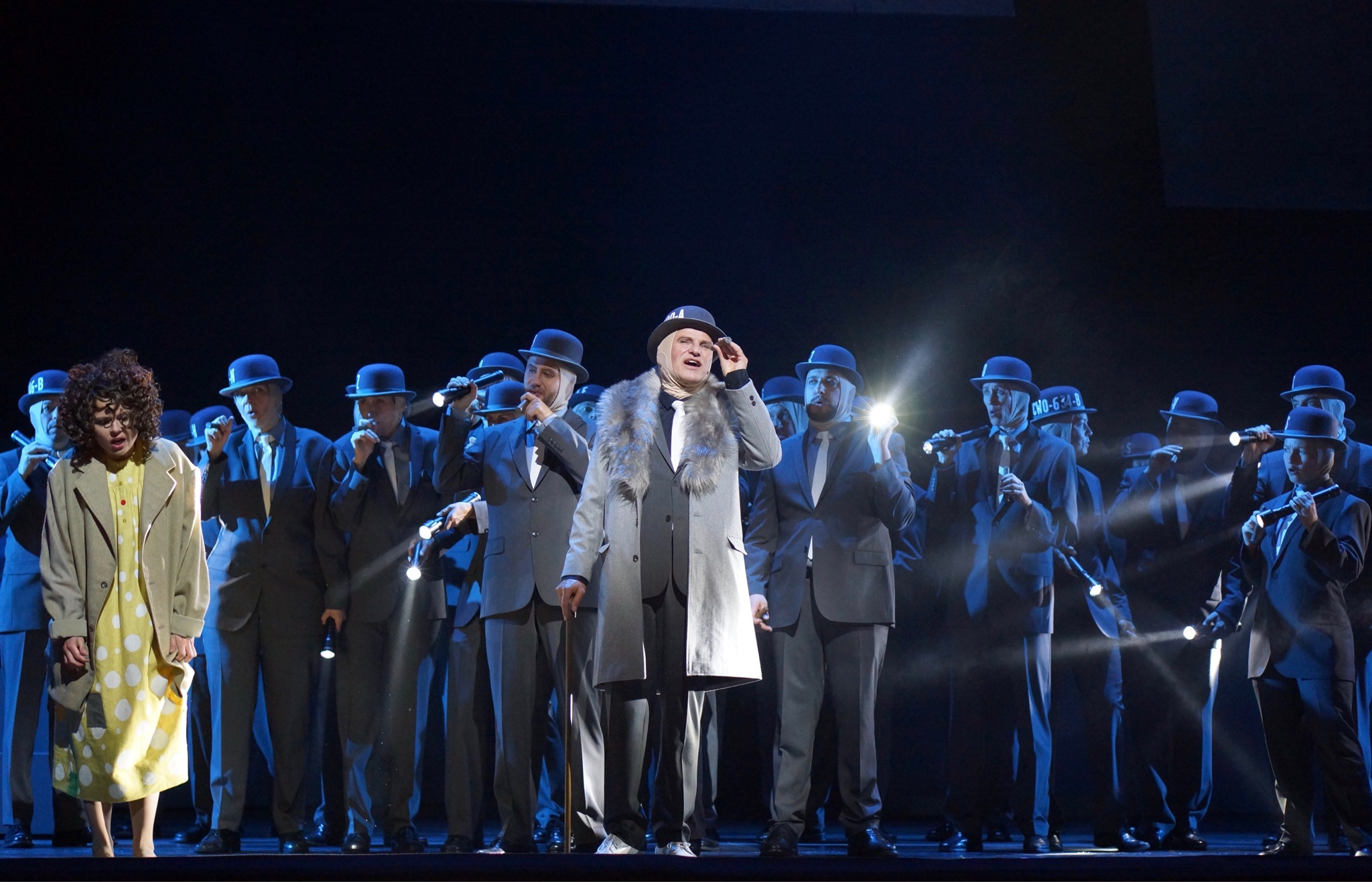
Momo and the Grey Gentlemen

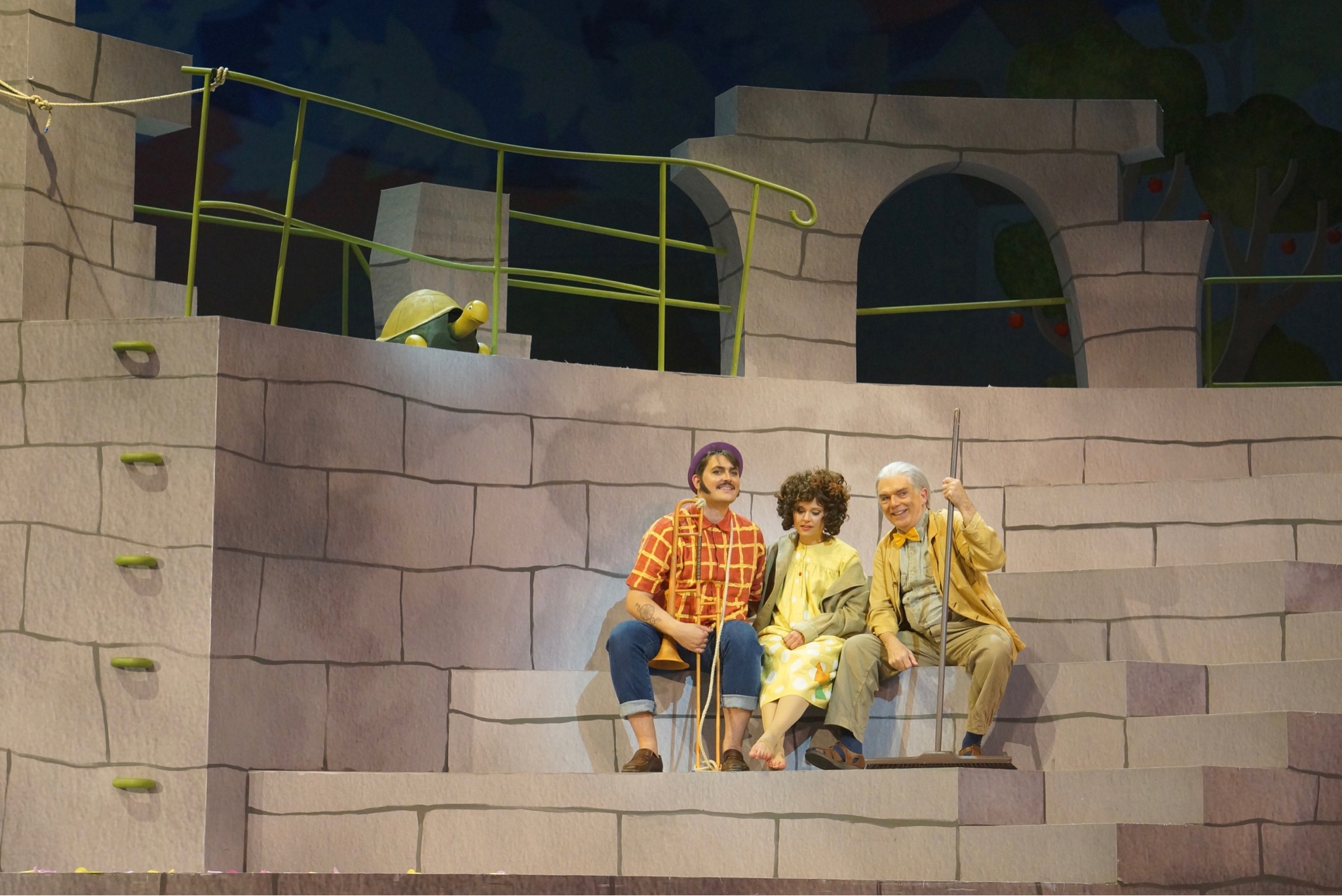
Cassiopeia, Gigi, Momo and Beppo
