= The Last Set at Newport =

Live album by Dave Brubeck
- Released: 1972
- Recorded: July 3, 1971
- Venue: Newport Jazz Festival, Newport, Rhode Island
- Genre: Jazz
- Length: 34:51
- Label: Atlantic
- Producer: George Wein, Nesuhi Ertegun

Dave Brubeck chronology
Live at the Berlin Philharmonie (1973)	The Last Set at Newport (1972)	Truth Is Fallen (1972)

The Last Set at Newport is a 1971 live album by Dave Brubeck and his quartet recorded at the 1971 Newport Jazz Festival, shortly before a riot ensued. The album peaked at 16 on the Billboard Top Jazz Charts.

== Reception ==
Professional ratings
Review scores
Source	Rating
Allmusic	4/5 stars
The Penguin Guide to Jazz Recordings	3/4 stars

The album was reviewed by Scott Yanow at Allmusic who wrote that "The Dave Brubeck-Gerry Mulligan quartet is heard in a very inspired performance at the Newport Jazz Festival, just a short time before a riot by the audience closed the festival. These versions of "Take Five" and "Open the Gates" are memorable, but it is the extended "Blues for Newport" that is truly classic." Yanow wrote that the musicians "...constantly challenge each other during this exciting performance, making this set well-worth searching for."

== Track listing ==
1. Introduction by Father Norman O'Connor - 0:39
2. "Blues for Newport" (Dave Brubeck) - 16:24
3. "Take Five" (Paul Desmond) - 9:49
4. "Open the Gates (Out of the Way of the People)" (Brubeck) - 8:12

== Personnel ==
- Dave Brubeck - piano, producer
- Gerry Mulligan - baritone saxophone
- Jack Six - double bass
- Alan Dawson - drums

Production

- Aaron Baron, Larry Dahlstrom, Tom Dowd - engineer
- George Wein - liner notes, producer
- David Gahr - photography
- Nesuhi Ertegun - producer
- Michael Cuscuna, Lewis Hahn - remixing
