= Live at the Berlin Philharmonie =

Live album by Dave Brubeck Trio and Gerry Mulligan
- Released: 1972
- Recorded: November 7, 1970
- Venue: Berlin Philharmonie, Berlin
- Genre: Jazz
- Length: 1:56:30 (reissue)
- Label: Columbia
- Producer: Dave Brubeck (original), Russell Gloyd (reissue)

Dave Brubeck chronology
Brubeck/Mulligan/Cincinnati (1970)	Live at the Berlin Philharmonie (1972)	The Last Set at Newport (1972)

Live at the Berlin Philharmonie is a 1970 live album by Dave Brubeck and his trio with Gerry Mulligan recorded at the Berlin Philharmonie. It was reissued in 1995 with several bonus tracks. The album peaked at 21 on the Billboard Top Jazz Charts.

== Reception ==
Professional ratings
Review scores
Source	Rating
Allmusic	4.5/5 stars
The Penguin Guide to Jazz Recordings	4/4 stars

The 1995 reissue of Live at the Berlin Philharmonie was reviewed by Scott Yanow at Allmusic who wrote that "Considering how inspired the Dave Brubeck Quartet sounds, it is surprising that the music has been so obscure for so long. Baritonist Gerry Mulligan is particularly heated on the opening two numbers (the unreleased tracks), pianist Dave Brubeck really stretches himself (check him out on "Things Ain't What They Used to Be" where he progresses from stride to free), and bassist Jack Six and drummer Alan Dawson, in addition to their solo space, are quite alert and constantly pushing the lead voices. Not only are the musicians in top form but the audience is very enthusiastic, demanding three encores. The extensive liner notes by Geoffrey Smith are also a major plus. Highly recommended."

== Track listing ==
- For the 1972 US LP issue:
1. "Things Ain't What They Used to Be" (Duke Ellington, Mercer Ellington, Ted Persons) - 14:55
2. "Blessed Are the Poor (The Sermon on the Mount)" (Dave Brubeck) - 9:04
3. "Indian Song" (Brubeck) - 10:58
4. "Limehouse Blues" (Philip Braham, Douglas Furber) - 9:52
5. "Lullaby de Mexico" (Mulligan) - 5:03
- For the 1995 CD reissue:

CD 1

1. "Out of Nowhere" (Johnny Green, Edward Heyman) - 10:59
2. "Mexican Jumping Bean" (Gerry Mulligan) - 9:24
3. "Blessed Are the Poor (The Sermon on the Mount)" (Dave Brubeck) - 9:04
4. "Things Ain't What They Used to Be" (Duke Ellington, Mercer Ellington, Ted Persons) - 14:55
5. "Out of the Way of the People" (Brubeck) - 6:49

CD 2

1. "The Duke" (Brubeck) - 7:51
2. "New Orleans" (Hoagy Carmichael) - 16:01
3. "Indian Song" (Brubeck) - 10:58
4. "Limehouse Blues" (Philip Braham, Douglas Furber) - 9:52
5. "St. Louis Blues" (W. C. Handy) - 6:43
6. "Basin Street Blues" (Spencer Williams) - 4:46
7. "Take Five" (Paul Desmond) - 4:00
8. "Lullaby de Mexico" (Mulligan) - 5:03

== Personnel ==
- Dave Brubeck - piano, producer
- Gerry Mulligan - baritone saxophone
- Jack Six - double bass
- Alan Dawson - drums

Production

- Russell Gloyd - compilation producer, producer
- Mark Wilder - digital mastering, mastering
- Gary Pacheco - series director
- Barry Hatcher - liner notes, project director
- Geoffrey Smith - liner notes
- Tom "Curly" Ruff - mastering
- Gina Campanaro, Robert Constanzo - packaging manager
- Hans Harzheim - photography
- Rita Cox - project director
