= Berliner Philharmonie =

German concert hall

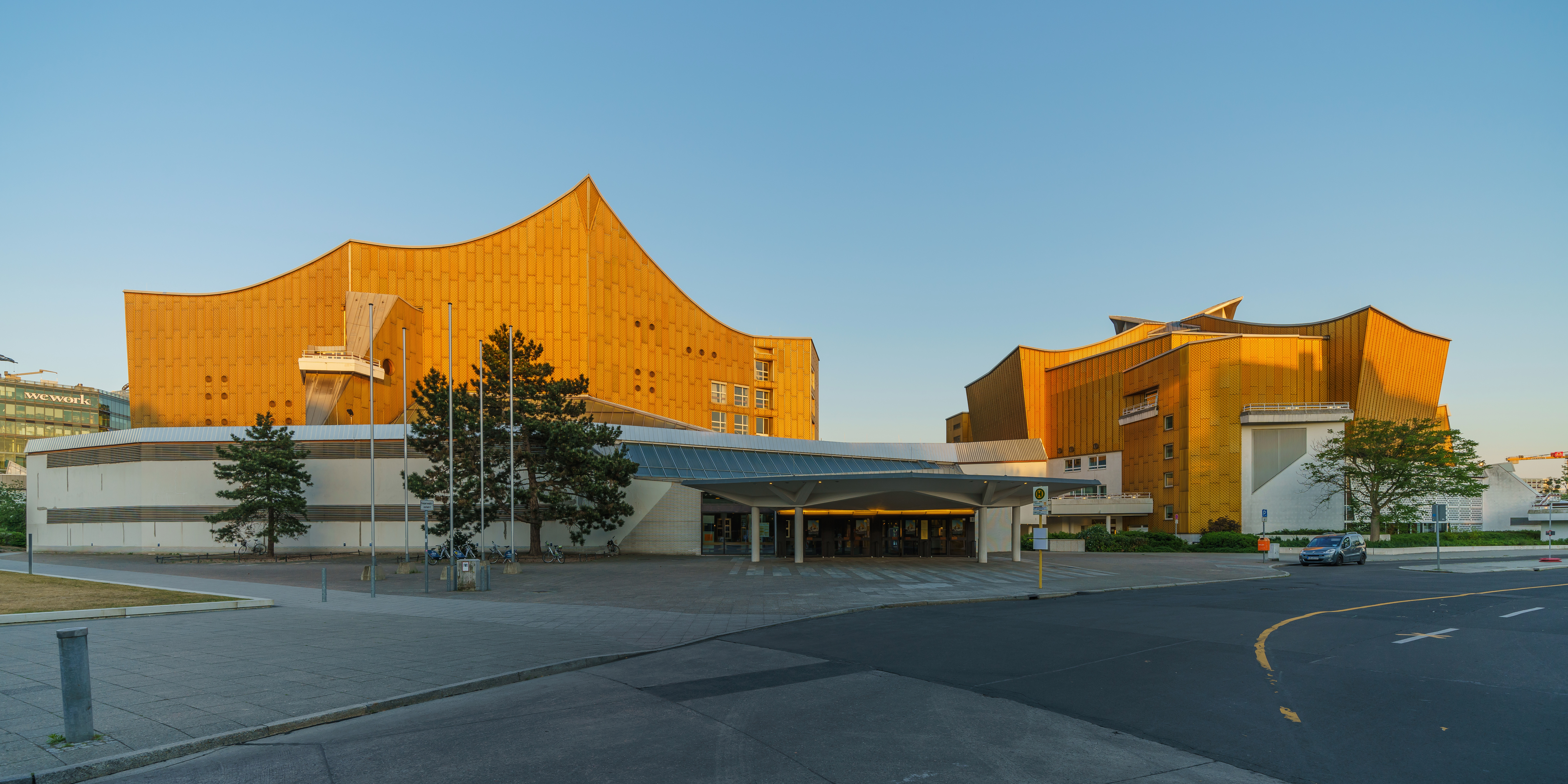
- Interactive map of the Berliner Philharmonie area

General information
- Type: Concert hall
- Location: Tiergarten, Berlin, Germany, Herbert-von-Karajan-Straße 1, 10785 Berlin
- Coordinates: 52°30′36″N 013°22′12″E
- Construction started: 1960
- Completed: 1963

The Berliner Philharmonie (German: [bɛʁˌliːnɐ fɪlhaʁmoˈniː]) is a concert hall in Berlin, Germany, and home to the Berlin Philharmonic Orchestra.

The Philharmonie lies on the south edge of the city's Tiergarten and just west of the former Berlin Wall. The Philharmonie is on Herbert-von-Karajan-Straße, named for the orchestra's longest-serving principal conductor. The building forms part of the Kulturforum complex of cultural institutions close to Potsdamer Platz.

The Philharmonie consists of two venues, the Grand Hall (Großer Saal) with 2,440 seats and the Chamber Music Hall (Kammermusiksaal) with 1,180 seats. Though conceived together, the smaller hall was opened in the 1980s, some twenty years after the main building.

== History ==
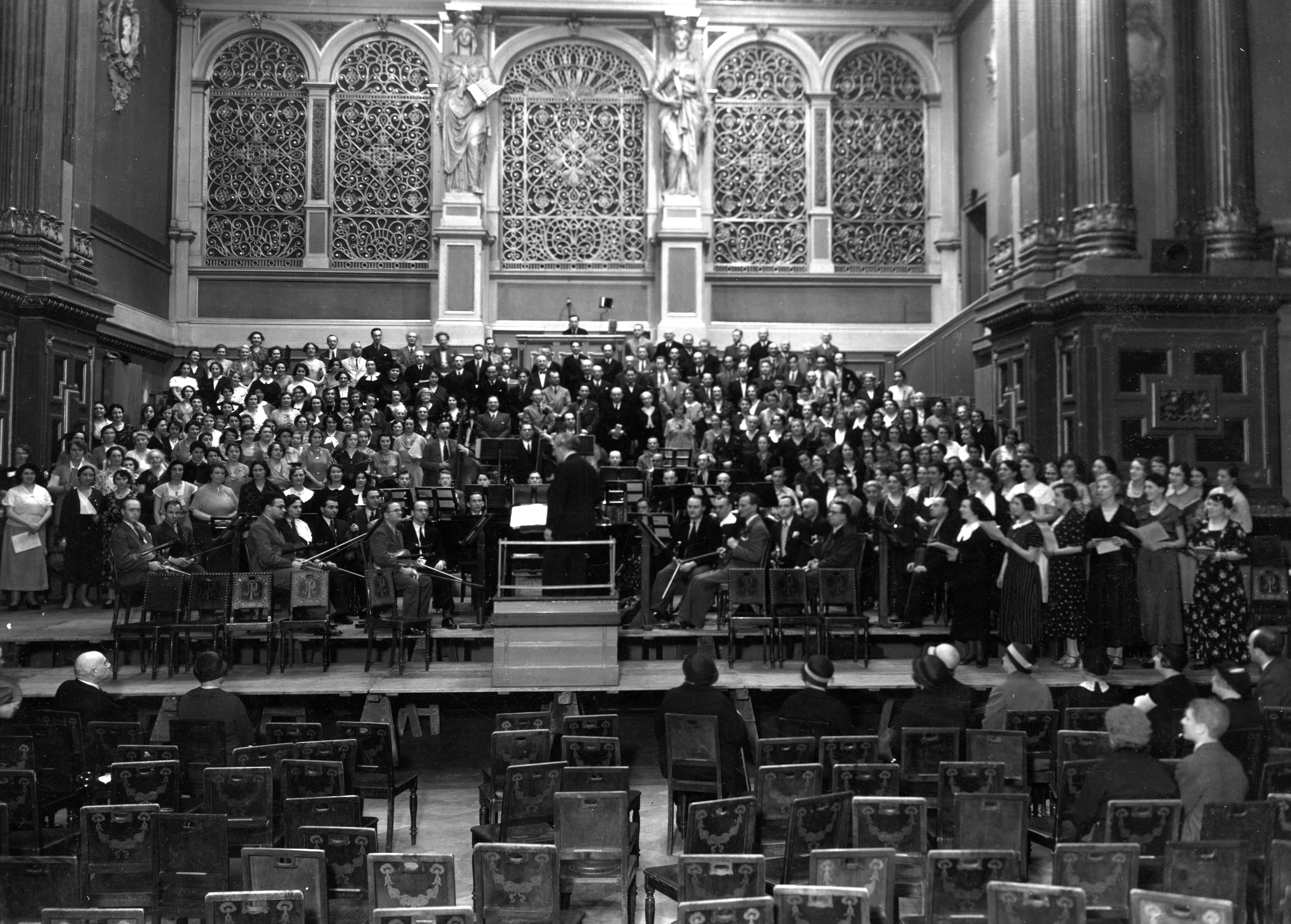
Performance of Judas Maccabaeus (Handel) by Kulturbund Deutscher Juden orchestra, in the (Bernburger Straße) Berliner Philharmonie. Conductor: Kurt Singer. 7/8 May 1934

Hans Scharoun designed the building, which was constructed over the years 1960–1963. It opened on 15 October 1963 with Herbert von Karajan conducting Beethoven's 9th Symphony. It was built to replace the old Philharmonie, destroyed by British bombers on 30 January 1944, the eleventh anniversary of Hitler becoming Chancellor. The hall is a singular building, asymmetrical and tentlike, with the main concert hall in the shape of a pentagon. The height of the rows of seats increases irregularly with distance from the stage. The stage is at the centre of the hall, surrounded by seating on all sides. The so-called vineyard-style seating arrangement (with terraces rising around a central orchestral platform) was pioneered by this building, and became a model for other concert halls, including the Sydney Opera House (1973), Denver's Boettcher Concert Hall (1978), the Gewandhaus in Leipzig (1981), Walt Disney Concert Hall in Los Angeles (2003), and the Philharmonie de Paris (2014).

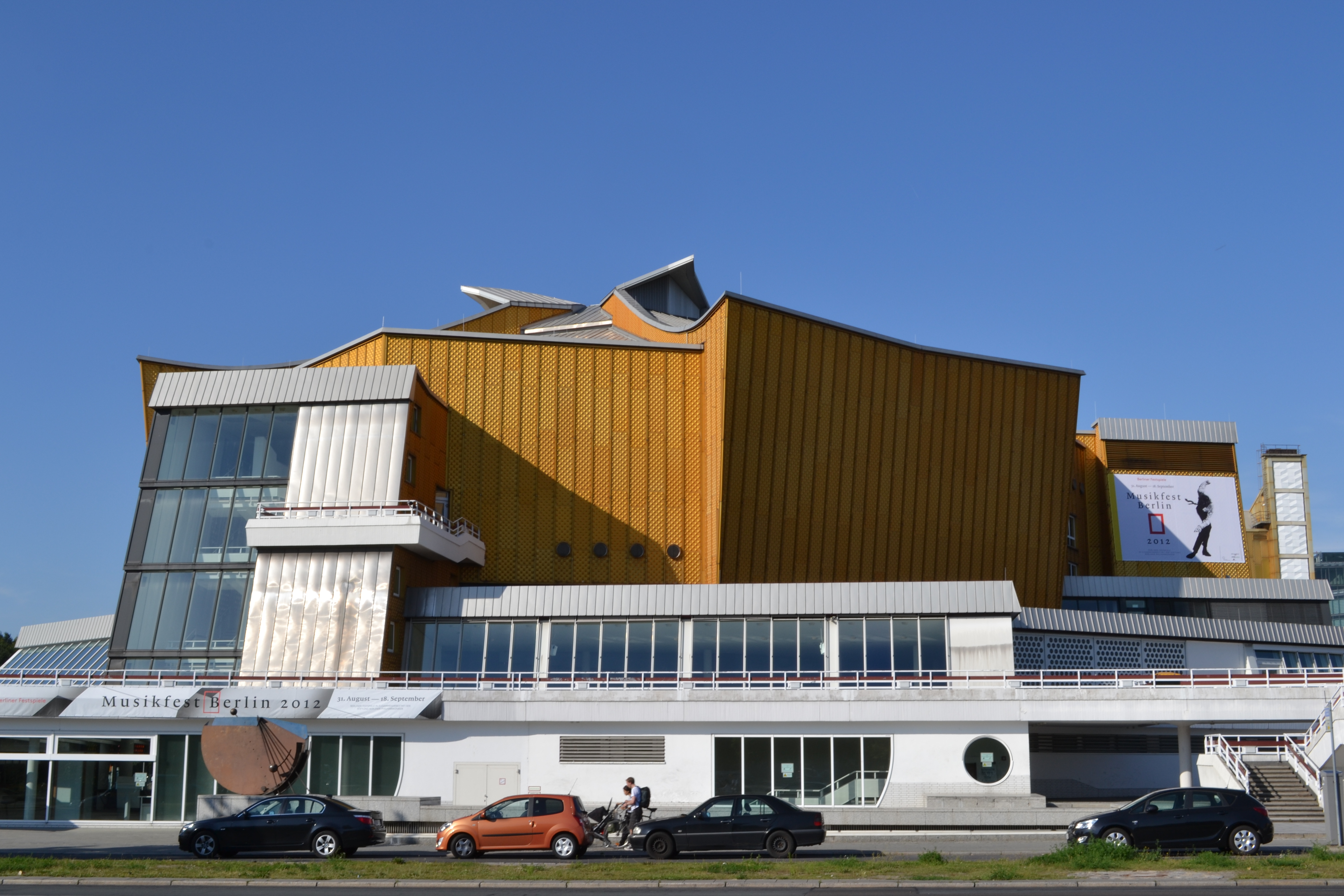
Berliner Philharmonie Concert Hall

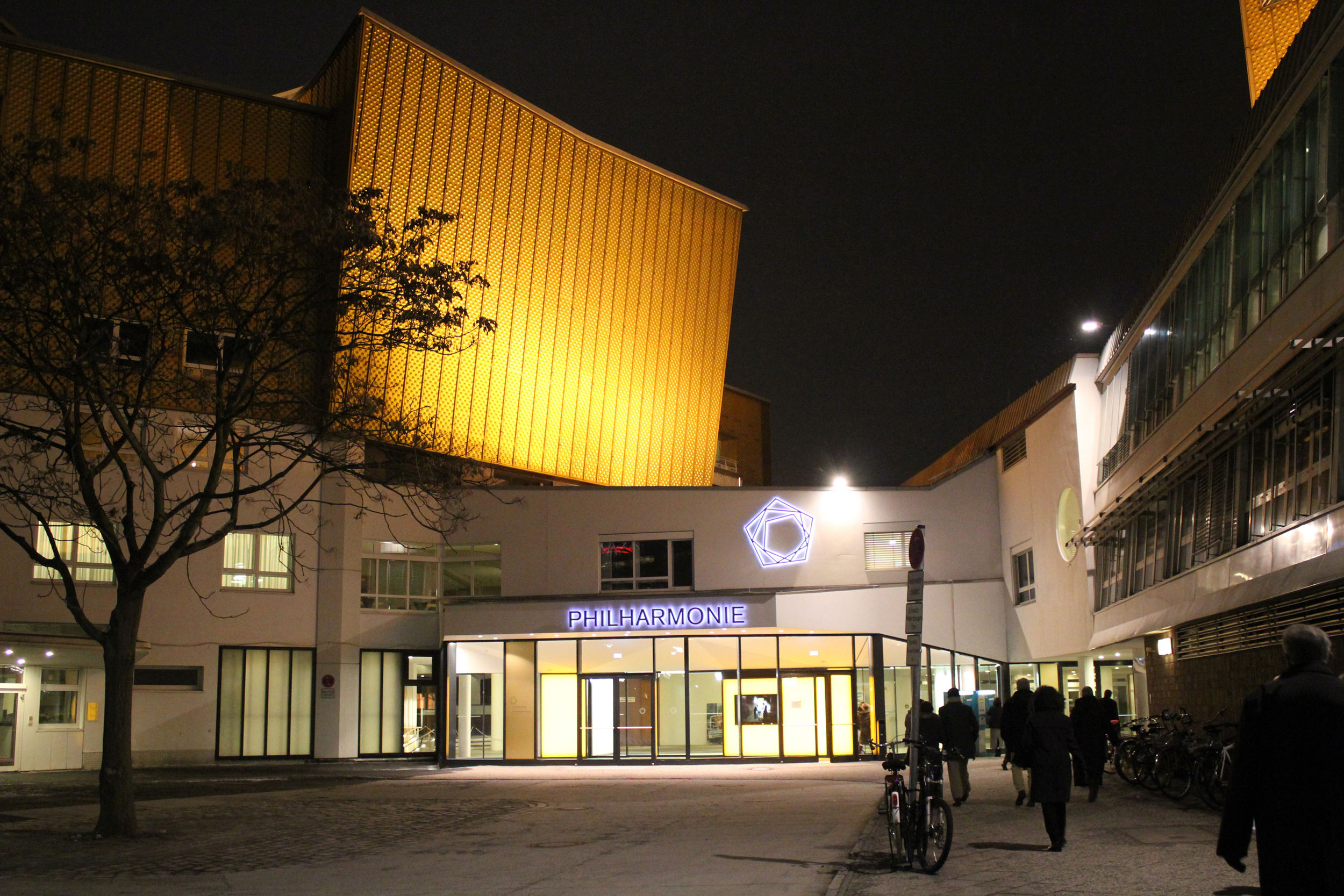
Berliner Philharmonie Concert Hall Entrance in winter

Berliner Philharmonie Concert Hall Interior

Jazz pianist Dave Brubeck and his quartet recorded three live performances at the hall; Dave Brubeck in Berlin (1964), Live at the Berlin Philharmonie (1970), and We're All Together Again for the First Time (1973). Miles Davis's 1969 live performance at the hall has also been released on DVD.

On 20 May 2008 a fire broke out at the hall. A quarter of the roof suffered considerable damage as firefighters cut openings to reach the flames beneath the roof. The hall interior sustained water damage but was otherwise "generally unharmed". Firefighters limited damage using foam. The cause of the fire was attributed to welding work, and no serious damage was caused either to the structure or interior of the building. Performances resumed, as scheduled, on 1 June 2008 with a concert by the San Francisco Symphony Youth Orchestra.

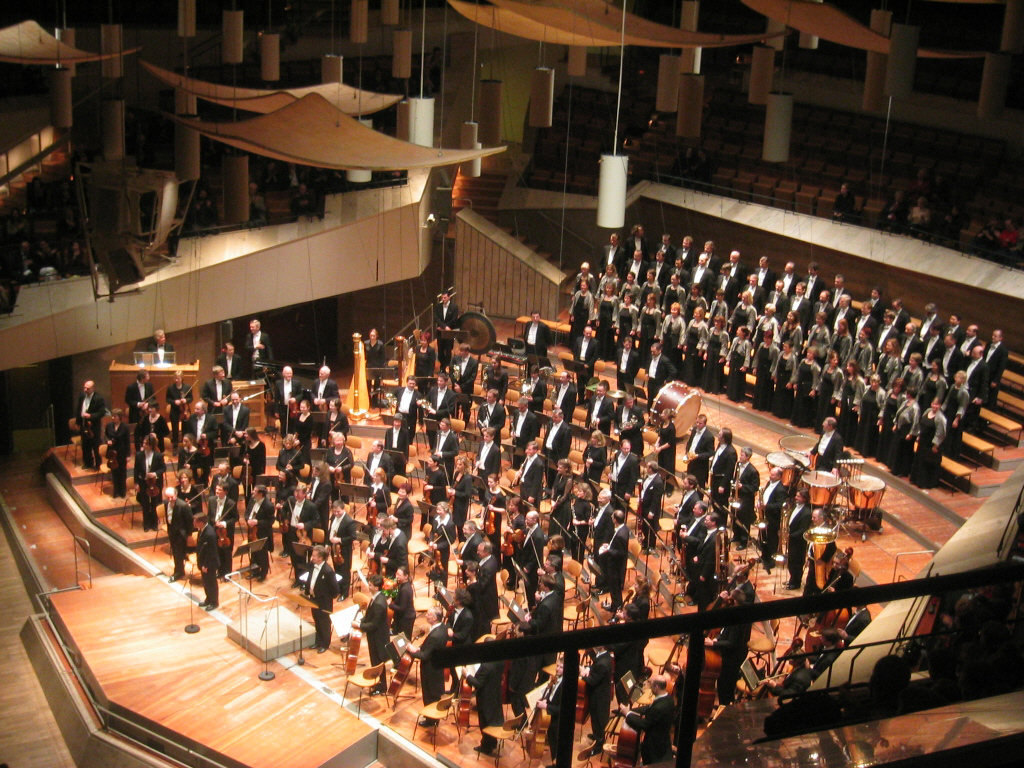
The Berlin Radio Symphony Orchestra (with chorus on the steps behind) in the Philharmonie. The audience galleries are all surrounding the concert desk (two prominent galleries are visible on the rear). From the ceiling the installations (microphones, video cameras etc.) for the livestream transmission of the concert through the Digital Concert Hall of the Berlin Philharmonic can be seen.

== Organs ==
=== Main organ ===
The main organ was built by the Karl Schuke Orgelbauwerkstatt, Berlin, in 1965, and renovated in 1992, 2012 and 2016. It has four manuals and 91 stops. The pipes of the choir organs and the Tuba 16' and Tuba 8' stops are not assigned to any group and can be played from all four manuals and the pedals.

I Main C–a^{3}
Principal	16′
Oktave	8′
Doppelflöte	8′
Rohrflöte	8′
Oktave	4′
Gedacktflöte	4′
Nassat	2 2/3′
Oktave	2′
Mixtur major VI–VIII	2′
Mixtur minor IV	2/3′
Bombarde	16′
Trompete	8′
Bassethorn	8′
Tuba (en Chamade)	16′
Tuba (en Chamade)	8′

II Positiv C–a^{3}
Quintadena	16′
Principal	8′
Spillpfeife	8′
Gedackt	8′
Oktave	4′
Blockflöte	4′
Waldflöte	2′
Sesquialtera II	2 2/3′
Nassat	1/3
Mixtur IV–VI	1 1/3′
Cymbel III	1 1/3′
Cor anglais	16′
Cromorne	8′
Tremulant

III Récit (enclosed) C–a^{3}
Bordun	16′
Holzflöte	8′
Gambe	8′
Gedackt	8′
Voix céleste	8′
Principal	4′
Flûte douce	4′
Quintflöte	2 2/3′
Nachthorn	2′
Terz	1 3/5′
Flageolett	1′
Forniture V	2 2/3′
Scharffcymbel III	1/2′
Trompete	16′
Trompete harmonique	8′
Oboe	8′
Clairon	4′
Tremulant

IV Solo (enclosed) C–a^{3}
Salicional	8′
Holzgedackt	8′
Gemshorn	8′
Principal	4′
Rohrflöte	4′
Oktave	2′
Gemshorn	2′
Terz	1 3/5′
Quinte	1 1/3′
Septime	1 1/7′
Sifflöte	1′
None	8/9′
Scharff IV–V	1′
Dulcian	16′
Voix humaine	8′
Tremulant

Pedal C–g^{1}
Gravissima	64'
Principal	32′
Flötenbass	32'
Principal	16′
Flötenbass	16′
Subbass	16′
Zartbass	16′
Oktave	8′
Gedackt	8′
Oktave	4′
Rohrpommer	4′
Bauernflöte	2′
Hintersatz VI	2 2/3′
Posaune	32′
Posaune	16′
Fagott	16′
Trompete	8′
Schalmei	4′

=== Choir organ ===
Choir organ (left)
Bourdon	16'
Principal	8′
Bourdon	8′
Gemshorn	8′
Oktave	4′
Trichterflöte	2′
Basson Hautbois	8′
Tremulant

Choir organ (right)
Flûte harmonique	8′
Salicional	8′
Prinzipalflöte	4′
Sesquialtera II	2 2/3′
Waldflöte	2′
Clarinette	8′
Tremulant

Pedal
Subbass	16′

== Resident and guest orchestras ==
The Berliner Philharmonie is the main concert venue of the Berlin Philharmonic (Berliner Philharmoniker), which performs the majority of its subscription concerts in the Grand Hall.

In addition to the resident orchestra, the hall regularly hosts performances by other orchestras, chamber ensembles, and choirs, either invited by the Berlin Philharmonic Foundation or by external promoters.

Notable orchestras and ensembles that perform regularly or frequently at the Philharmonie include:

- Berliner Symphoniker
- Deutsches Symphonie-Orchester Berlin
- Konzerthausorchester Berlin
- Rundfunk-Sinfonieorchester Berlin (Berlin Radio Symphony Orchestra)
- Sinfonie Orchester Schöneberg an amateur symphony orchestra based in Tempelhof-Schöneberg that performs twice a year in the Grand Hall, often to sold-out audiences.
- International visiting orchestras (e.g. Kyiv Symphony Orchestra, various youth and festival orchestras)

The Chamber Music Hall (Kammermusiksaal) is frequently used for smaller ensembles, recitals, and chamber orchestra performances.

=== See also ===
- List of concert halls
- Berlin Philharmonic
- List of symphony orchestras
