= Norman O'Connor =

American Catholic priest (1921–2003)

The Rev. Norman O'Connor CSP
- Born: November 20, 1921; Detroit, Michigan, U.S.
- Died: June 29, 2003 (aged 81) Wayne, New Jersey, U.S.
- Genres: Jazz
- Occupation: Catholic priest
- Instrument: Piano

Norman James O'Connor, CSP (November 20, 1921 – June 29, 2003), also known as The Jazz Priest, was an American Paulist priest known for playing and promoting jazz music.

== Biography ==
O'Connor became interested in jazz music at an early age and played piano with local jazz bands while in high school. He continued to work occasionally as a musician into the 1940s, but had abandoned the thought of music as a career by the time he enrolled at Catholic University of America in Washington, D.C. He wrote his doctoral thesis on the aesthetics of popular music.

He was ordained as a Catholic priest of the Paulist order in 1948. In 1951, he became the Catholic chaplain at Boston University. In 1954 he served on the board of the first Newport Jazz Festival and appeared at the event in his priest collar, acting as master of ceremonies for concerts and moderator of panel discussions. His introduction of John Coltrane at the festival in 1965 can be heard on Coltrane's New Thing at Newport (as well as My Favorite Things: Coltrane at Newport), and his introduction of Dave Brubeck at the 1971 festival can be heard on Brubeck's The Last Set at Newport. O'Connor also introduced Duke Ellington and the members of his orchestra (along with personal quips) at the 1956 Festival, as heard on Ellington's Ellington at Newport.

O'Connor wrote a weekly jazz column for The Boston Globe and freelanced for Down Beat, Metronome, and other music magazines. He did jazz radio shows on WGBH-FM for many years previous to, and overlapping with, the advent of TV at WGBH, in 1955. When television started, he continued in the new medium on Jazz with Father O'Connor. His guests included national jazz figures, like Cannonball Adderley and George Shearing, among others, as well as local Boston musicians like "Boots" Mussulli, Herb Pomeroy and Al and Buzzy Drootin.

In 1962, O'Connor became the director of radio and television for the Paulist Fathers in New York City. He also hosted a syndicated radio show and the local TV show, "Dial M for Music", on WCBS-TV (New York City). The show was popular in the New York area, and many great jazz musicians performed on it; including Duke Ellington (in a trio with Horace Silver and Johnny Hodges), The Modern Jazz Quartet, Thad Jones/Mel Lewis Big Band, Bill Evans, Woody Herman, Maynard Ferguson, Peggy Lee, Mongo Santamaría, Gene Krupa, and Joe Williams, among others. O'Connor became a fixture on the New York jazz scene, and remained one even after being named director of the Mount Paul Novitiate, a church training center in Oak Ridge, New Jersey, four years later.

In 1980, O'Connor was hired as the executive director of Straight and Narrow, a drug and alcohol treatment center in Paterson, New Jersey. In his later years, his profile in the jazz world became considerably lower. Nevertheless, he remained the "Jazz Priest" to the end, producing benefit concerts by Marian McPartland and other musicians for Straight and Narrow with the help of his longtime friend George Wein. O'Connor retired in 2002.

He died of a heart attack at the age of 81 in Wayne, New Jersey, on June 29, 2003.
