= Henrik Schaefer =

German conductor (born 1968)

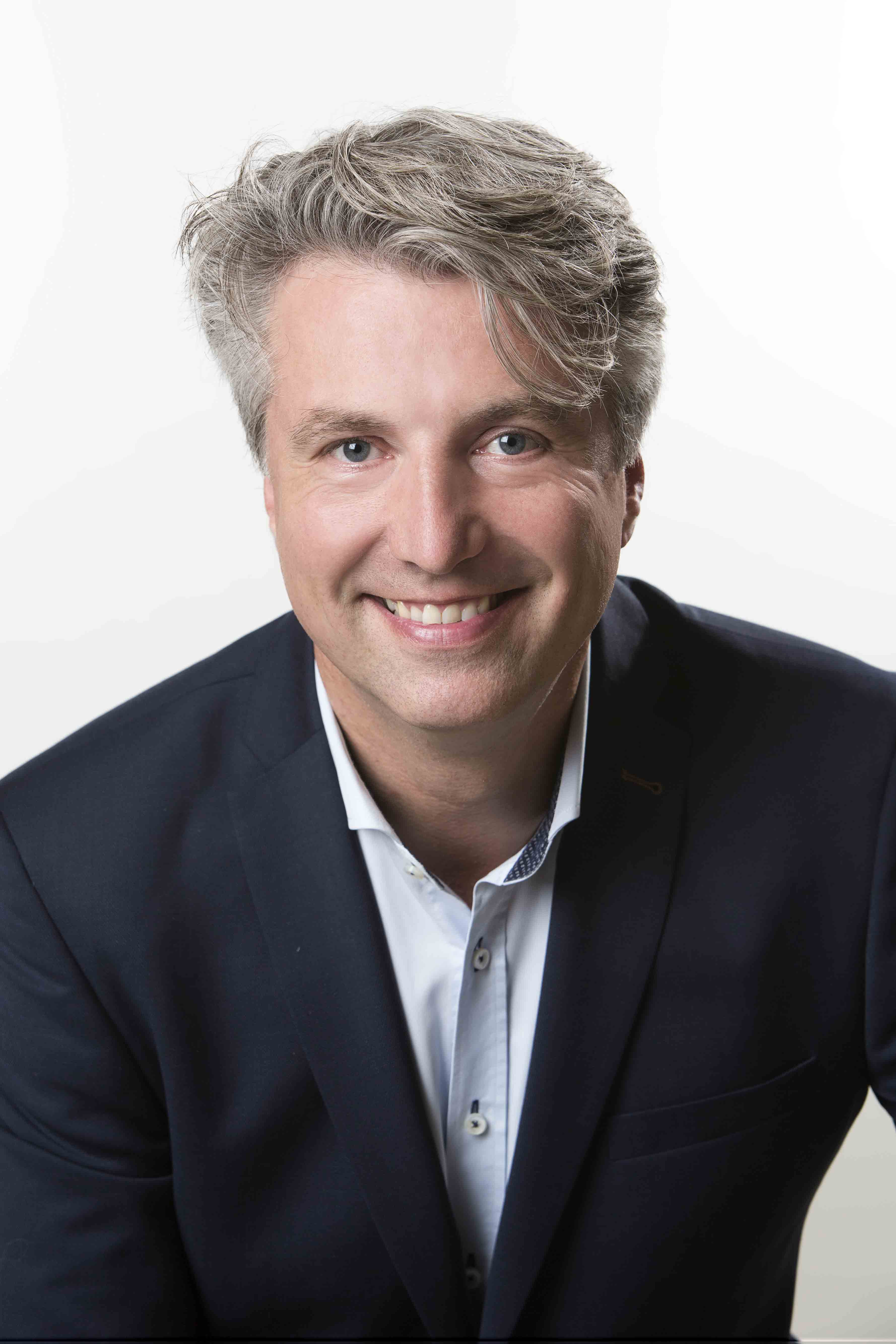
- Henrik Schaefer

Background information
- Born: April 27, 1968 (age 58); Bochum, Germany
- Genre: Classical
- Occupations: Conductor, violist
- Instrument: Viola
- Years active: 1991–present
- Website: Official website

Henrik Schaefer (born 27 April 1968 in Bochum) is a German conductor and former violist. He is Music Director of Folkoperan in Stockholm and was previously Music Director of the GöteborgsOperan (2013–2020). He is also Associate Professor of orchestral conducting at the Royal College of Music in Stockholm.

== Early life and education ==
Schaefer began playing the violin at the age of six and switched to the viola at fourteen. He studied at the Folkwang University of the Arts in Essen and later in Freiburg with Ulrich Koch, Kim Kashkashian and Johannes Lüthy. In 1991, at the age of 22, he became the youngest member of the Berlin Philharmonic (as a violist). While playing in the orchestra he studied conducting in Leipzig with Volker Rohde (1994–1998).

== Career ==
In 2000 he was appointed assistant to Claudio Abbado with the Berlin Philharmonic. During Abbado’s illness he took over numerous rehearsals, including all rehearsals for the orchestra’s production of Wagner’s Tristan und Isolde in Tokyo in December 2000, as well as work on Parsifal and Falstaff at the Salzburg Easter Festival. He also took the dress rehearsal for Abbado’s final concert as chief conductor of the Berlin Philharmonic (Mahler’s Seventh Symphony) in Vienna in May 2002. He left the orchestra in 2003 to concentrate on conducting.

From 2004 to 2011 he was Principal Guest Conductor of the Hiroshima Symphony Orchestra. From 2007 to 2013 he was Chief Conductor of the Wermland Opera in Karlstad, where his historically informed performances of the complete Ring cycle (and his debut Parsifal) received international attention. He served as Music Director of the GöteborgsOperan from 2013 to 2020. Since August 2021 he has been Music Director of Folkoperan in Stockholm.

As a guest conductor he has appeared with orchestras and opera houses including the Danish National Symphony Orchestra, Netherlands Philharmonic Orchestra, Mozarteumorchester Salzburg, Tokyo Metropolitan Symphony Orchestra, New Japan Philharmonic, Hong Kong Philharmonic, and the Volksoper Wien, as well as ensembles in Europe, Japan and the Americas.

His opera repertoire includes Mozart’s Da Ponte operas and Die Zauberflöte, Wagner’s Ring and Parsifal, works by Richard Strauss, Puccini and Verdi, and repertoire by Stenhammar and others. He has championed lesser-known Romantic works, including first recordings of music by Elfrida Andrée, Wilhelm Stenhammar (Gillet på Solhaug with the Norrköping Symphony Orchestra on the Sterling label), Joachim Raff and others. A 2003 performance of Stravinsky’s Le Sacre du Printemps with the Leipzig Ballet and Gewandhausorchester Leipzig was released on DVD.
