= The Heavyweight Champion: The Complete Atlantic Recordings =

Box set by John Coltrane
- Released: 1995
- Recorded: 1959–1961
- Genre: Jazz
- Length: 407:20
- Label: Atlantic
- Producers: Nesuhi Ertegün and Joel Dorn

The Heavyweight Champion: The Complete Atlantic Recordings is a 1995 box set by jazz musician John Coltrane. It features all of the recordings Coltrane made for Atlantic Records, spanning January 15, 1959, to May 25, 1961.

During Coltrane's Atlantic years, he made important recordings such as Giant Steps and My Favorite Things, recorded albums with Milt Jackson, Don Cherry, and Eric Dolphy and made his debut on the soprano saxophone.

== Atlantic albums ==
Coltrane recorded eight albums for Atlantic, plus two compilation albums released posthumously. See the individual articles for discussions of these albums, all of which are included in the Atlantic box:

- Giant Steps (released 1960)
- Coltrane Jazz (released 1961)
- My Favorite Things (released 1961)
- Bags and Trane [with Milt Jackson] (released 1961)
- Olé Coltrane (released 1962)
- Coltrane Plays the Blues (released 1962)
- Coltrane's Sound (released 1964)
- The Avant-Garde [with Don Cherry] (1966)
- The Coltrane Legacy (released 1970)
- Alternate Takes (released 1975)

== Outtakes ==
The seventh CD of this set features all of Coltrane's Atlantic outtakes (the rest were lost due to fire), including no fewer than 10 incomplete and alternative versions of "Giant Steps".

== Reception ==
Professional ratings
Review scores
Source	Rating
Penguin Guide to Jazz	👑
Allmusic	5/5 stars
Tom Hull	A−
Encyclopedia of Popular Music	5/5 stars

The Penguin Guide to Jazz assigned its "Crown" award to the box set, in addition to giving it a four-star rating (of a possible four). In spite of the accolade, authors Richard Cook and Brian Morton noted that the box set presents a problem for collectors who already own the constituent albums (all of which were in print at the time of the box set's release), but who are seeking the additional material only available on the seventh disc. Cook and Morton also took issue with what they deemed an "ugly title" for the set.

Allmusic gave the album a five-star rating (of a possible five). Stephen Thomas Erlewine wrote that "the scope of this music is, quite simply, breathtaking — not only was Coltrane developing at a rapid speed, but the resulting music encompasses nearly every element that made him a brilliant musician, and it is beautiful."

== Track listing ==
Original CD release The Heavyweight Champion: The Complete Atlantic Recordings , 1995 (Atlantic)

(The LP each song originally appeared on is listed in parentheses)

Disc 1

1. "Stairway to the Stars" 3:29 (The Coltrane Legacy)
2. "The Late Late Blues" 9:33 (Bags & Trane)
3. "Bags & Trane" 7:24 (Bags & Trane)
4. "Three Little Words" 7:28 (Bags & Trane)
5. "The Night We Called it a Day" 4:20 (Bags & Trane)
6. "Be-Bop" 7:58 (Bags & Trane)
7. "Blues Legacy" 9:02 (The Coltrane Legacy)
8. "Centerpiece" 7:06 (The Coltrane Legacy)
9. "Giant Steps" 3:41 (alternative)
10. "Naima" 4:28 (alternative)
11. "Like Sonny" 6:03 (alternative)

Disc 2

1. "Spiral" 5:56 (Giant Steps)
2. "Countdown" 2:21 (master) (Giant Steps)
3. "Countdown" 4:32 (alternative)
4. "Syeeda’s Song Flute" 7:00 (master) (Giant Steps)
5. "Syeeda’s Song Flute" 7:05 (alternative)
6. "Mr. P.C." 6:56 (Giant Steps)
7. "Giant Steps" (master) 4:44 (Giant Steps)
8. "Cousin Mary" (master) 5:46 (Giant Steps)
9. "Cousin Mary" 5:44 (alternative)
10. "I’ll Wait and Pray" 3:32 (master) (Coltrane Jazz)
11. "I’ll Wait and Pray" 3:25 (alternative)
12. "Little Old Lady" 4:24 (Coltrane Jazz)

Disc 3

1. "Like Sonny" (master) (Coltrane Jazz)
2. "Harmonique" (Coltrane Jazz)
3. "My Shining Hour" (Coltrane Jazz)
4. "Naima" (Giant Steps)
5. "Some Other Blues" (Coltrane Jazz)
6. "Fifth House" (Coltrane Jazz)
7. "Cherryco" (The Avant-Garde)
8. "The Blessing" (The Avant-Garde)
9. "Focus on Sanity" (The Avant-Garde)
10. "The Invisible" (The Avant-Garde)
11. "Bemsha Swing" (The Avant-Garde)

Disc 4

1. "Village Blues" (master) (Coltrane Jazz)
2. "Village Blues" (alternative)
3. "My Favorite Things" (My Favorite Things)
4. "Central Park West" (Coltrane's Sound)
5. "Mr. Syms" (Coltrane Plays the Blues)
6. "Untitled Original (exotica)" (The Coltrane Legacy)
7. "Summertime" (My Favorite Things)
8. "Body and Soul" (master) (Coltrane's Sound)
9. "Body and Soul" (alternative)
10. "Mr. Knight" (Coltrane Plays the Blues)

Disc 5

1. "Blues to Elvin" (alternative)
2. "Blues to Elvin" (master) (Coltrane Plays the Blues)
3. "Mr. Day" (Coltrane Plays the Blues)
4. "Blues to You" (alternative)
5. "Blues to You" (master) (Coltrane Plays the Blues)
6. "Blues to Bechet" (Coltrane Plays the Blues)
7. "Satellite" (Coltrane's Sound)
8. "Everytime We Say Goodbye" (My Favorite Things)
9. "26-2" (The Coltrane Legacy)
10. "But Not For Me" (My Favorite Things)

Disc 6

1. "Liberia" (Coltrane's Sound)
2. "The Night Has a Thousand Eyes" (Coltrane's Sound)
3. "Equinox" (Coltrane's Sound)
4. "Olé" (Olé Coltrane)
5. "Dahomey Dance" (Olé Coltrane)
6. "Aisha" (Olé Coltrane)
7. "Original Untitled Ballad (To Her Ladyship)" (The Coltrane Legacy)

Disc 7 (outtakes)

- 1–7 – "Giant Steps"
- 8–12 – "Naima"
- 13–20 – "Like Sonny"
- 21–22 – "Giant Steps"
- 23–24 – "Blues to Elvin"
- 25 – "Blues to You"

== Personnel ==
Recorded between January 15, 1959, and May 25, 1961, in New York City.

- John Coltrane — tenor saxophone/soprano saxophone
- Milt Jackson — vibes (disc 1: 1–8)
- Don Cherry — trumpet (disc 3: 7–11)
- Freddie Hubbard — trumpet (disc 6: 4–7)
- Eric Dolphy — flute/alto saxophone (disc 6: 4–7)
- Hank Jones — piano (disc 1: 1–8)
- Cedar Walton — piano (disc 1: 9–11; disc 7: 1–20)
- Tommy Flanagan — piano (disc 2: 1–9; disc 7: 21–22)
- McCoy Tyner — piano (disc 4: 1–10; disc 5: 1–3, 8–10; disc 6: 1–4)
- Wynton Kelly — piano (disc 2: 10–12; disc 3: 1–6)
- Paul Chambers — bass (disc 1: 1–11; disc 2: 1–12; disc 3: 1–6; disc 7: 1–22)
- Charlie Haden — bass (disc 3: 7–8)
- Percy Heath — bass (disc 3: 9–11)
- Steve Davis — bass (disc 4: 1–10; disc 5: 1–10; disc 6: 1–3; disc 7: 23–25)
- Art Davis — bass (disc 4: 4,5,7)
- Reggie Workman — bass (disc 3: 4–7)
- Connie Kay — drums (disc 1: 1–8)
- Lex Humphries — drums (disc 1: 9–11; disc 7: 1–20)
- Art Taylor — drums (disc 2: 1–9; disc 7: 21–22)
- Jimmy Cobb — drums (disc 2: 10–12; disc 3: 1–6)
- Ed Blackwell — drums (disc 3: 7–11)
- Elvin Jones — drums (disc 4: 1–10; disc 5: 1–10; disc 6: 1–7; disc 7: 23–25)
