= The Coltrane Legacy =

Compilation album by John Coltrane
- Released: April 1970
- Recorded: January 15, 1959; October 24 & 26, 1960; May 25, 1961
- Genre: Jazz
- Label: Atlantic Records
- Producer: Nesuhi Ertegun

The Coltrane Legacy is a compilation album credited to jazz musician John Coltrane, released in 1970 on Atlantic Records, catalogue SD 1553. Issued posthumously, it consists of outtakes from recording sessions which yielded the albums Olé Coltrane, Coltrane Plays the Blues, Coltrane's Sound, and Bags & Trane. All selections were previously unreleased.

The album received a Grammy nomination for Best Jazz Performance.

== Reception ==
Professional ratings
Review scores
Source	Rating
AllMusic	3/5 stars
DownBeat	2.5/5 stars
The Rolling Stone Jazz Record Guide	3/5 stars

In a review for AllMusic, Scott Yanow wrote: "When this LP was released in 1970, it debuted some valuable Coltrane recordings covering a two-year period... Historically significant music, it's generally quite enjoyable."

== Track listing ==
All tracks by John Coltrane except as indicated.

=== Side one ===
1. "26-2" – 6:13
2. "Original Untitled Ballad (To Her Ladyship)" (Billy Frazier) – 8:58
3. "Untitled Original (Exotica)" – 5:22

=== Side two ===
1. "Centerpiece" (Sweets Edison, Bill Tennyson) – 7:05
2. "Stairway to the Stars" (Matty Malneck, Mitchell Parish, Frank Signorelli) – 3:58
3. "Blues Legacy" (Milt Jackson) – 9:00

== Personnel ==
- John Coltrane – soprano, alto, and tenor saxophone
- Freddie Hubbard – trumpet on "Original Untitled Ballad"
- Eric Dolphy – flute on "Original Untitled Ballad"
- Milt Jackson – vibraphone on side two
- McCoy Tyner – piano on side one
- Hank Jones – piano on side two
- Paul Chambers – bass on side two
- Steve Davis – bass on "26-2" and "Untitled Original"
- Art Davis – bass on "Original Untitled Ballad"
- Elvin Jones – drums on side one
- Connie Kay – drums on side two
