= Coltrane Jazz =

Studio album by John Coltrane
- Released: January or February 1961
- Recorded: March 26, 1959; November 24, 1959; December 2, 1959; October 21, 1960
- Studios: Atlantic Studios; New York City
- Genre: Jazz
- Length: 38:51 original LP; 63:00 CD reissue
- Labels: Atlantic; SD 1354
- Producer: Nesuhi Ertegün

John Coltrane chronology
Giant Steps (1960)	Coltrane Jazz (1961)	Lush Life (1961)

Professional ratings
Review scores
Source	Rating
AllMusic	4.5/5 stars
The Encyclopedia of Popular Music	4/5 stars
The Penguin Guide to Jazz	4/4 stars
The Rolling Stone Jazz Record Guide	5/5 stars
DownBeat	4.5/5 stars

Coltrane Jazz is a studio album by the jazz musician John Coltrane. It was released in early 1961 on Atlantic Records. Most of the album features Coltrane playing with his former Miles Davis bandmates, pianist Wynton Kelly, bassist Paul Chambers and drummer Jimmy Cobb during two sessions in November and December, 1959. The exception is the track "Village Blues", which was recorded October 21, 1960. "Village Blues" comes from the first recording session featuring Coltrane playing with pianist McCoy Tyner and drummer Elvin Jones, who toured and recorded with Coltrane as part of his celebrated "classic quartet" from 1960 to 1965.

== Background ==
In 1959, Miles Davis' business manager Harold Lovett negotiated a contract for Coltrane with Atlantic, the terms including a $7000 annual guarantee. After having recorded most of Giant Steps in May of that year, Coltrane started having bridge problems, and did not return to a recording studio for six months. When he returned to the studio in November and December for the Coltrane Jazz recording sessions, he employed the rhythm section from the Miles Davis Quintet. The sessions yielded the bulk of Coltrane Jazz, and the track "Naima," which was included on the Giant Steps album. "Like Sonny," a tribute to colleague Sonny Rollins, is based on a melodic figure that Sonny Rollins can be heard playing at 3:22 during his solo on "My Old Flame" on Kenny Dorham's 1957 album Jazz Contrasts. (Coltrane made one further studio recording of "Like Sonny" in September 1960 for Roulette Records, who issued the piece under the title "Simple Like" in 1962 on the album "The Best of Birdland: Volume 1".)

After leaving Davis's band in the spring of 1960, Coltrane formed his first touring quartet for a residency at the Jazz Gallery club in Manhattan. Coltrane initially hired pianist Steve Kuhn and drummer Pete "La Roca" Sims for his group, along with bassist Steve Davis, but by September, the quartet's rhythm section consisted of Tyner, Jones, and Davis. This group entered the studio on October 21, recording "Village Blues" at the beginning of the week of sessions that produced Coltrane's My Favorite Things album.

On June 20, 2000, Rhino Records reissued Coltrane Jazz as part of its Atlantic 50th Anniversary Jazz Gallery series. Included were four bonus tracks, two of which had appeared in 1975 on the Atlantic compilation Alternate Takes, the remaining pair earlier issued on The Heavyweight Champion: The Complete Atlantic Recordings in 1995. Two bonus tracks, the alternate versions of "Like Sonny", had been recorded at the March 26, 1959 sessions that were not used for Giant Steps.

== Track listing ==
All tracks are written by John Coltrane except as noted.

Side one
No.	Title	Writer(s)	Date recorded	Length
1.	"Little Old Lady"	Hoagy Carmichael; Stanley Adams	November 24, 1959	4:28
2.	"Village Blues"		October 21, 1960	5:23
3.	"My Shining Hour"	Harold Arlen; Johnny Mercer	December 2, 1959	4:54
4.	"Fifth House"		December 2, 1959	4:44

Side two
No.	Title	Writer(s)	Date recorded	Length
1.	"Harmonique"		December 2, 1959	4:13
2.	"Like Sonny"		December 2, 1959	5:54
3.	"I'll Wait and Pray"	George Treadwell; Jerry Valentine	November 24, 1959	3:35
4.	"Some Other Blues"		December 2, 1959	5:40

=== 2000 reissue bonus tracks ===
No.	Title	Writer(s)	Date recorded	Length
9.	"Like Sonny" (alternate version 1)		March 26, 1959	6:07
10.	"I'll Wait and Pray" (alternate take)	Treadwell; Valentine	November 24, 1959	3:30
11.	"Like Sonny" (alternate version 2)		March 26, 1959	8:15
12.	"Village Blues" (alternate take)		October 21, 1960	6:17

== Personnel ==
=== March 26, 1959 ("Like Sonny") ===
- John Coltrane – tenor saxophone
- Cedar Walton – piano
- Paul Chambers – bass
- Lex Humphries – drums

=== November 24, 1959 & December 2, 1959 ===
- John Coltrane – tenor saxophone
- Wynton Kelly – piano
- Paul Chambers – bass
- Jimmy Cobb – drums

=== October 21, 1960 ("Village Blues") ===
- John Coltrane – tenor saxophone
- McCoy Tyner – piano
- Steve Davis – bass
- Elvin Jones – drums

=== Production ===
- Nesuhi Ertegün – production
- Tom Dowd, Phil Iehle – engineering
- Lee Friedlander – photography
- Eutemey – cover design
- Zita Carno – liner notes
- Patrick Milligan – reissue supervision
- Dan Hersch – digital remastering
- Rachel Gutek – reissue design
- Hugh Brown – reissue art direction
- Neil Tessler – reissue liner notes
- Vanessa Atkins – reissue editorial supervision
- Shawn Amos – reissue editorial coordination
