= Africa/Brass =

Studio album by John Coltrane
- Released: September 1, 1961
- Recorded: May 23 and June 7, 1961
- Studios: Van Gelder Studio; Englewood Cliffs, New Jersey
- Genres: Jazz; modal jazz
- Length: 33:50
- Label: Impulse!
- Producer: Creed Taylor

John Coltrane chronology
Bags & Trane (1961)	Africa/Brass (1961)	Olé Coltrane (1961)

Professional ratings
Review scores
Source	Rating
AllMusic	4.5/5 stars
Down Beat (Original Lp release)	2/5 stars
Jazz Shelf	favorable
The Rolling Stone Jazz Record Guide	3/5 stars
Tom Hull	A−
Encyclopedia of Popular Music	4/5 stars

Africa/Brass is a studio album by the jazz saxophonist and composer John Coltrane. It was released on September 1, 1961 through Impulse! Records. Coltrane's working quartet is augmented by a larger ensemble that brings the total to twenty-one musicians. Its big band sound, with the unusual instrumentation of French horns and euphonium, presented music very different from anything that had been associated with Coltrane to date. While critics originally gave it poor ratings, more recent jazz commentators have described it as "amazing" and as a "key work in understanding the path that John Coltrane's music took in its final phases." It is Coltrane's first release for Impulse!.

== Background ==
In 1961, Coltrane came into his own as a front-rank force in jazz, his influence growing from years of live performances with Thelonious Monk, Miles Davis and leading his own groups, and from the impact of the albums Giant Steps and My Favorite Things. Impulse Records executive Creed Taylor bought out Coltrane's contract with Atlantic Records, making Coltrane the first artist to be signed to the new company's roster. It was the best contract a jazz musician had ever received after Davis with Columbia, one year followed by two-year options for two albums per year with a $10,000 advance against royalties the first year rising to a $20,000 advance for the second and third years. Backed by the resources of ABC Records and set up to be an instant major player in the jazz market, Impulse! offered him greater scope. Coltrane would remain with Impulse! the rest of his life, and to inaugurate his move to the new label he planned a large-group recording.

Coltrane had not been in a recording studio as a leader since the October 1960 sessions for My Favorite Things, although on March 20 and 21, 1961, he had made a last recorded contribution for Davis, guesting on two tracks for Someday My Prince Will Come. Earlier in 1961, Coltrane had invited multi-instrumentalist Eric Dolphy to join his band, making it a quintet. Around the same time, bassist Steve Davis departed, replaced by Reggie Workman, at times Coltrane pairing him with a second bassist, Art Davis. With this group in tow, on May 23 Coltrane entered the new Van Gelder Studio in Englewood Cliffs, New Jersey, for the first time; Rudy Van Gelder had been the sound engineer for most of his earlier sessions with Prestige Records. Coltrane would make the bulk of his recordings at the Van Gelder studio for the remainder of his career.

== Content ==
Apparently, Coltrane had initially contacted Gil Evans to assist with the arrangements; however nothing came of this and Coltrane called on Dolphy and Tyner to orchestrate. Originally credited to Dolphy alone on the initial release, that has been corrected with the appearance of the 1995 reissue. Coltrane chose the traditional English folk ballad "Greensleeves," arranged in a similar major/minor contrast as his popular "My Favorite Things." For the two original pieces, "Africa" and "Blues Minor," Dolphy and Coltrane adapted Tyner's piano voicings for the orchestra. A second set of recording sessions for the album took place on June 7.

In 1974, Impulse released a second album culled from the same sessions, The Africa/Brass Sessions, Volume 2. Two additional outtakes appeared on another posthumous Coltrane compilation, Trane's Modes. On October 10, 1995, Impulse released the complete sessions on a two-disc set entitled The Complete Africa/Brass Sessions. Rather than placing the original album on one disc and the outtakes on the other, it divides the disc content by session, with the May 23 results on the first disc and those from June 7 on the second disc.

== Reception and influence ==
In a contemporaneous review that appeared in the January 18, 1962, issue of DownBeat magazine critic Martin Williams had this to say: "In these pieces, Coltrane has done on record what he has done so often in person lately, make everything into a handful of chords, frequently only two or three, turning them in every conceivable way..."

The album impressed minimal music composer Steve Reich, who said "the whole 30 minutes are in E. You know how jazz men talk about the changes? 'What’s the change?' 'E.' 'No, no, no, what’s the changes?' 'E!' E for half an hour. 'Wait a minute, come on, E for half an hour?'".

Roger McGuinn of the Byrds was greatly inspired by Africa/Brass. His 12-string guitar playing on the Byrds' 1966 album Fifth Dimension shows strong signs of Coltrane's influence, most famously on the single "Eight Miles High," which was itself a major influence on the psychedelic rock sound that would dominate much of the late ’60s.

== Track listing ==
=== Original release ===
All tracks are written by John Coltrane except as noted.

Side one
No.	Title	Length
1.	"Africa"	16:28
Total length:		16:28

Side two
No.	Title	Writer(s)	Length
1.	"Greensleeves"	Traditional; McCoy Tyner (arr.)	10:00
2.	"Blues Minor"		7:22
Total length:			17:22 33:50

=== The Complete Africa/Brass Sessions ===
Disc 1 recorded May 23, 1961. Disc 2 recorded June 7, 1961.

All tracks are written by John Coltrane except as noted.

Disc one
No.	Title	Writer(s)	Length
1.	"Greensleeves" (original issue)	Traditional	10:00
2.	"Song of the Underground Railroad" (issued on Africa/Brass Sessions Vol. 2)	Trad.	6:44
3.	"Greensleeves" (alternate take issued on Africa/Brass Sessions Vol. 2)	Trad.	10:53
4.	"The Damned Don't Cry" (issued on Trane's Modes)	Calvin Massey	7:34
5.	"Africa" (first version issued on Trane's Modes)		14:08

Disc two
No.	Title	Length
1.	"Blues Minor" (original issue)	7:20
2.	"Africa" (alternate take issued on Africa/Brass Sessions Vol. 2)	16:08
3.	"Africa" (original issue)	16:29

== Personnel ==
- John Coltrane – soprano and tenor saxophone
- Booker Little – trumpet
- Julius Watkins, Bob Northern, Robert Swisshelm – french horn
- Bill Barber – tuba
- Pat Patrick – baritone saxophone
- Eric Dolphy – alto saxophone, bass clarinet, flute
- McCoy Tyner – piano
- Reggie Workman – bass
- Elvin Jones – drums

May 23 session only ("Greensleeves")

- Freddie Hubbard – trumpet
- Julian Priester, Charles Greenlee – euphonium
- Jim Buffington – french horn
- Garvin Bushell – piccolo, woodwinds
- Paul Chambers – bass

June 7 session only ("Africa" and "Blues Minor")

- Britt Woodman – trombone
- Donald Corrado – French Horn
- Carl Bowman – euphonium
- Art Davis – bass on "Africa"

=== Production ===
- Creed Taylor – production
- Rudy Van Gelder – audio engineering
- Eric Dolphy, McCoy Tyner – orchestration
- Romulus Franceschini – orchestration on "The Damned Don't Cry"
- Dom Cerulli – liner notes
- Pete Turner – photography
- Michael Cuscuna – reissue production
- David A. Wild – reissue liner notes
- Hollis King – reissue art direction
- Jackie Thaw – reissue graphic design

== Charts ==
Chart performance for Africa/Brass
Chart (2026)	Peak position
US Top Jazz Albums (Billboard)	25
