= Coltrane Plays the Blues =

Studio album by John Coltrane
- Released: July 1962
- Recorded: October 24, 1960
- Studio: Atlantic (New York City)
- Genre: Jazz
- Length: 41:07 original LP
- Labels: Atlantic; SD 1382
- Producer: Nesuhi Ertegün

John Coltrane chronology
Live! at the Village Vanguard (1962)	Coltrane Plays the Blues (1962)	Coltrane (1962)

Coltrane Plays the Blues is an album of music by the jazz musician John Coltrane. It was released in July 1962 by Atlantic Records. It was recorded at Atlantic Studios during the sessions for My Favorite Things, assembled after Coltrane had stopped recording for the label and was under contract to Impulse Records. Like Prestige Records before them, as Coltrane's fame grew during the 1960s, Atlantic used unissued recordings and released them without either Coltrane's input or approval.

On September 19, 2000, Rhino Records reissued Coltrane Plays the Blues as part of its Atlantic 50th Anniversary Jazz Gallery series. Included were five bonus tracks, all of which had appeared in 1995 on The Heavyweight Champion: The Complete Atlantic Recordings.

== Reception ==
Professional ratings
Review scores
Source	Rating
AllMusic	4.5/5 stars
DownBeat	3.5/5 stars
The Encyclopedia of Popular Music	4/5 stars
The Penguin Guide to Jazz	4/4 stars
The Rolling Stone Jazz Record Guide	4/5 stars

Coltrane biographer Ben Ratliff wrote: "Coltrane Plays the Blues... turned out to be one of the great records in jazz. It was nevertheless overshadowed by other material he recorded during the same sessions..."

Coltrane biographer Eric Nisenson remarked: "It is not known if Coltrane intended to make what is now known as a 'concept' album, but listening to these six tracks is like a journey through the blues, from the most primitive to the 'world beat' blues... there is nothing atavistic in Coltrane's playing; as deeply funky as it is, it is still searching new music, as personally Coltranesque as anything he ever recorded, simultaneously old, thoroughly modern, and perfectly beautiful... On Coltrane Plays the Blues the saxophonist had clearly made the heady discovery that the blues had some vital connection with music from exotic places all over the world, all of which had been created through a similar need of the heart."

In a review for AllMusic, Richie Unterberger commented: "Coltrane's sessions for Atlantic in late October 1960 were prolific... My Favorite Things was destined to be the most remembered and influential of these, and while Coltrane Plays the Blues is not as renowned or daring in material, it is still a powerful session. As for the phrase 'plays the blues' in the title, that's not an indicator that the tunes are conventional blues (they aren't). It's more indicative of a bluesy sensibility, whether he is playing muscular saxophone or... the more unusual sounding (at the time) soprano sax."

The authors of The Penguin Guide to Jazz wrote that the album is "often overlooked", and stated: "Much of the interest lies in Tyner's withdrawal from some of the numbers, a first experiment with a pianoless trio since Prestige days. Here once again simplicity of statement and sophistication of harmonic structure lie in fertile balance."

Writing about the Rhino reissue for All About Jazz, Mike Perciaccante stated: "This is one of the least well known Coltrane albums, partly because it is an all blues format and partly because it was released at the end of his association with Atlantic records... It is the beginning of his work with Tyner and Jones in quartet form. For that alone this recording would be important... Long-time Coltrane fans will fall in love with the clean, crisp sound. New fans will be afforded a great opportunity to be introduced to the master's work on this timeless album."

== Track listing ==
=== Side one ===
No.	Title	Writer(s)	Length
1.	"Blues to Elvin"	Elvin Jones	7:53
2.	"Blues to Bechet"	John Coltrane	5:46
3.	"Blues to You"	John Coltrane	6:29

=== Side two ===
No.	Title	Writer(s)	Length
1.	"Mr. Day"	John Coltrane	7:56
2.	"Mr. Syms"	John Coltrane	5:22
3.	"Mr. Knight"	John Coltrane	7:31

=== 2000 reissue bonus tracks ===
No.	Title	Writer(s)	Length
7.	"Untitled Original (Exotica)"	John Coltrane	5:22
8.	"Blues to Elvin" (alternate take 1)	Elvin Jones	11:00
9.	"Blues to Elvin" (alternate take 3)	Elvin Jones	5:59
10.	"Blues to You" (alternate take 1)	John Coltrane	5:35
11.	"Blues to You" (alternate take 2)	John Coltrane	5:36

Side Two track 2 recorded during the afternoon of October 24, 1960; the remainder during the night of the same day.

== Personnel ==
- John Coltrane — soprano saxophone on "Blues to Bechet", "Mr. Syms", and “Untitled Original (Exotica)”; tenor saxophone on all others
- McCoy Tyner — piano except on “Blues to Bechet” and “Blues to You”
- Steve Davis — bass
- Elvin Jones — drums

=== Production personnel ===
- Nesuhi Ertegün — production
- Tom Dowd — engineering
- Marty Norman - Bob Slutzky Graphics — cover design
- Joe Goldberg — liner notes
- Patrick Milligan — reissue supervision
- Dan Hersch — digital remastering
- Sevie Bates — reissue art direction
- Neil Tesser — reissue liner notes
- Vanessa Atkins — reissue editorial supervision
- Shawn Amos — reissue editorial coordination
