= My Favorite Things (John Coltrane album) =

Studio album by John Coltrane
- Released: March 1961
- Recorded: October 21, 24, & 26, 1960
- Genre: Modal jazz
- Length: 40:25
- Label: Atlantic
- Producer: Nesuhi Ertegün

John Coltrane chronology
Lush Life (1961)	My Favorite Things (1961)	Bags & Trane (1961)

My Favorite Things is a studio album by the jazz musician John Coltrane. It was released in March 1961 on Atlantic Records. It was the first album to feature Coltrane playing soprano saxophone. An edited version of the title track became a hit single that gained popularity in 1961 on radio. The record became a major commercial success.

== Background ==
In March 1960, while on tour in Europe, Miles Davis purchased a soprano saxophone for Coltrane. While the instrument had been used in the early days of jazz (notably by Sidney Bechet) it had become rare by the 1950s with the exception of Steve Lacy. Intrigued by its capabilities, Coltrane began playing it at his summer club dates.

After leaving the Davis band, Coltrane, for his first regular bookings at New York's Jazz Gallery in the summer of 1960, assembled the first version of the John Coltrane Quartet. The lineup settled by autumn with McCoy Tyner on piano, Steve Davis on bass, and Elvin Jones on drums. Sessions the week before Halloween at Atlantic Studios yielded the track "Village Blues" for Coltrane Jazz and the entirety of this album along with the tracks that Atlantic later assembled into Coltrane Plays the Blues (1962) and Coltrane's Sound (1964).

According to Lewis Porter's biography, Coltrane described "My Favorite Things" as "my favorite piece of all those I have recorded".

== Music ==
The title track is a modal rendition of the Rodgers and Hammerstein song "My Favorite Things" from The Sound of Music. The melody is heard numerous times throughout, but instead of playing solos over the written chord changes, both Tyner and Coltrane take extended solos over vamps of the two tonic chords, E minor and E major (whereas the original resolves to G major), played in waltz time. In the documentary The World According to John Coltrane, narrator Ed Wheeler remarks on the impact that this song's popularity had on Coltrane's career:

In 1960, Coltrane left Miles [Davis] and formed his own quartet to further explore modal playing, freer directions, and a growing Indian influence. They transformed "My Favorite Things", the cheerful populist song from 'The Sound of Music,' into a hypnotic eastern dervish dance. The recording was a hit and became Coltrane's most requested tune—and a bridge to broad public acceptance.

The album is also notable for Coltrane's arrangement of the George Gershwin standard "But Not for Me" which showcases the Coltrane changes technique, as heard on "Giant Steps" and "Countdown".

On March 3, 1998, Rhino Records reissued My Favorite Things as part of its Atlantic 50th Anniversary Jazz Gallery series. Included as bonus tracks were both sides of the "My Favorite Things" single, released as Atlantic 5012 in 1961.

== Reception ==
Professional ratings
Review scores
Source	Rating
AllMusic	5/5 stars
The Encyclopedia of Popular Music	4/5 stars
Tom Hull	A−
The Penguin Guide to Jazz	4/4 stars
The Rolling Stone Jazz Record Guide	5/5 stars

In 1998, the album received the Grammy Hall of Fame award. It attained gold record status in 2018, having sold 500,000 copies.

In 2000 it was voted number 392 in Colin Larkin's All Time Top 1000 Albums.

== Track listing ==
Side one
No.	Title	Writer(s)	Length
1.	"My Favorite Things"	Oscar Hammerstein II, Richard Rodgers	13:41
2.	"Ev'ry Time We Say Goodbye"	Cole Porter	5:39

Side two
No.	Title	Writer(s)	Length
1.	"Summertime"	Ira Gershwin, DuBose Heyward, George Gershwin	11:31
2.	"But Not for Me"	Ira Gershwin, George Gershwin	9:34
Total length:			40:25

1998 reissue bonus tracks
No.	Title	Writer(s)	Length
5.	"My Favorite Things, Part 1" (single A-side)	Rodgers and Hammerstein	2:45
6.	"My Favorite Things, Part 2" (single B-side)	Rodgers and Hammerstein	3:02

== Personnel ==
- John Coltrane – soprano saxophone on side one and bonus tracks; tenor saxophone on side two
- McCoy Tyner – piano
- Steve Davis – double bass
- Elvin Jones – drums

=== Production personnel ===
- Nesuhi Ertegün — production
- Tom Dowd, Phil Iehle — engineering
- Lee Friedlander — photography
- Loring Eutemey — cover design
- Bill Coss — liner notes
- Bob Carlton, Patrick Milligan — reissue supervision
- Bill Inglot, Dan Hersch — digital remastering
- Rachel Gutek — reissue design
- Hugh Brown — reissue art direction
- Nat Hentoff — reissue liner notes
- Steven Chean — reissue editorial supervision
- Ted Myers, Elizabeth Pavone — reissue editorial coordination

== Certifications ==
Region	Certification	Certified units/sales
United States (RIAA)	Gold	500,000^{‡}
^{‡} Sales+streaming figures based on certification alone.

== Sources ==
- Porter, Lewis (1999). John Coltrane: His Life and Music. University of Michigan Press. ISBN 978-0-472-08643-6.
