= Olé Coltrane =

Studio album by John Coltrane
- Released: November 1961
- Recorded: May 25, 1961
- Studio: A & R (New York City)
- Genre: Modal jazz
- Length: 36:50 original LP; 45:50 CD reissue
- Label: Atlantic; SD 1373
- Producer: Nesuhi Ertegun

John Coltrane chronology
Africa/Brass (1961)	Olé Coltrane (1961)	Settin' the Pace (1961)

Olé Coltrane is a studio album by the jazz musician and composer John Coltrane. It was released in November 1961 by Atlantic Records. The album was recorded at A&R Studios in New York, and was the last of Coltrane's Atlantic albums to be made under his own supervision.

== Background ==
Two days prior to the recording of Olé Coltrane, Coltrane had made Africa/Brass, his inaugural recording session for his new label, Impulse! Records, at the Van Gelder Studio in Englewood Cliffs, New Jersey. With one further album due his old label Atlantic, he brought in his working quintet along with two participants in the Africa/Brass sessions, Art Davis and Freddie Hubbard. Owing to his concurrent contract with Prestige Records, Eric Dolphy was listed on the credits under the pseudonym George Lane.

Coltrane's interest in the music of Spain evident in "Olé", may have been spurred by his ex-employer Miles Davis's Sketches of Spain from the previous year. The structure and melody of the modal jazz vamp "Olé" was borrowed from the Spanish folk song "El Vito" (later used as the tune of "El Quinto Regimiento" from the Spanish Civil War, which was made known by Pete Seeger), while the soprano saxophone work recalled 1961's "My Favorite Things".

The titles for the songs on side two reflect the band's continued interest in African forms as expressed on the May 23 Africa/Brass recordings. McCoy Tyner commented: "On 'Dahomey Dance' [Coltrane] had a record of these guys who were from Dahomey, which is why he used two bassists. He showed that rhythm to Art Davis and Reggie Workman. So the influence was there." Tyner's "Aisha," a ballad, was named after the pianist's then-wife.

On September 19, 2000, Rhino Records reissued Olé Coltrane as part of its Atlantic 50th Anniversary Jazz Gallery series. Included was a single bonus track which had appeared on The Heavyweight Champion: The Complete Atlantic Recordings in 1995.

== Reception ==
Professional ratings
Review scores
Source	Rating
AllMusic	4/5 stars
Down Beat	3.5/5 stars
The Penguin Guide to Jazz	3/4 stars
The Rolling Stone Jazz Record Guide	4/5 stars
All About Jazz	4.5/5 stars

In a review for AllMusic, Lindsay Planer wrote: "The complicated rhythm patterns and diverse sonic textures on Olé Coltrane are evidence that John Coltrane was once again charting his own course. His sheer ability as a maverick -- beyond his appreciable musical skills -- guides works such as this to new levels, ultimately advancing the entire art form."

The authors of The Penguin Guide to Jazz awarded the album 3 stars, noting that the presence of Hubbard "helped expand the timbral range, pointing to the new, more orchestrated sound Coltrane was interested in developing at the time," but cautioned: "interesting as it is episodically, Olé never quite holds the attention."

Writing for All About Jazz, John Ballon commented: "A transitional record, Olé Coltrane successfully navigates the line between Trane's sonically challenging later years and his earlier accessibility. A magnificent milestone in Trane's artistic growth, this is an essential recording for any collection."

In an article for Treble Zine, Jeff Terich stated: "You can point to any moment of Coltrane's playing on Olé and it would pretty much seal up why this hovers among the highest tier of the best John Coltrane albums. But it's how the entire ensemble works in harmony to create a stunning whole that this belongs not just in the ranks of the best John Coltrane albums, but jazz’s greatest albums as well."

Recording engineer Phil Ramone recalled that the recording session taught him a great deal about "how to condense a musical thought without diluting its coherence or artistic intention," and acknowledged that Coltrane's ability to self-edit affected the way he shaped other records with which he was involved.

== Influence ==
Olé has also been performed and recorded by Noah Howard on his live albums Live In Europe, Vol. 1 (1975) and Berlin Concert (1977) and by Coltrane's later sideman Pharoah Sanders, on his live album Heart Is a Melody from 1982.

In 1978, McCoy Tyner recorded a trio version of "Aisha" with bassist Ron Carter and drummer Tony Williams for the album Counterpoints.

In a 1998 interview for Fresh Air with Terry Gross, Ray Manzarek cited Coltrane’s Olé as an influence to his solo in The Doors’ song “Light My Fire.”

== Track listing ==
=== Side one ===
No.	Title	Writer(s)	Length
1.	"Olé"	John Coltrane	18:17

=== Side two ===
No.	Title	Writer(s)	Length
1.	"Dahomey Dance"	John Coltrane	10:53
2.	"Aisha"	McCoy Tyner	7:40

=== 1989 reissue bonus track ===
No.	Title	Writer(s)	Length
4.	"To Her Ladyship"	Billy Frazier	8:54

== Personnel ==
=== Musicians ===
- John Coltrane — soprano saxophone on "Olé" and "To Her Ladyship"; tenor saxophone on "Dahomey Dance" "Aisha" and second part of "To Her Ladyship"
- Freddie Hubbard — trumpet
- Eric Dolphy — as George Lane on flute on "Olé" and "To Her Ladyship"; alto saxophone on "Dahomey Dance" and "Aisha"
- McCoy Tyner — piano
- Reggie Workman — bass on "Olé", "Dahomey Dance" and "Aisha"
- Art Davis — bass on "Olé", "Dahomey Dance" and "To Her Ladyship"
- Elvin Jones — drums

=== Technical personnel ===
Original

- Nesuhi Ertegun — producer
- Phil Ramone — recording engineer
- Jagel & Slutzky Graphics — cover design
- Ralph J. Gleason — liner notes

Reissue

- Dan Hersch — digital remastering
- Rachel Gutek — reissue design
- Neil Tesser — reissue liner notes
