= Coltrane's Sound =

Studio album by John Coltrane
- Released: Late June/early July 1964
- Recorded: October 24 & 26, 1960
- Studio: Atlantic (New York City)
- Genre: Jazz
- Length: 38:18 original LP; 50:33 CD reissue
- Label: Atlantic; SD 1419
- Producer: Nesuhi Ertegun

John Coltrane chronology
Live at Birdland (1964)	Coltrane's Sound (1964)	Crescent (1964)

Coltrane's Sound is an album of music by the jazz musician and composer John Coltrane. It was released in 1964 through Atlantic Records. It was recorded at Atlantic Studios in 1960 during the sessions for My Favorite Things, and was assembled after Coltrane had stopped recording for the label and had a contract with Impulse! Records. Like Prestige and Blue Note Records before them, as Coltrane's fame grew during the 1960s Atlantic used unissued recordings and released them without either Coltrane's input or approval.

On February 16, 1999, Rhino Records reissued Coltrane's Sound as part of its Atlantic 50th Anniversary Jazz Gallery series. Included were two bonus tracks: "26-2" had been previously released on the 1970 album The Coltrane Legacy; and the alternate take of "Body and Soul" had been released on the 1975 album Alternate Takes.

== Reception ==
Professional ratings
Review scores
Source	Rating
All About Jazz	(favorable)
AllMusic	4/5 stars
The Encyclopedia of Popular Music	4/5 stars
The Penguin Guide to Jazz	4/4 stars
The Rolling Stone Jazz Record Guide	5/5 stars

In a review for AllMusic, Lindsay Planer called the album "one of the most highly underrated entries in Coltrane's voluminous catalog," and wrote: "The title could not have been more accurate, as each of the six pieces bear the unmistakable and indelible stamp of Coltrane's early-'60s style... Regardless of the lack of attention, these recordings remain among Trane's finest."

Douglas Payne of All About Jazz stated: "Spin Coltrane's Sound and even non-jazz fans sense something. It's a warm, human sound that takes listeners somewhere they like to go... [it] makes for essential, enjoyable jazz listening."

Writing for Jazz Views, Nick Lea described the album as a useful document "in tracing the saxophonist's transition from his coming out as a leader, and out from the shadow of his former boss to the ever searching and deeply exploratory playing that would ultimately lead to the classic A Love Supreme and the large scale Ascension."

Author Eric Nisenson singled out Coltrane's rendition of "Body and Soul" for praise, commenting: "Coltrane does what every great jazz musician can do with a tune no matter how familiar or shopworn: he makes it into a uniquely personal statement and lets us hear it anew, as if for the first time."

== Track listing ==
=== Side one ===
No.	Title	Writer(s)	Recording date	Length
1.	"The Night Has a Thousand Eyes"	Buddy Bernier, Jerry Brainin	October 26, 1960	6:51
2.	"Central Park West"	John Coltrane	October 24, 1960	4:16
3.	"Liberia"	John Coltrane	October 26, 1960	6:53

=== Side two ===
No.	Title	Writer(s)	Recording date	Length
1.	"Body and Soul"	Edward Heyman, Robert Sour, Frank Eyton, Johnny Green	October 24, 1960	5:40
2.	"Equinox"	John Coltrane	October 26, 1960	8:39
3.	"Satellite"	John Coltrane	October 24, 1960	5:59

=== 1999 reissue bonus tracks ===
No.	Title	Writer(s)	Recording date	Length
7.	"26-2"	John Coltrane	October 26, 1960	6:17
8.	"Body and Soul" (alternate take)	Heyman, Sour, Eyton, Green	October 24, 1960	5:58

== Personnel ==
- John Coltrane — tenor saxophone on all except "Central Park West"; soprano saxophone on "Central Park West" and "26-2"
- McCoy Tyner — piano except "Satellite"
- Steve Davis — bass
- Elvin Jones — drums

=== Production personnel ===
- Nesuhi Ertegün — production
- Tom Dowd — engineering
- Marvin Israel — photography
- Ralph J. Gleason — liner notes
- Bob Carlton, Patrick Milligan — reissue supervision
- Dan Hersch — digital remastering
- Rachel Gutek — reissue design
- Hugh Brown — reissue art direction
- Kenny Berger — reissue liner notes
- Steven Chean — reissue editorial supervision
- Elizabeth Pavone — reissue editorial coordination
