= Giant Steps (composition) =

1960 jazz composition by John Coltrane

Composition by John Coltrane

from the album Giant Steps
- Released: 1960
- Recorded: May 1959
- Studio: Atlantic Studios, New York
- Genre: Jazz; hard bop
- Length: 4:43
- Label: Atlantic
- Composer: John Coltrane
- Producer: Nesuhi Ertegun

"Giant Steps" is a jazz composition by American saxophonist John Coltrane. It was first recorded in 1959 and released on the 1960 album Giant Steps. The composition features a cyclic chord pattern that has come to be known as Coltrane changes. The composition has become a jazz standard, covered by many artists. Due to its speed and rapid transition through the three keys of B major, G major and E♭ major, Vox described the piece as "the most feared song in jazz" and "one of the most challenging chord progressions to improvise over" in the jazz repertoire.

== Background ==
"Giant Steps" was composed and recorded during Coltrane's 1959 sessions for Atlantic Records, his first for the label. The original recording features Coltrane on tenor saxophone, Paul Chambers on double bass, Tommy Flanagan on piano, and Art Taylor on drums. As with other compositions, Coltrane brought "Giant Steps" to the studio without rehearsal. On the original recording, Flanagan played a choppy start-stop solo in which he appears to struggle to improvise over Coltrane changes without preparation. Flanagan revisited "Giant Steps" on several recordings, including an album named after the song, which he dedicated to Coltrane.

In some of the alternate takes, Cedar Walton is at the piano, declining to take a solo and playing at a slower tempo than the takes with Flanagan. Coltrane had shown Walton "Giant Steps" a few weeks beforehand, planning to record it with him and allowing Walton to rehearse it. After a rehearsal at Coltrane's apartment, and another at the studio, Walton was not invited to the recording session. Coltrane said this was because Walton was out of town on the final recording date, but Walton speculated that it was because he declined to solo.

Coltrane named "Giant Steps" after its bass line: "The bass line is kind of a loping one. It goes from minor thirds to fourths, kind of a lop-sided pattern in contrast to moving strictly in fourths or in half-steps." It took two recording sessions two months apart before Coltrane was willing to release his original rendition of "Giant Steps". An analysis of Coltrane's solo reveals that he worked out melodic patterns over the changes in advance, which he deployed during his recorded improvisation.

== Musical characteristics ==
"Giant Steps"
An excerpt of the composition, from the album Giant Steps (1960)

From beginning to end, "Giant Steps" follows alternating modulations of major third and minor sixth intervals (with diminished fourth and augmented fifth intervals between B and E♭). Its structure primarily contains ii-V-I harmonic progressions (often with chord substitutions) circulating in thirds. The chords and patterns in "Giant Steps" reflect those found in Coltrane's compositions "Central Park West" and "Countdown", as well as his version of the Gershwins' song "But Not For Me".

In a 2018 interview, Quincy Jones said that the work was based on an example in Nicolas Slonimsky's Thesaurus of Scales and Melodic Patterns. Jones stated, "Everyone thinks Coltrane wrote that, he didn't. It's Slonimsky. That book started all the jazz guys improvising in 12-tone. Coltrane carried that book around till the pages fell off".

"Giant Steps" is usually played in a 'fast swing' style.

== Reception ==
"Giant Steps" has been praised by critics and has become a jazz standard along with "Naima" from the same album. According to Lindsay Planer, "Giant Steps" was a "crucial touchstone in the progression of Coltrane's music". She also highlighted the "tasteful synchronicity and thoroughly flexible pacing" of Paul Chambers and Art Taylor in the original recording, along with the "frenetic leads" by Tommy Flanagan and Coltrane.

In June 2026, CBS News included the song in its list of the 250 essential American songs of the past 250 years.

== Recordings ==
There are four released versions of "Giant Steps" from Coltrane's original 1959 sessions. All are collected on the Atlantic Masters CD Edition of Giant Steps released in 1998. Two versions, catalogued as alternative versions 1 and 2, feature Cedar Walton on piano and Lex Humphries on drums and were recorded on March 26, 1959. On May 5, 1959, two additional versions were recorded with Tommy Flanagan on piano and Art Taylor on drums. The take numbers are unknown for May 5, but one of the two versions became the master track for the original album. All recordings were made at Atlantic Studios, New York. The master studio recording was released on the 1960 album Giant Steps, which was inducted into the Grammy Hall of Fame in 2001. Additionally, on November 6, 2026, two live recordings of Coltrane performing "Giant Steps" were featured on Impulse's release of The Tiberi Tapes, a compilation of rare live recordings by Frank Tiberi, who followed Coltrane through Philadelphia and New York in the early 1960s. These recordings went largely unheard for over sixty years, many fans of Coltrane never hearing a live version played by him. These two recordings, one from a performance in June or July of 1960, the other feom July 22, 1960, are noticeably very low-fidelity, as they were recorded on a Magnavox TR-100, a very primitive portable reel-to-reel recorder. Both recordings feature McCoy Tyner on piano, Steve Davis on bass, and Pete La Roca on drums.

"Giant Steps" has been covered by numerous artists, including Archie Shepp and Max Roach on The Long March (1979) and Henry Butler on his debut album Fivin' Around (1986), among others. According to AllMusic, Buddy Rich and McCoy Tyner are the artists who have made the highest number of recordings of this composition. A cover version by Joey Alexander was nominated for Best Improvised Jazz Solo at the 58th Annual Grammy Awards.

The tune is popular among Latin jazz musicians, having been covered by Jorge Dalto, Gonzalo Rubalcaba, Justo Almario and Alex Acuña, and Paquito D'Rivera, among others. D'Rivera's version was released on Funk Tango, which won the Grammy Award for Best Latin Jazz Album in 2008.
