= Giant Steps =

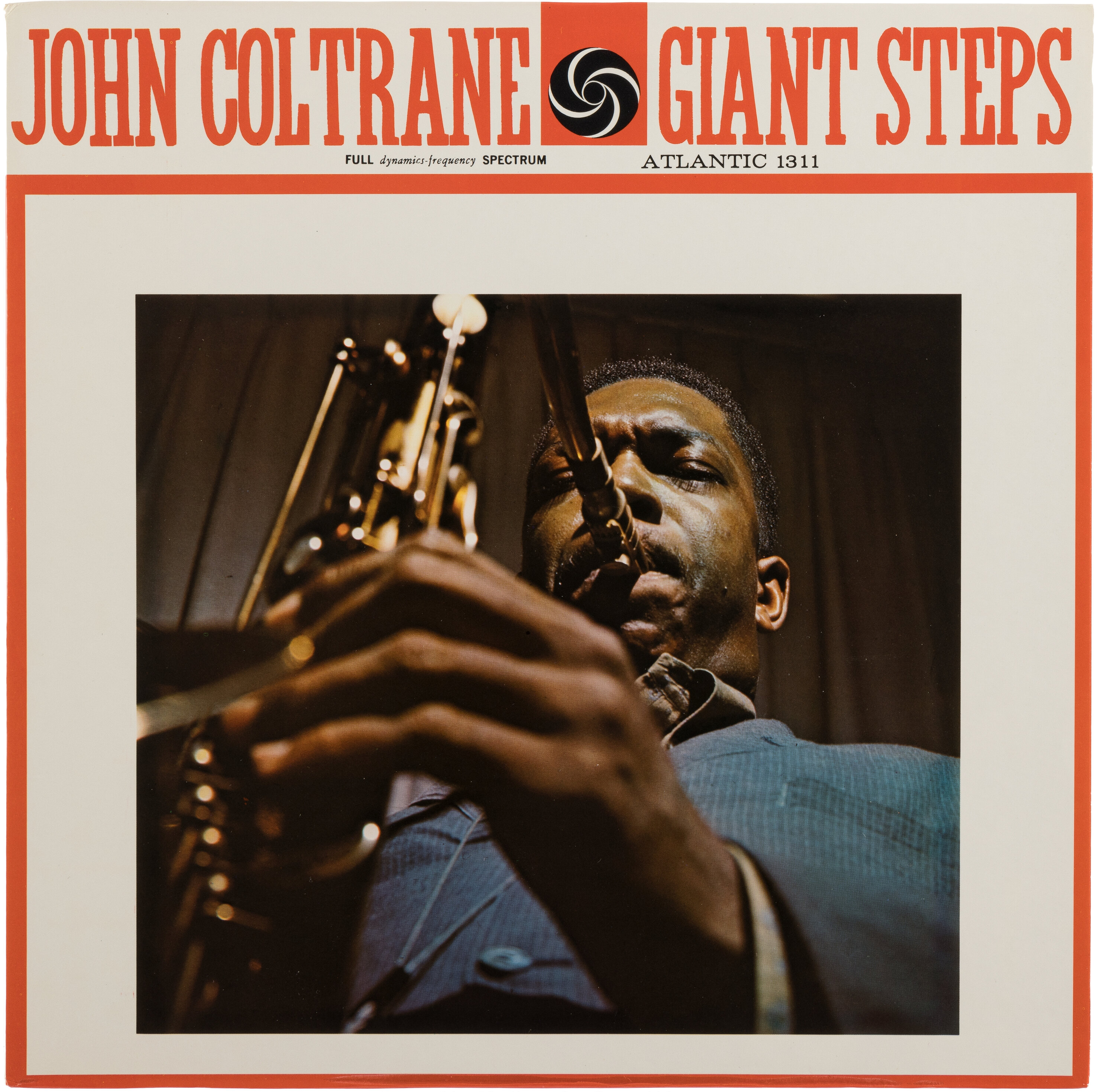

Studio album by John Coltrane
- Released: February 1960
- Recorded: May 4–5, 1959; December 2, 1959
- Studios: Atlantic, New York City
- Genres: Jazz; post-bop; hard bop
- Length: 37:03
- Label: Atlantic
- Producer: Nesuhi Ertegun

John Coltrane chronology
Soultrane (1958)	Giant Steps (1960)	Coltrane Jazz (1961)

Giant Steps is a studio album by the jazz saxophonist John Coltrane. It was released in February 1960 through Atlantic Records. It was Coltrane's first album as leader for the label, with which he had signed a new contract the previous year. The record is regarded as one of the most influential jazz albums of all time, and many of its tracks have become practice templates for jazz saxophonists. In 2004, it was one of fifty recordings chosen that year by the Library of Congress to be added to the National Recording Registry. It attained gold record status in 2018, having sold 500,000 copies.

Two tracks, "Naima" and "Syeeda's Song Flute", are respectively named after Coltrane's wife at the time and her daughter, whom he adopted. A third, "Mr. P.C.", takes its name from the initials of bassist Paul Chambers, who played on the album. A fourth, "Cousin Mary", is named in honor of Mary Lyerly, Coltrane's younger cousin.

== Background ==
In 1959, Miles Davis's business manager Harold Lovett negotiated a recording contract for Coltrane with Atlantic, the terms of which included a $7,000 annual guarantee (equivalent to $77,312 in 2025). Initial sessions for this album, the second recording date for Coltrane under his new contract after a January 15 date led by Milt Jackson, took place on March 26, 1959. Coltrane was dissatisfied with the results of this session with Cedar Walton and Lex Humphries, and hence they were not used for the album, but appeared on subsequent compilations and reissues. Principal recording for the album took place on May 4 and 5, two weeks after Coltrane had participated in the final session for Davis's Kind of Blue. The track "Naima" was recorded on December 2 with Coltrane's bandmates, the rhythm section from the Miles Davis Quintet, who would provide the backing for most of his next album, Coltrane Jazz.

Coltrane's improvisation exemplifies the melodic phrasing that came to be known as sheets of sound, and features his explorations into third-related chord movements that came to be known as Coltrane changes. The Giant Steps chord progression consists of a distinctive set of chords that create key centers a major third apart. Jazz musicians have since used it as a practice piece, its difficult chord changes presenting a "kind of ultimate harmonic challenge", and serving as a gateway into modern jazz improvisation. Several pieces on this album went on to become jazz standards, most prominently "Naima" and "Giant Steps".

== Reception and legacy ==
Professional ratings
Review scores
Source	Rating
AllMusic	5/5 stars
DownBeat	5/5 stars
The Encyclopedia of Popular Music	5/5 stars
The Penguin Guide to Jazz	4/4 stars
The Rolling Stone Album Guide	4.5/5 stars
The Rolling Stone Jazz Record Guide	5/5 stars
The Virgin Encyclopedia of Popular Music	5/5 stars

The Penguin Guide to Jazz selected this album as part of its suggested "Core Collection", calling it "Trane's first genuinely iconic record." In 2003, the album was ranked number 102 on Rolling Stone magazine's list of "The 500 Greatest Albums of All Time", 103 in a 2012 revised list, and 232 in a 2020 revised list.

In 2000, it was voted number 764 in Colin Larkin's All Time Top 1000 Albums.

On March 3, 1998, Rhino Records reissued Giant Steps as part of its Atlantic 50th Anniversary Jazz Gallery series. Included were eight bonus tracks, five of which had appeared in 1975 on the Atlantic compilation Alternate Takes, the remaining three earlier issued on The Heavyweight Champion: The Complete Atlantic Recordings in 1995.

In 2021, Stuart Nicholson of Jazzwise wrote, "So much has been written about Coltrane that it might appear you need a doctorate of music to go anywhere near his recordings. Nothing could be further from the truth, as Giant Steps demonstrates so eloquently. His music contains universal values that still speak to us now – the essential humanity of his work, the sheer joy of music making and the power and energy of his playing that even today can be both moving and uplifting. These are values that can be enjoyed by anyone and everyone, just as Coltrane intended."

== Track listing ==
Side one
No.	Title	Date recorded	Length
1.	"Giant Steps"	May 5, 1959	4:43
2.	"Cousin Mary"	May 5, 1959	5:45
3.	"Countdown"	May 4, 1959	2:21
4.	"Spiral"	May 4, 1959	5:56

Side two
No.	Title	Date recorded	Length
1.	"Syeeda's Song Flute"	May 5, 1959	7:00
2.	"Naima"	December 2, 1959	4:21
3.	"Mr. P.C."	May 5, 1959	6:57

1987 CD reissue bonus tracks
No.	Title	Date recorded	Length
8.	"Giant Steps" (alternate version 1)	March 26, 1959	3:41
9.	"Naima" (alternate version 1)	March 26, 1959	4:27
10.	"Cousin Mary" (alternate take)	May 5, 1959	5:54
11.	"Countdown" (alternate take)	May 4, 1959	4:33
12.	"Syeeda's Song Flute" (alternate take)	May 5, 1959	7:02

1998 CD reissue additional bonus tracks
No.	Title	Date recorded	Length
13.	"Giant Steps" (alternate version 2)	March 26, 1959	3:32
14.	"Naima" (alternate version 2)	March 26, 1959	3:37
15.	"Giant Steps" (alternate take)	May 5, 1959	5:00

== Personnel ==
In 1961, Coltrane received an Edison Award for Giant Steps at the Concertgebouw, Amsterdam.

Thursday, March 26, 1959 (Tracks 8, 9, 13, 14)

- John Coltrane – tenor saxophone
- Cedar Walton – piano
- Paul Chambers – bass
- Lex Humphries – drums

Monday, May 4, 1959 (Tracks 3, 4, 11) & Tuesday, May 5, 1959 (Tracks 1, 2, 5, 7, 10, 12, 15)

- John Coltrane – tenor saxophone
- Tommy Flanagan – piano
- Paul Chambers – bass
- Art Taylor – drums

Wednesday, December 2, 1959 (Track 6)

- John Coltrane – tenor saxophone
- Wynton Kelly – piano
- Paul Chambers – bass
- Jimmy Cobb – drums

=== Production ===
- Nesuhi Ertegun – producer
- Tom Dowd, Phil Iehle – engineer
- Lee Friedlander – photography
- Marvin Israel – cover design
- Nat Hentoff – liner notes
- Bob Carlton, Patrick Milligan – reissue supervision
- Bill Inglot, Dan Hersch – digital remastering
- Rachel Gutek – reissue design
- Hugh Brown – reissue art direction
- Vanessa Atkins, Steven Chean, Julee Stover – reissue editorial supervision
- Ted Meyers, Elizabeth Pavone – reissue editorial coordination

=== Release history ===
- 1960 – Atlantic Records SD 1311, vinyl record
- 1987 – Atlantic Records, first generation compact disc
- 1994 – Mobile Fidelity Gold CD
- 1998 – Rhino Records R2 75203, Deluxe Edition compact disc and 180-gram vinyl record
- 2020 – Atlantic Records R2 625106/603497848393, 60 Years Deluxe Edition, 2 CDs (Remastered Album + Outtakes)
- 2024 – Analogue Productions Hybrid SACD (Remastered from original analogue tape by Ryan K. Smith)

== Charts ==
Chart performance for Giant Steps
Chart (2009–2020)	Peak position
Portuguese Albums (AFP)	31
UK Album Sales (OCC)	14
UK Jazz & Blues Albums (Official Charts)	3
US Indie Store Album Sales (Billboard)	15
US Top Album Sales (Billboard)	59
US Top Jazz Albums (Billboard)	4
US Top Traditional Jazz Albums (Billboard)	3
