= Bags & Trane =

Studio album by Milt Jackson and John Coltrane
- Released: Mid July 1961
- Recorded: January 15, 1959
- Studios: Atlantic Studios, New York City
- Genres: Jazz, hard bop
- Length: 36:51 original LP; 56:33 CD reissue
- Labels: Atlantic Records; SD 1368
- Producer: Nesuhi Ertegün

Milt Jackson chronology
Soul Meeting (1961)	Bags & Trane (1961)	The Modern Jazz Quartet & Orchestra (1961)

John Coltrane chronology
My Favorite Things (1961)	Bags & Trane (1961)	Africa/Brass (1961)

Professional ratings
Review scores
Source	Rating
AllMusic	5/5 stars
DownBeat	3.5/5 stars
The Penguin Guide to Jazz Recordings	3.5/4 stars

Bags & Trane is an album credited to jazz musicians Milt Jackson and John Coltrane, released in 1961 on Atlantic Records, catalogue SD 1368. Taking its title from Jackson and Coltrane's nicknames, it is the only collaborative record by the two, although only Jackson contributed original compositions. In actuality, the album belongs in Jackson's discography, as he was the session leader and still signed to Atlantic under the auspices of the Modern Jazz Quartet, and not in that of Coltrane, who had left the label for Impulse Records at the time of this album's first issue. However, like Prestige Records, as Coltrane's profile grew after he had stopped recording for the label, Atlantic released them with Coltrane's name more prominently displayed.

== Reception ==
The contemporaneous DownBeat reviewer blamed the rhythm section for Jackson and Coltrane not gelling, and concluded: "the general impression is one of a session that could have been better, though it is still above the just-good mark".

== Track listing ==
Side one

No.	Title	Writer(s)	Length
1.	"Bags & Trane"	Milt Jackson	7:25
2.	"Three Little Words"	Harry Ruby	7:29
3.	"The Night We Called It a Day"	Matt Dennis, Tom Adair	4:22

Side two

No.	Title	Writer(s)	Length
4.	"Be-Bop"	Dizzy Gillespie	8:00
5.	"The Late Late Blues"	Milt Jackson	9:35

1988 Atlantic Records CD (with bonus tracks)

1. "Stairway to the Stars" (Matty Malneck, Mitchell Parish, Frank Signorelli) - 3:32
2. "The Late Late Blues" - 9:35
3. "Bags & Trane" - 7:25
4. "Three Little Words" - 7:29
5. "The Night We Called It a Day" - 4:22
6. "Be-Bop" - 8:00
7. "Blues Legacy" (Jackson) - 9:04
8. "Centerpiece" (Sweets Edison, Bill Tennyson) - 7:06

2010 and 2012 European releases on Essential Jazz Classics and Efor

Since 2009, when the recordings passed into the public domain in Europe, European record labels have issued editions of the album including additional tracks from the recording sessions and additional tracks not related to the original album recording sessions. The Essential Jazz Classics and Efor labels both released the album appended with two 1957 Prestige Records trio recordings of Coltrane playing blues compositions. While these releases conform with European laws, they are unlicensed and made without access to the original master tapes of the sessions.

1. "Bags & Trane" - 7:26
2. "Three Little Words" - 7:30
3. "The Night We Called It a Day" - 4:22
4. "Be-Bop" - 8:00
5. "The Late Late Blues" - 9:35
6. "Stairway to the Stars" (Malneck, Parish, Signorelli) - 3:31
7. "Blues Legacy" - 9:04
8. "Centerpiece" (Edison, Tennyson) - 7:07
9. "Trane's Slow Blues" (bonus track) (John Coltrane) - 6:03
10. "Slowtrane" (bonus track) (John Coltrane) - 7:19

Different personnel on bonus tracks (9 & 10):

- John Coltrane — tenor sax
- Earl May — bass
- Art Taylor — drums

Recorded at Hackensack, New Jersey, on 16 August 1957.

== Personnel ==
- Milt Jackson — vibraphone
- John Coltrane — tenor saxophone
- Hank Jones — piano
- Paul Chambers — double bass
- Connie Kay — drums

=== Production personnel ===
- Nesuhi Ertegün — producer
- Tom Dowd — engineer
- Lee Friedlander — photography
- Bob Porter — compact disc reissue producer
