= The World According to John Coltrane =

- Directed by: Robert Palmer, Toby Byron
- Written by: Robert Palmer
- Produced by: Toby Byron, Richard Saylor
- Starring: Rashied Ali, Tommy Flanagan, Jimmy Heath, Wayne Shorter, La Monte Young, Alice Coltrane
- Narrated by: Ed Wheeler
- Distributed by: BMG Video
- Release date: 1990
- Running time: 59 minutes
- Language: English

The World According to John Coltrane is a 1990 documentary about jazz saxophonist John Coltrane.

== Overview ==
The World According to John Coltrane, directed by Robert Palmer moves chronologically. It shows interviews with musicians who worked with Coltrane, such as Rashied Ali, Jimmy Heath, Roscoe Mitchell, and Wayne Shorter, and film clips of live performances. One brief clip shows Coltrane playing "So What" with Miles Davis in 1959. Shown, too, is a performance by the classic quartet of Coltrane, Jimmy Garrison, Elvin Jones, and McCoy Tyner at a jazz festival, and the quartet playing with Eric Dolphy. Coltrane's live performance of "Alabama" is shown in full. The documentary omits commentary by scholars in favor of a narrated chronology of his life, interviews with his contemporaries, and live film clips.

== Tracks ==
1. A Love Supreme
2. Alabama
3. Blue Monk
4. Dahomey Dance
5. Dear Lord
6. Eight Miles High
7. Giant Steps
8. Gospel Song 1
9. Gospel Song 2
10. Hot House
11. Impressions
12. Impressions 2
13. India
14. Koko
15. Moroccan Folk Song
16. My Favorite Things
17. My Favorite Things 2
18. Naima
19. Number One
20. Raga Bhimpalisi
21. Roscoe In Morocco
22. Round Midnight
23. So What
24. Things To Come
