= Naima =

Composition by John Coltrane

from the album Giant Steps
- Released: 1960
- Recorded: May 1959
- Genre: Jazz
- Length: 4:21
- Label: Atlantic
- Composer(s): John Coltrane
- Producer(s): Nesuhi Ertegün

"Naima" (/naɪˈiːmə/ ny-EE-mə) is a jazz ballad composed by John Coltrane in 1959 that he named after his then-wife, Juanita Naima Grubbs. Coltrane first recorded it for his 1959 album Giant Steps, and it became one of his first well-known works.

== History ==
Coltrane recorded "Naima" many times. It appears on The Complete Copenhagen Concert (1961), Live at the Village Vanguard Again! (1966), Afro Blue Impressions (1977), The Complete 1961 Village Vanguard Recordings (1997), and Blue World (2019). "Naima" has since become a jazz standard.

== Structure ==
According to Coltrane, "The tune is built ... on suspended chords over an E♭ pedal tone on the outside. On the inside – the channel – the chords are suspended over a B♭ pedal tone." The composition, on that recording, is a slow, restrained melody, with a brief piano solo by Wynton Kelly.

=== Chord changes ===
Chord changes for "Naima":

‖: B♭–7/E♭    ‖ E♭–7     ‖ Amaj7+5/E♭  Gmaj7+5/E♭ ‖ A♭maj7/E♭ :‖ 
‖  Bmaj7/B♭   ‖ B♭7♭9    ‖ Bmaj7/B♭               ‖ B♭7♭9      ‖
‖  B-maj7/B♭  ‖ Bmaj7/B♭ ‖ A♭maj7/B♭              ‖ Emaj7♯11   ‖ 
‖  B♭–7/E♭    ‖ E♭–7     ‖ Amaj7+5/E♭  Gmaj7+5/E♭ ‖ A♭maj7/E♭  ‖

Scale associations:

‖: E♭ Mixolydian          | E♭ Dorian           | F♯ Mel. Minor, E Mel. Minor | A♭ Lydian     :‖ 
‖  B♭ Phrygian            | B♭ Dim. Scale (H-W) | B♭ Phrygian                 | B♭ Dim. Scale  |
‖  B♭ Alt. (B Mel. Minor) | B♭ Phrygian         | B♭ Mixolydian               | E Lydian       ‖ 
‖  E♭ Mixolydian          | E♭ Dorian           | F♯ Mel. Minor, E Mel. Minor | A♭ Lydian      ‖

== Cultural references ==
- "Naima" is featured in a scene in the 2013 Polish movie Ida, in which the title character is intrigued by the jazz and its player.
- Kamau Brathwaite's poem "Naima for John Coltrane" was included in the Poems on the Underground project.
