= Atlantic Studios =

American record studio

Coordinates: 40.76918°N 73.98258°W

Atlantic Studios is the recording studio network of Atlantic Records. Although the historic recording studio was located at 1841 Broadway (at the corner of 60th Street), in New York City, Atlantic Recording Studios was initially located at 234 West 56th Street from November 1947 until mid-1956. When the Shorty Rogers and His Giants album Martians Come Back! was issued in August 1956, the address of Atlantic Recording Studios had relocated to 157 West 57th Street. The studio was the first to record in stereo due to the efforts of Tom Dowd. The new Atlantic Studios includes a network of label-operated studios spanning New York, Atlanta, and California.

== The Studios ==
In the early days of Atlantic Records, producer Tom Dowd would do recording at the offices. At night the desks would be pushed against the walls and singing groups would gather around one or two microphones in the inner office and he would be in the outer office recording singing groups with a small mixer and a tape recorder.

In 1958, Dowd convinced Ampex (and Jerry Wexler) to sell the second Ampex 8-track tape recorder ever manufactured to Atlantic Studios, putting Atlantic ahead of other studios for many years.

In 1959, Atlantic Records and Atlantic Studios moved to 1841 Broadway. The studios were in the co-joined building at 11 West 60th Street. When Atlantic Records moved to 75 Rockefeller Center in the mid-1970s, Atlantic Studios expanded to occupy the entire second floor of both buildings. In the early 1980s, the studios expanded to the third floor.

The studio complex eventually consisted of two studios, a mix room, two disk mastering rooms, two editing and tape copy rooms, two digital transfer rooms, a quality control room for Atlantic Records-manufactured products (45s, LPs, Cassettes, 8-Tracks and CDs), tape library (tape vault offsite) and several offices and lounges.

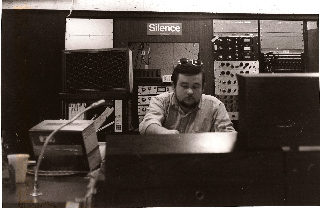
Gene Paul at Atlantic Records in the 1970s

Studio A – approximately 50' × 30' × 15', control room 20' × 15', and a later a Hidley redesign 24' × 24'. The control room had two generations of MCI consoles (the "black" console and then a 528), later the Hidley control room had a custom Neve. Monitors were by Altec, UREI and Hidley. Tommy Dowd early on installed variable acoustic sound traps that affected both the low frequency absorption and the reverberation time in the studio.

Studio B – approximately 30' × 15' × 15', control room 15' × 15'. Consoles were MCI 528 and then Neve, and monitoring was by Altec and then UREI.

Mix Room – approximately 15' × 12', later a new repositioned mix room and vocal booth 20' × 18'. Consoles were a built-in-house 16-channel passive summing mixer, then original Studio A MCI "black" console, then a third MCI 528 purchased from Criteria Studios, with a Solid State Logic console in the new mix room. Monitoring was facilitated with Altec monitors.

Mastering Rooms – Neumann and Scully Disk Cutting systems, and Altec monitoring.

Tape Recorders – Ampex, Scully, MCI, Studer, and Sony.

Microphones – Neumann, AKG, Sennheiser, Electro-Voice, Sony, Shure, and RCA.

Outboard Equipment – Dolby, Teletronix, Pultec, Lang, Spectra-Sonic, Eventide, Allison Research, Audio & Design, Ltd and Fairchild.

Reverberation – An echo chamber was built in the basement of 1841 Broadway, but it was rarely used in later years; reverberation was primarily provided by EMT analog and digital reverberation units.

The studios closed in 1990 and Atlantic Records' in-house digital and analog production rooms and the tape library were re-located to West 54th Street.

Atlantic Records relocated to 1633 Broadway New York, New York, in 2015, and opened a new in-house studio, Atlantic Studios NYC, which has hosted numerous artists and sessions, including the Grammy Award-winning Hamilton and Dear Evan Hansen Original Broadway Cast Recordings, Sturgill Simpson, Kaleo, Ed Sheeran, Wiz Khalifa, Cardi B, Brent Cobb, Janelle Monáe, Jason Mraz, Lin-Manuel Miranda, Lauryn Hill, Christina Perri, Charlie Puth, Sara Bareilles, Anne Marie, Shooter Jennings, Rob Thomas, Kelly Clarkson, SWMRS, Christine & The Queens, Melanie Martinez, MisterWives, Wallows, Royal Blood, Santigold, Halestorm, Anderson East, Jon Batiste, ARIZONA, The Roots, Roberta Flack, and many more.

Atlantic Records studio network also includes Atlantic Studios West in Hollywood, California; Atlantic Studios NOHO in North Hollywood; Atlantic Studios ATL in Atlanta, Georgia; and a studio in Burbank, California.

== Founders of Atlantic Records ==
- Ahmet Ertegün
- Nesuhi Ertegün
- Herb Abramson (co-developer of the studios.)

== Producers ==
- Arif Mardin
- Jerry Wexler
- İlhan Mimaroğlu
- Joel Dorn

== Producers – recording/mixing engineers ==
- Tom Dowd (co-developer of the studios)
- Jimmy Douglass
- Gene Paul (son of Les Paul)
- Lew Hahn
- Bobby Warner
- Adrian Barber
- Phil Iehle
- Bruce Tergesen

== Recording/mixing engineers ==
- Tom Heid
- Randy Mason
- Bruce Tergesen
- Michael O'Reilly
- Bill Dooley
- Dan Nash
- Stephen Benben
- Brian Eddolls – Synclavier Programmer

== Mastering engineers ==
- George Piros
- Dennis King
- Rob Grennell
- George Peckham

== Technical engineers ==
- Clair Krepps – Chief Engineer; established his own studio, Mayfair Recording Studios, in 1965.
- Joel Kerr
- Tom Cahill
- Sami Ucikan
- Ray DeLeon

== Management ==
- Paul Sloman
- Dave Teig
- Frank Tabino

== Selected discography ==
=== Tracks ===
Chronological list, with album, artist, and recording dates :

- "Splish Splash" – Bobby Darin (10 April 1958)
- "Mr. Soul" – Buffalo Springfield Again, Buffalo Springfield (9 January 1967)
- "Pretty Girl Why" – Last Time Around, Buffalo Springfield (26 February 1967)
- "Kind Woman" – Last Time Around, Buffalo Springfield (February–March 1968)
- "Bring It On Home" – Led Zeppelin II, Led Zeppelin (1969)
- "Don't Knock My Love" – Wilson Pickett (1970)
- "Neighbours" – Tattoo You, Rolling Stones (date unknown) also recorded at Pathé Marconi Studios, Paris

=== Albums ===
Chronological list with artist, and recording dates :

- Pithecanthropus Erectus – Charlie Mingus (30 January 1956)
- The Clown (February and March 1957)
- Blues & Roots – Charlie Mingus (4 February 1959)
- Giant Steps – John Coltrane (1 April, 4 May and 2 December 1959)
- Coltrane's Sound – John Coltrane (24 and 26 October 1960)
- Dream Weaver – Charles Lloyd (29 and 30 March, 18 September, 29 October 1966)
- Lady Soul – Aretha Franklin (1967)
- Life Between the Exit Signs – Keith Jarrett (4 May 1967)
- Disraeli Gears – Cream (11–15 May 1967)
- Wheels of Fire – Cream (between July 1967 and April 1968)
- Restoration Ruin – Keith Jarrett (12 May 1968)
- Motor-Cycle – Lotti Golden (March 1969)
- The Allman Brothers Band
- Loaded – The Velvet Underground (between April and August 1970)
- Standing Here Wondering Which Way to Go – Marion Williams (25 February 1971)
- Words – Donal Leace (13 April 1971)
- Donal Leace – Donal Leace (13 April 1971)
- El Juicio (The Judgement) – Keith Jarrett (8, 9, 15 and 16 July 1971)
- The Mourning of a Star – Keith Jarrett (8, 9 and 16 July 1971)
- Birth – Keith Jarrett (15 and 16 July 1971)
- The Divine Miss M – Bette Midler (15 and 16 July 1971)
- Shotgun Willie – Willie Nelson (date unknown) also recorded at Quadrafonic Studios, Nashville and Sam Phillips Studios, Memphis
- Changes One – Charlie Mingus (27, 28 and 30 December 1974)
- Main Course – Bee Gees (between January and February 1975) also recorded at Criteria Studios, Miami FL
- Live from the Atlantic Studios, Bonfire – AC/DC (7 December 1977)
- Fear of Music – Talking Heads (date unknown) also recorded at Hit Factory, RPM Sound, The Record Plant, New York
- Chaka – Chaka Khan (1978)
- Spy – Carly Simon (from December 1978 to April 1979)
- The Honeydrippers: Volume One – Robert Plant (March 1984)
- Love Is for Suckers – Twisted Sister (date unknown)
- Danzig – Danzig (1987–1988) also recorded at Chung King Metal Studios, New-York
- Winger – Winger (1988)

=== Artists ===
Alphabetical list of main artists :

- AC/DC
- The Allman Brothers
- Average White Band
- Ray Barretto
- The Bee Gees
- Laurie Beechman
- Laura Branigan
- Ruth Brown
- Dave Brigati
- Eddie Brigati
- Roy Buchanan
- Buffalo Springfield
- Solomon Burke
- Gary Burton
- Felix Cavaliere
- Ray Charles
- The Coasters
- Ornette Coleman
- John Coltrane
- The Cookies
- Gene Cornish
- Cream
- Danzig
- Bobby Darin
- Dino Danelli
- The Drifters
- Emerson, Lake and Palmer
- Bryan Ferry
- Roberta Flack
- Aretha Franklin
- Foreigner
- Fotomaker
- Genesis
- Jon Hall
- Hall and Oates
- Donny Hathaway
- I Love My Wife (Original Cast Album)
- The Isley Brothers (with Jimi Hendrix)
- The J. Geils Band
- Keith Jarrett
- Garland Jeffreys
- Chaka Khan
- Ben E. King
- Hubert Laws
- Led Zeppelin
- Charles Lloyd
- Melissa Manchester
- Manhattan Transfer
- Herbie Mann
- Les McCann
- Bette Midler
- Charlie Mingus
- Modern Jazz Quartet
- Thelonious Monk
- Willie Nelson
- Charlie Parker
- Robert Plant
- Mike Posner
- Andy Pratt
- Ratt
- The Rolling Stones
- Diana Ross
- Roxy Music
- Rush
- Sam and Dave
- Shinedown
- Carly Simon
- Slave
- Sister Sledge
- Bruce Springsteen
- Ringo Starr
- Talking Heads
- James Taylor
- Kate Taylor
- Television
- Twisted Sister
- The Velvet Underground
- Narada Michael Walden
- Winger
- The Young Rascals

== Mastering ==
- Led Zeppelin II – Led Zeppelin (1969)
- Hejira – Joni Mitchell (date unknown)
- Diana – Diana Ross (1980)
- Koo Koo – Debbie Harry (1981)
- Soup For One – soundtrack of the film "Soup For One" (date unknown)
- Inside Story – Grace Jones (by Barry Diament, date unknown)
