= Nesuhi Ertegun =

Turkish-American record producer (1917–89)

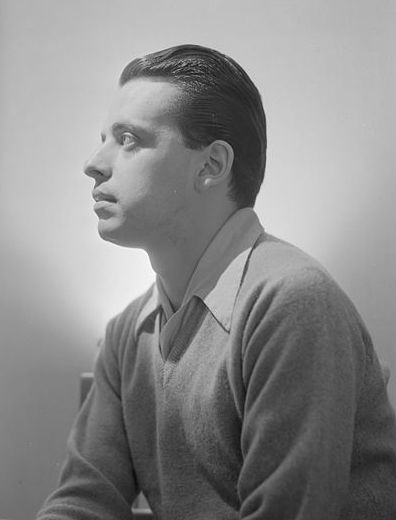
- Ertegun, c. 1930, by William P. Gottlieb
- Born: Nesuhi Ertegün; November 26, 1917; Istanbul, Ottoman Empire (now Turkey)
- Died: July 15, 1989 (aged 71); New York City, U.S.
- Father: Munir Ertegün
- Relatives: Ahmet Ertegun (brother)
- Awards: Rock and Roll Hall of Fame induction (1991); Grammy Trustees Award (1995)
- Musical career
- Occupations: Record producer; record executive
- Years active: 1941–1987
- Label: Atlantic Records

Nesuhi Ertegun (Turkish spelling: Nesuhi Ertegün; November 26, 1917 – July 15, 1989) was a Turkish-American record producer and executive of Atlantic Records and WEA International.

== Early life ==
Born in Istanbul in the Ottoman Empire, Nesuhi and his family, including his younger brother Ahmet, moved to Washington, D.C., in 1935 with their father Munir Ertegün, who was appointed the Turkish Ambassador to the United States that year.

From an early age, Nesuhi's primary musical interest was jazz. He had attended concerts in Europe before his family moved to the United States.

== Career ==
While living at the Turkish Embassy in Washington, D.C., from 1941 to 1944, he promoted jazz concerts. When his father died in 1944, and the rest of his family returned to Turkey, Nesuhi moved to California, where he married Jazz Man Record Shop owner Marili Morden and helped run the shop as well as establishing the Crescent Records label. After purchasing Jazz Man Records, he discontinued Crescent and issued traditional jazz recordings on Jazz Man until 1952. At Jazz Man, Nesuhi produced classic Kid Ory revival recordings in 1944–1945, plus other recordings by Pete Daily and Turk Murphy. (Note: For more on this seminal period in Ertegun's career, see Cary Ginell's Hot Jazz for Sale: Hollywood's Jazz Man Record Shop (Origin Jazz Library, 2010), which includes biographical details and images of Ertegun from his early life before he joined Atlantic Records in the mid-1950s.)

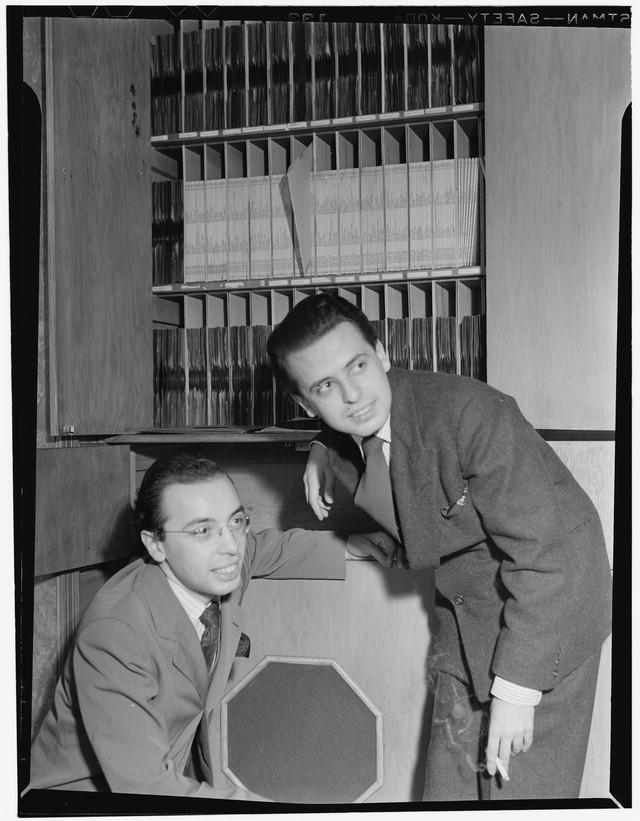
Nesuhi Ertegun (right) and his brother Ahmet in the record room at the Turkish Embassy in Washington, D.C., c. 1930s

Although his main interest was initially New Orleans jazz, which he also wrote about while serving as the editor of Record Changer magazine, Ertegun was open to more modern styles. In 1952, he sold the Jazz Man label to Lester Koenig and then went to work for Koenig at Good Time Jazz Records. While there, on Koenig's recommendation, he was engaged to teach a history of jazz course for academic credit at University of California, Los Angeles (UCLA), the first of its kind at a major U.S. university.

In 1955, he was preparing to work for Imperial Records to develop their jazz record line and a catalog of LPs. However, Ahmet Ertegun and Jerry Wexler persuaded him instead to join their company, Atlantic Records, where he was made a partner. He became vice-president in charge of the jazz and LP department at Atlantic, building up the label's extensive catalog of jazz LPs. He was responsible for investing in the album market, improving the quality of recordings and sleeve formats.

As a producer at Atlantic, he worked with John Coltrane, Charles Mingus, Ornette Coleman (whom Lester Koenig had previously recorded at Contemporary), and the Modern Jazz Quartet, among many others. Ertegun also became involved with the label's rhythm & blues and rock-and-roll roster, first recruiting songwriters and producers Leiber and Stoller, with whom he had worked in California, and producing several hit records for Ray Charles, Chris Connor, the Drifters, Bobby Darin, and Roberta Flack.

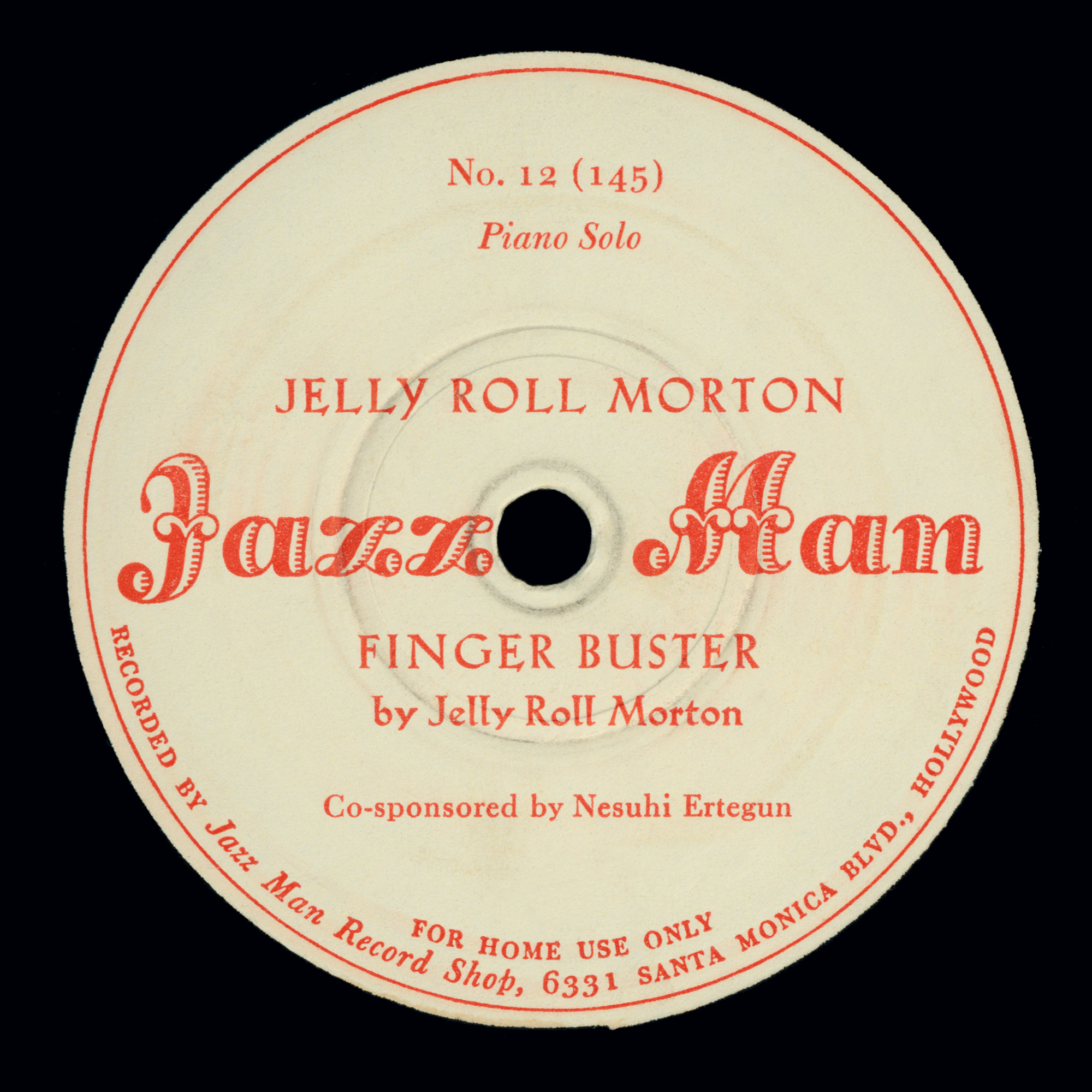
Ertegun's first credit on a record appeared in December 1942 on Jazz Man Records, a label he later purchased.

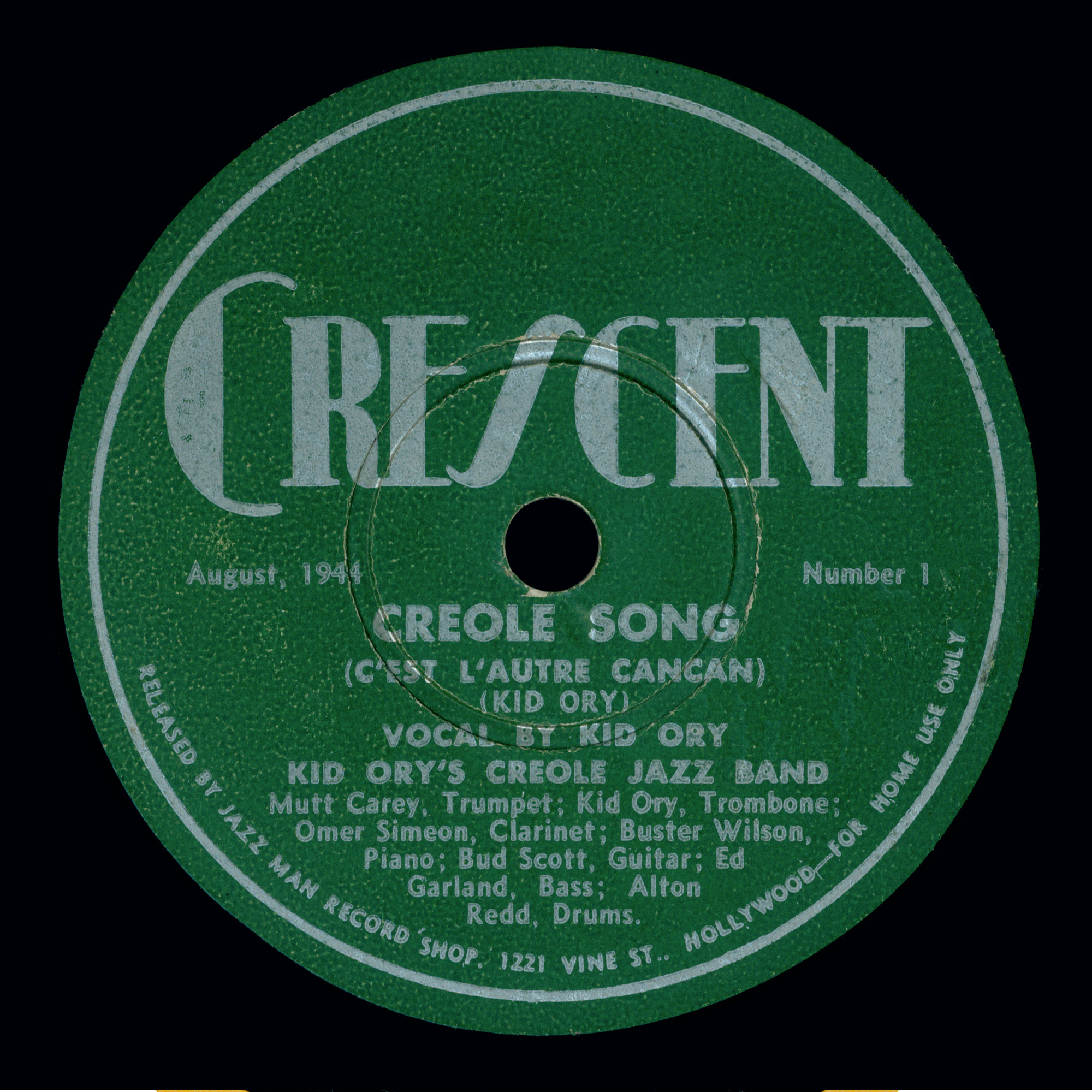
Ertegun founded his first label, Crescent Records, with the express purpose of recording Kid Ory's Creole Jazz Band (August 1944)

In 1971, Ertegun founded WEA International, now Warner Music Group. While at WEA International, he demonstrated tremendous independence and character, often going against the wishes of his U.S. counterparts. In the 1980s, he released the single "Girls, Girls, Girls" by then unknown Latin-American rock-and-roll band Renegade, demanding a domestic release of their debut album Rock N' Roll Crazy!. The domestic label had demanded the band members change their names to "less ethnic" sounding names. Ertegun was incensed by the demand and set out to introduce the record and the act internationally with the band's given names. He remained head of the Warner Records International Division until he retired in 1987.

== Death and legacy ==
With Ahmet, he also co-founded the New York Cosmos soccer team of the North American Soccer League. They were instrumental in bringing in soccer legends like Giorgio Chinaglia, Pelé, Carlos Alberto, and Franz Beckenbauer to the club.

Ertegun died on July 15, 1989, aged 71, from complications of cancer surgery at Mount Sinai Hospital in New York City.

Ertegun was inducted posthumously into the Rock and Roll Hall of Fame in 1991. He was posthumously awarded the Grammy Trustees Award for lifetime achievements in 1995. For his contributions to the sport of soccer, he and Ahmet were inducted into the National Soccer Hall of Fame in 2003. The Nesuhi Ertegun Jazz Hall of Fame (now the Ertegun Hall of Fame) at Jazz at Lincoln Center was dedicated to him in 2004.

Ertegun was an avid collector of surrealist art. His collection (along with that of his friend Daniel Filipacchi) was exhibited at the Guggenheim Museum in New York in 1999 in "Surrealism: Two Private Eyes, the Nesuhi Ertegun and Daniel Filipacchi Collections"—an event described by The New York Times as "a gourmet banquet" large enough to "pack the Solomon R. Guggenheim Museum from ceiling to lobby with a powerful exhibition".

== See also ==
- Turkish diaspora
