= Afro Blue (McCoy Tyner album) =

Compilation album by McCoy Tyner
- Released: November 13, 2007
- Recorded: 1998–2003
- Genre: Jazz, Latin jazz
- Length: 54:25
- Label: Telarc
- Producer: Elaine Martone

McCoy Tyner chronology
Quartet (2006)	Afro Blue (2007)

Professional ratings
Review scores
Source	Rating
All About Jazz	favorable
Allmusic	3.5/5 stars
JazzTimes	mixed
Record Collector	4/5 stars
The Penguin Guide to Jazz Recordings	3/4 stars

Afro Blue is a jazz album by musician McCoy Tyner, released on November 13, 2007. It compiles recordings from his albums on Telarc Records, documenting his eight-year tenure with the label.

== Track listing ==
1. "Afro Blue" (Mongo Santamaría) – 12:23
2. "If I Should Lose You" (Leo Robin, Ralph Rainger) – 6:24
3. "You Taught My Heart to Sing" (McCoy Tyner) – 5:39
4. "If I Were a Bell" (Frank Loesser) – 7:50
5. "Summertime" (George Gershwin) – 4:51
6. "The Night Has a Thousand Eyes" (Jerome Brainin) – 4:52
7. "Blue Bossa" (Kenny Dorham) – 6:51
8. "Carriba" (McCoy Tyner) – 5:38

1 & 7 from McCoy Tyner and the Latin All-Stars (1999)

6 & 8 from McCoy Tyner with Stanley Clarke and Al Foster (2000)

3 & 5 from Jazz Roots (2000)

4 from Land of Giants (2003)

2 from Illuminations (2004)

== Personnel ==
- McCoy Tyner – piano
- Johnny Almendra – timbales (1,7)
- Gary Bartz – saxophone (1, 2, 7)
- Ignacio Berroa – drums (1, 7)
- Giovanni Hidalgo – percussion (1, 7)
- Claudio Roditi – trumpet, flugelhorn (1, 7)
- Avery Sharpe – bass (1, 7)
- Steve Turre – trombone, shells (1, 7)
- Dave Valentin – flute (1, 7)
- Christian McBride – bass (2)
- Lewis Nash – drums (2)
- Bobby Hutcherson – vibes (4)
- Charnett Moffett – bass (4)
- Eric Harland – drums (4)
- Stanley Clarke – acoustic bass, electric bass (6, 8)
- Al Foster – drums (6, 8)
