= Franklin Kiermyer =

Canadian jazz drummer, composer, and bandleader

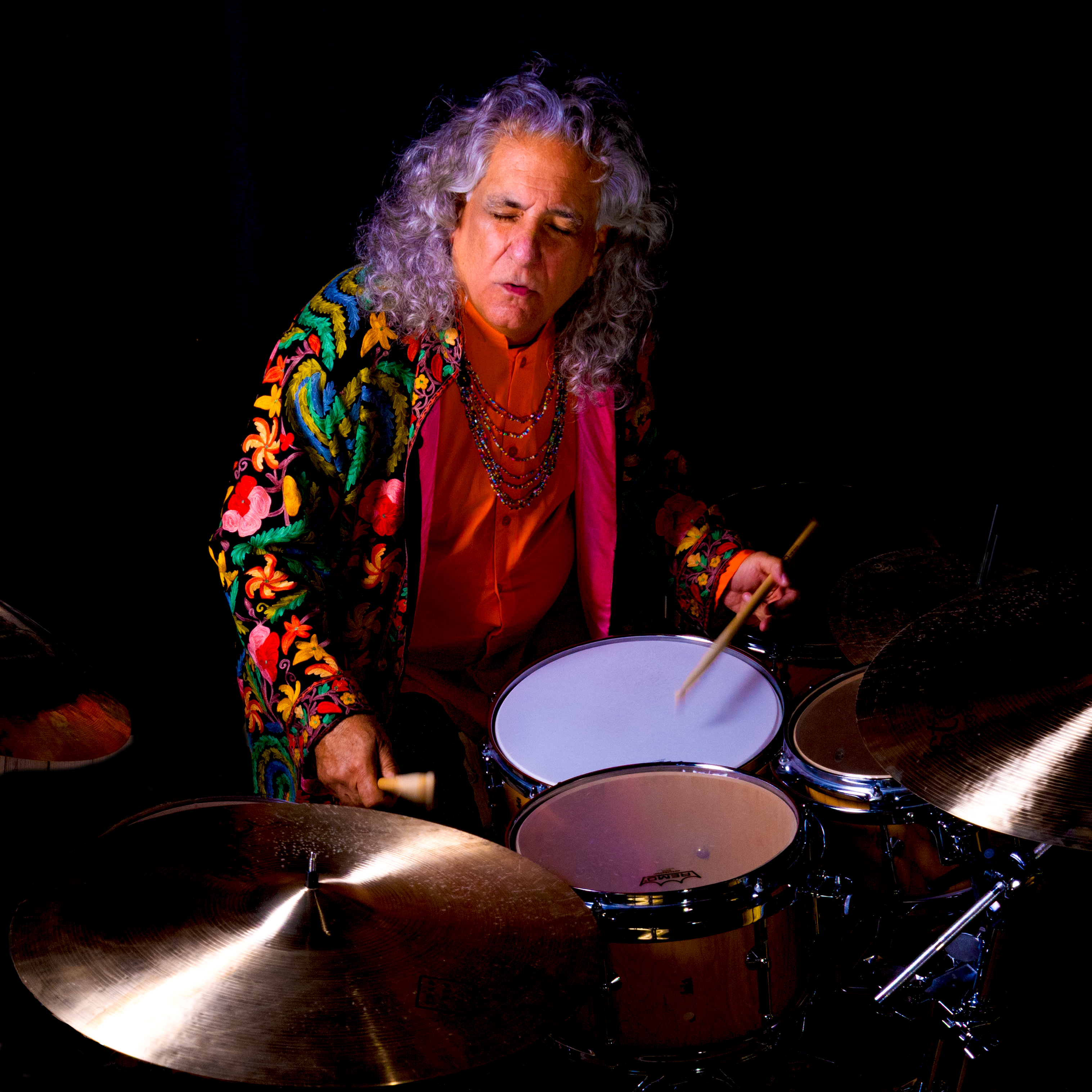

Background information
- Born: 21 July 1956 (age 70); Montreal, Quebec, Canada
- Genres: Jazz
- Occupation: Musician
- Instrument: Drums
- Website: kiermyer.com

Franklin Kiermyer (born 21 July 1956) is a jazz drummer, composer, and bandleader.

== Biography ==
Born and raised in Montreal, Quebec, Kiermyer first gained attention in 1994 with his album Solomon's Daughter, featuring tenor saxophonist and former John Coltrane bandmate Pharoah Sanders. Known mostly for his particularly expansive style of drumming and the passionate spiritual focus of his music.

Mostly self-taught, Kiermyer cites the early influence of drummers Baby Dodds, Sid Catlett, Minor Hall, and Gene Krupa. "All of these drummers had a big beat. It felt loose, spontaneous and sure at the same time and I really responded to that. I’ve always gone for that feeling of power and release in my own playing.” The music of Fats Waller, Kid Ory, Count Basie and Duke Ellington, as well as various orchestral music played in his parents' home magnetized his childhood. Growing up in the 60's and 70's he was also greatly affected by the psychedelic freedom music of Jimi Hendrix and other improvisers of the era and the social-political revolution they espoused.

In his early teens, his older brother gave him books about Tibetan Buddhism that led him to a life-long practice of meditation that would intensify over the years. Around the same time, a close friend introduced him to the mid-60's music of the John Coltrane Quartet with drummer Elvin Jones. This music had an immediate, profound and lasting impact and greatly helped shape his musical focus. “Records like Transition, Sun Ship and First Meditations became great inspirations for me. This felt like real spiritual music – a spiritual practice of using honesty and faith to transcend concepts and get to the heart of things. That openness, honesty and faith became my goal.” Kiermyer

Having reached a turning point in his evolution, Kiermyer spent much of 2001 to 2010 in remote Himalayan regions of Nepal and India on various solitary Buddhist meditation retreats, following the instructions of his teacher Khenpo Tsultrim Gyamtso Rinpoche. His musical output during this time was minimal. Kiermyer has stated that he felt this period was instrumental in reaching his spiritual and musical goals.

=== Franklin Kiermyer & Scatter The Atoms That Remain ===
Scatter The Atoms That Remain was the name of Kiermyer's band from 2017 to 2024. a colleague suggested he give the band its own name to differentiate the new music they were developing and that the name should somehow refer to Franklin's spiritual practice. "The first thing that came to mind was a spontaneous song my teacher had sung to me many years before when he was instructing me to practice Chöd.” Kiermyer

“Take this big corpse of the five skandhas and burn it in the realization of selflessness. Scatter the atoms that remain in the space of the Dharmadhatu and in the Dharmadhatu of no attachment ... Ah! Ah! Ha! Ha! Aaaah!” Khenchen Tsultrim Gyamtso Rinpoche

Since its inception, Scatter The Atoms That Remain has featured outstanding musicians rounding out the lineup. Usually performing and/or recording as a quartet or quintet, the band has included at various times: saxophonists George Garzone, Isaiah Collier, Billy Harper, Gary Bartz, Jovan Alexandre, Ben Solomon, Lawrence Clark, Emilio Modeste, Linda Sikhakhane, Abraham Burton, Boris Blanchet and Michael Troy - trumpeters Randy Brecker, Keyon Harrold, Josh Evans, Giveton Gelin and a cameo by Roy Hargrove a few weeks before his untimely passing. - Pianists Davis Whitfield, Aaron Parks, Leo Genovese, Wajdi Riahi - bassists Gene Perla, Géraud Portal, Otto Gardner, Nat Reeves, Yasushi Nakamura, Evan Flory-barnes and Eric Wheeler, guitarist Eric Schenkman, vocalist and flautist Melanie Charles, producer/songwriter and singer Jeff Bhasker and Bollywood singing star Jasbir Jassi have all either performed or have been guests on recordings with the band.

Kiermyer has also performed and recorded with many other notable musicians, including Umdze Lodro Samphel, Dewey Redman, Don Alias, Reggie Workman, John Abercrombie, Bobo Stenson, Tisziji Muñoz, Azar Lawrence, Joe Lovano, Chris Gekker, John Esposito, Dave Douglas, Juini Booth, Benito Gonzalez, Vernon Reid, Drew Gress, Fima Ephron, Dave Fiuzcynski, Famoro Dioubate, Umdze Lodro Samphel, Eric Person, Anthony Cox, Benny Barbara, Bob Mover, Michael Stuart, Hassan Hakmoun, John Stubblefield, John Rojak, Hill Greene, Dom Richards, Ivan Symonds, T.V. Gopalakrishnan, Debashish Battacharya, and Jatheeya Billy Robinson.

"Drummer Franklin Kiermyer offers a sense of shared catharsis through music that is at once majestic, ferocious, and relatable. When music writers are tasked with describing Kiermyer, the words “ecstasy” and “ecstatic” appear almost predictably, but sometimes a word is just right. Kiermyer's “Scatter The Atoms That Remain” quartet channels the kind of beautiful, disciplined intensity exemplified by late John Coltrane." Jazz At Lincoln Center

Scatter The Atoms' first release, Exultation, was co-produced by Kiermyer and legendary producer Michael Cuscuna, as was Kiermyer's albums Closer to the Sun and Further. Cuscuna has gone on record praising Kiermyer's music: "It's the urgency you feel when you listen ... Franklin got beyond his influences and comes through with him as an original player — his feel, his rhythmic patterns ... He has his own way of playing the drums, his own way of organizing music, his own way of unfolding a performance." Emancipation Suite, released in 2022 only on limited edition LP, was chosen as one of Down Beat Magazine's best albums of the year "Scatter the Atoms That Remain calls for universal freedoms such as it enacts." Howard Mandel

Kiermyer's new album, entitled "SCATTER THE ATOMS THAT REMAIN" is a 10-song, 54-minute album co-produced by him and Jason Olaine that features Davis Whitfield, Jeff Bhasker, Isaiah Collier, Jasbir Jassi, Keyon Harrold, Rakalam Bob Moses, Aaron Parks, Carlos Niño, Linda Sikhakhane, Nate Mercereau, Géraud Portal, Otto Gardner, Melanie Charles & Temitope Momorebe Gospel Singers. It will be released on September 18, 2026 on the Gearbox Records label worldwide.

== Discography ==
As leader

Year recorded	Title	Label	#	Info/Personnel
2026	Scatter The Atoms That Remain	Gearbox Records	GB4014	Franklin Kiermyer – Drums, Composer, Band Leader,, Isaiah Collier – saxophone, Davis Whitfield – piano, Otto Gardner – bass., Keyon Harrold – trumpet, Jasbir Jassi – vocals, Aaron Parks – piano, Linda Sikhakhane – saxophone, Carlos Niño – percussion, Jeff Bhasker – vocals, Melanie Charles – vocals, and the Temitope Momorebe Gospel Singers – vocals. produced by: Franklin Kiermyer & Jason Olaine
2020	Emancipation Suite	Mobility Music	MM 211015	Franklin Kiermyer – Drums, Composer, Band Leader, Emilio Modeste – tenor saxophone, Davis Whitfield – piano, Otto Gardner – bass, produced by: Franklin Kiermyer ... released 02/15/2022
2019	Exultation	Dot Time	DT 9085	Franklin Kiermyer – Drums, Composer, Band Leader, Jovan Alexandre – tenor saxophone, Davis Whitfield – piano, Otto Gardner – bass, produced by: Franklin Kiermyer & Michael Cuscuna
2019*	Solomon’s Daughter	Dot Time	DT 7103	re-issue of 1994 release with 3 previously unreleased songs Franklin Kiermyer – Drums, Composer, Band Leader, Pharoah Sanders – tenor saxophone, John Esposito – piano, Drew Gress – bass
2016	Closer to the Sun	Mobility Music	MM 11016	Franklin Kiermyer – Drums, Composer, Band Leader, Lawrence Clark – tenor saxophone Davis Whitfield – piano Otto Gardner – bass produced by Franklin Kiermyer & Michael Cuscuna
2014	Further	Mobility Music	MM 020131	Franklin Kiermyer – Drums, Composer, Band Leader, Azar Lawrence – tenor saxophone Benito Gonzalez – piano Juini Booth – bass produced by Franklin Kiermyer & Michael Cuscuna
2000	Great Drum of the Secret Mirror	SunShip	SSR 099003	The verses pertaining to the example of the Drum from the chapter called "The Seventh Vajra Point: Activity" of the Ratnagotravibhanga or Mahayanottaratantra-sastra ~ The Greater Vehicle Treatise on the Highest Continuum ~ One of the "Five Dharmas of Maitreya" given by Arya Maitreya to Arya Asanga rediscovered by the great Indian master Maitripa Following the instructions of the Tibetan yogi and scholar, Khenpo Tsultrim Gyamtso Rinpoche, set to music by Kiermyer and sung in Tibetan and English by many different singers.
2000	Sanctification	SunShip	SSR 099002	Franklin Kiermyer – Drums, Composer, Band Leader, Michael Stuart – tenor saxophone John Esposito – piano Fima Ephron – bass
1999	Auspicious Blazing Sun	SunShip	SSR 099001	Chant + ritual instruments: Franklin Kiermyer – Drums, Umdze Lodro Samphel. Dhondup Namgyal Khorko, Karma Dhodul, Chimey Dorje, Sherab Sangpo, Chojor Radha, Tom Schmidt
1996	Kairos	Evidence Music	ECD 22144-2	Franklin Kiermyer – Drums, Composer, Band Leader, Michael Stuart – tenor saxophone, Sam Rivers – soprano saxophone, Eric Person – alto saxophone, John Esposito – piano, Dom Richards – bass, Drew Gress – bass
1994	Solomon’s Daughter	Evidence Music	ECD 22083-2	Franklin Kiermyer – Drums, Composer, Band Leader, Pharoah Sanders – tenor saxophone, John Esposito – piano, Drew Gress – bass produced by: Franklin Kiermyer & engineered by Roy Cicala
1993	In the House of My Fathers	Konnex Records	KCD 5052	Franklin Kiermyer – Drums, Composer, Band Leader, Dave Douglas – trumpet, John Stubblefield – saxophone, John Esposito – piano, Anthony Cox – bass, Drew Gress – bass, Tom Chess – guitar, Eric St. Laurent – guitar, Chris Gekker – trumpet, Daniel Grabois – horn, John Rojak – bass trombone, David Braynard – tuba
1992	Break down the Walls	Konnex Records	KCD 5044	Franklin Kiermyer – Drums, Composer, Band Leader, Peter Madsen - piano, Tony Scherr - bass, Chris Gekker - trumpet, Russ Rizner - horn, John Rojak - trombone, Dave Braynard - tuba
