= Blue Note Jazz Club =

Jazz club and restaurant in New York City

Blue Note
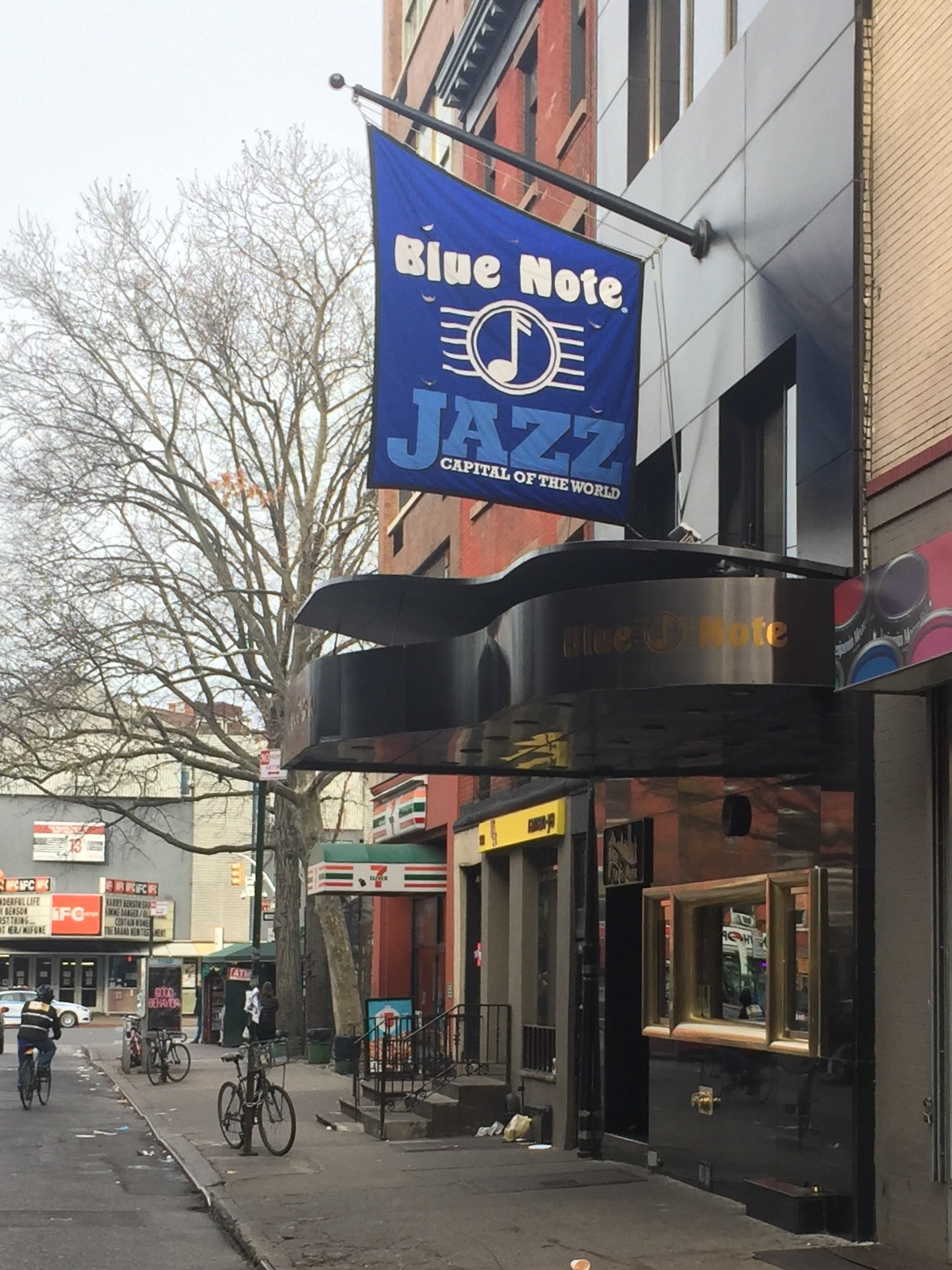
- Blue Note's original New York City location, 2016
- Interactive map of Blue Note
- Address: 131 West 3rd Street; United States
- Location: New York City
- Coordinates: 40°43′51″N 74°0′4″W
- Type: Jazz club

Construction
- Opened: September 30, 1981

Website
- www.bluenotejazz.com

Blue Note is an American chain of jazz clubs founded in New York City in 1981. Originally established in Greenwich Village, Blue Note has since expanded globally with multiple venues across North America, South America, Europe, and Asia. Regarded as one of the most prominent jazz music venue operators globally, they feature live performances, dining services, and curated programming that blends traditional jazz with contemporary genres.

== Name ==
The club is named after the eponymous blue note in the field of jazz and blues music. As a result, a number of other clubs exist of have existed around the world that are unrelated to the Blue Note franchise founded in New York City. Examples include the famed Blue Note club in Paris that operated during the 1950s and 1960s.

== History ==
The original Blue Note opened on September 30, 1981, in the Manhattan district of Greenwich Village by Danny Bensusan. The opening performance featured the Nat Adderley Quintet. Bensusan's belief was that "if he brought big acts into a comfortable environment with great food, he could pack the house night after night."

The club quickly became a leading venue in the New York jazz scene, hosting prominent musicians such as Dizzy Gillespie, Sarah Vaughan, Chick Corea, Keith Jarrett, Oscar Peterson, Lionel Hampton, James Carter, Ray Charles and The Modern Jazz Quartet.

Following its success in New York, Blue Note began expanding internationally with the opening of Blue Note Tokyo in Japan in 1988, which continues to operate. In 1990, Blue Note also opened venues in Osaka and Fukuoka. The chain expanded operations into Europe in 2003 with the opening of Blue Note Milano in Italy.

The franchise made a rapid expansion in 2016 and 2017. Domestically it opened its first venues outside its original New York City location, namely at California's Napa Valley Opera House as well as Blue Note Hawaii. Overseas, it opened its first venue in China and expanded into South America with a chain in Rio.

== Operations ==
Blue Note Jazz Club in Tokyo

Blue Note Entertainment Group operates all the jazz clubs in America and worldwide under the brand. While the flagship location remains at 131 West 3rd Street in New York City, New York, other domestic locations currently as of 2026 include Waikiki, Hawaii, and Los Angeles, California, while overseas operations are in Japan (Tokyo), China (Beijing and Shanghai), Brazil (Rio de Janeiro and São Paulo), Italy (Milan), and Britain (London).

=== Blue Note Jazz Festival ===
The Blue Note Jazz Festival began in New York City in 2011. Since then it has expanded to encompass the festival in other cities including at the Hollywood Bowl in Los Angeles and the "Black Radio Experience" in Napa California.

=== Blue Note Travel ===
Blue Note Travel is a travel and experiences division of Blue Note Entertainment Group, established in 2015 to provide music-focused cultural travel programs such as giving participants access to local music scenes.

=== Half Note Records ===
Half Note Records is the Blue Note's live record label, founded in 2001. Numerous musicians have recorded live albums at the Blue Note and released them on this label, including James Carter, Avishai Cohen, Elvin Jones, Odean Pope, Charles Tolliver, Jeff "Tain" Watts, Kenny Werner, Arturo Sandoval, Kenny Garrett and others. Since its founding in 1998, the label has also expanded its scope to include studio releases, including McCoy Tyner's 2008 album Guitars and Kenny Werner's 2010 release.

== Reputation and influence ==
Blue Note is considered one of the most influential jazz venue brands globally, known for its role in presenting major jazz artists and fostering new talent. Its expansion into multiple cities has contributed to the globalization of live jazz performance while maintaining a consistent club experience rooted in its New York origins.

== Gallery ==
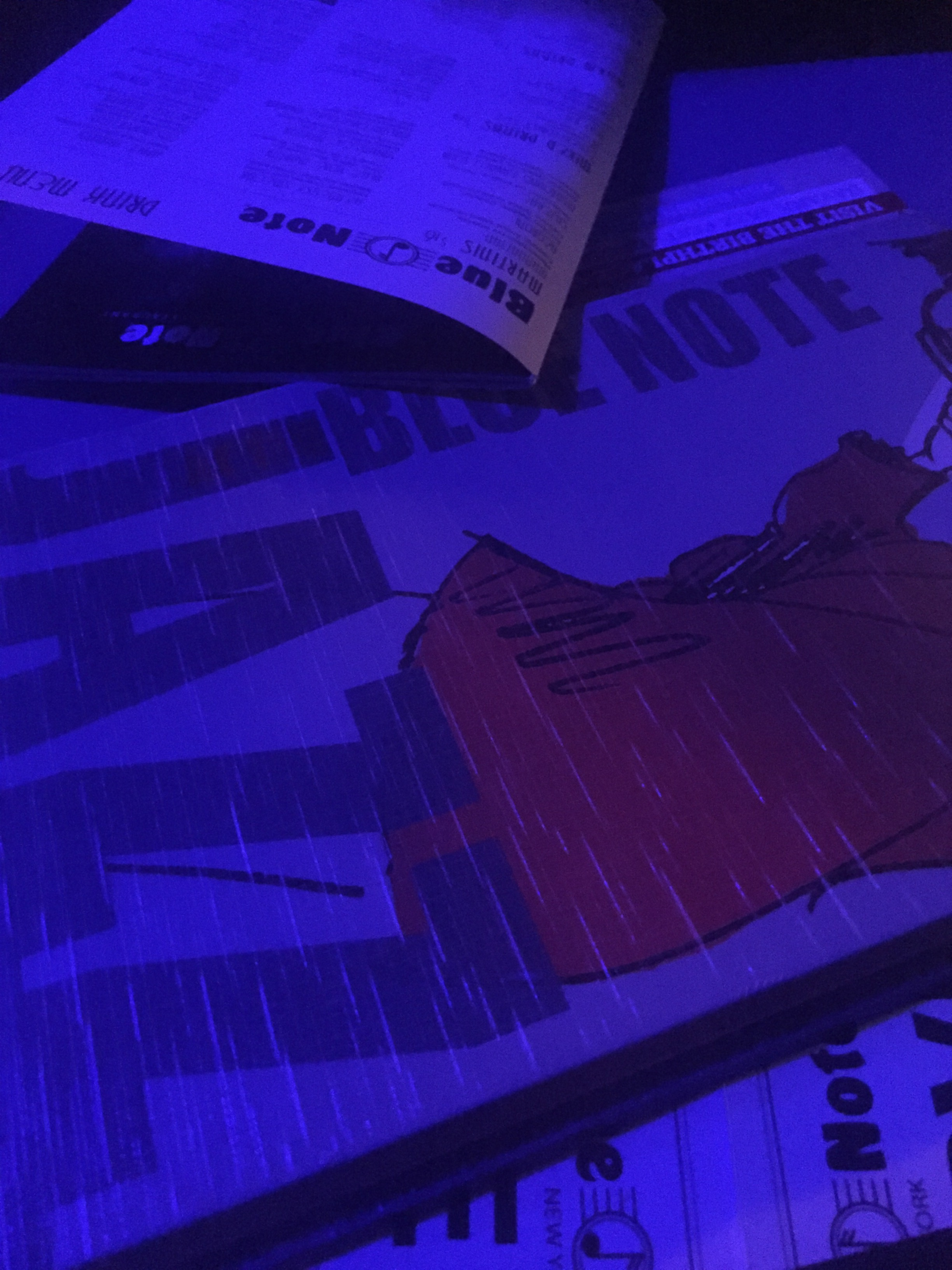
Program at the Blue Note Jazz Club, New York City, December 10, 2016

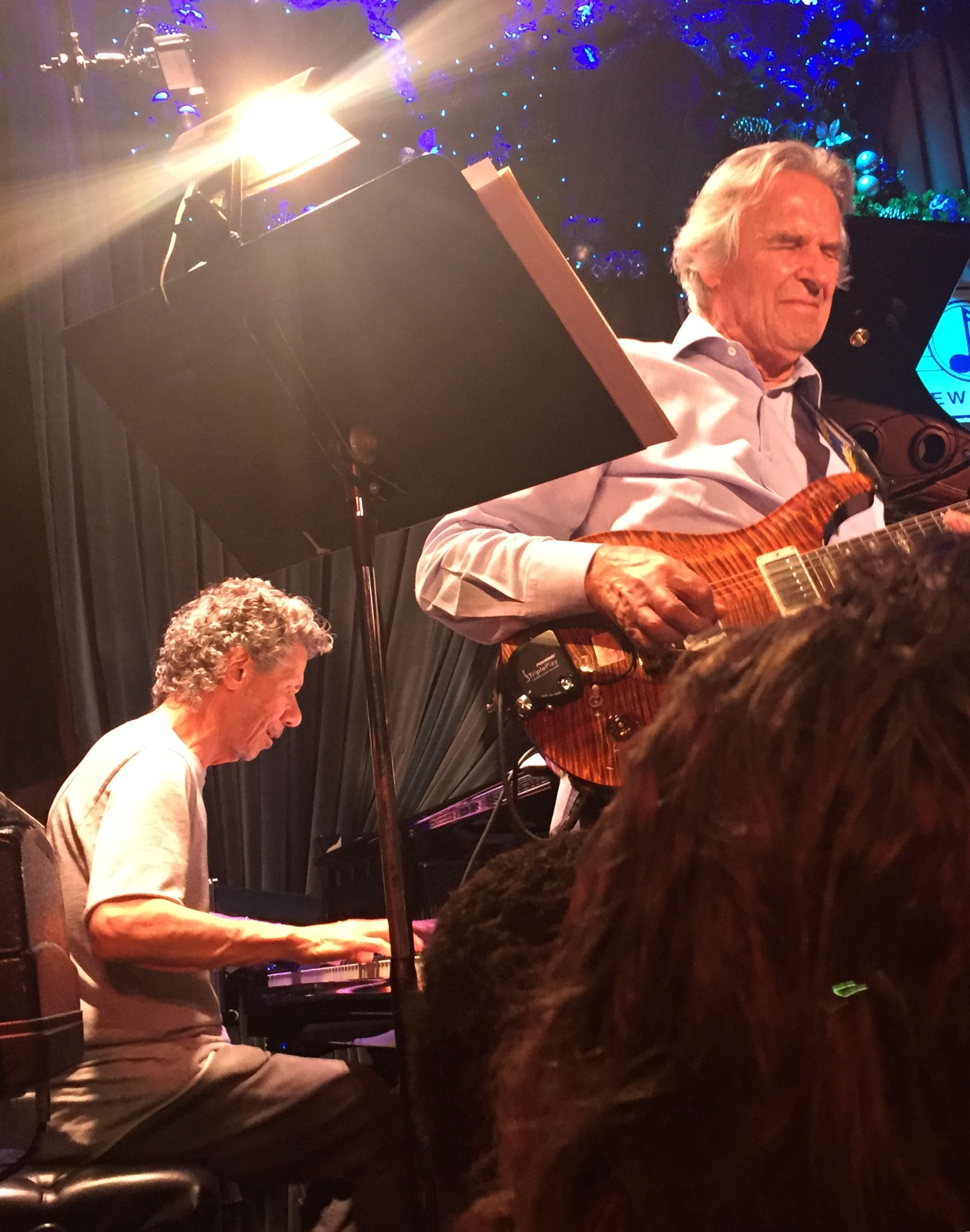
Chick Corea and John McLaughlin at the club on Corea's 75th birthday, December 10, 2016

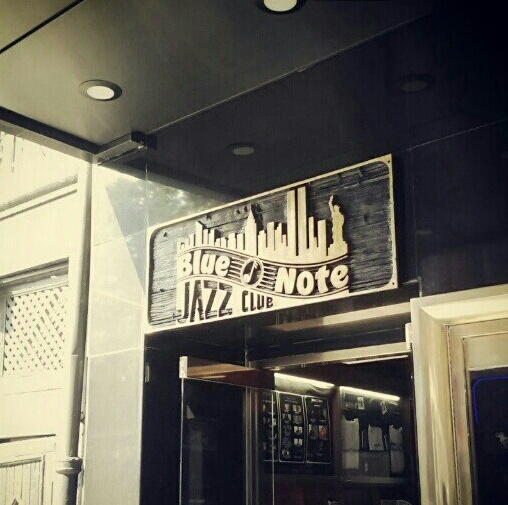
The Blue Note Jazz Club, August 2012

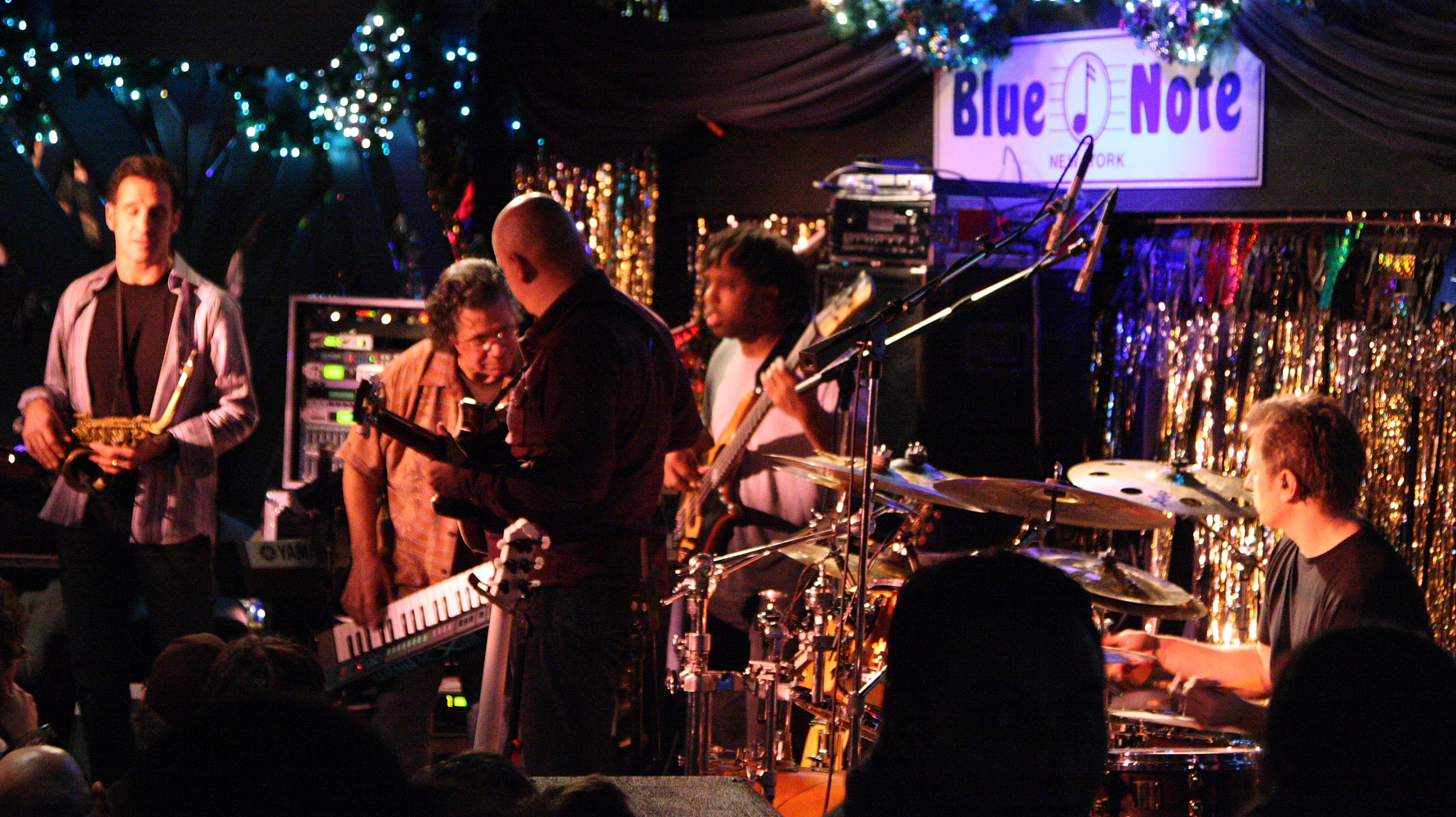
Chick Corea Elektric Band at the club in 2007

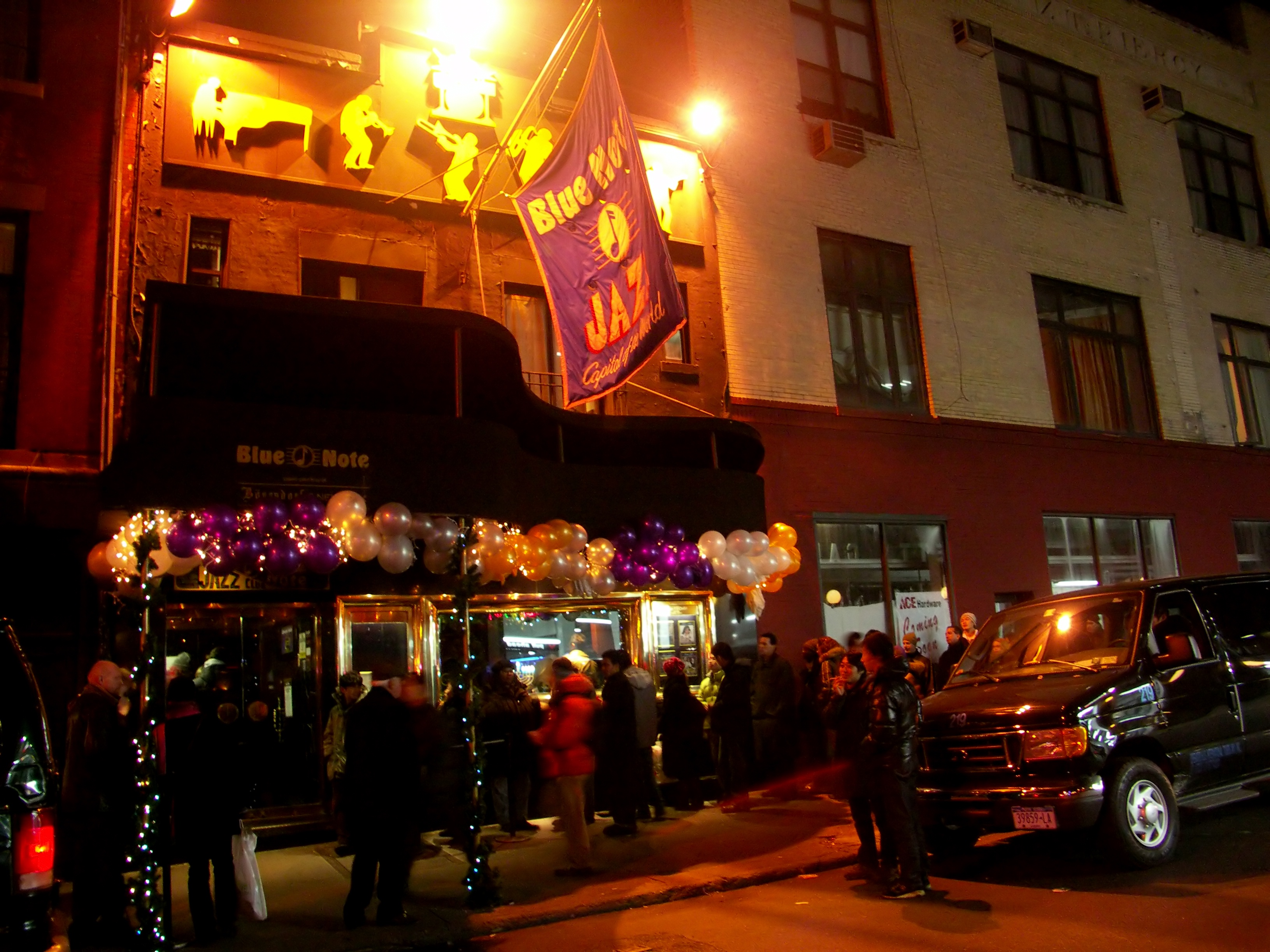
Blue Note Jazz Club, New Year's Day, 2006

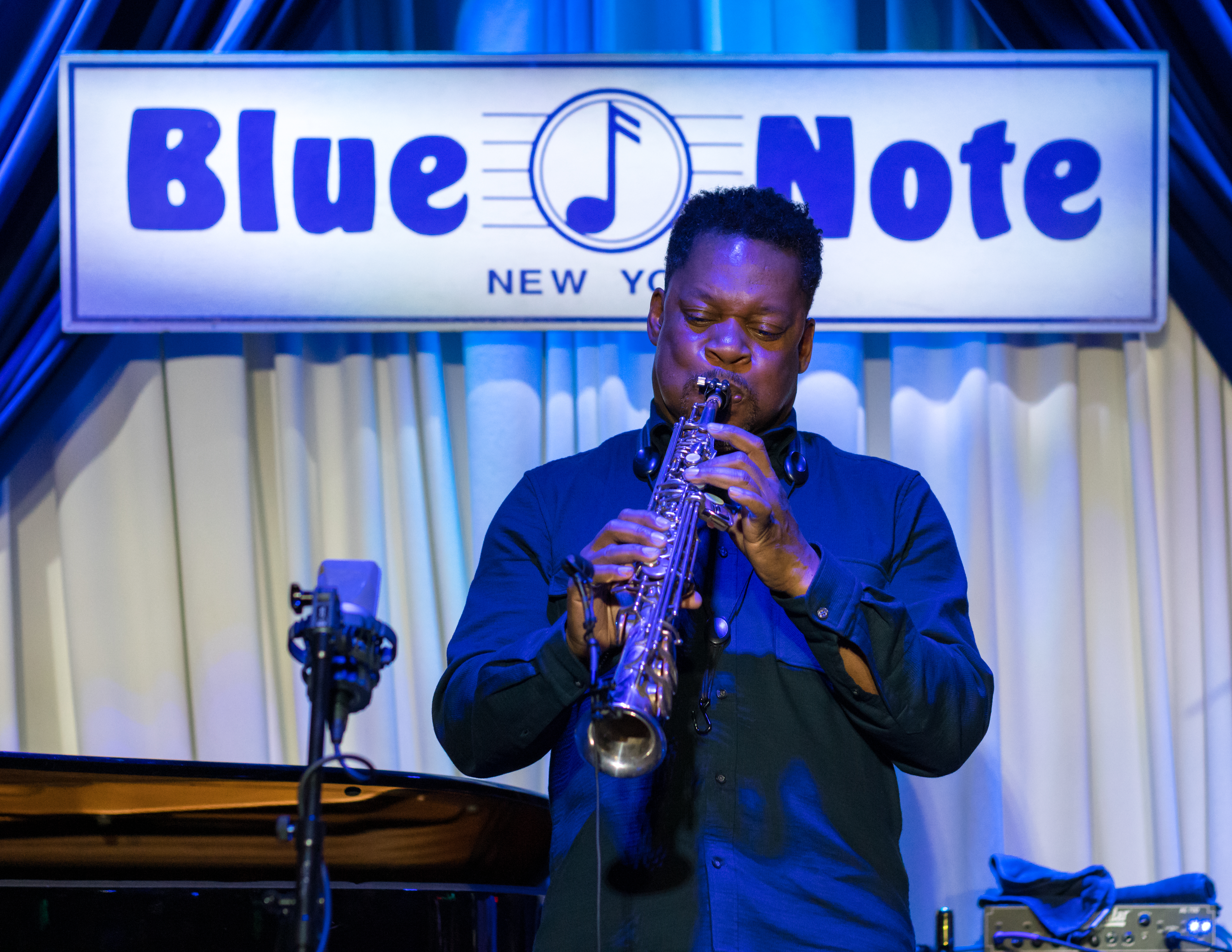
Ravi Coltrane playing at the Blue Note, New York City, in 2023

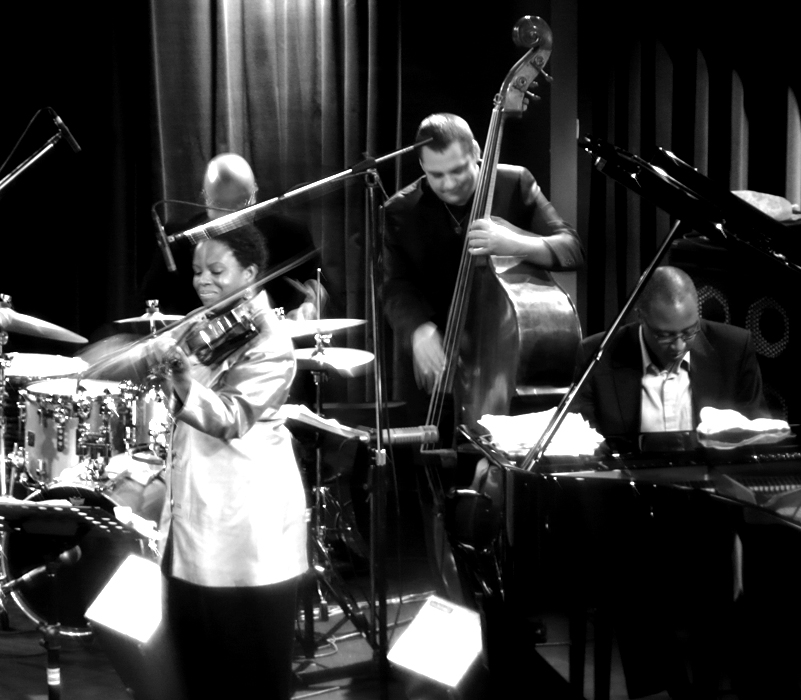
Violinist Regina Carter performing at Blue Note Milano in Milan, in 2007
