= Inner Voices =

Studio album by McCoy Tyner
- Released: 1977
- Recorded: September 1–2, 6–8, 1977
- Genre: Jazz
- Label: Milestone
- Producer: Orrin Keepnews

McCoy Tyner chronology
| Supertrios (1977) | Inner Voices (1977) | The Greeting (1978) |

Professional ratings
Review scores
| Source | Rating |
|---|---|
| Allmusic | 3/5 stars |
| DownBeat | 4/5 stars |
| The Rolling Stone Jazz Record Guide | 3/5 stars |

Inner Voices is a 1977 album by jazz pianist McCoy Tyner, his twelfth to be released on the Milestone label. It was recorded in September 1977 and features performances by Tyner with bassist Ron Carter, guitarist Earl Klugh, drummers Jack DeJohnette and Eric Gravatt, a twelve-piece horn section, and a seven-member chorus.

== Reception ==
The AllMusic review by Scott Yanow states, "In reality, the voices were not needed (they stick out as a bit of a frivolity), but Tyner plays as strong as usual; he has yet to record an uninspired solo."

== Track listing ==
1. "For Tomorrow" - 6:07
2. "Uptown" - 7:30
3. "Rotunda" - 6:46
4. "Opus" - 9:35
5. "Festival in Bahia" - 10:08

All compositions by McCoy Tyner
- Recorded in NYC, September 1, 2, 6, 7 & 8, 1977

== Personnel ==
- McCoy Tyner – piano, arrangements
- Cecil Bridgewater – trumpet (tracks 2 & 4)
- Jon Faddis – trumpet (tracks 2 & 4)
- Eddie Preston – trumpet (tracks 2 & 4)
- Ernie Royal – trumpet (tracks 2, 4 & 5)
- Dick Griffin – trombone (tracks 2 & 4)
- Janice Robinson – trombone (tracks 2 & 4)
- Charles Stephens – trombone (tracks 2 & 4)
- Earl McIntyre – trombone (tracks 2, 4 & 5)
- Joe Ford – alto saxophone (tracks 2 & 4)
- Jerry Dodgion – alto saxophone (tracks 2 & 4), flute (track 5)
- Alex Foster – tenor saxophone (tracks 2, 4 & 5)
- Ed Xiques – baritone saxophone (tracks 2 & 4), alto saxophone (track 5)
- Earl Klugh – guitar (tracks 2, 3 & 5)
- Ron Carter – bass
- Eric Gravatt – drums (tracks 2 & 4)
- Jack DeJohnette: drums (tracks 3 & 5)
- Guilherme Franco – percussion (track 5)
- Adrienne Anderson– voices (tracks 1, 3, 4 & 5)
- Benjamin Carter – voices (tracks 1, 3, 4 & 5)
- Fran Dorsey – voices (tracks 1, 3, 4 & 5)
- Bessye Ruth Scott – voices (tracks 1, 3, 4 & 5)
- Carl Scott – voices (tracks 1, 3, 4 & 5)
- Suzanne Simmons – voices (tracks 1, 3, 4 & 5)
- Joan Taylor – voices (tracks 1, 3, 4 & 5)
