= Juini Booth =

American jazz bassist (1948–2021)

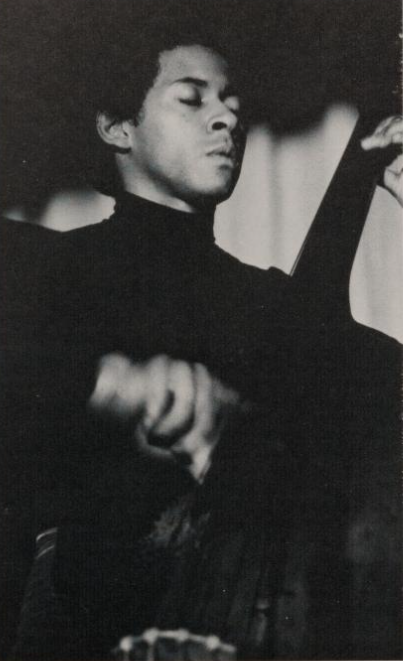

Background information
- Born: February 12, 1948
- Died: July 11, 2021 (aged 73)
- Genres: Jazz
- Instrument(s): Double-bass, Electric bass

Arthur Edward Booth Jr. (February 12, 1948 – July 11, 2021) was an American jazz bassist. His professional name was Juini Booth, though his nickname has been spelled Jiunie, Junie, Joony, Jooney, Joonie, Juni, Juney, and Junius, over the course of his career.

== Career ==
Born in Buffalo, New York, Booth began playing piano at about age eight and switched to cello and then bass at 12. His nickname originated from his older sister's inability to pronounce "Junior" as a child. Both of Booth's parents died in 1961 when he was 13 years old. While at East High School, Booth was a member of string class and played bass in bands. Later he played in the orchestra at Lafayette High School.

He worked with Chuck Mangione in his hometown in 1964–65 before moving to New York City around 1966, where he played with Eddie Harris, Art Blakey (1967), Sonny Simmons (1967–68), Marzette Watts (1966, 1968), Freddie Hubbard (1968–71), and Gary Bartz (1970). He played with Shelly Manne in Hollywood in 1969.

In the early 1970s Booth played with Tony Williams's Lifetime (1971–73) and McCoy Tyner (1973–76), also recording during this time with Larry Young (1973), Takehiro Honda, and Masabumi Kikuchi, the last two during a tour of Tokyo in 1974. After a short period with Hamiett Bluiett in 1976 he returned to Buffalo, though he also worked with Chico Freeman in Los Angeles and Junior Cook in New York in 1977. In 1977–78 he played with Elvin Jones and Charles Tolliver.

From 1980 to 1982 he played with Ernie Krivda in Cleveland, as well as locally in Buffalo. He recorded freelance with Beaver Harris (1983), Steve Grossman and Joe Chambers (1984), Franklin Kiermyer, and others.

Juini Booth began working with Sun Ra starting in 1967 and was one of the Arkestra's longest serving members.

After spending a number of weeks in declining health, Booth died on July 11, 2021, aged 73, in Buffalo.

== Discography ==
With Gary Bartz

- Harlem Bush Music (Milestone, 1970–71)

With Joe Bonner

- Angel Eyes (Muse, 1976)

With Junior Cook

- Pressure Cooker (Catalyst, 1977)

With Chico Freeman

- Beyond the Rain (Contemporary, 1977)

With Steve Grossman

- Way Out East (Red Record, 1984)

With Elvin Jones

- Time Capsule (Vanguard, 1977)

With Franklin Kiermyer

- Further (Mobility Music, 2014)

With Shelly Manne

- Outside (Contemporary, 1969)

With George Spanos

- Dreams Beyond (Evolver Records, 2014)
- Reflections (George Spanos, 2017)

With McCoy Tyner

- Enlightenment (Milestone, 1973)
- Song of the New World (Milestone, 1973)
- Atlantis (Milestone, 1975)
