= Supertrios =

Studio album by McCoy Tyner
- Released: 1977
- Recorded: April 9–12, 1977
- Genre: Jazz
- Length: 76:13
- Label: Milestone
- Producer: Orrin Keepnews

McCoy Tyner chronology
Focal Point (1976)	Supertrios (1977)	Inner Voices (1977)

Supertrios is a 1977 album by jazz pianist McCoy Tyner, his eleventh to be released on the Milestone label. It was recorded in April 1977 and features performances by Tyner with two rhythm sections: bassist Ron Carter and drummer Tony Williams on the first half of the album, and bassist Eddie Gómez and drummer Jack DeJohnette on the second.

== Reception ==
Professional ratings
Review scores
Source	Rating
AllMusic	4/5 stars
The Penguin Guide to Jazz Recordings	3.5/4 stars
The Rolling Stone Jazz Record Guide	5/5 stars

The AllMusic review by Scott Yanow states: "Throughout, the percussive and highly influential pianist sounds inspired by the opportunity to create music with his peers. Recommended".

== Track listing ==
1. "Wave" (Jobim) - 7:27
2. "Blues on the Corner" - 6:28
3. "I Mean You" (Hawkins, Monk) - 4:21
4. "The Greeting" - 7:56
5. "Prelude to a Kiss" (Ellington, Gordon, Mills) - 4:35
6. "Moment's Notice" (Coltrane) - 5:49
7. "Hymn-Song" - 5:11
8. "Consensus" - 9:34
9. "Four by Five" - 5:30
10. "Stella by Starlight" (Washington, Young) - 8:05
11. "Lush Life" (Strayhorn) - 6:24
12. "Blues for Ball" - 4:53

All compositions by McCoy Tyner except as indicated
- Recorded at Fantasy Studios, Berkeley, CA, April 9 & 10 (tracks 1–6), 11 & 12 (tracks 7–12), 1977.

== Personnel ==
- McCoy Tyner: piano
- Ron Carter: bass (tracks 1–6)
- Tony Williams: drums (tracks 1–6)
- Eddie Gómez: bass (tracks 7–12)
- Jack DeJohnette: drums (tracks 7–12)
