= Wilby Fletcher =

American jazz drummer (1954–2009)

- Born: Wilbert Blaine Fletcher; October 18, 1954; Wilmington, Delaware, U.S.
- Died: October 15, 2009 (aged 54) Wilmington, Delaware, U.S.
- Genre: Jazz
- Occupation: Musician
- Instrument: Drums
- Years active: 1969–2000s
- Formerly of: McCoy Tyner Quintet
- Education: Berklee College of Music

Wilbert "Wilby" Blaine Fletcher (October 18, 1954 – October 15, 2009) was an American jazz drummer.

== Early life ==
Fletcher began playing the drums at the age of four, attended George Gray Elementary School in Wilmington, Delaware, and graduated from P. S. DuPont High School. He then studied at the Berklee College of Music in Boston. Already at the age of 15, he began working as a professional drummer.

== Career ==
In the 1970s, he succeeded Alphonse Mouzon in McCoy Tyner's band, with whom he made his first appearance at the Jazz Showcase club in Chicago, without having rehearsed first. He has also worked with Ron Carter, Grover Washington Jr., Charles Fambrough, Lonnie Liston Smith, Bobby Watson, and the violinist John Blake, on whose albums Maiden Dance and A Twinkling of an Eye he contributed; he also appeared with Michel Petrucciani, Roy Ayers, and Harry Belafonte.

== Later years ==
For several years, Fletcher was house drummer at Trump Castle in Atlantic City, New Jersey, and worked for the Alvin Ailey Dance Company in New York City. In the field of jazz, Fletcher was a part of 31 recording sessions between 1974 and 2007.

== Legacy ==
In 2018, a street in Wilmington, Delaware, was named after him.

== Discography ==
With Roy Ayers

- Change Up the Groove (Polydor, 1974)

With McCoy Tyner

- Atlantis (Milestone, 1975)
- Dimensions (Elektra/Musician, 1984)
