= Sherab =

Sherab may refer to:

- Chetsun Sherab Jungnay, eleventh century Tibetan Abbot and scholar who founded the Shalu Monastery south of Shigatse, Tibet
- Dolpopa Sherab Gyaltsen (1292–1361), Tibetan Buddhist master known as "The Buddha from Dolpo"
- Khenchen Palden Sherab, scholar and lama in the Nyingma school of Tibetan Buddhism
- Khenpo Sherab Sangpo, trained by Khenpo Petse Rinpoche and Jigme Phuntsok Rinpoche, two of the greatest masters of the Nyingma tradition in recent history
- Ngok Loden Sherab (1059–1109), important in the transmission of Buddhism from India to Tibet
- Sherab Gyeltshen (born c. 1955), a Bhutanese politician and the incumbent Minister for Home and Cultural Affairs
- Sherab Palden Beru (1911–2012), exiled Tibetan thangka artist who has played a key role in preserving the art-form
