= Atlantis (McCoy Tyner album) =

Live album by McCoy Tyner
- Released: June 1975
- Recorded: August 31–September 1, 1974
- Venue: Keystone Korner, San Francisco
- Genre: Jazz
- Length: 71:37
- Label: Milestone; M-55002
- Producer: Orrin Keepnews

McCoy Tyner chronology
Sama Layuca (1974)	Atlantis (1975)	Trident (1975)

Atlantis is a live album by jazz pianist McCoy Tyner released on the Milestone label. It was recorded at the Keystone Korner in San Francisco on August 31 and September 1, 1974, and features Tyner in performance with saxophonist Azar Lawrence, bassist Juini Booth, drummer Wilby Fletcher and percussionist Guilherme Franco.

== Reception ==
Professional ratings
Review scores
Source	Rating
Allmusic	4/5 stars
Penguin Guide to Jazz	3/3 stars 1/1 star
The Rolling Stone Jazz Record Guide	4/5 stars

Scott Yanow, writing for Allmusic, notes that "Tyner creates some very powerful and highly original solos, really tearing into some of the more extended pieces... Essential music that still sounds fresh and adventurous". Richard Cook and Brian Morton, authors of The Penguin Guide to Jazz, opine that the both Enlightenment and Atlantis are "two huge, sprawling concert recordings which will drain most listeners: Tyner's piano outpourings seem unstoppable, and Lawrence comes on as an even fierier spirit than Fortune, even if both are in thrall to Coltrane."

== Track listing ==
All music is composed by McCoy Tyner, except where noted.

No.	Title	Writer(s)	Length
1.	"Atlantis"		17:59
2.	"In a Sentimental Mood"	Duke Ellington, Manny Kurtz, Irving Mills	5:39
3.	"Makin' Out"		13:04
4.	"My One and Only Love"	Guy Wood, Robert Mellin	9:59
5.	"Pursuit"		9:20
6.	"Love Samba"		15:56

Recorded on August 31 (tracks 3, 5) and September 1, 1974 (tracks 1, 2, 4 and 6).

== Personnel ==
- McCoy Tyner - piano
- Azar Lawrence - tenor saxophone, soprano saxophone (tracks 1, 3, 4–6)
- Guilherme Franco - percussion (tracks 1, 3, 4–6)
- Joony Booth - bass (tracks 1, 3, 5–6)
- Wilby Fletcher - drums (tracks 1, 3, 5–6)
