= Eric Gravatt =

American jazz drummer (born 1947)

- Born: Eric Kamau Gravatt; March 6, 1947 (age 79); Philadelphia, Pennsylvania, United States
- Genres: Jazz fusion, post bop
- Occupations: Musician educator Prison guard
- Instrument: Drums
- Years active: 1965–present
- Labels: Columbia, ECM

Eric Kamau Grávátt (born March 6, 1947) is an American jazz drummer. He has played with McCoy Tyner, Joe Henderson, Weather Report, Byard Lancaster, and Dom Um Romão. He was a member of Weather Report from 1972–1974.

== Discography ==
As a member of Weather Report

- I Sing the Body Electric (Columbia, 1972)
- Live in Tokyo (CBS/Sony, 1972)
- Sweetnighter (Columbia, 1973)

With Lloyd McNeill

- Asha (1969)
- Washington Suite (1970)

With McCoy Tyner

- Focal Point (Milestone, 1976)
- Inner Voices (Milestone, 1977)

With others

- Byard Lancaster, It's Not Up to Us (Vortex, 1968)
- Julian Priester, Love, Love (ECM, 1974)
- Eddie Henderson, Inside Out (Capricorn, 1974)
- Joe Henderson, Canyon Lady (Milestone, 1975)
- Tony Hymas, Hope Street MN (nato, 2002)
