= Focal Point (album) =

Studio album by McCoy Tyner
- Released: 1976
- Recorded: August 4–7, 1976
- Studio: Fantasy Studios, Berkeley, CA
- Genre: Jazz, post-bop, modal jazz
- Label: Milestone M 9072
- Producer: Orrin Keepnews

McCoy Tyner chronology
Fly with the Wind (1976)	Focal Point (1976)	Supertrios (1977)

Professional ratings
Review scores
Source	Rating
Allmusic	4/5 stars
All About Jazz	(Positive)
The Rolling Stone Jazz Record Guide	3/5 stars
Penguin Guide to Jazz Recordings	3.5/4 stars

Focal Point is a 1976 album by jazz pianist McCoy Tyner, his tenth to be released on the Milestone label. It was recorded during four days in August 1976 and features a septet fronted by three reed players (Gary Bartz, Joe Ford and Ron Bridgewater) who were in part multiplied through overdubs. On one track Tyner is heard picking a dulcimer backed by tablas, evoking the sound of an Indian sitar. "Parody" is a duo with Eric Gravatt on drums. The album was digitally remastered at Fantasy Studios in 1999 and re-released on Original Jazz Classics.

== Reception ==
Cook and Morton in their Penguin Guide to Jazz write that "Focal Point looks to secure the firepower in the studio which the band generated in concert", but they suggest that the overdubbing of the horns "sometimes leads to stiffness in the ensemble sound". Nevertheless they "were a little surprised to find how well it's aged". The Allmusic review by Scott Yanow states "Because virtually all of McCoy Tyner's records are superior examples of modal-oriented jazz, this gem is merely an above-average effort".

== Track listing ==
1. "Mes trois fils" - 7:56
2. "Parody" - 6:55
3. "Indo-Serenade" - 5:35
4. "Mode for Dulcimer" - 8:59
5. "Departure" - 5:58
6. "Theme for Nana" - 5:14

All compositions by McCoy Tyner

== Personnel ==
- McCoy Tyner: piano, dulcimer (“Mode for Dulcimer” only)
- Joe Ford: alto saxophone, soprano saxophone, flute (except “Parody”)
- Gary Bartz: alto saxophone, soprano saxophone, sopranino saxophone, clarinet (except “Parody”)
- Ron Bridgewater: tenor saxophone, soprano saxophone (except “Parody”)
- Charles Fambrough: bass (except “Parody”)
- Eric Kamau Gravatt: drums
- Guilherme Franco: conga and percussion (except “Parody”), tabla (“Mode for Dulcimer” only)
