= Barcelona (Joe Henderson album) =

Studio album / Live album by Joe Henderson
- Released: 1979
- Recorded: June 2, 1977 & November 5, 1978
- Venues: Wichita State University, KS
- Studios: Trixi Studio, Munich, Germany
- Genre: Jazz
- Length: 37:59
- Labels: Enja; 3037
- Producers: Horst Weber and Matthias Winckelmann

Joe Henderson chronology
Black Narcissus (1976)	Barcelona (1979)	Relaxin' at Camarillo (1979)

Barcelona is an album by American jazz saxophonist Joe Henderson featuring an extended live track recorded in 1977 and two studio recordings from 1978 in West Germany which was released on the Enja label in 1979. Henderson appears in a trio with bassist Wayne Darling and drummer Ed Soph.

== Reception ==
Professional ratings
Review scores
Source	Rating
AllMusic	4/5 stars
DownBeat	4/5 stars

The AllMusic review by Ron Wynn states "After many years of obscurity, Henderson has become famous in the last few years. But the whirling lines, huge tone, and astonishing solos that he routinely offers on this album have been prized by jazz fans since the early '60s".

== Track listing ==
All compositions by Joe Henderson

1. "Barcelona" – 20:20
2. "Barcelona" [continued] – 7:37
3. "Mediterranean Sun" – 4:50
4. "Y Ya la Quiero" – 5:12

== Personnel ==
- Joe Henderson – tenor saxophone
- Wayne Darling – bass
- Ed Soph – drums
