= Trident (McCoy Tyner album) =

Studio album by McCoy Tyner
- Released: 1975
- Recorded: February 18–19, 1975
- Studios: Fantasy Studios, Berkeley
- Genre: Jazz
- Length: 40:47
- Labels: Milestone; MSP 9063
- Producer: Orrin Keepnews

McCoy Tyner chronology
Atlantis (1975)	Trident (1975)	Fly with the Wind (1976)

Trident is a 1975 album by jazz pianist McCoy Tyner (1938–2020), his eighth to be released on the Milestone label. It was recorded in February 1975 and features performances by Tyner with bassist Ron Carter (born 1937) and his former John Coltrane bandmate, drummer Elvin Jones (1927–2004). It is available on CD. Unusually, Tyner plays harpsichord and celesta along with piano.

A section of Ron Carter's bass on the track "Impressions" is heavily sampled in Black Sheep's 1991 hip-hop hit "The Choice is Yours."

== Critical reception ==
Professional ratings
Review scores
Source	Rating
Allmusic	4.5/5 stars
The Rolling Stone Jazz Record Guide	5/5 stars
The Penguin Guide to Jazz Recordings	3/4 stars

In a 4.5 out of 5 stars review, Scott Yanow of AllMusic wrote "Pianist McCoy Tyner's first full-length trio album since 1964 was one of his most popular... this set finds Tyner in peak form". Will Smith of the Omaha World-Herald commented "A triumvirate in the jazz world has been assembled by pianist McCoy Tyner for 'Trident.' Joining Tyner are bassist Ron Carter and drummer Elvin Jones. The results are predictable - brilliant, emphatic, fervent."

== Track listing ==
All compositions by McCoy Tyner except as indicated

1. "Celestial Chant" - 7:00
2. "Once I Loved" (de Moraes, Gilbert, Jobim) - 7:53
3. "Elvin (Sir) Jones" - 5:27
4. "Land of the Lonely" - 7:33
5. "Impressions" (Coltrane) - 5:03
6. "Ruby, My Dear" (Monk) - 7:51

== Personnel ==
- McCoy Tyner - piano (all tracks), harpsichord (tracks 1 & 4), celeste (tracks 2 & 4)
- Ron Carter - bass
- Elvin Jones - drums
