= Fly with the Wind =

Studio album by McCoy Tyner
- Released: 1976
- Recorded: January 19–21, 1976
- Genre: Jazz, third stream
- Length: 38:44
- Label: Milestone
- Producer: Orrin Keepnews

McCoy Tyner chronology
Trident (1975)	Fly with the Wind (1976)	Focal Point (1976)

Fly with the Wind is a 1976 album by jazz pianist McCoy Tyner, his ninth to be released on the Milestone label. It was recorded in January 1976 and features performances by Tyner with a trio, woodwinds and a full string section. The 2008 CD reissue added two alternate takes as bonus tracks.

== Reception ==
Professional ratings
Review scores
Source	Rating
AllMusic	4/5 stars
The Penguin Guide to Jazz Recordings	2/4 stars
The Rolling Stone Jazz Record Guide	3/5 stars

The AllMusic review by Scott Yanow states that the album "...has plenty of memorable moments and is a surprising but logical success; Tyner's orchestral piano blended with the strings very well." Chris Sheridan of Jazz Journal thought the album "possesses a winning boldness and vitality". He commended Tyner, whose music he described as "thickly-textured, and both melodically and rhythmically complex", but criticized the "ostinato motif" of "You Stepped out of a Dream", describing it as "a little mundane".

== Track listing ==
1. "Fly with the Wind" - 8:30
2. "Salvadore de Samba" - 12:13
3. "Beyond the Sun" - 5:33
4. "You Stepped out of a Dream" (Brown, Kahn) - 6:55
5. "Rolem" - 5:43
6. "Beyond the Sun" [alternate take] - 5:08 Bonus track on 2008 reissue
7. "Rolem" [alternate take] - 5:15 Bonus track on 2008 reissue

All compositions by McCoy Tyner except as indicated

  - Recorded at Fantasy Studios, Berkeley, CA, January 19, 20 & 21, 1976

== Personnel ==
- McCoy Tyner – piano
- Ron Carter – bass
- Billy Cobham – drums
- Hubert Laws – flute, alto flute
- Paul Renzi – piccolo, flute
- Raymond Duste – oboe
- Stuart Canin – violin
- Franklin Foster – violin
- Daniel Kobialka – violin
- Peter Schaffer – violin
- Edmund Weingart – violin
- Myra Bucky – violin (tracks 1 & 3)
- Mark Volkert – violin (tracks 4 & 5)
- Selwart Clarke – viola
- Daniel Yale – viola
- Sally Kell – cello
- Kermit Moore – cello
- Linda Wood – harp
- Guilherme Franco – tambourine
