= The Elements (Joe Henderson album) =

Studio album by Joe Henderson
- Released: Mid May 1974
- Recorded: October 15 & 17, 1973; The Village Recorder, Los Angeles
- Genre: Post-bop, avant-garde jazz, jazz fusion
- Length: 41:36
- Label: Milestone; MSP 9053
- Producer: Orrin Keepnews

Joe Henderson chronology
Multiple (1973)	The Elements (1974)	Canyon Lady (1973)

The Elements is an album by the American saxophonist Joe Henderson, released in 1974 on Milestone. The musicians included violinist Michael White, bassist Charlie Haden, drummer Leon Chancler, percussionist Kenneth Nash, and featured guest Alice Coltrane on keyboards & harp.

Professional ratings
Review scores
Source	Rating
AllMusic	3.5/5 stars
The Penguin Guide to Jazz Recordings	2.5/4 stars
The Rolling Stone Jazz Record Guide	2/5 stars

== Track listing ==
All songs were composed by Joe Henderson.

Side one

1. "Fire" – 11:08
2. "Air" – 9:50

Side two

1. "Water" – 7:31
2. "Earth" – 13:07

Recorded on October 15 (2–3) and 17 (1, 4), 1973.

== Personnel ==
- Joe Henderson – tenor saxophone, flute, alto flute
- Alice Coltrane – piano, harp, tanpura, harmonium
- Michael White – violin
- Charlie Haden – bass
- Leon "Ndugu" Chancler – drums (1, 4)
- Kenneth Nash – congas, North African Sakara drum, bells, gong, percussion, flute (3), narrator (4)
- Baba Duru Oshun – tabla, percussion
