= Solo: Live from San Francisco =

Live album by McCoy Tyner
- Released: August 25, 2009
- Recorded: May 6, 2007
- Studio: The Herbst Theatre, San Francisco
- Genre: Jazz
- Length: 50:25
- Label: McCoy Tyner Music

McCoy Tyner chronology
Guitars (2008)	Solo: Live from San Francisco (2009)

Professional ratings
Review scores
Source	Rating
AllMusic	4/5 stars

Solo: Live from San Francisco is a live album by McCoy Tyner released in 2009 on his label, McCoy Tyner Music, a subsidiary of Half Note Records. The album was recorded at the Herbst Theatre as part of the San Francisco Jazz Festival's Spring Series in May 2007 and features a solo performance by Tyner.

== Reception ==
The AllMusic review by Michael G. Nastos states that "Tyner tackles the solo spotlight once again, as his talent rises, soars, and takes off while the program continues for some 50 minutes. All of the hallmarks of his sound, from up and down dynamics to the legendary crashing of chords, especially with his left hand, and the stunning virtuosity of his improvisational runs and streaks, assure you that he is in good spirits and has energy to burn off even at his advanced age... This is yet another of the many triumphant recordings Tyner has given to the world, and though always challenging for any solo artist, he easily pulls it off with nary a hitch, much spirit, and a ton of soul".

== Track listing ==
All compositions by McCoy Tyner except were indicated

1. "African Village" – 3:59
2. "I Should Care" (Nat Cross, Jerry Williams Jr.) – 5:05
3. "Lazy Bird" (John Coltrane) – 4:10
4. "Naima" (Coltrane) – 4:23
5. "Just Feelin'" – 5:33
6. "You Taught My Heart to Sing" – 4:43
7. "Blues for Jeff" – 4:47
8. "Ballad for Aisha" – 5:41
9. "Sweet and Lovely" (Gus Arnheim, Charles Daniels, Harry Tobias) – 4:10
10. "Angelina" – 4:07
11. "In a Mellow Tone" (Duke Ellington) – 3:47

== Personnel ==
- McCoy Tyner – piano
- Steven Bensusan – executive producer
- Jeff Levenson – producer, liner notes
- Phil Edwards – engineer
- Steve Remote – engineer
- Greg Calbi – mastering
- Jon D'Uva – digital editing, mixing
