= Azar Lawrence =

American jazz saxophonist (born 1952)

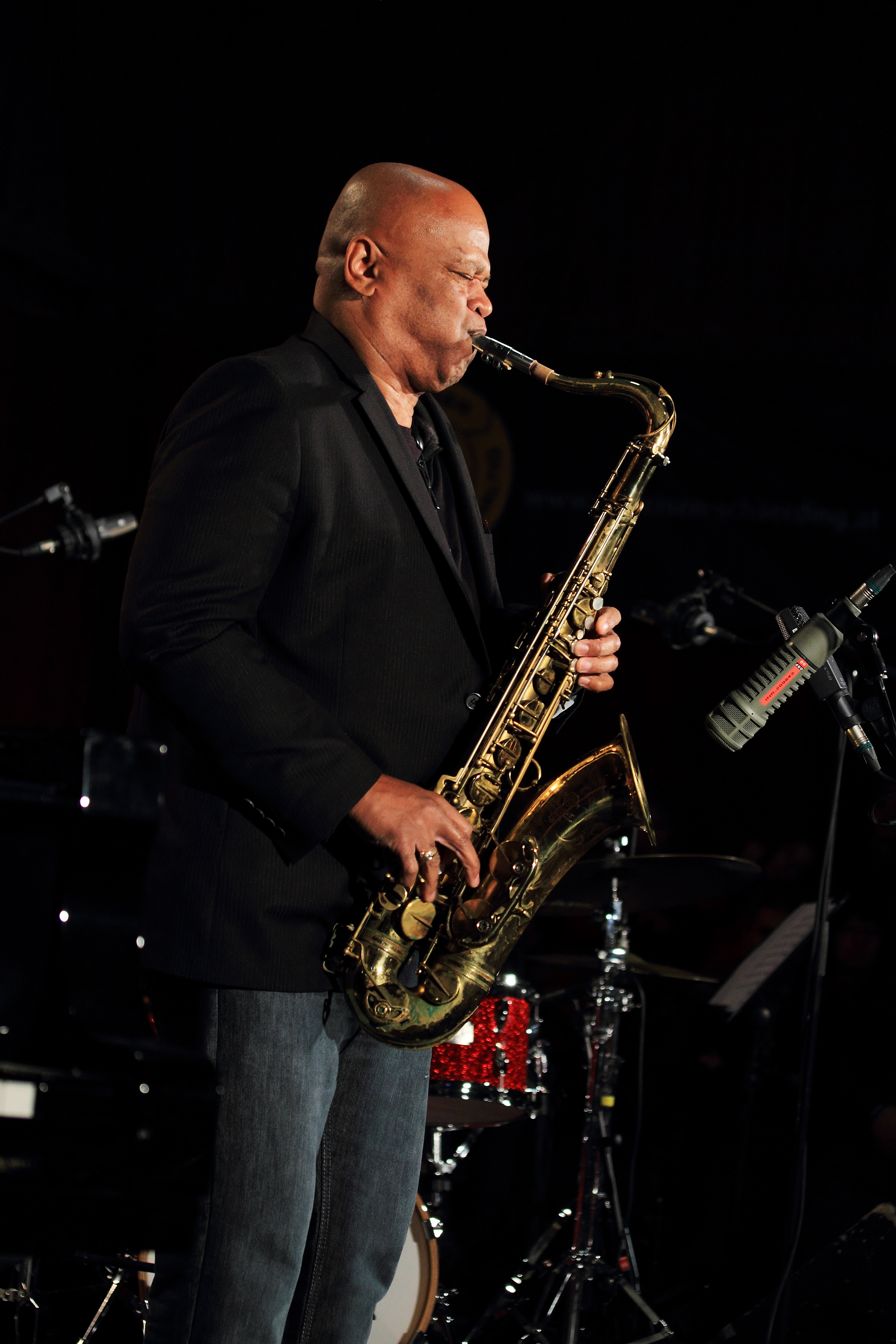

Azar Lawrence (born November 3, 1952) is an American jazz saxophonist, known for his contributions as sideman to McCoy Tyner, Miles Davis, Freddie Hubbard, and Woody Shaw.

== Career ==
Lawrence released Summer Solstice on Prestige Records in 1975, produced by Orrin Keepnews. It featured Raul de Souza, Gerald Hayes, Amaury Tristão, Dom Salvador, Ron Carter, Guilherme Franco on the songs "Novo Ano" and "Highway" which were composed by Amaury Tristão, and Lawrence, Souza, Albert Dailey, Carter and Billy Hart on all other selections.

Bridge Into The New Age featured Jean Carn, Woody Shaw, Ray Straughter, Woody Murray, Clint Houston, Billy Hart, Guillerme Franco, Julian Priester, Hadley Caliman, Black Arthur, Joe Bonner, John Heard, Leon "Ndugu" Chancler, Mtume and Kenneth Nash.

People Moving featured Patrice Rushen, Jerry Peters, Michael Stanton, John Rowin, Lee Ritenour, Paul Jackson, Jr., Harvey Mason, Ernest Straughter.

Musician and screenwriter Herbert Baker taught music and mentored Lawrence, who recalled Baker as "one of the greatest pianists who ever lived."

== Discography ==
=== As leader ===
- 1974: Bridge into the New Age (Prestige)
- 1975: Summer Solstice (Prestige)
- 1976: People Moving (Prestige)
- 1985: Shadow Dancing (Riza)
- 2007: Legacy & Music of John Coltrane (Clarion Jazz) - with Edwin Bayard
- 2008: Prayer For My Ancestors (Furthermore) - with Nate Morgan
- 2009: Speak the Word (Zarman Productions) - with Nate Morgan
- 2010: Mystic Journey (Furthermore) - with Eddie Henderson
- 2014: The Seeker (Sunnyside, recorded 2011) -with Nicholas Payton
- 2015: Conduit (Intofocus) - with Al McLean
- 2016: Frontiers (Cellar Live) - with Al McLean
- 2018: Elementals (HighNote)
- 2022: New Sky (Trazer)

=== As sideman ===
With Mulatu Astatke

- Timeless (2010, Mochilla)

With Henry Butler

- Fivin' Around (1986, Impulse!/MCA)

With Miles Davis

- Dark Magus (1977, Columbia, recorded 1974)

With Henry Franklin

- If We Should Meet Again (2007, Skipper Productions)
- O, What A Beautiful Morning! (2008, Skipper Productions)
- Home Cookin' (2009, Skipper Productions)

With Gene Harris

- In a Special Way (1976, Blue Note)

With Freddie Hubbard

- Bundle of Joy (1977, Columbia)

With Elvin Jones

- New Agenda (1975, Vanguard)

With Franklin Kiermyer

- Further (2014, Mobility Music)

With Woody Shaw

- The Moontrane (1974, Muse)

With The 360 Degree Music Experience

- In: Sanity (1976, Black Saint)

With McCoy Tyner

- Enlightenment (1973, Milestone)
- Sama Layuca (1974, Milestone)
- Atlantis (1974, Milestone)

With Harry Whitaker

- Black Renaissance (1976, Bay State/Ubiquity)

With Eden Atwood

- Like Someone in Love (2010, Sinatra Society of Japan)
