= Black Miracle =

Studio album by Joe Henderson
- Released: 1976
- Recorded: February 13–14, 1975
- Studio: Fantasy Studios, Berkeley, CA
- Genre: Jazz
- Label: Milestone; MSP 9066
- Producer: Orrin Keepnews & Joe Henderson

Joe Henderson chronology
Canyon Lady (1975)	Black Miracle (1976)	Black Narcissus (1976)

Black Miracle is an album by saxophonist Joe Henderson which was recorded in 1975 and released on the Milestone label in 1976. Musicians include keyboardist George Duke, guitarist Lee Ritenour, bassist Ron Carter, drummer Harvey Mason and a brass section.

== Reception ==
Professional ratings
Review scores
Source	Rating
Allmusic	3/5 stars

Vincent Thomas of Allmusic said "Black Miracle was a decidedly softer album with enough pop elements to make it (dare it be said) "easy listening" for a wide range of jazz heads".

== Track listing ==
All compositions by Joe Henderson except as indicated

1. "Solution" – 7:05
2. "My Cherie Amour" (Henry Cosby, Stevie Wonder, Sylvia Moy) – 6:44
3. "Gazelle" – 5:23
4. "Black Miracle" – 9:34
5. "Immaculate Deception" – 4:12
6. "Old Slippers" (George Duke) – 5:59

== Personnel ==
- Joe Henderson – tenor saxophone
- Oscar Brashear, Snooky Young – trumpet, flugelhorn
- George Bohanon – trombone
- Don Waldrop – bass trombone, tuba
- Hadley Caliman – flute, tenor saxophone
- Dawilli Gonga – electric piano, clavinet, synthesizer
- Lee Ritenour – guitar
- Ron Carter – electric bass
- Harvey Mason – drums
- Bill Summers – percussion
