= Song of the New World =

Studio album by McCoy Tyner
- Released: July 1973
- Recorded: April 6 & 9, 1973
- Studio: A & R Studios, New York City
- Genre: Jazz
- Length: 41:24
- Label: Milestone; MSP 9049
- Producer: Orrin Keepnews

McCoy Tyner chronology
Song for My Lady (1972)	Song of the New World (1973)	Enlightenment (1973)

Song of the New World is a 1973 album by jazz pianist McCoy Tyner, his fourth to be released on the Milestone label. It was recorded in April 1973 and features performances by Tyner with a big band including saxophonist Sonny Fortune, flautist Hubert Laws, bassist Joony Booth and drummer Alphonse Mouzon along with a brass section, and a full string section on two tracks conducted by William Fischer.

== Reception ==
Professional ratings
Review scores
Source	Rating
AllMusic	4/5 stars
The Penguin Guide to Jazz Recordings	2.5/4 stars
The Rolling Stone Jazz Record Guide	4/5 stars

The AllMusic review by Scott Yanow states: "The powerful pianist is in fine form and the main soloist throughout. Most memorable is the title cut and a reworking of 'Afro Blue'."

== Track listing ==
1. "Afro Blue" (Santamaría) - 10:01
2. "Little Brother" - 10:12
3. "The Divine Love" - 7:31
4. "Some Day" - 6:50
5. "Song of the New World" - 6:50

All compositions by McCoy Tyner except as indicated

== Personnel ==
- McCoy Tyner: piano, percussion
- Hubert Laws: piccolo, flute
- Sonny Fortune: alto saxophone, soprano saxophone, flute
- Joony Booth: bass
- Alphonse Mouzon: drums
- Cecil Bridgewater: trumpet (tracks 1, 2 & 4)
- Jon Faddis: trumpet (tracks 1, 2 & 4)
- Virgil Jones: trumpet (tracks 1, 2 & 4)
- Garnett Brown: trombone (tracks 1, 2 & 4)
- Dick Griffin: trombone, baritone trombone (tracks 1, 2 & 4)
- Willie Ruff: french horn (tracks 1, 2 & 4)
- William Warnick III: french horn (tracks 1, 2 & 4)
- Julius Watkins: french horn (tracks 1, 2 & 4)
- Kiane Zawadi: euphonium (tracks 1, 2 & 4)
- Bob Stewart: tuba (tracks 1, 2 & 4)
- Sonny Morgan: conga drums (tracks 1 & 2)
- Harry Smyle: oboe (tracks 3 & 5)
- Sanford Allen: violin (tracks 3 & 5)
- John Blair: violin (tracks 3 & 5)
- Selwart Clarke: violin (tracks 3 & 5)
- Winston Collymore: violin (tracks 3 & 5)
- Noel DaCosta: violin (tracks 3 & 5)
- Marie Hence: violin (tracks 3 & 5)
- Julian Barber: viola (tracks 3 & 5)
- Alfred Brown: viola (tracks 3 & 5)
- Ronald Lipscomb: cello (tracks 3 & 5)
- Kermit Moore: cello (tracks 3 & 5)
- William Fischer: conductor (tracks 3 & 5)
