= Bridge into the New Age =

Studio album by Azar Lawrence
- Released: 1975
- Recorded: May–September 1974
- Studio: Fantasy Recording Studios, Berkeley, California
- Genre: Jazz
- Label: Prestige; PR 10086
- Producer: Orrin Keepnews and Jim Stern

Azar Lawrence chronology
Bridge into the New Age (1975)	Summer Solstice (1975)

Bridge into the New Age is an album by saxophonist Azar Lawrence which was recorded in 1974 and released on the Prestige label.

== Reception ==
Professional ratings
Review scores
Source	Rating
Allmusic	4/5 stars

The Allmusic site awarded the album 4 stars.

== Track listing ==
All compositions by Azar Lawrence.

1. "Bridge into the New Age" – 6:45
2. "Fatisha" – 4:05
3. "Warriors of Peace" – 7:59
4. "Forces of Nature" – 8:41
5. "The Beautiful and Omnipresent Love" – 10:07

== Personnel ==
- Azar Lawrence – soprano saxophone, tenor saxophone
- Woody Shaw – trumpet (tracks 1 & 5)
- Julian Priester – trombone (track 4)
- Arthur Blythe (“Black Arthur”) – alto saxophone (tracks 3 & 4)
- Hadley Caliman – flute (track 4)
- Ray Straughter – wood flute (track 5)
- Joe Bonner – piano (tracks 2–4)
- Woody Murray – vibraphone (tracks 1 & 5)
- John Heard (tracks 3 & 4), Clint Houston (tracks 1 & 5) – bass
- Billy Hart (tracks 1 & 5), Ndugu (tracks 3 & 4) – drums
- Mtume – congas, percussion (tracks 3 & 4)
- Guilherme Franco (tracks 1 & 5), Kenneth Nash (tracks 2 & 5) – percussion
- Jean Carn – vocals (tracks 1 & 5)
