= I Sing the Body Electric (album) =

1972 studio album, with 3 live recordings, by Weather Report

Studio album with 3 live recordings by Weather Report
- Released: May 26, 1972
- Recorded: November 1971; January 13, 1972
- Venues: Shibuya Kokaido Hall, Tokyo, Japan
- Studios: Columbia Recording Studios, New York City
- Genre: Jazz fusion
- Length: 46:28
- Label: Columbia
- Producer: Shoviza Productions

Weather Report chronology
Live in Tokyo (1972)	I Sing the Body Electric (1972)	Sweetnighter (1973)

I Sing the Body Electric is the second studio album released by the American jazz fusion band Weather Report in 1972.

== Recording ==
The album includes two new members of the band: percussionist Dom Um Romão and drummer Eric Gravatt. The last three tracks were recorded live in concert in Tokyo, Japan on January 13, 1972. These tracks have been edited for this album and can be heard in their entirety on Weather Report's 1972 import album Live in Tokyo.

== Title ==
The album takes its name from an 1855 poem by Walt Whitman and a 1969 short story by Ray Bradbury.

== Critical reception ==
Professional ratings
Review scores
Source	Rating
AllMusic	4/5 stars
Christgau's Record Guide	B
The Penguin Guide to Jazz Recordings	3.5/4 stars
Rolling Stone	(not rated)
The Rolling Stone Jazz Record Guide	5/5 stars
Sputnikmusic	3.5/5

In his review for AllMusic Richard S. Ginell writes that "The studio tracks are more biting, more ethnically diverse in influence, and more laden with electronic effects and grandiose structural complexities than before. The live material (heard in full on the import Live in Tokyo) is even fiercer and showcases for the first time some of the tremendous drive WR was capable of, though it doesn't give you much of an idea of its stream of consciousness nature." Reviewing in Christgau's Record Guide: Rock Albums of the Seventies (1981), Robert Christgau wrote: "Significantly less Milesian than their debut, which is impressive but not necessarily good—the difference is that this is neater, more antiseptic, its bottom less dirty and its top less sexy. I find myself interested but never engaged, and I'm sure one piece is a flop—'Crystal', described by the annotator as 'about' time. Sing the body electric and I'm with you. Sing the body short-circuited and you'd better turn me on."

== Track listing ==
Side A
No.	Title	Writer(s)	Length
1.	"Unknown Soldier"	Josef Zawinul	8:00
2.	"The Moors"	Wayne Shorter	4:45
3.	"Crystal"	Miroslav Vitouš	7:25
4.	"Second Sunday in August"	Zawinul	4:13

Side B
No.	Title	Writer(s)	Length
5.	"Medley: Vertical Invader / T.H. / Dr. Honoris Causa"	Zawinul, Vitouš	10:40
6.	"Surucucú"	Shorter	7:42
7.	"Directions"	Zawinul	4:36
Total length:			46:28

== Personnel ==
Weather Report

- Joe Zawinul - electric & acoustic pianos, synthesizers (ARP 2600)
- Wayne Shorter - saxophones
- Miroslav Vitouš - bass
- Eric Gravatt - drums
- Dom Um Romão - percussion

Guest musicians

- Andrew White - english horn (track A1)
- Hubert Laws, Jr. - flute (track A1)
- Wilmer Wise - D & piccolo trumpets (track A1)
- Yolande Bavan - vocals (track A1)
- Joshie Armstrong - vocals (track A1)
- Chapman Roberts - vocals (track A1)
- Roger Powell - ARP programming (track A1)
- Ralph Towner - 12-string guitar (track A2)

Production

- Robert Devere - executive producer
- Wayne Tarnowski - engineer
- Susumu Satoh - engineer
- Don Meehan - mixing
- Ed Lee - cover design
- Fred Swanson - cover artwork
- Jack Trompetter - cover artwork
