= Enlightenment (McCoy Tyner album) =

Live album by McCoy Tyner
- Released: 1973
- Recorded: July 7, 1973
- Venue: Montreux Jazz Festival
- Genre: Jazz
- Length: 69:44
- Label: Milestone
- Producer: Orrin Keepnews

McCoy Tyner chronology
| Song of the New World (1973) | Enlightenment (1973) | Sama Layuca (1974) |

Enlightenment is a live album by jazz pianist McCoy Tyner released on the Milestone label. It was recorded at the Montreux Jazz Festival in Switzerland on July 7, 1973 and features Tyner in performance with Azar Lawrence, Joony Booth and Alphonse Mouzon.

== Reception ==
Professional ratings
Review scores
| Source | Rating |
|---|---|
| Allmusic | 5/5 stars |
| Penguin Guide to Jazz | 3/3 stars 1/1 star |
| All Music Guide to Jazz (1st ed.) | Landmark recording |
| The Rolling Stone Jazz Record Guide | 5/5 stars |

Scott Yanow, writing for Allmusic, notes that "this is one of the great McCoy Tyner recordings. The powerful, percussive, and highly influential pianist sounds quite inspired throughout his appearance at the 1973 Montreux Jazz Festival".

Richard Cook and Brian Morton, authors of The Penguin Guide to Jazz, opine that Enlightenment and the 1974 live album Atlantis are "two huge, sprawling concert recordings which will drain most listeners: Tyner's piano outpourings seem unstoppable, and Lawrence comes on as an even fierier spirit than [Sonny] Fortune, even if both are in thrall to Coltrane. The Enlightenment set, cut at Montreux, is marginally superior, if only for the pile-driving 'Walk Spirit, Talk Spirit."

Steve Metaliz, writing for Down Beat, noted that:

"since the death of Coltrane, it's been the pianists who've been on the cutting edge of the music's development.... Enlightenment testifies to the brilliant sound of [Tyner's] endeavors. Tyner's inside the instrument, as Coltrane was with the sax, drawing from it colors, textures, and intensities unprecedented in jazz. No wonder the sidemen tend to get lost in the shuffle a bit. Tenor saxophonist Azar Lawrence in particular sometimes seems overwhelmed by the energy emanating from the keyboard; but on the whole he acquits himself well in a role in which it was understandably difficult to retain a distinctive voice. Drummer Al Mouzon deserves special note; his crisp drumming is a good foil for Tyner's shattering polyphony. Enlightenment is a celebration of the epoch of the pianists and also of a musician who has never ceased to grow."

== Track listing ==
All music is composed by McCoy Tyner.

| No. | Title | Length |
|---|---|---|
| 1. | "Presenting the McCoy Tyner Quartet" (Introduced by French disc jockey Pierre Lattès) | 1:19 |
| 2. | "Enlightenment Suite, Part 1 - Genesis" | 10:02 |
| 3. | "Enlightenment Suite, Part 2: The Offering" | 4:00 |
| 4. | "Enlightenment Suite, Part 3 - Inner Glimpse" | 10:04 |
| 5. | "Presence" | 10:35 |
| 6. | "Nebula" | 9:39 |
| 7. | "Walk Spirit, Talk Spirit" | 24:04 |

- Recorded at the Montreux Jazz Festival, Casino De Montreux, Switzerland, July 7, 1973

== Personnel ==
- McCoy Tyner – piano, percussion
- Azar Lawrence – tenor saxophone, soprano saxophone
- Juni Booth – bass
- Alphonse Mouzon – drums
