= Black Narcissus (Joe Henderson album) =

Studio album by Joe Henderson
- Released: Early January 1977
- Recorded: October 1, 3 & 6, 1974 (#1–4)
- Studio: Studios Europa Sonor, Paris; April 26, 1975 (#5–6); Fantasy Studios, Berkeley
- Genre: Jazz
- Length: 40:11
- Label: Milestone; MSP 9071
- Producer: Orrin Keepnews, Joe Henderson

Joe Henderson chronology
Black Miracle (1976)	Black Narcissus (1977)	Barcelona (1977)

Black Narcissus is an album by the American saxophonist Joe Henderson, recorded in 1974, 1975 & 1976, and released in 1977 on Milestone, Henderson's last to be released on the label. The musicians included pianist Joachim Kuhn, bassist Jean-Francois Jenny-Clark, and drummers Jack DeJohnette and Daniel Humair.

Professional ratings
Review scores
Source	Rating
AllMusic	3.5/5 stars

== Track listing ==
1. "Black Narcissus" – 5:09
2. "Hindsight and Forethought" – 2:41
3. "Power to the People" – 12:26
4. "Amoeba" – 5:40
5. "Good Morning Heartache" – 6:57
6. "The Other Side of Right" – 7:18

== Personnel ==
- Joe Henderson – tenor sax
- Joachim Kühn – piano (1–3, 5–6)
- Patrick Gleeson – synthesizer (1–3, 5)
- David Friesen (5), Jean-François Jenny-Clark (1–3, 6) – bass
- Daniel Humair (1–3, 6), Jack DeJohnette (4–5) – drums
- Bill Summers – congas, percussion
