= Quartet (McCoy Tyner album) =

Live album by McCoy Tyner
- Released: September 11, 2007
- Recorded: December 30–31, 2006
- Venue: Yoshi's, Oakland, California
- Genre: Jazz
- Label: McCoy Tyner Music

McCoy Tyner chronology
Illuminations (2004)	Quartet (2007)	Guitars (2008)

Quartet is a live album by McCoy Tyner released on his McCoy Tyner Music label in 2007. It was recorded in December 2006 at Yoshi's in Oakland, California and features performances by Tyner with tenor saxophonist Joe Lovano, bassist Christian McBride, and drummer Jeff "Tain" Watts.

== Reception ==
Professional ratings
Review scores
Source	Rating
AllMusic	4/5 stars
The Penguin Guide to Jazz Recordings	4/4 stars

The AllMusic review by Michael G. Nastos states, "In many ways this is a remarkable date, a well-paced program with all the pieces (save "For All We Know") timed at around ten minutes, proof positive that Tyner's game is still very much on, and hovering at a very high level".

== Track listing ==
All compositions by McCoy Tyner except where indicated

1. "Walk Spirit, Talk Spirit" – 9:31
2. "Mellow Minor" – 9:51
3. "Sama Layuca" – 12:22
4. "Passion Dance" – 11:20
5. "Search for Peace" – 11:01
6. "Blues on the Corner" – 9:47
7. "For All We Know" (J. Fred Coots, Sam M. Lewis) – 3:04

== Personnel ==
- McCoy Tyner – piano
- Joe Lovano – tenor saxophone
- Christian McBride – double bass
- Jeff "Tain" Watts – drums
