= Guilherme Franco =

Guilherme Franco (November 25, 1946 – November 12, 2016, in São Paulo, Brazil) was a percussionist in the jazz and world fusion music genres.

Franco performed on the albums of many notable jazz musicians such as McCoy Tyner, Lonnie Liston Smith, Don Pullen and Woody Shaw. Between 1971 and 1976 he was an occasional additional member of Keith Jarrett's "American Quartet", and was also a member of Paul Winter's Consort.

In 1981 he started a samba school in New York City and a power samba group called "Pe De Boi" (a Brazilian slang term for a good musician, literally meaning "foot of the bull"). As a result, he began playing many gigs in the New York City underground scene of the 1980s with the likes of David Byrne and David Johansen among many others.

He was said to practice music 14 hours a day.

Franco suffered a stroke in March 2015 and was cared for at the Hospital Arnaldo Pezzuti Cavalcanti in Mogi das Cruzes, São Paulo where he died in November 2016.

== Discography ==
In 1998 he recorded the solo album Capoeira: Legendary Music of Brazil, on the Lyrichord record label, on which album he plays most of the instruments.

He appeared on at least one album a year in most years after 1972, as shown in the table below.

Year	Album	Artist	Instrument
1972	The Cry of My People	Archie Shepp	Percussion, Berimbau
1974	Atlantis	McCoy Tyner	Percussion
1974	Back Hand	Keith Jarrett	Percussion
1974	Black Love	Carlos Garnett	Percussion
1974	Bridge into the New Age	Azar Lawrence	Percussion
1974	The Moontrane	Woody Shaw	Percussion
1974	Sama Layuca	McCoy Tyner	Percussion
1974	Treasure Island	Keith Jarrett	Percussion
1975	Death and the Flower	Keith Jarrett	Percussion
1975	New Agenda	Elvin Jones	Percussion
1975	Love Dance	Woody Shaw	Percussion
1975	Mysteries	Keith Jarrett	Percussion
1975	Pinnacle	Buster Williams	Percussion
1975	Shades	Keith Jarrett	Percussion
1975	Speak to Loneliness	Terumasa Hino	Percussion
1975	Summer Solstice	Azar Lawrence	Drums
1976	Fly with the Wind	McCoy Tyner	Tambourine
1976	Ichi-Ban	Louis Hayes-Junior Cook Quintet	Percussion
1976	Focal Point	McCoy Tyner	Percussion, conga, Tabla
1976	Reflections of a Golden Dream	Lonnie Liston Smith	Percussion
1977	Mysterious Flying Orchestra	Bob Thiele	Percussion
1977	Renaissance	Lonnie Liston Smith	Percussion
1978	The Greeting	McCoy Tyner	Percussion, Conga, Berimbau
1978	Lenox Avenue Breakdown	Arthur Blythe	Percussion
1978	Live at Carnegie Hall & Montreaux, Switzerland	Teresa Brewer	Percussion, Latin American Rhythm
1978	Thundering	David Schnitter	Percussion, Conga, Vocals
1979	Wintersong	Paul Winter Consort	Flute, Drums, Snare drum
1980	Swish	Michael Brecker/Harris Simon Group	Percussion
1981	Para Los Amigos!!	Gato Barbieri	Percussion
1982	Missa Gaia/Earth Mass	Paul Winter	Percussion
1985	Concert for the Earth	Paul Winter Consort with Susan Osborn	Percussion
1987	Balance	C'est What?!	Berimbau, Cuica
1987	Oscar!	Oscar Castro-Neves	Percussion
1988	Wolf Eyes	Paul Winter Consort	Percussion
1990	Earth: Voices of a Planet	Paul Winter Consort	Drums, Surdo, Agogo
1990	So & So: Mukai Meets Gilberto	Astrud Gilberto with S. Mukai	Percussion, Berimbau, Shaker
1991	Children of Ibeji	Ivo Perelman	Percussion, Drums, Vocals, Electric Berimbau
1991	Kele Mou Bana	Don Pullen	Percussion, Timbales, Berimbau, Timba
1991	Live from El Salvador	Various Artists	Drums
1991	Watercolors	Lonnie Liston Smith	Percussion
1992	Anthems	Paul Winter	Percussion
1992	Lunasea	Lee Konitz with Peggy Stern	Percussion
1992	Passing Thoughts	Tana/Reid	Percussion, Conga
1992	Sun Sun	Casiopea	Percussion
1992	Children Of Ibeji	Ivo Perelman	Percussion, drums, electric berimbau
1993	Be Bop or Be Dead	Umar Bin Hassan	Percussion, Conga, Berimbau
1993	Caminhos Cruzados	Larry Goldings	Tabla, Pandeiro, Agogo, Cuica, Ganza, Tamborim
1993	Ekstasis	Nicky Skopelitis	Percussion, Conga, Sound Effects, Tambourine, Whistling, Whistle, Berimbau, Cuica, cowbell
1993	Ode to Life	Don Pullen & The African-Brazilian Conne	Percussion, Berimbau, Timba
1993	Still Waters	C'est What?!	Drums, Berimbau, Cuica
1994	Man of the Forest	Ivo Perelman	Conga, Timbales, Bells, Pandeiro, Pandora, Cuica, Zabumba, Timba
1994	Dance of the Forest	Rain Straight Ahead	Percussion, Conga
1996	Big Stuff	Larry Goldings	Percussion
1996	Thank You, John! Our Tribute to John Coltrane	Arkadia Jazz All-Stars	Drums
1996	Traveling On	Ted Curson	Percussion
1997	Dark Journey	Woody Shaw	Percussion
1997	Last of the Line	Woody Shaw	Percussion
1998	Capoeira: Legendary Music of Brazil	Guilherme Franco	Conga, Triangle, Vocals, Berimbau, Pandeiro, Surdo, Performer, Agogo, Cuica, Ganza, Quinto, Soprano Berimbau, Tenor Berimbau
1998	Power Samba Band	Pe de Boi	Percussion, Arranger, Vocals, Producer
1999	Another Blue	T.K. Blue	Percussion
1999	Apparition	John McKenna	Percussion
1999	Brazilian Watercolor	Ivo Perelman	Percussion, Wood Flute
1999	Down Here Below	Jeffery Smith	Percussion, Drums
1999	Future Jazz	Howard Mandel	Percussion, Timba
1999	Three Flutes Up	Chip Shelton	Percussion
2000	Givin' Away the Store, Vol. 2	Woody Shaw	Percussion
2000	Ichi-Ban	Louis Hayes	Percussion
2000	Incontournables	McCoy Tyner	Percussion
2000	New Mo Swing: The Ancient and Modern Moabites, Vol. 1	Napoleon Revels-Bey	Percussion
2001	Easy Living: Jazz Bossa	Various Artists	Percussion
2001	Essential Thiago De Mello	Thiago De Mello	Percussion
2001	It's About Love	Various Artists	Percussion
2003	Flying Funk	Various Artists	Percussion
2003	Plant the Seed	Plant the Seed	Percussion
2004	It Doesn't Matter	Lou Watson	Percussion
2005	African Spirits: A Spiritual Jazz Journey Looking Bac	Various Artists	Percussion
2005	Hit the Rhodes, Jack	Various Artists	Percussion
2006	Fort Yawuh/Death and the Flower	Keith Jarrett	Percussion
2006	House That Trane Built: Story of Impulse Records	Various Artists	Percussion
2006	Impulse Story	Keith Jarrett	Percussion
2006	Milestone Profiles	McCoy Tyner	Percussion
2006	O Nosso Amor	Mark Weinstein	Percussion
