= Sama Layuca =

Studio album by McCoy Tyner
- Released: 1974
- Recorded: March 26–28, 1974
- Genre: Modal jazz
- Length: 43:29
- Label: Milestone
- Producer: Orrin Keepnews

McCoy Tyner chronology
Enlightenment (1973)	Sama Layuca (1974)	Atlantis (1974)

Professional ratings
Review scores
Source	Rating
AllMusic	4.5/5 stars
Christgau's Record Guide	B+
The Rolling Stone Jazz Record Guide	4/5 stars

Sama Layuca is a studio album by American jazz pianist McCoy Tyner, released in 1974 by Milestone Records. It was recorded on March 26, 27, and 28, 1974, featuring oboist/flautist John Stubblefield, alto saxophonist Gary Bartz, tenor saxophonist Azar Lawrence, vibraphonist Bobby Hutcherson, bassist Buster Williams, drummer Billy Hart and percussionists Guilherme Franco and James Mtume.

== Critical reception ==
Reviewing for The Village Voice in 1974, Robert Christgau said the album's best music "breathes with a lushness and lyricism that never cloys". He found the melodies, harmonies, and polyrhythms to be "sensuous without coming on about it" and felt that Tyner's minor flaws as a pianist, including "Tatumesque flourishes", are "less egregious in an ensemble setting like this one." In a retrospective review for AllMusic, Scott Yanow said that Tyner is "heard at the height of his powers throughout this rewarding set", which serves as "a strong example of McCoy Tyner's music".

== Track listing ==
All songs composed by McCoy Tyner.

1. "Sama Layuca" - 8:37
2. "Above the Rainbow" - 3:02
3. "La Cubaña" - 10:26
4. "Desert Cry" - 4:57
5. "Paradox" - 16:27

== Personnel ==
- McCoy Tyner - piano
- John Stubblefield - oboe, flute
- Gary Bartz - alto saxophone
- Azar Lawrence - tenor saxophone, soprano saxophone
- Bobby Hutcherson - vibes, marimba
- Buster Williams - bass
- Billy Hart - drums
- Guilherme Franco - percussion
- James Mtume - percussion
