= Half Note Records =

- Founded: 1998
- Founder: Blue Note Jazz Club
- Genre: Jazz
- Country of origin: U.S.
- Location: New York City

Half Note Records is a jazz record label founded by the Blue Note Jazz Club in 1998. Although it began releasing live recordings from the club, the label expanded to produce studio albums.

Half Note has received critical acclaim for many of its releases. Paquito D'Rivera's album Live at the Blue Note won a Latin Grammy Award for Best Latin Jazz Album in 2001. Several other releases have received Grammy nominations, including Gil Goldstein's Under Rousseau's Moon; Conrad Herwig's The Latin Side of Wayne Shorter and Another Kind of Blue: The Latin Side of Miles Davis; and the Omar Sosa Sextet's Across the Divide: A Tale of Rhythm & Ancestry.

Half Note has released albums by Will Calhoun, James Carter, Avishai Cohen, the Dizzy Gillespie All-Star Big Band, Donald Harrison, Elvin Jones, John Medeski, Francisco Mela, Brian Lynch, Odean Pope, Arturo Sandoval, Omar Sosa, Mary Stallings, Grady Tate, Charles Tolliver, McCoy Tyner, Tony Vacca, Roseanna Vitro, Jeff "Tain" Watts, and Kenny Werner.

== Partial discography ==
- 4516: Kenny Werner Trio – Peace (3/16/2004)
- 4517: Conrad Herwig Nonet – Another Kind of Blue: The Latin Side of Miles Davis (3/16/2004)
- 4518: Jeff "Tain" Watts Quintet – Detained at the Blue Note (9/14/2004)
- 4519: Elvin Jones Jazz Machine – The Truth: Heard Live at the Blue Note (10/12/2004)
- 4520: James Carter Organ Trio – Out of Nowhere (6/28/2005)
- 4521: Mary Stallings – Remember Love (5/24/2005)
- 4522: Arturo Sandoval – Live at the Blue Note (CD/DVD) (5/24/2004)
- 4523: Arturo Sandoval – Live at the Blue Note (DVD) (5/24/2004)
- 4524: Will Calhoun – Native Lands (6/28/2005)
- 4525: Donald Harrison – New York Cool (6/25/2005)
- 4526: Odean Pope Saxophone Choir – Locked & Loaded (3/14/2006)
- 4527: Gil Goldstein – Under Rousseau's Moon (8/29/2006)
- 4528: Kenny Werner – Democracy (8/29/2006)
- 4529: Grady Tate – From the Heart: Songs Sung Live at the Blue Note (10/7/2006)
- 4530: Conrad Herwig & Brian Lynch – Sketches of Spain y Mas: The Latin Side of Miles Davis (10/7/2006)
- 4531: Avishai Cohen – As Is...Live at the Blue Note (CD/DVD) (4/24/2007)
- 4532: Avishai Cohen – As Is...Live at the Blue Note (DVD) (4/24/2007)
- 4533: McCoy Tyner – Quartet (9/11/2007)
- 4534: Kenny Werner & Roseanna Vitro – The Delirium Blues Project (3/25/2008)
- 4535: Conrad Herwig – The Latin Side of Wayne Shorter (5/20/2008)
- 4536: Francisco Mela – Cirio (9/23/2008)
- 4537: McCoy Tyner – Guitars (9/23/2008)
- 4538: Omar Sosa Sextet – Across the Divide: A Tale of Rhythm & Ancestry (3/24/2009)
- 4539: Charles Tolliver Big Band – Emperor March: Live at the Blue Note (3/24/2009)
- 4540: Dizzy Gillespie All–Star Big Band – I'm BeBoppin' Too (6/30/2009)
- 4541: McCoy Tyner – Solo: Live from San Francisco (8/25/2009)
- 4542: James Carter & John Medeski – Heaven on Earth (8/25/2009)
- 4543: Kenny Werner – No Beginning, No End (8/17/2010)
- 4544: Conrad Herwig – The Latin Side of Herbie Hancock (8/17/2010)
- 4546: Kenny Werner – Balloons (3/15/2011)
- 4548: Kenny Werner and the Brussels Jazz Orchestra – Institute of Higher Learning (12-7-8/2010)
- 4549: Francisco Mela & Cuban Safari – Tree of Life
- 4550: Donald Harrison – This Is Jazz
- 4551: Maya Azucena – Cry Love
- 4552: Lee Konitz, Bill Frisell, Gary Peacock and Joey Baron – Enfants Terribles
