= Canyon Lady =

Studio album by Joe Henderson
- Released: May 1975
- Recorded: October 1–3, 1973
- Studio: Fantasy Studios, Berkeley
- Genre: Post-bop, world fusion, jazz fusion
- Length: 37:53
- Label: Milestone; MSP 9057
- Producer: Orrin Keepnews

Joe Henderson chronology
| The Elements (1973) | Canyon Lady (1975) | Black Miracle (1976) |

Professional ratings
Review scores
| Source | Rating |
|---|---|
| AllMusic | 3/5 stars |
| The Penguin Guide to Jazz Recordings | 2.5/4 stars |
| The Rolling Stone Jazz Record Guide | 2/5 stars |
| The Village Voice | C+ |

Canyon Lady is a jazz album by Joe Henderson. It was recorded in 1973, but not released until 1975. It is an unusual album, one of Henderson's most experimental efforts. Far from being a standard jazz project, Canyon Lady incorporates very strong Latin American influences in the brass arrangements and rhythm section playing. Henderson's work is characterized by intense ostinato patterns. The first two pieces also feature creative electric piano solos by George Duke. The many musicians involved in the project include trombonist Julian Priester, bassist John Heard, drummer Eric Gravatt, a brass section and percussionists.

== Track listing ==
1. "Tres Palabras" (Osvaldo Farres) – 10:11
2. "Las Palmas" (Joe Henderson) – 9:58
3. "Canyon Lady" (Mark Levine) – 9:07
4. "All Things Considered" (Mark Levine) – 8:37

Recorded on October 1 (#1), 2 (#4) and October 3 (#2–3), 1973.

== Personnel ==
- Joe Henderson – tenor saxophone
- Mark Levine – acoustic piano
- John Heard – double bass
- Eric Gravatt – drums
- Carmelo Garcia – timbales
- Victor Pantoja – congas
- Julian Priester – trombone (1, 3, 4)
- Luis Gasca – trumpet (2, 3, 4), flugelhorn (3, 4)
- George Duke – electric piano (1, 2, 3)
- Oscar Brashear – trumpet (1, 3, 4)
- John Hunt – trumpet (1)
- Hadley Caliman – flute (1), tenor saxophone (3)
- Ray Pizzi – flute (1)
- Vincent Denham – flute (1)
- Nicholas Tenbroek – trombone (1)
- Francisco Aguabella – congas (4)

=== Additional personnel ===
- Tony Lane – cover photography
- Jim Stern – recording engineer
