= Land of Giants =

Studio album by McCoy Tyner, Bobby Hutcherson, Charnett Moffett and Eric Harland
- Released: June 24, 2003
- Recorded: December 10–11, 2002
- Studio: Avatar, New York City
- Genre: Jazz
- Length: 65:30
- Label: Telarc

McCoy Tyner chronology
Jazz Roots (2000)	Land of Giants (2003)	Illuminations (2004)

Bobby Hutcherson chronology
Skyline (1999)	Land of Giants (2003)	For Sentimental Reasons (2007)

Professional ratings
Review scores
Source	Rating
Allmusic	4/5 stars
The Penguin Guide to Jazz Recordings	3.5/4 stars

Land of Giants is an album by McCoy Tyner released on the Telarc label in 2003. It was recorded in December 2002 and features performances of Tyner with vibraphonist Bobby Hutcherson, bassist Charnett Moffett and drummer Eric Harland. The Allmusic review by Matt Collar states that "While the work here is by no means as provocative as the stuff Hutcherson and Tyner produced in their heydays, it nonetheless proves them to be utter masters of the straight-ahead modern jazz idiom and should appeal to longtime fans".

== Track listing ==
1. "Serra Do Mar" - 6:34
2. "December" - 4:47
3. "Steppin'" - 4:48
4. "If I Were a Bell" (Loesser) - 7:50
5. "Manalyuca" - 7:20
6. "Back Bay Blues" - 6:11
7. "For All We Know" (Coots, Lewis) - 4:33
8. "The Search" - 5:47
9. "Contemplation" - 6:13
10. "In a Mellow Tone" (Ellington, Gabler) - 6:17

All compositions by McCoy Tyner except as indicated

== Personnel ==
- McCoy Tyner - piano
- Bobby Hutcherson - vibes
- Charnett Moffett - bass
- Eric Harland - drums
