= Linda Sikhakhane =

South African saxophonist and composer (born 1992)

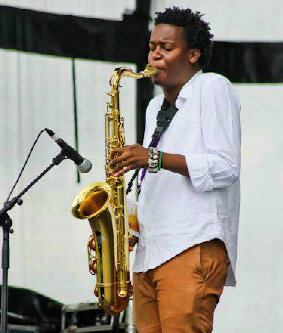

Background information
- Born: Linda Sikhakhane; 14 June 1992 (age 33); Umlazi, Durban, South Africa
- Occupations: Composer; saxophonist
- Instrument: Saxophone
- Years active: 2000–present
- Website: lindasikhakhane.com

Linda Sikhakhane (born 14 June 1992) is a South African saxophonist and composer born in Umlazi, Durban. His love for music, especially Jazz, was triggered at an early age and this saw him attending music classes under the tutelage of Dr Brian Thusi and Mr Khulekani Bhengu. He then enrolled to study Music at the University of KwaZulu-Natal (UKZN). Sikhakhane has played with many respected South African artists and also shared the stage with many international artists. He has also been involved in many projects as a mentor and teacher of music to young pupils. While still at UKZN his talent also saw him being offered bursaries from SAMRO, the National Arts Council and the Leeds Youth Big Band.
