= Illuminations (McCoy Tyner album) =

Studio album by McCoy Tyner
- Released: June 22, 2004
- Recorded: November 18–19, 2003
- Studios: Avatar, New York, New York
- Genre: Jazz
- Label: Telarc

McCoy Tyner chronology
Land of Giants (2003)	Illuminations (2004)	Quartet (2007)

Professional ratings
Review scores
Source	Rating
Allmusic	4/5 stars
The Penguin Guide to Jazz Recordings	3/4 stars

Illuminations is a piano album by McCoy Tyner released on the Telarc label in 2004. It was recorded in November 2003 and features performance by Tyner with alto saxophonist Gary Bartz, trumpeter Terence Blanchard, bassist Christian McBride, and drummer Lewis Nash.

== Reception ==
It won the Grammy Award for 'Best Instrumental Jazz Album, Individual or Group' in 2005. The Allmusic review by Ken Dryden states that "This is yet another essential release by the always enjoyable McCoy Tyner".

== Track listing ==
All compositions by McCoy Tyner except where noted.

1. "Illuminations" – 6:12
2. "Angelina" – 8:50
3. "New Orleans Stomp" – 5:58
4. "Come Rain or Come Shine" (Arlen) – 5:35
5. "Soulstice" (Bartz) – 5:24
6. "Blessings" (Blanchard) – 4:52
7. "If I Should Lose You" (Rainger, Robin) – 6:27
8. "The Chase" – 3:17
9. "West Philly Tone Poem" (McBride) – 4:01
10. "Alone Together" (Schwartz) – 7:10

== Personnel ==
- McCoy Tyner – piano
- Terence Blanchard – trumpet
- Gary Bartz – alto saxophone
- Christian McBride – bass
- Lewis Nash – drums
