= Guitars (McCoy Tyner album) =

Studio album by McCoy Tyner
- Released: September 23, 2008
- Recorded: September 7 & 25, 2006
- Studio: Clinton Studios, New York
- Genre: Jazz
- Label: McCoy Tyner Music

McCoy Tyner chronology
Quartet (2007)	Guitars (2008)	Solo: Live from San Francisco (2009)

Guitars is an album by McCoy Tyner released on his McCoy Tyner Music (a subsidiary of Half Note Records) label in 2008. It was recorded in September 2006 and features performances by Tyner, bassist Ron Carter and drummer Jack DeJohnette, along with electric guitarists Marc Ribot, John Scofield, Derek Trucks and Bill Frisell and banjo player Bela Fleck guesting on multiple tracks. The album package also contains a DVD featuring video footage of the studio sessions. It was Tyner's final studio album.

== Reception ==
Professional ratings
Review scores
Source	Rating
AllMusic	3.5/5 stars

AllMusic critic Michael G. Nastos described the album as "an interesting slice in time, but not a definitive recording in Tyner's legendary and lengthy musical career".

== Track listing ==
All compositions by McCoy Tyner except were indicated

1. "Improvisation 2" (Marc Ribot, Tyner) – 1:34
2. "Passion Dance" – 6:10
3. "500 Miles" (Traditional) – 6:22
4. "Mr. P.C." (John Coltrane) – 6:21
5. "Blues on the Corner" – 6:07
6. "Improvisation 1" (Ribot, Tyner) – 3:46
7. "Trade Winds" (Bela Fleck) – 6:35
8. "Amberjack" (Fleck) – 4:36
9. "My Favorite Things" (Oscar Hammerstein II, Richard Rodgers) – 7:01
10. "Slapback Blues" – 3:46
11. "Greensleeves" (Traditional) – 6:15
12. "Contemplation" – 7:55
13. "Boubacar" (Bill Frisell) – 2:18
14. "Baba Drame" (Boubacar Traoré) – 5:21

== Personnel ==
- McCoy Tyner – piano
- Bill Frisell – guitar (tracks 12, 13 & 14)
- Marc Ribot – guitar (tracks 1, 2, 3 & 6)
- John Scofield – guitar (tracks 4 & 5)
- Derek Trucks – guitar (tracks 10 & 11)
- Béla Fleck – banjo (tracks 7, 8 & 9)
- Ron Carter – double bass
- Jack DeJohnette – drums
