= McCoy Tyner with Stanley Clarke and Al Foster =

Studio album by McCoy Tyner
- Released: January 25, 2000
- Recorded: April 27 & 28, 1999
- Genre: Jazz
- Length: 65:30
- Label: Telarc

McCoy Tyner chronology
McCoy Tyner and the Latin All-Stars (1999)	McCoy Tyner with Stanley Clarke and Al Foster (2000)	Jazz Roots (2000)

Professional ratings
Review scores
Source	Rating
Allmusic	3/5 stars
The Penguin Guide to Jazz Recordings	3.5/4 stars

McCoy Tyner with Stanley Clarke and Al Foster is an album by McCoy Tyner released on the Telarc label in 2000. It was recorded in April 1999 and features performances of by Tyner with bassist Stanley Clarke and drummer Al Foster. The Allmusic review by Richard S. Ginell states that "This is Tyner reaffirming most of his strengths: the massive tone quality, the two-handed control over the entire keyboard, and the generally uplifting attitude conveyed through the shape of his melodic invention".

== Track listing ==
1. "Trane-Like" - 9:12
2. "Once Upon a Time" - 5:31
3. "Never Let Me Go" (Ray Evans, Jay Livingston) - 4:19
4. "I Want to Tell You 'Bout That" - 5:19
5. "Will You Still Be Mine?" (Tom Adair, Matt Dennis) - 6:46
6. "Goin' 'Way Blues" - 6:31
7. "In the Tradition Of" (Clarke) - 7:38
8. "The Night has a Thousand Eyes" (Buddy Bernier, Jerry Brainin) - 4:53
9. "Carriba" - 5:41
10. "Memories" - 3:43
11. "I Want to Tell You 'Bout That" [alternate take] - 5:57

All compositions by McCoy Tyner except as indicated
- Recorded at Clinton Recording Studio "B", New York, New York on April 27 & 28, 1999

== Personnel ==
- McCoy Tyner - piano
- Stanley Clarke - bass, electric bass
- Al Foster - drums
