= Jazz Roots =

Studio album by McCoy Tyner
- Released: October 24, 2000
- Recorded: June 13–14, 2000
- Genre: Jazz
- Label: Telarc

McCoy Tyner chronology
| McCoy Tyner with Stanley Clarke and Al Foster (2000) | Jazz Roots (2000) | Land of Giants (2003) |

Professional ratings
Review scores
| Source | Rating |
|---|---|
| Allmusic | 4/5 stars |
| The Penguin Guide to Jazz Recordings | 3.5/4 stars |

Jazz Roots: McCoy Tyner Honors Jazz Piano Legends of the 20th Century is a solo piano album by McCoy Tyner released on the Telarc label in 2000. Tyner said of the recording, "I just wanted to pay homage to my predecessors who made it all possible and to those who are continuing the solo tradition."

== Reception ==
The AllMusic review by Paula Edelstein states, "The songs and artists McCoy Tyner has selected to pay tribute to are all great examples of his excellent ability to blend these various sources of inspiration and his compositional integrity into a coherent, persuasive whole. Nowhere is this clearer or more meaningful than on [this album]."

== Track listing ==
1. "A Night in Tunisia" (Gillespie) - 2:54 (dedicated to Bud Powell)
2. "Pannonica" (Monk) - 3:37
3. "My Foolish Heart" (Young) - 4:20 (dedicated to Bill Evans)
4. "Don't Get Around Much Anymore" (Ellington, Russell) - 4:26
5. "Blues for Fatha" - 4:00 (dedicated to Earl Hines)
6. "Sweet and Lovely" (Arnheim, LeMare, Tobias) - 4:06 (dedicated to Art Tatum)
7. "Lullaby of Birdland" (Shearing, Weiss) - 3:35
8. "You Taught My Heart to Sing" (Cahn, Tyner) - 5:40
9. "Happy Days" - 5:50 (dedicated to Keith Jarrett)
10. "Rio" - 4:57 (dedicated to Chick Corea)
11. "Summertime" (Gershwin, Gershwin, Heyward) - 4:51
12. "St. Louis Blues" (Handy) - 3:39
13. "Ain't Misbehavin'" (Brooks, Razaf, Waller) - 3:41
14. "Misty" (Burke, Garner) - 3:06

All compositions by McCoy Tyner except as indicated
- Recorded at Ambient Recording Studio, Stamford, Connecticut on June 13 & 14, 2000

== Personnel ==
- McCoy Tyner - piano
