= McCoy Tyner and the Latin All-Stars =

Studio album by McCoy Tyner
- Released: March 23, 1999
- Recorded: July 29–30, 1998
- Genre: Jazz
- Length: 61:27
- Label: Telarc

McCoy Tyner chronology
Plays John Coltrane (1998)	McCoy Tyner and the Latin All-Stars (1999)	McCoy Tyner with Stanley Clarke and Al Foster (1998)

McCoy Tyner and the Latin All-Stars is an album by McCoy Tyner, released on the Telarc label in 1999. It was recorded in July 1998 and contains performances by Tyner with alto saxophonist Gary Bartz, trumpeter Claudio Roditi, flautist Dave Valentin, bassist Avery Sharpe, drummer Ignacio Berroa and percussionists Johnny Almendra and Giovanni Hidalgo.

== Reception ==
Professional ratings
Review scores
Source	Rating
AllMusic	4/5 stars
The Penguin Guide to Jazz Recordings	3.5/4 stars

The AllMusic review by Jim Newsom states that "McCoy Tyner's percussive piano style has always worked well within an Afro-Cuban groove, and this recording provides an excellent setting for him and his all-star lineup to work in".

== Track listing ==
All compositions by McCoy Tyner except as indicated

1. "Festival in Bahia" - 10:58
2. "Poinciana" (Simon), Bernier) - 6:55
3. "Afro Blue" (Santamaría) - 12:19
4. "A Song for Love" - 10:30
5. "La Habana Sol" - 8:33
6. "We Are Our Fathers' Sons" (Sharpe) - 5:21
7. "Blue Bossa" (Dorham) - 6:51

- Recorded at Avatar Studios, Studio A, New York City, July 29 & 30, 1998

== Personnel ==
- McCoy Tyner - piano
- Gary Bartz - saxophones
- Claudio Roditi - trumpet, flugelhorn
- Steve Turre - trombone
- Dave Valentin - flute
- Avery Sharpe - bass
- Ignacio Berroa - drums
- Johnny Almendra - timbales
- Giovanni Hidalgo - congas & percussion
