= Sherab Sangpo =

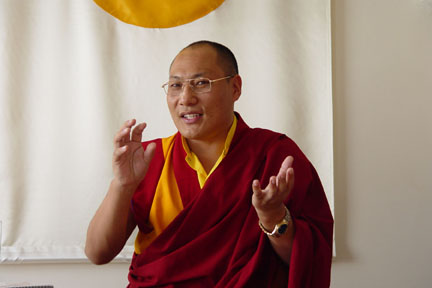
Khenpo Sherab Sangpo teaching at the Minneapolis Shambhala Center

Sherab Sangpo (Wylie: mkhan po shes rab bzang po) (Tibetan: མཁན་པོ་ཤེས་རབ་བཟང་པོ)

Sherab Sangpo is the Spiritual Director of Bodhicitta Sangha | Heart of Enlightenment Institute in Minneapolis, Minnesota, USA. He was trained by Khenpo Petse Rinpoche and Jigme Phuntsok Rinpoche, two masters of the Nyingma tradition. He was invited to teach at Chökyi Nyima Rinpoche's Ka-Nying Shedrup Ling monastery, where he gave lectures to both Tibetan monks and Western students at the Centre for Buddhist Studies.

== Biography ==
Khenpo (tib. literally "wise one") is the spiritual adviser of the Bodhicitta Sangha. He was first invited to Minnesota to teach under the auspices of the Rimé Foundation

Sangpo began his studies in Tibet with Petsé Rinpoche, with whom he studied for over twenty years. He became a monk at the age of seven at Gyalwa Phukhang Monastery, a branch of Dilgo Khyentse Rinpoche’s Sechen Monastery. Under Rinpoche's guidance, he first studied Tibetan Buddhist ritual, eventually becoming one of the monastery's ritual leaders and chant masters. Even at a young age, he was renowned for his ability to memorize the vast number of texts used at the monastery and his command of Tibetan Buddhist ritual.

Rinpoche enrolled his student in the monastery’s monastic college, Ngedon Shedrup Targye Ling, when he was thirteen years old. For years, the only task his master gave him was to memorize the countless texts that form the core of the Buddhist education system. Only once he had memorized them all and could recite them from memory did he go on to receive teachings on their meaning. Rinpoche often taught day after day for months on end, without taking a day off. He also taught the monks himself. Sangpo studied for years in this manner, receiving teachings on the range of Buddhist philosophy and practice.

Sangpo is known for his knowledge of Madhyamaka philosophy, the writings of Rimé master Ju Mipham Rinpoche and Buddhist Tantra. Concerning the latter, his expertise comes not only from his knowledge of the Tantric scriptures, but also through his mastery of monastic ritual and the years he has spent meditating in retreat. Rinpoche also gave him extensive teachings on the so-called “five sciences.” which include astrology, poetry, medicine and grammar.Sangpo is renowned for his knowledge of these topics.

Sangpo traveled to Larung Gar Monastery in a remote area in North-Eastern Tibet to study under the lama Jigme Phuntsok Rinpoche. He spent six years with this master furthering his studies, at the end of which his abilities as a teacher were again recognized formally by the monastery and his teachers. He also received rare teachings, such as The Treasury of Precious Revelations (Rinchen Terdzöd), from great Rimé masters like Dilgo Khyentsé Rinpoche and Trulshik Rinpoche, both of whom are root gurus of Tenzin Gyatso the Dalai Lama.

Following his time in Larung Gar, he returned to his home monastery. Shortly thereafter, Rinpoche gave him a letter of introduction and sent him alone to receive teachings from meditation hermit Adzom Druktrul Rinpoche. Sangpo received the entire “hearing lineage” of the Dzogchen teachings from one of the greatest masters in Tibet. At the end of this period, Adzom Drukpa Rinpoche recognized that his student had truly mastered the teachings. He then commanded Sangpo to uphold all the Buddha’s teachings, formally empowering him to teach all aspects of sutra and tantra, give empowerments, and work for the benefit of others using whatever methods are appropriate. This great honor is a testament to the fact that the Khenpo has mastered not only the theory of Buddhist philosophy and practice, but has also had direct experiential realization of the teachings as well.

In the late 1990s, Chokyi Nyima Rinpoche requested Rinpoche to send his most learned and accomplished khenpo to teach at his monastery in Kathmandu. Rinpoche responded by sending Sangpo, who then spent four years teaching both Western students and Tibetan monks at Ka-Nying Shedrub Ling Monastery, one of the largest monasteries outside Tibet. During this time, he gave numerous teachings at the Center for Buddhist Studies and Ka-Nying Shedrub Ling Monastery, including Mipham’s commentaries on Nagarjuna’s Fundamental Knowledge of the Middle Way, Chandrakirti’s Entrance to the Middle Way, Shantarakshita’s Ornament of the Middle Way, and Longchenpa’s Dispelling the Darkness of the Ten Directions, a Commentary on the Guhyagarbha Tantra.
