= McCoy Tyner =

American jazz pianist (1938–2020)

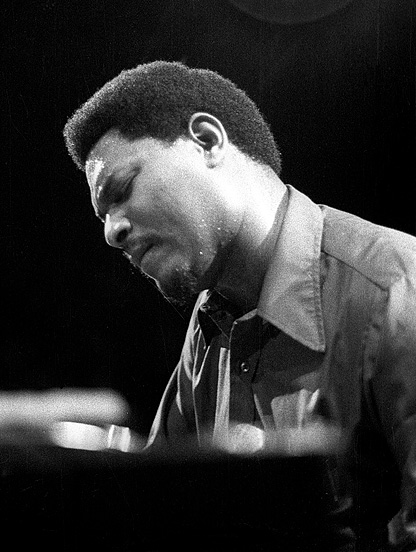
- Tyner in 1973

Background information
- Born: Alfred McCoy Tyner; December 11, 1938; Philadelphia, Pennsylvania, U.S.
- Died: March 6, 2020 (aged 81) Bergenfield, New Jersey, U.S.
- Genres: Jazz; hard bop; post-bop; modal jazz; avant-garde jazz
- Occupations: Musician; composer
- Instrument: Piano
- Years active: 1960–2020
- Labels: Impulse!; Blue Note; Milestone; Telarc; McCoy Tyner Music
- Formerly of: The Jazztet
- Spouse: Aisha Saud (divorced)
- Website: mccoytyner.com
- Relatives: Jarvis Tyner (brother)

Alfred McCoy Tyner (December 11, 1938 – March 6, 2020) was an American jazz pianist and composer known for his work with the John Coltrane Quartet from 1960 to 1965 and his long solo career afterward. He was an NEA Jazz Master and a five-time Grammy Award winner. Tyner has been widely imitated and is one of the most recognizable and influential jazz pianists of all time.

== Early life and education ==
Tyner was born on December 11, 1938, in Philadelphia, Pennsylvania, United States, the eldest of Jarvis and Beatrice (née Stevenson) Tyner's three children.

Tyner was encouraged to study piano by his mother, who had installed a piano at her beauty salon. At the age of 13, he began piano lessons at the Granoff School of Music, where he also studied music theory and harmony. By the time he was 15 years old, music had become the center of his life.

Tyner's decision to study piano was reinforced when he encountered bebop pianist Bud Powell, a neighbor of the Tyner family. Another major influence on Tyner's playing was Thelonious Monk, whose percussive attacks informed Tyner's style. During his teens, Tyner led his own group, the Houserockers.

When he was 17, Tyner converted to Ahmadiyya and changed his name to Suleiman Saud, although he continued to perform as "McCoy Tyner".

== Early career and the John Coltrane Quartet ==
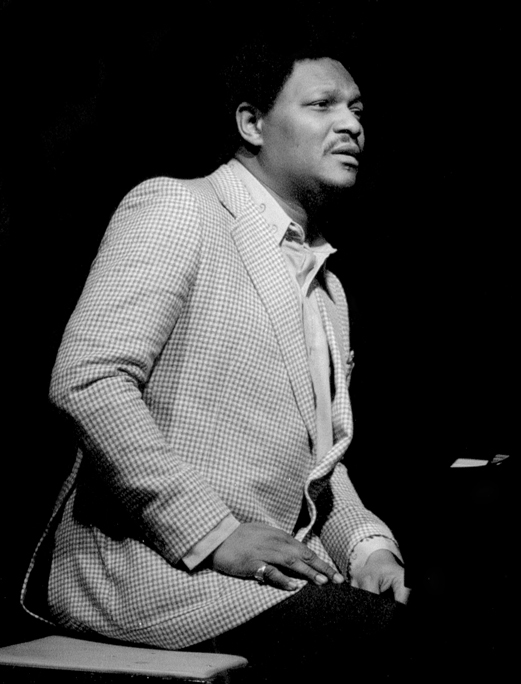
Tyner at Keystone Korner in San Francisco, in March 1981

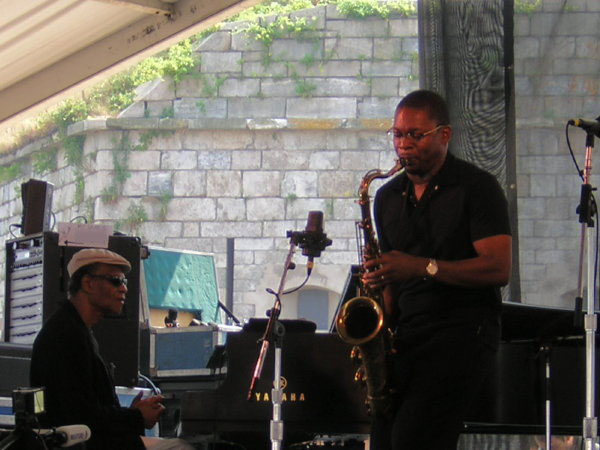
Tyner with Ravi Coltrane at the Newport Jazz Festival in Newport, Rhode Island, in August 2005

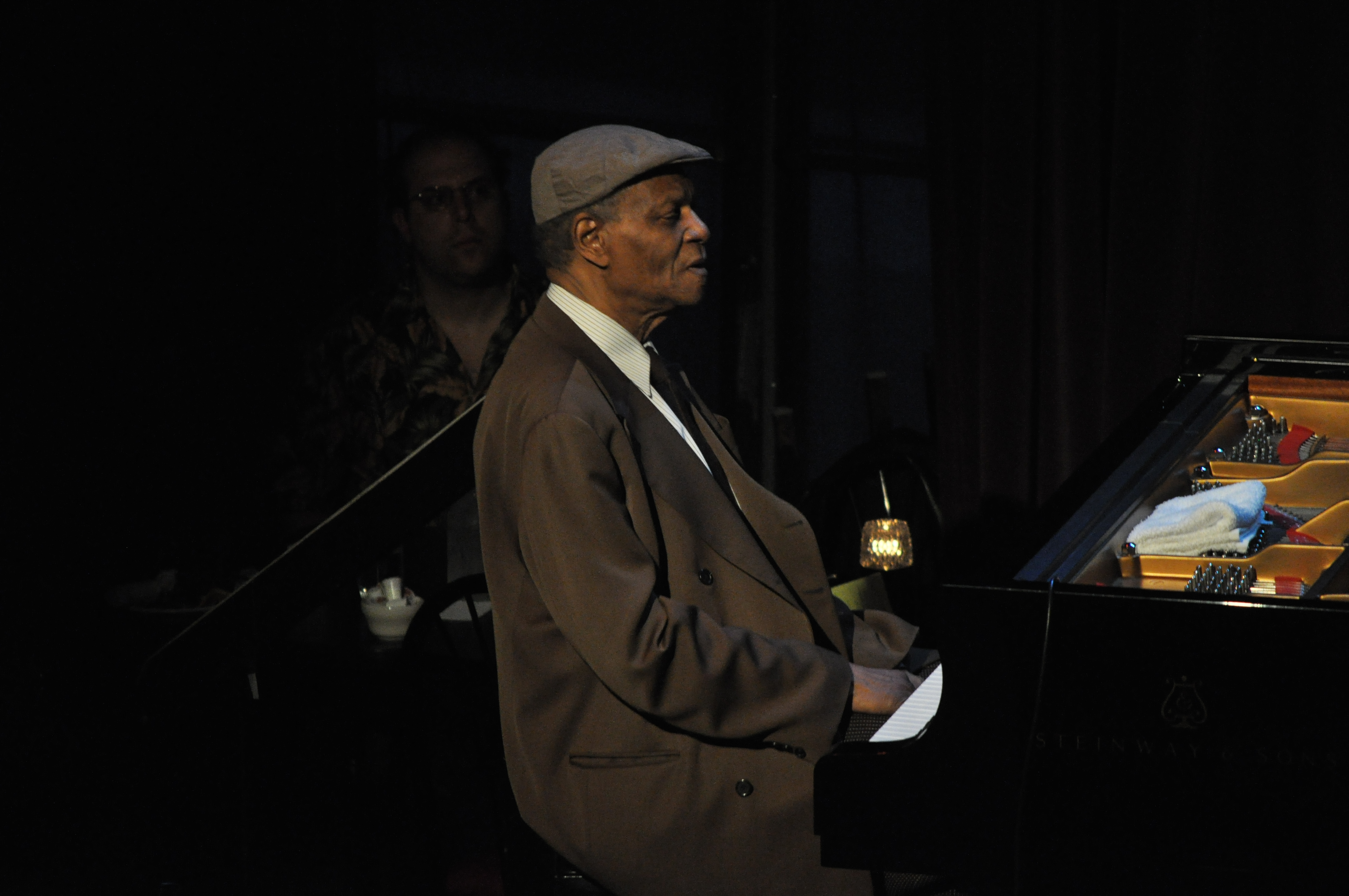
Tyner with his quartet at Jazz Alley in Seattle, in April 2012

Tyner began playing professionally in Philadelphia with local artists such as Lee Morgan and Jimmy Heath, participating in the city's modern jazz scene. He first met John Coltrane, who eventually became "like a big brother" to Tyner, in the summer of 1955. They kept in touch, played together occasionally, and had an understanding that if Coltrane ever formed a group of his own, Tyner would be the pianist. In 1960, Tyner joined The Jazztet led by Benny Golson and Art Farmer and recorded on the group's debut album, Meet the Jazztet. Around the same time, Coltrane left Miles Davis's group and formed a quartet of his own, but because he was friends with Golson, he was reluctant to ask Tyner to leave The Jazztet. Encouraged by his wife, Naima, Coltrane eventually asked Tyner what he wanted to do.

After six months with The Jazztet, Tyner joined the John Coltrane Quartet, which then included bassist Steve Davis and drummer Elvin Jones. Tyner worked with the band during its extended run at the Jazz Gallery, replacing Steve Kuhn. Reflecting on the situation later, Tyner said: "There were probably some bad feelings at first with the Jazztet, but I think they understood better later on. John's group was where I belonged." Coltrane had already recorded Tyner's composition "The Believer" on January 10, 1958, which became the title track of Prestige Records' 1964 album under Coltrane's name.

The band toured almost nonstop between 1961 and 1965 and went through personnel changes on bass, with Reggie Workman replacing Davis and then Jimmy Garrison replacing Workman, establishing the quartet's classic lineup. The group recorded many albums widely considered jazz classics, including Coltrane "Live" at the Village Vanguard (1962), Ballads (1963), John Coltrane and Johnny Hartman (1963), Live at Birdland (1964), Crescent (1964), A Love Supreme (1964), and The John Coltrane Quartet Plays (1965) for Impulse! Records.

A Love Supreme, in particular, is recognized by consensus as one of the greatest jazz albums ever made. Tyner said, "the band had reached a very high level by that time .... [Coltrane] wanted to dig deep and bring us up to another level. And that's what he did."

While in Coltrane's group, Tyner also recorded albums as a leader, including trio recordings, such as his debut album, Inception (1962). In late 1962 and the first half of 1963, producer Bob Thiele asked Tyner to record other more straightforward jazz albums as a leader. These include Reaching Fourth (1963), Nights of Ballads & Blues (1963), Today and Tomorrow (1964), and McCoy Tyner Plays Ellington (1965).

Tyner also appeared as a sideman on many Blue Note Records albums of the 1960s, including classic recordings with Freddie Hubbard, Wayne Shorter, and Joe Henderson.

Tyner's maximalist playing style developed in close contact with Coltrane. In 2019, Sami Linna of the University of the Arts Helsinki wrote that Coltrane described the two different directions in his playing as "playing chordally (vertically) or melodically (horizontally)". Linna suggests that "Tyner would eventually find a way of dealing with the two directions simultaneously, in a manner that was supportive and complementary yet original and slightly different from Coltrane's approach." After 1960, Coltrane did not hire anyone to replace Tyner if he was unavailable; between the time Tyner joined the group (around the end of May 1960) and left (December 1965), no other pianist accompanied Coltrane.

Tyner's involvement with Coltrane ended in 1965. Coltrane's music was becoming much more atonal and free; he had also augmented his quartet with additional percussion players who threatened to drown out both Tyner and Jones, who left the following year. Tyner commented, "I didn't see myself making any contribution to that music. ... All I could hear was a lot of noise. I didn't have any feeling for the music, and when I don't have feelings, I don't play." Alice Coltrane then replaced Tyner as the group's pianist.

== Later solo career ==
In 1966, Tyner rehearsed with a new trio and embarked on a career as a bandleader. Inconsistent work initially discouraged him and led him to consider taking a day job to support his family, and he inquired about becoming a taxi driver. Eventually, Tyner established himself as a viable solo artist through a series of post-bop albums as a leader Blue Note released between 1967 and 1970. These include The Real McCoy (1967), Tender Moments (1967), Time for Tyner (1968) with vibraphonist Bobby Hutcherson, Expansions (1968), and Extensions (1970).

Tyner then signed with Milestone Records, where he developed an excellent working relationship with jazz producer Orrin Keepnews, who had previously worked closely with Thelonious Monk and Bill Evans. Tyner's first album with his new label, Sahara, earned him his first two Grammy nominations and was named Album of the Year in the DownBeat critics' poll. Tyner recorded 19 albums for the label before moving to Columbia, including a solo piano tribute to Coltrane titled Echoes of a Friend (1972), a number of small-group records like Enlightenment (1973) and Sama Layuca (1974), and two orchestral albums, Song of the New World (1973) and Fly with the Wind (1976), both featuring flutist Hubert Laws, various other wind instruments, and full string sections. Tyner did the orchestrations, drawing on Walter Piston's book Harmony. Front-line players featured on Tyner's Milestone recordings include Gary Bartz, Sonny Fortune, Azar Lawrence, and Woody Shaw.

Tyner's recordings for Blue Note and Milestone often took Coltrane Quartet's music as a point of departure; as Tyner said, "a lot of what I learned from [Coltrane] transferred" to his later work. Tyner also incorporated African and East Asian elements into his music. On Sahara, he played koto in addition to piano, flute, and percussion. On the trio recording Trident (1975), with bassist Ron Carter and Elvin Jones, Tyner played the harpsichord and celesta, instruments rarely heard in jazz. These albums have been cited as examples of innovative 1970s jazz that was neither fusion nor free jazz. Unlike many jazz keyboardists of his generation, Tyner rarely used electronic keyboards or synthesizers, saying, "To me, electronic instruments have more of an artificial sound. Emotionally I couldn't function on them."

In 1982, Tyner and a number of other notable jazz pianists participated in the recording Bill Evans: A Tribute (Avion Records). He played an 8½-minute solo version of Evans's "We Will Meet Again" in honor of his deceased colleague.

During the 1980s and 1990s, Tyner performed and recorded in a trio including Avery Sharpe on bass and Louis Hayes, then Aaron Scott, on drums. He also recorded a trilogy of solo or solo-with-guests albums for Blue Note, beginning with Revelations (1988) and culminating in Soliloquy (1991). In addition, he recorded another album with Bobby Hutcherson, Manhattan Moods, in 1993.

After signing with Telarc, he recorded, between 1998 and 2003, an album of Latin music, a trio album with Stanley Clarke and Al Foster, a solo album honoring fellow jazz piano legends from Earl Hines to Keith Jarrett, a new album with Hutcherson, and, finally, a quintet album, Illuminations, with Terence Blanchard and Gary Bartz. Tyner's last three albums were recorded for McCoy Tyner Music under the auspices of Half Note Records. These include a quartet recording with Joe Lovano, an album featuring various guest guitarists from Bill Frisell to Derek Trucks, and a live solo album.

Tyner stopped making recordings in 2007 even though he lived another 13 years. He continued to play gigs for a while after that but then quietly retired.

Tyner composed widely. His most frequently covered piece is "You Taught My Heart to Sing" (1985), for which Sammy Cahn wrote lyrics. Other compositions of his that have been recorded by a number of artists include "Aisha" (1961), "Inception" and "Effendi" (1962), and "Passion Dance", "Contemplation", "Search for Peace", and "Blues on the Corner", all from the 1967 album The Real McCoy.

== Personal life ==
Tyner married Aisha Saud while they were both in their teens; they had three sons. The marriage ended in divorce.

Tyner's younger brother Jarvis Tyner was executive vice-chairman of the Communist Party USA.

== Death ==
Tyner died at his home in Bergenfield, New Jersey, on March 6, 2020. He was 81. No cause of death was given, but he had been in ill health.

== Influence and playing style ==
Tyner is considered one of the most influential jazz pianists of the late 20th century, an honor he earned during and after his time with Coltrane.

Tyner, who was left-handed, played with a low bass left hand and raised his arm high above the keyboard for emphatic attacks. His right-hand soloing was detached and staccato. His melodic vocabulary was rich, ranging from raw blues to complex superimposed pentatonic scales; his approach to chord voicing (most characteristically by fourths) influenced contemporary jazz pianists such as Herbie Hancock, Chick Corea, John Hicks, and Kenny Barron. Some of Tyner's harmonic techniques have been connected to Claude Debussy, one of Tyner's favorite composers. Tyner's extensive use of non-tertiary harmony has also led to comparisons with the work of Paul Hindemith, but Tyner disavowed any direct influence in that case. Tyner did say he found inspiration in the music of Igor Stravinsky, Duke Ellington, and Art Tatum as well as in music from Japan, Turkey, and Africa.

In 1983, Tyner's colleague Randy Weston said of him: "He's showing the way to the future, yet he's maintaining the tradition, the rhythmic quality, the spiritual vitality, the humor, the sadness. ... McCoy is on the right track." Vijay Iyer, a younger jazz pianist who acknowledges Tyner's influence, said, "I've studied Tyner's fluidity, hard groove, and deep sonorities for decades. In the wake of his passing in 2020, I was again revisiting the moments in his playing that were formative for me." Jazz historian Kevin Whitehead wrote that Tyner "plays thundering, ambiguous chords under fast, right-hand melodies often based on five-note scales, a marker in jazz of African roots. His sound was heavy, but buoyant, billowing like blue smoke. His piano could toll like church bells. And he could really move, too."

In his History of Jazz, Ted Gioia sums up Tyner's style as follows:

Blessed with a crisp, clean piano attack and a sure sense of melodic development, Tyner could have been a premier hard-bop pianist. But alongside Coltrane, Tyner gradually grew to be much more. Where other pianists would have backed Coltrane's horn lines with throwaway comping chords, Tyner challenged the soloist with a tsunami of sound. ... Tyner delighted in ambiguous voicings, liberally spiced with suspended fourths that rarely resolved, often played with a thunderous two-handed attack that seemed destined to leave permanent marks in the keys. ... Single-note lines, leavened with wide, often unpredictable interval leaps, jostled with sweeping arpeggios, cascading runs, reverberating tremolos. His touch at the piano, which originally possessed brittle sharpness, took on volume and depth, eventually emerging as one of the fullest and most easily identifiable keyboard sounds in jazz. Tyner's career continued to flourish long after leaving Coltrane, and ... would influence many jazz pianists who came of age during that period. But though others mimicked Tyner's mannerisms, his voicings, and modal runs, these acolytes seldom approached the intensity of the original.

Grateful Dead rhythm guitarist Bob Weir has also cited Tyner as an influence on his playing.

== Awards and honors ==
Tyner was named a 2002 NEA Jazz Master by the National Endowment for the Arts. He won five Grammy Awards, all relatively late in his career: The Turning Point (1992) and Journey (1993) both won for Best Large Jazz Ensemble Album, and Blues for Coltrane: A Tribute to John Coltrane (1987), Infinity (1995), and Illuminations (2004) all won in the category of Best Instrumental Jazz Album.

Tyner was awarded an Honorary Doctorate of Music from Berklee College of Music at the Sala dei Notari during the Umbria Jazz Festival. He was also a judge for the 6th, 10th, and 11th annual Independent Music Awards. Steinway & Sons conferred a special gold medallion to Tyner for his 50 years as a Steinway artist.
