= McCoy Tyner discography =

This discography of jazz pianist McCoy Tyner contains albums that were released under his own name as well as albums on which he appeared.

== As leader/co-leader ==
Recording date	Title	Label	Year Released	Notes / Personnel
1962-01-10, -11	Inception	Impulse!	1962	Trio with Art Davis (bass), Elvin Jones (drums)
1962-11-14	Reaching Fourth	Impulse!	1963	Trio with Henry Grimes (b), Roy Haynes (d)
1963-03-04	Nights of Ballads & Blues	Impulse!	1963	Trio with Steve Davis (b), Lex Humphries (d)
1963-07-05	Live at Newport	Impulse!	1964	Live - Trio & Quintet with Bob Cranshaw (b), Mickey Roker (d), Clark Terry (trumpet), Charlie Mariano (alto sax)
1963-06-04, 1964-02-04	Today and Tomorrow	Impulse!	1964	Trio with Jimmy Garrison (b), Albert Heath (b); Sextet with Thad Jones (trumpet), Frank Strozier (alto sax), John Gilmore (tenor sax), Butch Warren (b), Elvin Jones (d)
1964-12-02, -07, -08	McCoy Tyner Plays Ellington	Impulse!	1965	Trio & Quintet with Jimmy Garrison (b), Elvin Jones (b), Willie Rodriguez (percussion), Johnny Pacheco (percussion)
1966-04	Forces of Nature: Live at Slugs'	Blue Note	2024	Live - Quartet with Joe Henderson (tenor sax), Henry Grimes (b), Jack DeJohnette (d) [2LPs/2CDs]
1967-04-21	The Real McCoy	Blue Note	1967	Quartet with Joe Henderson (tenor sax), Ron Carter (b), Elvin Jones (d)
1967-12-01	Tender Moments	Blue Note	1968	Nonet with Lee Morgan (trumpet), Julian Priester (trombone), Bob Northern (French horn), Howard Johnson (tuba), James Spaulding (alto sax & flute), Bennie Maupin (tenor sax), Herbie Lewis (b), Joe Chambers (d)
1968-05-17	Time for Tyner	Blue Note	1969	Quartet, Trio, & Solo with Bobby Hutcherson (vibes), Herbie Lewis (b), Freddie Waits (d)
1968-08-23	Expansions	Blue Note	1970	Septet with Woody Shaw (trumpet), Gary Bartz (alto sax), Wayne Shorter (tenor sax), Ron Carter (cello), Herbie Lewis (b), Freddie Waits (d)
1970-02-09	Extensions	Blue Note	1973	Quintet & Sextet with Gary Bartz (alto sax), Wayne Shorter (soprano & tenor saxes), Ron Carter (b), Elvin Jones (d), Alice Coltrane (harp, 3 tracks)
1968-11-22, 1969-04-04, 1970-07-21	Cosmos	Blue Note	1976	Trio & larger groups with Herbie Lewis (b), Freddie Waits (d), 5 woodwind players, string quartet [2LPs]
1970-09-10	Asante	Blue Note	1974	Sextet & Quintet (two different groups) with "Songai" Sandra Smith (vocals, 2 tracks)
1972-01	Sahara	Milestone	1972	Quartet with Sonny Fortune, Calvin Hill, Alphonse Mouzon (all various instruments)
1972-11-11	Echoes of a Friend	JVC, Milestone	1972	Solo piano
1972-09-06, 1972-11-27	Song for My Lady	Milestone	1973	Quartet & Septet with Sonny Fortune (woodwinds), Calvin Hill (b), Alphonse Mouzon (d) and on 3 tracks Charles Tolliver (flugelhorn), Michael White (violin), James Mtume (percussion)
1973-04-06, -09	Song of the New World	Milestone	1973	Orchestral featuring Hubert Laws (flute), Alphonse Mouzon (d), conducted by William Fischer
1973-07-07	Enlightenment	Milestone	1973	Live at the Montreux Jazz Festival - Quartet with Azar Lawrence (soprano & tenor saxes), Juini Booth (b), Alphonse Mouzon (d) [2LPs/1CD]
1974-03-26, -28	Sama Layuca	Milestone	1974	Nonet with John Stubblefield (flute & oboe), Azar Lawrence (soprano & tenor saxes), Gary Bartz (alto sax), Bobby Hutcherson (vibes & marimba), Buster Williams (b), Billy Hart (d), Guilherme Franco & James Mtume, percussion
1974-08-31, 1974-09-01	Atlantis	Milestone	1975	Live at the Keystone Korner - Quintet with Azar Lawrence (soprano & tenor saxes), Juini Booth (b), Wilby Fletcher (d), Guilherme Franco (percussion) [2LPs/1CD]
1975-02-18, -19	Trident	Milestone	1975	Trio with Ron Carter (b), Elvin Jones (d); Tyner plays celesta & harpsichord on 2 tracks each
1976-01-19 – -21	Fly with the Wind	Milestone	1976	Orchestral featuring Hubert Laws (flute), conducted by William Fischer
1976-08-04 – -07	Focal Point	Milestone	1976	Septet with Joe Ford, Gary Bartz, & Ron Bridgewater (woodwinds), Charles Fambrough (b), Eric Gravatt (d), Guilherme Franco (percussion); Tyner plays dulcimer on 1 track
1977-04-09 – -12	Supertrios	Milestone	1977	Trios with Ron Carter (b), Tony Williams (d) & Eddie Gómez (b), Jack DeJohnette (d)
1977-09-01, -02, -06, -07, -08	Inner Voices	Milestone	1977	Orchestral with Ron Carter (b), Earl Klugh (guitar, 3 tracks), 12-piece horn section, percussion, & 7-member chorus
1978-03-17, -18	The Greeting	Milestone	1978	Live at the Great American Music Hall - Sextet with Joe Ford (flute & alto sax), George Adams (soprano & tenor saxes), Charles Fambrough (b), Woody Theus (d), Guilherme Franco (percussion)
1978-07-28	Passion Dance	Milestone	1978	Live at Live Under the Sky - Trio & Solo with Ron Carter (b), Tony Williams (d)
1978-07-28	Counterpoints: Live in Tokyo	Milestone	2004	Live at Live Under the Sky - Trio & Duo with Ron Carter (b, 3 tracks), Tony Williams (d)
1978-08-31, 1978-09-03	Together	Milestone	1979	Octet with Freddie Hubbard (trumpet & flugelhorn), Hubert Laws (flute), Bernie Maupin (tenor sax & bass clarinet), Bobby Hutcherson (vibes & marimba), Stanley Clarke (b), Jack DeJohnette (d), Bill Summers (percussion)
1979-04-24, -25	Horizon	Milestone	1980	Septet with Joe Ford & George Adams (woodwinds), John Blake Jr. (violin), Charles Fambrough (b), Al Foster (d), Guilherme Franco (congas)
1980-03-03, -05, -06, 1980-05-29	Quartets 4 X 4	Milestone	1980	Quartets with varying lineups featuring Freddie Hubbard & Bobby Hutcherson [2LPs/1CD]
1980-10	13th House	Milestone	1981	Big band featuring Hubert Laws & Joe Ford, Ron Carter (b), Jack DeJohnette (d)
1981	La Leyenda de La Hora	Columbia	1981	Orchestral, conducted by William Fischer
1982	Looking Out	Columbia	1982-06	Orchestral featuring Gary Bartz (alto sax), Carlos Santana (guitar), Phyllis Hyman (vocals)
1982-04-13, -14	Love & Peace (with Elvin Jones) (also released as Reunited)	Trio (Japan)	1982-08	Quintet with Pharoah Sanders (tenor sax), Jean-Paul Bourelly (guitar), Richard Davis (b), Elvin Jones (d)
1983-10	Dimensions	Elektra/Musician	1984	Quintet with Gary Bartz (alto sax), John Blake Jr. (violin), John Lee (b), Wilby Fletcher (d)
1985-04-06, -07	It's About Time (with Jackie McLean)	Blue Note	1985	Sextet with Jon Faddis (trumpet, 3 tracks), Jackie McLean (alt sax, 4 tracks), Ron Carter or Marcus Miller (b), Al Foster (d), Steve Thornton (percussion, 3 tracks)
1985	Just Feelin'	Palo Alto	1985	Quartet with Avery Sharpe (b), Louis Hayes (d), Babatunde Lea (percussion)
1986-06-07, -09	Double Trios	Denon	1986	Trios or Quartets with Avery Sharpe (b), Louis Hayes (d) or Marcus Miller (b), Jeff "Tain" Watts (d); Steve Thornton (percussion, 5 tracks)
1987-04-27 – -29	Major Changes (with Frank Morgan)	Blue Note	1987	Quartet with Frank Morgan (alto saxophone), Avery Sharpe (b), Louis Hayes (d)
1987-06-09	Bon Voyage	Timeless	1987	Trio with Avery Sharpe (b), Louis Hayes (d)
1987-07-09	Blues for Coltrane: A Tribute to John Coltrane	Impulse!	1988	Quintet with David Murray & Pharoah Sanders (tenor saxes), Cecil McBee (b), Roy Haynes (d)
1987-07-24, -25	Live at the Musicians Exchange Cafe (also released as What's New?, The Real McCoy, and Hip Toe)	Who's Who in Jazz	1988	Live at The Musicians Exchange Cafe, Fort Lauderdale, Florida Trio with Avery Sharpe (b), Louis Hayes (d)
1988-10-25, 26, -27	Revelations	Blue Note	1989	Solo piano, recorded at Merkin Hall, NYC
1988-11-25, -26	Uptown/Downtown	Milestone	1989	Live at the Blue Note, NYC - big band
1989-05-19, -20	Live at Sweet Basil	Paddle Wheel	1989	Live at the Sweet Basil, NYC - Trio with Avery Sharpe (b), Aaron Scott (d)
1989-05-19, -20	Live at Sweet Basil Vol.2	Paddle Wheel	1990	Live at the Sweet Basil, NYC - Trio with Avery Sharpe (b), Aaron Scott (d)
1989-11-02, -27	Things Aint What They Used to Be	Blue Note	1990	Solo & duo, with George Adams (tenor sax, 2 tracks), John Scofield (guitar, 3 tracks), recorded at Kaufman Music Center, NYC
1990-04-18	One on One	Milestone	1990	Duo with Stéphane Grappelli (violin)
1991-02-11, -12	Blue Bossa	Milestone	1991	Quintet with Claudio Roditi (trumpet & flugelhorn), Avery Sharpe (b), Aaron Scott (d), Rafael Santa Cruz (percussion)
1991-02-11, -12	Autumn Mood	Laserlight	1997	Quintet (same as Blue Bossa above)
1991-2-19 – -21	Soliloquy	Blue Note	1992	Solo piano
1991-02-27, -28	Remembering John	Enja	1991	Trio with Avery Sharpe (b), Aaron Scott (d)
1991-04-03, -04	New York Reunion	Chesky	1991	Quartet with Joe Henderson (tenor sax), Ron Carter (b), Al Foster (d)
1991-05-11	44th Street Suite	Red Baron	1991	Quintet & Quartet with Ron Carter (b), Aaron Scott (d), Arthur Blythe (alto sax, 5 tracks), David Murray (tenor sax, 4 tracks)
1991-06-14	Solar: Live at Sweet Basil	Alfa	1991	Live at the Sweet Basil, NYC - Trio with Avery Sharpe (b), Aaron Scott (d)
1991-06-14	Key of Soul	Alfa/Sweet Basil	1992	Live at the Sweet Basil, NYC - Trio with Avery Sharpe (b), Aaron Scott (d)
1991-10-24 – -27	Live in Warsaw (also released as Warsaw Concert 1991, At the Warsaw Jamboree and Beautiful Love)	Who's Who in Jazz	1991	Live at the Warsaw Jazz Jamboree - solo piano
1991-11-19, -20	The Turning Point	Birdology	1992	Big band
1993-05-24 – -27	Journey	Birdology	1993	Big band, Dianne Reeves (vocal, 1 track)
1993-12-03, -04	Manhattan Moods	Blue Note	1994	Duo with Bobby Hutcherson (vibes & marimba)
1994-11-26, -27	Prelude and Sonata	Milestone	1995	Quintet & Quartet with Antonio Hart (alto sax), Joshua Redman (tenor sax, 3 tracks), Christian McBride (b), Marvin Smith (d)
1995-04-12 – -14	Infinity	Impulse!	1995	Quintet with Michael Brecker (tenor sax), Avery Sharpe (b), Aaron Scott (d), Valtinho Anastacio (percussion)
1996-03-05, -06	What the World Needs Now: The Music of Burt Bacharach	Impulse!	1997	Orchestral with Christian McBride (b), Lewis Nash (d), John Clayton (arranger & conductor)
1997-09-23	McCoy Tyner Plays John Coltrane: Live at the Village Vanguard	Impulse!	2001	Live at the Village Vanguard, NYC - Trio with George Mraz (b), Al Foster (d)
1998-07-29, -30	McCoy Tyner and the Latin All-Stars	Telarc	1999	Nonet
1999-04-28, -29	McCoy Tyner with Stanley Clarke and Al Foster	Telarc	2000	Trio with Stanley Clarke (b), Al Foster (d)
2000-06-13, -14	Jazz Roots	Telarc	2000	Solo piano
2002-12-10, -11	Land of Giants	Telarc	2003	Quartet with Bobby Hutcherson (vibes), Charnett Moffett (b), Eric Harland (d)
2003-11-18, -19	Illuminations	Telarc	2004	Quintet with Terence Blanchard (trumpet), Gary Bartz (alto sax), Christian McBride (b), Lewis Nash (d)
2006-12-30, -31	Quartet	McCoy Tyner Music	2007	Live at Yoshi's, Oakland - Quartet with Joe Lovano (tenor sax), Christian McBride (b), Jeff "Tain" Watts (d)
2006-09-07, -25	Guitars	McCoy Tyner Music	2008	Ron Carter (b), Jack DeJohnette (d); 4 guest guitarists: Marc Ribot (4 tracks), John Scofield (2 tracks), Derek Trucks (2 tracks), Bill Frisell (3 tracks); Béla Fleck (banjo, 3 tracks)
2007-05-06	Solo: Live from San Francisco	McCoy Tyner Music	2009	Live at the Herbst Theatre, San Francisco - solo piano

== Compilations ==
- The Best of McCoy Tyner (Blue Note, 1996) – recorded 1967–1970
- Solar: Live at Sweet Basil (Alfa/Sweet Basil, 1997) – combined the same title album (1991) and Key of Soul (1992)
- The Best of the McCoy Tyner Big Band (Birdology/Dreyfus Jazz, 2002) – combined The Turning Point (1992) and Journey (1993)
- Afro Blue (Telarc, 2007) – recorded 1998–2003
- I Grandi Del Jazz: McCoy Tyner (Fabbri Editori, 1982)
- The Definitive McCoy Tyner (Blue Note, 2002)
- Great Trios (EmArcy, 2003)
- The Impulse Story (Impulse!, 2006)
- Milestone Profiles: McCoy Tyner (Milestone, 2006)
- Jazz Profile: McCoy Tyner (Blue Note, 1997)
- Priceless Jazz Collection 27 (GRP, 1998)

== As sideman ==
with John Coltrane

- Coltrane Jazz (Atlantic, 1961) – only on "Village Blues"
- My Favorite Things (Atlantic, 1961) - rec. 1960
- Coltrane's Sound (Atlantic, 1964) – rec. 1960
- Coltrane Plays the Blues (Atlantic, 1962) – rec. 1960
- Olé Coltrane (Atlantic, 1961)
- Africa/Brass (Impulse!, 1961)
- Coltrane "Live" at the Village Vanguard (Impulse!, 1962) – rec. 1961
- Coltrane (Impulse!, 1962)
- Ballads (Impulse!, 1963) – rec. 1961–1962
- John Coltrane and Johnny Hartman (Impulse!, 1963)
- Impressions (Impulse!, 1963)
- Live at Birdland (Impulse!, 1963)
- Crescent (Impulse!, 1964)
- A Love Supreme (Impulse!, 1965) – rec. 1964
- The John Coltrane Quartet Plays (Impulse!, 1965)
- The New Wave in Jazz (Impulse!, 1965) – live
- Ascension (Impulse!, 1966) – rec. 1965
- New Thing at Newport (Impulse!, 1966) – live rec. 1965
- Meditations (Impulse!, 1966) – rec. 1965
- Kulu Sé Mama (Impulse!, 1967) – rec. 1965
- Om (Impulse!, 1968) – rec. 1965
- The Coltrane Legacy (Atlantic, 1970) – compilation of outtakes rec. 1959–1961
- Transition (Impulse!, 1970) – rec. 1965
- Sun Ship (Impulse!, 1971) – rec. 1965
- Afro Blue Impressions (Pablo, 1977) – rec. 1963
- First Meditations (Impulse!, 1977) – rec. 1965
- To the Beat of a Different Drum (Impulse!, 1978) – rec. 1963–1965
- Like Sonny (Roulette, 1990) – rec. 1960 and released in original form in 1962
- Living Space (Impulse!, 1998) – rec. 1965
- So Many Things: The European Tour 1961 (Acrobat, 2015) - rec. 1961
- Both Directions at Once: The Lost Album (Impulse!, 2019) – rec. 1963
- Evenings at the Village Gate: John Coltrane with Eric Dolphy (Impulse!, 2023) - rec. 1961

with Curtis Fuller

- 1959: Imagination (Savoy, 1960)
- 1960: Images of Curtis Fuller (Savoy, 1960)

with Grant Green

- 1964: Matador (Blue Note, 1979)
- 1964: Solid (Blue Note, 1979)

with Joe Henderson

- 1963: Page One (Blue Note, 1963)
- 1964: In 'N Out (Blue Note, 1965)
- 1964: Inner Urge (Blue Note, 1966)

with Freddie Hubbard

- 1960: Open Sesame (Blue Note, 1960)
- 1960: Goin' Up (Blue Note, 1961)
- 1961: Ready for Freddie (Blue Note, 1962)
- 1965–1966: Blue Spirits (Blue Note, 1967)

with Bobby Hutcherson

- 1966: Stick-Up! (Blue Note, 1968)
- 1981–1982: Solo / Quartet (Contemporary, 1982)

with Milt Jackson

- 1964: In a New Setting (Limelight, 1965)
- 1964–1965: I/We Had a Ball (Limelight, 1965) – 1 track

with Hank Mobley

- 1965: A Caddy for Daddy (Blue Note, 1967)
- 1966: A Slice of the Top (Blue Note, 1979)
- 1966: Straight No Filter (Blue Note, 1985)

with Lee Morgan

- 1964: Tom Cat (Blue Note, 1980)
- 1966: Delightfulee (Blue Note, 1967)

with Wayne Shorter

- 1964: Night Dreamer (Blue Note, 1964)
- 1964: JuJu (Blue Note, 1965)
- 1965: The Soothsayer (Blue Note, 1979)

with Stanley Turrentine

- 1964: Mr. Natural (Blue Note, 1980)
- 1966: Rough 'n' Tumble (Blue Note, 1966)
- 1966: Easy Walker (Blue Note, 1968)
- 1966: The Spoiler (Blue Note, 1967)
- 1967: A Bluish Bag (Blue Note, 2007)
- 1967: The Return of the Prodigal Son (Blue Note, 2008)

with others

- George Benson, Tenderly (Warner Bros., 1989)
- Art Blakey, A Jazz Message (Impulse! 1964)
- John Blake, Jr., Maiden Dance (Gramavision, 1984)
- Donald Byrd, Mustang! (Blue Note, 1967)
- Eric Dolphy, 1961 (Jazz Connoisseur, late 1970s)
- Lou Donaldson, Lush Life (Blue Note, 1980)
- Art Farmer and Benny Golson, Meet the Jazztet (Argo, 1960)
- Steve Grossman, In New York (Dreyfus Jazz, 1993)
- J. J. Johnson, Proof Positive (Impulse!, 1964) – 1 track
- Blue Mitchell, Heads Up (Blue Note, 1968)
- David Murray, Special Quartet (DIW/Columbia, 1990)
- Julian Priester, Spiritsville (Jazzland, 1960)
- Flora Purim, Encounter (Milestone, 1977)
- Sonny Rollins, Ron Carter, and Al Foster, Milestone Jazzstars in Concert (Milestone, 1978)
- Avery Sharpe, Unspoken Words (Sunnyside, 1989)
- Woody Shaw, Jackie McLean, Cecil McBee, and Jack DeJohnette, One Night with Blue Note Preserved Volume Two (Blue Note, 1985)
- Sonny Stitt, Loose Walk (Musica Jazz/Philology, 1993)
