= Revelations (McCoy Tyner album) =

Live album by McCoy Tyner
- Released: 1989
- Recorded: October 25–27, 1988
- Venue: Merkin Hall, NYC
- Genre: Jazz
- Label: Blue Note
- Producer: Michael Cuscuna

McCoy Tyner chronology
Live at the Musicians Exchange Cafe (1987)	Revelations (1989)	Uptown/Downtown (1988)

Professional ratings
Review scores
Source	Rating
AllMusic	4/5 stars

Revelations is an album by jazz pianist McCoy Tyner released on the Blue Note label. It was Tyner's first solo piano album since Echoes of a Friend (1972) and first Blue Note recording (apart from 1985's It's About Time with Jackie McLean) since Asante (1970). It was recorded at Merkin Hall in New York City in October 1988.

Producer Michael Cuscuna writes in the liner notes, "McCoy did a couple of takes of 'Don't Blame Me' the first day. I was amazed. What was on tape was already beyond my expectations for the project. McCoy came downstairs for a playback and smiled, 'Boy I must be in a mood to do this!' Inspired by the environment, the piano sound and his own seemingly endless flow of ideas, McCoy set down thirteen pieces over the three days, most of them in one or two takes."

== Repertoire ==
The album features seven well-known jazz standards interspersed with five originals by Tyner and one piece by his former employer and mentor John Coltrane, "Lazy Bird" (styled here as "Lazybird") from the 1958 album Blue Train.

Two of Tyner's originals were new compositions, "View from the Hill" and "Rio". Tyner had recorded the other three previously but not in solo versions: "Contemplation" is from the 1967 album The Real McCoy, "Peresina" comes from Expansions recorded the following year, and "You Taught My Heart to Sing"—which went on to become Tyner's most widely covered piece—first appeared on the 1985 album It's About Time. The last three recordings on the album—"Autumn Leaves", "Peresina", and "When I Fall in Love"—appear only on the CD edition, not the LP.

== Reception ==
The AllMusic review by Scott Yanow states that "Tyner at times on this record sounds romantic and in other spots hints a bit at Art Tatum. This is a rather special project from one of the finest jazz pianists of the past 35 years."

Jazzwise included this album on its list of "11 essential" McCoy Tyner albums, calling the recording "A remarkable artistic success."

== Track listing ==
1. "Yesterdays" (Harbach, Kern) - 4:40
2. "You Taught My Heart to Sing" (Cahn, Tyner) - 5:12
3. "In a Mellow Tone" (Ellington, Gabler) - 3:36
4. "View from the Hill" - 4:03
5. "Lazy Bird" (Coltrane) - 3:55
6. "Don't Blame Me" (Fields, McHugh) - 5:41
7. "Rio" - 4:43
8. "How Deep Is the Ocean?" (Berlin) - 3:59
9. "Someone to Watch Over Me" (Gershwin, Gershwin) - 3:35
10. "Contemplation" - 5:27
11. "Autumn Leaves" (Kosma, Mercer, Prévert) - 4:08 Bonus track on CD
12. "Peresina" - 6:08 Bonus track on CD
13. "When I Fall in Love" (Heyman, Young) - 4:07 Bonus track on CD

All compositions by McCoy Tyner except as indicated
- Recorded at Merkin Hall, NYC, October 25 (tracks 2, 5, 6, 9 & 10), 26 (tracks 1, 3, 7, 8 & 13) and 27 (tracks 4, 11 & 12), 1988

== Personnel ==
- McCoy Tyner – piano
