= In New York (Steve Grossman album) =

Live album by Steve Grossman with the McCoy Tyner Trio
- Released: 1991
- Recorded: September 13–14, 1991
- Genre: Jazz
- Length: 72:54
- Label: Dreyfus

Steve Grossman chronology
Do It (1991)	In New York (1991)	A Small Hotel (1993)

McCoy Tyner chronology
Key of Soul (1991)	In New York (1991)	Solar (1992)

Professional ratings
Review scores
Source	Rating
AllMusic	3/5 stars

In New York is a 1991 live album by tenor saxophonist Steve Grossman with the McCoy Tyner Trio released on the Dreyfus label. It was recorded in September 1991 at Sweet Basil in New York City and features a live performance by Grossman and Tyner with bassist Avery Sharpe and drummer Art Taylor. The AllMusic review by Richard Ginell states "With this kind of firepower, the listener is usually guaranteed a satisfying level of cooking jazz, and that's certainly what we get here, though it seldom rises above that into a higher region".

== Track listing ==
1. "Speak Low" (Nash, Weill) – 13:16
2. "My Ship" (Gershwin, Weill) – 9:45
3. "Softly, As in a Morning Sunrise" (Hammerstein, Romberg) – 12:10
4. "Impressions" (Coltrane) – 10:15
5. "Over the Rainbow" (Arlen, Harburg) – 9:29
6. "Love for Sal" (Grossman) – 8:58
7. "Good Bait" (Basie, Dameron) – 9:01

- Recorded at Sweet Basil, New York, New York on September 13 & 14, 1991

== Personnel ==
- Steve Grossman – tenor saxophone
- McCoy Tyner – piano
- Avery Sharpe – bass
- Art Taylor – drums
