= Time for Tyner =

Studio album by McCoy Tyner
- Released: August 1969
- Recorded: May 17, 1968
- Studio: Van Gelder Studio, Englewood Cliffs, NJ
- Genre: Jazz, post-bop, modal jazz
- Length: 42:56
- Label: Blue Note BST 84307
- Producer: Duke Pearson

McCoy Tyner chronology
Tender Moments (1968)	Time for Tyner (1969)	Expansions (1968)

Time for Tyner is the ninth album as a leader by jazz pianist McCoy Tyner and his third released on the Blue Note label. It was recorded in May 1968 and features performances by Tyner with vibraphonist Bobby Hutcherson, bassist Herbie Lewis, and drummer Freddie Waits.

The album includes three Tyner originals followed by three jazz standards. The first four tracks are played by the full quartet, the fifth by a trio (without Hutcherson), and the final track is a piano solo.

Tyner and Hutcherson became good friends and recorded together a number of times through the years. At this point, Tyner had already appeared on Hutcherson's Blue Note album Stick-Up! (1966). Later, they reprised the quartet format of Time for Tyner on three tracks of Tyner's Quartets 4 X 4 (1980) and on Land of Giants (2003) as well as on four tracks from Hutcherson's Solo / Quartet (1982). Tyner also included Hutcherson on three larger ensemble projects: Sama Layuca (1974), Together (1979), and La Leyenda de La Hora (1981). As co-leaders, they recorded the duo album Manhattan Moods (1993).

Time for Tyner was remastered by Rudy Van Gelder in 2004 and issued on CD the following year as part of the Rudy Van Gelder Edition.

== Reception ==
Professional ratings
Review scores
Source	Rating
Allmusic	4/5 stars
DownBeat	4/5 stars
The Penguin Guide to Jazz	4/4 stars
The Rolling Stone Jazz Record Guide	4/5 stars

Harvey Pekar, writing for DownBeat in a contemporary review, said Tyner's playing was "quite inspired and vigorous" and that Tyner "seemingly always performs with discipline and good taste." The Penguin Guide to Jazz selected this album as part of its suggested "Core Collection", calling it "a powerhouse performance from first to last." The AllMusic review by Scott Yanow calls the album "A fine all-round showcase for McCoy Tyner in the late '60s."

An All About Jazz review by John Kelman says, "Tyner's three originals here are characteristic of his writing at the time, logical expansions on the modal approach he honed in his years with John Coltrane. ... While the ensuing years have proven Time for Tyner to be more of a way station than a push forward, it's still fully deserving of the Van Gelder remaster treatment. It's also proof that Tyner's ability to reinvent standards was certainly on par with his own compositional acumen."

Reed Jackson, writing for Spectrum Culture, states, "Of the three original tracks on Time for Tyner, the first, 'African Village,' is the strongest, and on it Hutcherson all but takes center stage. It opens with a punchy, propulsive bass line from Herbie Lewis, the kind of instantly effective, eminently repeatable riff that, in a few years, fusion bands would be building whole songs around. ... Hutcherson delivers the main melodic thrust, a killer three-part climb and descent, which Tyner alternately elaborates upon in dizzying staccato bursts or bolsters with tolling chords." The review concludes, "While Time for Tyner does not have the unadulterated sweep of Tyner's major '70s albums such as Sahara, it is a valuable record of an artist approaching new territory."

== Track listing ==
All compositions by McCoy Tyner except as noted.

1. "African Village" - 12:11
2. "Little Madimba" - 8:34
3. "May Street" - 5:22
4. "I Didn't Know What Time It Was" (Hart, Rodgers) - 7:10
5. "The Surrey with the Fringe on Top" (Hammerstein, Rodgers) - 5:12
6. "I've Grown Accustomed to Her Face" (Lerner, Loewe) - 4:27

== Personnel ==
- McCoy Tyner - piano
- Bobby Hutcherson - vibes (tracks 1–4)
- Herbie Lewis - bass (tracks 1–5)
- Freddie Waits - drums (tracks 1–5)
