= Soliloquy (McCoy Tyner album) =

Live album by McCoy Tyner
- Released: 1992
- Recorded: February 19–21, 1991
- Studio: Merkin Hall, New York City
- Genre: Jazz
- Label: Blue Note

McCoy Tyner chronology
Autumn Mood (1997)	Soliloquy (1992)	Remembering John (1991)

Professional ratings
Review scores
Source	Rating
AllMusic	4/5 stars
The Penguin Guide to Jazz	4/4 stars

Soliloquy is a 1991 album by McCoy Tyner released by Blue Note Records. Like Revelations (1987) and Things Ain't What They Used to Be (1989) Soliloquy was recorded at Merkin Hall without an audience and features solo performances by Tyner. The AllMusic review by Scott Yanow states that "McCoy Tyner always sounds in prime form and these diverse songs bring out the best in his passionate style. Highly recommended."

== Track listing ==
All compositions by McCoy Tyner except where indicated

1. "Crescent" (John Coltrane) – 5:02
2. "Española" – 3:58
3. "All the Things You Are" (Oscar Hammerstein II, Jerome Kern) – 4:15
4. "Twilight Mist" – 5:15
5. "Willow Weep for Me" (Ann Ronell) – 5:39
6. "Lonnie's Lament" (Coltrane) – 6:00
7. "Tivoli" (Dexter Gordon) – 4:35
8. "Tribute to Lady Day" – 4:45
9. "I Should Care" (Sammy Cahn, Axel Stordahl, Paul Weston) – 4:01
10. "Three Flowers" – 4:47
11. "Bouncing with Bud" (Bud Powell) – 2:58
12. "After the Rain" (Coltrane) – 3:50
13. "Effendi" – 4:01
14. "Crescent" [alternate take] (Coltrane) – 4:56

== Personnel ==
- McCoy Tyner – piano
