= Four Seasons (Bobby Hutcherson album) =

Studio album by Bobby Hutcherson, George Cables, Herbie Lewis and Philly Joe Jones
- Released: 1985
- Recorded: December 11, 1983
- Studio: Studio 44, Monster, Holland
- Genre: Jazz
- Length: 45:51
- Label: Baystate · Timeless
- Producer: Makoto Kimata, Wim Wigt

Bobby Hutcherson chronology
| Solo / Quartet (1982) | Four Seasons (1985) | Good Bait (1985) |

Original release
- Nice Groove (Baystate, 1984)

Four Seasons is an album by vibraphonist Bobby Hutcherson, pianist George Cables, bassist Herbie Lewis and drummer Philly Joe Jones featuring performances recorded in 1983 and originally given limited release in 1984 in Japan on Baystate as Nice Groove before being more widely released the following year on the Dutch Timeless label.

== Reception ==
Professional ratings
Review scores
| Source | Rating |
|---|---|
| Allmusic | 3/5 stars |

On Allmusic, Scott Yanow observed "This set by vibraphonist Bobby Hutcherson is a bit unusual in that, rather than playing complex originals, he interprets seven jazz standards. ... Hutcherson sounds in top form".

== Track listing ==
1. "I Mean You" (Thelonious Monk) – 5:49
2. "All of You" (Cole Porter) – 5:54
3. "Spring Is Here" (Richard Rodgers, Lorenz Hart) – 7:03
4. "Star Eyes" (Don Raye, Gene de Paul) – 7:47
5. "If I Were a Bell" (Frank Loesser) – 5:37
6. "Summertime" (George Gershwin, DuBose Heyward) – 6:50
7. "Autumn Leaves" (Joseph Kosma, Jacques Prévert, Johnny Mercer) – 6:36

== Personnel ==
- Bobby Hutcherson – vibraphone
- George Cables - piano
- Herbie Lewis – bass
- Philly Joe Jones – drums
