= Good Bait (album) =

Studio album by Bobby Hutcherson
- Released: 1985
- Recorded: August 9–10, 1984
- Studio: Fantasy Studio "C", Berkeley CA
- Genre: Jazz
- Length: 40:50
- Label: Landmark; LLP 501/LCD 1501
- Producer: Orrin Keepnews

Bobby Hutcherson chronology
Four Seasons (1985)	Good Bait (1985)	Color Schemes (1986)

Good Bait is an album by vibraphonist Bobby Hutcherson featuring performances recorded in 1984 and released the following year as the first recording on Orrin Keepnews's Landmark label.

== Reception ==
Professional ratings
Review scores
Source	Rating
AllMusic	4/5 stars

On AllMusic, Scott Yanow observed "Hutcherson performs a strong set of solid advanced hard bop".

== Track listing ==
All compositions by Bobby Hutcherson except where noted.

1. "Love Samba" (McCoy Tyner) – 7:19
2. "Good Bait" (Tadd Dameron) – 6:09
3. "Highway One" – 7:18
4. "In Walked Bud" (Thelonious Monk) – 5:27
5. "Montgomery" – 4:38
6. "Spring Is Here" (Richard Rodgers, Lorenz Hart) – 6:18
7. "Israel" (John Carisi) – 4:41

== Personnel ==
- Bobby Hutcherson – vibraphone
- Branford Marsalis – soprano saxophone, tenor saxophone (tracks 1–5 & 7)
- George Cables – piano
- Ray Drummond – bass
- Philly Joe Jones – drums
