= Up with Donald Byrd =

Studio album by Donald Byrd
- Released: 1965
- Recorded: November 3–4 & 6 & December 16, 1964
- Studios: Van Gelder Studios, Englewood Cliffs, New Jersey; A&R Studios, New York City
- Genre: Jazz
- Label: Verve
- Producer: Creed Taylor

Donald Byrd chronology
A New Perspective (1962)	Up with Donald Byrd (1965)	I'm Tryin' to Get Home (1964)

Up with Donald Byrd is an album by American trumpeter Donald Byrd featuring performances by Byrd with Jimmy Heath, Stanley Turrentine, Herbie Hancock and Kenny Burrell recorded in 1964. It was released on the Verve label in 1965 as V/V6 8609.

== Reception ==
The AllMusic review by Scott Yanow awarded the album 2 1/2 stars and stated "The music is mostly pretty forgettable despite such top sidemen... A lesser effort".

Professional ratings
Review scores
Source	Rating
AllMusic	2.5/5 stars

== Song listing ==
All compositions by Donald Byrd except as indicated

1. "Blind Man, Blind Man" (Herbie Hancock) – 2:51
2. "Boom Boom" (John Lee Hooker) – 4:21
3. "House of the Rising Sun" (Traditional) – 5:05
4. "See See Rider" (Ma Rainey) – 3:58
5. "Cantaloupe Island" (Hancock) – 6:46
6. "Bossa" – 7:56
7. "Sometimes I Feel Like a Motherless Child" (Traditional; arranged by Donald Byrd) – 5:13
8. "You've Been Talkin' 'Bout Me Baby" (Gale Garnett, Walter Hirsch, Ray Rivera) – 2:39
9. "My Babe" (Willie Dixon) – 2:48

- tracks 1–4, 8 & 9 recorded at A. & R. Studios, New York City November 3, 4 & 6, 1964; tracks 5–7 recorded at Van Gelder Studios, Englewood Cliffs, N.J. December 16, 1964

== Personnel ==
- Donald Byrd – trumpet; arranger and conductor (tracks 6 & 7)
- Jimmy Heath (tracks 1–4, 8 & 9), Stanley Turrentine (tracks 5–7) – tenor saxophone
- Herbie Hancock – piano; arranger and conductor (track 5)
- Kenny Burrell – guitar
- Bob Cranshaw (tracks 1–4, 8 & 9), Ron Carter (tracks 5–7) – bass
- Grady Tate – drums
- Candido Camero – percussion (tracks 5–7)
- The Donald Byrd Singers – vocals
- Claus Ogerman – arranger and conductor (tracks 1–4, 8 & 9)

Technical

- Val Valentin – director of engineering
- Phil Ramone, Rudy Van Gelder – engineer
- Michael Malatak – cover design
