= High Blues Pressure =

Studio album by Freddie Hubbard
- Released: May 1968
- Recorded: November 13, 1967
- Genre: Jazz
- Length: 41:15
- Label: Atlantic
- Producer: Joel Dorn

Freddie Hubbard chronology
Backlash (1966)	High Blues Pressure (1968)	A Soul Experiment (1969)

Professional ratings
Review scores
Source	Rating
Allmusic	3/5 stars
DownBeat	4/5 stars

High Blues Pressure is an album by trumpeter Freddie Hubbard. It was his second release on the Atlantic label and features performances by Hubbard, James Spaulding, Bennie Maupin, Herbie Lewis, Roman "Dog" Broadus, Weldon Irvine, Kenny Barron, Freddie Waits, Louis Hayes, Howard Johnson, and Kiane Zawadi.

== Track listing ==
1. "Can't Let Her Go" (Weldon Irvine) - 6:13
2. "Latina" - 4:47
3. "High Blues Pressure" - 7:31
4. "A Bientot" (Billy Taylor) - 7:37
5. "True Colors" - 5:29
6. "For B.P." - 9:44

All compositions by Freddie Hubbard except as indicated
- Recorded on November 13, 1967 (tracks 1–3) and January 10, 1968 (tracks 4–6)

== Personnel ==
- Freddie Hubbard - trumpet, flugelhorn
- James Spaulding - alto saxophone, flute
- Bennie Maupin - tenor saxophone, flute
- Herbie Lewis - bass
- Roman "Dog" Broadus - conga
- Weldon Irvine - piano (track 1)
- Kenny Barron - piano (tracks 2–6)
- Freddie Waits - drums (tracks 1–3)
- Louis Hayes - drums (tracks 4–6)
- Howard Johnson - baritone saxophone, tuba (tracks 2–6)
- Kiane Zawadi - trombone, euphonium (tracks 2–6)
