= I'm Tryin' to Get Home =

Studio album by Donald Byrd
- Released: End of February/early March 1965
- Recorded: December 17–18, 1964
- Studio: Van Gelder Studio, Englewood Cliffs, NJ
- Genre: Jazz
- Length: 36:51
- Label: Blue Note; BLP 4188; BST 84188
- Producer: Donald Byrd (#1, 3, 5); Duke Pearson (#2, 4, 6)

Donald Byrd chronology
Up with Donald Byrd (1964)	I'm Tryin' to Get Home (1965)	Mustang! (1966)

I'm Tryin' to Get Home is an album by American trumpeter Donald Byrd featuring performances by Byrd with a large brass section and vocalists recorded in 1964 and released on the Blue Note label in 1965 as BLP 4188.

== Reception ==
The AllMusic review by Scott Yanow awarded the album 2 stars and stated "despite some strong moments, the date (which resulted in no real hits) does not quite reach the heights of A New Perspective although it has plenty of interesting moments". The Penguin Guide to Jazz noted the album's popularity and its being a precursor of Byrd's further success in the following decade, but described it as "dispensable".

Professional ratings
Review scores
Source	Rating
AllMusic	2/5 stars
The Penguin Guide to Jazz	2/4 stars
The Rolling Stone Jazz Record Guide	3/5 stars

== Track listing ==
All compositions by Donald Byrd except as indicated

1. "Brother Isaac" - 4:54
2. "Noah" (Duke Pearson) - 6:59
3. "I'm Tryin' to Get Home" - 7:01
4. "I've Longed and Searched for My Mother" - 8:35
5. "March Children" (Pearson) - 7:17
6. "Pearly Gates" (Pearson) - 2:05

Recorded on December 17 (#1, 3, 5) & December 18 (#2, 4, 6), 1964.

== Personnel ==
- Donald Byrd - trumpet, flugelhorn
- Joe Ferrante, Jimmy Owens, Ernie Royal, Clark Terry, Snooky Young - trumpet
- Jimmy Cleveland, Henry Coker, J.J. Johnson, Benny Powell - trombone
- Jim Buffington, Bob Northern - French horn
- Don Butterfield - tuba
- Stanley Turrentine - tenor saxophone
- Herbie Hancock - piano
- Freddie Roach - organ
- Grant Green - guitar
- Bob Cranshaw - bass
- Grady Tate - drums
- Duke Pearson - arranger
- Coleridge Perkinson - director, conductor
- Unidentified musicians - percussion
- Unidentified chorus - vocals
