= Autumn Mood =

Studio album by McCoy Tyner
- Released: 1997
- Recorded: February 11 – 12, 1991
- Studio: Clinton Recording Studios, New York City
- Genre: Jazz
- Label: Laserlight

McCoy Tyner chronology
Blue Bossa (1991)	Autumn Mood (1997)	Soliloquy (1991)

Professional ratings
Review scores
Source	Rating
Allmusic	3/5 stars

Autumn Mood is an album by McCoy Tyner that was released by Laserlight in 1997. It was recorded in February 1991 and features performances by Tyner with Avery Sharpe, Aaron Scott, Raphael Cruz, and Claudio Roditi recorded for LRC. The album combines two tracks which appeared on Blue Bossa with three performances first released on an LRC album with other tracks by Roland Hanna. The Allmusic review by Scott Yanow calls the album "A good but not essential outing".

== Track listing ==
All compositions by McCoy Tyner except where indicated

1. "The Natural Bridge" (Claudio Roditi) – 8:17
2. "Traces" – 8:33
3. "The Monster and the Flower" (Roditi, Ricardo Silveira) – 7:00
4. "Up, Jump, Spring" (Freddie Hubbard) – 7:19
5. "Autumn Mood" (Roditi) – 6:25

== Personnel ==
- McCoy Tyner – piano
- Claudio Roditi – trumpet, flugelhorn
- Avery Sharpe – bass
- Aaron Scott – drums
- Raphael Cruz – percussion
