= Blue Bossa (McCoy Tyner album) =

Studio album by McCoy Tyner
- Released: 1991
- Recorded: February 11–12, 1991
- Studio: Clinton Recording Studios, New York City, NY
- Genre: Jazz
- Label: LRC
- Producer: Dan Lester

McCoy Tyner chronology
One on One (1990)	Blue Bossa (1991)	Autumn Mood (1997)

Professional ratings
Review scores
Source	Rating
AllMusic	2.5/5 stars

Blue Bossa is a 1991 album by McCoy Tyner released on the LRC label. It was recorded in February 1991 and features performances by Tyner with bassist Avery Sharpe, drummer Aaron Scott, percussionist Raphael Cruz and trumpeter Claudio Roditi. The Allmusic review by Ken Dryden states "Although Tyner is in top form throughout, this is not an important release in his considerable discography, but its low price makes it worth acquiring".

== Track listing ==
All compositions by McCoy Tyner except where noted.

1. "Blue Bossa" (Kenny Dorham) – 9:57
2. "Recife's Blues" (Claudio Roditi) – 5:49
3. "I'll Take Romance" (Oscar Hammerstein II, Ben Oakland) – 7:45
4. "Rotunda" – 6:49
5. "We'll Be Together Again" (Carl T. Fischer, Frankie Laine) – 8:21
6. "The Natural Bridge" (Roditi) – 8:17
7. "Traces" – 8:33

== Personnel ==
- McCoy Tyner – piano
- Claudio Roditi – trumpet, flugelhorn
- Avery Sharpe – bass
- Aaron Scott – drums
- Raphael Cruz – percussion
