= Cosmos (McCoy Tyner album) =

Studio album by McCoy Tyner
- Released: July 1976
- Recorded: November 22, 1968; April 4, 1969 and July 21, 1970
- Studio: Van Gelder Studio, Englewood Cliffs, NJ
- Genre: Jazz
- Length: 79:51
- Label: Blue Note; BN-LA460-H2
- Producer: Duke Pearson

McCoy Tyner chronology
Extensions (1970)	Cosmos (1976)	Asante (1970)

Cosmos is a double LP by jazz pianist McCoy Tyner released on the Blue Note label in July 1976. It contains material recorded in November 1968, April 1969 and July 1970 and features two trio performances by Tyner with bassist Herbie Lewis and drummer Freddie Waits, three performances with a larger group featuring saxophonists Harold Vick and Al Gibbons with a string quartet, and three performances as a sextet with flautist Hubert Laws and saxophonists Andrew White and Gary Bartz. The full album is only available on CD on the Mosaic Select 25: McCoy Tyner box set, but the three tracks from the July 21, 1970 sextet recording session also appear on the CD release of Asante.

== Reception ==
Professional ratings
Review scores
Source	Rating
AllMusic	4/5 stars
The Rolling Stone Jazz Record Guide	3/5 stars

The AllMusic review by Scott Yanow states, "the quality of the performances are consistently high ... and the music is consistently intriguing."

== Track listing ==
Side One

1. "Song for My Lady" – 7:30
2. "Cosmos" – 9:00

Side Two

1. "Shaken, But Not Forsaken" – 11:30
2. "Vibration Blues" – 8:40

Side Three

1. "Forbidden Land" – 13:50
2. "Planet X" – 7:40

Side Four

1. "Asian Lullaby" – 7:27
2. "Hope" – 14:14

All compositions by McCoy Tyner

- Recorded on November 22, 1968 (Side Three track 2), April 4, 1969 (Side One & Side Two) and July 21, 1970 (Side Three track 1 & Side Four)

== Personnel ==
- McCoy Tyner – piano
- Herbie Lewis – bass
- Freddie Waits – drums, timpani, chimes
- Harold Vick – soprano saxophone (Side One tracks 1–2, Side Two track 1)
- Al Gibbons – reeds (Side One tracks 1–2, Side Two track 1)
- Julian Barber – violin (Side One tracks 1–2, Side Two track 1)
- Emanuel Green – violin (Side One tracks 1–2, Side Two track 1)
- Gene Orloff – viola (Side One tracks 1–2, Side Two track 1)
- Kermit Moore – cello, director (Side One tracks 1–2, Side Two track 1)
- Hubert Laws – flute, alto flute (Side Three track 1, Side Four track 1–2)
- Gary Bartz – alto saxophone, soprano saxophone (Side Three track 1, Side Four track 1–2)
- Andrew White – oboe (Side Three track 1, Side Four track 1–2)

== See also ==
- McCoy Tyner discography
