= Blues for Coltrane: A Tribute to John Coltrane =

Blues for Coltrane

Studio album by McCoy Tyner
- Released: 1988
- Recorded: July 9, 1987
- Genre: Jazz
- Label: Impulse!

McCoy Tyner chronology
Bon Voyage (1986)	Blues for Coltrane (1988)	Live at the Musicians Exchange Cafe (1987)

Professional ratings
Review scores
Source	Rating
Allmusic	4.5/5 stars

Blues for Coltrane: A Tribute to John Coltrane is a 1987 album by jazz pianist McCoy Tyner released on the Impulse! label. It features performances by Tyner, tenor saxophonists David Murray and Pharoah Sanders, bassist Cecil McBee and drummer Roy Haynes. The album received a Grammy Award for Best Jazz Instrumental Performance in 1988.

== Track listing ==
1. "Bluesin' For John C." (Tyner)
2. "Naima" (Coltrane)
3. "The Promise" (Coltrane)
4. "Lazy Bird" (Coltrane)
5. "I Want to Talk About You" (Eckstine)
6. "Last of the Hipmen" (Murray)
7. "Trane" Bonus track on CD
- Recorded July 9, 1987

== Personnel ==
- McCoy Tyner – piano
- David Murray – tenor saxophone
- Pharoah Sanders – tenor saxophone
- Cecil McBee – bass
- Roy Haynes – drums
