= Love & Peace (Elvin Jones-McCoy Tyner Quintet album) =

Studio album by Elvin Jones-McCoy Tyner Quintet
- Released: 1982
- Recorded: April 13–14, 1982
- Studio: Van Gelder, Englewood Cliffs, NJ
- Genre: Jazz
- Length: 36:42
- Label: Trio, AMJ
- Producer: Elvin Jones, Keiko Jones

Elvin Jones chronology
Earth Jones (1982)	Love & Peace (1982)	Brother John (1982)

McCoy Tyner chronology
Looking Out (1982)	Love & Peace (1982)	Dimensions (1984)

Reunited Cover

Love & Peace (also released as Reunited) is an album by the Elvin Jones-McCoy Tyner Quintet, released in 1982 on the Japanese Trio label. It was recorded in April 1982 and features performances by Jones and Tyner with Pharoah Sanders, Jean-Paul Bourelly and Richard Davis.

== Reception ==
Professional ratings
Review scores
Source	Rating
AllMusic	4.5/5 stars
The Penguin Guide to Jazz Recordings	3/4 stars

According to the AllMusic review by Scott Yanow, the album is "an interesting but not overly memorable outing".

== Track listing ==
1. "Little Rock's Blues" (Sanders) - 4:35
2. "Hip Jones" (Sanders) 7:27
3. "Korina" (Perla) - 5:35
4. "For Tomorrow" (Tyner) - 7:08
5. "Sweet and Lovely" (Arnheim, LeMare, Tobias) - 6:52
6. "Origin" (Sanders) - 5:05
- Recorded at Van Gelder Studio, Englewood Cliffs, NJ, April 13 & 14, 1982

== Personnel ==
- Elvin Jones – drums
- McCoy Tyner – piano
- Pharoah Sanders – tenor saxophone
- Jean-Paul Bourelly – guitar
- Richard Davis – bass
