= Live at the Musicians Exchange Cafe =

Live album by McCoy Tyner
- Released: 1988
- Recorded: July 24 & 25, 1987
- Venue: The Musicians Exchange Cafe, Fort Lauderdale, Florida
- Genre: Jazz
- Label: Who's Who in Jazz

McCoy Tyner chronology
Blues for Coltrane (1988)	Live at the Musicians Exchange Cafe (1988)	Revelations (1988)

What's New? cover

Professional ratings
Review scores
Source	Rating
Allmusic	3/5 stars

Live at the Musicians Exchange Cafe (also released as What's New?, The Real McCoy, and Hip Toe) is a live album by McCoy Tyner released on the Who's Who in Jazz label. It was recorded in July 1987 and features performances by Tyner with Avery Sharpe and Louis Hayes.

== Reception ==
The Allmusic review by Ken Dryden states that "This 1987 live date from a Fort Lauderdale club is worth seeking".

== Track listing ==
1. "Señor Carlos" - 9:13
2. "Lover Man" (Davis, Ramirez, Sherman) - 8:59
3. "You Taught My Heart to Sing" (Cahn, Tyner) - 6:20
4. "Port au Blues" - 7:45
5. "Island Birdie" - 13:02
6. "What's New?" (Burke, Haggart) - 5:26
7. "Hip Toe" - 9:27

All compositions by McCoy Tyner except as indicated
- Recorded at the Musicians Exchange Cafe, Fort Lauderdale on July 24 & 25, 1987.

== Personnel ==
- McCoy Tyner – piano
- Avery Sharpe – bass
- Louis Hayes – drums
