= Double Trios =

Studio album by McCoy Tyner
- Released: 1986
- Recorded: June 7 & 9, 1986
- Genre: Jazz
- Length: 61:20
- Label: Denon
- Producer: Tom Ueno

McCoy Tyner chronology
Just Feelin' (1985)	Double Trios (1986)	Major Changes (1986)

Professional ratings
Review scores
Source	Rating
Allmusic	4.5/5 stars

Double Trios is a 1986 album by jazz pianist McCoy Tyner released on the Denon label. It features performances by Tyner supported by bassist Avery Sharpe and drummer Louis Hayes or bass guitarist Marcus Miller and drummer Jeff "Tain" Watts along with percussionist Steve Thornton. The AllMusic review by Scott Yanow states "it is particularly interesting to hear the pianist's reworkings of 'Lil' Darlin',' 'Satin Doll,' 'Lover Man' and Thelonious Monk's 'Rhythm-A-Ning,' transforming them into modal masterpieces."

== Track listing ==
1. "Latino Suite" - 8:45
2. "Lil' Darlin'" (Hefti) - 7:10
3. "Dreamer" - 7:41
4. "Satin Doll" (Ellington, Mercer, Strayhorn) - 7:10
5. "Down Home" - 8:44
6. "Sudan" (Miller) - 8:52
7. "Lover Man" (Davis, Ramirez, Sherman) - 8:45
8. "Rhythm-A-Ning" (Monk) - 4:32

All compositions by McCoy Tyner except as indicated

- Recorded at Clinton Studio, New York, NY, June 7 (tracks 1–4) & 9 (tracks 5–8), 1986

== Personnel ==
- McCoy Tyner – piano
- Avery Sharpe – bass (tracks 1–4)
- Louis Hayes – drums (tracks 1–4)
- Marcus Miller – electric bass (tracks 5–8)
- Jeff "Tain" Watts – drums (tracks 5–8)
- Steve Thornton – percussion (tracks 1, 3, 5–7)
