= Remembering John =

Studio album by McCoy Tyner
- Released: 1991
- Recorded: February 27 & 28, 1991
- Genre: Jazz
- Label: Enja

McCoy Tyner chronology
Soliloquy (1991)	Remembering John (1991)	New York Reunion (1991)

Alternative cover

Professional ratings
Review scores
Source	Rating
AllMusic	4/5 stars

Remembering John is a 1991 album by McCoy Tyner released on the Enja label. It was recorded in February 1991 and features performances by Tyner with bassist Avery Sharpe and drummer Aaron Scott paying tribute to John Coltrane. The AllMusic review by Scott Yanow states that "McCoy Tyner still sounds enthusiastic and adventurous performing the timeless music".

== Track listing ==
1. "India" (Coltrane) - 6:57
2. "Giant Steps" (Coltrane) - 2:26
3. "In Walked Bud" (Monk) - 6:50
4. "Like Someone in Love" (Burke, Van Heusen) - 7:40
5. "One and Four" (Coltrane) - 5:11
6. "Up 'Gainst the Wall" (Coltrane) 7:27
7. "Good Morning Heartache" (Drake, Fisher, Higginbotham) - 5:46
8. "Pursuance" (Coltrane) - 5:48
9. "The Wise One" (Coltrane) - 9:36

- Recorded at Clinton Recording Studios, New York City, New York, on February 27 & 28, 1991.

== Personnel ==
- McCoy Tyner - piano
- Avery Sharpe - bass
- Aaron Scott - drums
