= Passion Dance =

Live album by McCoy Tyner
- Released: 1978
- Recorded: July 28, 1978
- Venue: Live Under the Sky
- Genre: Jazz
- Label: Milestone
- Producer: Orrin Keepnews

McCoy Tyner chronology
The Greeting (1978)	Passion Dance (1978)	Counterpoints (2004)

Professional ratings
Review scores
Source	Rating
AllMusic	4/5 stars
The Rolling Stone Jazz Record Guide	4/5 stars
DownBeat	4.5/5 stars

Passion Dance is a 1978 live album by the jazz pianist McCoy Tyner, his fourteenth release on the Milestone label. It was recorded in July 1978 at the Live Under the Sky festival in Tokyo, Japan and features predominantly solo performances by Tyner, with two tracks including drummer Tony Williams and bassist Ron Carter. A second album from this concert, Counterpoints, was released in 2004.

== Reception ==
The AllMusic review by Scott Yanow states "All of Tyner's Milestone records of the 1970s are recommended and this is one of the better ones".

DownBeat assigned the album 4.5 stars. Reviewer Sam Freedman wrote, "What raises Passion Dance above Tyner’s constant four star plane, placing it among his finest work, is the unity of its wordless vision. Tyner has tempered his personal statements . . . Passion Dance, in contrast, completes a trinity of probing, sorrowful offerings begun by Sahara and Trident. Musically, Tyner’s shrapnel-sharp style pushes to the limits of chaos. Personally, his world view—Sahara's urban netherworld, Trident's gloomy sea—pushes to the brink of grief. Deliberation and resolve, the dominant emotions of Passion Dances title song, constitute Tyner's sunny side".

== Track listing ==
1. "Moment's Notice" (Coltrane) – 9:23
2. "Passion Dance" – 11:47
3. "Search for Peace" – 6:36
4. "The Promise" (Coltrane) – 6:28
5. "Song of the New World" – 7:12

All compositions by McCoy Tyner except as indicated
- Recorded at "Live Under The Sky", Denen Colosseum, Tokyo, Japan, July 28, 1978

== Personnel ==
- McCoy Tyner – piano
- Ron Carter – bass (tracks 1 & 5)
- Tony Williams – drums (tracks 1 & 5)
