= 44th Street Suite =

Studio album by McCoy Tyner
- Released: 1991
- Recorded: May 11, 1991
- Genre: Jazz
- Label: Red Baron
- Producer: Bob Thiele

McCoy Tyner chronology
New York Reunion (1991)	44th Street Suite (1991)	Solar: Live at Sweet Basil (1991)

44th Street Suite is a 1991 album by McCoy Tyner released on the Red Baron label. It was recorded in May 1991 and features performances by Tyner with tenor saxophonist David Murray, alto saxophonist Arthur Blythe, bassist Ron Carter, and drummer Aaron Scott.

== Critical reception ==
Professional ratings
Review scores
Source	Rating
Allmusic	3/5 stars

In his 1992 review for the Chicago Tribune, journalist Jack Fuller called the group's approach "simple and direct" and the horn players "as good as I've heard either of them". The AllMusic review by Scott Yanow states that "Little all that memorable occurs considering the players involved (a little more planning would have worked wonders) but the music does have its exciting moments."

== Track listing ==
No.	Title	Writer(s)	Length
1.	"Bessie's Blues"	Coltrane	5:50
2.	"Blue Piano"	Ellington, Thiele, Roberts, Katz	6:15
3.	"Not for Beginners"	Tyner	6:41
4.	"Falling in Love with Love"	Rogers, Hart	7:01
5.	"44th Street Suite – Part I"	Tyner, Blythe, Carter	6:39
6.	"44th Street Suite – Part II"	Tyner, Blythe, Carter	10:24

- Recorded May 11, 1991

== Personnel ==
- McCoy Tyner - piano
- David Murray - tenor saxophone (tracks 1–4)
- Arthur Blythe - alto saxophone (tracks 1–3, 5–6)
- Ron Carter - bass
- Aaron Scott - drums
