= Tender Moments =

Studio album by McCoy Tyner
- Released: September 1968
- Recorded: December 1, 1967
- Studio: Van Gelder Studio, Englewood Cliffs
- Genre: Jazz, post-bop, modal jazz
- Length: 38:00
- Label: Blue Note BST 84275
- Producer: Francis Wolff

McCoy Tyner chronology
The Real McCoy (1967)	Tender Moments (1968)	Time for Tyner (1968)

Professional ratings
Review scores
Source	Rating
Allmusic	4.5/5 stars
DownBeat	3/5 stars
Penguin Guide to Jazz	3/4 stars
The Rolling Stone Jazz Record Guide	3/5 stars

Tender Moments is the eighth album by jazz pianist McCoy Tyner and his second released on the Blue Note label. It was recorded in December 1967 and features performances by Tyner with an expanded group featuring trumpeter Lee Morgan, trombonist Julian Priester, French horn player Bob Northern, tuba player Howard Johnson, alto saxophonist James Spaulding, tenor saxophonist Bennie Maupin, bassist Herbie Lewis and drummer Joe Chambers.

== Reception ==
The Allmusic review by Scott Yanow states that "the music is quite colorful and advanced for the period. Well worth investigating".

== Track listing ==
1. "Mode to John" - 5:42
2. "Man from Tanganyika" - 6:54
3. "The High Priest" - 6:08
4. "Utopia" - 7:37
5. "All My Yesterdays" - 6:04
6. "Lee Plus Three" - 5:35

All compositions by McCoy Tyner

== Personnel ==
- McCoy Tyner - piano
- Lee Morgan - trumpet
- Herbie Lewis - bass
- Joe Chambers - drums
- Julian Priester - trombone (except “Lee Plus Three”)
- Bob Northern - french horn (except “Lee Plus Three”)
- Howard Johnson - tuba (except “Lee Plus Three”)
- James Spaulding - alto saxophone, flute (except “Lee Plus Three”)
- Bennie Maupin - tenor saxophone (except “Lee Plus Three”)
