= Live Under the Sky (festival) =

Jazz festival

Live Under the Sky was an annual jazz festival held in summer, July and August, at the Denen Coliseum and Yomiuriland in Tokyo and other areas in Japan. The multiple day festival featured musicians from Japan and other countries performing on different stages. It was held from 1977 – 1992.

Live Under the Sky, Newport Jazz Festival in Madarao (established in 1982) and Mount Fuji Jazz Festival (established in 1986) are the big three jazz festivals in the history of jazz in Japan.

== Notable artists ==
Notable artists at Live Under the Sky were Buzz Feiten, Kimiko Kasai, "V.S.O.P." quintet, Pedro Aznar, Masahiko Togashi, Terumasa Hino, Sadao Watanabe, McCoy Tyner, Ron Carter, Elis Regina, Chick Corea, John McLaughlin, Stanley Clarke and Larry Graham in 1985, Toshiyuki Honda, Sonny Rollins, Paco de Lucía, Carlos Santana, and David Margen in 1981, Weather Report, The Crusaders, Gil Evans, Jaco Pastorius, Black Uhuru, Sly and Robbie, Miles Davis, John Scofield, Roberta Flack, Al Di Meola, Branford Marsalis, Ornette Coleman, Miles Davis, Ryuichi Sakamoto, Samul nori, Wayne Shorter, Jack DeJohnette, Kazumi Watanabe, Eugene Pao, Eddie Gómez, Marlon Jordan, Pat Metheny, Lyle Mays, David Sanborn, Don Alias, Sun Ra, Marshall Allen, Danny Thompson, Billy Bang, Marilyn Mazur, Michael Brecker, Mike Stern, Leon "Ndugu" Chancler, Don Grolnick, Yoshio Suzuki, Gunther Schuller, Roberta Flack, Masahiko Satoh, Alex Acuna, Nana Vasconcelos, Kazutoki Umezu, Al Jarreau, Philippe Saisse, Steve Gadd, Michel Godard, Milton Nascimento, Omar Hakim, Marcus Miller, Lalah Hathaway, Dean Brown, Everette Harp, Larry Coryell, Billy Cobham, Paul Wertico, Harold Smiley Davis.

== Related recordings ==
- Live Under the Sky, 1978 double album by Galaxy All-Stars in Tokyo, including Red Garland, Hank Jones, Roy Haynes and others
- McCoy Tyner, Passion Dance – rec. July 28, 1978
- McCoy Tyner, Counterpoints – rec. July 28, 1978
- Ron Carter, 1 + 3 – rec. July 29, 1978
- Ron Carter, Hank Jones, Sadao Watanabe, Tony Williams, Carnaval – rec. July 30, 1978
- V.S.O.P. Live Under the Sky, 1979 album by V.S.O.P. Quintet rereleased in 2004
- Live Under the Sky Tokyo '84, album by Gil Evans and Jaco Pastorius
- Wayne Shorter, Dave Liebman, et al., Tribute to John Coltrane - Live Under the Sky, 1987
- Masahiko Satoh/Randooga, with Wayne Shorter, Select Live Under the Sky '90
- Live Under the Sky Tokyo '92
