= Things Ain't What They Used to Be (McCoy Tyner album) =

1990 live album by McCoy Tyner

Live album by McCoy Tyner
- Released: April 1990
- Recorded: November 2, 1989 (solos); November 27, 1989 (duets)
- Venue: Kaufman Music Center, NYC
- Genre: Jazz
- Label: Blue Note

McCoy Tyner chronology
Live at Sweet Basil (1987)	Things Ain't What They Used to Be (1990)	One on One (1990)

Professional ratings
Review scores
Source	Rating
Allmusic	4/5 stars

Things Ain't What They Used to Be is an album by McCoy Tyner released on the Blue Note label. Like Revelations (1987), it was recorded at Merkin Hall and features solo performances by Tyner, in addition he performs three duets with guitarist John Scofield and two with tenor saxophonist George Adams. The AllMusic review by Scott Yanow states that "the pianist makes every melody sound like a fresh original through his distinctive chord voicings and harmonies. This is a strong effort by one of the best."

== Track listing ==
1. "The Greeting" - 2:26
2. "Naima" (Coltrane) - 3:42
3. "I Mean You" (Hawkins, Monk) - 4:57
4. "Here's That Rainy Day" (Burke, Van Heusen) - 6:02
5. "Things Ain't What They Used to Be" (Ellington, Persons) - 3:52
6. "Joy Spring" (Brown) - 4:21
7. "Lush Life" (Strayhorn) - 5:34 Bonus track on CD
8. "Song for My Lady" - 6:28 Bonus track on CD
9. "Sweet and Lovely" (Arnheim, LeMare, Tobias) - 3:56 Bonus track on CD
10. "What's New?" (Burke, Haggart) - 3:53
11. "Search for Peace" - 6:09
12. "Blues on the Corner" - 6:25
13. "My One and Only Love" (Mellin, Wood) - 8:00

All compositions by McCoy Tyner except as indicated
- Recorded at Merkin Hall, NYC, November 2, 1989 (solos), and November 27, 1989 (duets)

== Personnel ==
- McCoy Tyner – piano
- John Scofield – guitar (tracks 3, 4, 6)
- George Adams – tenor saxophone (tracks 12 & 13)
