= The Greeting =

Live album by McCoy Tyner
- Released: 1978
- Recorded: March 17 & 18, 1978
- Venue: Great American Music Hall
- Genre: Jazz
- Label: Milestone
- Producer: Orrin Keepnews

McCoy Tyner chronology
Inner Voices (1977)	The Greeting (1978)	Passion Dance (1978)

Professional ratings
Review scores
Source	Rating
Allmusic	4/5 stars
The Rolling Stone Jazz Record Guide	3/5 stars

The Greeting is a 1978 live album by jazz pianist McCoy Tyner, his thirteenth release on the Milestone label. It was recorded in March 1978 at the Great American Music Hall and features performances by Tyner with a sextet featuring tenor saxophonist George Adams, alto saxophonist Joe Ford, bassist Charles Fambrough, drummer Woody Theus and percussionist Guilherme Franco. Tyner's performance of John Coltrane's "Naima" is a piano solo.

== Reception ==
The Allmusic review by Scott Yanow calls the album "One of the better McCoy Tyner records on Milestone... An excellent example of McCoy Tyner's playing in the 1970s".

== Track listing ==
1. "Hand in Hand" - 6:18
2. "Fly with the Wind" - 14:54
3. "Pictures" - 7:57
4. "Naima" (Coltrane) - 4:44
5. "The Greeting" - 8:55

All compositions by McCoy Tyner except as indicated
- Recorded at the Great American Music Hall, San Francisco, CA, March 17 & 18, 1978

== Personnel ==
- McCoy Tyner – piano
- Joe Ford – alto saxophone, flute (tracks 1–3 & 5)
- George Adams – tenor saxophone, soprano saxophone, flute (tracks 1–3 & 5)
- Charles Fambrough – bass (tracks 1–3 & 5)
- Woody "Sonship" Theus – drums, bells (tracks 1–3 & 5)
- Guilherme Franco – conga, berimbau, percussion (tracks 1–3 & 5)
