= Song for My Lady =

Studio album by McCoy Tyner
- Released: February 1973
- Recorded: September 6 and November 27, 1972
- Studio: Mercury Sound Studios, New York City
- Genre: Jazz
- Length: 44:44
- Label: Milestone; MSP 9044
- Producer: Orrin Keepnews

McCoy Tyner chronology
Echoes of a Friend (1972)	Song for My Lady (1973)	Song of the New World (1973)

Professional ratings
Review scores
Source	Rating
AllMusic	4/5 stars
The Rolling Stone Jazz Record Guide	4/5 stars
The Penguin Guide to Jazz Recordings	3/4 stars

Song for My Lady is a 1973 album by jazz pianist McCoy Tyner, his third to be released on the Milestone label. It was recorded in September and November 1972 and features performances by Tyner with saxophonist Sonny Fortune, bassist Calvin Hill, drummer Alphonse Mouzon with trumpeter Charles Tolliver, violinist Michael White and percussionist Mtume joining in on two tracks.

== Reception ==
The Allmusic review by Eugene Chadbourne states: "This is quite a fine collection of tracks and one of Tyner's six best albums."

== Track listing ==
All compositions by McCoy Tyner except as indicated

1. "Native Song" - 13:00
2. "The Night Has a Thousand Eyes" (Bernier, Brainin) - 8:17
3. "Song for My Lady" - 7:37
4. "A Silent Tear" - 4:30
5. "Essence" - 11:20

Tracks 1 and 5 recorded on September 6, 1972; 2, 3 and 4 on November 27, 1972.

== Personnel ==
- McCoy Tyner - piano, percussion
- Sonny Fortune - alto saxophone, soprano saxophone, flute
- Calvin Hill - bass
- Alphonse Mouzon - drums
- Michael White - violin (tracks 1 & 5)
- Charles Tolliver - flugelhorn (tracks 1 & 5)
- Mtume - congas, percussion (tracks 1 & 5)
