= Asante (album) =

Studio album by McCoy Tyner
- Released: April 1974
- Recorded: September 10, 1970
- Studio: Van Gelder Studio, Englewood Cliffs, NJ
- Genre: Jazz
- Length: 41:53
- Label: Blue Note; BN-LA 223-G
- Producer: Duke Pearson

McCoy Tyner chronology
Cosmos (1970)	Asante (1974)	Sahara (1972)

Professional ratings
Review scores
Source	Rating
Allmusic	4/5 stars
The Rolling Stone Jazz Record Guide	4/5 stars
The Penguin Guide to Jazz Recordings	3/4 stars

Asante is an album by jazz pianist McCoy Tyner released on the Blue Note label. It was recorded in 1970 and features performances by Tyner with alto saxophonist Andrew White, guitarist Ted Dunbar, bassist Buster Williams, drummer Billy Hart, percussionist Mtume and vocalist "Songai" Sandra Smith appearing on two tracks.

The AllMusic review by Scott Yanow states, "Asante is a bit unusual for the emphasis is on group interplay rather than individual solos." The CD release adds three tracks that originally appeared on the album Cosmos (1976).

== Track listing ==
All compositions by McCoy Tyner Original LP

1. "Malika" - 14:02
2. "Asante" - 6:12
3. "Goin' Home" - 7:39
4. "Fulfillment" - 14:00

Bonus tracks on CD release from Cosmos, recorded on July 21, 1970

5. "Forbidden Land" - 13:46
6. "Asian Lullaby" - 8:30
7. "Hope" - 14:11

== Personnel ==
- McCoy Tyner - piano, wooden flute
- Andrew White - alto saxophone (tracks 1–4), oboe (tracks 5–7)
- Ted Dunbar - guitar (tracks 1–4)
- Buster Williams - bass (tracks 1–4)
- Billy Hart - drums, African percussion (tracks 1–4)
- Mtume - congas, percussion (tracks 1–4)
- "Songai" Sandra Smith - vocals (tracks 1–2)
- Herbie Lewis - bass (tracks 5–7)
- Freddie Waits - drums, timpani, chimes (tracks 5–7)
- Hubert Laws - flute, alto flute (tracks 5–7)
- Gary Bartz - alto sax, soprano sax (tracks 5–7)

== Charts ==
Chart performance for Asante
Chart (2026)	Peak position
UK Jazz & Blues Albums (OCC)	19
