= McCoy Tyner Plays John Coltrane: Live at the Village Vanguard =

McCoy Tyner Plays John Coltrane

Live album by McCoy Tyner
- Released: October 16, 2001
- Recorded: September 23, 1997
- Venue: Village Vanguard, New York City
- Genre: Jazz
- Label: Impulse!
- Producer: Jim Anderson

McCoy Tyner chronology
What the World Needs Now (1997)	McCoy Tyner Plays John Coltrane (2001)	McCoy Tyner and the Latin All-Stars (1998)

Professional ratings
Review scores
Source	Rating
Allmusic	3.5/5 stars
The Penguin Guide to Jazz Recordings	3/4 stars

McCoy Tyner Plays John Coltrane: Live at the Village Vanguard is a live album by McCoy Tyner released on the Impulse! label in 2001. It was recorded in September 1997 at the Village Vanguard in New York City and features performances by Tyner with bassist George Mraz and drummer Al Foster. The repertoire features compositions by John Coltrane and two others which his Quartet performed. The Allmusic review by Jonathan Widran states: "The show on September 23, 1997, was to celebrate Coltrane's 71st birthday, and this recording brings listeners so joyfully close that they can almost blow out the candles themselves". The music was recorded directly to a 2-track analogue tape with no mixing or editing.

== Track listing ==
All compositions by John Coltrane, except where noted.

1. "Naima" - 12:17
2. "Moment's Notice" - 7:07
3. "Crescent" - 12:27
4. "After the Rain" - 3:46
5. "Afro Blue" (Mongo Santamaría) - 12:18
6. "I Want to Talk About You" (Billy Eckstine) - 11:08
7. "Mr. Day" - 7:20

== Personnel ==
- McCoy Tyner - piano
- George Mraz - bass
- Al Foster - drums
