= Bob Northern =

American jazz musician (1934–2020)

- Birth name: Robert Northern
- Born: 21 May 1934; Kinston, North Carolina
- Died: 31 May 2020
- Genres: Avant-garde jazz, jazz fusion
- Occupation: French hornist
- Instrument: French horn

Robert Northern (May 21, 1934 – May 31, 2020), known professionally as Brother Ah, was an American jazz French hornist.

== Life and career ==
Born in 1934 in Kinston, North Carolina and raised in The Bronx, Northern studied at the Manhattan School of Music and at the Vienna Academy in the 1950s. He was perhaps best known as a session musician, working extensively in the 1950s and 1960s with musicians such as Donald Byrd, John Coltrane, Gil Evans, Sun Ra, McCoy Tyner, Roland Kirk, and the Jazz Composers Orchestra. He also worked with Don Cherry, Thelonious Monk, Freddie Hubbard, Miles Davis, Dizzy Gillespie, Eric Dolphy, Charlie Haden, and John Lewis.

He lived in New York City from 1963 to 1971, and after a period of increasing interest in non-Western music, visited and studied in Africa (Ghana, Kenya and Tanzania) during seven consecutive summers (1972 -1977). In the 1970s he released several albums as a bandleader; his 1974 release Sound Awareness featured Max Roach and M'Boom. These albums were reissued on CD on the Ikef Records label in the 2000s. In addition to horn playing, Northern also branched into percussion and flute performance later in his career. He taught at Dartmouth College from 1970 to 1973, Brown University from 1973 to 1982 and then at the Levine School of Music in Washington, D.C. from 1982. Northern was also the founder of the World Music Ensemble, a group which explores African, Japanese, Spanish, East Indian, Native American and American musical traditions and the founder of The Sounds of Awareness Ensemble which explores the sounds of nature and music. Northern, as Brother Ah, hosted a weekly jazz oriented radio program, The Jazz Collectors, on station WPFW in Washington.

Bob Northern died in Washington on May 31, 2020, aged 86, of a respiratory illness that he had been battling for in that year.

== Discography ==
=== As leader ===
- Sound Awareness (Strata-East, 1974)
- Move Ever Onward (Divine, 1975)
- Key to Nowhere (Divine, 1983)
- Celebration (Mapleshade, 1993)
- Open Sky (Divine, 1986)

=== As sideman ===
With Donald Byrd

- I'm Tryin' to Get Home (Blue Note, 1964)

With John Coltrane

- Africa/Brass (Impulse!, 1961)
- The Africa/Brass Sessions, Volume 2 (Impulse!, 1961)

With Gil Evans

- Great Jazz Standards (World Pacific, 1959)
- The Individualism of Gil Evans (Verve 1964)

With Art Farmer

- Brass Shout (United Artists, 1959)
- Listen to Art Farmer and the Orchestra (Mercury, 1962)

With Benny Golson

- Pop + Jazz = Swing (Audio Fidelity, 1961)

With Charlie Haden

- Liberation Music Orchestra (Impulse!, 1969)

With Andrew Hill

- Passing Ships (Blue Note, 1969 [2003])

With Freddie Hubbard

- The Body & the Soul (Impulse!, 1963)

With Milt Jackson

- For Someone I Love (Riverside, 1963)

With the Jazz Composer's Orchestra

- The Jazz Composer's Orchestra (JCOA, 1968)

With J. J. Johnson

- Broadway Express (RCA Victor, 1965)

With Quincy Jones

- Quincy Jones Explores the Music of Henry Mancini (Mercury, 1964)
- Quincy Plays for Pussycats (Mercury, 1959-65 [1965])

With John Lewis

- Essence (Atlantic, 1962)

With Jack McDuff

- Prelude (Prestige, 1963)

With Gary McFarland

- Profiles (Impulse!, 1966)

With Thelonious Monk

- The Thelonious Monk Orchestra at Town Hall (Riverside, 1959)

With Oliver Nelson

- Full Nelson (Verve, 1963)

With Lalo Schifrin

- New Fantasy (Verve, 1964)
- Once a Thief and Other Themes (Verve, 1965)

With Cal Tjader

- Several Shades of Jade (Verve, 1963)

With McCoy Tyner

- Tender Moments (Blue Note, 1967)

With Julius Watkins

- French Horns for My Lady (Philips, 1962)
