= What the World Needs Now: The Music of Burt Bacharach =

What the World Needs Now

Studio album by McCoy Tyner
- Released: June 17, 1997
- Recorded: March 5–6, 1996
- Genre: Jazz
- Length: 52:07
- Label: Impulse!

McCoy Tyner chronology
Infinity (1995)	What the World Needs Now (1997)	McCoy Tyner Plays John Coltrane (2001)

Professional ratings
Review scores
Source	Rating
Allmusic	2/5 stars

What the World Needs Now: The Music of Burt Bacharach is an album by McCoy Tyner released on the Impulse! label in 1997. It was recorded in March 1996 and features performances of Burt Bacharach's compositions by Tyner with bassist Christian McBride, drummer Lewis Nash a string section and orchestra. The Allmusic review by Scott Yanow states that "The pianist treats each melody as if it were precious, and the overall results are rather schlocky".

== Track listing ==
1. "(They Long to Be) Close to You" - 7:51
2. "What the World Needs Now Is Love" - 6:09
3. "You'll Never Get to Heaven (If You Break My Heart)" - 5:04
4. "The Windows of the World" - 5:30
5. "One Less Bell to Answer" - 5:39
6. "A House is Not a Home" - 5:36
7. "(There's) Always Something There to Remind Me" - 4:43
8. "Alfie" - 4:26
9. "The Look of Love - 7:10

All compositions by Burt Bacharach
- Recorded at The Hit Factory, NYC, March 5 & 6, 1996

== Personnel ==
- McCoy Tyner - piano
- Christian McBride - bass
- Lewis Nash - drums]
- John Clayton - arranger, conductor
