= Just Feelin' =

Studio album by McCoy Tyner
- Released: 1985
- Recorded: 1985
- Genre: Jazz
- Label: Palo Alto
- Producer: Herb Wong

McCoy Tyner chronology
It's About Time (1985)	Just Feelin' (1985)	Double Trios (1986)

Alternative cover

Professional ratings
Review scores
Source	Rating
Allmusic	4/5 stars

Just Feelin' is a 1985 album by jazz pianist McCoy Tyner originally released on the Palo Alto label. It features performances by Tyner with his trio featuring bassist Avery Sharpe and drummer Louis Hayes along with percussionist Babatunde Lea.

== Reception ==
The Allmusic review by Scott Yanow states: "The project served as the real beginning of Tyner's current conservative but still lively music in which his formerly avant-garde style became very much a part of the jazz tradition. Worth searching for".

== Track listing ==
1. "Just Feelin'" (McCoy Tyner) - 9:30
2. "I Didn't Know What Time It Was" (Hart, Rodgers) - 7:46
3. "Blues for Basie" (McCoy Tyner) - 6:50
4. "Berliner" (Avery Sharpe) - 5:46
5. "You Don't Know What Love Is" (DePaul, Raye) - 3:40
6. "There Is No Greater Love" (Jones, Symes) - 8:07
7. "Manha de Carnaval" (Bonfá, Jobim) - 9:36

- Recorded at Recorded at Coast Recorders, San Francisco, California, in 1985

== Personnel ==
- McCoy Tyner – piano
- Avery Sharpe – bass
- Louis Hayes – drums
- Babatunde Lea – percussion
