= Counterpoints (McCoy Tyner album) =

Live album by McCoy Tyner
- Released: September 24, 2004
- Recorded: July 28, 1978
- Venue: Live Under the Sky
- Genre: Jazz
- Label: Milestone
- Producer: Orrin Keepnews

McCoy Tyner chronology
Passion Dance (1978)	Counterpoints (2004)	Together (1978)

Professional ratings
Review scores
Source	Rating
Allmusic	4/5 stars
The Penguin Guide to Jazz Recordings	3/4 stars

Counterpoints: Live in Tokyo is a live album by jazz pianist McCoy Tyner released in the Milestone label in 2004. It was recorded, along with Passion Dance (1978), in July 1978 at the Live Under the Sky festival in Tokyo, Japan and features performances by Tyner with drummer Tony Williams and bassist Ron Carter.

== Reception ==
The Allmusic review by Ken Dryden states "Even with Tyner's fierce attack at the keyboard and his heavy use of the sustain pedal at times, the sound is remarkably clear".

== Track listing ==
1. "The Greeting" – 11:30
2. "Aisha" – 7:08
3. "Sama Layuca" – 6:38
4. "Prelude to a Kiss" (Ellington, Gordon, Mills) – 9:20
5. "Iki Masho (Let's Go)" – 13:58

All compositions by McCoy Tyner except as indicated

- Recorded at "Live Under The Sky", Denen Colosseum, Tokyo, Japan, July 28, 1978

== Personnel ==
- McCoy Tyner – piano
- Ron Carter – bass (tracks 1, 4 & 5)
- Tony Williams – drums
