= Key of Soul =

Live album by McCoy Tyner
- Released: September 1992
- Recorded: June 14, 1991
- Venue: The Sweet Basil, NYC
- Genre: Jazz
- Label: Alfa

McCoy Tyner chronology
Solar: Live at Sweet Basil (1991)	Key of Soul (1992)	Live in Warsaw (1991)

Key of Soul is a live album by McCoy Tyner released on the Japanese Alfa label. It was recorded in June 1991 at Sweet Basil in New York City and features a live performance by Tyner with bassist Avery Sharpe and drummer Aaron Scott. Another album of this evening's concert was released as Solar: Live at Sweet Basil (1991).

== Track listing ==
1. "I Wanna Stand over There" (Hutcherson) -
2. "Suddenly" -
3. "I Should Care" (Cahn, Stordahl, Weston) -
4. "Miss Bea" -

All compositions by McCoy Tyner except as indicated
- Recorded at Sweet Basil, New York, New York on June 14, 1991

== Personnel ==
- McCoy Tyner – piano
- Avery Sharpe – bass
- Aaron Scott – drums
