= Bon Voyage (McCoy Tyner album) =

Studio album by McCoy Tyner
- Released: 1987
- Recorded: June 9, 1987
- Genre: Jazz
- Length: 54:29
- Label: Timeless
- Producer: Wim Wigt

McCoy Tyner chronology
Major Changes (1986)	Bon Voyage (1987)	Blues for Coltrane (1988)

Professional ratings
Review scores
Source	Rating
Allmusic	3/5 stars

Bon Voyage is a 1987 album by McCoy Tyner released on the Timeless label. It was recorded in June 1987 and features performances by Tyner with bassist Avery Sharpe and drummer Louis Hayes.

== Reception ==
The AllMusic review by Ken Dryden states that although the album is "Not one of McCoy Tyner's better known CDs, this trio session is nevertheless one worth acquiring."

== Track listing ==
1. "Bon Voyage" - 10:27
2. "Summertime" (Gershwin, Gershwin, Heyward) - 6:11
3. "Don't Blame Me" (Fields, McHugh) - 4:31
4. "You Stepped Out of a Dream" (Brown, Kahn) - 8:51
5. "Walk Spirit, Talk Spirit (Listed incorrectly as Jazz Walk)" - 7:41
6. "How Deep Is the Ocean?" (Berlin) - 7:12
7. "Yesterdays" (Harbach, Kern) - 4:57
8. "Blues for Max" - 4:39

All compositions by McCoy Tyner except as indicated

  - Recorded 9 June 1987 in Studio 44, Monster, the Netherlands, .

== Personnel ==
- McCoy Tyner – piano
- Avery Sharpe – electric bass (track 1), bass
- Louis Hayes – drums
