= Extensions (McCoy Tyner album) =

Studio album by McCoy Tyner
- Released: January 1973
- Recorded: February 9, 1970
- Studios: Van Gelder Studio, Englewood Cliffs, NJ
- Genres: Jazz, post-bop, modal jazz
- Length: 40:11
- Label: Blue Note BN-LA 006-F
- Producer: Duke Pearson

McCoy Tyner chronology
Expansions (1968)	Extensions (1973)	Cosmos (1970)

Professional ratings
Review scores
Source	Rating
Allmusic	4.5/5 stars
The Rolling Stone Jazz Record Guide	4/5 stars

Extensions is the eleventh album by jazz pianist McCoy Tyner, released on the Blue Note label. It was recorded on February 9, 1970, but not released until January 1973. It has performances by Tyner with alto saxophonist Gary Bartz, tenor saxophonist Wayne Shorter, bassist Ron Carter, drummer Elvin Jones, and features Alice Coltrane playing harp on three of the four tracks.

== Reception ==
In his AllMusic review Scott Yanow says, "The all-star sextet stretches out on lengthy renditions of four of Tyner's modal originals, and there is strong solo space for the leader and the two saxophonists... Stimulating music".

Reviewing the album for jazz.com, Jared Pauley says, "McCoy Tyner finds himself among elite company on Extensions. Recorded as jazz was entering the fusion period, this is a great example of just how good straight-ahead swing can sound... This performance matches the superb quality of previous Shorter and Tyner albums where members of the Davis and Coltrane groups recorded together."

== Track listing ==
1. "Message from the Nile" - 12:22
2. "The Wanderer" - 7:43
3. "Survival Blues" - 13:15
4. "His Blessings" - 6:50

All compositions written by McCoy Tyner.

== Personnel ==
=== Musicians ===
- McCoy Tyner – piano
- Gary Bartz – alto saxophone
- Wayne Shorter – tenor saxophone, soprano saxophone
- Ron Carter – bass
- Elvin Jones – drums
- Alice Coltrane – harp (tracks 1, 3 & 4)

=== Production ===
- Producer – Duke Pearson
- Recorded by – Rudy Van Gelder
- Liner notes – André Perry
- Cover photography – Clifford Janoff
