= Dimensions (McCoy Tyner album) =

Studio album by McCoy Tyner
- Released: 1984
- Recorded: October 1983
- Genre: Jazz
- Label: Elektra/Musician
- Producer: McCoy Tyner

McCoy Tyner chronology
| Love & Peace (1982) | Dimensions (1984) | It's About Time (1985) |

Professional ratings
Review scores
| Source | Rating |
|---|---|
| Allmusic | 4/5 stars |

Dimensions is a 1984 album by jazz pianist McCoy Tyner released on the Elektra/Musician label. It features performances by Tyner with alto saxophonist Gary Bartz, violinist John Blake, bassist John Lee and drummer Wilby Fletcher. The Allmusic review by Scott Yanow states "McCoy Tyner is featured in one of his strongest groups... A transitional set between Tyner's adventurous Milestone albums and his current repertoire... Excellent music".

== Track listing ==
1. "One for Dea" - 10:01
2. "Prelude to a Kiss" (Ellington, Mills) - 4:00
3. "Precious One" (Blake) - 8:01
4. "Just in Time" (Comden, Green, Styne) - 6:07
5. "Understanding" (Lee) - 9:19
6. "Uncle Bubba" (Bartz) - 5:25

All compositions by McCoy Tyner except as indicated

  - Recorded at Unique Recording Studios, New York, October '83

== Personnel ==
- McCoy Tyner – piano, synthesizer
- Gary Bartz – alto saxophone
- John Blake – violin
- John Lee – bass
- Wilby Fletcher – drums
