= Live in Warsaw (McCoy Tyner album) =

Live album by McCoy Tyner
- Released: 1991
- Recorded: October 24–27, 1991
- Venue: The Warsaw Jazz Jamboree
- Genre: Jazz
- Label: Who's Who in Jazz

McCoy Tyner chronology
Key of Soul (1991)	Live in Warsaw (1991)	The Turning Point (1991)

Beautiful Love cover

Professional ratings
Review scores
Source	Rating
Allmusic	4/5 stars
The Penguin Guide to Jazz Recordings	3/4 stars

Live in Warsaw (also released as Beautiful Love, The Lady from Caracas, Monk's Dream and At the Warsaw Jamboree) is a 1991 live album by McCoy Tyner that was released by Who's Who in Jazz. The album was recorded for a television broadcast by Polish Channel 1 (which has also been released as a DVD) in October 1991 at the Operatka House in Warsaw, Poland with a solo performance by Tyner. The AllMusic review by William Ruhlmann states, "A virtual retrospective on a long career by a still-vital artist, Live in Warsaw offers the listener an opportunity to hear Tyner's mature reflections on the music of his past and present in an unfettered context."

== Track listing ==
1. "Beautiful Love" (Gillespie, King, Van Alstyne, Young) - 3:20
2. "Suddenly" - 5:20
3. "Giant Steps" (Coltrane) - 3:32
4. "Darn That Dream" (DeLange, Van Heusen) - 5:51
5. "Rhythm-A-Ning" (Monk) - 5:56
6. "You Taught My Heart to Sing" (Cahn, Tyner) - 4:55
7. "Bluesin' With Bob" - 4:37
8. "Monk's Dream" (Monk) - 3:39
9. "Naima" (Coltrane) - 4:13
10. "Miss Bea" - 5:56
11. "Rio" - 4:14
12. "Lady from Caracas" - 4:15

All compositions by McCoy Tyner except as indicated
- Recorded at the Operatka House, Warsaw, Poland on October 24–27, 1991.

== Personnel ==
- McCoy Tyner - piano
