= One on One (Stéphane Grappelli and McCoy Tyner album) =

Studio album by Stéphane Grappelli & McCoy Tyner
- Released: 1990
- Recorded: April 18, 1990
- Genre: Jazz
- Label: Milestone

McCoy Tyner chronology
Things Ain't What They Used to Be (1989)	One on One (1990)	Blue Bossa (1991)

Stéphane Grappelli chronology
Something Old Something New (1990)	One on One (1990)	In Tokyo (1990)

Professional ratings
Review scores
Source	Rating
Allmusic	4/5 stars

One on One is a 1990 album by violinist Stéphane Grappelli and pianist McCoy Tyner released on the Milestone label. It was recorded in April 1990 and features ten duo performances by Tyner and Grappelli. The Allmusic review by Scott Yanow states "The mutual respect they have for each other is obvious and they both sound a bit inspired".

== Track listing ==
1. "How High the Moon" (Nancy Hamilton, Morgan Lewis) – 3:55
2. "St. Louis Blues" (W. C. Handy) – 5:00
3. "I Want to Talk About You" (Billy Eckstine) – 3:53
4. "Mr. P.C." (John Coltrane) – 3:31
5. "Summertime" (George Gershwin, Ira Gershwin, Dubose Heyward) – 5:39
6. "Satin Doll" (Duke Ellington, Johnny Mercer, Billy Strayhorn) – 3:44
7. "I Didn't Know What Time It Was" (Lorenz Hart, Richard Rodgers) – 5:35
8. "You Say You Care" (Leo Robin, Jule Styne) – 3:04
9. "Yours Is My Heart Alone" (Ludwig Herzer, Franz Lehár, Beda Fritz Loehner) – 5:52
10. "I Got Rhythm" (Gershwin, Gershwin) – 2:45

== Personnel ==
- Stéphane Grappelli – violin
- McCoy Tyner – piano
