= Major Changes =

Studio album by Frank Morgan and the McCoy Tyner Trio
- Released: 1987
- Recorded: April 27–29, 1987
- Studio: Clinton Recording Studio, New York City
- Genre: Jazz
- Label: Contemporary
- Producer: Richard Bock

McCoy Tyner chronology
Double Trios (1986)	Major Changes (1987)	Bon Voyage (1988)

Frank Morgan chronology
Quiet Fire (1987)	Major Changes (1987)	Yardbird Suite (1988)

Professional ratings
Review scores
Source	Rating
Allmusic	4/5 stars
The Penguin Guide to Jazz Recordings	3/4 stars

Major Changes is a 1987 album by Frank Morgan with the McCoy Tyner Trio released on the Contemporary label. It was recorded in April 1987 and features performances by Morgan and Tyner with Avery Sharpe and Louis Hayes.

== Reception ==
The AllMusic review by Scott Yanow states, "Morgan's lyricism works quite well with Tyner's powerful chords, and the results are consistently memorable."

== Track listing ==
1. "Changes" - 5:10
2. "How Deep Is the Ocean?" (Irving Berlin) - 8:17
3. "Emily" (Johnny Mandel, Johnny Mercer) - 4:21
4. "Search for Peace" - 6:59
5. "Frank's Back" - 6:09
6. "All the Things You Are" (Oscar Hammerstein II, Jerome Kern) - 5:45
7. "(Where Do I Begin?) Love Story" (Francis Lai, Carl Sigman) - 10:43
8. "So What" (Miles Davis) - 9:40

All compositions by McCoy Tyner except as indicated
- Recorded in NYC, April 27, 28 & 29, 1987

== Personnel ==
- McCoy Tyner - piano
- Frank Morgan - alto saxophone
- Avery Sharpe - bass
- Louis Hayes - drums

Technical

- Ed Rak - recording engineer
- Jim Marshall - front cover photography
