= Herbie Lewis (musician) =

American jazz musician (1941–2007)

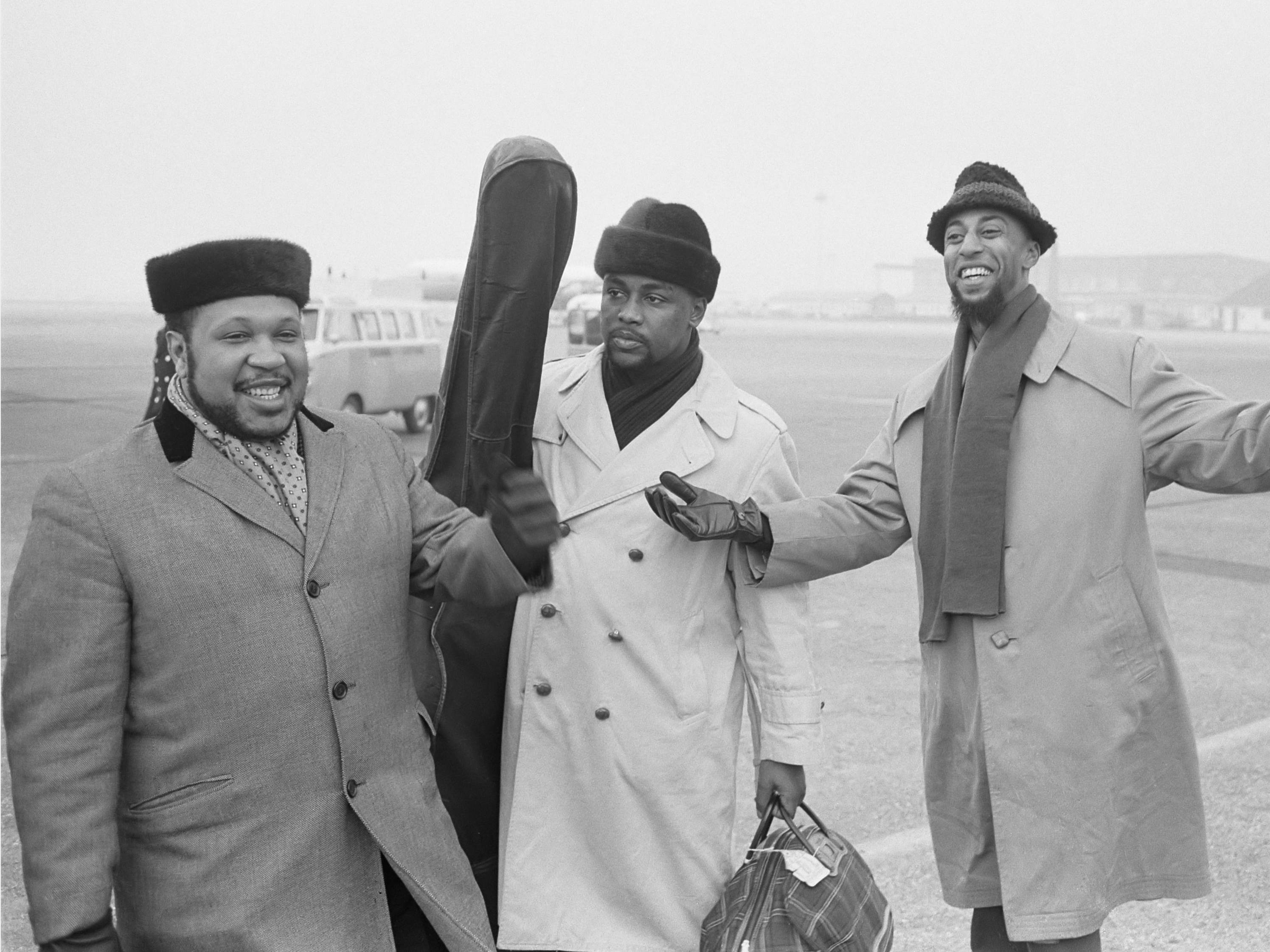
Les McCann, Herbie Lewis & Ron Jefferson (1962)

Herbie Lewis (February 17, 1941 – May 18, 2007) was an American jazz double bassist and jazz educator. He played or recorded with Cannonball Adderley, Stanley Turrentine, Bobby Hutcherson, Freddie Hubbard, Harold Land, Jackie McLean, Archie Shepp, Tete Montoliu and McCoy Tyner.

Lewis was founder and director of the Jazz Studies program at New College of California. He died of cancer in May 2007.

== Discography ==
=== As sideman ===
With Cannonball Adderley

- Great Love Themes (Capitol, 1966)
- Money in the Pocket (Capitol, 2005)

With Art Farmer and Benny Golson

- Here and Now (Mercury, 1962)
- Another Git Together (Mercury, 1962)

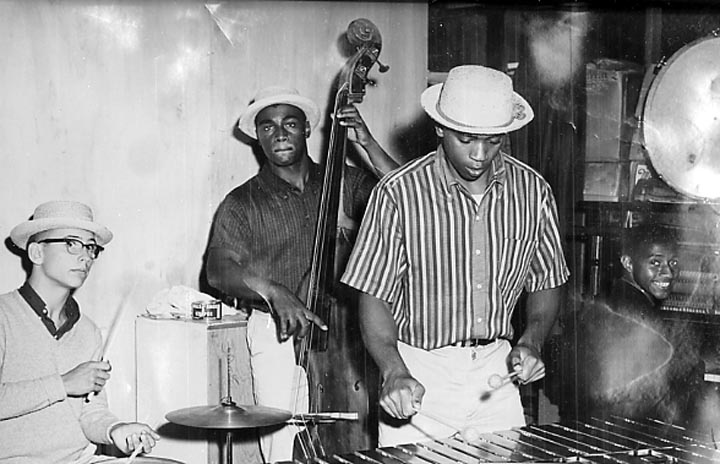
Roger Dawson (drums), H. Lewis (bass), Bobby Hutcherson (vibes), Nat Brown (piano): The Jazz Monitors (1957)

With Freddie Hubbard

- High Blues Pressure (Atlantic, 1968)
- Echoes of Blue (Atlantic, 1976)
- Above & Beyond (Metropolitan, 1999)
- Fastball: Live at the Left Bank (Label M, 2001)

With Bobby Hutcherson

- Stick-Up! (Blue Note, 1968)
- Now! (Blue Note, 1970)
- Solo / Quartet (Contemporary, 1982)
- Nice Groove (Baystate, 1984)
- Four Seasons (Timeless, 1985)

With Les McCann

- Les McCann Ltd. in San Francisco (Pacific Jazz, 1961)
- Pretty Lady (Pacific Jazz, 1961)
- Les McCann Sings (Pacific Jazz, 1961)
- Les McCann Ltd. in New York (Pacific Jazz, 1962)
- Les McCann Ltd. Plays the Shampoo (Pacific Jazz, 1963)
- Oh Brother! (Fontana, 1964)
- A Bag of Gold (Pacific Jazz, 1966)
- From the Top of the Barrel (Pacific Jazz, 1967)
- New from the Big City (Pacific Jazz, 1970)
- Django (United Artists, 1975)
- Pump It Up (Cream, 2002)

With Jackie McLean

- Let Freedom Ring (Blue Note, 1963)
- Consequence (Blue Note, 1979)

With McCoy Tyner

- Tender Moments (Blue Note, 1968)
- Time for Tyner (Blue Note, 1969)
- Expansions (Blue Note, 1969)
- Cosmos (Blue Note, 1976)
- Asante (Blue Note, 1998)

With others

- The Crusaders, The Festival Album (Pacific Jazz, 1967)
- Chico Freeman, Tales of Ellington (BlackHawk, 1987)
- Dodo Greene, My Hour of Need (Blue Note, 1963)
- John Handy, Centerpiece (Milestone, 1989)
- Eddie Harris, A Tale of Two Cities (Night 1991)
- Andrew Hill, Mosaic Select 16: Andrew Hill (Blue Note, 2005)
- Richard "Groove" Holmes, Groove (Pacific Jazz, 1990)
- Harold Land, The Fox (Contemporary, 1960)
- Lenny McBrowne, Lenny McBrowne and the 4 Souls (Pacific Jazz, 1960)
- Tete Montoliu, Live at the Keystone Corner (Timeless, 1981)
- Dave Pike, Pike's Peak (Epic, 1962)
- Sonny Red, Sonny Red (Mainstream, 1971)
- Sam Rivers, A New Conception (Blue Note, 1966)
- Jerry Rusch, Rush Hour (Inner City, 1979)
- Clifford Scott, Out Front! (Pacific Jazz, 1963)
- Shirley Scott, Hip Soul (Prestige, 1961)
- Archie Shepp, California Meeting: Live on Broadway (Soul Note, 1987)
- Sonny Simmons, Backwoods Suite (West Wind, 1990)
- Stanley Turrentine, That's Where It's At (Blue Note, 1962)
- Mal Waldron, Left Alone '86 (Paddle Wheel, 1987)
- Cedar Walton, Three Sundays in the Seventies (Label M 2000)
- Gerald Wilson, On Stage (Pacific Jazz, 1965)
