= Mustang! (Donald Byrd album) =

Studio album by Donald Byrd
- Released: October 1967
- Recorded: June 24, 1966; November 18, 1964 (Bonus tracks)
- Studio: Van Gelder Studio, Englewood Cliffs, NJ
- Genre: Jazz
- Length: 39:59 original LP; 56:17 CD reissue
- Label: Blue Note; BLP 4238; BST 84238
- Producer: Alfred Lion

Donald Byrd chronology
| I'm Tryin' to Get Home (1964) | Mustang! (1967) | Blackjack (1967) |

Mustang! is an album by American trumpeter Donald Byrd featuring performances by Byrd with Sonny Red, Hank Mobley, McCoy Tyner, Walter Booker, and Freddie Waits recorded in 1966 and released on the Blue Note label in 1967 as BLP 4238. The CD reissue included two bonus tracks recorded in 1964.

== Reception ==
The Allmusic review by Scott Yanow awarded the album 3 stars and stated "Byrd performs high-quality straight-ahead jazz that fits the modern mainstream of the era".

Professional ratings
Review scores
| Source | Rating |
|---|---|
| Allmusic | 3/5 stars |

== Track listing ==
All compositions by Donald Byrd except as indicated

1. "Mustang" (Sonny Red Kyner) - 8:30
2. "Fly Little Bird Fly" - 5:27
3. "I Got It Bad (and That Ain't Good)" (Duke Ellington, Paul Francis Webster) - 5:54
4. "Dixie Lee" - 6:43
5. "On the Trail" (Ferde Grofé) - 7:44
6. "I'm So Excited by You" - 5:41
7. "Gingerbread Boy" (Jimmy Heath) - 9:01 Bonus track on CD reissue
8. "I'm So Excited by You" [First Version] - 7:17 Bonus track on CD reissue

Recorded on November 18, 1964 (tracks 7–8) and June 24, 1966 (tracks 1–6).

== Personnel ==
Tracks 1–6

- Donald Byrd - trumpet
- Sonny Red - alto saxophone - except track 3
- Hank Mobley - tenor saxophone
- McCoy Tyner - piano
- Walter Booker - bass
- Freddie Waits - drums

Tracks 7–8

- Donald Byrd - trumpet
- McCoy Tyner - piano
- Jimmy Heath - tenor saxophone
- Walter Booker - bass
- Joe Chambers - drums
