= Freddie Waits =

American musician

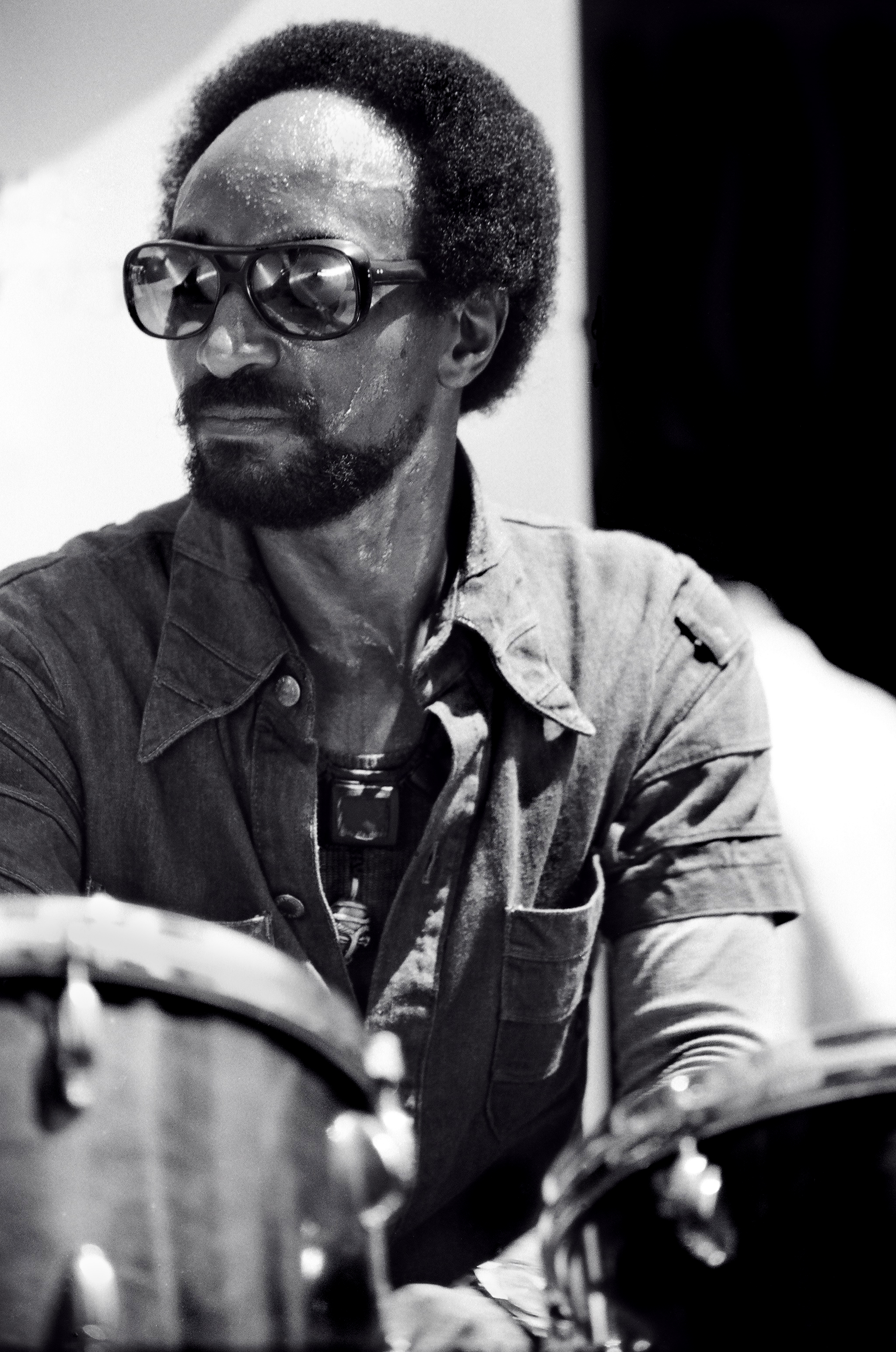
- Waits in 1976

Background information
- Born: April 27, 1943; Jackson, Mississippi, U.S.
- Died: November 18, 1989 (aged 46) New York City, U.S.
- Genres: Jazz; Avant-garde jazz; Bebop; Hard bop
- Instrument: Drums

Frederick Douglas Waits (April 27, 1943 – November 18, 1989) was an American hard bop and post-bop drummer.

Waits never officially recorded as leader, but was a prominent member and composer in Max Roach's M'Boom percussion ensemble. He worked as sideman with such pianists as McCoy Tyner, Kenny Barron, Andrew Hill, Gene Harris, Billy Taylor and Joe Zawinul. In 1967, Waits recorded with Freddie Hubbard. He was a member of the last Lee Morgan Quintet, an association ended by Morgan's murder in 1972.

In the late 1970s, Waits formed Colloquium III with fellow drummers Horace Arnold and Billy Hart. In the 1980s he became a music faculty member of Rutgers University. He died of pneumonia and kidney failure in New York in 1989.

His son is the drummer Nasheet Waits.

== Discography ==
=== As sideman ===
With Roy Ayers

- Daddy Bug (Atlantic, 1969)

With Kenny Barron

- You Had Better Listen (Atlantic, 1967) with Jimmy Owens
- Sunset to Dawn (Muse, 1973)
- Autumn in New York (Uptown, 1984)

With Gary Bartz

- Another Earth (Milestone, 1969)

With Willie Bobo

- A New Dimension (Verve, 1968)

With Ray Bryant

- Gotta Travel On (Cadet, 1966)
- Lonesome Traveler (Cadet, 1966)
- Slow Freight (Cadet, 1967)
- Sound Ray (Cadet, 1969)

With Kenny Burrell

- Night Song (Verve, 1969)

With Donald Byrd

- Mustang! (Blue Note, 1966)

With Stanley Cowell

- We Three (DIW, 1987)

With Richard Davis

- Epistrophy & Now's the Time (Muse, 1972)
- Dealin' (Muse, 1973)
- Harvest (Muse, 1977 [1979])
- Persia My Dear (DIW, 1987)

With Jack DeJohnette

- The Jack DeJohnette Piano Album (Landmark, 1985)

With Bill Dixon

- Bill Dixon in Italy Volume One (Soul Note, 1980)
- Bill Dixon in Italy Volume Two (Soul Note, 1980)

With Teddy Edwards

- The Inimitable Teddy Edwards (Xanadu, 1974)

With Ricky Ford

- Looking Ahead (Muse, 1986)

With Curtis Fuller

- Fire and Filigree (Bee Hive, 1978)

With Bunky Green

- Places We've Never Been (Vanguard, 1979)

With Tiny Grimes

- Profoundly Blue (Muse, 1973)

With Gene Harris

- Gene Harris of the Three Sounds (1972)

With Andrew Hill

- Grass Roots (Blue Note, 1968)
- Mosaic Select 16: Andrew Hill (Mosaic, 1969)
- Lift Every Voice (Blue Note, 1969)
- Strange Serenade (Soul Note, 1980)

With Buck Hill

- Capital Hill (Muse, 1990)

With Johnny Hodges

- Rippin' & Runnin' (Verve, 1968)

With Richard "Groove" Holmes

- Soul Mist! (Prestige, 1966 [1970])

With Freddie Hubbard

- High Blues Pressure (Atlantic, 1967)

With Willis Jackson

- West Africa (Muse, 1973)
- Headed and Gutted (Muse, 1974)

With Clifford Jordan

- Hello, Hank Jones (Eastworld, 1978)

With Hubert Laws

- Afro-Classic (CTI, 1970)
- Carnegie Hall (CTI, 1973)

With Junior Mance

- I Believe to My Soul (Atlantic, 1968)

With M'Boom

- Re: Percussion (Strata-East, 1973)
- M'Boom (Columbia, 1979)
- Collage (Soul Note, 1984)

With Charles McPherson

- New Horizons (Xanadu, 1977)

With René McLean

- Watch Out (SteepleChase, 1975)

With Mulgrew Miller and Reggie Workman

- Trio Transition (DIW, 1987)
- Trio Transition with Special Guest Oliver Lake (DIW, 1988)

With James Moody

- The Blues and Other Colors (Milestone, 1969)
- Feelin' It Together (Muse, 1973)

With Lee Morgan

- The Last Session (Blue Note, 1971)

With Don Patterson

- The Return of Don Patterson (Muse, 1972)

With Pharoah Sanders

- Karma (Impulse!)

With Shirley Scott

- Mystical Lady (Cadet, 1971)

With Buddy Terry

- Electric Soul! (Prestige, 1967)

With McCoy Tyner

- Time for Tyner (Blue Note, 1968)
- Expansions (Blue Note, 1968)
- Cosmos (Blue Note, 1977)

With Joe Zawinul

- The Rise and Fall of the Third Stream (Vortex, 1968)

With Denny Zeitlin

- Cathexis (Columbia, 1964)
