= Solo / Quartet =

Studio album by Bobby Hutcherson
- Released: 1982
- Recorded: September 28, 1981; October 9, 1981; February 1–2, 1982; March 1, 1982
- Genre: Jazz
- Length: 44:41
- Label: Contemporary
- Producer: John Koenig

Bobby Hutcherson chronology
Un Poco Loco (1980)	Solo / Quartet (1982)	Four Seasons (1985)

Solo / Quartet is an album by American jazz vibraphonist Bobby Hutcherson, recorded in 1981 and 1982 and released on the Contemporary label.

== Reception ==
The AllMusic review by Scott Yanow stated: "This is one of vibraphonist Bobby Hutcherson's most unusual and interesting releases... The quartet set is excellent but it is Bobby Hutcherson's solo performances that are most memorable and unique".

Professional ratings
Review scores
Source	Rating
AllMusic	4.5/5 stars
The Penguin Guide to Jazz Recordings	3/4 stars
The Rolling Stone Jazz Record Guide	3/5 stars

== Track listing ==
All compositions by Bobby Hutcherson except as indicated

1. "Gotcha" - 6:08
2. "For You, Mom and Dad" - 5:15
3. "The Ice Cream Man" - 6:58
4. "La Alhambra" - 5:44
5. "Old Devil Moon" (E. Y. Harburg, Burton Lane) - 7:47
6. "My Foolish Heart" (Ned Washington, Victor Young) - 5:23
7. "Messina" - 7:26

- Recorded at Ocean Way Recording in Hollywood, California on September 28 & October 9, 1981, February 1 & 2, and March 1, 1982

== Personnel ==
- Bobby Hutcherson - vibes, marimba, xylophone, bells, chimes, boo-bam
- McCoy Tyner - piano (tracks 4–7)
- Herbie Lewis - bass (tracks 4–7)
- Billy Higgins - drums (tracks 4–7)
- John Koenig - bells (track 3)
