= Lazy Bird =

Musical composition by John Coltrane

Lazy Bird is a musical composition by John Coltrane, first appearing on his 1958 album Blue Train.

Its name is most likely a play on the title of the Tadd Dameron composition "Lady Bird": Coltrane biographer Lewis Porter has proposed a harmonic relationship between "Lady Bird" and the A section of "Lazy Bird". (The bridge of Coltrane's song is apparently a variation on the standard "Lover Man"). The chord progression of "Lady Bird" may be transformed into that of "Lazy Bird" through chord substitution using the backdoor progression and tritone substitution.

== See also ==
- Tadd Dameron turnaround
