= Raphael Cruz =

American actor

- Raphael Cruz
- Born: September 5, 1986; Vallejo, California, U.S.
- Died: January 26, 2018 (aged 31); Paris, France
- Occupations: Acrobat, clown, actor
- Known for: Iris

Raphael Cruz (September 5, 1986 – January 26, 2018) was an American acrobat, clown and actor, a Bay Area native and international contemporary circus star, one of three brothers who performed together.

After training in San Francisco's Pickle Family Circus and then Montreal's National Circus School, Cruz had many brilliant performances with Montreal's The 7 Fingers and Cirque du Soleil, and the Chicago's Lookingglass Theatre Company. In 2011, Cruz played the lead role of Buster, a Buster Keaton inspired character, in the cinema themed Cirque du Soleil production Iris. Cruz was part of the choreography team for the opening ceremonies for the 2014 Winter Olympics in Sochi, Russia.

Raphael died unexpectedly at 31 years old on January 26, 2018, in Paris from undiagnosed heart ailment causing heart and lung failure.

The Raphael Cruz Scholarship Fund was created in 2024 by Club Fugazi, a performing arts theatre in San Francisco to provide Bay Area youth with opportunities to be inspired by Raphael's example and follow in his footsteps.
