= Solar: Live at Sweet Basil =

Live album by McCoy Tyner
- Released: 1991
- Recorded: June 14, 1991
- Venue: The Sweet Basil, NYC
- Genre: Jazz
- Length: 52:30
- Label: Alfa/Sweet Basil
- Producer: Shigeyuki Kawashima

McCoy Tyner chronology
| 44th Street Suite (1991) | Solar: Live at Sweet Basil (1991) | Key of Soul (1991) |

Professional ratings
Review scores
| Source | Rating |
|---|---|
| Allmusic | 4/5 stars |

Solar: Live at Sweet Basil is a 1991 live album by McCoy Tyner released on the Sweet Basil label. It was recorded in June 1991 at Sweet Basil in New York City and features a live performance by Tyner with bassist Avery Sharpe and drummer Aaron Scott. Another album of the evening's concert was released as Key of Soul (1992). The AllMusic review by Ken Dryden states, "This solid concert is easily recommended to fans of McCoy Tyner."

1997 release became a 2CD compilation album combined with Key of Soul (1992).

== Track listing ==
=== Original release (1991) ===
1. "Solar" (Miles Davis) - 9:39
2. "Don't Get Around Much Anymore" (Ellington, Russell) - 12:02
3. "Darn That Dream" (DeLange, Van Heusen) - 6:11
4. "Blues for T.M." - 12:53
5. "La Habana Sol" - 11:45

All compositions by McCoy Tyner except as indicated
- Recorded at Sweet Basil, New York, New York on June 14, 1991

=== Compilation version (1997) ===
Disk one

As same as the original release of 1991.

Disk two

As same as Key of Soul (1992).

== Personnel ==
- McCoy Tyner – piano
- Avery Sharpe – bass
- Aaron Scott – drums
