= The Real McCoy (McCoy Tyner album) =

1967 studio album by McCoy Tyner

Studio album by McCoy Tyner
- Released: October 1967
- Recorded: April 21, 1967
- Studios: Van Gelder Studio; Englewood Cliffs, New Jersey
- Genres: Jazz, post-bop, modal jazz
- Length: 37:06
- Label: Blue Note BST 84264
- Producer: Alfred Lion

McCoy Tyner chronology
McCoy Tyner Plays Ellington (1965)	The Real McCoy (1967)	Tender Moments (1968)

Professional ratings
Review scores
Source	Rating
AllMusic	4.5/5 stars
The Rolling Stone Jazz Record Guide	4/5 stars
The Penguin Guide to Jazz	4/4 stars
Encyclopedia of Popular Music	5/5 stars

The Real McCoy is the seventh album by jazz pianist McCoy Tyner and his first released on the Blue Note label. It was recorded on April 21, 1967, two years after Tyner's departure from the John Coltrane Quartet and during a difficult period in which Tyner considered leaving jazz and taking a day job as a cab driver. It features performances by Tyner with tenor saxophonist Joe Henderson, bassist Ron Carter, and former Coltrane Quartet drummer Elvin Jones. Producer Alfred Lion recalls the recording session as a "pure jazz session. There is absolutely no concession to commercialism, and there's a deep, passionate love for the music embedded in each of the selections."

In the additional liner notes to the 1999 remastered edition of the album, Bob Blumenthal writes: "Tyner chose to pursue the modal, rhythmically complex direction that the Coltrane quartet had staked out prior to the saxophonist's turn toward freer structures in 1965."

== Compositions ==
In the original liner notes by Nat Hentoff, Tyner discusses the pieces selected for this album. The titles for "Passion Dance" and "Contemplation" came to the pianist only after he had written the compositions. While the former sounds like "a kind of American Indian dance, evoking trance-like states", the latter has "the sound of a man alone. A man reflecting on what religion means to him, reflecting on the meaning of life." Tyner titled the fourth piece "Search for Peace" because of its tranquil feeling; it "has to do with a man's submission to God" and the "giving over of the self to the universe." The album closes with an upbeat, merry piece called "Blues on the Corner", a reminiscing musical portrait of Tyner's childhood: "When I was growing up in Philadelphia, some of the kids I knew liked to hang out on the corner [...] youngsters talking, kidding around, jiving."

All four of those compositions have gone on to become among the most widely covered of Tyner's pieces.

== Reception ==
The Penguin Guide to Jazz selected this album as part of its suggested "Core Collection", calling it "A key album in Tyner's discography .... Very highly recommended." The AllMusic review by Scott Yanow states that "Tyner was entering a period of struggle, although artistically his playing grew quite a bit in the late '60s ... easily recommended."

Jazz pianist Ethan Iverson writes, "Tyner's first Blue Note has proven to be one of the greatest jazz LPs in history. ... A masterpiece from top to bottom, a band of giants, everyone on the top of their game, and five of Tyner's most indelible themes."

In a JazzTimes review, Colin Fleming says that the album was Tyner's "ultimate disabuser of those lazy 'eh, he's just Trane's guy' notions. McCoy could flat out bring it, Trane or no Trane." Fleming adds that the opening track, "Passion Dance", "is straight-up trance raga via the American Southwest, unlike anything in jazz to that point. ... Tyner's playing suggests the ripped muscularity of a Nijinsky, but also the finesse, the grace." The review concludes: "The Real McCoy is the perfect record to speak on behalf of the man himself, through a voice with 10 fingers. Max notes, max traction, max radiance."

== Track listing ==
All compositions by McCoy Tyner

1. "Passion Dance" – 8:47
2. "Contemplation" – 9:12
3. "Four by Five" – 6:37
4. "Search for Peace" – 6:32
5. "Blues on the Corner" – 5:58

== Personnel ==
- McCoy Tyner - piano
- Joe Henderson - tenor saxophone
- Ron Carter - bass
- Elvin Jones - drums
