= Expansions (McCoy Tyner album) =

Studio album by McCoy Tyner
- Released: June 1970
- Recorded: August 23, 1968
- Studio: Van Gelder Studio, Englewood Cliffs, NJ
- Genre: Jazz, post-bop, modal jazz
- Length: 46:25
- Label: Blue Note BST 84338
- Producer: Duke Pearson

McCoy Tyner chronology
Time for Tyner (1968)	Expansions (1970)	Extensions (1973)

Expansions is the tenth album by jazz pianist McCoy Tyner and his fourth released on the Blue Note label. It was recorded in August 1968 and features performances by Tyner with trumpeter Woody Shaw, alto saxophonist Gary Bartz, tenor saxophonist Wayne Shorter, bassist Ron Carter (here playing cello), bassist Herbie Lewis and drummer Freddie Waits.

== Reception ==
Professional ratings
Review scores
Source	Rating
Allmusic	4.5/5 stars
The Rolling Stone Jazz Record Guide	5/5 stars

The AllMusic review by Scott Yanow stated: "The stimulating music falls between advanced hard bop and the avant-garde, pushing and pulling at the boundaries of modern mainstream jazz".

== Track listing ==
All compositions by McCoy Tyner, except as indicated.

1. "Vision" - 12:18
2. "Song of Happiness" - 12:00
3. "Smitty's Place" - 5:21
4. "Peresina" - 10:21
5. "I Thought I'd Let You Know" (Cal Massey) - 6:25

== Personnel ==
- McCoy Tyner – piano
- Woody Shaw – trumpet
- Gary Bartz – alto saxophone, wooden flute (on track 2)
- Wayne Shorter – tenor saxophone, clarinet (on track 2)
- Ron Carter – cello
- Herbie Lewis – bass
- Freddie Waits – drums
