= Echoes of a Friend =

Studio album by McCoy Tyner
- Released: 1972
- Recorded: November 11, 1972; Tokyo
- Genre: Jazz
- Length: 46:26
- Label: JVC, Milestone
- Producer: Orrin Keepnews

McCoy Tyner chronology
Sahara (1972)	Echoes of a Friend (1972)	Song for My Lady (1973)

Echoes of a Friend is a 1972 album by jazz pianist McCoy Tyner released on the JVC label, and later on the Milestone label. It was recorded in Tokyo, Japan, on November 11, 1972, and features Tyner in a solo piano tribute to John Coltrane.

== Reception ==
Professional ratings
Review scores
Source	Rating
AllMusic	5/5 stars
The Penguin Guide to Jazz Recordings	3.5/4 stars
The Rolling Stone Jazz Record Guide	5/5 stars

The AllMusic review by Scott Yanow states: "Few McCoy Tyner records are not easily recommended but this one even ranks above most."

== Track listing ==
All compositions by McCoy Tyner except where noted.

1. "Naima" (Coltrane) – 6:43
2. "Promise" (Coltrane) – 6:14
3. "My Favorite Things" (Hammerstein, Rodgers) – 8:44
4. "The Discovery" – 17:35
5. "Folks" – 7:33

== Personnel ==
- McCoy Tyner – piano
