= It's About Time (McCoy Tyner & Jackie McLean album) =

Studio album by McCoy Tyner & Jackie McLean
- Released: 1985
- Recorded: April 6–7, 1985
- Studio: Right Track Studios, NYC
- Genre: Jazz
- Length: 37:10
- Label: Blue Note
- Producer: Jeffrey Weber

McCoy Tyner chronology
Dimensions (1984)	It's About Time (1985)	Just Feelin' (1985)

Jackie McLean chronology
Monuments (1984)	It's About Time (1985)	Left Alone '86 (1986)

Professional ratings
Review scores
Source	Rating
Allmusic	3/5 stars

It's About Time is a 1985 album by pianist McCoy Tyner and alto saxophonist Jackie McLean, the first released on the re-established Blue Note label. It was recorded in April 1985 and features performances by Tyner and McLean with trumpeter Jon Faddis, bassist Ron Carter, drummer Al Foster, bass guitarist Marcus Miller, and percussionist Steve Thornton. The Allmusic review by Scott Yanow calls the album "reasonably enjoyable but less memorable than one might expect".

Tyner's composition "You Taught My Heart to Sing" appears on the album in its original instrumental version. Subsequent to the recording on "It's About Time", lyricist Sammy Cahn wrote a lyric for "You Taught My Heart to Sing". Singer Dianne Reeves recorded a vocal version of the song in 1988, and the song has since been recorded by other singers.

== Track listing ==
1. "Spur of the Moment" – 5:53
2. "You Taught My Heart to Sing" (Tyner, Sammy Cahn) – 6:30
3. "It's About Time" – 6:17
4. "Hip Toe" – 6:29
5. "No Flowers Please" (Carter) – 5:35
6. "Travelin'" – 6:26

== Personnel ==
- McCoy Tyner – piano
- Jackie McLean – alto saxophone (tracks 1–4)
- Al Foster – drums
- Ron Carter – bass (tracks 1, 4 & 5)
- Jon Faddis – trumpet (tracks 1, 4 & 6)
- Marcus Miller – bass (tracks 2, 3 & 6)
- Steve Thornton – percussion (track 2, 3 & 6)
