= Sahara (McCoy Tyner album) =

Studio album by McCoy Tyner
- Released: July 1972
- Recorded: January 1972
- Studio: Decca Recording Studio, New York City
- Genre: Jazz
- Length: 47:55
- Label: Milestone; MSP 9039
- Producer: Orrin Keepnews

McCoy Tyner chronology
| Asante (1970) | Sahara (1972) | Echoes of a Friend (1972) |

Sahara is the twelfth album by jazz pianist McCoy Tyner, his first to be released on the Milestone label. It was recorded in January 1972 and features performances by Tyner with saxophonist Sonny Fortune, bassist Calvin Hill, and drummer Alphonse Mouzon. The music shows African and Eastern influences and features all the musicians playing multiple instruments, with Tyner himself utilizing koto, flute, and percussion in addition to his usual piano.

== Reception ==
Professional ratings
Review scores
| Source | Rating |
|---|---|
| AllMusic | 5/5 stars |
| DownBeat | 5/5 stars |
| The Penguin Guide to Jazz Recordings | 3/4 stars |
| The Rolling Stone Jazz Record Guide | 5/5 stars |

The AllMusic review by Brian Olewnick states, "Tyner would go on to create several fine albums in the mid-'70s, but never again would he scale quite these heights. Sahara is an astonishingly good record and belongs in every jazz fan's collection."

In addition to its critical praise, the album is also considered Tyner's commercial breakthrough; it sold over 100,000 copies and was nominated for two Grammys.

== Track listing ==
All compositions by McCoy Tyner

1. "Ebony Queen" — 9:00
2. "A Prayer for My Family" — 4:48
3. "Valley of Life" — 5:19
4. "Rebirth" — 5:20
5. "Sahara" — 23:27

== Personnel ==
- McCoy Tyner - piano, koto (3), percussion (5), flute (5)
- Sonny Fortune - alto saxophone (4), soprano saxophone (1, 5), flute (3, 5)
- Calvin Hill - bass, reeds (3, 5), percussion (3, 5)
- Alphonse Mouzon - drums, trumpet (5), reeds (5), percussion (3, 5)
