= Together (McCoy Tyner album) =

Studio album by McCoy Tyner
- Released: 1979
- Recorded: August 31 & September 3, 1978
- Studio: Fantasy Studios, Berkeley
- Genre: Jazz
- Length: 41:15
- Label: Milestone
- Producer: Orrin Keepnews

McCoy Tyner chronology
Counterpoints (2004)	Together (1979)	Horizon (1979)

Professional ratings
Review scores
Source	Rating
Allmusic	4/5 stars
The Rolling Stone Jazz Record Guide	4/5 stars
DownBeat	5/5 stars

Together is a 1979 album by jazz pianist McCoy Tyner released on the Milestone label. It was recorded in August and September 1978 and features performances by Tyner with trumpeter Freddie Hubbard, flautist Hubert Laws, tenor saxophonist/bass clarinetist Bennie Maupin, vibraphonist Bobby Hutcherson, bassist Stanley Clarke, drummer Jack DeJohnette and percussionist Bill Summers.

== Reception ==
The Allmusic review by Scott Yanow states "The music is essentially high-quality advanced modal hard bop and each of the sidemen get their opportunities to be showcased".

== Track listing ==
1. "Nubia" (Tyner) - 8:08
2. "Shades of Light" (Laws) - 7:43
3. "Bayou Fever" (DeJohnette) - 4:49
4. "One of Another Kind" (Hubbard) - 7:05
5. "Ballad for Aisha" (Tyner) - 7:19
6. "Highway One" (Hutcherson) - 6:11

== Personnel ==
- McCoy Tyner – piano
- Freddie Hubbard: trumpet, flugelhorn
- Hubert Laws – flute, alto flute
- Bennie Maupin – tenor saxophone, bass clarinet
- Bobby Hutcherson – vibes, marimba
- Stanley Clarke – bass
- Jack DeJohnette – drums
- Bill Summers – conga, percussion
