= Avery Sharpe =

American jazz bassist, composer, and educator (born 1954)

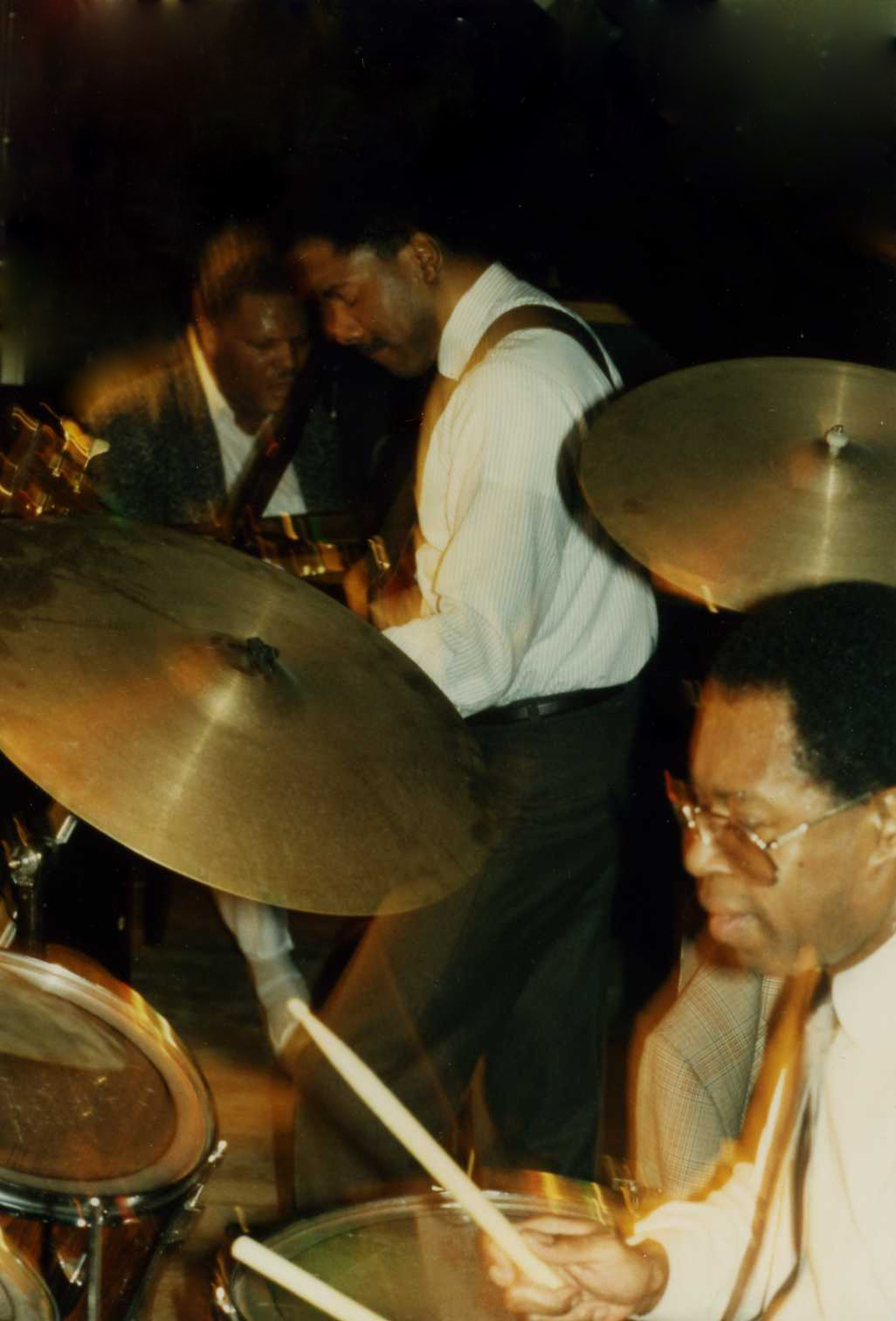
- McCoy Tyner - Avery Sharpe - Louis Hayes (Berlin 1987)

Background information
- Born: Avery George Sharpe; August 23, 1954; Valdosta, Georgia, U.S.
- Genres: Jazz
- Occupation: Musician
- Instrument: Double bass
- Years active: 1970s–present
- Label: JKNM
- Website: averysharpe.com

Avery Sharpe (born August 23, 1954) is an American jazz double-bassist, electric bassist, composer, educator and founder of the artist-owned record label, JKNM Records.

Sharpe has a distinguished percussive and rhythmic approach on double bass. He incorporates the Hum-a-long (vocal scatting with the bowed bass) bass technique, popularized by Leroy "Slam" Stewart and Major "Mule" Holly, into his playing.

Sharpe was first bought to prominence by tenor saxophonist Archie Shepp and drummer Art Blakey, but is best known for his longtime association with pianist McCoy Tyner from 1980 to 2003. He recorded more than 20 records with Tyner.

== Early life ==
Sharpe's first instrument was the piano, which he started playing at eight years old. His mother, Evelyn, was a pianist and choir director in the Church of God in Christ (COGIC) and she gave lessons to Sharpe, as well as to his seven other siblings. Sharpe also studied the accordion in his youth and ultimately the electric bass. While attending the University of Massachusetts, Amherst, Sharpe studied double bass with Reggie Workman, and also studied with Max Roach, Archie Shepp, Horace Boyer and Fred Tillis. He played the double and electric bass in gospel, funk, rock groups, jazz band and orchestra.

== Biography ==
He played as a sideman with Yusef Lateef, Ricky Ford, and Joe Ford, among others. As a leader, he has released on Sunnyside Records, and several albums on his own label, JKNM. Avery Sharpe has multiple roles at Williams College, as an Artist Associate and Jazz Coach. He serves additional roles at Williams College; as Faculty Advisor for the Williams Gospel Choir and as affiliation with the Africana Studies department.

== Personal life ==
Sharpe's parents, James and Evelyn (Green) Sharpe, had eight children, of whom Avery was the sixth-born.

He married his high school sweetheart Cheryl (née Scott) after college and they have four children. He is a health enthusiast and has promoted vegan/plant based lifestyle and physical training since 1977.

== Compositions ==
In 1989, he wrote and conducted the soundtrack for the movie An Unremarkable Life. In the 1990s, Sharpe was commissioned by Fideleo to write three extended works.

In 2004, he wrote a musical portrait for the stage for Chamber Music Plus. Sharpe and actress/dancer Jasmine Guy are featured in the stage production of Raisin’ Cane. His composition "January in Brazil" is on McCoy Tyner's Grammy Award-winning big band album "Journey".

Sharpe has been commissioned by the Springfield Symphony Orchestra on multiple occasions. Sharpe debuted his six-movement piece America's Promise with the Springfield Symphony Orchestra. In 2006, he was commissioned to write a Concerto for Jazz Trio and Orchestra, which premiered in 2007 with Kevin Eubanks on acoustic guitar.

== 400: An African American Musical Portrait ==
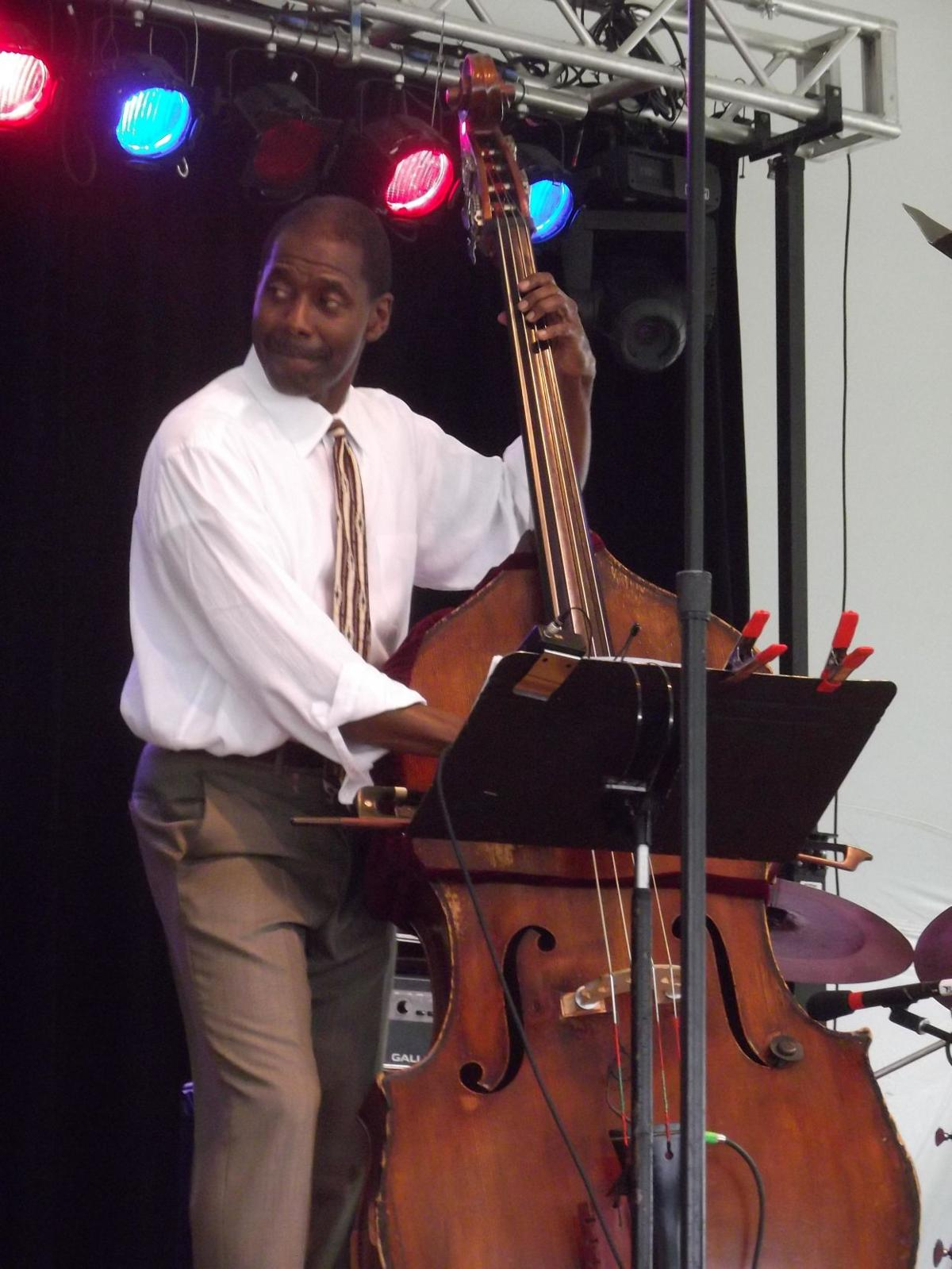
Sharpe at the Litchfield Jazz Festival in 2013

Sharpe released an album in 2019 titled 400: An African American Musical Portrait, which is in reference to the 400th anniversary of the first African slaves were brought to Jamestown, Virginia in 1619 by the Dutch. The album utilizes many styles, to feature the African American musical tradition.

== Awards ==
Sharpe has been awarded the NAACP Martin Luther King Jr Special Achievement Award, National Endowment for the Arts Grants, and the New England Foundation for the Arts Achievement in Jazz Award (1997).

== Discography ==
=== As leader ===
- Unspoken Words (Sunnyside, 1988)
- Extended Family (JKNM, 1993)
- Extended Family, Vol. 2: Thoughts of My Ancestors (JKNM, 1995)
- Extended Family, Vol. 3: Family Values (JKNM, 2001)
- Dragon Fly (JKNM, 2005)
- Epic Ebony Journey (JKNM, 2005)
- Legends and Mentors (JKNM, 2008)
- Autumn Moonlight (JKNM, 2009)
- Avery Sharpe Trio Live (JKNM, 2010)
- Raisn' Cane (musical excerpts from the play with Jasmine Guy and the Avery Sharpe Trio) (JKNM, 2010)
- Running Man (JKNM, 2011)
- Sojourner Truth “. . . ain’t I a woman?” (JKNM, 2012)
- Sharpe Meets Tharpe- A tribute to Sister Rosett (JKNM, 2016)
- 400: An African American Musical Portrait (JKNM, 2019)

=== As sideman ===
With McCoy Tyner

- La Leyenda de La Hora (The Legend of the Hour) (1981)
- Just Feelin' (1985)
- Double Trios (1986)
- Major Changes (1987)
- Bon Voyage (1987)
- Live at the Musicians Exchange Cafe (1987)
- Uptown/Downtown (1988)
- Solar: Live at Sweet Basil (1991)
- Blue Bossa (1991)
- Remembering John (1991)
- McCoy Tyner / Sir Roland Hanna* – Double Exposure (1992)
- "Key of Sol"-Live at Sweet Basil (1991)
- Journey (1993)
- Infinity (1995)
- Autumn Mood (1997)
- McCoy Tyner and the Latin All-Stars (1999)

With Yusef Lateef

- Tenors of Yusef Lateef and Archie Shepp(YAL, 1992)
- Yusef Lateef Plays Ballads (YAL, 1992)
- Tenors featuring Rene McLean (YAL, 1993)
- Yusef Lateef and Ralph M. Jones III, Woodwinds (YAL,1993)
- Yusef Lateef Metamorphosis(YAL, 1993)
- Tenors of Yusef Lateef & Ricky Ford (YAL, 1994) with Ricky Ford
- Full Circle Yusef Lateef (YAL, 1996)
- CHNOPS: Gold & Soul Yusef Lateef (YAL, 1997)

With Archie Shepp

- Archie Shepp "Attica Blues-Live at Palais des Glaces"-(Blue Marge Record, 1979)
- Archie Shepp-The Good Life(Black and Blue, 1984)

With Frank Morgan

- "Major Changes"-Contemporary Records(1987)

With John Blake

- "Twinkling of an Eye"-Grammavision(1985)

With David Matthews

- "Jazz Ballads with Strings"-Alfa Records(1991)

With Steve Grossman

- "In New York"-Disques Dreyfus(1991)

With Vacca/Moran

- "Dance Beneath the Diamond Sky"-Columbia Records(1992)

With Jeri Brown

- "Fresh Start"-Just In Time Records(1996)
- “Zaius”-Just In Time Records(1998)
- “I’ve Got Your Number”- Just In Time Records(1999)
- The Image in the Mirror-Tryptec”-Just In Time Records(2001)
- “ Firm Roots”-Just In Time Records(2003)

With Marc Puricelli

- "The Shade"-Music Masters(1996)
- "Melting Point"-Music Masters(1994)
- “Desire”-Music Masters

With Chico Freeman

- “Oh By the Way” Quataca(Double Moon Records, 2001)
