= François Chassagnite =

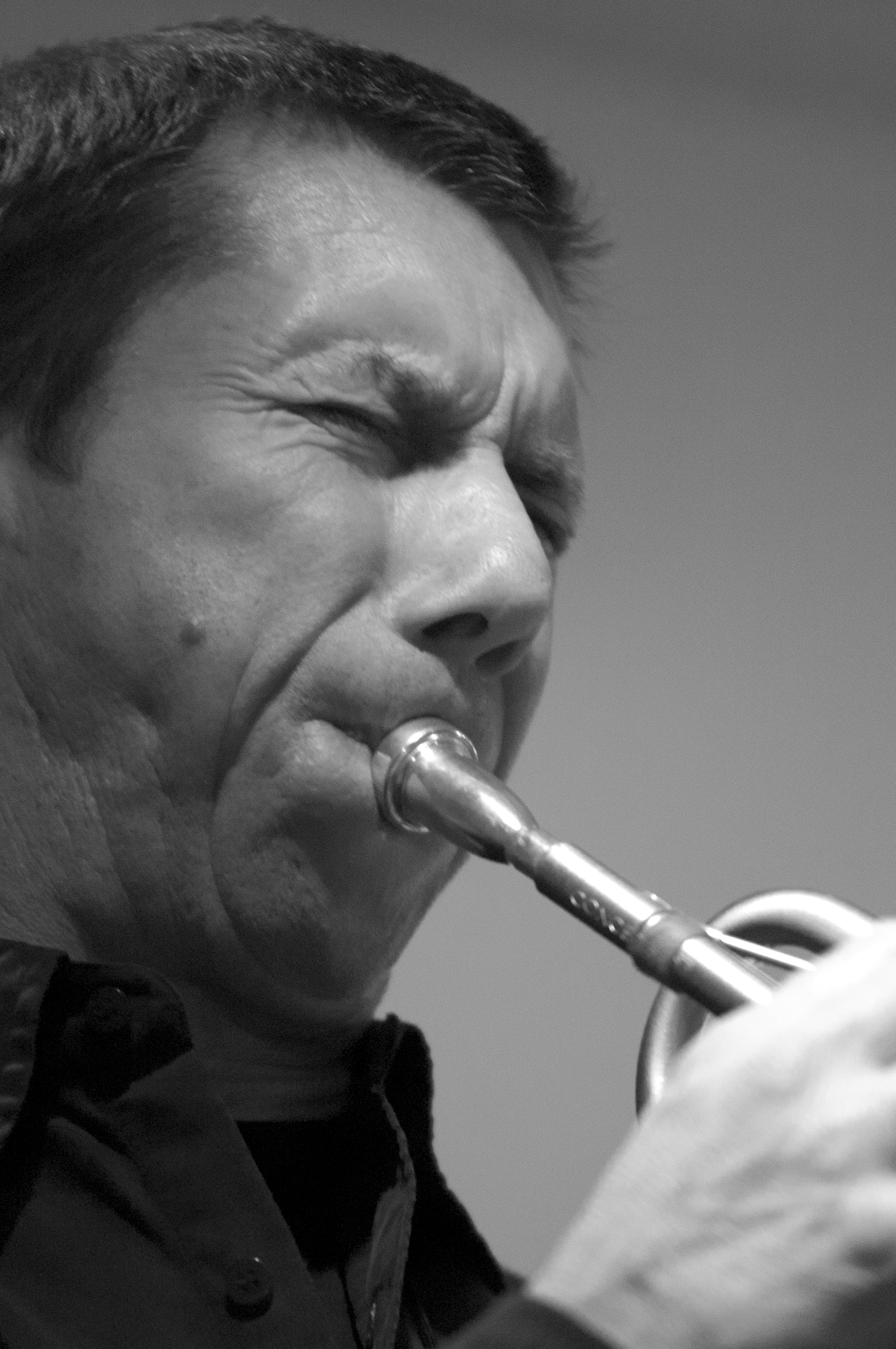
François Chassagnite

François Chassagnite (June 21, 1955, Ussel - April 8, 2011, Nice) was a French jazz trumpeter, who played with the Orchestre National de Jazz, Gérard Badini, Gil Evans and others.

== Discography ==
=== Leader ===
- 1989 : Samya Cynthia - Chassagnite Quartet (Arnaud Matteï (p), Jean Bardy (b), Oliver Johnson (d)), Label La Lichère, remastered in 2001 by Frémeaux & Associés, Studio Acousti, Paris
- 1995 : Chazzéologie - Chassagnite Quintet (Gilles Naturel (ts), Arnaud Matteï (p), Christophe Le Van (b), Jean-Pierre Arnaud (d)), Instant Présent, Studio Ferber, Paris
- 1996 : Savane - Chassagnite Sextet "Sorgho" (Arnaud Matteï (p), Eric Daniel (g), Christophe Le Van (b), Jean-Pierre Arnaud (d), Abdou Mboup (perc)), Label Pavillon, CCAS, Touvres
- 1998 : Kess Kess - Chassagnite Quintet "Sorgho" (Tiacob Sadia (d), Eric Vincenot (b), Eric Daniel (g), Arnaud Matteï (p)), Label Pavillon/Quoi de neuf Docteur
- 2000 : Un Poco Loco - Chassagnite Quartet (Frédéric d'Oelsnitz (p), Fabrice Bistoni (b), Yoann Serra (d)), TCB-The Montreux Jazz Label, Studio 26, Antibes. (The track 1, "Phaléne", also appears in 2009 compilation album A La Costa Sud)
- 2006 : Jubilation, Tribute to Chet Baker - Chassagnite Trio (Olivier Giraudo (g), Pascal Masson (b)), TCB-The Montreux Jazz Label, Studio de Laghet, Laghet
- 2012 : Chat Ssagnite - Chassagnite Quartet (Sylvain Romano (b), Jean-Pierre Arnaud (d), Jean-Paul Florens ou Michel Perez ou Olivier Giraudo (g)), recorded June 2010, Frémeaux & Associés, Studio 26, Antibes
- 2017 : Bird Feathers - Olivier Giraudo & François Chassagnite Quartet (Olivier Giraudo (g), Luigi Trussardi (b), Charles Bellonzi (d)), recorded November 2009, Imago records, Studio des Flots Bleus, Prunay en Yvelines

=== Sideman ===
- 1983 : Live in Paris - Antoine Hervé Big Band, Philoé Music, live at Radio France
- 1983 : Coketales - Orchestre Laurent Cokelaere, Caravage Productions, Studio Hérisson, Mulhouse
- 1984 : Torride - Jean-Loup Longnon Big Band, Rue 52e Est
- 1985 : Bob 13 - Antoine Hervé, Mediartis/Flat & Sharp, live at Théâtre Dunois, Paris
- 1985 : Lightnin' - Andy Emler Quartet (Andy Emler (p), Marc Ducret (g), Philippe Talet (b), François Verly (d)), Philoé Music, Studio Ramses, Paris
- 1986 : SOS 5 - SOS Quintet (Marc Ducret (g), Denis Leloup (tb), Marc Michel (b), Umberto Pagnini (d)), IDA records, Studio Gimmick, Yerres
- 1986 : ONJ 1986 - François Jeanneau, Label Bleu, Studio Charles Cros, Amiens
- 1986 : My Swing Is Still Alive - Gérard Badini Super Swing Machine, Arpej/Selmer, Studio Grand Pavois, Montigny-le-Bretonneux
- 1986 : L'Orchestre national de jazz - Jazz Bühne Berlin 86 , Amiga Jazz, Berlin DDR, live at Friedrichstadtpalast, Berlin
- 1987 : Brass Création - Le Concert Arban, (Orchestre "Ephémère"), Arion, Studio Davout, Paris
- 1987 : Rhythm-A-Ning - Big Band Lumière Laurent Cugny/Gil Evans, Emarcy, Studio Acousti, Paris
- 1987 : En Vacances Au Soleil - La Bande à Badault, (Denis Badault (p)), Label Bleu, live at Théâtre Dunois, Paris
- 1988 : Pandemonium - François Jeanneau, Carlyne Music, Théâtre Dunois, Paris
- 1989 : Regards Sur Vian - Magali Noël, (Richard Pizzorno (p), Jean-Philippe Viret (b), Guillaume Naturel (ts), Michel Julien (d)) enregistrement Théâtre de Beausobre, Suisse, BUDA Records
- 1989 : Hommage à Christian Garros - Big Band de Rouen, Vogue, live at Théâtre des 2 rives, Rouen
- 1989 : Golden Hair - Big Band Lumière Laurent Cugny/Gil Evans, Emarcy/Universal, Studio Acousti, Paris
- 1990 : Kamala - Arnaud Matteï Nonet, Label La Lichère, live at Studio 105 Radio France
- 1991 : Gérard Gustin Onztet - Gérard Gustin, Label JSL, live at Jazz Club Lionel Hampton, Paris
- 1991 : Lesotho - Richard Calleja Quartet (Richard Calleja (ts), Philippe Yvron (p), Jean-Louis Escalle (d), Michel Altier (b)), Jazz à Labouheyre, Studio Condorcet, Toulouse
- 1995 : Plays Monk - Epistrophy Quartet (Gilbert "Bibi" Rovere (b), Fred d'Oelsnitz (p), Bernard Weidmann (d)), Tribal Production, Studio Tribal, Cannes
- 1996 : Traverses - Gilles Fabre Quintet (Gilles Godefroy (p), Bernard Cochin (b), Stéphane Foucher (d), Gilles Fabre (ts, as, ss)), Association "Collectif" Champ libre, studio Accès Digital, Rouen
- 1997 : Clins d'Œil - Pierre Girot (Pierre Girot (g), Jean-Charles Capon (cello), Gilbert "Bibi" Rovere (b), Jean-Claude Jouy (d)), Label Nuit, Studio Eibon Prod, Brive
- 1998 : Esmak? - Stéphane Bertrand, Night&Day, Studio Hémisphère Sud, Nice
- 2000 : Douceur Lunaire - Jean-Marc Jafet, RDC Records, Studio 26, Antibes
- 2000 : Clandestin - Stéphane Bertrand, Night&Day Studio Hémisphère Sud, Nice
- 2001 : Black Suite - Philippe Festou Grand 8, Night & Day, Studio 26, Antibes
- 2002 : Vive Les Jongleurs - Jean-Philippe Muvien (Jean-Philippe Muvien (g), Jean-Marc Jafet (b), Yoann Serra (d)), Cristal Records, Studio 26, Antibes
- 2004 : Urban Adventures - Emanuele Cisi (Emanuele Cisi (ts), Paolo Birro (p), Simone Monnanni (b), Yohann Serra (d)), Label Elabeth, Studio 26, Antibes
- 2004 : Storias - Michel Perez Sextet (Michel Perez (g), André Ceccarelli (d), Sylvain Beuf (ts), Nico Morelli (p), Vincent Artaud (b)), Notes Croisées, Studio 26, Antibes
- 2004 : Sax Paris Jazz Joue Charlie Parker - Sax Paris Jazz (Pascal Thouvenin (as)), Label SPJ, Studio Cordyboy, Chérisy
- 2004 : Naima - Linus Ollson Sextet (Linus Ollson (g), Yona Yacoub (as), Fred Luzignant (tb), Kevin Tardevet (b), Jean-Luc Veran (d)), Monaco Jazz Chorus, Studio Lakanal, Montpellier
- 2005 : Chronologie - Un Des Sens, Termites Production, Studio Boombox, Nice
- 2005 : Rosco Il Est Content Et Cie - Rosco il est Content - Label Imago records
- 2006 : Symphojazz Orchestra - Jean-Manuel Jimenez, Orchestre du conservatoire de Cannes, Studio 26, Antibes
- 2008 : 3 Secrets - Sashird Lao, Label Imago records, Studio du Théâtre Lino Ventura, Nice
- 2008 : Invitations - Marc Perez Quartet and Friends, Mosaic Music, Studio Clair et Net, Decazeville
- 2008 : 10 - Corou de Berra, direction Michel Bianco, CDB Productions, Studio Acoustic Ladyland, Berre-les-Alpes
- 2009 : Bleu Nuit - Sarah Eden, Label Beamlight, Studio de Meudon, Meudon, Studio Palmito, Nice
- 2010 : I Feel So Good - Virginie Teychené (Virginie Teychené (vocal), Stéphane Bernard (p), Gérard Maurin (b), Jean-Pierre Arnaud (d)), Label Altrisuoni, Studio Siboni, La Seyne-sur-Mer
- 2010 : Canta Ti Passa - Corou de Berra, direction Michel Bianco, CDB Productions, Studio Acoustic Ladyland, Berre-les-Alpes
- 2011 : Good Morning Billie - Behia (Behia (vocal), Francis Lockwood (p), Jérôme-Auguste Charlery (b), Frédéric Sicart (d)), Behia Jazz
- 2011 : Festival - Nice Jazz Orchestra Pierre Bertrand, Cristal Records, Studio 26, Antibes, Studio Alhambra-Colbert, Rochefort
