= Orchestre National de Jazz =

French national jazz orchestra

Orchestre National de Jazz is a French orchestra that was created by French Ministry of Culture in 1986. It has had 12 musical and artistic directors, more than 200 soloists and recorded 33 albums. Orchestre National de Jazz won the Victoires du Jazz in 2009 and 2020, and was nominated for a Grammy Award in 2012 for the album Shut Up And Dance composed by John Hollenbeck.

== Members ==
=== ONJ François Jeanneau - 1986 ===
- François Jeanneau – soprano and tenor saxophones, musical direction
- Éric Barret, Jean-Louis Chautemps, Richard Foy, Pierre-Olivier Govin, Bruno Rousselet – saxophones, clarinets, flutes, bassoon
- François Chassagnite, Michel Delakian, Christian Martinez, Éric Mula – trumpet, flugelhorn
- Jean-Louis Damant, Denis Leloup, Yves Robert – trombone
- Didier Havet – tuba
- Andy Emler – keyboards, synthesizers
- Denis Badault – piano, synthesizers
- François Verly – vibraphone, marimba, percussions
- Marc Ducret – electric guitar
- Michel Benita – double bass, electric bass
- Aaron Scott – drums

=== ONJ Antoine Hervé - 1987 to 1989 ===
- Antoine Hervé – piano, musical direction
- Francis Bourrec, Gilbert Dall'anese, Laurent Dehors, Pierre-Olivier Govin, Alain Hatot, Jean-Pierre Solves –saxophones
- Michel Delakian, Antoine Illouz, Christian Martinez, Philippe Slominski – trumpet, flugelhorn
- Jacques Bolognesi, Bernard Camoin, Glenn Ferris, Denis Leloup, Gilles Salommez – trombone
- Patrice Petitdidier – French horn
- Didier Havet – tuba
- Philippe Guez – keyboards
- Pierre-Michel Balthazar, François Verly – percussions
- Nguyên Lê – electric guitar
- Jean-Marc Jafet, Étienne M'Bappé, François Moutin – double bass, electric bass
- André Ceccarelli, Mokhtar Samba – drums

=== ONJ Claude Barthélemy - 1989 to 1991 ===
- Claude Barthélemy – electric guitar, musical direction
- Michael Riessler, Bobby Rangell – saxophones
- Jean-François Canape, Patrick Fabert – trumpet, flugelhorn
- Yves Favre, Luca Bonvini – trombone
- Michel Godard – tuba
- Jean-Louis Matinier – accordion
- Mico Nissim – piano
- Serge Lazarevitch, Gérard Pansanel – electric guitar
- Renaud Garcia-Fons, Jean-Luc Ponthieux – double bass, electric bass
- Manuel Denizet, Christian Lété – drums

=== ONJ Denis Badault - 1991 to 1994 ===
- Denis Badault – piano, musical direction
- Élise Caron – vocals, flute
- Rémi Biet, Laurent Blumenthal, Philippe Sellam, Simon Spang-Hanssen – saxophones
- Claude Égéa, Claus Stötter – trumpet, flugelhorn
- Jean-Louis Pommier, Geoffroy de Masure – trombone
- Didier Havet – tuba
- Nedim Nalbantoglu – violin
- Laurent Hoevenaers – cello
- Xavier Desandre Navarre – percussions
- Lionel Benhamou – electric guitar
- Heiri Kaenzig, Bob Harrison – double bass, electric bass
- François Laizeau – drums

=== ONJ Laurent Cugny - 1994 to 1997 ===
- Laurent Cugny – keyboards, musical direction
- Denis Barbier – flute
- Stefano Di Battista, Boris Blanchet, Pierre-Olivier Govin, Stéphane Guillaume – saxophones
- Claude Égéa, Serge Plume, Claus Stötter, Pierre Drevet, Flavio Boltro– trumpet, flugelhorn
- Bernard François, Jacques Peillon – French horn
- Phil Abraham– trombone
- Philippe Legris, Christian Laisné – tuba
- Benoît de Mesmay – keyboards
- Lionel Benhamou, Frédéric Favarel – electric guitar
- Frédéric Monino – electric bass
- Stéphane Huchard – drums

=== ONJ Didier Levallet - 1997 to 2000 ===
- Didier Levallet – double bass, musical direction
- Chris Biscoe, Frédéric Couderc, Jean-Rémy Guédon, Richard Foy – saxophones, clarinets
- Harry Beckett, Michel Feugère, Nicolas Folmer – trumpet, flugelhorn
- Lionel Surin – French horn
- Phil Abraham, Yves Robert – trombone
- Vincent Courtois, Alain Grange – cello
- Serge Lazarevitch – electric guitar
- Sophia Domancich – piano
- François Laizeau, Ramón López –drums

=== ONJ Paolo Damiani - 2000 to 2002 ===
- Paolo Damiani – cello, musical direction
- François Jeanneau soprano saxophone, flute, musical codirection
- Javier Girotto, Christophe Monniot, Thomas de Pourquery, Jean-Marc Larché – saxophones
- Médéric Collignon, Alain Vankenhove – pocket trumpet, trumpet, flugelhorn
- Gianluca Petrella, Guéorgui Kornazov – trombone
- Didier Havet – tuba, sousaphone
- Régis Huby – violin
- Olivier Benoit, Manu Codjia – electric guitar
- Paul Rogers – double bass
- Christophe Marguet – drums
- Laure Donnat – vocals

=== ONJ Claude Barthélemy - 2002 to 2005 ===
- Claude Barthélemy – electric guitar, oud, musical direction
- Philippe Lemoine, Vincent Mascart – saxophones
- Médéric Collignon, Geoffroy Tamisier – pocket trumpet, trumpet, flugelhorn
- Sébastien Llado, Jean-Louis Pommier, Pascal Benech – trombone, bass trombone
- Didier Ithursarry – accordion
- Vincent Limouzin – vibraphone, marimba
- Alexis Thérain – electric guitar
- Nicolas Mahieux, Olivier Lété – double bass, electric bass
- Jean-Luc Landsweerdt – drums

=== ONJ Franck Tortiller - 2005 to 2008 ===
- Franck Tortiller – vibraphone, musical direction
- Éric Séva – saxophones
- Jean Gobinet – trumpet, bugle
- Jean-Louis Pommier – trombone
- Michel Marre – tuba
- Vincent Limouzin – vibraphone, marimba
- Yves Torchinsky – double-bass
- Patrice Héral – drums, vocals

Close to Heaven program:

- David Pouradier-Duteil –drums
- Xavier Garcia – samples, electronics

Sentimental 3/4 program:

- Herbert Joos – trumpet, bugle
- Bruno Wilhelm – saxophones
- Éric Bijon – accordion

Électrique program:

- Joël Chausse – trumpet, bugle
- Claude Gomez – samples, electronics

=== ONJ Daniel Yvinec - 2009 to 2013 ===
- Daniel Yvinec – artistic direction
- Joce Mienniel – flutes, electronics
- Antonin-Tri Hoang, Matthieu Metzger, Rémi Dumoulin– saxophones, clarinets
- Guillaume Poncelet, Sylvain Bardiau – trumpet, flugelhorn
- Vincent Lafont – keyboards, electronics
- Ève Risser – piano, prepared piano, flute
- Pierre Perchaud – electric guitar
- Sylvain Daniel – electric bass
- Yoann Serra – drums

=== ONJ Olivier Benoit, 2014 to 2017 ===
- Olivier Benoit – electric guitar, artistic direction
- Jean Dousteyssier – clarinet
- Alexandra Grimal, Hugues Mayot, Robin Fincker, Christophe Monniot – saxophones
- Fidel Fourneyron – trombone
- Fabrice Martinez – trumpet, flugelhorn
- Théo Ceccaldi – violin, viola
- Sophie Agnel – piano, prepared piano
- Paul Brousseau – keyboards
- Bruno Chevillon, Sylvain Daniel – double bass, electric bass
- Éric Échampard – drums

=== ONJ Frédéric Maurin - 2019 to 2024 ===
- Frédéric Maurin – artistic direction

Dancing in Your Head(s) program (2019)

Orchestration Fred Pallem

- Jean-Michel Couchet, Anna-Lena Schnabel, Julien Soro, Fabien Debellefontaine – saxophones, clarinets, flutes
- Fabien Norbert, Susana Santos Silva – trumpet, flugelhorn
- Mathilde Fèvre – French horn
- Daniel Zimmermann, Judith Wekstein – trombone, bass trombone
- Bruno Ruder – keyboards
- Pierre Durand – electric guitar
- Frédéric Maurin – electric guitar, direction
- Sylvain Daniel – electric bass
- Rafaël Koerner – drums
- Tim Berne (guest) – alto saxophone

Rituels program (2019)

Compositions Ellinoa, Sylvaine Hélary, Leïla Martial, Grégoire Letouvet, Frédéric Maurin

- Ellinoa, Leïla Martial, Linda Oláh, Romain Dayez – vocals
- Catherine Delaunay – clarinet, basset horn
- Julien Soro, Fabien Debellefontaine – saxophones, clarinets, flutes
- Fabien Norbert, Susana Santos Silva – trumpet, flugelhorn
- Christiane Bopp – trombone
- Didier Havet – tuba
- Elsa Moatti, Guillaume Roy – violin, viola
- Juliette Serrad – cello
- Bruno Ruder – piano
- Stéphan Caracci – vibraphone, marimba, glockenspiel
- Raphaël Schwab – double bass
- Rafaël Koerner – drums
- Frédéric Maurin – direction

Dracula young audience show (2019)

Texts – Estelle Meyer, Milena Csergo, Julie Bertin, Romain Maron

Composition – Grégoire Letouvet, Frédéric Maurin

Staging – Julie Bertin / artistic collaboration: Yan Tassin

- Estelle Meyer, Milena Csergo, Manika Auxire, Camille Constantin, Pauline Deshons – actresses
- Fanny Ménégoz – flute
- Julien Soro, Fabien Debellefontaine, Guillaume Christophel – saxophones, clarinets, flutes
- Quentin Ghomari – trumpet, flugelhorn
- Mathilde Fèvre – French horn
- Christiane Bopp – trombone
- Christelle Séry – electric guitar
- Raphaël Schwab – double bass
- Rafaël Koerner – drums

Ex Machina program (2022)

Composition – Steve Lehman, Frédéric Maurin

- Fanny Ménégoz – flute
- Catherine Delaunay – clarinet, basset horn
- Steve Lehman – alto saxophone, electronics
- Julien Soro – tenor saxophone, clarinet
- Fabien Debellefontaine – baritone saxophone, clarinet, flute
- Fabien Norbert – trumpet, flugelhorn
- Jonathan Finlayson – trumpet
- Daniel Zimmermann – trombone
- Christiane Bopp – trombone
- Fanny Meteier – tuba
- Bruno Ruder – piano
- Chris Dingman – vibraphone
- Stéphan Caracci – vibraphone, marimba, glockenspiel
- Sarah Murcia – double bass
- Rafaël Koerner – drums
- Jérôme Nika – generative electronics creation & artistic collaboration
- Dionysios Papanikolaou – IRCAM electronics

== Discography ==
- 1986: Orchestre National de Jazz 86 (Label Bleu)
- 1987: ONJ 87 (Label Bleu)
- 1989: ONJ 88-89 African Dream (Label Bleu)
- 1990: Claire (Label Bleu)
- 1991: Jack-Line (Label Bleu)
- 1992: À plus tard (Label Bleu)
- 1993: Monk Mingus Ellington (Label Bleu)
- 1994: Bouquet final (Label Bleu)
- 1996: In Tempo (Verve)
- 1996: Reminiscing (Verve)
- 1997: Merci, merci, merci (Verve)
- 1998: ONJ Express (Evidence)
- 1999: Séquences (Evidence)
- 2000: Deep Feelings (Evidence)
- 2002: Charmediterranéen (ECM Records)
- 2003: Admirabelamour (Label Bleu)
- 2004: La fête de l'eau (Le Chant du Monde)
- 2004: L'ONJ traverse le Canada, DVD (Frémeaux & Associés)
- 2005: Close to Heaven (Le Chant du Monde)
- 2007: Électrique (Le Chant du Monde)
- 2009: Around Robert Wyatt (Bee Jazz)
- 2010: Shut Up And Dance (Bee Jazz)
- 2012: Piazzolla! (JazzVillage)
- 2014: The Party (JazzVillage)
- 2014: Europa Paris (ONJ Records)
- 2015: Europa Berlin (ONJ Records)
- 2016: Europa Rome (ONJ Records)
- 2017: Europa Oslo (ONJ Records)
- 2018: Orchestre National de Jazz, Concert anniversaire 30 ans (ONJ Records)
- 2020: Dancing in Your Head(s) (ONJ Records)
- 2020: Rituels (ONJ Records)
- 2021: Dracula Adèle Maury and Orchestre National de Jazz (ONJ Records)
- 2023: Ex Machina Steve Lehman and Orchestre National de Jazz (ONJ Records - Pi Recordings)
