= Aaron Scott (musician) =

American composer and jazz drummer

- Born: 19 May 1956 (age 70); Chicago, Illinois
- Genres: Jazz
- Occupations: Musician, teacher
- Instrument: Drums
- Years active: 1983–present
- Labels: Label Bleu, Evidence, Birdology, Impulse!

Aaron Scott (born 1956) is an American composer and jazz drummer from Chicago, Illinois. He has studied at several prestigious music schools. He was one of the founding member of the Orchestre National de Jazz, was awarded Chevalier dans l'Ordre des Arts et des, won three Grammy awards, and has worked with several well known Jazz artists.

== Life and career ==
Aaron Scott was born June 19, 1956 in Chicago, Illinois. As a child, Aaron learned to play the piano, accordion, trombone, and drums. By the time he was 9 years old, he was primarily focused on the drums. Aaron attended Berklee College of Music in 1982, studying music education and performance. He also studied conducting from 1983 to 1985 at the Boston Conservatory. He was the principal timpanist and assistant conductor of the Brookline Symphony Orchestra. After graduating from the Berklee College of Music in 1985, he moved to Paris.

While in Paris, Aaron studied conducting at the École Normale de Musique de Paris. In 1986 he became one of the founding members of the Orchestre National de Jazz, directed by François Jeanneau, when it was created by Jack Lang, the Minister of Culture. During his time with the Orchestre National de Jazz, Aaron was the drummer and assistant conductor. He worked with Marc Ducret, Michel Benita, Yves Robert, Bruno Chevillon, Eric Watson, Jean-Paul Céléa, and other jazz groups. Aaron was also awarded Chevalier dans l'Ordre des Arts et des.

In 1989 Aaron began a 14-year association and tenure with master jazz pianist McCoy Tyner as the drummer for the McCoy Tyner Trio, and the McCoy Tyner Big Band, winning three Grammy Awards and performing worldwide. The first two Grammy's were for the McCoy Tyner Big Band albums The Turning Point (1991) and Journey (1993), and the third was for The McCoy Tyner Trio’s album Infinity (1995). He has also appeared with well-known musicians like George Benson, Michael Brecker, Ron Carter, Chick Corea, Larry Coryell, Gil Evans, Frank Foster, Dizzy Gillespie, Joe Henderson, Freddie Hubbard, Bobby Hutcherson, Steve Lacy, Claudio Roditi, John Scofield, and Steve Swallow.

Aaron is currently living in New York. He is the Founder and Curator of the Inwood Jazz Festival. and teaches at the New York Jazz Academy.

== Discography ==
=== As sideman ===
With McCoy Tyner

- Live at Sweet Basil (Evidence, 1989)
- Solar: McCoy Tyner Trio Live at Sweet Basil (Alfa, 1991)
- 44th Street Suite (Red Baron, 1991)
- Blue Bossa (Lester Recording, 1991)
- Remembering John (Enja, 1991)
- McCoy Tyner Big Band, The Turning Point (Verve, 1991)
- McCoy Tyner and Sir Roland, Double Exposure (1991)
- McCoy Tyner Big Band, Journey (Verve, 1993)
- McCoy Tyner Trio, Infinity (Impulse!, 1995)
- Autumn Mood (Laserlight, 1997)
- Key of Soul (Alfa, 1992)

With others

- Orchestre Nationale de Jazz, Orchestre Nationale de Jazz '86 (Label Bleu, 1986)
- Orchestre Nationael de Jazz, Jazz Bühne Berlin '86 (AMIGA, 1986)
- Bob Stewart, Then & Now (Postcards, 1996)
- Marc Ducret, La Theorie Du Pilier (Label Bleu, 1987)
- Eric Watson:, Your Tonight is my Tomorrow (Owl Records, 1987)
- Francois Jeanneau, Taxiway (Label Bleu, 1988
- Yves Robert, Des Satelites Avec Des Traces De Plumes (Evidence, 1988)
- Jeff Silvertrust Quintet Feat. Archie Shepp, Hip Knossis (Bulldozers from Jupiter, 2001)
- Michael Hackett, Circles, (Summit, 2005)
- Billy Harper, Blueprints of Jazz Vol. 2 (Talking House Records, 2008)
- Barney Wilen Quartet Feat. Tete Montoliu – Barney And Tete (Grenoble '88) (Elemental Music, 2020)
