= Régis Huby =

French jazz musician (born 1969)

Régis Huby (born 22 June 1969 in Rennes, France) is a French jazz violinist, composer, and arranger.

== Biography ==
Huby studied classical music at the Conservatory in Rennes with Catherine Luquin, at the Conservatoire National Supérieur de Musique et de Danse de Paris (CNSM) with François Jeanneau, Hervé Sellin, Patrick Moutal and Alain Savouret. During this time he worked with Dominique Pifarély and Louis Sclavis. He played in a duo with Vincent Courtois, in the Living Time Orchestra with George Russell, and founded the string ensemble Quatuor IXI (recordings with Joachim Kühn: Phrases) with Irene Lecoq, Guillaume Roy and Alain Grange, and was the musical director and arranger of the project Nuit Américaine by Lambert Wilson. His first recordings in the field of jazz were made in 1994 with Maria Laura Baccarini (All Around).

In the second half of the 1990s, Huby also played with Didier Lockwood/Onztet de Violon Jazz, Luc Le Masne, Riccardo Del Fra, Jean-Charles Capon and Denis Colin. In 1998 he recorded his debut album Le Sentiment des Brutes on which among others Noël Akchoté participated. Since 1999 he has played with the quartet of Yves Rousseau, with which several albums (most recently 2014 Akasha) were published. From the 2000s, he also worked with Denis Badault, Gérard Pansanel, Claude Tchamitchian, Olivier Benoît, and Guillaume Séguron, and in the ensembles Sound of Choice (Album Invisible Correspondance, with Fredrik Lundin, Guillaume Roy, and Hasse Poulsen among others). He was also a member of the Orchestre National de Jazz under the direction of Paolo Damiani for the production Charmeditéranéen (ECM 2002, with Anouar Brahem and Gianluigi Trovesi). In jazz, he was involved in 22 recording sessions between 1994 and 2011.

Since the 1990s he has worked as a musician, arranger, and composer on numerous music theater projects and festivals in cooperation with Philippe Destrem, François Raulin, Philippe Deschepper and Ute Lemper. In 2013 he appeared in a duo with Jean-Marc Foltz at the Münsterland Festival.

== Discography (selection) ==
=== Solo albums ===
- 1998: Le Sentiment Des Brutes (Transes Européennes, Buda Musique), with Hervé Villieu, Jean Le Floc'h, Bernard Subert, Vincent Guérin, Régïs Boulard, Noël Akchoté
- 2006: Simple Sound (Le Chant du Monde), with Catherine Delaunay, Roland Pinsard, Olivier Benoit, Alain Grange, Bruno Chevillon.

=== Collaborations ===
- 1997: Capophonie (CC Production), with Jean-Charles Capon Original Quartet
- 2002: Oui Mais (Signature/Radio France, France Musique), with Régis Boulard
- 2004: Opus Incertum On C... (émouvance), with Octet De Jean-Pierre Jullian
- 2005: Phrasen (Signature), with Quatuor IXI feat. Joachim Kühn
- 2005: Too Fast For Techno (Quoi de Neuf Docteur), with Serge Adam
- 2010: All Around (Abalone), with Maria Laura Baccarini, Yann Apperry
- 2011: Cixircle (Abalone), with Quatuor IXI
- 2012: Songs No Songs (Abalone), with H3B (Denis Badault, Tom Arthurs, Sébastien Boisseau)
- 2012: Ways Out (Abalone), with Claude Tchamitchian Quartet
- 2014: Akasha (Abalone), with Yves Rousseau Quartet
- 2015: Temps Suspendus (Abalone), with Quatuor IXI
- 2015: Gaber, Io E Le Cose (Abalone), with Maria Laura Baccarini
- 2015: Wanderer Septet (Abalone), with Wanderer Septet feat. Yves Rousseau
- 2016: Need Eden (émouvance), with Claude Tchamitchian Tentet
