= Infinity (McCoy Tyner album) =

1995 studio album by McCoy Tyner

Studio album by McCoy Tyner Trio featuring Michael Brecker
- Released: August 1995
- Recorded: April 12–14, 1995
- Studio: Van Gelder Studio, Englewood Cliffs, NJ
- Genre: Jazz
- Length: 72:23
- Label: Impulse!
- Producer: Michael Cuscuna

McCoy Tyner chronology
Prelude and Sonata (1995)	Infinity (1995)	What the World Needs Now (1996)

Professional ratings
Review scores
Source	Rating
AllMusic	4.5/5 stars
The Penguin Guide to Jazz Recordings	3/4 stars

Infinity is an album by McCoy Tyner released on the Impulse! label in 1995. It was recorded in April 1995 and features performances by Tyner with tenor saxophonist Michael Brecker, bassist Avery Sharpe, drummer Aaron Scott and percussionist Valtinho Anastacio. The album won the 1996 Grammy for Best Jazz Instrumental Performance (Individual or Group), while Michael Brecker won the Grammy for Best Jazz Instrumental Solo for the track "Impressions".

== Reception ==
The AllMusic review by Scott Yanow states that "There are not a lot of surprises on this quartet matchup except perhaps for how well Tyner and Brecker mesh together... Brecker's presence and consistently powerful playing does inspire Tyner and his sidemen. For a strong example as to why today's saxophonists have such a high opinion of Michael Brecker, his roaring statement on the extended "Impressions" will suffice. Highly recommended".

== Track listing ==
All compositions by McCoy Tyner except where noted.

1. "Flying High" - 10:14
2. "I Mean You" (Hawkins, Monk) - 7:19
3. "Where Is Love" - 5:31
4. "Changes" - 9:46
5. "Blues Stride" - 3:38
6. "Happy Days" - 9:42
7. "Impressions" (Coltrane) - 11:13
8. "Mellow Minor" - 9:21
9. "Good Morning Heartache" (Drake, Fisher, Higginbotham) - 5:26
- Recorded at Rudy Van Gelder Studio, Englewood Cliffs, NJ, April 12 (track 1 & 6), 13 (tracks 4, 7 & 8) and 14 (tracks 2, 3, 5 & 9), 1995

== Personnel ==
- McCoy Tyner – piano
- Michael Brecker – tenor saxophone
- Avery Sharpe – bass
- Aaron Scott – drums
- Valtinho Anastacio– congas, percussion
