= A La Costa Sud =

Compilation album by Various artists
- Released: May 19, 2009
- Genres: Jazz, Latin music, world, funk, pop, electro, nu jazz R&B.
- Length: 58:56 (CD 1); 55:30 (CD 2); 52:34 (CD 3)
- Label: Edizioni Musicali Curci
- Producer: Pino Presti

A La Costa Sud (La Musique De La Côte D'Azur) is a compilation album created and produced by Italian musician and producer Pino Presti, released in 2009 on Edizioni Musicali Curci. The album consists of 3 CDs performed by 28 vocalists and / or instrumentalists who are from various continents and nations but who regularly play in theaters, clubs and festivals in the French Riviera. We can find, among others, female singers Shirley Bunnie Foy, Lilian Terry, Janysett McPherson, Nina Papa, Isa Rabaraona, Georgia Mancio, Timothée; trumpeter François Chassagnite, bassist Jean-Marc Jafet, pianist Francesco Crosara, saxophonist Ruben Paz, singer-bassist Scott Parker Allen, guitarist Linus Olsson.

== Genres of music ==
The album includes many different genres of music like jazz, Latin music, world, funk, pop, electro, Nu Jazz and R&B.

== Video ==
The broadcasting of the photographic video of A La Costa Sud has been made by Monte Carlo Producer Note and by Cannes France, the complete guide to Cannes, France, which broadcast it during the Cannes Film Festival.

== Track listing ==
=== Cd1 - A La Costa Latin and World ===
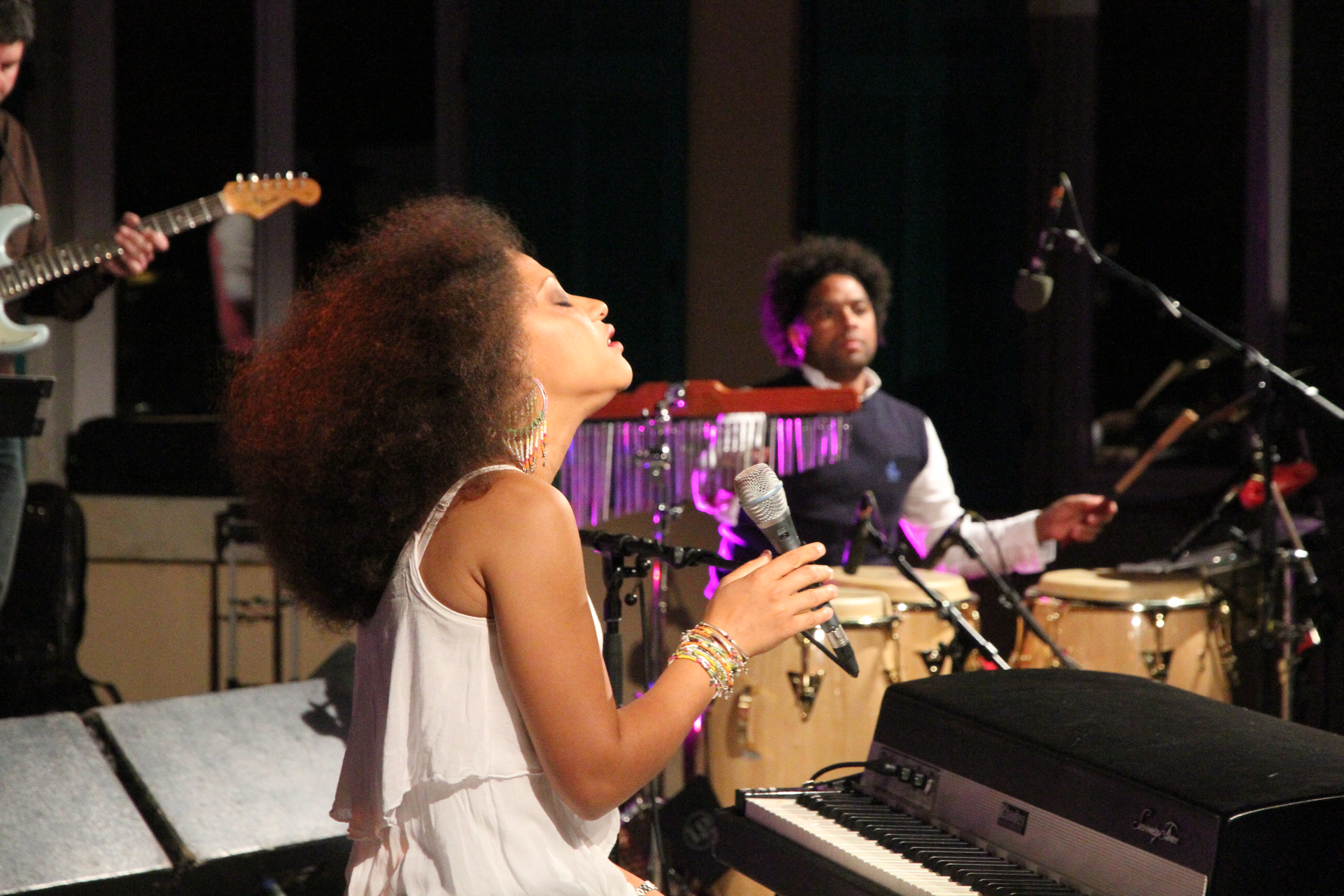
Cuban singer and pianist Janysett McPherson

1. Salsa Universal (B. Sundres / R. Quintero) - Conjunto Massalia (Cuba-France)
2. Canto A Yemaya (J. McPherson) - Conjunto Massalia
3. Partage (D. Gaspari) - Conjunto Massalia
4. Alguien En Quien Confiar (J. McPherson) - Janysett McPherson (Cuba)
5. Vocè Vai Ver (A.C. Jobim) - Nina Papa (Brazil)
6. Sabe Vocè (C. Lyra / V. De Moraes) - Nina Papa
7. Dowtown Guaguanco (R. Paz) - Ruben Paz (Cuba)
8. African Spirit (R. Paz) - Ruben Paz
9. Oxala (O. Roura) Oxai Roura (Guyana-Brazil)
10. Balance (F.D. F. Alves / G. Anfosso) - Gabriel Anfosso (France)
11. A Felicidade (A.C. Jobim) - Montparnasse (Italy-France)
12. Gémeaux (F.D. F. Alves / G. Anfosso) - Gabriel Anfosso
13. Samba Um (R. Torre / Allan Jones) - Samba Um (Brazil)
14. Além Do Rio (R. Torre / R. Pereira) - Samba Um
15. Gimme Gimme Gimme (G.Daks) - Groovy Daks (Ghana)
16. Ny Fanahy (I. Rabaraona) - Isa Rabaraona (Madagascar)
17. Gabrielle (T. Galliano) - Thierry Galliano (France)
18. Si Vocè Voltar (N. Luchi) - Nicolas Luchi (France) / Linus Olsson (Sweden)
19. Nkommode (G.Daks) - Groovy Daks

=== Cd2 - A La Costa Jazz ===
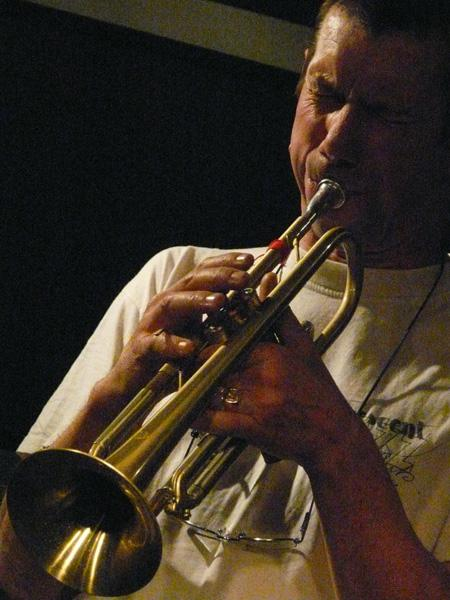
French trumpeter François Chassagnite

1. Don't Ever Go Away (Jobim / Duran / Gilbert) - Lilian Terry (UK-Italy-Egypt)
2. Phaléne (F. D'Oelnitz) - François Chassagnite (France)
3. Nica's Dream (H. Silver) - Nina Papa (Brazil)
4. Suite Venus (F. Crosara) - Francesco Crosara USA-Italy)
5. Miami Nights (A. Bianchi) - Amedeo (Italy)
6. In And Out (J.M. Jafet) - Jean Marc Jafet (France)
7. It Don't Mean a Thing (Mills / Ellington) Shirley Bunnie Foy (USA)
8. The Old Country (N. Adderly / C. R. Davis) - Georgia Mancio (UK)
9. Easy To Love (C. Porter) - Francesco Crosara
10. Funky Dream (A. Bianchi) - Amedeo
11. God Bless the Child (Holiday/ Herzog) - Lilian Terry
12. Lookin' For (G. Prestipino G.) - Pino Presti Sound (Italy)
13. Mantega Righi (J.M. Jafet) - Jean Marc Jafet
14. Something Old...Something New (A. Bianchi) - Amedeo
15. Harlem Town (S.B. Foy / G. Fabris) - Shirley Bunnie Foy / Josh Fabris (Italy)
16. On Verra (L. Olsson) - Linus Olsson (Sweden)
17. When Sunny Gets Blue (J/ Segal / M. Fisher) - Shirley Bunnie Foy

=== Cd3 - A La Costa Love Flavors ===
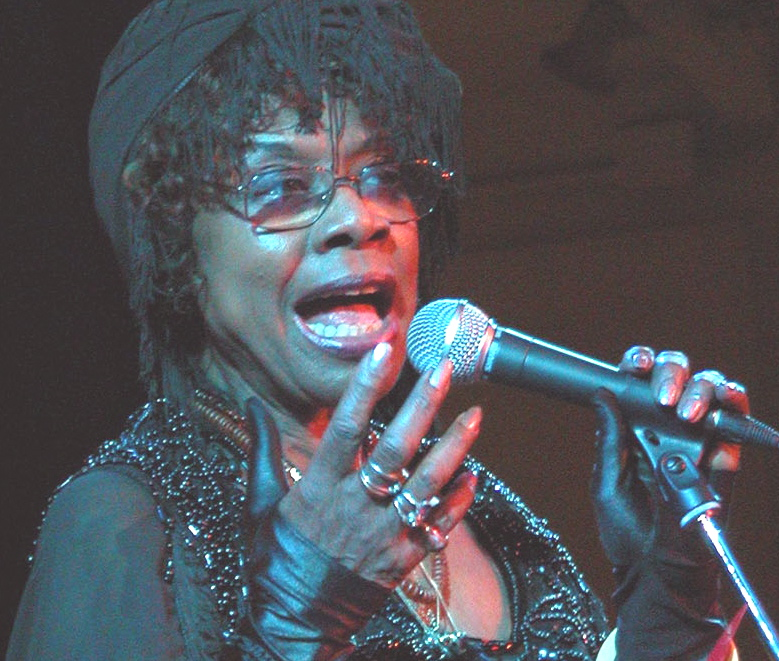
American jazz singer Shirley Bunnie Foy

1. Douce France (C.Trenet) - Christophe Chapelle (France)
2. Something Stupid (C.Carson Parker) - Scott Parker Allen (USA)
3. You Will Be All Right (E./M. Benlolo) - Santos (France)
4. Stekache (N. Luchi) - Nicolas Luchi (France)
5. Le Fruit Qu'on Fit (T. Delcourt) - Timothée (France)
6. Now Loading (M. Guillermont) - Marc Guillermont (France)
7. Round About Midnight (T. Monk) - Eddy & Dus meet Lilian Terry (UK)
8. I Wanna Bioman (S. P. Allen) - Scott Parker Allen
9. Business World (E./M. Benlolo) - Santos
10. L.O.V.E. (M. Gabler / B. Kaempfert) Shirley Bunnie Foy USA)
11. Decembre (Succede A Dicembre) - (P. Palma / D. Viccaro / G. Prestipino / M.Luca) - Janysett McPherson (Cuba)
12. Lady Ann (prologue) - (M. Guillermont) - Marc Guillermont
13. I'm Longing For Love (Seymour / D. Modugno) - Pino Presti & Mad of Jazz
14. Intro Sakai (L. Olsson) - Linus Olsson feat. Yona Yacoub (Francia)
15. Vierge (F.D. F. Alves / G. Anfosso) - Gabriel Anfosso (France)
16. Try To Be Somebody (E./M. Benlolo) - Santos
17. Elegie (F. Apostoly) - Les Dupont (France)
18. Ue Lé Lé (S.B. Foy) - Shirley Bunnie Foy

=== Artists ===
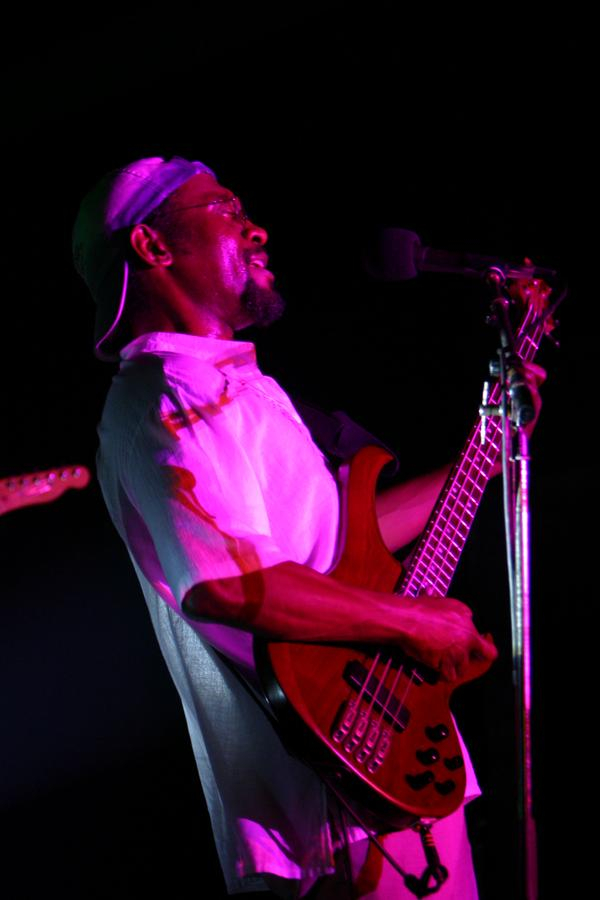
Soul & funk singer/bassist Scott Parker Allen

Scott Parker Allen - Amedeo - Gabriel Anfosso - Christophe Chapelle; François Chassagnite - Francesco Crosara - Groovy Daks - Les Dupont; Josh Fabris - Shirley Bunnie Foy - Thierry Galliano - Marc Guillermont; Jean-Marc Jafet - Nicolas Luchi - Georgia Mancio - Conjunto Massalia; Janysett McPherson - Montparnasse - Linus Olsson - Nina Papa - Ruben Paz; Pino Presti - Isa Rabaraona - Oxai Roura - Samba Um - Santos - Lilian Terry; Timothée and performers Eric Alberti - Giancarmine Arena - Alain Asplanato; Claudio Citarella - Jean Luc Danna - Bruno De Filippi - Sandrine De Stefanis; Fred D'Oelsnitz - Antonio Faraò - Thomas Galliano - Neil Gerstenberg; Marc Peillon - Robert Perci - Fabrice Bistoni - Ronnie Rae - Benny Ross; Yohan Serra - Nicolas Viccaro - Yona Yacoub...

Producer: Pino Presti
Realization: Federico Sacchi for Edizioni Musicali Curci
Co-Producer: Dominique Viccaro
Artwork: Fabrizio Marzagalia
Production assistant: Marie Joëlle Colin
Post-Production: Philippe Frache-D'Arco (Nice)
Mastering: Studio Arion (Nice)
Website by Luca Da Rios
