= The Turning Point (McCoy Tyner album) =

Studio album by McCoy Tyner
- Released: July 1992
- Recorded: November 19–20, 1991
- Studio: Clinton Recording Studio, New York City
- Genre: Jazz
- Length: 55:07
- Label: Birdology
- Producer: Jean-François Deiber

McCoy Tyner chronology
Live in Warsaw (1991)	The Turning Point (1992)	Journey (1993)

Professional ratings
Review scores
Source	Rating
Allmusic	4.5/5 stars

The Turning Point is an album by McCoy Tyner's Big Band released on the Birdology label in 1992. It was recorded in November 1991 and features performances by Tyner's Big Band.

== Reception ==
The Allmusic review by Scott Yanow states that "Tyner's orchestra (seven brass, four reeds and a four-piece rhythm section) is considered one of the major jazz big bands of the 1990s, a perfect outlet for the leader's percussive and modal-oriented piano".

== Track listing ==
All compositions by McCoy Tyner except where noted; all arrangements by composer except where noted.

1. "Passion Dance" (arranged by Dennis Mackrel) – 9:05
2. "Let It Go" (Turre) – 9:14
3. "High Priest" – 5:14
4. "Angel Eyes" (Earl Brent, Matt Dennis; arranged by Slide Hampton) – 5:15
5. "Fly with the Wind" – 11:55
6. "Update" (arranged by Dennis Mackrel) – 8:16
7. "In a Sentimental Mood" (Duke Ellington, Manny Kurtz, Irving Mills; arranged by Tyner) – 6:08

== Personnel ==
- McCoy Tyner – piano, arranger
- Bob Belden – conductor
- Kamau Adilifu – trumpet
- Earl Gardner – trumpet
- Virgil Jones – trumpet
- Frank Lacy – trombone
- Steve Turre – trombone, arranger
- John Clark – French horn
- Howard Johnson – tuba, arranger
- Joe Ford – alto saxophone
- Doug Harris – flute
- Junior Cook – tenor saxophone
- John Stubblefield – tenor saxophone
- Avery Sharpe – double bass, bass guitar
- Aaron Scott – drums
- Jerry González – percussion
- Dennis Mackrel, Slide Hampton – arrangers
