= Yves Robert (musician) =

French jazz player

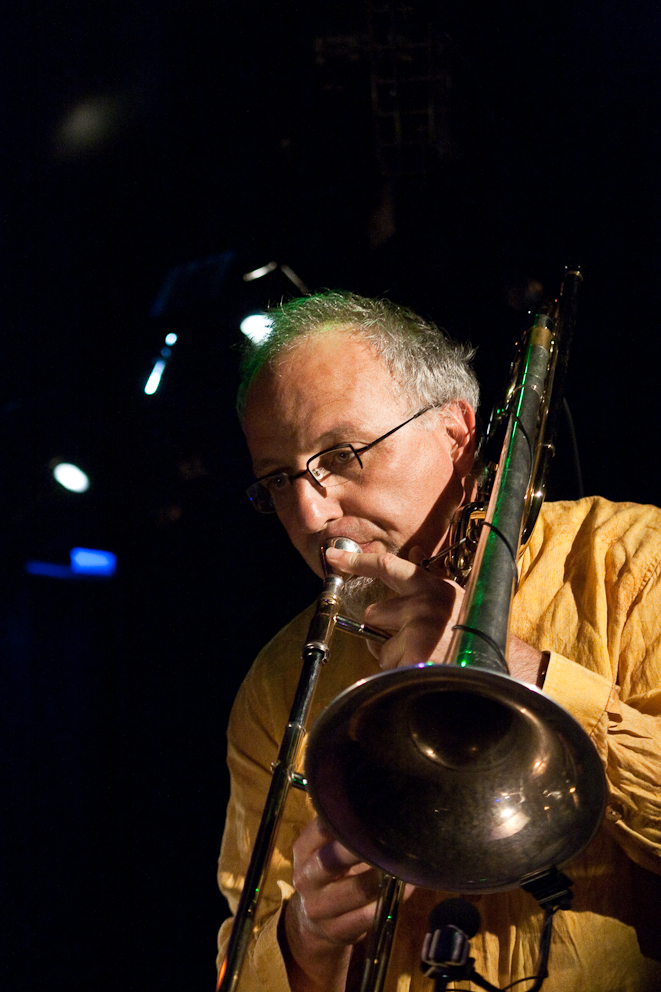
- Robert in 2009

Background information
- Born: 17 January 1958 (age 67); Chamalières, France
- Genres: Jazz, modern jazz
- Instrument: Trombone

Yves Robert (born 17 January 1958) is a French trombone player of modern creative jazz, who has appeared and recorded internationally. He is the trombonist of the Yves Robert Trio founded in 2014.

== Early life ==
Born in Chamalières, Robert studied flute and trombone at the Vichy Conservatory until 1976. He was active in jazz clubs of Lyon and Nancy, and got in touch with the Jazz Avantgarde through the Association à la Recherche d'un Folklore Imaginaire (ARFI) and its Big Band Marmite Infernal.

== Career ==
Robert performed with groups including Chris McGregor's Brotherhood of Breath, Bernard Lubat's La Compagnie Lubat, and in 1986 with the first Orchestre National de Jazz. He worked with the German-French jazz ensemble, playing with Albert Mangelsdorff and Henri Texier, as well as with Gil Evans, Steve Lacy, Didier Levallet and Louis Sclavis. He also performed with André Jaume, Heiner Goebbels, Marc Ducret, Daniel Humair, Wolfgang Reisinger, Andreas Willers, Daniel Erdmann and Joëlle Léandre.

Robert also formed his own groups, first in 1988 a trio with double bassist Bruno Chevillon and drummer Aaron Scott. They performed at European festivals. In 2014, he founded the Yves Robert Trio with Chevillon and drummer Cyril Atef. They played expressive music successfully, using their instruments and electronics, which resulted in a recording released in 2015, entitled Inspired.

== Source ==
- Philippe Carles, André Clergeat, Jean-Louis Comolli: Dictionnaire du jazz, 1994 (ISBN 2-221-07822-5)
- Martin Kunzler: Jazz-Lexikon
