= Lilian Terry =

Italian jazz singer (1930–2023)

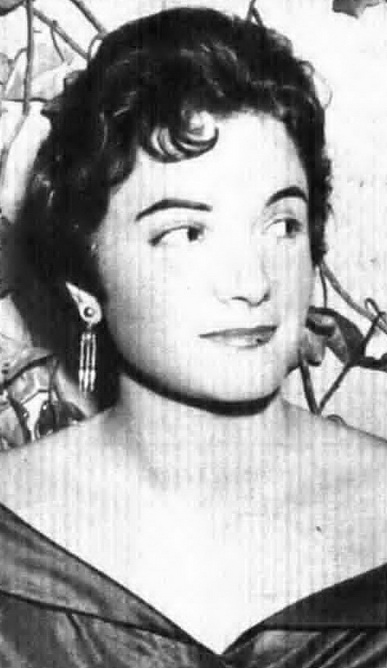
- Terry in Radiocorriere magazine (1957)
- Born: 15 December 1930; Cairo, Egypt
- Died: 29 June 2023 (aged 92); Saint-Laurent-du-Var, France
- Occupation: Singer

Liliane Therese Cachia (15 December 1930 - 29 June 2023), professionally known as Lilian Terry, was an Egyptian-born Italian jazz singer, composer and television and radio presenter.

== Life and career ==
The daughter of an Italian father and Maltese mother, Terry was born in Cairo and at nine years old moved with her family to Rome, where she studied at the Accademia Nazionale di Santa Cecilia, graduating in piano in 1947. She made her official debut in 1952, with a series of performances at the Circolo Jazz in Rome. In 1953 she participated in the radio program Chimere and was the first jazz singer to appear on Italian television, taking part in a program from RAI's experimental phase. She continued to take part in numerous radio and television programs throughout the 1950s, including Totò-Club and Canta Lilian Terry, in which she was accompanied on piano by Romano Mussolini.

In 1962 Terry hosted the musical variety show Abito da sera, where she duetted with numerous internationally renowned jazz musicians. The same year she recorded her biggest recording success, the song "My Heart Belongs to Daddy", which reached the 19th position on the Italian hit parade. In 1965 she founded the "Terry's Mad Pad" jazz club in Rome. In the late 1960s her repertoire started to include Brazilian music, particularly bossa nova compositions. Starting from the 1970s, while continuing to participate in international jazz festivals and hosting television and radio programs, she gradually focused on organizing events and educational projects aimed at raising awareness of jazz music.

In 1983 Terry founded the Dizzy Gillespie Popular School of Music in Bassano del Grappa, which was active until 1996. In 2017 she released her autobiography, Dizzy, Duke, Brother Ray and Friends, published by University of Illinois Press. She died on 29 June 2023.

== Discography ==
Album

- 1958 - Romano Mussolini con Nunzio Rotondo e Lilian Terry (RCA Italiana)
- 1962 - Lilian Terry Presenta Abito Da Sera (CGD)
- 1977 - Col D'Orcia Jazz: Concert For Brunello (with Gianni Basso, Franco Cerri, Tony Scott, Renato Sellani, Julius Farmer, Giancarlo Pillot, C.D.O.)
- 1982 - Lilian Terry Meets Tommy Flanagan - A Dream Comes True (Soul Note)
- 1985 - Oo-Shoo-Be-Doo-Be ...Oo, Oo ...Oo, Oo (with Dizzy Gillespie, Soul Note)
- 2003 - Emotions (with Francesco Crosara, TCB Records)

EP

- 1959 - Lilian Terry (CGD)
- 1963 - Welcome Back To Comblain-La-Tour (CGD)

Compilations

- 2011 - Lilian Terry – CGD Days Collection (Jazz Classics)

Participations

- 2009 - A La Costa Sud (3 songs)
