= Journey (McCoy Tyner album) =

Studio album by McCoy Tyner
- Released: December 1993
- Recorded: May 24–27, 1993
- Studio: Clinton Recording Studio, Skyline Studios, New York City
- Genre: Jazz
- Length: 59:42
- Label: Birdology
- Producer: Jean-François Deiber

McCoy Tyner chronology
The Turning Point (1992)	Journey (1993)	Manhattan Moods (1993)

Journey is an album by McCoy Tyner's Big Band released on the Birdology label in 1993. It was recorded in May 1993 and fcontains performances by Tyner's Big Band, which included the trombonists Steve Turre and Frank Lacy, alto saxophonist Joe Ford, tenor saxophonist Billy Harper, double bass player Avery Sharpe and drummer Aaron Scott. Dianne Reeves sings Sammy Cahn's lyrics on Tyner's classic composition "You Taught My Heart to Sing".

== Reception ==
Professional ratings
Review scores
Source	Rating
Allmusic	4/5 stars

The Allmusic review by Ron Wynn says, "While this isn't among Tyner's greatest recordings, it's still a rigorous, often exciting big-band date."

== Track listing ==
1. "Samba Dei Ber" (Rangelov) - 4:20
2. "Juanita" (Turre) 11:00
3. "Choices" (Mackrel) - 11:17
4. "You Taught My Heart to Sing" (Cahn, Tyner) - 6:17
5. "Peresina" - 11:15
6. "Blues on the Corner" - 9:29
7. "January in Brasil" (Sharpe) - 6:04

All compositions by McCoy Tyner except as indicated
- Recorded in NYC, November 19 & 20, 1991

== Personnel ==
- McCoy Tyner – piano, arranger
- Bob Belden – conductor
- Steve Turre – trombone, arranger
- Frank Lacy – trombone
- Eddie Henderson – trumpet
- Earl Gardner – trumpet
- Virgil Jones – trumpet
- John Clark – French horn
- Tony Underwood – tuba
- Joe Ford – alto saxophone
- Doug Harris – alto saxophone, flute
- Billy Harper – tenor saxophone
- John Stubblefield – tenor saxophone
- Avery Sharpe – double bass
- Aaron Scott – drums
- Jerry Gonzalez – percussion, trumpet
- Slide Hampton – trombone (track 1)
- Ronnie Cuber – baritone saxophone (track 1)
- Valtinho Anastacio – percussion (track 1)
- Dianne Reeves – vocals (track 4)
