= Jean-Marc Jafet =

French bassist and composer (born 1956)

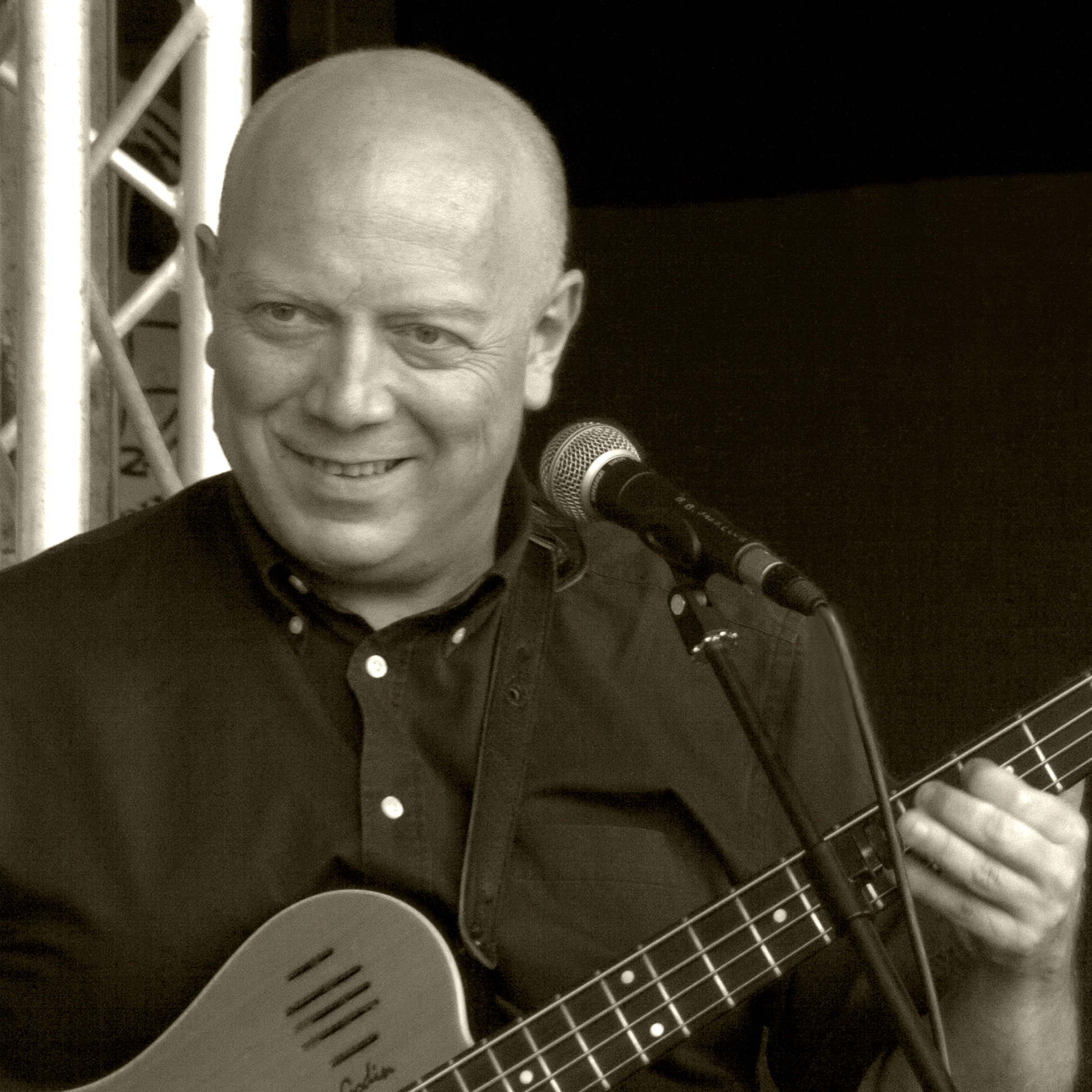
Jean-Marc Jafet 2004

Jean Marc Jafet (born May 8, 1956) is a French bassist and composer. He is considered one of the top bassists in France.

== Biography ==
Jean-Marc Jafet was born on May 8, 1956, in Nice, France, to guitarist father and mother singer. JM Jafet started drumming in the 65/70. He then changed his instrument and became a bassist in 1978 to perform with the Brazilian duo "Les Etoiles". He is one of the most famous, recorded and in-demand electric bass players in France, and known for his work with Sylvain Luc, André Ceccarelli, Didier Lockwood, Biréli Lagrène, Michel Petrucciani and many others.

== Discography ==
=== Leader ===
- 1985: Dolores
- 1994: Agora
- 1996: Live au Parc Floral
- 2000: Douceur Lunaire
- 2004: Mes Anges
- 2007: Live Moments
- 2017: Le Meilleur Moment du Monde

=== With Michel Jonasz ===
- 2005: La Femme Du Parfumeur

=== With Marcia Maria ===
- 1985: Colo De Rio

=== With Richard Galliano ===
- 1999: Spleen

=== With Trio Sud ===
- 2000: Sud
- 2002: Trio Sud
- 2008: Young & Fine

=== Compilations ===
- 2009: A La Costa Sud, Edizioni Musicali Curci
- 2011: Montecarlo - Life Night & Day, h.squared / Halidon
