= Antoine Hervé =

- Born: 20 January 1959 (age 67)
- Genres: Jazz
- Occupation: Musician
- Instrument: Piano
- Website: antoineherve.com

Antoine Hervé (born 20 January 1959 in Paris) is a French composer and pianist.

Hervé studied composition at the Conservatoire national supérieur de musique. Between 1987 and 1989 he was director of the French National Jazz Orchestra.

Next to musicals, soundtracks for movies and dance shows Hervé has composed a concert for trumpet and a piece for drums and orkest. During 1997 Hervé and Markus Stockhausen founded a quintet.

== Works ==
- Tutti
- Soundtrack for Un Monde Sans Pitié by Eric Rochant
- Mr. Astaire, Musical
- L'Opéra des Pékins
- A Chacun Son Serpent
- Sonate d'Automne
- Mes Bien Chers Frères
- Tribute to Miles Davis
- La Maison Brûlée
- Transit, 1994
- Transactions
- Mozart, La Nuit, Musical, 1997
- Les Caprices De Morgane, Musical, 1997
- Macadam-Macadam, Hip-Hop-Ballett, 2000/01
- A Chacun Son Serpent, Musical, 2000/01
- Absolute Dream

== Discography ==
- Antoine Hervé Trio, 1985 with Michel Benita and Peter Gritz
- ONJ 87, 1987
- African Dream, 1987
- Paris-Zagreb, 1990
- Hexameron, 1990 with Vinko Globokar, Louis Sclavis, György Kurtág, Andy Emler.
- Invention Is You, 1997
- Summertime, 2001
- Mozart, La Nuit, 2002
- Inside, 2003
- I Mean You (Tribute to Thelonious Monk), 2010
