= François Jeanneau =

French jazz saxophonist, flautist and composer (born 1935)

- Born: 15 June 1935 (age 91); Paris, France
- Genre: Jazz
- Occupations: Musician; composer
- Instruments: Saxophone; flute
- Years active: 1960–2010s
- Formerly of: Jef Gilson; François Tusques; Triangle; Orchestre National de Jazz; Brotherhood of Breath
- Education: Conservatoire de Paris

François Jeanneau (born 15 June 1935 in Paris) is a French jazz saxophonist, flautist and composer.

Jeanneau studied flute at the Conservatoire de Paris under René Le Roy, but is self-taught on saxophone. He began playing professionally in 1960 at the Club Saint-Germain in Paris, then worked in the big band of Jef Gilson and in a sextet with François Tusques. In the late 1960s and early 1970s, he was a member of the band Triangle. He won the Prix Django Reinhardt in 1980 and was the first leader of the Orchestre National de Jazz in 1986.

== Discography ==
- Triangle (Pathé, 1970)
- The Paris Quartet, (Horo, 1975) – with Michel Graillier, Jean-François Jenny-Clark and Aldo Romano
- Un Bien Curieuse Planète (1975)
- Techniques Douces (Owl, 1976)
- Ephémère (Owl, 1977)
- Akagera (Disques JMS, 1980) – with Daniel Humair and Henri Texier
- Double Messieurs (Open, 1980) – Le Quatuor des saxophones
- Soli Solo Plus (1981)
- Mad Sax (Cy, 1982) – Le Quatuor des saxophones
- Terraines Vagues (Pandémonium, 1983)
- Prao (Cy, 1983)
- Orchestre National de Jazz (Label Bleu, 1986) – with the Orchestre National de Jazz, as director
- Jazz Bühne Berlin (1986) – with the Orchestre National de Jazz
- Pandémonium (Carlyne Music, 1988)
- Taxiway (1989)
- Mixtures: Music for Media (1989)
- Up Date 3.3 (Label Bleu, 1990) – with Daniel Humair and Henri Texier
- Recontre (1991)
- Tribute to Mingus (Adda, 1992) – with Enrico Rava, Hervé Sellin, François Mechali and André Ceccarelli
- Maloya Transit, le Quartet + le Trio Tambour (1992)
- A Love Affair in Cermont-Ferrand (1993)
- Chaude Image (1995)
- Le POM (1997)
- Alice (1997)
- Estremadure (1999) – Le POM
- Connection (1999)
- FrameWork (2000)
- Charméditerranéen (2001–02) – with the Orchestre National de Jazz
- Eleven (2002)
- Paf Paf (2003) – with Victor Komenkov
- Médéo (2003) – with the Youth Almaty Jazz Band
- Recontre avec Sulé (2003)
- Trans-Kasakh-Express (2004)
- Flench Wok (2004)
- Quand se Taisant les Oiseaux (2006–07)
- Art of the Duo: Walking in the Wind (Tutu, 2008) – with Uli Lenz
- Tarot du Kebar (Gwen Català Éditeur, 2016) – with Emmanuel Tugny
